= Monsieur Beaucaire =

Monsieur Beaucaire can refer to:

- Monsieur Beaucaire (novel), a 1900 work by Booth Tarkington
- Monsieur Beaucaire (operetta) based on the novel
- Monsieur Beaucaire (1924 film) based on the novel starring Rudolph Valentino
- Monsieur Beaucaire (1946 film) based on the novel featuring Bob Hope
