= Lawful Larceny =

Lawful Larceny may refer to:

- Lawful Larceny (1930 film), an American pre-Code melodramatic film, based on the play
- Lawful Larceny (1923 film), an American silent drama film, based on the play
- Lawful Larceny (play), a 1922 play by Samuel Shipman
