= Lowell Sherman =

American actor and film director (1888–1934)

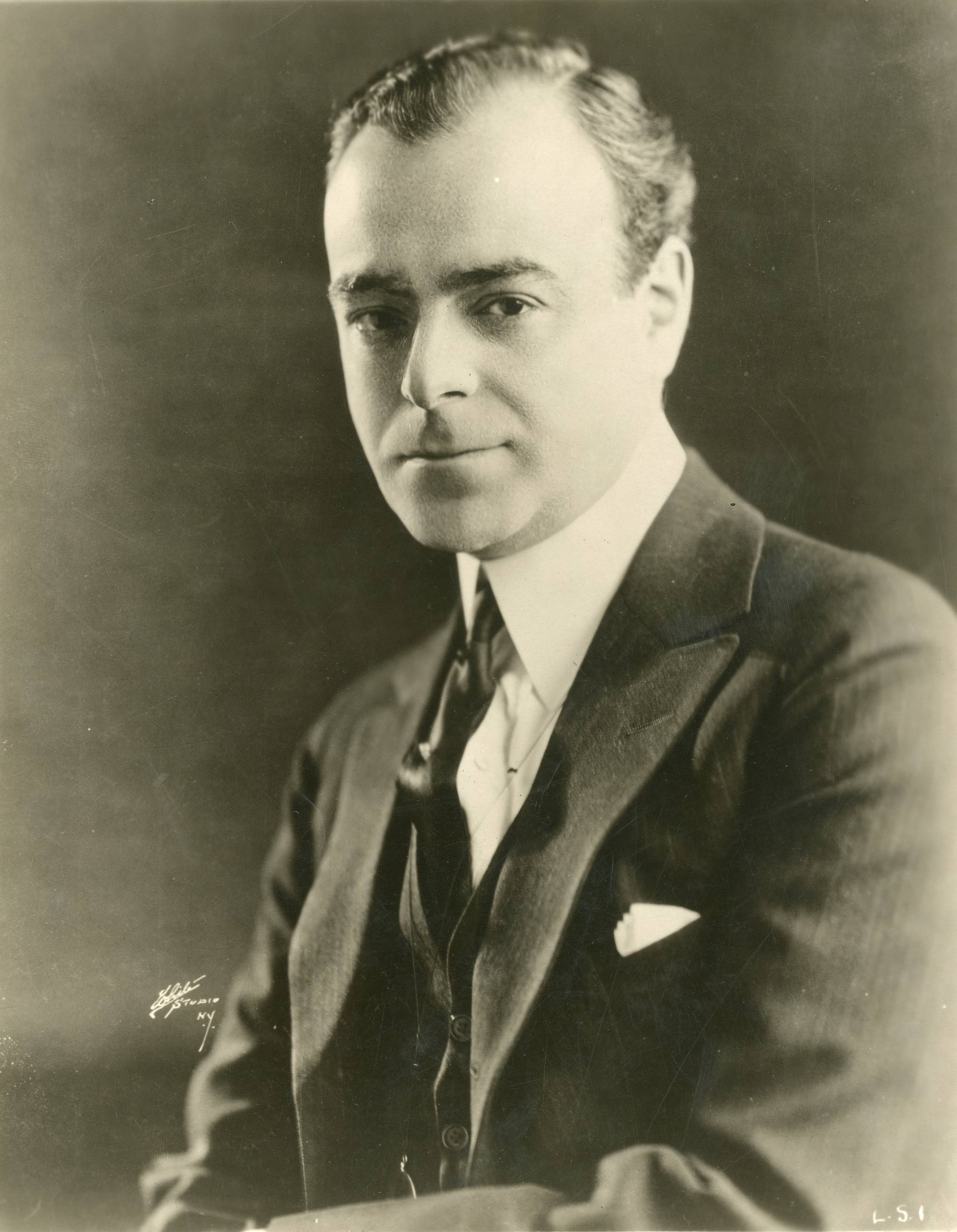
- Sherman in 1928
- Born: October 11, 1888; San Francisco, California, US
- Died: December 28, 1934 (aged 46); Los Angeles, California, US
- Resting place: Forest Lawn Memorial Park
- Occupations: Actor; film director
- Years active: 1904–1934
- Spouses: Evelyn Booth (m. 1914; div. 1922) Pauline Garon (m. 1926; div. 1929) Helene Costello (m. 1930; div. 1932)

Lowell Sherman (October 11, 1888 – December 28, 1934) was an American actor and film director. In an unusual practice for the time, he served as both actor and director on several films in the early 1930s. He later turned exclusively to directing. Having scored huge successes directing the films She Done Him Wrong (starring Mae West) and Morning Glory (which won Katharine Hepburn her first Academy Award), he was at the height of his career when he died after a brief illness.

== Early life and career ==
Born in San Francisco in 1888 to John Sherman and Julia Louise Gray, who were both connected with the theater; John as a theatrical management agent and Julia as a stage actress. His maternal grandmother had been an actress, starring with the actor Edwin Booth (brother of actor-assassin John Wilkes Booth). Sherman began his career as a child actor appearing in many touring companies.

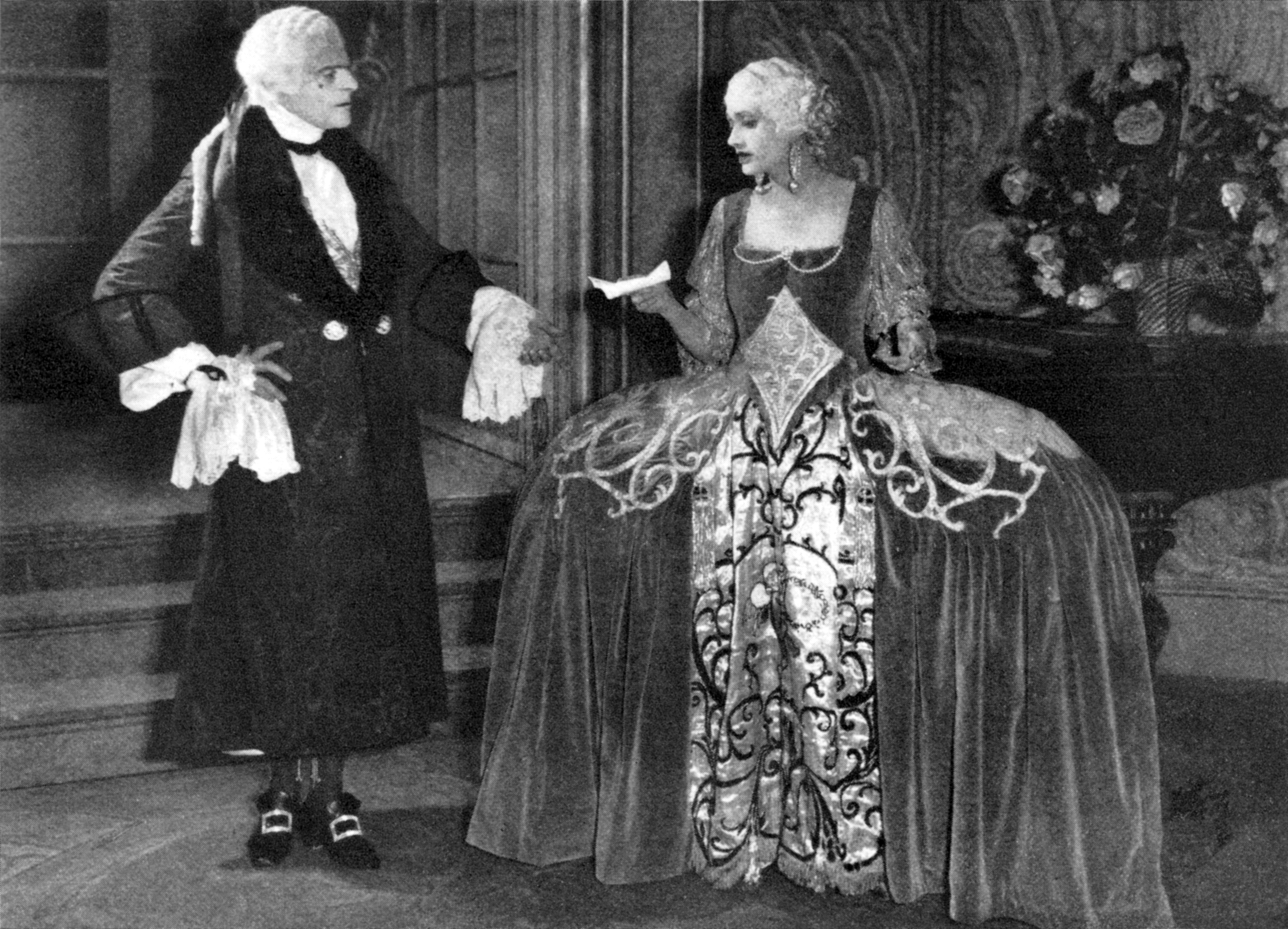
Sherman and Katharine Cornell in the Broadway production of Casanova (1923)

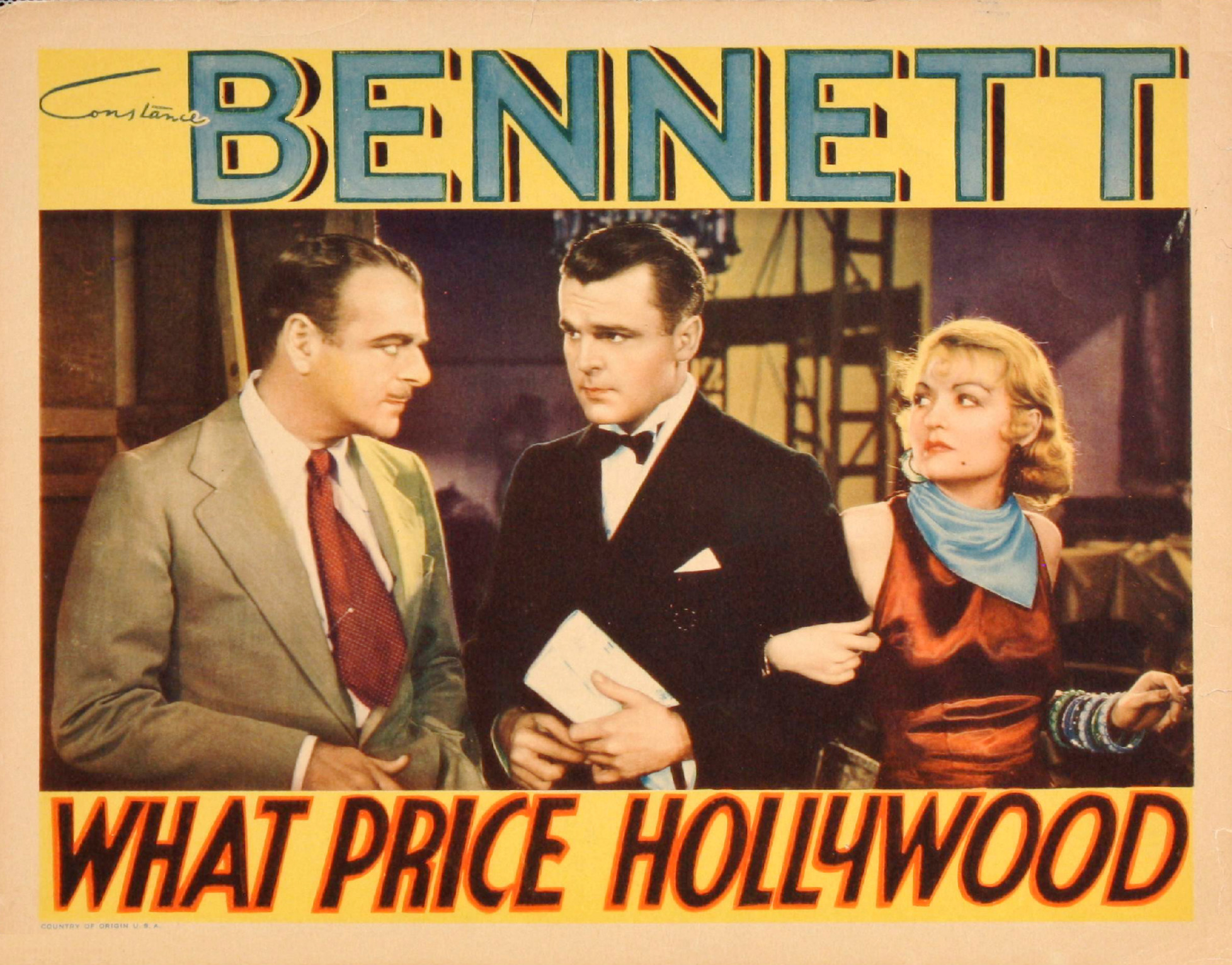
Sherman (left), Neil Hamilton and Constance Bennett in What Price Hollywood? (1932)

As an adolescent he appeared on Broadway in plays such as Judith of Bethulia (1904) with Nance O'Neil and in David Belasco's 1905 smash hit The Girl of the Golden West with Blanche Bates where he was a young Pony Express rider.

By 1915, Sherman was appearing in silent films usually playing playboys, until D. W. Griffith cast him as the villain in the film, Way Down East (1920). He continued playing villains or playboys in films, as he had in the theatre, throughout the 1920s, in such films as Molly O' (1921), A Lady of Chance (1929) and later in talkies such as Ladies of Leisure (1930), and What Price Hollywood? (1932).

In 1921, Sherman was in San Francisco attending a party as a guest of friend Roscoe Arbuckle at the St. Francis Hotel. He was in an adjoining room with madam Maude Delmont when Arbuckle was with Virginia Rappe. Rappe died four days afterwards. Lurid allegations circulated that Arbuckle had raped her at the party and inflicted injuries which directly caused her death. Arbuckle was arrested for murder (later downgraded to manslaughter), and Sherman had to testify during the ensuing trial.

Sherman's career did not significantly suffer from the fallout of his attendance at the party. On Broadway in 1923, Sherman played the aptly suited Casanova in a play of that name; his leading lady was Katharine Cornell. His sole Broadway directing credit was in 1923's Morphia, in which he also starred. His suave reputation was built after many years appearing in Broadway farces. Even after he became a successful silent film star, he continued to perform on Broadway, his last role being in The Woman Disputed, which ran from September 1926 through March 1927.

Though successful, Sherman was not entirely happy with his career as an actor, stating "Nothing becomes so monotonous as acting on the stage, especially if you are successful ... working in the movies seemed even duller." In 1930, RKO executive William LeBaron gave him the opportunity he was looking for; allowing him to star in and direct the film, Lawful Larceny. Sherman had starred in the Broadway production of the play the film was based on, and reprised his role. Over the next three years, he starred and directed himself in seven more films, including Bachelor Apartment (1931) with Irene Dunne, The Royal Bed (1931) with Mary Astor, and The Greeks Had a Word for Them (1932) with Joan Blondell.

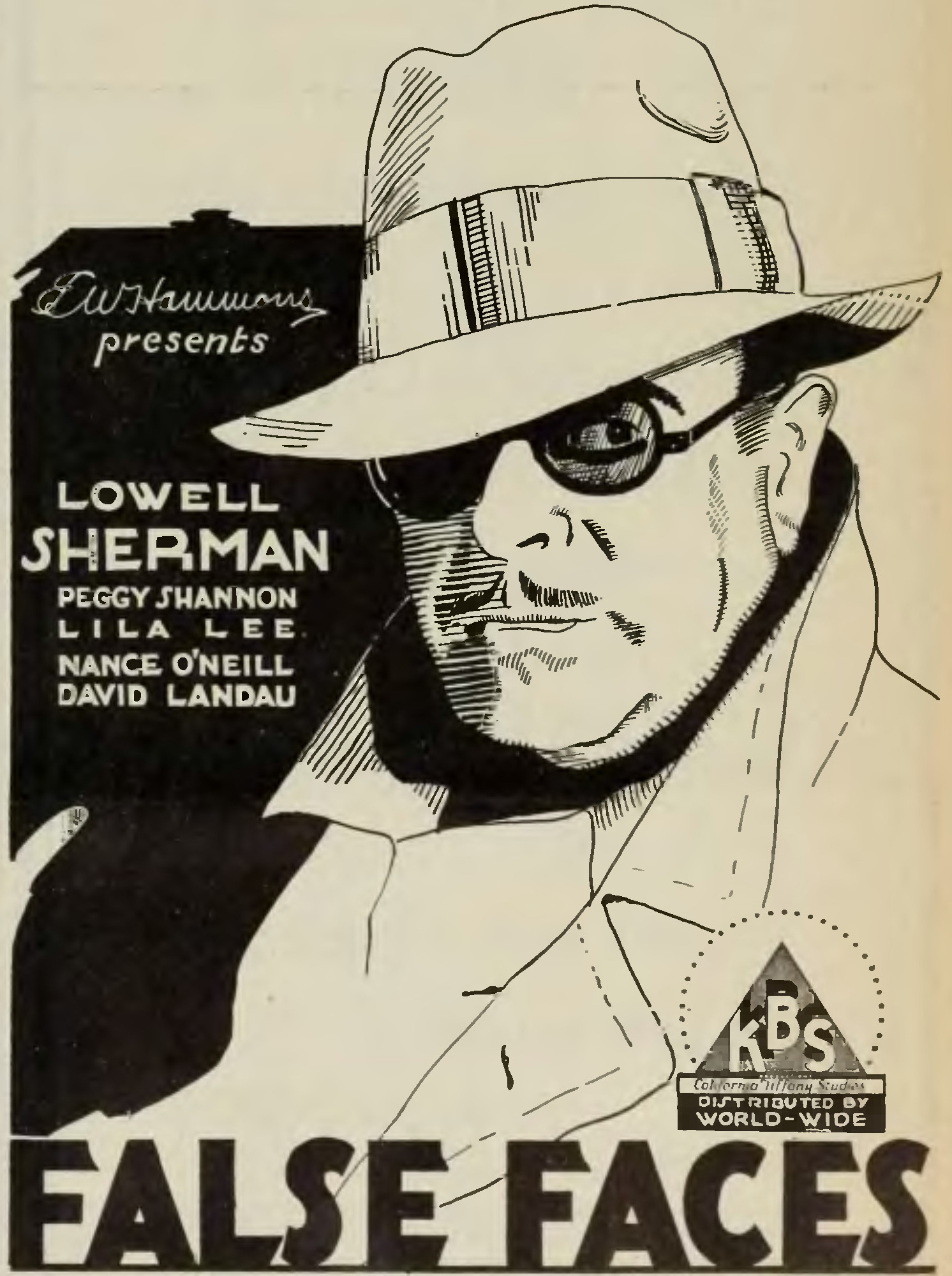
False Faces ad from The Film Daily, 1932

In 1933, he focused on his directing duties. 1932's The Greeks Had a Word for Them was his last acting role, either on stage or screen. The five films where his sole responsibility was directing were all critical and financial successes. He directed Mae West in her first starring film She Done Him Wrong (Paramount Pictures, 1933), and followed that with Katharine Hepburn's Oscar-winning performance in Morning Glory (RKO Radio Pictures, 1933). He also directed Broadway Through a Keyhole (Twentieth Century Pictures, 1933) with Russ Columbo, and Born to Be Bad (United Artists, 1934) with Loretta Young and Cary Grant (who he had worked with on She Done Him Wrong). His final work, Night Life of the Gods (Universal Pictures), was released in 1935, after Sherman's death, and was another critical and financial success.

== Personal life ==
Sherman was married three times and had no children. His first marriage was to actress Evelyn Booth, sister of playwright John Hunter Booth, whom he married on March 11, 1914. Booth filed for divorce claiming that Sherman neglected to provide for her and was cruel. She was granted a divorce on March 19, 1922. In 1926, he married actress Pauline Garon. Sherman filed for divorce on January 25, 1929, claiming that Garon had deserted him in August 1928 at the insistence of her parents. The divorce was granted in March 1929. His third and final marriage was with actress Helene Costello, the younger sister of Dolores Costello. They married on March 15, 1930, in Beverly Hills. This made Sherman a brother-in-law of longtime friend John Barrymore and both appeared in Barrymore's early talkie General Crack. The two however fell out after a comment Sherman made to Barrymore, about Shakespeare portrayals, in the garden of Barrymore's Tower Road home. Sherman and Helene separated in November 1931 and were divorced in May 1932.

== Death ==
On December 28, 1934, Sherman died at a Los Angeles hospital of double pneumonia. He is interred at Forest Lawn Memorial Park, Glendale.

At the time of his death, Sherman was directing Becky Sharp, the first film to be shot entirely in the three-strip Technicolor format. Even after he became ill, Sherman continued to work on the project, and was 25 days into production. Upon his death, Rouben Mamoulian was brought in to finish the film. Mamoulian did not use any of the footage shot by Sherman, choosing instead to reshoot the entire film.

Louella Parsons broke the news of Sherman's death on her Hollywood Hotel radio broadcast, treating it as a scoop. Listeners immediately called in to protest her unsympathetic handling of the news. She was temporarily suspended by the J. Wallis Armstrong Agency, which represented the sponsor of the show, the Campbell Soup Company.

== Broadway career ==
- Judith of Bethulia (1904)
- The System of Dr. Tarr (1905)
- Strolling Players (1905)
- The Girl of the Golden West (1906) - Rider of the Pony Express
- The Girl of the Golden West (1907) - Rider of the Pony Express
- The Girl of the Golden West (1908) - Rider of the Pony Express
- The First Lady in the Land (1911–12) - James Madison
- The Dragon's Claw (1914)
- The Eternal Magdalene (1915–16)
- The Heart of Wetona (1916) - Anthony Wells
- The Guilty Man (1916)
- Our Little Wife (1916)
- The Knife (1917)
- Good Morning, Rosamond (1917)
- The Heritage (1918)
- The Squab Farm (1918)
- A Marriage of Convenience (1918)
- Not with My Money (1918)
- The Woman in Room 13 (1919)
- The Sign on the Door (1919–20) - Frank Devereaux
- The Man's Name (1920) - Hal Marvin
- Lawful Larceny (1922) - Guy Tarlow
- The Fool (1922–23) - Jerry Goodkind
- The Masked Woman (1922–23) - Baron Tolento
- Morphia (1923) - Julian Wade
- Casanova (1923) - Giacomo Casanova
- Leah Kleschna (1924) - Raoul Berton
- High Stakes (1924) - Joe Lennon
- The Woman Disputed (1926–27) - Capt. Friedrich Von Hartmann

== Filmography ==
- Lost films labeled in **Bold** text

Year	Film	Role	Director	Notes
1914	Behind the Scenes	Teddy Harrington	James Kirkwood	
1914	Always in the Way			
1915	Sold	Johnson	Hugh Ford	**Lost** film
1915	The Better Woman	Frank Barclay	Joseph A. Golden	**Lost** film
1917	Vera, the Medium	Robert Sterling	G. M. Anderson	**Lost** film
1920	Yes or No ?	Paul Derreck	Roy William Neill	
1920	Way Down East	Lennox Sanderson	D. W. Griffith	
1920	The New York Idea	John Karslake	Herbert Blache; Marcel Del Sano (asst. director)	
1921	The Gilded Lily	Creighton Howard	Robert Z. Leonard	
1921	What No Man Knows	Craig Dunlap	Harry Garson	**Incomplete** film
1921	Molly O	Fred Manchester	Ray Grey (assistant director)	
1922	Grand Larceny	Barry Clive	Wallace Worsley	
1922	The Face in the Fog	Count Alexis Orloff	Alan Crosland	
1923	Bright Lights of Broadway	Randall Sherrill	Webster Campbell	
1924	The Masked Dancer	Prince Madhe Azhar	Ben Silvey(ass't director)	**Lost** film
1924	The Spitfire	Horace Fleming	Christy Cabanne	**Lost** film
1924	The Truth About Women	Warren Carr	Burton L. King	**Lost** film
1924	Monsieur Beaucaire	King Louis XV of France	Sidney Olcott	
1925	Satan in Sables	Michael Lyev Yervedoff	Gordon Hollingshead (ass't director)	
1926	The Reckless Lady	Feodor	Howard Higgin	**Lost** film
1926	The Love Toy	Peter Remsen	Erle C. Kenton	**Lost** film
1926	The Wilderness Woman	Alan Burkett	Howard Higgin	**Lost** film
1926	You Never Know Women	Eugene Foster	William Wellman	
1926	Lost at Sea	Norman Travers	Louis J. Gasnier	**Lost** film
1927	Convoy	Ernest Drake	Lothar Mendes (uncredited)	**Lost** film
1927	The Girl from Gay Paree	Robert Ryan	Arthur Gregor	
1928	The Divine Woman	Henry Legrand	Victor Sjöström	**Lost** film
1928	The Garden of Eden	Henri D'Avril	Lewis Milestone	
1928	The Whip Woman	Baron	Joseph C. Boyle	**Lost** film
1928	Mad Hour	Joe Mack	Joseph Boyle	**Lost** film
1928	The Heart of a Follies Girl	Rogers Winthrop	John Francis Dillon	**Lost** film
1928	The Scarlet Dove	Ivan Orloff	Arthur Gregor	
1928	The Whip	Greville Sartoris	Charles Brabin	
1928	Phipps			
1928	A Lady of Chance	Bradley / "Brad"	Robert Z. Leonard	
1929	Evidence	Norman Pollock	John G. Adolfi	**Lost** film
1930	General Crack	Leopold II	Alan Crosland	
1930	Mammy	Billy West / Westy	Michael Curtiz	
1930	Ladies of Leisure	Bill Standish	Frank Capra	
1930	He Knew Women	Geoffrey Clarke	Hugh Herbert	
1930	Midnight Mystery	Tom Austen	George B. Seitz	
1930	Oh, Sailor Behave		Archie Mayo	
1930	Lawful Larceny	Guy Tarlow	Lowell Sherman	
1930	The Pay-Off	Gene Fenmore	Lowell Sherman	
1931	The Royal Bed	King Eric VIII	Lowell Sherman	
1931	The Stolen Jools			Short
1931	Bachelor Apartment	Wayne Carter	Lowell Sherman	
1931	High Stakes	Joe Lennon	Lowell Sherman	
1932	The Greeks Had a Word for Them	Boris Feldman	Lowell Sherman	
1932	What Price Hollywood?	Maximilian 'Max' Carey	George Cukor	
1932	Ladies of the Jury		Lowell Sherman	
1932	False Faces	Dr. Silas Brenton	Lowell Sherman	
1933	She Done Him Wrong		Lowell Sherman	Direction only
1933	Morning Glory		Lowell Sherman	Direction only
1933	Broadway Through a Keyhole		Lowell Sherman	Direction only
1934	Born to Be Bad		Lowell Sherman	Direction only
1935	Night Life of the Gods		Lowell Sherman	Direction only
