= Monsieur Beaucaire (opera) =

Opera by André Messager

Monsieur Beaucaire: Act II sword fight

Monsieur Beaucaire is a romantic opera in three acts, composed by André Messager. The libretto, based on the 1900 novel by Booth Tarkington, is by Frederick Lonsdale, with lyrics by Adrian Ross. The piece premiered at the Prince of Wales Theatre in Birmingham, England, on 7 April 1919, before opening at the Prince's Theatre in London under the management of Frank Curzon on 19 April 1919 and transferring to the Palace Theatre on 29 July 1919, for a successful run.

Monsieur Beaucaire was also produced on Broadway in 1919–1920 and enjoyed many revivals and international tours. The French premiere was delayed by difficulties in finding a suitable theatre; it opened at the Théâtre Marigny, Paris on 21 November 1925, with a French adaptation by André Rivoire and Pierre Veber, and starring Marcelle Denya, Renée Camia, and André Baugé. In 1955, it entered the repertoire of the Opéra-Comique in Paris, with Jacques Jansen and Denise Duval.

The composer stated that he began work on Monsieur Beaucaire following a meeting with impresario Gilbert Miller in 1916. Messager's son said that most of it was composed during the summer of 1917 in Étretat. Messager's career in London, which included a six-year stint as music director at Covent Garden, concluded with Monsieur Beaucaire, his second and last opera in English. As well as considerable use of the waltz-time, there are several neo-classical touches in the score. Some of the most popular songs are "I do not know", "Red Rose", and "Philomel".

== Roles and original cast ==
Marion Green and Maggie Teyte

- Monsieur Beaucaire – Marion Green
- Philippe Molyneux – John Clarke
- Frederick Bantison – Lennox Pawle
- Rakell – Spencer Trevor
- François – Yvan Servais
- Duke of Winterset – Robert Parker
- Beau Nash – Robert Cunningham
- Townbrake – Dennis King
- Captain Badger – Percy Carr
- Joliffe – Harry Frankiss
- Bicksitt – Leigh Ellis
- The Marquis de Mirepox – Yvan Servais
- Lucy – Alice Moffat
- Countess of Greenbury – Violet Jerome
- Girl – Renée Morrell
- Lady Mary Carlisle – Maggie Teyte

== Synopsis ==
Act I

The setting is Bath in the early 18th century. Beaucaire is posing as a barber employed by the French Ambassador. He is actually the Duc d'Orleans, the son of the King of France, a fact only known to his valet and his friend, Molyneux. Beaucaire is in love with Lady Mary Carlisle, who is herself courted by the Duke of Winterset. Beaucaire hosts a card game, where a number of gentlemen lose most of their money to him. In the second round, Beaucaire plays Winterset for high stakes. At the climax of the hand, Beaucaire exposes Winterset as a cheat. Winterset threatens to kill his opponent, but Beaucaire reveals that they are observed by his servants and the noble Molyneux. As the price of Beaucaire's silence, Winterset takes him to Lady Rellerton's ball to introduce him to Lady Mary.

Beaucaire and Mary

Molyneux is in love with Lady Mary's cousin Lucy and courts her at the ball. Beaucaire charms the company, and Lady Mary asks to be left alone with him. He begs the rose in her hair. She says that he must earn it by escorting the aged Countess of Greenbury to supper. To obtain revenge, Winterset persuades Captain Badger, a famous swordsman, to quarrel with Beaucaire, who challenges him to a duel. They fight on the terrace and, to everyone's surprise, Beaucaire is the victor. He takes the old Countess into supper and receives his rose from Lady Mary.

Act II

At a "Pastoral Fete" at Mr. Bantison's house outside Bath, Lady Mary is still smitten with Beaucaire, although she has many suitors. Lucy finally gets Molyneux alone, to get him to promise to be hers alone for the evening, when he is summoned away by Beaucaire. Lucy accuses him of going to another woman but he denies it in a romantic song. But the summons is a trick of Winterset. Once Molyneux has gone, he denounces Beaucaire as the barber. One by one all of the suitors attack Beaucaire, and are all wounded. An assault by the massed servants of his opponents threatens to defeat Beaucaire, when Francois and his fellow servants join in the battle and repulse the attackers. Lady Mary, believing herself deceived, storms off. Beaucaire is seriously wounded.

Act III

A week later, it has been announced that the French Ambassador will attend the pump room that evening, and guards have been placed to prevent Beaucaire from attending. His previously defeated opponents sing of how they bear "The Honours of War". Molyneux is still having trouble with Lucy but manages to convince her to arrange a secret meeting between Mary and Beaucaire. Beaucaire explains the situation to her, and asks if the identity of a lover truly matters? Lady Mary agrees. Winterset and his followers enter, followed by the Ambassador. Everyone is amazed when the Ambassador enters and kneels to the presumed barber, hailing him "A Son of France". The King of France is dead, and, out of danger, Beaucaire reveals himself as the Duke of Orleans and announces that Mary will be his future Duchess, to everyone's delight.

== Musical numbers ==
Prologue

- "Voyageur's Song" – Chorus
- "Red Rose" – Monsieur Beaucaire
- "Going to the Ball" – Philip Molyneux, Beaucaire, and Duke of Winterset

Act I

- "The Beaux and the Belles of Bath" – Opening Chorus
- "A Little More" – Lucy and Molyneux
- "Come with Welcome" – Chorus
- "I do not know" – Lady Mary Carlisle
- "Who is this?" – Chorus
- "English Maids" – Beaucaire
- "Lightly, Lightly" – Lady Mary and Beaucaire
- "No Offence" – Molyneux, Beaucaire, Captain Badger, and Winterset
- Act I Finale – Company

Act II

- "Pastoral Fete" – Chorus
- "When I was King of Bath" – Beau Nash
- "That's a Woman's Way" – Lucy
- "Philomel" – Lady Mary
- "Honour and Love" – Molyneux
- "Say No More" – Lady Mary and Beaucaire
- Act II Finale – Company

Act III

- "Have you heard?" – Opening Chorus
- "The Honours of War" – Rakell, Townbrake, Joliffe, Badger, Frederick Bantison, and Bicksitt
- "We are not speaking now" – Lucy and Molyneux
- "Under the Moon" – Beaucaire
- "What are Names?" – Lady Mary and Beaucaire
- "Way for the Ambassador" – Chorus
- "A Son of France" – Marquis de Mirepoix
- Act III Finale – Company

Supplemental

- "Gold and Blue and White" – Beaucaire

== Critical reception ==
Reviewing the premiere, The Times concluded, "If Monsieur Beaucaire avoids being an opera it enlists some of the best talents of the Opera. Miss Maggie Teyte, surrounded by half a dozen lovers on the stage, may be sure of as many hundreds in the auditorium, and Mr. Marion Green, every inch the Noble Personage, has a voice to match. Miss Alice Moffat and Mr. John Clarke together make the subsidiary lovers attractive, and Mr. Robert Parker is the very image of courtly vice. It Is rare to get so much good singing where good acting must have been the first requirement in making up the cast. There is a chorus which adds to its beautiful dresses the power of producing quite a beautiful sound, and an orchestra which, under Mr. Kennedy Russell, lets us enjoy the best that Mr. Messager can give." In The Observer, Ernest Newman, having made some mild criticisms of the score and some harsher ones of the libretto, concluded that the piece was "a delightful entertainment, that one can picture oneself going to see a number of times." In The Manchester Guardian, Samuel Langford praised the work, with reservations about the clichéd libretto, but regretted that there was not more music.

== Recording history ==
A series of 78 rpm records were made by British Columbia in London in 1919 at the time of the creation, with Marion Green, Maggie Teyte, Alice Moffat, and John Clarke, with the Prince's Theatre Orchestra conducted by Kennedy Russell.

Various excerpts were recorded in Paris in 1925 and 1930 by French singers after staged performances. Extended extracts were recorded in Paris in 1952, with Martha Angelici, Liliane Berton, Michel Dens, René Lenoty, and Gilbert Moryn, conducted by Jules Gressier.

On 27 March 1958, French Radio broadcast a complete performance (since issued on CD) with Lina Dachary, Willy Clément, Nicole Broissin, René Lenoty, Lucien Lovano, Henri Bedex, Jacques Pruvost, Georges Foix, Marcel Enot, and André Balbon, with the Choeurs and Orchestre Radio Lyrique de la RTF, conducted again by Jules Gressier.

== Other adaptations of the Tarkington novel ==
A "romantic comedy" was made from the novel by Evelyn Greenleaf Sutherland. It played first on Broadway from December 1901 to January 1902, directed by and starring Richard Mansfield. It opened in London on 25 October 1902 at the Comedy Theatre, produced by William Greet and Lewis Waller under the management of Frank Curzon and directed by Guy Waller. The cast included Waller as Monsieur Beaucaire and Grace Lane as Lady Mary Carlisle.

In addition, there was a silent film, Monsieur Beaucaire, with Rudolph Valentino in 1924, and a 1946 comedy film that featured Bob Hope. An episode from the novel was incorporated into the screenplay of the 1930 film Monte Carlo.
