= Wedding Bells (play) =

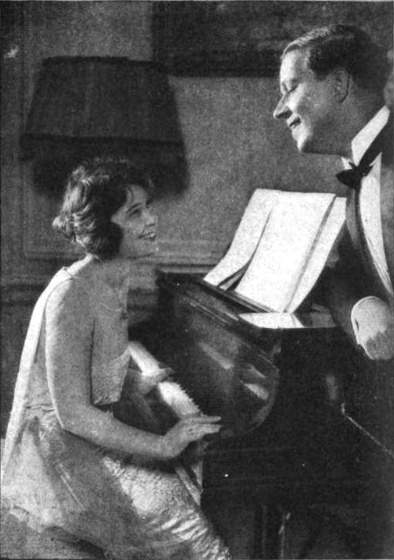
- Margaret Lawrence and Wallace Eddinger in Wedding Bells
- Original language: English
- Written by: Salisbury Field
- Subject: Divorce
- Genre: Comedy

Premiere
- Date: Broadway 1919
- Place: Harris Theatre

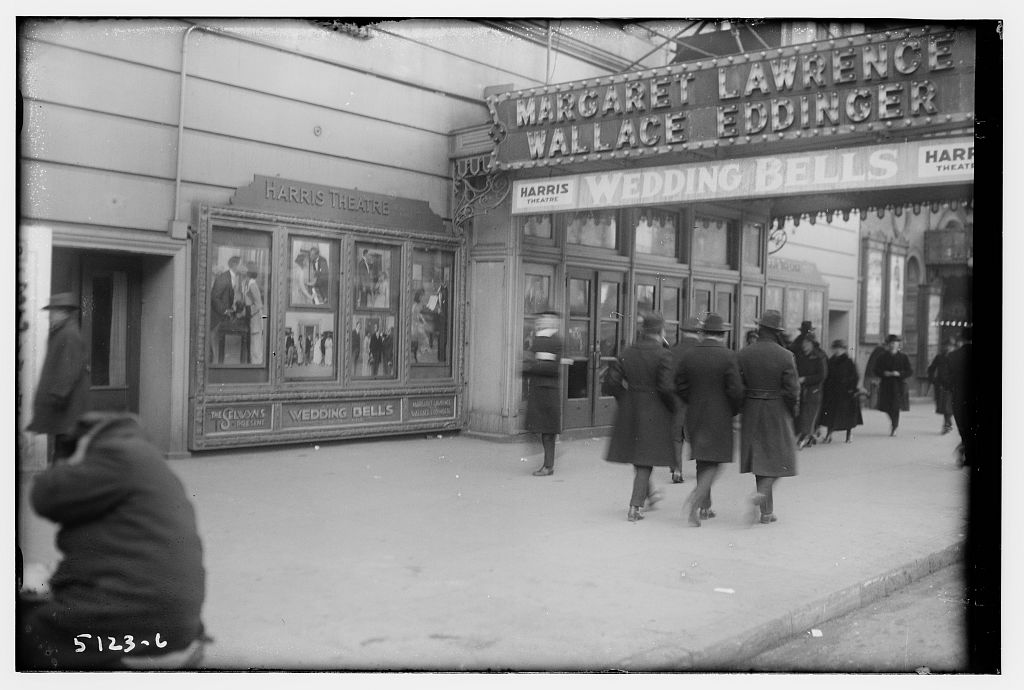
Harris Theatre marquee during play's run

Wedding Bells is a 1919 comedic play which played on Broadway.

The play was written by Salisbury Field and staged by Edgar Selwyn, and opened on Broadway on November 12, 1919 at the Harris Theatre. It played through April 1, 1920, for a total of 168 performances. Prior to opening in New York, initial performances occurred in Washington, D.C.

Wallace Eddinger and Margaret Lawrence played the lead roles.

The play received generally positive reviews, and Burns Mantle included the play on his list of best plays of the season.

It was adapted into a silent film released in 1921 featuring Constance Talmadge.

It also was staged in London, and subsequent to a touring production after closing on Broadway, other productions of the play in the United States were mounted into the 1930s. Aside from appearing in editions of Burns Mantle's best play lists, the play has subsequently received little attention.

== Original Broadway Cast ==
- Percy Ames as Spencer Wells
- Maud Andrew as Hooper
- George Burton as Fuzisaki
- Wallace Eddinger as Reginald Carter
- Jessie F. Glendinning as Marcia Hunter
- John Harwood as Jackson
- Margaret Lawrence as Rosalie
- Mrs. Jacques Martin as Mrs. Hunter
