= Ambrose Applejohn's Adventure =

Play by Walter Hackett

- Original language: English
- Written by: Walter Hackett
- Genre: Comedy

Premiere
- Date: 19 July 1921
- Place: Criterion Theatre

Ambrose Applejohn's Adventure is a 1921 play written by Walter Hackett. It was a hit on the West End, where it ran for 18 months, and also on Broadway, where it was performed under the title Captain Applejack. It has been adapted multiple times as a movie and also as a stage musical.

== Plot ==
Ambrose Applejohn is bored with his life in Cornwall, where he lives with his ward, Poppy Faire. He decides to sell his country estate so he can find excitement elsewhere. Several strangers appear at his door, all claiming reasons to be there that have nothing to do with the sale. One woman says she is a Russian dancer trying to defect, and a man claims to be looking for her. A couple says their car has broken down. Applejohn assumes they are all really prospective buyers investigating his home.

That night Applejohn dreams he is a pirate, Captain Applejack. His visitors appear in the dream as his adversaries. The next day, he discovers that the visitors are thieves hunting for a treasure map hidden in the house. Applejohn and Faire overcome the criminals, and he decides that life in Cornwall is exciting enough after all.

== Productions ==
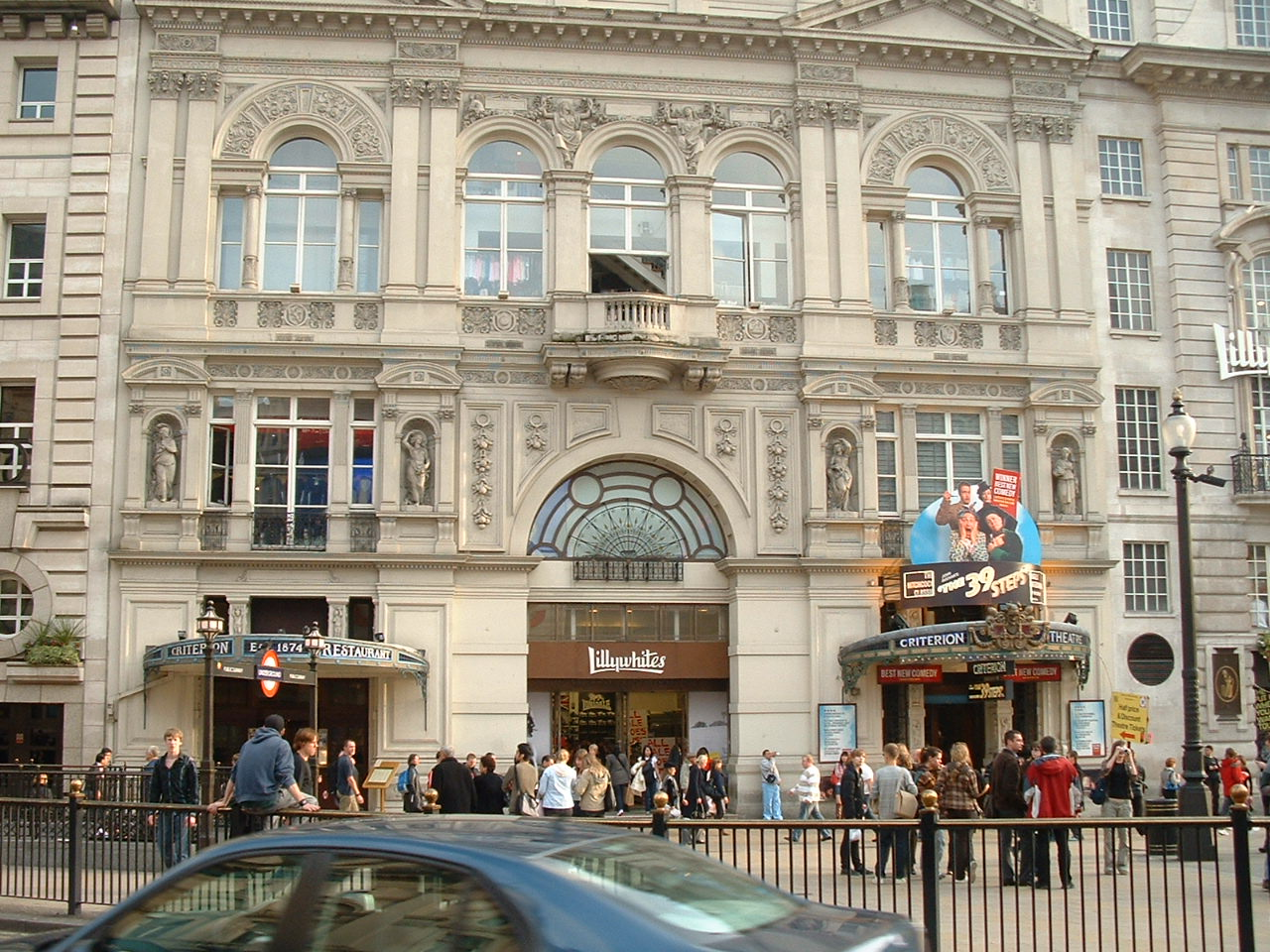
The play debuted at London's Criterion Theatre in 1921.

The play was previewed at the Theatre Royal, Brighton on 11 July 1921, under the title Spanish Treasure. After being retitled Ambrose Applejohn's Adventure, it made its West End debut at the Criterion Theatre on 19 July 1921. Charles Hawtrey produced and starred as Applejohn; Marion Lorne played Poppy Faire. The play continued at the Criterion over a year, until 19 August 1922, with 454 performances. It then moved to the Savoy Theatre on the Strand, opening there on 2 October 1922 and running until 27 January 1923, with 139 performances.

While the West End production was still ongoing, a Broadway production was launched, this time titled Captain Applejack. Wallace Eddinger played Applejohn, with Phoebe Foster as Faire. Sam H. Harris produced. It opened on 30 December 1921 at the Cort Theatre, where it ran for 195 performances, closing in June 1922.

In 1922 the play made its first appearance in Australia, opening at the Criterion Theatre in Sydney on 2 September 1922, with Lawrence Grossmith starring as Applejohn.

== Cast and characters ==
The characters and cast from the West End and Broadway productions are given below:

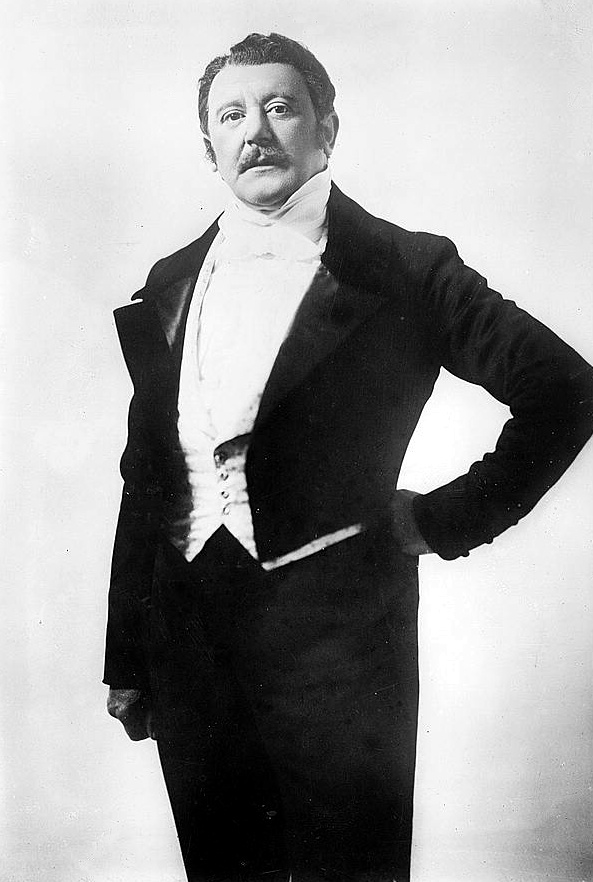
Charles Hawtrey produced and starred in the West End production.

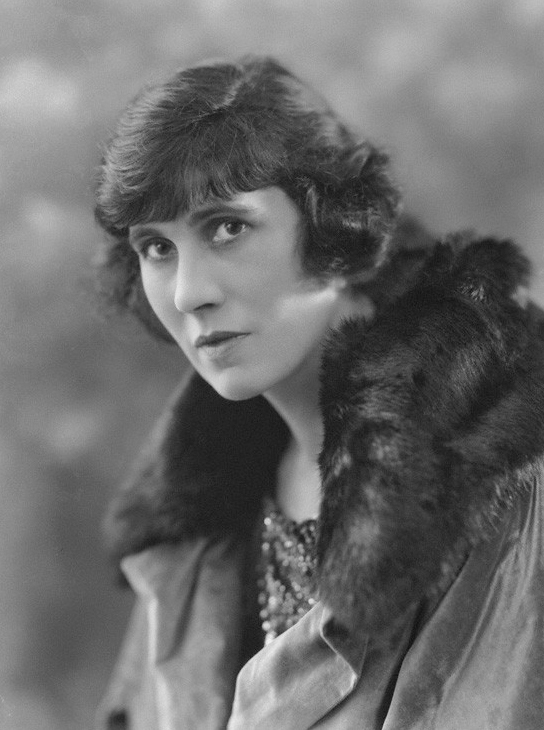
Hilda Moore played Anna Valeska in the West End production.

Cast of the West End and Broadway productions
Character	Criterion Theatre cast	Savoy Theatre cast	Cort Theatre cast
Ambrose Applejohn	Charles Hawtrey	Charles Hawtrey	Wallace Eddinger
Poppy Faire	Marion Lorne	Marion Lorne	Phoebe Foster
Horace Pengard	Edward Rigby	Edward Rigby; Alec F. Thompson	Ferdinand Gottschalk
Lush	Arthur Fayne	Arthur Fayne	John Gray
Mrs. Pengard	Annie Esmond	Annie Esmond	Helen Lackaye
Anna Valeska	Hilda Moore	Hilda Moore	Mary Nash
Ivan Borolsky	Leslie Faber; Clifton Alderson	William Stack	Hamilton Revelle
Dennett	Wilson Blake; C. Fairlie	Wilson Blake	Walter F. Scott
Johnny Jason	H. V. Surrey; Austin Fairman	Austin Fairman	Harold Vermilye
Mrs. Agatha Whatcombe	Mona Harrison	Mona Harrison	Marie Wainwright
Marie	Winifred McCarthy; Christine Rayner	Christine Rayner	
Palmer			Maud Andrew

== Reception ==
A reviewer for The Spectator "thoroughly enjoyed" the play, despite criticizing it as "silly" and "loosely put together". In The New York Times, Alexander Woollcott praised the play as a "droll and ingenious farce".

== Adaptations ==
In 1923, Louis B. Mayer produced an adaptation of the play as a silent film, titled Strangers of the Night, directed by Fred Niblo, and which starred Matt Moore, Enid Bennett, and Barbara La Marr.

Warner Brothers produced a sound film adaptation, titled Captain Applejack, in 1931. John Halliday and Mary Brian starred, with direction by Hobart Henley.

In 1933, R. P. Weston and Bert Lee created a stage musical, He Wanted Adventure, based on Hackett's play.
