= Bachelor Apartment =

1931 film

- Theatrical film poster
- Directed by: Lowell Sherman
- Screenplay by: J. Walter Ruben
- Story by: John Howard Lawson
- Produced by: William LeBaron
- Starring: Lowell Sherman; Irene Dunne
- Cinematography: Leo Tover
- Edited by: Marie Halvey
- Music by: Max Steiner
- Production company: RKO Radio Pictures
- Distributed by: RKO Radio Pictures
- Release date: April 15, 1931 (US)
- Running time: 72-77 minutes
- Country: United States
- Language: English

Bachelor Apartment is a 1931 American pre-Code romance film directed by and starring Lowell Sherman as a bachelor/playboy, Wayne Carter, who falls in love with Irene Dunne's honest working girl, Helene Andrews. The credits for the film, and all sources from that time show that the film was based on a story by New York playwright John Howard Lawson, the screenplay was adapted by J. Walter Ruben. However, Lawson would later claim that the final screenplay had not been altered from what he had originally written. The cast features Mae Murray (a former silent film star, who was attempting to make a comeback in talkies), Norman Kerry and Ivan Lebedeff.

== Plot ==
Wayne Carter is a New York bachelor/playboy, who pays no attention to the marital status of his many dalliances. However, there are some women whose attention he attempts to avoid, one such being the married Agatha Carraway.

Helene and Lita Andrews are small town girls who have come to the big city in order to find fame and fortune. Helene is much more sensible than her younger sister, Lita, who is a bit flighty. Eventually, Lita believes she has a millionaire interested in her, Carter. When she goes to have dinner at his apartment, an alarmed Helene goes to track her down to prevent anything untoward from occurring. However, upon her arrival, she discovers that Lita has really attracted the attention of Carter's butler, Rollins, with whom she is having dinner.

Carter is entranced with the sensible, earnest Helene. Discovering she is in need of employment, he offers her a job in his office as an executive secretary. She at first refuses, cautious about his intentions, but in need of work, she eventually relents and accepts the position. Their mutual attraction grows, and Carter is seemingly beginning to give up his libidinous liaisons, until one afternoon when Carter asks her over to his apartment, not on a personal level, but to take some dictation. Again leery, she agrees and meets him at his apartment, and all is going well until the flirtatious Agatha shows up at the apartment. When her husband shows up shortly after, and Agatha hides in the bedroom while the two men have a discussion about marital issues, Helene once again becomes disenchanted with Carter, and resigns her position.

Realizing that he is truly in love with Helene, Carter is relentless in attempting to convince her of his sincerity, and of his deep feelings for her. Eventually, she comes to believe him, and agrees to meet him at his apartment. Unfortunately, Agatha is also relentless, and shows up once again. This time, when her husband shows up slightly later, he is armed and threatens Carter, since he knows his wife is hiding in the bedroom. To save Carter, Helene, who was with Agatha in the bedroom, exits, and swears that she is the only woman in the apartment. Mollified, Caraway leaves. After Agatha also departs, Carter is relieved and thinks everything is all right, but Helene is upset over the entire episode, and leaves deeply upset.

Carter is distraught, thinking he has lost the woman he loves. Helene rebuffs all of his attempts to win her back. Nothing works, until Lita runs off to live in sin with a musical producer, Lee Graham. Carter had introduced the two, in an attempt to further endear himself to Helene, since he found out that Lita dreamed of being a stage performer. Helene is beside herself with worry, since she has no idea on how to find Lita and Graham. She turns to Carter, who tracks them down, and reunites the two sisters. Helene finally understands that Carter is being sincere, and accepts his proposal of marriage.

== Cast ==
- Lowell Sherman as Wayne Carter
- Irene Dunne as Helene Andrews
- Mae Murray as Mrs. Agatha Carraway
- Ivan Lebedeff as Henri De Maneau
- Norman Kerry as Lee Graham
- Arline Judge as Second Girl in Ladies Room (uncredited)
- Noel Francis as Janet
- Claudia Dell as Lita Andrews
- Purnell Pratt as Henry Carraway
- Kitty Kelly as Miss Clark
- Charles Coleman as Rollins

== Production ==
Bachelor Apartment was the fifth film directed by Lowell Sherman, who directed his first film, a comedy short called Phipps, in 1929. The combination of actor and director was highly unusual at the time.

John Howard Lawson, who wrote the story for Bachelor Apartment was a Broadway playwright who had also written some films for MGM, but was primarily interested in writing plays. Out of financial need, he signed with RKO, for a single screenplay, with an option for three more. Starting simply with the lead cast of Sherman and Murray, Lawson devised the story and screenplay of Bachelor Apartment, but did not think much of the experience, or the film: ""Every day's work on Bachelor Apartment reminded me of my 'almost-blunted purpose': instead of bringing new life to the theater, I was perpetrating a stale cinematic joke. In spite of its up-to-date cynicism and zany style, everything about Bachelor Apartment, including its stars, belonged to the Roaring Twenties." Despite the screen credit given to J. Walter Ruben for adaptation and dialogue, Lawson claimed that the script was filmed as he wrote it. Lawson later went on to write Theory and Technique of Playwriting and Screenwriting, to become the head of the Screen Writers Guild, to write films such as 1938's Algiers and Sahara (1943), and to be blacklisted as one of the Hollywood Ten.

== Reception ==
The film received mostly favorable reviews, although several were lukewarm. Photoplay called the film a "... sophisticated story interesting from start to finish", while Motion Picture Magazine said the movie was "sophisticated" and "entertaining", praising both the direction and acting. Silver Screen, however, stating that only Lowell's performance saved the film from "utter triteness". Mordaunt Hall, of The New York Times, gave the film a somewhat positive review, praising both Lowell and Coleman, as well as several other players, but merely calling Dunne's performance "competent". Overall, he stated, "For the most part it is a sophisticated comedy with a Parisian flair. It is equipped with elaborate modernistic settings and effectively photographed. Highly improbable though most of the action is, there is no gainsaying that it accomplished its purpose in arousing waves of merriment from an audience at the first showing."

== Notes ==
Bachelor Apartment was Irene Dunne's third film, after the now-lost Leathernecking (1930) and 1931's Cimarron, for which she would be nominated for her first Academy Award.

Mae Murray was a star of the vaudeville stage who had made the successful transition to silent films. This film was her second talkie, in an attempt to make the transition to this medium. However, it turned out to be her penultimate film, the final film being High Stakes in 1931, as her attempt was unsuccessful.
