= The Scarlet Dove =

- The Scarlet Dove (1928 film)
- The Scarlet Dove (1961 film)
