= Captain Applejack =

1931 film

- Theatrical release poster
- Directed by: Hobart Henley
- Screenplay by: Maude Fulton
- Based on: Captain Appliejack by Walter Hackett
- Starring: John Halliday; Mary Brian; Arthur Edmund Carewe
- Cinematography: Ira H. Morgan
- Edited by: Harold McLernon
- Music by: Leonid S. Leonardi; Edmund Ross; Erno Rapee; Louis Silvers
- Production company: Warner Bros. Pictures
- Distributed by: Warner Bros. Pictures
- Release date: January 31, 1931
- Running time: 63 minutes
- Country: United States
- Language: English

Captain Applejack is a 1931 American pre-Code comedy film, produced and distributed by Warner Bros. Pictures. The film was directed by Hobart Henley and stars John Halliday, Mary Brian, and Arthur Edmund Carewe. The film was based on a 1921 play of the same name, starring Wallace Eddinger and written by Walter Hackett. The play had previously been filmed as a silent film in 1923 under the title of Strangers of the Night.

== Plot ==
Ambrose Applejohn lives in an extravagant old mansion with his ward, Poppy Faire, and his elderly aunt. Poppy is in love with Applejohn but he doesn't realize it and treats her like a child. Applejohn is bored with his sheltered, mundane life and craves excitement. He plans to sell the family mansion and use the money to travel around the world on a quest for adventure and excitement.

Aunt Agatha is shocked when she finds out about her nephew's plans while Poppy supports him. Applejohn, however, soon finds unexpected adventure, danger, mystery and excitement right in his own house. On a dark and stormy night, a mysterious woman, Madame Anna Valeska, knocks on the door, seeking shelter from the storm and from a violent man, Ivan Borolsky, who is apparently pursuing her. As a matter of fact, the two are a pair of thieves seeking a treasure which is hidden in the Applejohn home. This treasure was hidden in the house by a pirate ancestor, known as Captain Applejack.

Ivan Borolsky shows up at the house but, eventually, Applejohn manages to get Borolsky and Valeska out of the house. Applejohn falls asleep and dreams of his pirate ancestor, of his ship, and of his conquest of a pretty woman, who is at first resistant, but in the end completely surrenders to him. When he awakes he finds that a parchment really exists in the house and that his visitors are really thieves and are seeking a hidden treasure. He races to find the treasures indicated on the parchment before the thieves can find it themselves. In the end he put the villains to rout, finds the treasure and discovers that he also loves Poppy.

=== Pre-Code aspects ===
The film is filled with pre-code material, especially during the pirate dream sequence. During that sequence, Captain Applejack brazenly forces a woman to submit to his sexual advances and actually grabs her breasts.

== Cast ==
- John Halliday as Ambrose Applejohn
- Mary Brian as Poppy Faire
- Kay Strozzi as Madame Anna Valeska
- Arthur Edmund Carewe as Ivan "Jim" Borolsky
- Alec B. Francis as Lush, the butler
- Louise Closser Hale as Aunt Agatha
- Claud Allister as John Jason
- Julia Swayne Gordon as Mrs. Kate Pengard
- Otto Hoffman as Horace Pengard
- William B. Davidson as Bill Dennett
