= Strangers of the Night =

1923 film

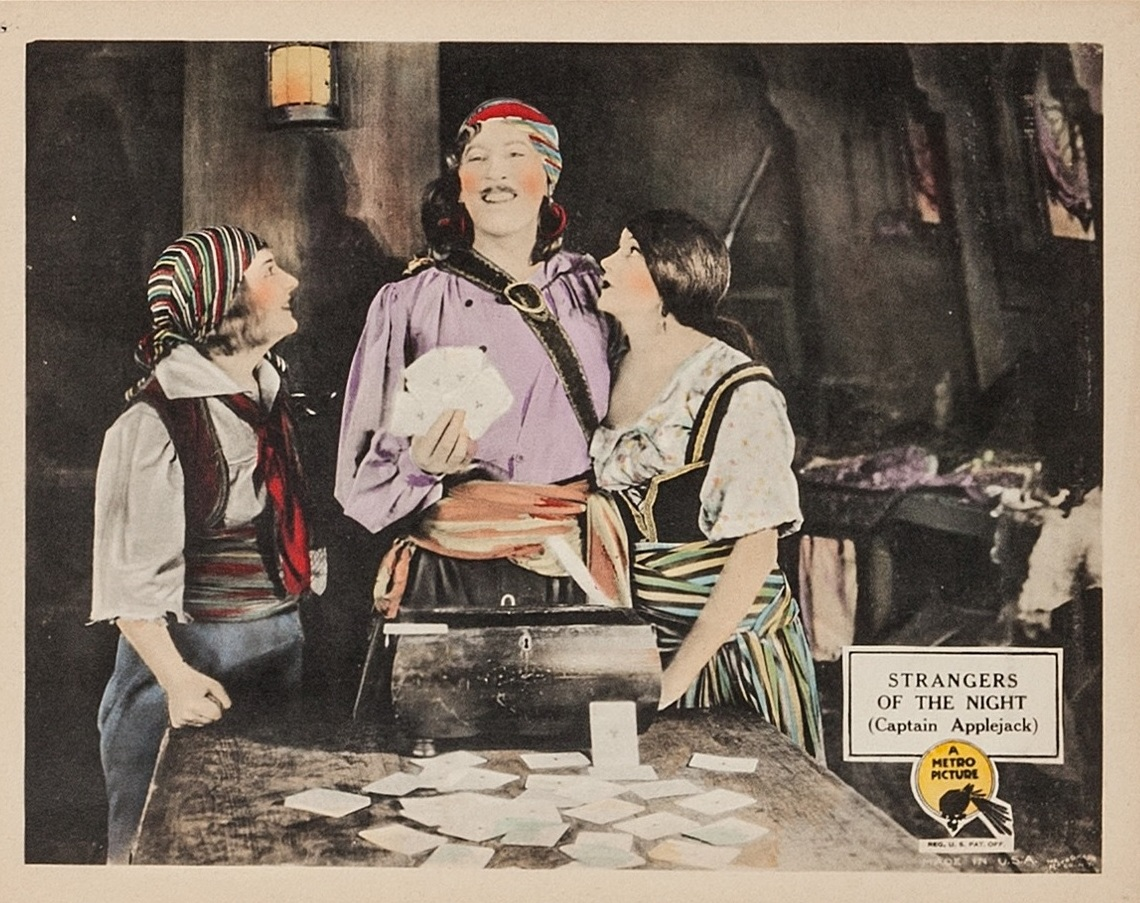
- Lobby card
- Directed by: Fred Niblo
- Written by: Lenore J. Coffee; Bess Meredyth; Renaud Hoffman; C. Gardner Sullivan
- Based on: Captain Applejack by Walter Hackett
- Produced by: Fred Niblo; Louis B. Mayer
- Starring: Matt Moore; Enid Bennett; Barbara La Marr; Robert McKim
- Cinematography: Alvin Wyckoff
- Edited by: Lloyd Nosler
- Production company: Louis B. Mayer Productions
- Distributed by: Metro Pictures
- Release date: September 10, 1923
- Running time: 80 minutes
- Country: United States
- Language: Silent (English intertitles)

Strangers of the Night is a 1923 American silent comedy film directed by Fred Niblo. It was produced by Louis B. Mayer and released through Metro Pictures.

The film was adapted by C. Gardner Sullivan from the 1921 stage play, Captain Applejack, by Walter Hackett, which on Broadway had starred Wallace Eddinger. It was remade as a talkie by Warner Brothers in 1931 under the Captain Applejack title. The 1923 film is now lost.

== Cast ==
- Matt Moore as Ambrose Applejohn
- Enid Bennett as Poppy Faire
- Barbara La Marr as Anna Valeska
- Robert McKim as Borolsky
- Mathilde Brundage as Mrs. Whatcombe
- Emily Fitzroy as Mrs. Pengard
- Otto Hoffman as Horace Pengard
- Tom Ricketts as Lush (as Thomas Ricketts)
