= Charles Coleman (actor) =

American film and television actor (1885–1951)

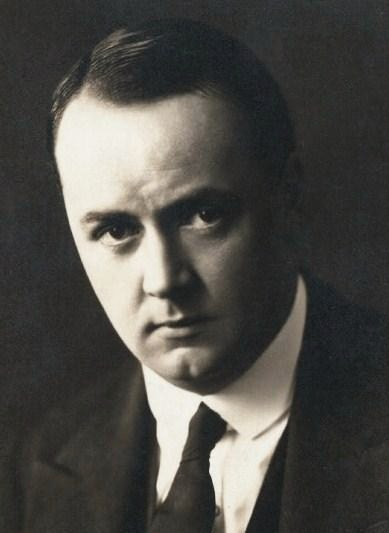
- Coleman c.1910
- Born: Charles Pearce Coleman; December 22, 1885; Sydney, New South Wales, Australia
- Died: March 8, 1951 (aged 65); Woodland Hills, California, U.S.
- Occupation: Actor
- Years active: 1915–1949
- Spouse: Beatrice

Charles Pearce Coleman (December 22, 1885 – March 8, 1951) was an Australian-American character actor of the silent and sound film eras, frequently portraying butlers and other manservants.

== Early years ==
Coleman was born in Sydney, New South Wales, Australia, on December 22, 1885.

== Career ==
Coleman began his film career in the 1915 silent film, The Mummy and the Humming Bird, which was also the screen debut of Charles Cherry, a noted stage actor. In more than half of his 200 performances in films, he appeared as a butler, doorman/concierge, valet, or waiter. In the 1930s, Coleman appeared in such films as Beyond Victory (1931), starring Bill Boyd and James Gleason, the Wheeler & Woolsey comedy Diplomaniacs (1933), 1934's Born to Be Bad which starred Loretta Young and Cary Grant, the 1934 version of Of Human Bondage starring Bette Davis and Leslie Howard, the first film to star the pairing of Fred Astaire and Ginger Rogers, The Gay Divorcee (1935), the first feature-length film to be shot entirely in Technicolor, Becky Sharp, 1936's Magnificent Obsession starring Irene Dunne and Robert Taylor, the Spencer Tracy vehicle, Captains Courageous (1937), The Prince and the Pauper (1937), starring Errol Flynn and Claude Rains, and the Reginald Owen version of A Christmas Carol (1938).

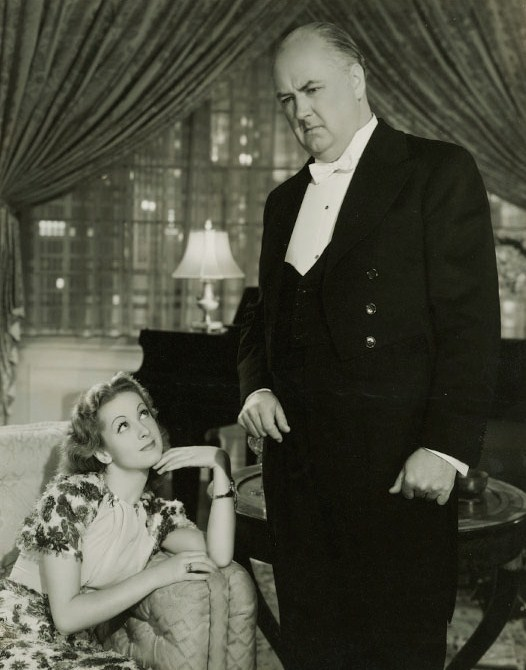
Danielle Darrieux and Charles Coleman in The Rage of Paris (1938)

In the 1940s, Coleman's films included: Buck Privates (1941), the first film starring the comedy duo of Abbott and Costello; 1943's Du Barry Was a Lady, starring Red Skelton, Lucille Ball, and Gene Kelly; Orson Welles and Joan Fontaine in the 1944 version of Jane Eyre; the 1945 film The Picture of Dorian Gray, with George Sanders, Donna Reed, Angela Lansbury, and Peter Lawford; and the 1949 comedy A Connecticut Yankee in King Arthur's Court, starring Bing Crosby and Rhonda Fleming.

The last film Coleman worked on was the Gene Autry vehicle, The Blazing Sun, (1950). Double Dynamite (1951), starring Jane Russell, Groucho Marx, and Frank Sinatra, was the final film released in which he appeared. Coleman had worked on the film in 1948, but it was shelved for several years by Howard Hughes, and not released until after Coleman's death.

Coleman's work on stage included being leading man for Pauline Frederick in productions that toured Australia and the United States. On Broadway, he performed in Porgy and Bess (1943), Amourette (1933), Face the Music (1932), Nina Rosa (1930), Colonel Newcome (1917), The Merry Wives of Windsor (1916), The Adventure of Lady Ursula (1915), and Secret Strings (1914).

== Death ==
Coleman died of a stroke at the Motion Picture Country Home in Los Angeles on March 8, 1951, at age 66 and was cremated and interred at Chapel Of The Pines Crematory in Los Angeles.

== Filmography ==
(Per AFI database)

- The Mummy and the Hummingbird (1915)
- When We Were Twenty-One (1915)
- The Love Cheat (1919)
- The Place of Honeymoons (1920)
- Big Dan (1923)
- Second Hand Love (1923)
- That French Lady (1924)
- The Vagabond Trail (1924)
- Sandy (1926)
- Good Morning, Judge (1928)
- That's My Daddy (1928)
- Lawful Larceny (1930)
- Once a Gentleman (1930)
- What a Man (1930)
- Beyond Victory (1931)
- Bachelor Apartment (1931)
- Young as You Feel (1931)
- Her Majesty Love (1931)
- High Stakes (1931)
- The Heart of New York (1932)
- Union Depot (1932)
- One Hour with You (1932)
- Winner Take All (1932)
- Play Girl (1932)
- A Successful Calamity (1932)
- Jewel Robbery (1932)
- Merrily We Go to Hell (1932)
- Are You Listening? (1932)
- The Washington Masquerade (1932)
- As the Devil Commands (1932)
- Diplomaniacs (1933)
- The Little Giant (1933)
- I Loved a Woman (1933)
- Baby Face (1933)
- Midnight Club (1933)
- Sailor Be Good (1933)
- Walls of Gold (1933)
- Born to Be Bad (1934)
- The Little Minister (1934)
- David Harum (1934)
- Down to Their Last Yacht (1934)
- Gallant Lady (1934)
- Of Human Bondage (1934)
- Housewife (1934)
- Lady by Choice (1934)
- Shock (1934)
- The Merry Frinks (1934)
- Million Dollar Ransom (1934)
- The Gay Divorcee (1934)
- The Girl from Missouri (1934)
- Embarrassing Moments (1934)
- His Family Tree (1935)
- Rendezvous (1935)
- Becky Sharp (1935)
- The Bishop Misbehaves (1935)
- The Goose and the Gander (1935)
- The Man Who Broke the Bank at Monte Carlo (1935)
- The Perfect Gentleman (1935)
- No More Ladies (1935)
- Whipsaw (1935)
- Murder Man (1935)
- Kind Lady (1935)
- Three Kids and a Queen (1935)
- The Widow from Monte Carlo (1935)
- Magnificent Obsession (1936)
- Sins of Man (1936)
- Fury (1936)
- The King Steps Out (1936)
- Colleen (1936)
- The Return of Sophie Lang (1936)
- The White Angel (1936)
- The Border Patrolman (1936)
- Mummy's Boys (1936)
- Her Master's Voice (1936)
- Walking on Air (1936)
- Poor Little Rich Girl (1936)
- Born to Dance (1936)
- Don't Get Personal (1936)
- The Devil Is a Sissy (1936)
- Everybody's Old Man (1936)
- The Great Ziegfeld (1936)
- Lloyd's of London (1936)
- Captains Courageous (1937) as Burns, the Butler (uncredited)
- Fight for Your Lady (1937)
- There Goes My Girl (1937)
- Big Town Girl (1937)
- The Prince and the Pauper (1937)
- The Last Gangster (1937)
- Shall We Dance (1937)
- Too Many Wives (1937)
- Merry-Go-Round of 1938 (1937)
- Love Is News (1937)
- Danger – Love at Work (1937)
- Double Wedding (1937)
- Gateway (1938)
- The Rage of Paris (1938)
- The Shining Hour (1938)
- A Christmas Carol (1938)
- Little Miss Broadway (1938)
- The Affairs of Annabel (1938)
- Alexander's Ragtime Band (1938)
- Always Goodbye (1938)
- Radio City Revels (1938)
- Carefree (1938)
- That Certain Age (1938)
- Lord Jeff (1938)
- You Can't Cheat an Honest Man (1939)
- Beauty for the Asking (1939)
- In Name Only (1939)
- Bridal Suite (1939)
- First Love (1939)
- Pardon Our Nerve (1939)
- Man About Town (1939)
- Maisie (1939)
- The Under-Pup (1939)
- Mexican Spitfire Out West (1940)
- Mexican Spitfire (1940)
- The Earl of Chicago (1940)
- Cross-Country Romance (1940)
- Brother Orchid (1940) as English diamond salesman (uncredited)
- The Westerner (1940)
- Phantom Raiders (1940)
- Andy Hardy Meets Debutante (1940)
- Buck Privates (1941)
- Design for Scandal (1941)
- Free and Easy (1941)
- It Started with Eve (1941)
- Maisie Was a Lady (1941)
- Meet the Chump (1941)
- Melody Lane (1941)
- Moonlight in Hawaii (1941)
- Repent at Leisure (1941)
- Sis Hopkins (1941)
- West Point Widow (1941)
- Michael Shayne, Private Detective (1941)
- Almost Married (1942)
- Arabian Nights (1942)
- Between Us Girls (1942)
- The Great Impersonation (1942)
- Highways by Night (1942)
- Jail House Blues (1942)
- Lady in a Jam (1942)
- Miss Annie Rooney (1942)
- Pittsburgh (1942)
- Right to the Heart (1942)
- They All Kissed the Bride (1942)
- Twin Beds (1942)
- What's Cookin'? (1942)
- Yokel Boy (1942)
- Du Barry Was a Lady (1943)
- Fired Wife (1943)
- Gals, Incorporated (1943)
- Girl Crazy (1943)
- He Hired the Boss (1943)
- Hi'ya, Sailor (1943)
- It Ain't Hay (1943)
- It Comes Up Love (1943)
- Mexican Spitfire's Blessed Event (1943)
- Petticoat Larceny (1943)
- She's for Me (1943)
- Sherlock Holmes Faces Death (1943)
- Two Tickets to London (1943)
- Air Raid Wardens (1943)
- Jane Eyre (1943)
- The White Cliffs of Dover (1944)
- In Society (1944)
- Frenchman's Creek (1944)
- Lady in the Dark (1944)
- Marriage Is a Private Affair (1944)
- Mrs. Parkington (1944)
- Once Upon a Time (1944)
- The Whistler (1944)
- Anchors Aweigh (1945)
- Billy Rose's Diamond Horseshoe (1945)
- Earl Carroll Vanities (1945)
- The Gay Senorita (1945)
- Hangover Square (1945)
- The Missing Corpse (1945)
- The Picture of Dorian Gray (1945)
- Roughly Speaking (1945)
- Song of the Prairie (1945)
- The Stork Club (1945)
- Kitty (1946)
- Cluny Brown (1946)
- In Fast Company (1946)
- I've Always Loved You (1946)
- The Magnificent Rogue (1946)
- Monsieur Beaucaire (1946)
- Never Say Goodbye (1946)
- The Runaround (1946)
- Two Guys from Milwaukee (1946)
- Ziegfeld Follies (1946)
- Danger Street (1947)
- The Imperfect Lady (1947)
- Ladies' Man (1947)
- The Lone Wolf in London (1947)
- Love from a Stranger (1947)
- Lured (1947)
- The Pilgrim Lady (1947)
- Variety Girl (1947)
- Grand Canyon Trail (1948)
- Three Daring Daughters (1948)
- A Connecticut Yankee in King Arthur's Court (1949)
- Trouble Makers (1949)
- The Blazing Sun (1950)
- Ma and Pa Kettle Go to Town (1950)
- Valentino (1951) (1951)
- Double Dynamite (1951)
