= Yvonne Hughes =

American actress

- Born: Yvonne Evelyn Hughes; 1900; McKeesport, Pennsylvania
- Died: December 26, 1950 (aged 50); New York City, New York
- Occupations: Actress, dancer
- Spouse: Gordon Godowsky (1928–1929)
- Partner: John McDonald (1936–1950)

Yvonne Evelyn Hughes (1900 - December 26, 1950) was a dancer in the Ziegfeld Follies and an actress in silent motion pictures.

== Biography ==
=== Career and personal life ===
Hughes appeared in films with Gloria Swanson and once danced with Rudolph Valentino. Her movie appearances came in 1923 and 1924. She had roles in Lawful Larceny, Zaza, Big Brother, A Society Scandal, and Monsieur Beaucaire. She also appeared in Rio Rita, and Whoopi! 1928-1929, a musical comedy. She was married to Charles Alvin Hamilton Feick October 20, 1917, in Wellsburg, West Virginia, US, and divorced him on November 6, 1920. They had a son Charles A “Papa” Feick, Jr born May 30, 1918, in McKeesport, Pennsylvania, and died November 8, 1988, in the state of Maryland. In 1928, Hughes married Gordon Godowsky, son of Leopold Godowsky. The marriage lasted one year. In 1932, Godowsky committed suicide over financial trouble.

=== Murder ===
On December 26, 1950, Hughes was murdered in the New York City hotel room of Birger Nordkvist, a Swedish apple picker who worked for a western New York cider firm. Earlier that night, Nordkvist got into a cab driven by John McDonald, who had lived with Hughes for fourteen years. McDonald offered to take him to the Ashland Hotel, where he kept a room. Nordkvist met Hughes, who demonstrated some old dance routines for him, and they drank beer through the night and into the next morning; all the while, McDonald was driving his taxi. After Hughes rebuffed Nordkvist's advances, Nordkvist strangled her by tying his handkerchief around her throat and stuffing a silk scarf into her mouth. Nordkvist was arrested in Utica, New York, where he went after leaving the hotel.

== Selected filmography ==
- Zaza (1923)
- Lawful Larceny (1923)
- A Society Scandal (1924)
- Monsieur Beaucaire (1924)
