= A Society Scandal =

1924 film by Allan Dwan

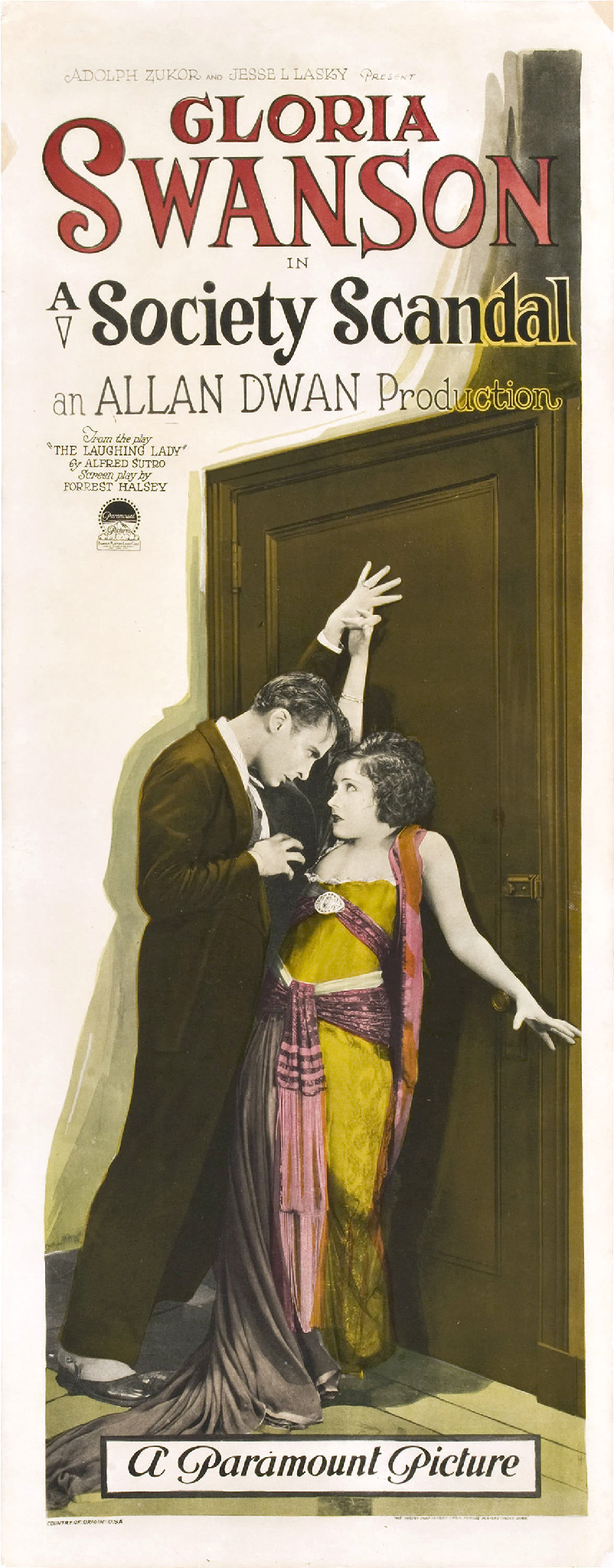
- Film long poster
- Directed by: Allan Dwan
- Written by: Forrest Halsey
- Based on: The Laughing Lady by Alfred Sutro
- Starring: Gloria Swanson; Rod La Rocque
- Cinematography: Harold Rosson
- Distributed by: Paramount Pictures
- Release date: March 9, 1924
- Running time: 7 reels
- Country: United States
- Language: Silent (English intertitles)

A Society Scandal is a 1924 American silent drama film directed by Allan Dwan, and starring Gloria Swanson and Rod La Rocque. Distributed by Paramount Pictures, the film is based on a 1922 play The Laughing Lady, by Alfred Sutro which starred Ethel Barrymore in 1923 on Broadway and originally in 1922 with Edith Evans in UK.

Paramount remade the story in 1929 as The Laughing Lady, an early talkie for Ruth Chatterton.

== Plot ==
Marjorie Colbert and her husband Hector disagree continually. She becomes compromised by an unconventional visit paid to her room by Harrison Peters. Hector sues and obtains a divorce, his success being due to the eloquent attack on Marjorie's reputation made by made by his lawyer, Daniel Farr. Marjorie plans a revenge on Daniel by vamping him and enticing him to her apartment, where she then screams for help. The lawyer's reputation suffers, but Marjorie suddenly repents of her scheme when she realizes that Daniel and her love each other. He forgives her and all ends well.

== Cast ==
- Gloria Swanson as Marjorie Colbert
- Rod La Rocque as Daniel Farr
- Ricardo Cortez as Harrison Peters
- Allan Simpson as Hector Colbert
- Ida Waterman as Mrs. Maturin Colbert
- Thelma Converse as Mrs. Hamilton Pennfield
- Catherine Coleburn as Friend of Marjorie
- Catherine Proctor as Mrs. Burr
- Wilfred Donovan as Hamilton Pennfield
- Yvonne Hughes as Patricia DeVoe
- Marie Shelton as Friend of Marjorie
- Dorothy Stokes as Friend of Marjorie
- Cornelius Keefe as Friend of Marjorie
- Fraser Coalter as Schuyler Burr

== Preservation ==
With no copies of A Society Scandal located in any film archives, it is a lost film.
