= Marie Halvey =

American film editor

- Born: October 16, 1895; Chicago, Illinois, USA
- Died: June 11, 1967 (aged 71); Los Angeles, California, USA
- Occupation: Film editor
- Relatives: Geraldine Halvey (sister)

Marie Halvey (1895–1967) was an American film editor known for her work during the late 1920s and early 1930s.

Early Life

Halvey was born in Chicago, Illinois, to John Halvey and Sarah Casey. In the early 1920s, she moved to Los Angeles with her sister Geraldine, who later became Hal Roach bathing girl and wife of stuntman Leo Nomis.

Halvey began her career in the film industry as a stenographer, working for Archie Mayo at Samuel Goldwyn Studio. She eventually worked her way into a continuity role and finally an editing role, working on a string of Herbert Brenon films. As her career progressed, she also worked as a script girl for directors like Ernst Lubitsch and H.C. Potter.

== Selected filmography ==
- Bachelor Apartment (1931)
- Beau Ideal (1931)
- Lawful Larceny (1930)
- The Case of Sergeant Grischa (1930)
- Lummox (1930)
- The Rescue (1929)
- Laugh, Clown, Laugh (1928)
- Sorrell and Son (1927)
