= The Masked Dancer (film) =

1924 film by Burton L. King

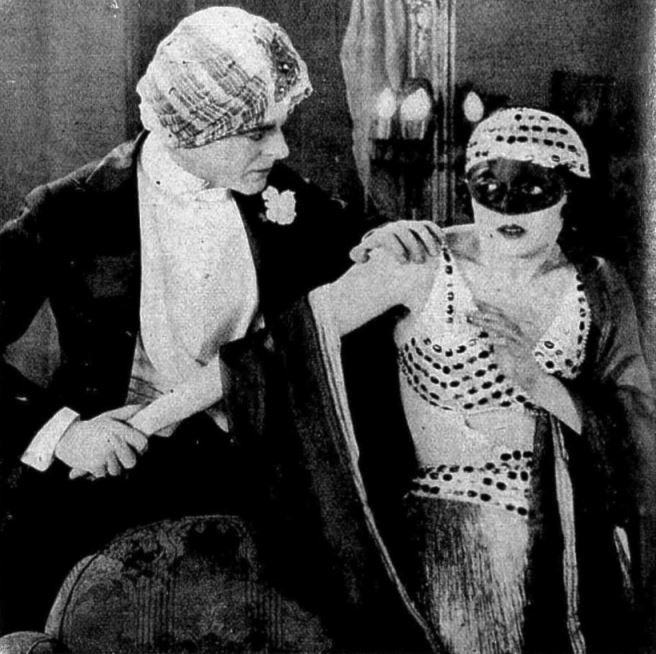
- Still with Lowell Sherman and Helene Chadwick
- Directed by: Burton L. King; Ben Silvey (ass't director)
- Written by: John Lynch
- Based on: Die Frau mit der Maske by Rudolph Lothar
- Produced by: Eastern Productions
- Starring: Helene Chadwick; Lowell Sherman
- Cinematography: Charles J. Davis; Neil Sullivan
- Distributed by: Principal Distributing
- Release date: February 15, 1924
- Running time: 5 reels
- Country: United States
- Language: Silent (English intertitles)

The Masked Dancer is a 1924 American silent romance film directed by Burton L. King and starring Lowell Sherman and Helene Chadwick. The film is based upon the play Die Frau mit der Maske by Rudolph Lothar.

== Cast ==
- Lowell Sherman as Prince Madhe Azhar
- Helene Chadwick as Betty Powell
- Leslie Austin as Robert Powell
- Joe King as Fred Sinclair
- Arthur Housman (uncredited)

== Preservation ==
With no prints of The Masked Dancer located in any film archives, The Masked Dancer is a lost film. A 30-second clip of the film showing a masked woman dancing still exists.
