= Say It with Diamonds (1927 film) =

1927 film

- Directed by: Jack Nelson; Arthur Gregor
- Written by: Leon Lee (intertitles)
- Produced by: I. E. Chadwick
- Starring: Betty Compson; Earle Williams
- Cinematography: Ernest Miller
- Edited by: Gene Milford
- Distributed by: First Division Pictures; Chadwick Pictures
- Release date: June 2, 1927
- Running time: 7 reels
- Country: United States
- Language: Silent (English intertitles)

Say It with Diamonds is a 1927 American silent drama film starring Betty Compson and Earle Williams, an early Vitagraph leading man and matinee idol. Directed by Jack Nelson and Arthur Gregor, this film is Williams's final screen performance before his death in April 1927.

== Cast ==
- Betty Compson as Betty Howard
- Earle Williams as Horace Howard
- Jocelyn Lee as Fay Demarest
- Armand Kaliz as Armand Armour
- Betty Baker as Secretary

== Preservation ==
Say It with Diamonds is considered completely extant with prints held by the Library of Congress and the George Eastman Museum.
