= Monsieur Beaucaire (novel) =

1900 novel by Booth Tarkington

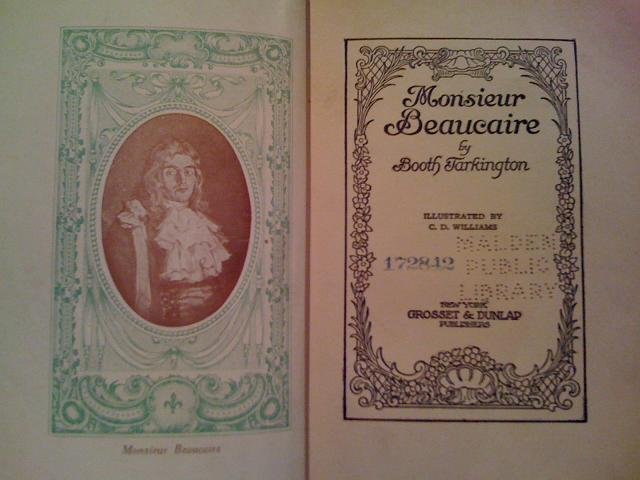
- Frontispiece of an early edition
- Author: Booth Tarkington
- Language: English
- Publisher: Doubleday & McClure Company
- Publication date: 1900
- Publication place: United States
- Media type: Print (hardcover)
- ISBN: 1-117-89405-3

Monsieur Beaucaire is a short novel by Pulitzer Prize-winning author Booth Tarkington that was first published in 1900.

== Plot ==
The setting is Bath during the 18th century. Before the action of the novel begins, Beau Nash, an historical figure who served as Master of Ceremonies of Bath, has ordered M. Beaucaire out of the public rooms because of his low status. Since this incident, Beaucaire, a barber to a French noble, has established a reputation for honesty while gambling with English notables in private.

In the opening scene of the novel, he catches the Duke of Winterset cheating and threatens to expose the Duke, whose honesty is already the subject of gossip. Beaucaire insists Winterset take him to a ball and introduce him as the Duke de Chateaurien to Lady Mary Carlisle, "the Beauty of Bath." Beaucaire as Chateaurien wins the lady’s affection and the admiration of Bath society.

In the days that follow, Beaucaire twice emerges successfully from duels with men who pretend to insult him on their own behalf but are in fact acting on behalf of Winterset.

Beaucaire and several British gentlemen accompany Lady Mary en route from a party. Beaucaire and Lady Mary engage in amorous conversation. Highwaymen attack Beaucaire shouting "barber!" and the others leave him to defend himself. He does so successfully for a time, then is overwhelmed, only to be rescued at last by his servants who were travelling some distance behind. Lady Mary denounces those who failed to come to Beaucaire’s defense. Winterset then emerges from the shadows and, over Lady Mary’s objections and with Beaucaire’s indulgence, tells the story of Beaucaire’s background as a lackey and an imposter, adding some fabrications to explain his own behavior in introducing Beacaire/Chateaurien to Bath society. Beaucaire mocks his words as a mixture of truth and invention. Questioned by the others, he asserts he has never been a barber but admits that he did arrive in England in the role of barber to the French Ambassador, M. de Mirepoix, and is named Beaucaire. One of the English, Molyneux, the only one to demonstrate some sympathy for Beaucaire, notes that his swordsmanship was that of a gentleman. Winterset warns Beaucaire not to appear in public in Bath again. Lady Mary, aghast, refuses to look at Beaucaire and orders her carriage to depart.

That evening, Lady Mary and Winterset are the center of attention in Bath as Nash and fashionable society anticipate the arrival of the French Ambassador and the Comte de Beaujolais, a French prince. The movement of the crowd impels Lady Mary to step aside into a small chamber where she finds Beaucaire and Molyneux gambling. Attempts at explanation fail, Lady Mary insists that Molyneux escort her from the room, and Beaucaire is left alone in tears.

A scene from the play – Beaucaire and Mary

After more confrontations, Beaucaire reveals himself as a French prince, Louis-Philippe d'Orléans, hiding from his cousin, King Louis XV, who is angry at him for failing to submit to an arranged marriage. The ambassador has come to Bath to escort him home now that his royal cousin has relented. In the course of recounting his adventures, Beaucaire calls Winterset "that coward, that card-cheat." Lady Mary asks his forgiveness and he gives it lightly. He announces his intention to return to France and marry the woman the king had chosen for him, Henriette de Bourbon-Conti.

== Adaptations ==
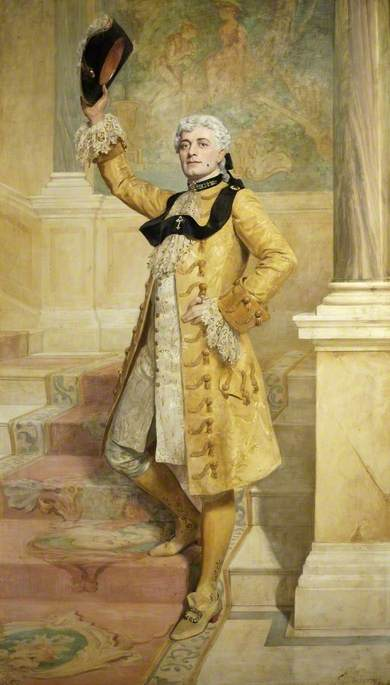
Lewis Waller as Monsieur Beaucaire by John Collier, 1903

The story has been adapted several times. A stage adaptation starring Richard Mansfield premiered on October 11, 1901 for the grand opening of the Garrick Theatre in Philadelphia. In collaboration with Evelyn Greenleaf Sutherland, Tarkington adapted it as a play in 1904 starring Evelyn Millard and Lewis Waller. The play received a Royal Command Performance at Windsor Castle before Edward VII. André Messager used it as the basis for an opera of the same name in 1919. A 1924 film adaptation on which Tarkington was credited as co-author of the screenplay starred Rudolph Valentino. Another film released in 1946 featured Bob Hope. A loose adaptation of the story served as the basis for the 1930 film Monte Carlo directed by Ernst Lubitsch and starring Jeanette MacDonald.
