= Women's Wares =

1927 silent drama film by Arthur Gregor

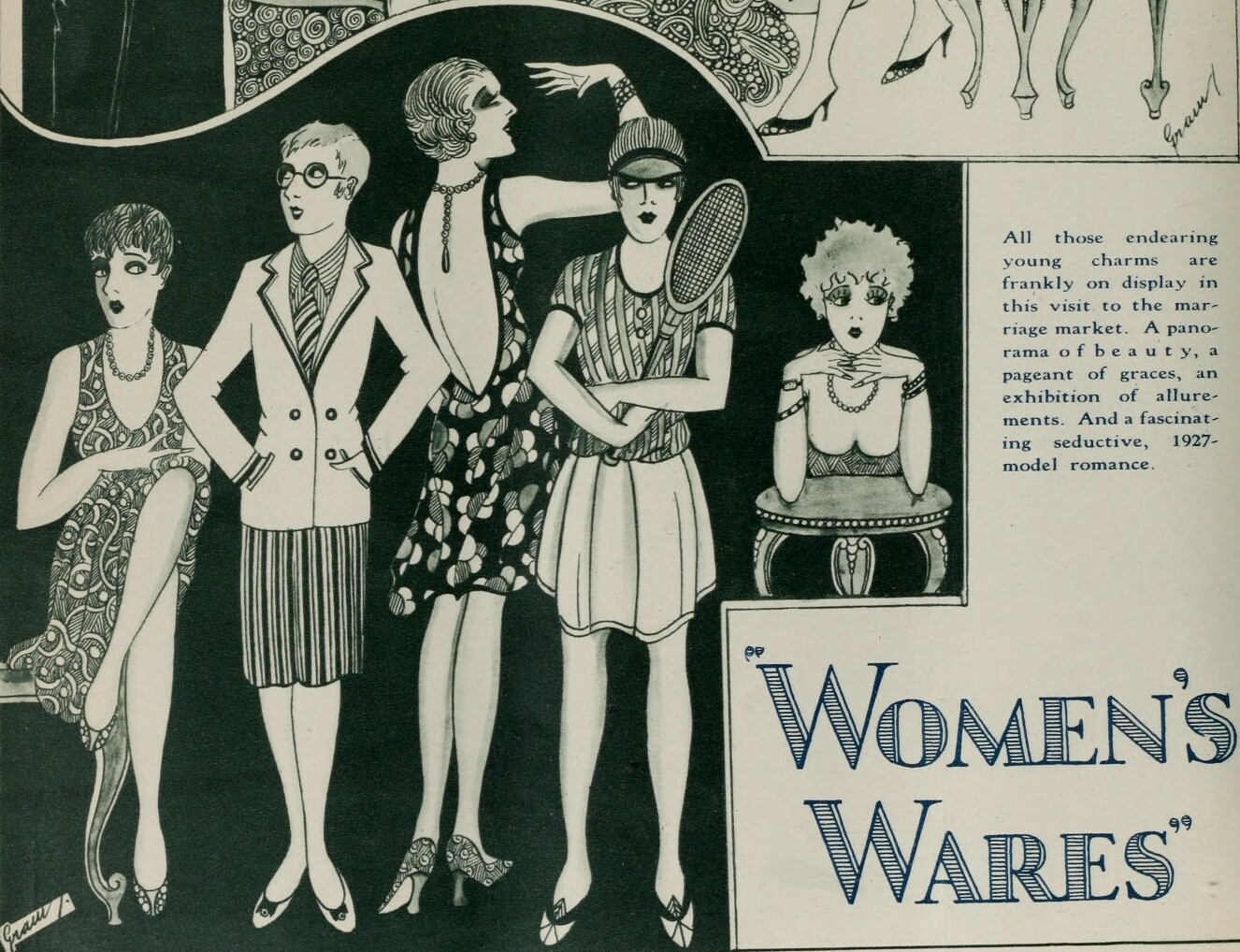
- Advertisement
- Directed by: Arthur Gregor
- Written by: Frances Hyland
- Story by: E. Morton Hough
- Starring: Evelyn Brent
- Cinematography: Chester A. Lyons
- Production company: Tiffany Pictures
- Distributed by: Tiffany Pictures
- Release date: October 1, 1927
- Running time: 6 reels
- Country: United States
- Language: Silent (English intertitles)

Women's Wares is a 1927 American silent romantic drama film directed by Arthur Gregor and starring Evelyn Brent.

== Plot ==
Salesgirl Dolly Morton becomes disillusioned about men after an incident with her boyfriend, so she becomes, with the help of her roommate, a gold digger who takes advantage of men without giving anything in return. However, after the gift of an apartment from a millionaire only results in scorn towards her, she decides to return to her original boyfriend.

== Cast ==
- Evelyn Brent as Dolly Morton
- Bert Lytell as Robert Crane
- Larry Kent as Jimmie Hayes
- Gertrude Short as Maisie Duncan
- Myrtle Stedman as Mrs. James Crane
- Richard Tucker as Frank Stanton
- Cissy Fitzgerald as Mrs. Frank Stanton
- Sylvia Ashton as Patron
- Stanhope Wheatcroft as Floorwalker
- Gino Corrado as Modiste
- Robert Bolder as Boarder
- James T. Mack as Patron (credited as James Mack)

== Preservation ==
A print of Women's Wares is in the film collection of the BFI National Archive.
