= Arthur Gregor =

American film director

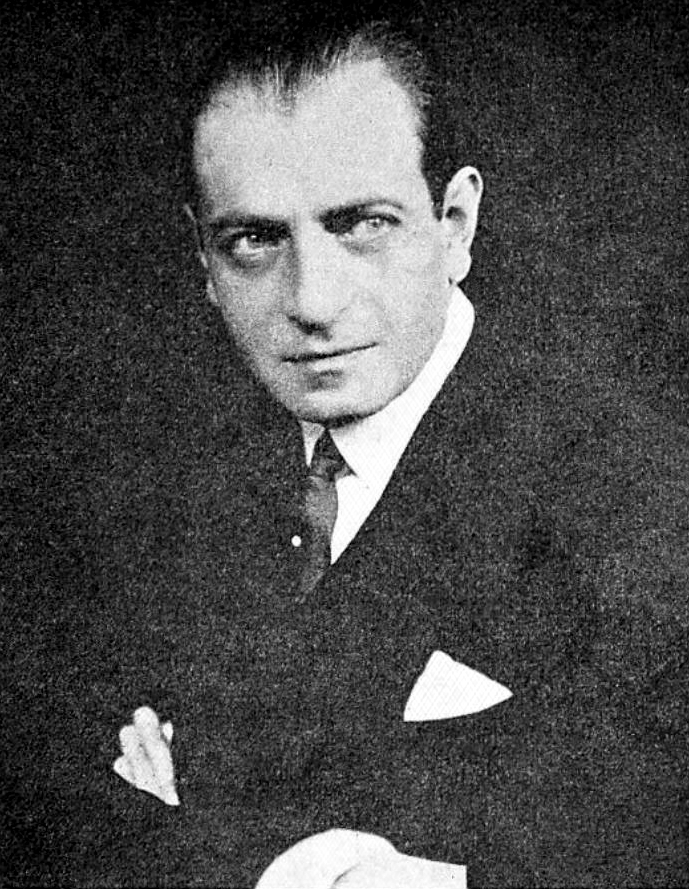
- Born: 9 April 1890; Vienna, Austro-Hungarian Empire
- Died: 3 February 1948 (aged 57); Los Angeles, California, United States
- Occupation: Director
- Years active: (1926-1933)

Arthur Gregor (April 9, 1890 – February 3, 1948) was an Austrian-born American playwright and film director.

== Selected filmography ==
- The Count of Luxembourg (1926)
- Say It with Diamonds (1927)
- Women's Wares (1927)
- Phyllis of the Follies (1928)
- The Scarlet Dove (1928)
- What Price Decency (1933)

== Bibliography ==
- Goble, Alan. The Complete Index to Literary Sources in Film. Walter de Gruyter, 1999.
