= The Scarlet Dove (1928 film) =

1928 silent drama film

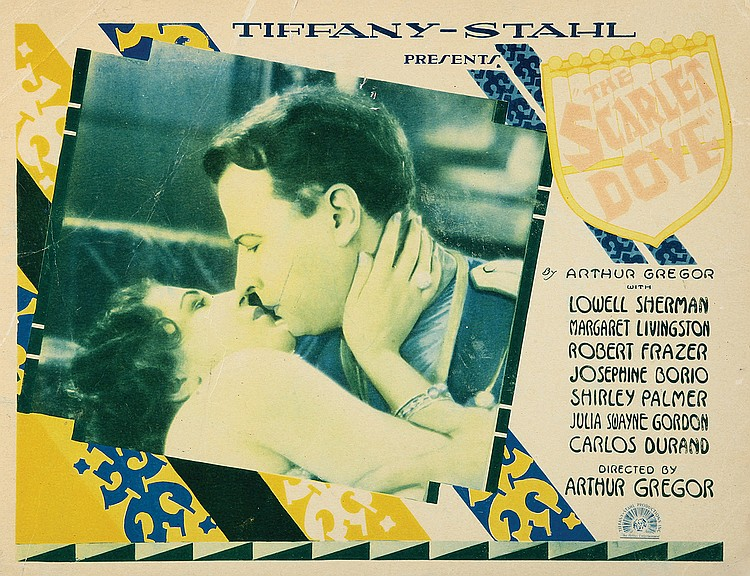
- Lobby card
- Directed by: Arthur Gregor
- Written by: Harry Braxton; Arthur Gregor; Jack Natteford; Viola Brothers Shore
- Produced by: John M. Stahl
- Starring: Lowell Sherman; Robert Frazer; Josephine Borio
- Cinematography: Ernest Miller
- Edited by: Martin G. Cohn
- Production company: Tiffany Pictures
- Distributed by: Tiffany Pictures
- Release date: April 15, 1928
- Running time: 60 minutes
- Country: United States
- Language: Silent (English intertitles)

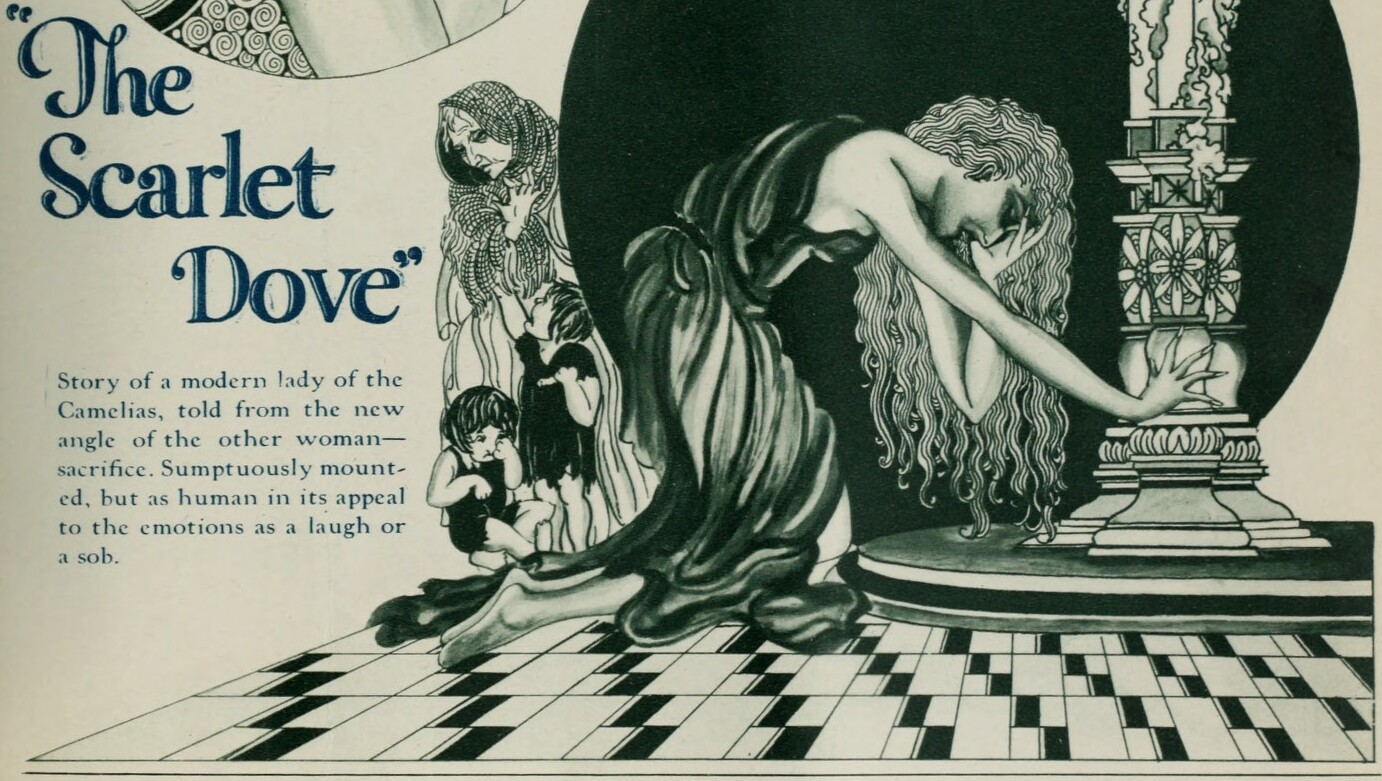
1927 ad

The Scarlet Dove is a 1928 American silent drama film directed by Arthur Gregor and starring Lowell Sherman, Robert Frazer, and Josephine Borio.

== Cast ==
- Lowell Sherman as Ivan Orloff
- Robert Frazer as Alexis Petroff
- Josephine Borio as Mara
- Margaret Livingston as Olga
- Shirley Palmer as Eve
- Carlos Durand as Gregory
- Julia Swayne Gordon as The Aunt

== Preservation ==
A print of The Scarlet Dove is preserved by the BFI National Archive, London.

== Bibliography ==
- Weaver, John T. Twenty Years of Silents, 1908-1928. Scarecrow Press, 1971.
