= Ben Silvey =

American film director

- Born: Benjamin Silberman; May 23, 1894; New York, USA
- Died: February 7, 1948 (aged 53); Hollywood, California, USA
- Occupations: assistant director, producer and Production manager
- Years active: 1924-1948

Ben Silvey (May 23, 1894 – February 7, 1948) was an American assistant director, producer and production manager. He was nominated at the 6th Academy Awards for the short lived Best Assistant Director category.

== Filmography ==
- The Masked Dancer (1924) (assistant director)
- Wedding Rings (1929) (assistant director)
- Song of the Flame (1930) (assistant director)
- Those Who Dance (1930) (assistant director)
- Compromised (1931) (assistant director)
- Advice to the Lovelorn (1933) (assistant director)
- Blood Money (1933)
- The Bowery (1933) (second unit director)
- The King's Vacation (1933) (assistant director)
- Ladies They Talk About (1933) (assistant director)
- The House of Rothschild (1934) (assistant director)
- Kid Millions (1934) (assistant director)
- The Last Gentleman (1934) (assistant director)
- Cardinal Richelieu (1935) (assistant director)
- Clive of India (1935) (assistant director)
- Thanks a Million (1935) (assistant director)
- It Had to Happen (1936) (assistant director)
- One in a Million (1936) (assistant producer)
- Under Two Flags (1936) (unit manager)
- Second Honeymoon (1937) (assistant to the producer)
- Thin Ice (1937) (assistant producer)
- Rebecca of Sunnybrook Farm (1938) (assistant producer)
- Straight Place and Show (1938) (assistant to the producer)
- Three Blind Mice (1938) (assistant to the producer)
- Jesse James (1939) (associate producer)
- Stanley and Livingstone (1939) (assistant producer)
- The Return of Frank James (1940) (production manager)
- Sun Valley Serenade (1941) (production manager)
- Western Union (1941) (unit manager)
- Lifeboat (1944) (production manager)
- The Spider (1945) (assistant producer)
- Within These Walls (1945) (producer)
- The Ghost and Mrs. Muir (1947) (production manager)
- The Snake Pit (1948) (production manager)
