= High Stakes (1931 film) =

1931 film

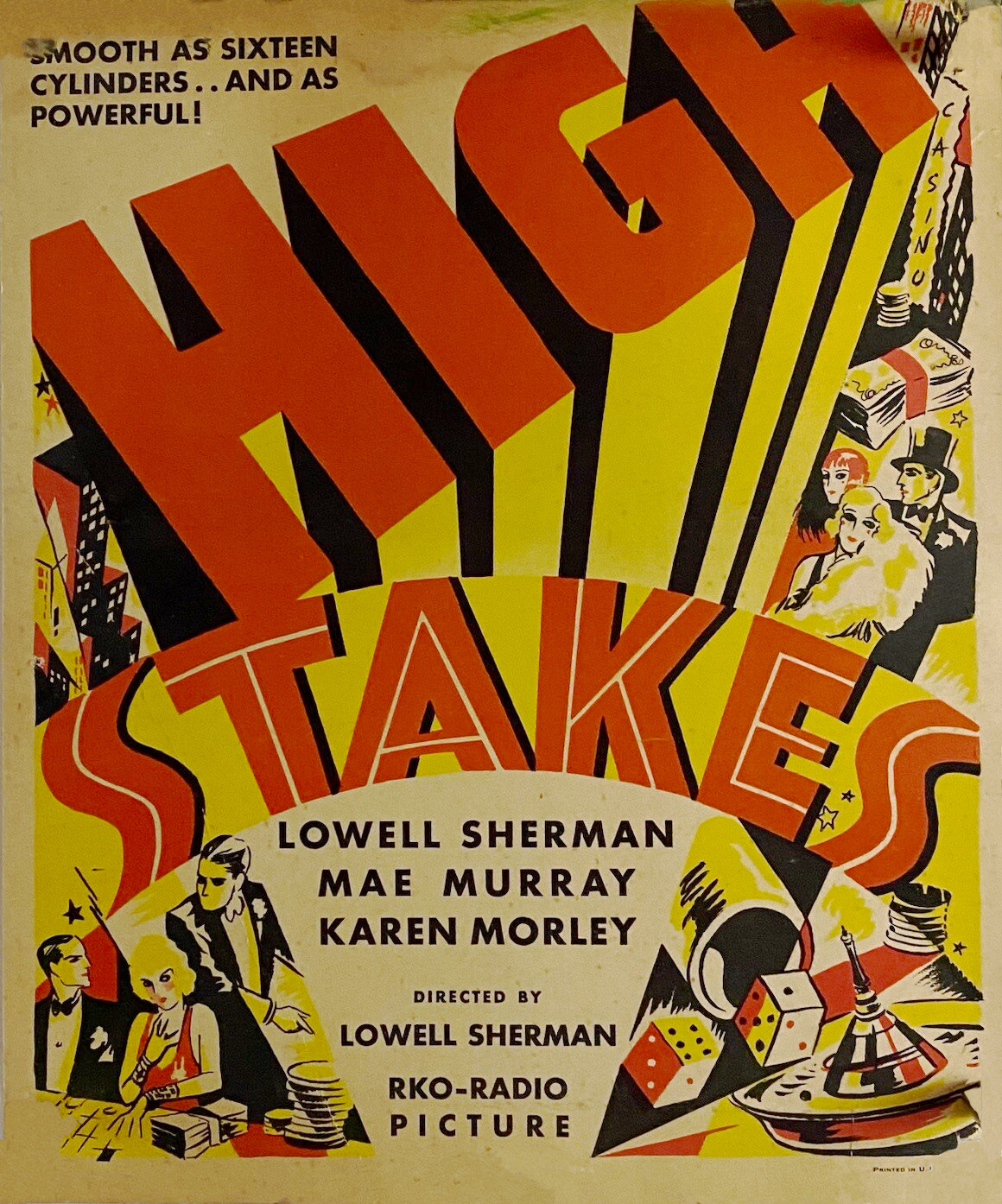
- Theatrical release poster
- Directed by: Lowell Sherman
- Written by: J. Walter Ruben
- Produced by: RKO Pictures
- Starring: Lowell Sherman; Mae Murray; Karen Morley; Edward Martindel
- Cinematography: J. Roy Hunt
- Music by: Max Steiner
- Distributed by: RKO Pictures
- Release date: August 18, 1931
- Running time: 69 minutes
- Country: United States
- Language: English

High Stakes is a 1931 American pre-Code comedy drama produced and released by RKO Pictures. The picture was directed by Lowell Sherman who also stars and marks the last starring screen appearance of silent screen diva Mae Murray. It is based on a 1924 Broadway play that starred Sherman playing the same role he plays in this film.

== Cast ==
- Lowell Sherman - Joe Lennon
- Mae Murray - Dolly Jordan Lennon
- Karen Morley - Anne Cornwall
- Edward Martindel - Richard Lennon
- Leyland Hodgson - Louis Winkler aka Louis DeSalta
- Ethel Levey - Mrs. Leonore Gregory
- Alan Roscoe - Judge Hennessey
- Maude Turner Gordon - Mrs. Hennessey
- Charles Coleman - Murray
- Phillips Smalley - Mr. Gregory
