= Lawful Larceny (1923 film) =

1923 film by Allan Dwan

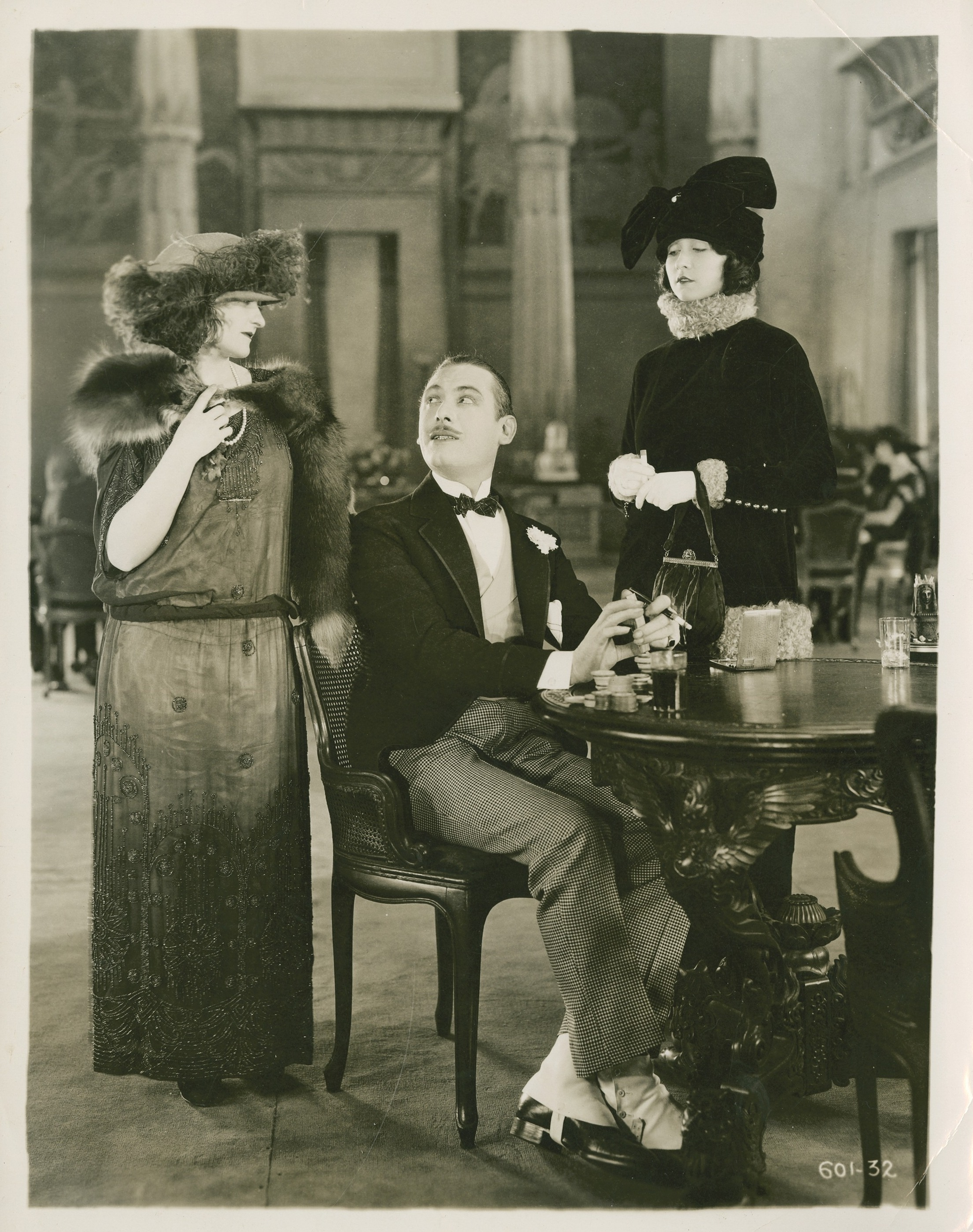
- Publicity photo for the film
- Directed by: Allan Dwan
- Screenplay by: John Lynch; Samuel Shipman
- Based on: Lawful Larceny by Samuel Shipman
- Produced by: Adolph Zukor
- Starring: Hope Hampton; Conrad Nagel; Nita Naldi; Lew Cody; Russell Griffin; Yvonne Hughes
- Cinematography: Harold Rosson
- Production company: Famous Players–Lasky Corporation
- Distributed by: Paramount Pictures
- Release date: July 22, 1923
- Running time: 60 minutes
- Country: United States
- Language: Silent (English intertitles)

Lawful Larceny is a lost 1923 American silent drama film directed by Allan Dwan and written by John Lynch and Samuel Shipman. The film stars Hope Hampton, Conrad Nagel, Nita Naldi, Lew Cody, Russell Griffin, and Yvonne Hughes. The film was released on July 22, 1923, by Paramount Pictures.

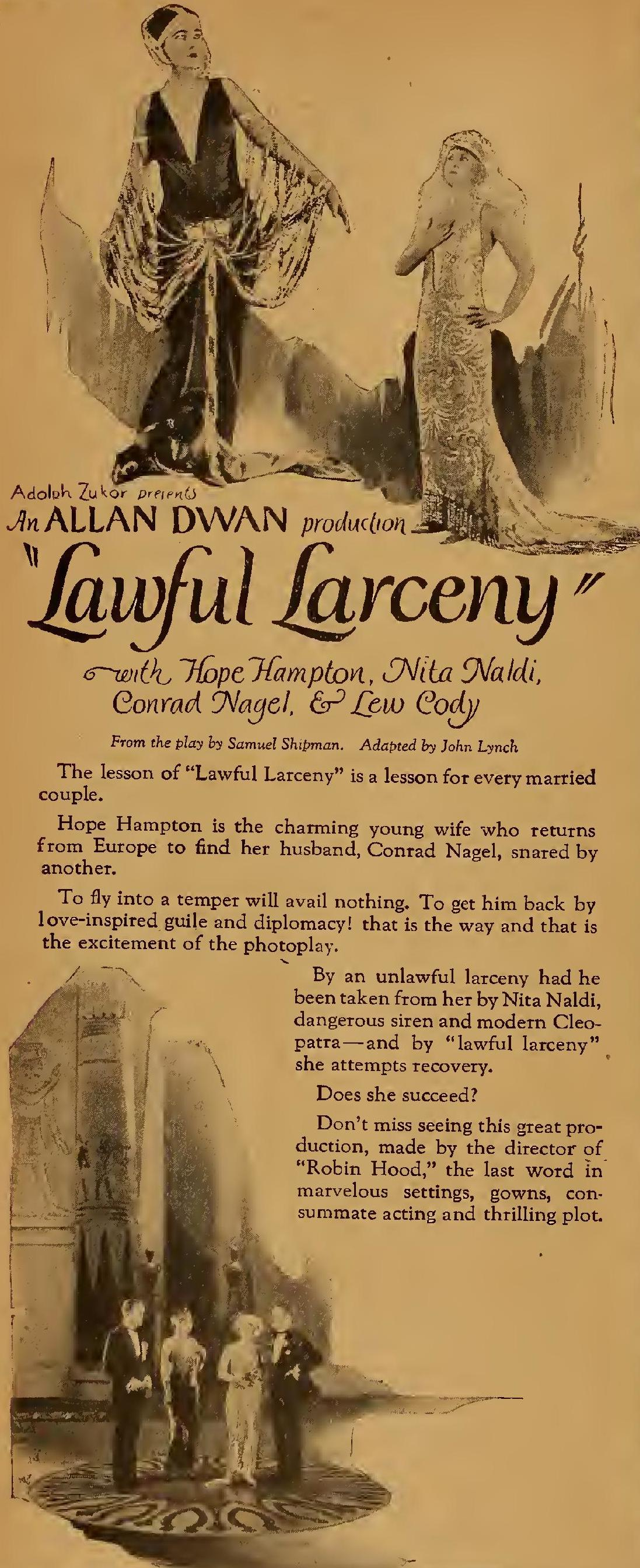
Lawful Larceny ad in Motion Picture Magazine, 1923

The film was remade at RKO Pictures in 1930 as a sound film of the same title with Bebe Daniels in the lead role.

== Plot ==
As described in a film magazine review, Vivian Hepburn, a modern vampire, runs a gambling house with Guy Tarlow, a male partner who directs the victims to the house. She financially ruins Andrew Dorsey while his young wife Marion is in Europe. When she returns she hears all about the woman and is determined to obtain revenge. She goes to the gambling house and succeeds in ensnaring the vampire's partner, and by this means she is able to win back her husband's fortune and regain her own happiness.

== Cast ==
- Hope Hampton as Marion Dorsey
- Conrad Nagel as Andrew Dorsey
- Nita Naldi as Vivian Hepburn
- Lew Cody as Guy Tarlow
- Russell Griffin as Sonny Dorsey
- Yvonne Hughes as Billy Van de Vere
- Dolores Costello as Nora the maid
- Gilda Gray as Dancer
- Florence O'Denishawn as Dancer
- Alice Maison as Dancer
