= Monsieur Beaucaire (1924 film) =

1924 film by Sidney Olcott

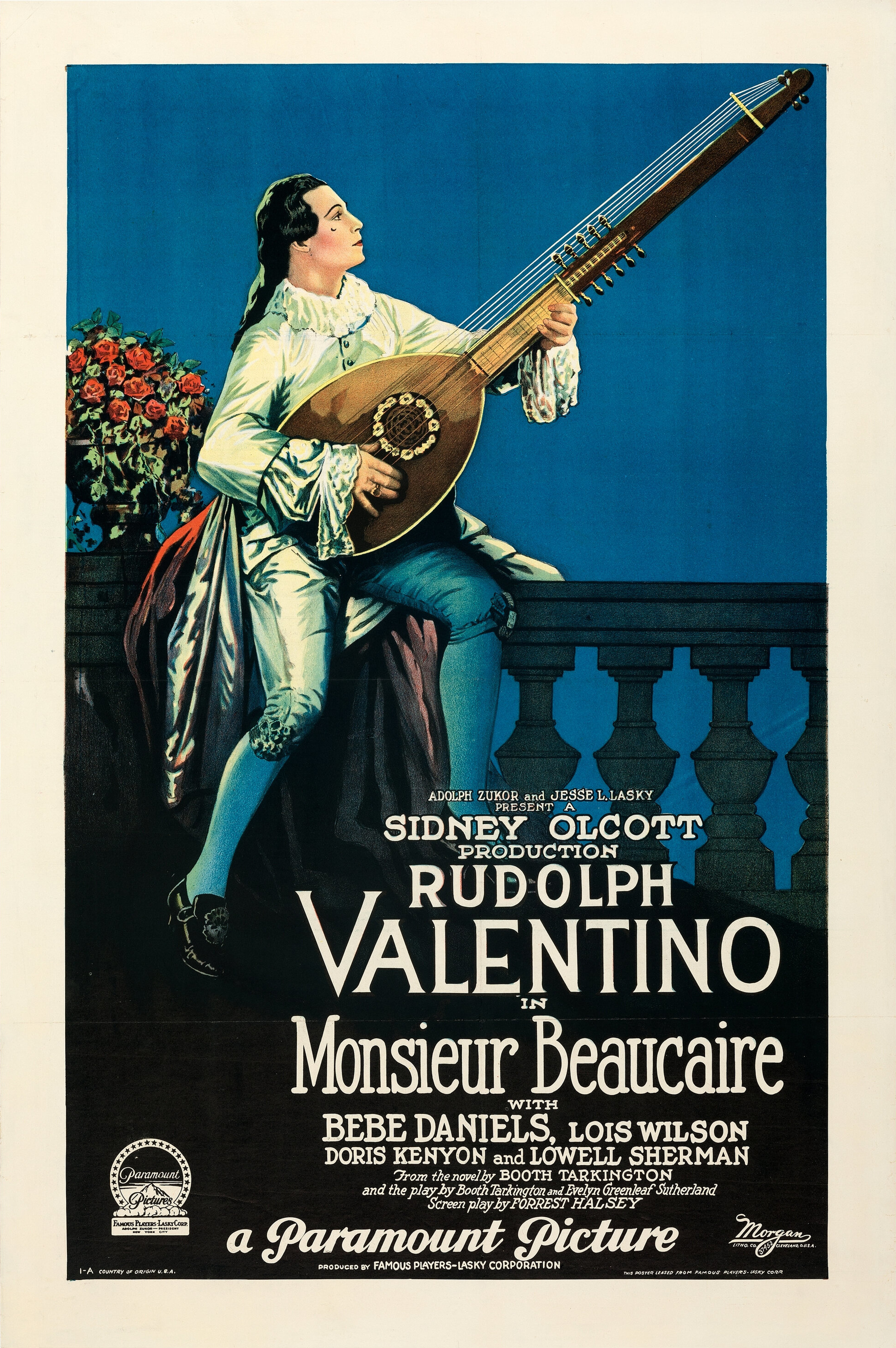
- Directed by: Sidney Olcott
- Screenplay by: Forrest Halsey (Scenario)
- Based on: Monsieur Beaucaire by Booth Tarkington Monsieur Beaucaire by Booth Tarkington and Evelyn Greenleaf Sutherland
- Produced by: Sidney Olcott
- Starring: Rudolph Valentino; Bebe Daniels; Lois Wilson
- Cinematography: Harry Fischbeck
- Edited by: Patricia Rooney
- Production company: Famous Players–Lasky
- Distributed by: Paramount Pictures
- Release date: August 11, 1924
- Running time: 106 minutes
- Country: United States
- Language: Silent (English intertitles)
- Box office: $3.5 million (U.S. and Canada rentals)

Monsieur Beaucaire (full film)

Monsieur Beaucaire is a 1924 American silent romantic historical drama film starring Rudolph Valentino in the title role, Bebe Daniels, and Lois Wilson. Produced and directed by Sidney Olcott, the film is based on Booth Tarkington's 1900 novel of the same name and the 1904 play of the same name by Tarkington and Evelyn Greenleaf Sutherland.

== Plot ==
The Duke of Chartres is in love with Princess Henriette, but she seemingly wants nothing to do with him. Eventually he grows tired of her insults and flees to England when Louis XV insists that the two marry. He goes undercover as Monsieur Beaucaire, the barber of the French Ambassador, and finds that he enjoys the freedom of a commoner’s life. After catching the Duke of Winterset cheating at cards, he forces him to introduce him as a nobleman to Lady Mary, with whom he has become infatuated. When Lady Mary is led to believe that the Duke of Chartres is merely a barber she loses interest in him. She eventually learns that he is a nobleman after all and tries to win him back, but the Duke of Chartres opts to return to France and Princess Henriette who now returns his affection.

== Cast ==
- Rudolph Valentino as Duke de Chartres / Beaucaire
- Bebe Daniels as Princess Henriette
- Lois Wilson as Queen Marie of France
- Doris Kenyon as Lady Mary
- Lowell Sherman as King Louis XV of France
- Paulette Duval as Madame de Pompadour
- John Davidson as Richelieu
- Oswald Yorke as Miropoix
- Flora Finch as Duchess of Montmorency
- Louis Waller as François
- Ian MacLaren as Duke of Winterset
- Frank Shannon as Badger
- Templar Powell as Molyneux
- H. Cooper Cliffe as Beau Nash
- Downing Clarke as Lord Chesterfield
- Yvonne Hughes as Duchess of Flauhaut
- Harry Lee as Voltaire
- Florence O'Denishawn as Colombine
- Blanche Craig as Ball Guest at Bath
- Nat Pendleton as Barber

== Production notes ==
Monsieur Beaucaire was produced by Famous Players–Lasky, directed by Sidney Olcott, and distributed by Paramount Pictures. It was filmed at Kaufman Astoria Studios in New York City.

For this film, whose action is set at the court of King Louis XV, the atmosphere is resolutely French and French-speaking. It is French dancer Paulette Duval's second American picture; the Belgian André Daven, playing the brother of Valentino's character, was hired for his resemblance to the Latin lover; the Nantes-based Georges Barbier designed the 350 costumes. The film's dialogues were written in French for more realism. Valentino speaks French, as do Bebe Daniels, Lowell Sherman and Sidney Olcott.

== Reception ==
Monsieur Beaucaire was part of a series of box office and critical disappointments that plagued Valentino mid-career. Although the film did fairly well in big cities, it flopped in smaller locales, and could not exceed the expensive budget Olcott put into the film's production. Historians Kevin Brownlow and John Kobal suggested that the film's shortcomings stemmed more from Olcott's "pedestrian" direction.

Much of the blame for the film's alleged shortcomings was assigned to Valentino's wife Natacha Rambova who was felt by many of Valentino's colleagues to have had an undue influence on the costumes, set and direction of the film. Alicia Annas wrote that audiences were most likely alienated by the general design of the film which, while historically accurate, was not tailored to 1920s American filmgoers' tastes. The Stan Laurel parody Monsieur Don't Care (1924) reflected the general public attitude toward Monsieur Beaucaire.

== Adaptations ==
The novel Monsieur Beaucaire was adapted into a musical film, Monte Carlo (1930), directed by Ernst Lubitsch. The story was filmed again as a comedy, directed by George Marshall and starring Bob Hope and Joan Caulfield, also called Monsieur Beaucaire (1946).

The 1951 biopic Valentino, produced by Columbia Pictures, directed by Lewis Allen with Anthony Dexter, includes a sequence dedicated to Monsieur Beaucaire.

A long sequence dedicated to Monsieur Beaucaire appears in the 1977 film Valentino, directed by Ken Russell, with Rudolf Nureyev in the title role and John Justin in the role of Sidney Olcott.
