= Margaret Lawrence (actress) =

American actress (1889–1929)

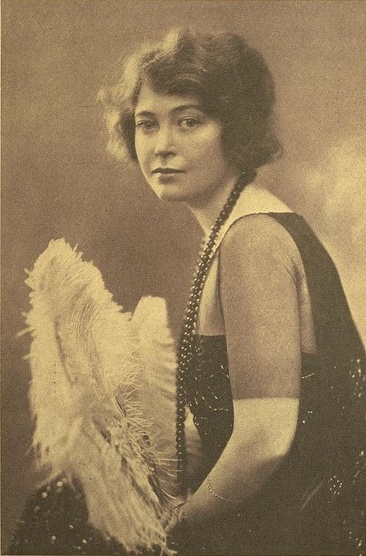
- Lawrence, c. 1920
- Born: Margaret Whittaker Lawrence; August 2, 1889; Philadelphia, Pennsylvania, U.S.
- Died: June 9, 1929 (aged 39); New York City, U.S.
- Resting place: Ivy Hill Cemetery, Philadelphia
- Occupation: Actress
- Years active: 1910–1929
- Spouse(s): Orson D. Munn; Wallace Eddinger
- Children: 2

Margaret Whittaker Lawrence (August 2, 1889 – June 9, 1929) was an American stage actress known for her performances on Broadway and other venues.

Born in Philadelphia to Mr and Mrs. George Lawrence, Margaret Lawrence began her career in Chicago in 1910, appeared in New York in Over Night (1911) and starred in such Broadway plays as Wedding Bells (1919), Lawful Larceny (1922) and Secrets (1922), the latter of which she was also costume designer. She was socially prominent, serving on the advisory boards of several charitable organizations. She collected old plays, reportedly one of the most complete collections of its kind in New York City.

In 1911 she married Orson D. Munn, publisher of Scientific American, with whom she had two daughters. They divorced in 1922, and in 1924 she married actor Wallace Eddinger. Eddinger died in 1929, and on June 9 of that year, Margaret was shot dead by actor Louis Bennison in a murder-suicide.

She was buried in Philadelphia's Ivy Hill Cemetery.
