= Lawful Larceny (play) =

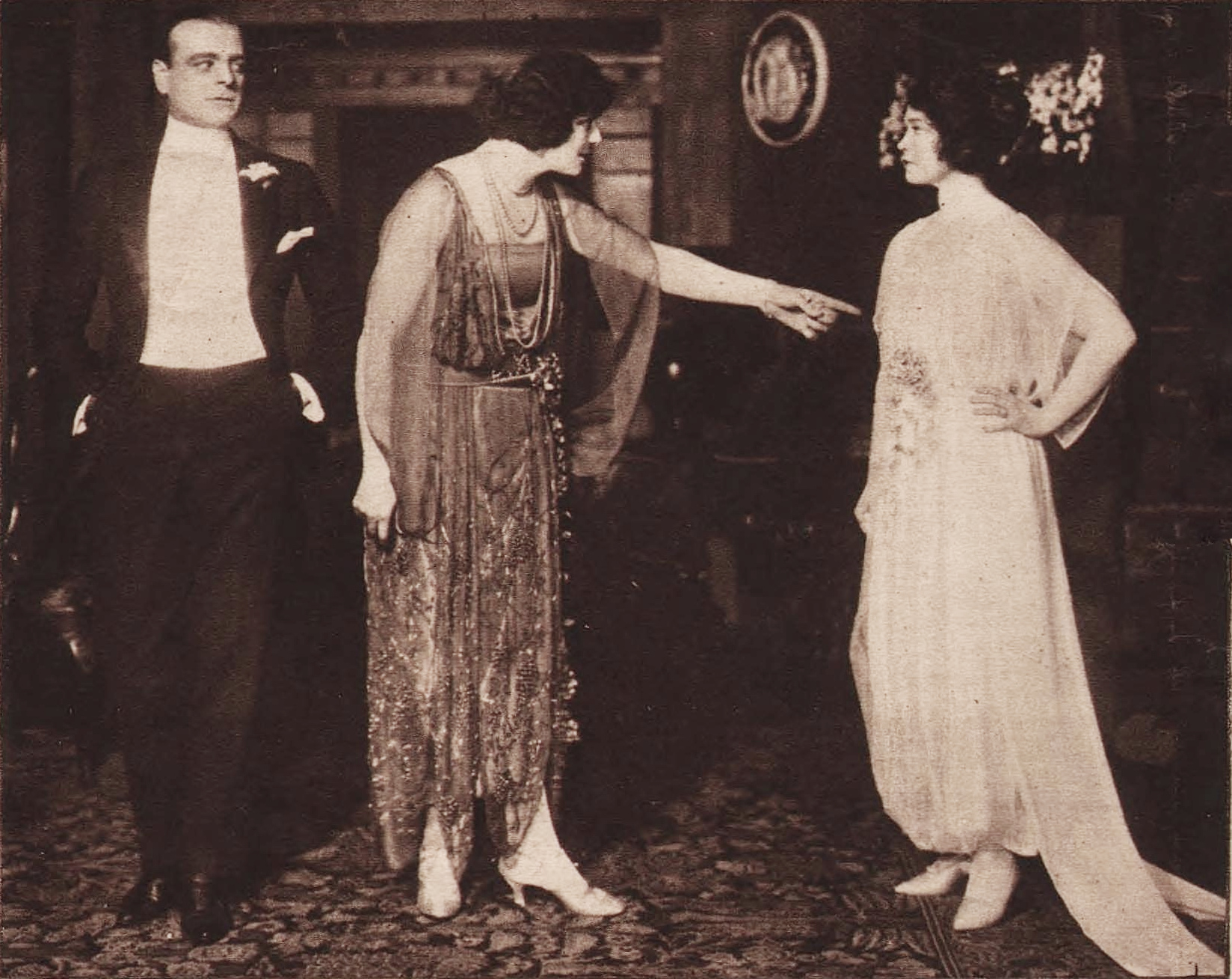
Lowell Sherman, Gail Kane, and Margaret Lawrence in the original Broadway production

Lawful Larceny is a play by Samuel Shipman. It was adapted into the 1923 silent film and 1930 sound film of the same name.

== History ==
Lawful Larceny opened on Broadway at the Theatre Republic on January 2, 1922. It ran there for a total of 190 performances; closing on July 15, 1922. Produced by A. H. Woods and directed by Bertram Harrison, the cast included Margaret Lawrence as Marion Dorsey, Alan Dinehart as Andrew Dorsey, Felix Krembs as Judge Perry, Gail Kane as Vivian Hepburn, John Sharkey as Detective Farrel, Lowell Sherman as Guy Tarlow, Ida Waterman as Mrs. French, John Stokes as Mr. French, Frazer Coulter as Mr. Davis, Martha Mayo as Mrs. Davis, Bijoute La Violette as Celeste, and Sara Haden as Nora.

The London premiere was given in the West End at the Savoy Theatre where it opened on August 22, 1926. It ran for 46 performances with a cast led by Ruth Shepley as Marion.
