= Evelyn Greenleaf Sutherland =

American journalist, author, playwright

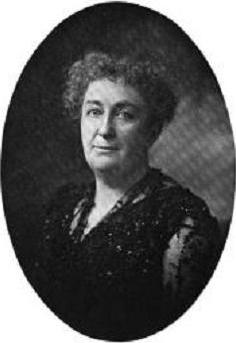
- Born: Evelyn Greenleaf Baker; September 15, 1855; Cambridge, Massachusetts, U.S.
- Died: December 24, 1908 (aged 53); Boston, Massachusetts, U.S
- Occupations: Journalist, author, playwright
- Spouse: John Preston Sutherland (m. 1879–1908)
- Writing career
- Pen name: Dorothy Lundt
- Years active: 1873–1908

Evelyn Greenleaf Sutherland (September 15, 1855 – December 24, 1908) was an American journalist, author and playwright.

== Early life ==
A sixth-generation Bostonian, Sutherland was born on September 15, 1855, in Cambridge, Massachusetts to James and Rachael Arnold Greenleaf Baker. James Baker was a successful wholesale merchant who was active in the pre-Civil War anti-slavery movement and a close friend of Frederick Parker. Sutherland began her education at age three, around the time of her father's death, attending private schools in Boston and later Geneva, Switzerland. While still in her teens she began submitting works to national publications and was among the first to be awarded a prize from the fledgling St. Nicholas Magazine, for her essay "What is a Gentleman?". On March 10, 1879, she married John Preston Sutherland, a young Boston area doctor whom she had known since childhood.

== Career ==
Sutherland worked for over a decade as an editorial writer and drama critic for several Boston newspapers before she began publishing (as Dorothy Lundt) a series of one-act plays, of which Po' White Trash and Other One Act Plays, produced in 1899, was probably her best known. Sutherland's early works were often sketches about the struggles of class and race in America. Sutherland collaborated with General Charles King on the military play Ft. Frayne and with Booth Tarkington on Monsieur Beaucaire. Her four-act romantic comedy "Joan o' the Shoals", set in 1681 New Hampshire, was produced on Broadway in 1903. Over the last decade or so of her life, Sutherland would write a number of plays with her close friend Beulah Marie Dix. Their most successful play, The Road to Yesterday, written in 1906, became the genesis for Victor Herbert's 1924 operetta The Dream Girl. Sutherland continued to contribute short stories and poetry to national magazines throughout her career and in 1894 was awarded first prize in a short story competition sponsored by McClure’s for her army tale, "Dikkon's Dog".

== Death ==
Sutherland died at her Boston home on December 24, 1908, from burns she suffered when her gown brushed up against a gas stove and caught fire.
