= Monsieur Beaucaire (1946 film) =

1946 film by George Marshall

- Directed by: George Marshall
- Written by: Melvin Frank; Norman Panama; Frank Tashlin
- Based on: Monsieur Beaucaire by Booth Tarkington
- Produced by: Paul Jones
- Starring: Bob Hope; Joan Caulfield; Patric Knowles
- Cinematography: Lionel Lindon
- Edited by: Arthur P. Schmidt
- Music by: Robert Emmett Dolan
- Production company: Paramount Pictures
- Distributed by: Paramount Pictures
- Release date: September 4, 1946
- Running time: 93 minutes
- Country: United States
- Language: English
- Box office: $3.5 million (US rentals)

Monsieur Beaucaire is a 1946 American historical comedy film directed by George Marshall and starring Bob Hope, Joan Caulfield and Patric Knowles. Hope portrays the title character, the barber of King Louis XV. It is loosely based on the novel of the same name by Booth Tarkington. It is a remake of the 1924 Rudolph Valentino silent film of the same name Monsieur Beaucaire.

== Plot ==
King Louis XV of France is invited by his rival King Philip V of Spain to choose a suitable husband for Philip's daughter, Princess Maria, as a gesture of unity between their two nations. Louis's choice is the Duc le Chandre, but the duke fancies Madame Pompadour, as does the king.

Louis' bumbling barber, Beaucaire, becomes tangled in a web of deceit along with Mimi, a chambermaid he loves. Both end up exiled from France, and after Beaucaire assists the duke in hiding Madame Pompadour, all must ward off General Don Francisco who is planning to overthrow Philip so that he can rule Spain.

After a series of mistakes and misadventures, Beaucaire shows his bravery in a sword fight with Don Francisco, and is rewarded by the duke coming to his rescue. Beaucaire and Mimi emigrate safely to the American Colonies, where Mimi gives birth to a baby that has Bob Hope's adult face.

== Cast ==
- Bob Hope as Monsieur Beaucaire
- Joan Caulfield as Mimi
- Patric Knowles as Duc le Chandre
- Marjorie Reynolds as Princess Maria of Spain
- Cecil Kellaway as Count D'Armand
- Joseph Schildkraut as Don Francisco
- Reginald Owen as King Louis XV
- Constance Collier as Marie Leszczyńska, The Queen of France
- Hillary Brooke as Madame de Pompadour
- Fortunio Bonanova as Don Carlos
- Douglass Dumbrille as George Washington
- Mary Nash as The Duenna
- Leonid Kinskey as Rene
- Howard Freeman as King Philip V
- Lewis Russell as Chief Justice
- Brandon Hurst as Marquis (uncredited)

== Bibliography ==
- Zoglin, Richard. Hope: Entertainer of the Century. Simon and Schuster, 2014.
