= Wallace Eddinger =

American actor

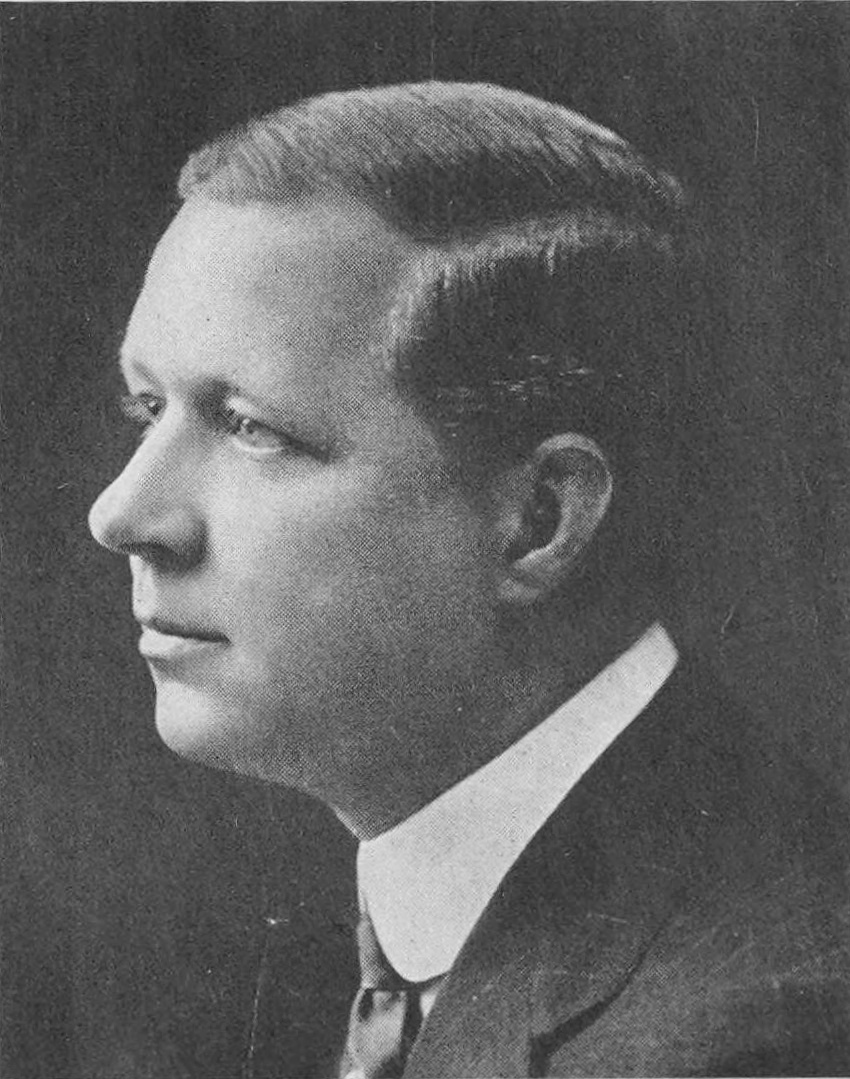
- Eddinger c. 1917
- Born: July 14, 1881/or 1883; Albany, New York
- Died: January 8, 1929 (aged 47); Pittsburgh, Pennsylvania
- Resting place: Amityville Cemetery, Suffolk County New York
- Occupation: Actor
- Years active: 1888-1928
- Spouse(s): Ivy Lee Callender; Margaret Lawrence

Wallace Eddinger (July 14, 1881/1883 – January 8, 1929) was an American stage actor. He started as a child actor, known as Wally Eddinger. As a child he played Cedric in Little Lord Fauntleroy which starred female child sensation Elsie Leslie.

Eddinger appeared in only two silent films, The Great Diamond Robbery and A Gentleman of Leisure, in 1914 and 1915 respectively, preferring the stage. The latter film still survives.

Eddinger was born to actors Lawrence Eddinger (1855-1928) and May (née Williams) (1858-1944) and had an older sister Lorle Eddinger (1879-1969). He was married twice, first to Ivy Lee Moore-La Grove from 1912 to 1920, and second to popular stage actress Margaret Lawrence (1889-1929) from 1924 until his death. Lawrence had been previously married to a publisher named Orson Munn, with whom she had two daughters. Six months after Eddinger's death, Margaret Lawrence was murdered in New York City by her lover, actor Louis Bennison, after a drunken lover's quarrel. Bennison then killed himself in what was deemed a murder-suicide.
