= Kathryn Perry =

American actress (1897–1983)

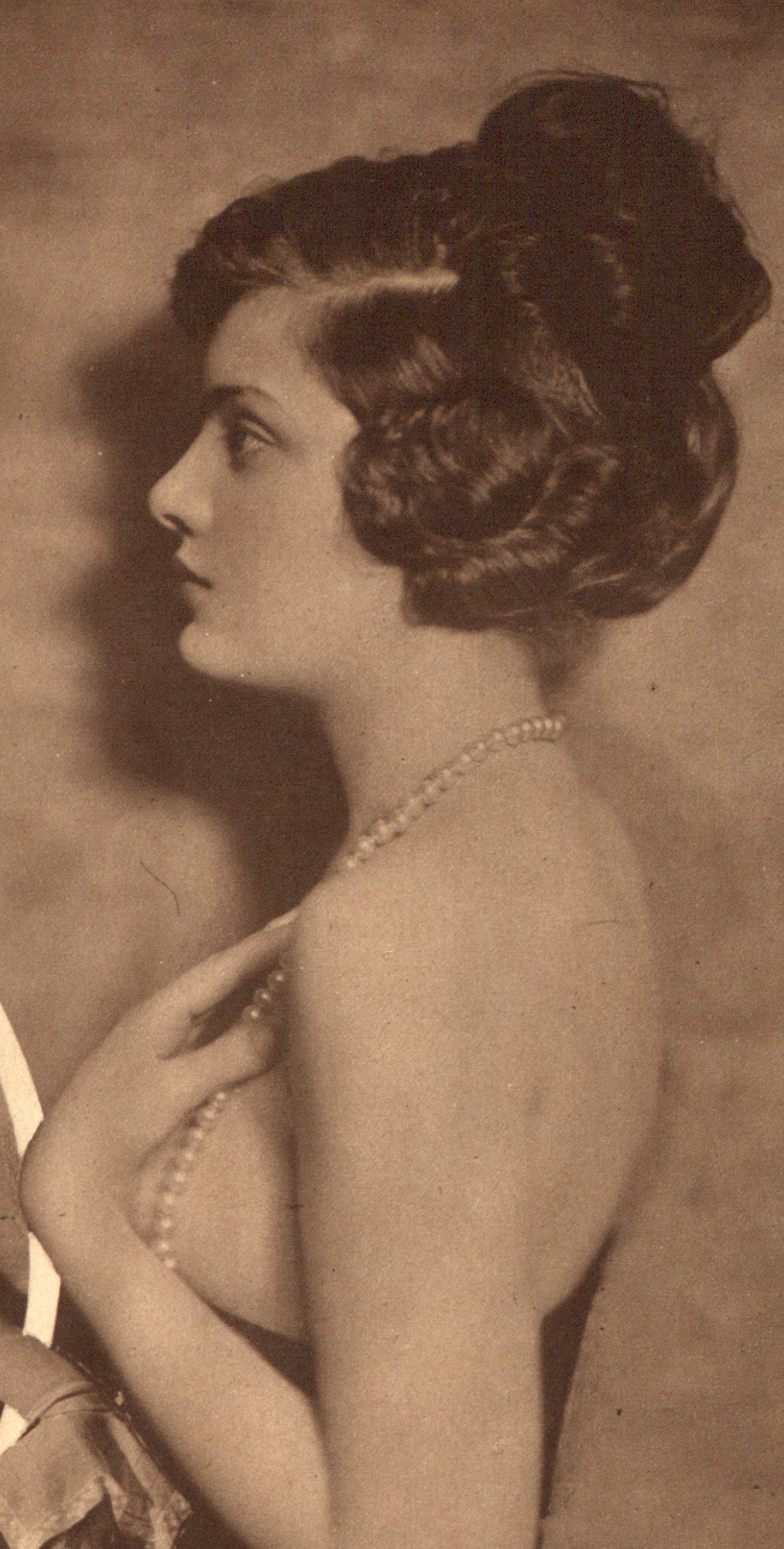
- Perry in 1918
- Born: January 5, 1897; New York City, New York, U.S.
- Died: October 14, 1983 (aged 86); Los Angeles, California, U.S.
- Other names: Katherine Perry
- Occupation: Actress
- Years active: 1911–1936
- Spouse: Owen Moore (m. 1921; died 1939)

Katherine Perry (January 5, 1897 – October 14, 1983), also known as Kathryn Perry, was an American stage and film actress. She appeared in 37 films between 1920 and 1936.

== Biography ==
Katherine Perry was born on January 5, 1897. Although she spent a brief time in a private school, the bulk of Perry's education came in public schools.

Before she became an actress, Perry worked as a model. She was in the Ziegfeld Follies of 1911, 1917, 1918, 1919, and the more risqué Midnight Frolic show in 1918. Apart from the Follies, she also acted on Broadway in (From) Broadway to Paris, which ran from November 1912 to January 1913, The Passing Show of 1913, Robinson Crusoe, Jr. (1916), The Century Girl (1916-1917), and Miss 1917.

She made her film debut in Sooner or Later (1920). She next appeared in minor roles in The Chicken in the Case (1921) and Why Girls Leave Home (1921), in which she was billed as Mrs. Owen Moore. Her first starring role was in Fools and Riches (1923), starring alongside Herbert Rawlinson. Afterwards, she appeared in several short films before starring in Early to Wed (1926) with Matt Moore and Albert Gran and Blood Will Tell (1927).

In the 1930s, she was reduced to acting in uncredited roles. She played Clara Bow's maid in Call Her Savage (1932), and made her final screen appearance in 15 Maiden Lane (1936).

She was the second wife of Owen Moore. They married on July 16, 1921, in Greenwich, Connecticut. The couple acted in the films The Chicken in the Case (1921), A Divorce of Convenience (1921), Reported Missing (1922), Love Is an Awful Thing (1922), Husbands for Rent (1927), and Side Street (1929) together.

== Filmography ==
- Sooner or Later (1920)
- A Divorce of Convenience (1921)
- The Last Door (1921)
- Why Girls Leave Home (1921)
- The Chicken in the Case (1921)
- Reported Missing (1922)
- Love Is an Awful Thing (1922)
- Main Street (1923)
- Womanpower (1923)
- Fools and Riches (1923)
- A Business Engagement (1925)
- All Abroad (1925)
- The Peacemakers (1925)
- His Own Lawyer (1925)
- Wings of Youth (1925)
- The First Year (1926)
- A Woman of Letters (1926)
- Moving Day (1926)
- Early to Wed (1926)
- Too Many Relations (1926)
- The Family Picnic (1926)
- Easy Payments (1926)
- Womanpower (1926)
- Not to Be Trusted (1926)
- Back to Mother (1926)
- An Old Flame (1927)
- Just a Husband (1927)
- Is Zat So? (1927)
- Blood Will Tell (1927)
- Husbands for Rent (1927)
- Rumors for Rent (1927)
- Her Silent Wow (1927)
- Side Street (1929)
- Air Mail (1932)
- Call Her Savage (1932)
- One Rainy Afternoon (1936)
- My Man Godfrey (1936)
- 15 Maiden Lane (1936)
