= Mary Agnes Moore =

Irish-American silent film actress

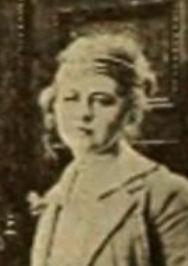
- Mary Moore, from a 1917 publication
- Born: 23 July 1890; County Meath, Ireland
- Died: 3 February 1919 (aged 28); Fère-en-Tardenois, Aisne, France
- Other names: Mary Moore
- Occupation: Actress
- Known for: silent films
- Mother: Rosanna Moore
- Relatives: Joe Moore (actor), Tom Moore (actor), Owen Moore, Matt Moore (actor) (brothers), Mary Pickford (sister-in-law), Grace Cunard (sister-in-law), Renée Adorée (sister-in-law), Alice Joyce (sister-in-law), Katherine Perry (sister-in-law)

Mary Agnes Moore (23 July 1890 – 3 February 1919) was an Irish-born American actress in silent films, part of a family of film actors.

== Early life and education ==
Moore was born in County Meath, Ireland, the daughter of Rosanna Moore. She immigrated to the United States with her brothers and their widowed mother in 1896. Her brothers Tom, Owen, Matt, and Joe were all silent film actors too. Her sisters-in-law were also actors, including Grace Cunard, Alice Joyce, and Mary Pickford during her lifetime.

== Career ==
Moore was an actress in silent films, with roles in Lena Rivers (1914), The Mad Mountaineer (1914),The Adventure at Briarcliff (1915), Prohibition (1915), The Stubbornness of Geraldine (1915), Under Southern Skies (1915), The Meddler (1915), The Great Divide (1915), A Million a Minute (1916), Without a Soul (1916), The Unconventional Girl (1916), Weighed in the Balance (1916), Ignorance (1916), The Warfare of the Flesh (1917), and Miss Deception (1917). She was also a scenario writer for films. She was associated with Francis X. Bushman's production company in 1916, and with Edward Warren's "Transgressor" production company in 1917.

Moore went to France as a volunteer with the American Red Cross during World War I.

== Death ==
Moore died in Tours, France, in February 1919, at the age of 28, from pneumonia during the worldwide influenza pandemic. She was temporarily buried with military honors at Tours. In 1922 her remains were re-interred at the Oise-Aisne American Cemetery and Memorial.
