= Womanpower =

1926 film

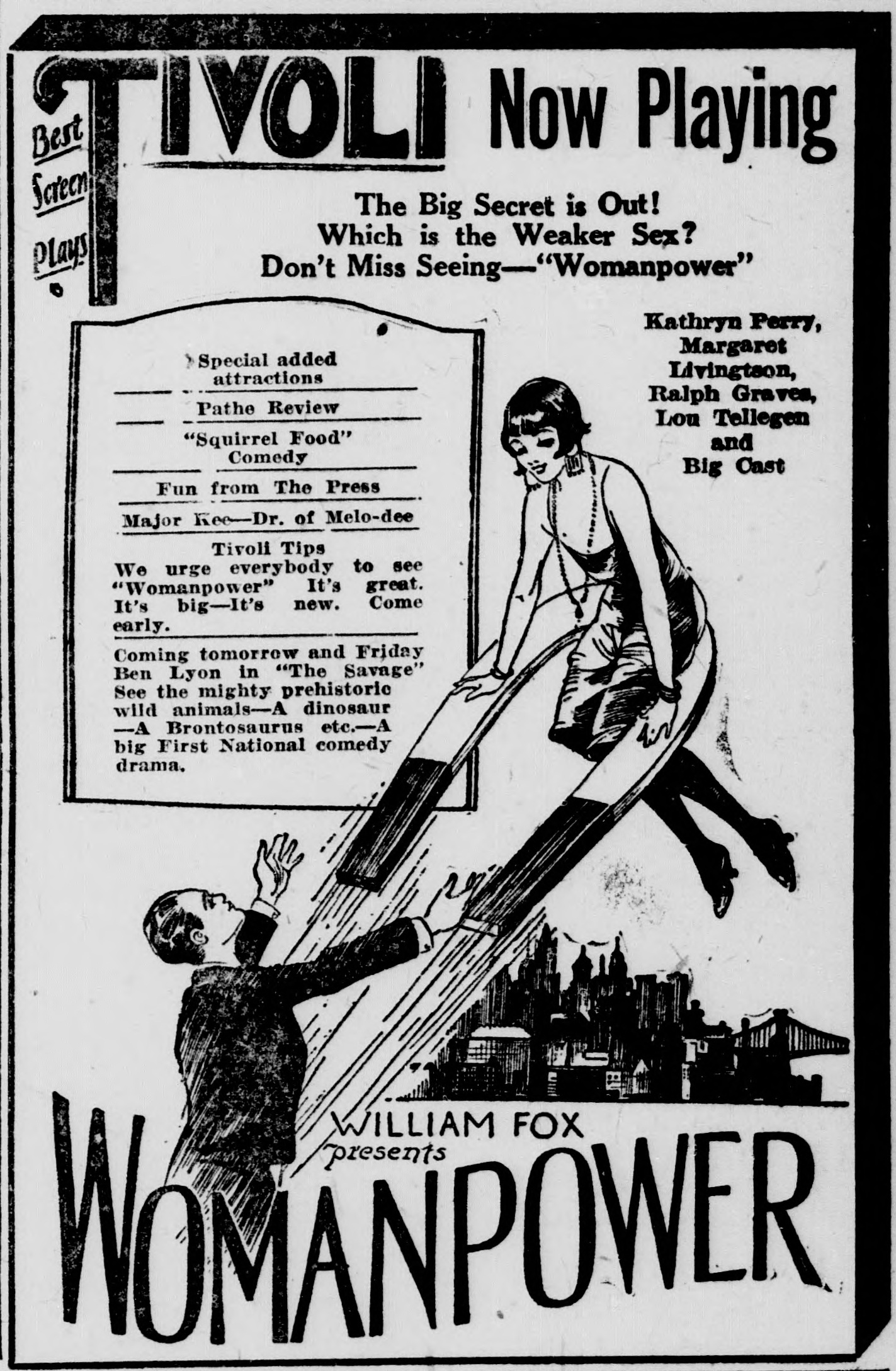
- Contemporary advertisement
- Directed by: Harry Beaumont
- Screenplay by: Kenneth B. Clarke
- Based on: You Can't Always Tell by Harold MacGrath
- Starring: Ralph Graves; Katherine Perry; Margaret Livingston; Ralph Sipperly; Will Walling; David Butler
- Cinematography: Rudolph J. Bergquist
- Production company: Fox Film Corporation
- Distributed by: Fox Film Corporation
- Release date: September 19, 1926
- Running time: 70 minutes
- Country: United States
- Language: English

Womanpower is a 1926 American comedy film directed by Harry Beaumont and written by Kenneth B. Clarke. The film stars Ralph Graves, Katherine Perry, Margaret Livingston, Ralph Sipperly, Will Walling and David Butler. The film was released on September 19, 1926, by Fox Film Corporation. The short story was remade as Right to the Heart (1942).

== Cast ==
- Ralph Graves as Johnny White Bromley
- Katherine Perry as Jenny Killian
- Margaret Livingston as Dot
- Ralph Sipperly as Gimp Conway
- Will Walling as Jake Killian
- David Butler as Mallory
- Lou Tellegen as The Broker
- Anders Randolf as Bromley Sr.
- Robert Ryan as Sands
- Frankie Grandetta as Sheik
