= The First Year =

The First Year may refer to:

- The First Year (play), a 1920 play by Frank Craven
- The First Year (1926 film), a film based on the play
- The First Year (1932 film), a film based on the play
