= The Blue Eagle =

1926 film directed by John Ford

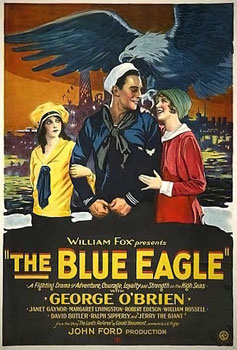
- Theatrical poster to The Blue Eagle (1926)
- Directed by: John Ford (uncredited)
- Written by: Gordon Rigby (scenario); Malcolm Stuart Boylan (titles)
- Based on: "The Lord's Referee" by Gerald Beaumont
- Produced by: John Ford
- Starring: George O'Brien; Janet Gaynor
- Cinematography: George Schneiderman
- Distributed by: Fox Film Corporation
- Release date: September 12, 1926
- Running time: 58 minutes
- Country: United States
- Language: Silent (English intertitles)

The Blue Eagle is a 1926 American action film directed by John Ford.

== Plot ==
George Darcy and Tim Ryan, rival gang leaders, find themselves working on the machinery of a U.S. Navy ship during World War I. For a time, their rivalry over politics and a young woman named Rose is put to rest by shipboard discipline, but the ship's chaplain, Father Joe, finally decides to have them meet in a ring. The fight is interrupted by a submarine attack, but the attack is repelled. After the war, their feud continues until drug dealers kill one of George's brothers and a friend of Tim's. Together, George and Tim attack the dealers' hideout and blow up their submarine. Later, under Father Joe's auspices, a fight is arranged between them, and George emerges victorious.

== Cast ==
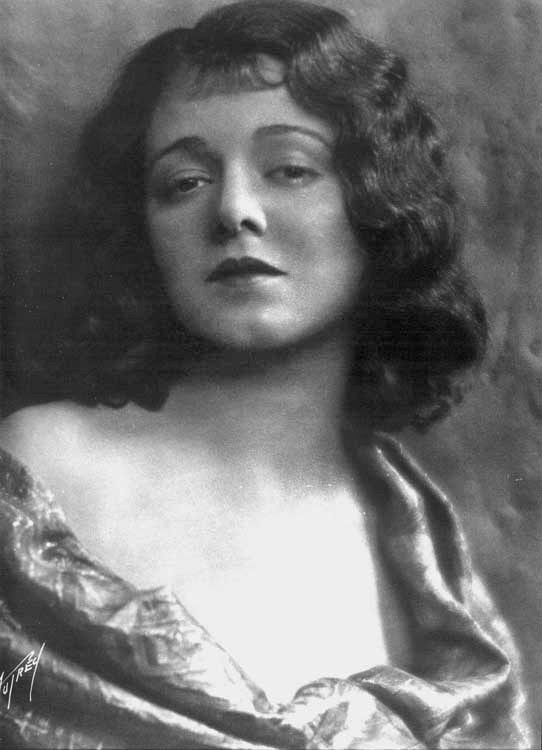
Janet Gaynor in 1927

- George O'Brien as George Darcy
- Janet Gaynor as Rose Kelly
- William Russell as Big Tim Ryan
- Margaret Livingston as Mrs. Mary Rohan
- Robert Edeson as Chaplain Regan, aka Father Joe
- Philip Ford as Limpy Darcy (as Phillip Ford)
- David Butler as Nick 'Dizzy' Galvani
- Lew Short as Sergeant Kelly
- Ralph Sipperly as Slats "Dip" Mulligan
- Jerry Madden as Baby Tom
- Jack Herrick as "On Da Nose" Sailor (uncredited)
- Jack Pennick as Ship's crewman (uncredited)
- Charles Sullivan as Sailor Giving George Boxing Gloves (uncredited)
- Harry Tenbrook as Bascom, a Stoker (uncredited)

== Preservation ==
Prints of The Blue Eagle are in the Library of Congress film archive and in the UCLA Film & Television Archive, but one reel is missing.
