= The Canyon of Light =

1926 film

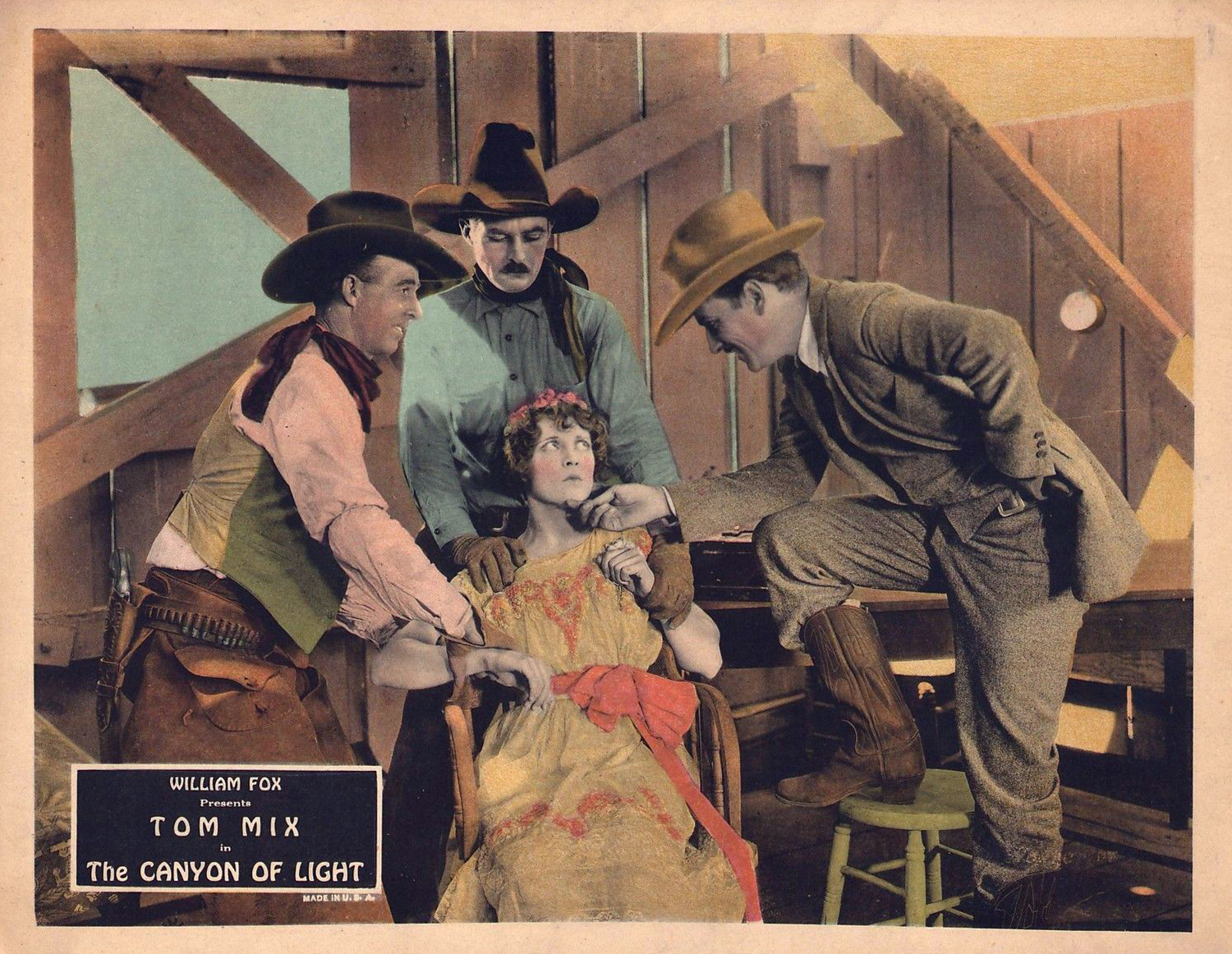
- Lobby card
- Directed by: Benjamin Stoloff
- Screenplay by: John Stone; William Conselman
- Based on: "The Cañon of Light" by Kenneth Perkins
- Starring: Tom Mix; Dorothy Dwan; Barry Norton; Ralph Sipperly; Will Walling; Carmelita Geraghty
- Cinematography: Daniel B. Clark
- Production company: Fox Film Corporation
- Distributed by: Fox Film Corporation
- Release date: December 5, 1926
- Running time: 60 minutes
- Country: United States
- Languages: Silent; English intertitles

The Canyon of Light is a 1926 American silent Western film directed by Benjamin Stoloff and written by John Stone and William Conselman. It is based on the story "The Cañon of Light" by Kenneth Perkins published in Argosy, March 6-April 3, 1926. The film stars Tom Mix, Dorothy Dwan, Barry Norton, Ralph Sipperly, Will Walling and Carmelita Geraghty. The film was released on December 5, 1926, by Fox Film Corporation.

== Plot ==
During World War I, Ricardo Deane is killed fighting for the American Expeditionary Forces on the Western Front. After the war, Deane's family invites his friend Tom Mills to their ranch on the Mexico–United States border. However, Mills discovers that Deane's brother-in-law Ed Bardin is working as a bandit and disguising himself as Mills. After the gang is apprehended, Mills and Ricardo's widow Concha fall in love.

== Cast ==
- Tom Mix as Tom Mills
- Dorothy Dwan as Concha Deane
- Barry Norton as Ricardo Deane
- Ralph Sipperly as Jerry Shanks
- Will Walling as Cyrus Dean
- Carmelita Geraghty as Ellen Bardin
- Carl Miller as Ed Bardin
- Duke R. Lee as Joe Navardo
- Tony the Horse as Tony

== Preservation ==
With no holdings located in archives, The Canyon of Light is considered a lost film.
