= Six Cylinder Love =

Six Cylinder Love may refer to:

- Six Cylinder Love (1923 film), an American silent comedy film
- Six Cylinder Love (1931 film), an American pre-Code comedy film
