= Love Is an Awful Thing =

1922 film

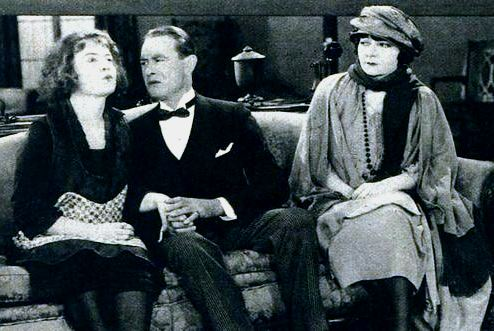
- Film still
- Directed by: Victor Heerman
- Written by: Victor Heerman
- Produced by: Lewis J. Selznick
- Starring: Owen Moore; Marjorie Daw; Katherine Perry
- Cinematography: Jules Cronjager
- Production company: Selznick Pictures
- Distributed by: Selznick Pictures
- Release date: August 30, 1922
- Running time: 70 minutes
- Country: United States
- Language: Silent (English intertitles)

Love Is an Awful Thing is a 1922 American silent comedy film directed by Victor Heerman and starring Owen Moore, Marjorie Daw, and Katherine Perry.

== Plot ==
As described in a film magazine review, Anthony Churchill is to marry Helen after six months probation to convince her father Judge Griggs that he is a proper young man when Marion turns up some of Anthony's old love letters. To put her off, Anthony assumes the role of a married man with six children, but Marion discovers the hoax. Helen runs into a scene with Anthony with his made-up family. Complications ensue and it appears that the marriage will be wrecked when it is discovered that Marion is married to her attorney and the two were involved in hatching a blackmail scheme. This discovery proves removes all difficulties and paves the way to a happy, wedded ending.

== Cast ==
- Owen Moore as Anthony Churchill
- Tom Guise as Judge Griggs
- Marjorie Daw as Helen Griggs
- Katherine Perry as Ruth Allen
- Arthur Hoyt as Harold Wright
- Douglas Carter as Porter
- Charlotte Mineau as Marion
- Snitz Edwards as Superintendent
- Alice Howell as Superintendent's wife
- Maxine Tabnac as Child (uncredited)
- Walter Wilkinson as Child (uncredited)

== Preservation ==
With no holdings located in archives, Love is an Awful Thing is considered a lost film.

== Bibliography ==
- Munden, Kenneth White. The American Film Institute Catalog of Motion Pictures Produced in the United States, Part 1. University of California Press, 1997.
