= No Babies Wanted =

1928 film

No Babies Wanted (aka The Baby Mother)
- Directed by: Jack Harvey
- Written by: Harry Chandlee (intertitles); H. T. Crist; Harriet Hinsdale
- Produced by: Plaza Pictures
- Starring: Priscilla Moran; William V. Mong
- Cinematography: L. William O'Connell
- Edited by: Harry Chandlee
- Distributed by: Irwin Exchanges
- Release date: June 7, 1928
- Running time: 6 reels
- Country: United States
- Language: Silent (English intertitles)

No Babies Wanted is a 1928 silent film domestic drama directed by Jack Harvey, released under the alternative title The Baby Mother. It starred child actress Priscilla Moran (b. 1917) and seasoned silent veteran William V. Mong as her grandfather. It is preserved at the Library of Congress.

== Cast ==
- Priscilla Moran - Patsy O'Day
- William V. Mong - Michael O'Day
- Dorothy Devore - Martha Whitney
- Emily Fitzroy - Landlady, 'Old Ironsides'
- Cissy Fitzgerald - Woman from Orphanage
- John Richard Butler - The Baby

== Plot ==
Michael O'Day, an elderly man, and his 8-year-old granddaughter Patsy, adopt an abandoned baby left on their doorstep. When Michael is injured and hospitalized, Patsy struggles to care for the infant while protecting it from a harsh landlady who enforces strict "no babies" rules in the building and the threat of an orphanage.
