= Fools and Riches =

1923 film

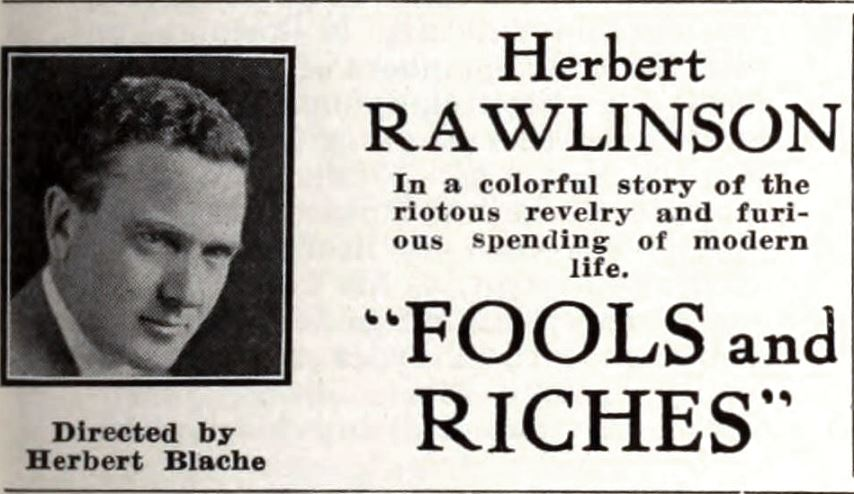
- Advertisement
- Directed by: Herbert Blaché
- Screenplay by: Charles Kenyon; George C. Hull
- Story by: Frederick J. Jackson
- Starring: Herbert Rawlinson; Katherine Perry; Tully Marshall; Doris Pawn; Arthur Stuart Hull; Nick De Ruiz
- Cinematography: Allen M. Davey
- Production company: Universal Pictures
- Distributed by: Universal Pictures
- Release date: May 7, 1923
- Running time: 50 minutes
- Country: United States
- Language: Silent (English intertitles)

Fools and Riches is a 1923 American drama film directed by Herbert Blaché and written by Charles Kenyon and George C. Hull. The film stars Herbert Rawlinson, Katherine Perry, Tully Marshall, Doris Pawn, Arthur Stuart Hull, and Nick De Ruiz. The film was released on May 7, 1923, by Universal Pictures.

== Cast ==
- Herbert Rawlinson as Jimmy Dorgan
- Katherine Perry as Nellie Blye
- Tully Marshall as John Dorgan
- Doris Pawn as Bernice Lorraine
- Arthur Stuart Hull as Dick McCann
- Nick De Ruiz as Frasconi
- Roy Laidlaw as Lawyer
- John Cossar as President of the Railroad
