= Girl of the Port =

1930 film directed by Bert Glennon

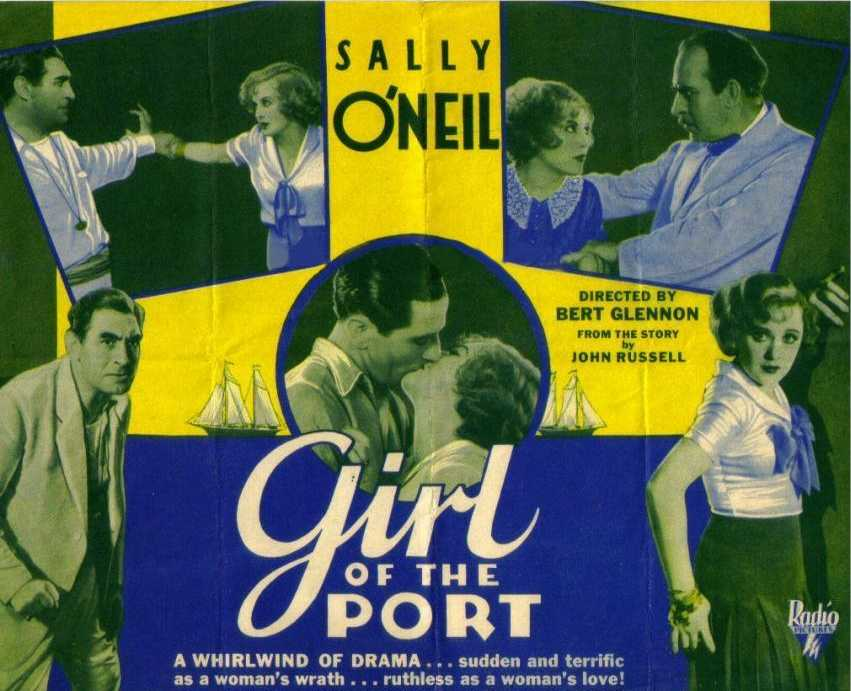
- Theatrical poster for film
- Directed by: Bert Glennon
- Written by: Beulah Marie Dix; Frank Reicher
- Based on: "The Fire-walker"; 1929 story by John Russell
- Produced by: William LeBaron
- Starring: Sally O'Neil; Reginald Sharland; Mitchell Lewis; Duke Kahanamoku
- Cinematography: Leo Tover
- Edited by: Arthur Roberts
- Music by: Roy Webb
- Production company: RKO Radio Pictures
- Distributed by: RKO Radio Pictures
- Release date: February 2, 1930
- Running time: 65 minutes
- Country: United States
- Language: English

Girl of the Port is a 1930 pre-Code melodramatic adventure/romance American film directed by Bert Glennon. The screenplay was written by Beulah Marie Dix and Frank Reicher based on the short story "The Fire-walker" by John Russell. The film stars Sally O'Neil, Reginald Sharland, Mitchell Lewis and Duke Kahanamoku.

== Plot ==
Shot from the film

Jim, a British lord, suffers from a pyrophobia that he developed during the war. Unable to cope with his condition, he flees civilization, coming to rest in the island paradise of Suva in Fiji. As he is attempting to drink himself into forgetfulness, he meets Josie, a showgirl stranded on the island. Josie's friend Kalita convinces the owner of the bar to hire Josie. As Jim and Josie develop a liking for one another, local heavy McEwen becomes jealous.

When McEwen challenges Jim to a fight, Jim demurs, causing those around him to believe that he has a cowardly streak, but Josie continues to believe in him. McEwen intensifies his animosity toward Jim, taunting him into following McEwen to the nearby island of Benga, where McEwen intends to force Jim to participate in the local custom of firewalking. Jim, forced to confront his fear, overcomes it and passes through the fire pit. He then defeats McEwen in a fight and ends up with Josie.

== Cast ==
- Sally O'Neil as Josie
- Reginald Sharland as Jim
- Mitchell Lewis as McEwen
- Duke Kahanamoku as Kalita
- Donald MacKenzie as MacDougal
- Renée Macready as Enid
- Arthur Clayton as Burke
- Gerald Barry as Cruce
- Barrie O'Daniels as Blair
- John Webb Dillon as Cole
- William P. Burt as Toady (credited as William Burt)
- Hugh Crumplin as Wade

== Production ==
John Russell's short story "The Fire-walker" first appeared in his book Far Wandering Men in 1929. RKO purchased the rights to the story and scheduled the film for its 1929-30 production schedule, under the title The Firewalker. RKO began production on the movie in October 1929. In November, it was revealed that Sally O'Neil would appear in the film, and later that month, Frank Reicher was loaned to RKO from its subsidiary studio Pathé Exchange to write additional dialog for the screenplay. On November 20, Variety reported that Donald McKenzie, Arthur Clayton, Gerald Barry and Leyland Hodgson had been assigned to the cast, although Hodgson's appearance in the film is not confirmed by other industry sources.

Filming was completed in December 1929. In early 1930, RKO announced that it would change the film's title to Girl of the Port and that it would also release a silent version of the film.

== Reception ==
In an article in Close Up magazine, Girl of the Port, along with several other American films, was lauded as an example of the "new humanitarianism." Motion Picture Magazine's review called the film "just another melo[drama]" although it did offer praise for Sally O'Neil, calling her acting effort "heroic". Motion Picture News reviewed the film favorably while noting that it was inappropriate for children. The review panned O'Neil's performance and Beulah Marie Dix's screenplay but complimented Reginald Sharland, Mitchell Lewis and Bert Glennon.
