= The Great Divide (1915 film) =

1915 silent film drama directed by Edgar Lewis

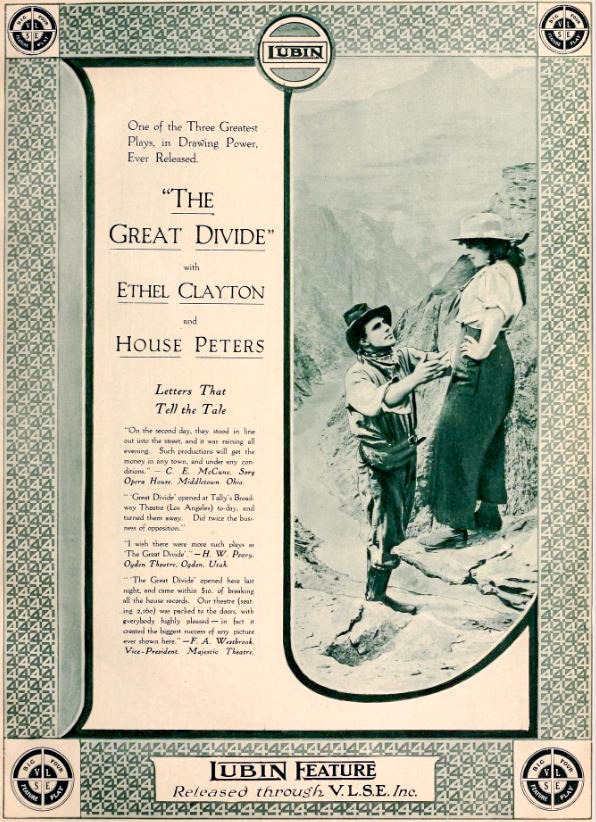
- Advertisement
- Directed by: Edgar Lewis
- Written by: Anthony Paul Kelly (scenario)
- Based on: The Great Divide; 1906 play by William Vaughn Moody
- Produced by: Siegmund Lubin
- Starring: Ethel Clayton; House Peters
- Cinematography: Edward Earle (not the actor)
- Production company: Lubin Manufacturing Company
- Distributed by: V-L-S-E
- Release date: December 20, 1915
- Running time: 5 reels
- Country: United States
- Language: Silent (English intertitles)

The Great Divide is a 1915 American silent drama film produced by the Lubin Manufacturing Company and starring Ethel Clayton. It is based on the 1906 stage play The Great Divide by William Vaughn Moody.

== Cast ==
- Ethel Clayton as Ruth Jordan
- House Peters as Stephen Ghent
- Marie Sterling as Mrs. Jordan
- Hayden Stevenson as Phil Jordan
- Mary Moore as Phil Jordan's Wife
- Warner Richmond as Dr. Newberry
- Fred O'Beck as Dutch (credited as Ferdinand O'Beck)
- Ray Chamberlin as Pedro

== Preservation ==
A complete print of The Great Divide survives at the British Film Institute.
