= Margaret Livingston =

American actress and businesswoman (1895–1984)

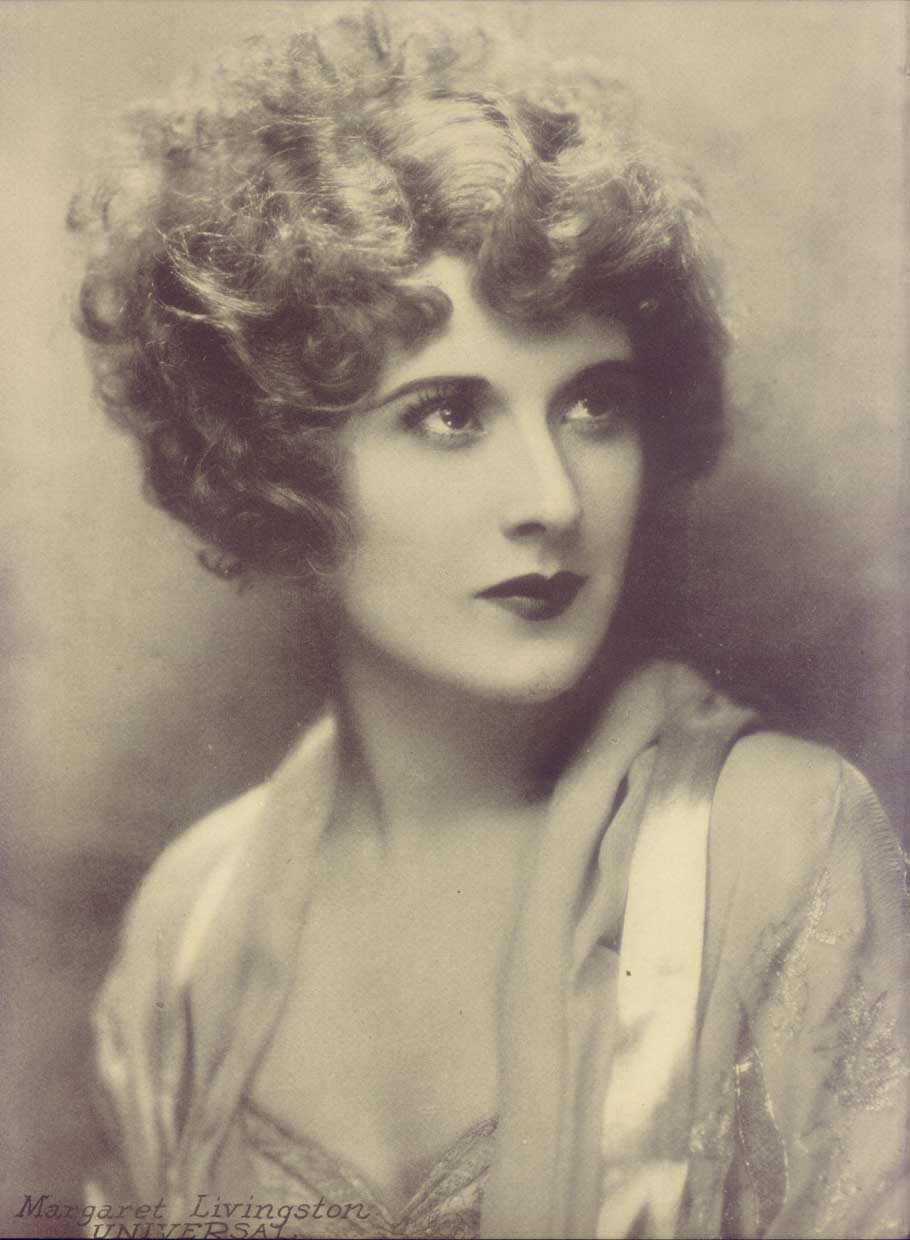
- Livingston in 1929
- Born: Marguerite Livingston; November 25, 1895; Salt Lake City, Utah, U.S.
- Died: December 13, 1984 (aged 89); Warrington, Pennsylvania, U.S.
- Other names: Margaret Livingstone; Marguerite Livingstone
- Occupation: Actress
- Years active: 1916–1934
- Spouse: Paul Whiteman (m. 1931; died 1967)
- Children: 4

Margaret Livingston (born Marguerite Livingston; November 25, 1895 – December 13, 1984), sometimes credited as Marguerite Livingstone or Margaret Livingstone, was an American film actress and businesswoman during the silent film era. She is remembered today as "the Woman from the City" in F. W. Murnau's 1927 film Sunrise: A Song of Two Humans.

== Early life ==
Livingston was born in Salt Lake City, Utah to John Livingston, a Scottish immigrant, and Eda Livingston (née Frome), who was born in Stockholm, Sweden. She was raised in Salt Lake City along with her older sister, Ivy, who also became a film actress.

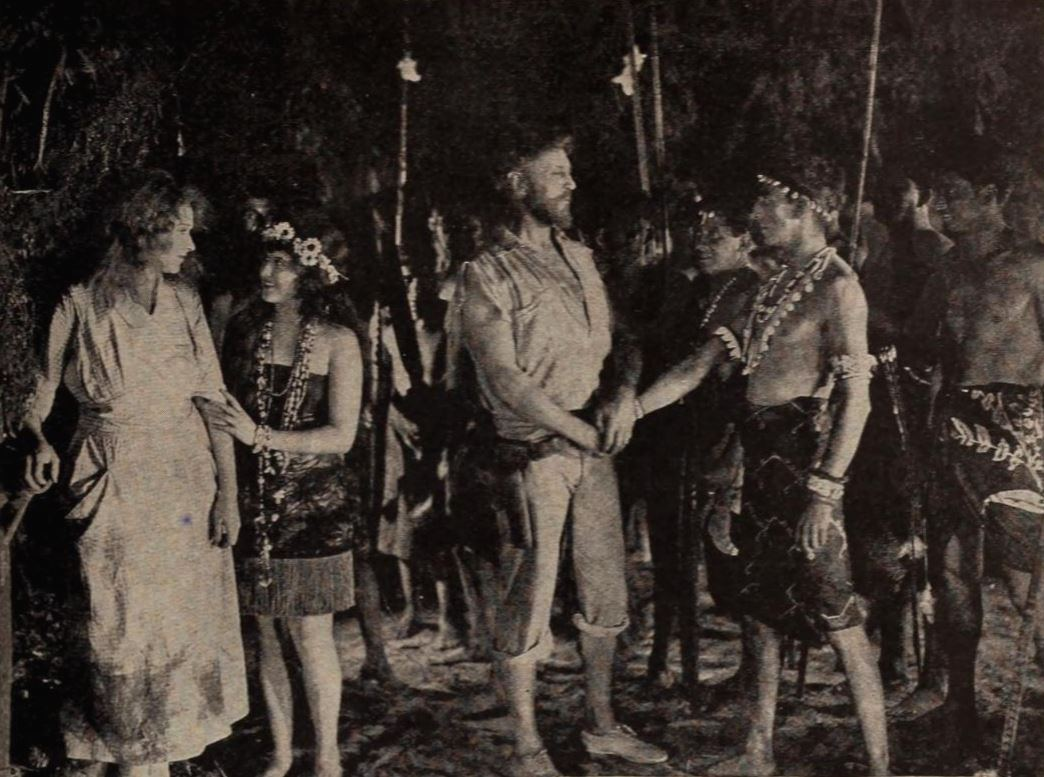
Livingston in 1920. She is seen here in a still from the 1920 film The Brute Master

== Career ==
The young Livingston made her debut in films in 1916. She made over 50 films during the "silent era," most notably in F.W. Murnau's Sunrise: A Song of Two Humans, and a further 20 films after she successfully made the transition to sound film in 1929, including Smart Money starring Edward G. Robinson and James Cagney. She occasionally dubbed voices for some other actresses, including Louise Brooks for The Canary Murder Case (1929).

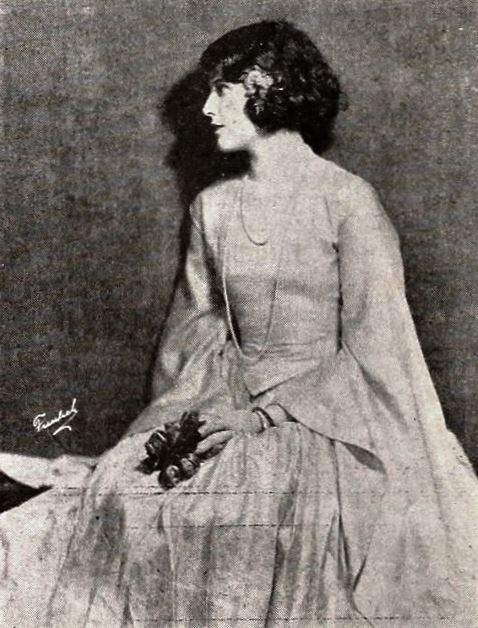
Still of Margaret Livingston in The Social Buccaneer

Livingston was a guest on William Randolph Hearst's yacht the Oneida during the weekend in November 1924 with film director and producer Thomas Ince, who later died of heart failure. In the Peter Bogdanovich film The Cat's Meow (2001), Livingston, played by Claudia Harrison, is depicted as having an affair with Ince at the time of his death.

== Later life ==
On August 18, 1931, Livingston married the band leader Paul Whiteman in a ceremony in Denver, Colorado. She retired from film acting in 1934. Livingston was unable to have children, and adopted four with her husband. She spent the remainder of her life investing in oil ventures and real estate, and was a partner in the construction of the Colonial House in West Hollywood, California.

== Death ==
Livingston died in Warrington, Pennsylvania on December 13, 1984, at age 89.

== Filmography ==
- The Chain Invisible (1916) as Elizabeth King
- Alimony (1917) as Florence (as Marguerite Livingston)
- Within the Cup (1918) as Minor Role
- The Busher (1919) (uncredited)
- All Wrong (1919) as Ethel Goodwin (as Marguerite Livingston)
- Haunting Shadows (1919) as Marian Deveraux (as Marguerite Livingston)
- What's Your Husband Doing? (1920) as Madge Mitchell
- Water, Water, Everywhere (1920) as Martha Beecher
- Hairpins (1920) as Effie Wainwright
- The Brute Master (1920) as The Native 'Taupou'
- The Parish Priest (1920) as Agnnes Cassidy
- Lying Lips (1921) as Lelia Dodson
- The Home Stretch (1921) as Molly
- Colorado Pluck (1921) as Angela Featherstone
- Passing Through (1921) as Louise Kingston
- Eden and Return (1921) as Connie Demarest
- The Social Buccaneer (1923) as Princess Elise
- Divorce (1923) as Gloria Gayne
- Love's Whirlpool (1924) as A Maid
- Wandering Husbands (1924) as Marilyn Foster
- Her Marriage Vow (1924) as Estelle Winslow
- Butterfly (1924) as Violet Van De Wort
- The Chorus Lady (1924) as Patricia O'Brien
- The First Year (1926) as Mrs. Barstow
- Capital Punishment (1925) as Mona Caldwell
- Up the Ladder (1925) as Helen Newhall
- I'll Show You the Town (1925) as Lucille Pemberton
- Greater Than a Crown (1925) as Molly Montrose
- The Wheel (1925) as Elsie Dixon
- Havoc (1925) as Violet Deering
- After Marriage (1925) as Alma Lathrop
- The Best People (1925) as Millie Montgomery
- When the Door Opened (1925) as Mrs. Grenfal
- Wages for Wives (1925) as Carol Bixby
- The Yankee Señor (1926) as Flora
- Hell's Four Hundred (1926) as Evelyn Vance
- A Trip to Chinatown (1926) as Alicia Cuyer
- The Blue Eagle (1926) as Mrs. Mary Rohan
- Womanpower (1926) as Dot
- Breed of the Sea (1926) as Marietta Rawdon
- Slaves of Beauty (1927) as Goldie
- Secret Studio (1927) as Nina Clark
- Lightning (1927) as Dot Deal / Little Eva
- Married Alive (1927) as Amy Duxbury
- The Girl from Gay Paree (1927) as Gertie
- Sunrise: A Song of Two Humans (1927) as The Woman from the City
- American Beauty (1927) as Mrs. Gillespie
- Streets of Shanghai (1927) as Sadie
- A Woman's Way (1928) as Liane
- Mad Hour (1928) as Maid
- The Scarlet Dove (1928) as Olga
- Wheel of Chance (1928) as Josie Drew
- The Way of the Strong (1928) as Marie
- Say It With Sables (1928) as Irene Gordon
- Through the Breakers (1928) as Diane Garrett
- Beware of Bachelors (1928) as Miss Pfeffer, the vamp
- His Private Life (1928) as Yvette Bérgere
- The Apache (1928) as Sonya
- The Last Warning (1929) as Evalynda Hendon
- Dreary House (1928) as Nancy Crowl
- The Bellamy Trial (1929) as Mimi Bellamy
- The Canary Murder Case (1929, voice only, dubbed dialogue for Louise Brooks) as Margaret Odell (uncredited)
- The Office Scandal (1929) as Lillian Tracy
- The Charlatan (1929) as Florence Talbot
- Innocents of Paris (1929) as Madame Renard
- The Girl Who Wouldn't Wait (1929) as Judy Judd
- Tonight at Twelve (1929) as Nan Stoddard
- Acquitted (1929) as Marian Smith
- Seven Keys to Baldpate (1929) as Myra Thornhill
- Murder on the Roof (1930) as Marcia
- For the Love o' Lil (1930) as Eleanor Cartwright
- What a Widow! (1930) as Valli
- Big Money (1930) as Mae
- The Lady Refuses (1931) as Berthine Waller
- Kiki (1931) as Paulette Vaile
- God's Gift to Women (1931) as Tania Donaliff
- Smart Money (1931) as District Attorney's girl
- Broadminded (1931) as Mabel Robinson
- Call Her Savage (1932) as Molly
- Social Register (1934) as Gloria (final film role)
