= Six Cylinder Love (1923 film) =

1923 film by Elmer Clifton

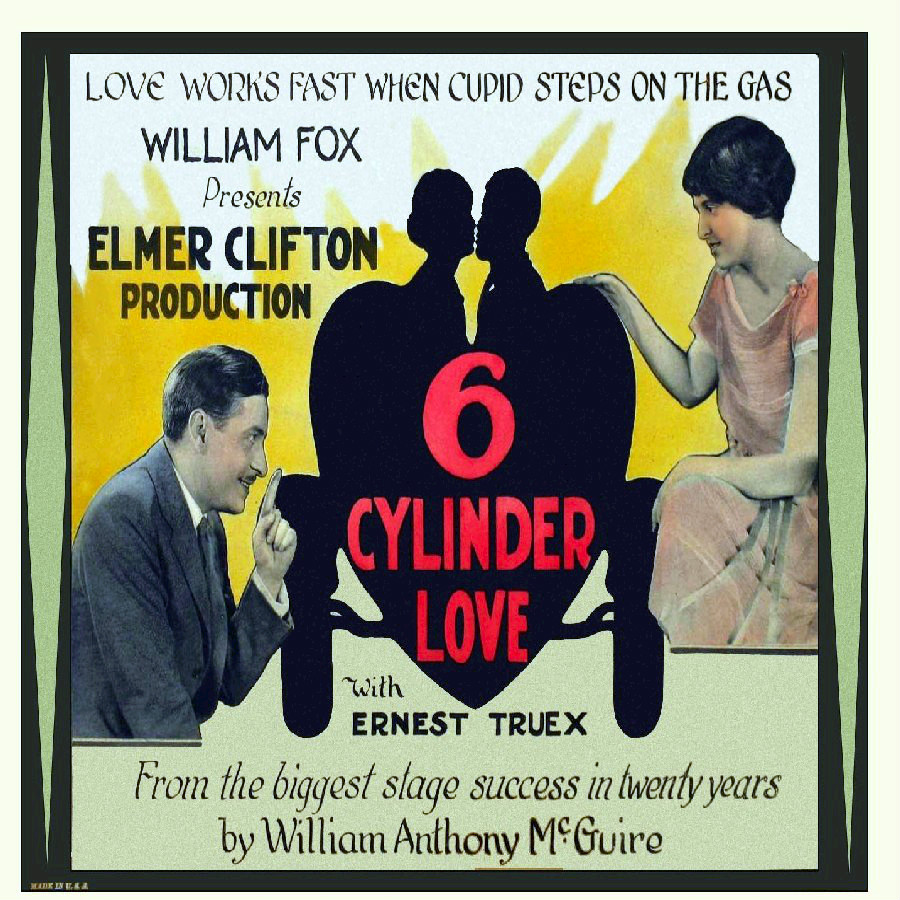
- Film poster
- Directed by: Elmer Clifton
- Written by: Carl Stearns Clancy
- Based on: Six Cylinder Love by William Anthony McGuire
- Produced by: William Fox
- Starring: Ernest Truex; Florence Eldridge /Donald Meek
- Cinematography: Alexander G. Penrod
- Edited by: Ralph Spence
- Distributed by: Fox Film Corporation
- Release date: November 4, 1923
- Running time: 7 reels
- Country: United States
- Language: Silent (English intertitles)

Six Cylinder Love is a lost 1923 American silent comedy film produced and distributed by Fox Film and directed by Elmer Clifton. The film is based on a popular 1921 Broadway play and stars Ernest Truex from the play. Other actors appearing in the film from the Broadway play are Donald Meek and Ralph Sipperly.

Both Hedda Hopper and June Walker had substantial roles in the long-running play, but did not appear in the film. Walker's part was played by ingenue Florence Eldridge in her first film. Also making their film debuts are Donald Meek and Thomas Mitchell. In 1931, Fox produced an early sound remake starring newcomer Spencer Tracy. The 20th Century Fox studio remade the story in 1939 as The Honeymoon's Over.

== Plot ==
As described in a film magazine review, newlyweds Gilbert and Marilyn Sterling make their home in a pleasant suburb. The young wife explains that she wants an automobile badly. The husband takes out a mortgage on the home and buys a machine from crafty auto salesman William Donroy, which then leads to fresh extravagances. The couple gets in with a fast set and Gilbert borrows some cash from his employer. The employer discovers the theft, but accepts Gilbert's promise to work hard and make good and atone for his embezzlement. Gilbert gets rid of all of his sponging relatives, moves to the city, and makes good on his promise. All ends well for the couple.

== Cast ==
- Ernest Truex as Gilbert Sterling
- Florence Eldridge as Marilyn Sterling
- Donald Meek as Richard Burton
- Maude Hill as Geraldine Burton
- Ann McKittrick as Phyllis Burton
- Marjorie Milton as Marguerite Rogers
- Thomas Mitchell as Bertram Rogers
- Ralph Sipperly as William Donroy
- Berton Churchill as George Stapleton
- Helen Morgan (unbilled extra)

== Preservation ==
With no prints of Six Cylinder Love located in any film archives, it is a lost film.
