= Priscilla Moran =

American silent film actress (1918–2006)

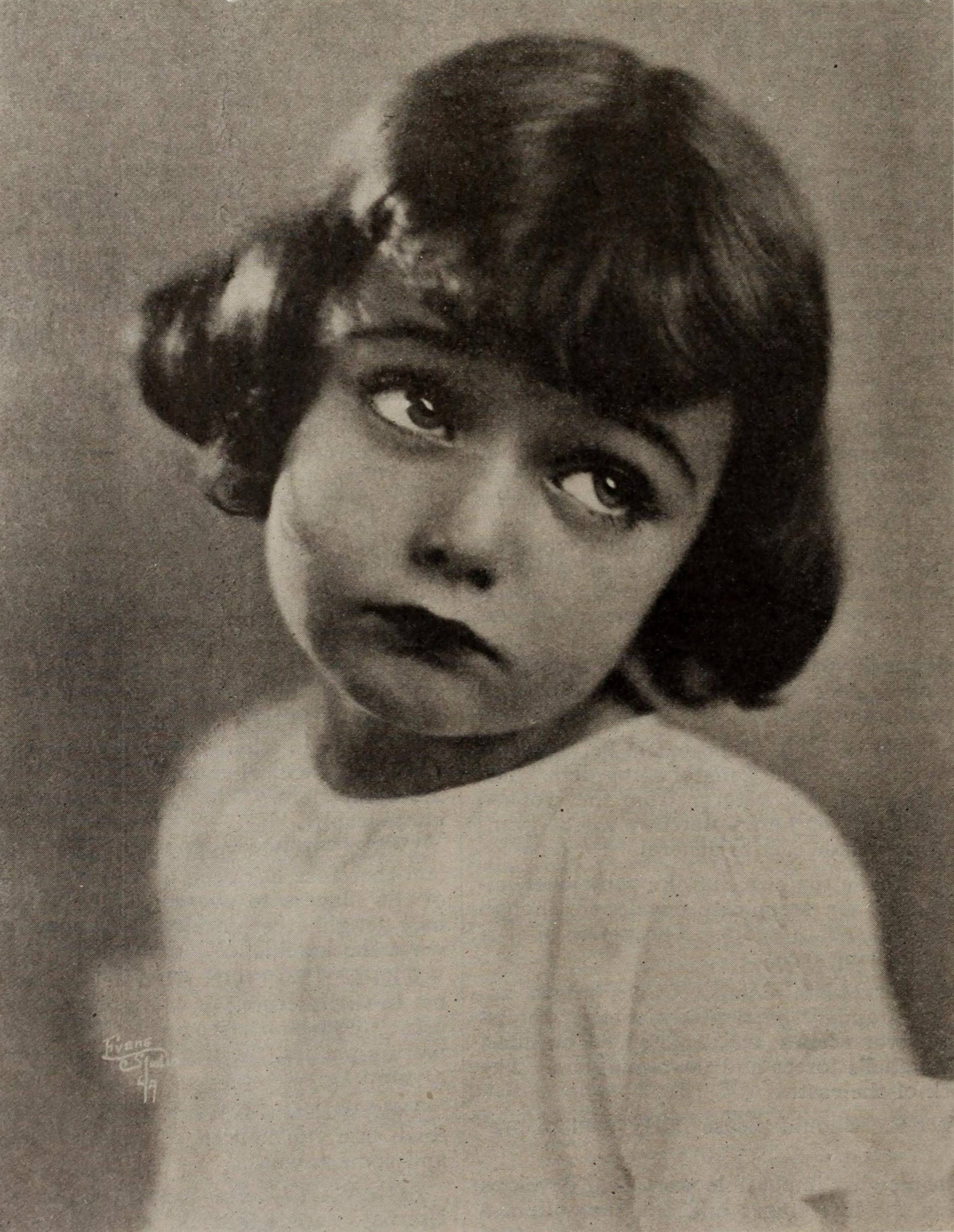
- Moran in 1923
- Born: November 23, 1918; Sedalia, Missouri, U.S.
- Died: November 11, 2006
- Occupation: Actress
- Years active: 1922–1937

Priscilla Moran (November 23, 1918 - November 11, 2006) was an American silent film actress. She made her film debut in 1922, and retired from the silver screen in 1937 at the age of 19, having appeared in fourteen films.

== Personal life ==
Moran was born in November 1918 in Sedalia, Missouri, the daughter of Leo Anthony Moran, an actor. After her father died in Arizona in 1926, Myrtle and John C. Ragland became her guardians: this caused a custody battle in which she was eventually given to her paternal aunt Margaret Moran Becker.

== Selected filmography ==
- The Toll of the Sea (1922)
- Daddies (1924)
- Love and Glory (1924)
- A Self-Made Failure (1924)
- Her Marriage Vow (1924)
- Up the Ladder (1925)
- No Babies Wanted (1928)
