= The Apache (1928 film) =

1928 film

- Directed by: Phil Rosen
- Written by: Harriet Hinsdale; Ramon Romero
- Produced by: Jack Cohn
- Starring: Margaret Livingston; Warner Richmond; Don Alvarado
- Cinematography: Ted Tetzlaff
- Production company: Columbia Pictures
- Distributed by: Columbia Pictures
- Release date: November 19, 1928
- Running time: 57 minutes
- Country: United States
- Languages: Silent; English intertitles

The Apache is a lost 1928 American silent mystery film directed by Phil Rosen and starring Margaret Livingston, Warner Richmond and Don Alvarado.

The film's sets were designed by the art director Harrison Wiley.

== Cast ==
- Margaret Livingston as Sonya
- Warner Richmond as Gaston Laroux
- Don Alvarado as Pierre Dumont
- Philo McCullough as Mons. Chautard

== Bibliography ==
- Munden, Kenneth White. The American Film Institute Catalog of Motion Pictures Produced in the United States, Part 1. University of California Press, 1997.
