= Husbands for Rent =

1927 film

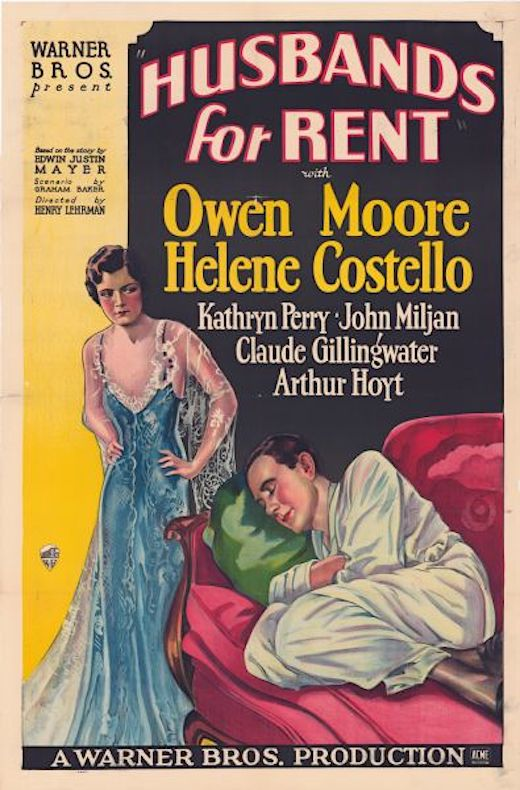
- Theatrical release poster
- Directed by: Henry Lehrman
- Screenplay by: C. Graham Baker; Joseph Jackson; Jimmy Starr
- Story by: Edwin Justus Mayer
- Starring: Owen Moore; Helene Costello; Katherine Perry; John Miljan; Claude Gillingwater; Arthur Hoyt
- Cinematography: Barney McGill
- Edited by: Clarence Kolster
- Production company: Warner Bros.
- Distributed by: Warner Bros.
- Release date: December 31, 1927
- Running time: 60 minutes
- Country: United States
- Languages: Sound (Synchronized) (English intertitles)

Husbands for Rent is a 1927 American synchronized sound comedy film directed by Henry Lehrman and written by C. Graham Baker, Joseph Jackson, and Jimmy Starr. While the film has no audible dialog, it was released with a synchronized musical score with sound effects using the Vitaphone sound-on-disc process. The film stars Owen Moore, Helene Costello, Katherine Perry, John Miljan, Claude Gillingwater, and Arthur Hoyt. The film was released by Warner Bros. on December 31, 1927.

== Plot ==
Sir Reginald Knight, a seasoned matchmaker with a taste for decorum and dynastic arrangements, has long planned for his spirited ward Doris Knight to marry his nephew, Herbert Willis. The union is all but assured—until Herbert departs on a hunting expedition to India, leaving their engagement in the hands of time and presumption.

While Herbert is abroad, Doris is swept off her feet by the charming and fashionable Hugh Fraser, whose flirtatious devotion convinces her she's experiencing love for the first time. But halfway around the globe, Herbert too is falling—this time for the dazzling and impetuous Molly DeVoe, whose vivacious charms are worlds apart from Doris’ refined demeanor.

Upon Herbert's return, the once-promised couple awkwardly confess to one another that they've both fallen in love with others. Stung with pride but relieved, they amicably part ways. But when Hugh and Molly meet at a dinner party hosted by Sir Reginald, sparks fly—and not between their original partners. The flighty pair are drawn to one another with immediate and flamboyant flair.

Society is scandalized by the announcements of two unexpected engagements: Doris to Hugh and Herbert to Molly. But even that pales in comparison to the twist that follows: on the eve of the double wedding, Hugh and Molly elope with each other, leaving Doris and Herbert in matching social disgrace.

Sir Reginald, never one to let a crisis go unchoreographed, urges Doris to salvage her pride and reputation by marrying Herbert after all. Simultaneously, he makes the same case to Herbert. The result: a hasty wedding at the Ritz Hotel between two spurned lovers, now bound by mutual obligation and shared embarrassment.

Time passes in a chill. Though Doris and Herbert begin to harbor true affection for one another, each wrongly believes the other is still in love with their ex. A chance encounter at the Ritz brings the romantic quadrangle full circle: Herbert is dining uncomfortably with Molly, while Doris, reluctantly meeting Hugh, is seated nearby. Both realize they've outgrown their former flames—but neither dares to speak the truth.

Distraught, Doris pleads with Sir Reginald for a divorce to free Herbert for a life with Molly. Herbert makes the same request, believing Doris would be happier with Hugh. The ever-scheming Sir Reginald agrees—but insists that a scandal must be manufactured in order to justify a divorce.

The scene is set. Sir Reginald arranges for Doris and Herbert to meet their "co-respondents"—each unaware that they've been led to the same darkened bridal suite where they were once married. When the lights come on, they see only each other.

Perplexed but hopeful, they look to Sir Reginald for an explanation.

“Well,” he says slyly, “each of you was so anxious for the other’s happiness—I thought I’d help you find it.”

And with that, the barriers fall. Herbert and Doris finally embrace their true feelings, proving that sometimes love can only blossom once all the wrong matches have been made.

== Cast ==
- Owen Moore as Herbert Willis
- Helene Costello as Molly Devoe
- Katherine Perry as Doris Knight
- John Miljan as Hugh Frazer
- Claude Gillingwater as Sir Reginald Knight
- Arthur Hoyt as Waldo Squibbs
- Helen Lynch as Maid
- Hugh Herbert as Valet

== Censorship ==
When Husbands for Rent was released, many states and cities in the United States had censor boards that could require cuts or other eliminations before the film could be shown. The Kansas censor board ordered the elimination of all scenes after the bride enters the bedroom and removes her hat.

== Preservation ==
Husbands for Rent is a lost film.
