= A Divorce of Convenience =

1921 silent film

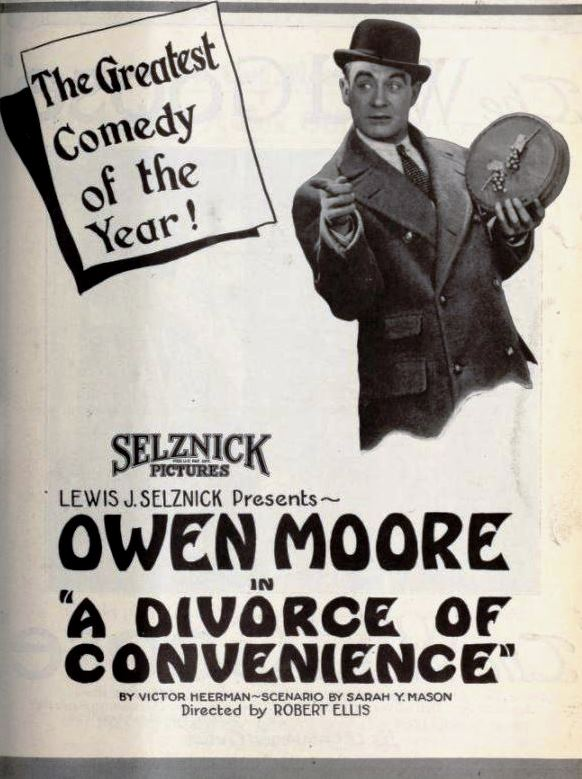
- Directed by: Robert Ellis
- Written by: Victor Heerman; Sarah Y. Mason
- Produced by: Lewis J. Selznick
- Starring: Owen Moore; Katherine Perry; Nita Naldi
- Cinematography: Alfred Gandolfi
- Production company: Selznick Pictures
- Distributed by: Selznick Pictures
- Release date: May 1921
- Running time: 50 minutes
- Country: United States
- Languages: Silent; English intertitles

A Divorce of Convenience is a 1921 American silent comedy film directed by Robert Ellis and starring Owen Moore, Katherine Perry and Nita Naldi.

== Cast ==
- Owen Moore as Jim Blake
- Katherine Perry as Helen Wakefield
- George Lessey as Sen. Wakefield
- Nita Naldi as Tula Moliana
- Frank Wunderlee as Blinkwell Jones
- Dan Duffy as Mr. Hart
- Charles Craig as Mr. Holmes

== Bibliography ==
- Munden, Kenneth White. The American Film Institute Catalog of Motion Pictures Produced in the United States, Part 1. University of California Press, 1997.
