= Side Street (1929 film) =

1929 film

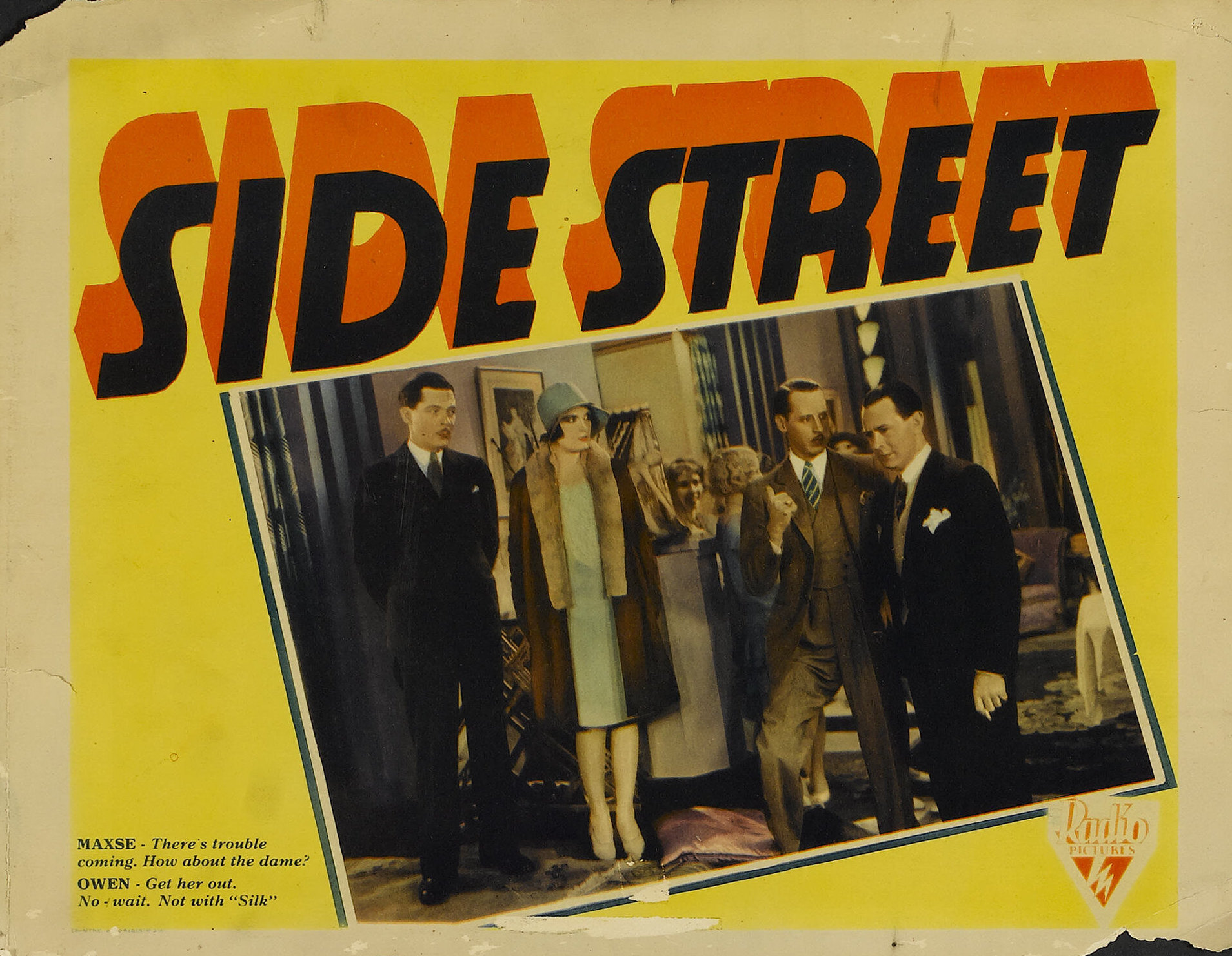
- Lobby card for the film
- Directed by: Malcolm St. Clair
- Written by: George O'Hara (screenplay); Jane Murfin (screenplay); John Russell (screenplay); Malcolm St. Clair (story)
- Produced by: William LeBaron
- Starring: Tom Moore; Owen Moore; Matt Moore; George Raft
- Cinematography: William Marshall; Nicholas Musuraca
- Music by: Oscar Levant; Sidney Clare
- Production company: RKO Radio Pictures
- Distributed by: RKO Radio Pictures
- Release date: September 8, 1929 (US)
- Running time: 70 minutes
- Country: United States
- Language: English

Side Street is a 1929 American Pre-Code drama film featuring the only screen teaming of all three Moore Brothers (Tom, Owen, and Matt), each of them major silent film stars. George Raft also makes an uncredited appearance as a professional dancer — which Raft was at the time — dancing to the song "Take a Look at Her Now", sung by June Clyde. Side Street was directed by Malcolm St. Clair with a screenplay by George O'Hara and Jane Murfin, based on a story by St. Clair, which was adapted by John Russell.

== Plot ==
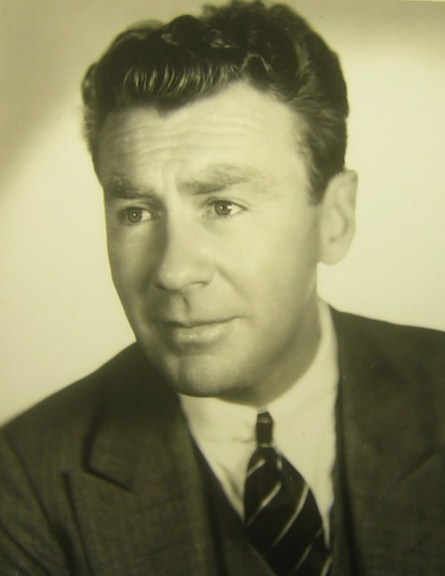
Tom Moore as Jimmy in Side Street

The film chronicles the exploits of three Irish brothers. Jimmy is a cop, John is an emergency room doctor, and Dennis, as far as his family is aware of, is a very wealthy businessman, even having paid for John to go to medical school. Their parents, Nora and Tom, are very proud of all three sons. Jimmy is promoted on the police force, and begins the investigation of a murder involving the infamous Muller gang.

As this crime drama unfolds, the viewer is introduced to Dennis's other life. In reality he is a powerful racketeer and bootlegger, but he keeps his two personas separate in order to protect his family from any consequences of his criminal activity. However, eventually Jimmy's fiancé, Kathleen Doyle, attends a party thrown by Muller at one of his houses. During the party, she inadvertently learns that Silk is a killer hired by Muller, who was responsible for the murder her fiancé is investigating.

Meanwhile, John goes out on an emergency call to care for a man who has been injured in a drunken brawl. While he is treating the injured man, he accidentally discovers that Muller is none other than his brother, Dennis. When Kathleen meets Jimmy and tells him about her discovery, unbeknownst to them, she is overheard by one of Muller's gang, who then plots with the other gang members to ambush and kill Jimmy.

On Thanksgiving, Dennis realizes his cover has been blown, and he realizes his brother, Jimmy, is in danger. He and John rush off to warn Jimmy, but as they arrive at the ambush, Dennis saves his brother, but gets shot by his own men instead. He dies in the arms of both of his brothers, who later tell their parents that he has gone off on another one of his mysterious journeys, perhaps this time for good.

== Cast ==
- Tom Moore - Jimmy O'Farrell
- Owen Moore - Dennis O'Farrell
- Matt Moore - John O'Farrell
- Emma Dunn - Mrs. Nora O'Farrell
- Katherine Perry - Kathleen Doyle
- Frank Sheridan - Mr. Tom O'Farrell
- Charles Byer - Maxse Kimball
- Arthur Housman - Henchman Silk Ruffo
- Mildred Harris - Bunny
- Walter MacNamara - Patrick Doyle
- George Raft - Georgie Ames, the dancer (uncredited)
- June Clyde - Judy, the singer (uncredited)

== Film preservation and other notes ==
Side Street, which survives in its entirety, is George Raft's oldest surviving movie. His first movie, Queen of the Night Clubs, is a lost film (only a small excerpt survives); and his second movie, Gold Diggers of Broadway, is also a lost film (only 2 out of 10 reels survive).

Mildred Harris had been a silent film star, as well as being the ex-wife of Charlie Chaplin.

The film is known as The Three Brothers in Great Britain, and as L'Ultimo Viaggio in Italy.

== See also ==
- List of early sound feature films (1926–1929)
