= The Toll of the Sea =

1922 film by Chester M. Franklin

- Film poster
- Directed by: Chester M. Franklin
- Written by: Frances Marion
- Produced by: Herbert T. Kalmus
- Starring: Anna May Wong; Kenneth Harlan; Beatrice Bentley
- Cinematography: J.A. Ball
- Edited by: Hal C. Kern
- Production company: Technicolor Motion Picture Corporation
- Distributed by: Metro Pictures Corporation
- Release dates: November 26, 1922 (NYC); January 22, 1923 (US)
- Running time: 53 minutes
- Country: United States
- Languages: Silent; English intertitles

The Toll of the Sea is a 1922 American silent drama film directed by Chester M. Franklin, produced by the Technicolor Motion Picture Corporation, released by Metro Pictures, and featuring Anna May Wong in her first leading role. The film was written by Frances Marion and directed by Chester M. Franklin (brother of director Sidney Franklin), with the lead roles played by Wong and Kenneth Harlan. The plot was a variation of the Madama Butterfly story, set in China instead of Japan.

The film was the second Technicolor feature (after 1917's The Gulf Between), and the first Technicolor color feature anywhere that did not require a special projector to be used for screenings.

The film premiered on November 26, 1922, at the Rialto Theatre in New York City, and went into general release on January 22, 1923.

== Plot ==
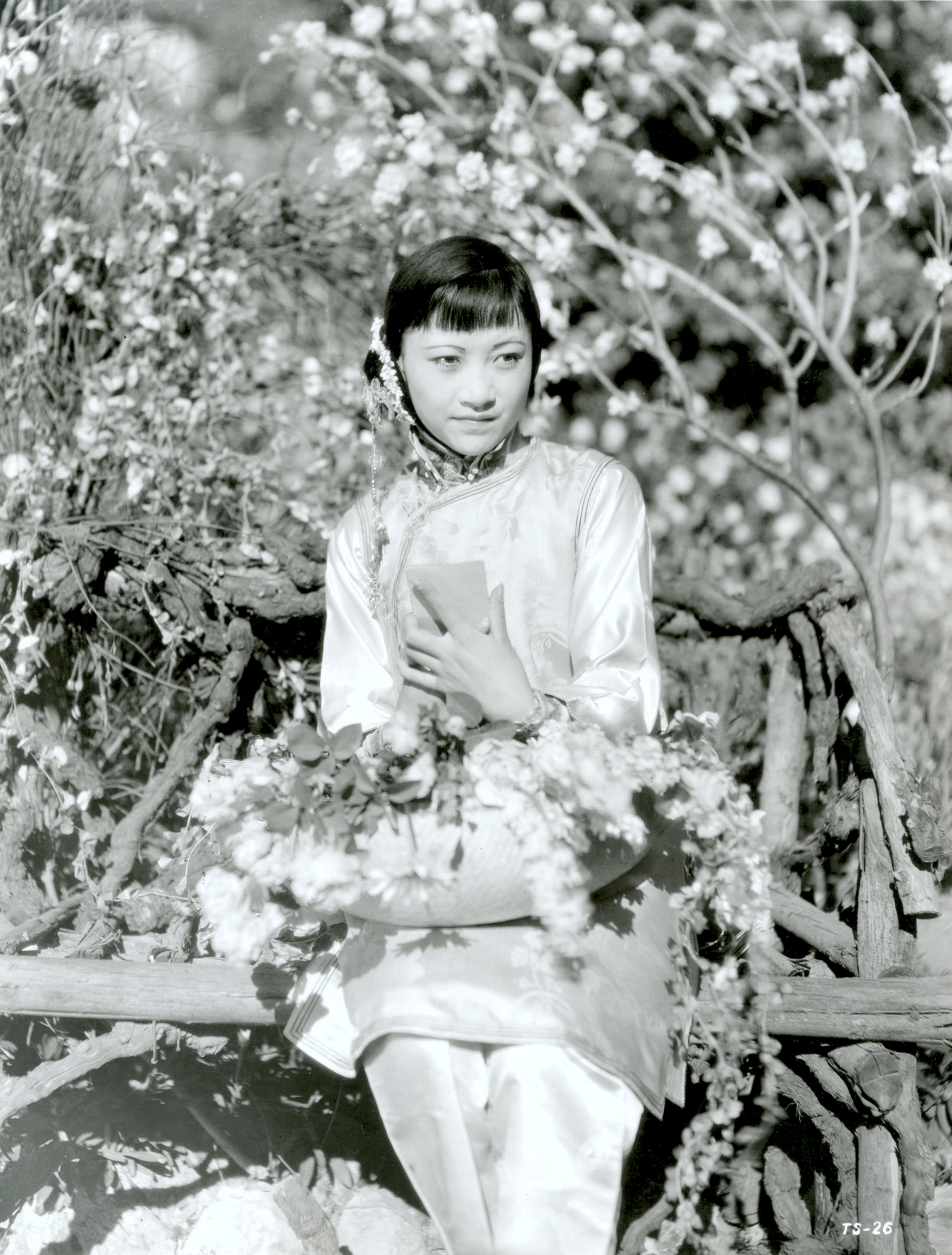
Anna May Wong on the set of The Toll of the Sea

In 1919, a young Chinese woman, Lotus Flower, sees an unconscious man floating in the water at the seashore, and quickly gets help for him. The man is Allen Carver, an American. Soon the two have fallen in love, and they get married "Chinese fashion". Carver promises to take her with him when he returns home. Chinese Gossips warn her that he will leave without her, and one states she has been forgotten by four American husbands, but Lotus Flower does not believe them. However, Carver's friends discourage him from fulfilling his promise, and he returns to the United States alone.

Lotus Flower gives birth to a son, whom she names Allen after his father. When the older Allen finally returns to China, Lotus Flower is at first overjoyed. She dresses in her elaborate Chinese bridal gown to greet him. However, he is accompanied by his American wife, Elsie. Allen has told Elsie about Lotus Flower, and it is Elsie who persuaded her husband to tell Lotus Flower the real situation. When the boy is brought to see his father, Lotus Flower pretends he is the child of her American neighbors. Later, though, she confides the truth to Elsie and asks her to take the boy to America. She tells the child that Elsie is his real mother. After Elsie takes the boy away with her, Lotus Flower says, "Oh, Sea, now that life has been emptied I come to pay my great debt to you." The sun is then shown setting over the water, and it is implied that Lotus Flower drowns herself.

== Cast ==
- Anna May Wong as Lotus Flower
- Kenneth Harlan as Allen Carver
- Beatrice Bentley as Barbara 'Elsie' Carver
- Priscilla Moran as Little Allen (as Baby Moran)
- Etta Lee as Gossip
- Ming Young as Gossip

== Production ==
Because the Technicolor camera divided the lens image into two beams to expose two film frames simultaneously through color filters, and at twice the normal frames per second, much higher lighting levels were required. All scenes of The Toll of the Sea were shot under "natural light" and outdoors, with the one "interior" scene shot in sunlight under a muslin sheet.

== Reception ==
Variety described Wong as "extraordinarily fine" and "an exquisite crier without glycerin." The New York Times, said that she was "naturally Chinese" and succeeded in a difficult role, and that "She should be seen again and again on the screen." Photoplay referred to her "fair skin, soft-golden blond hair and youthful-looking dark brown eyes." In England, critics praised her for "practically carrying the film", and noted that her performance was delivered with "real restraint and subtlety that only a true artiste can attain."

== Rediscovery and Restoration ==
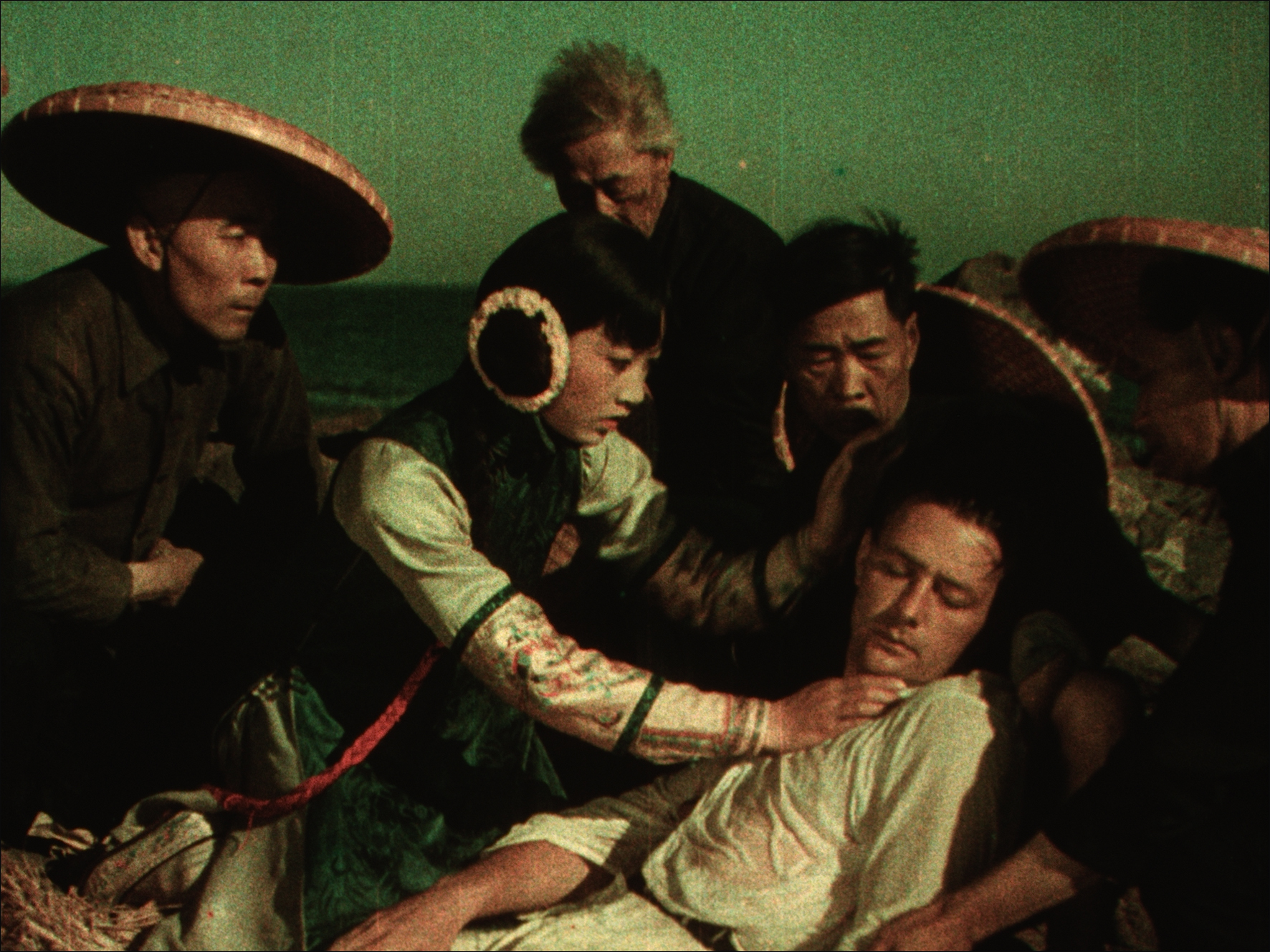
Allen Carver is rescued from the sea

The Toll of the Sea

Once believed to have been lost, the film was restored by the UCLA Film and Television Archive, under the supervision of Robert Gitt and Peter Comandini, from the 35mm nitrate film original camera negative in 1985. As the final two reels were missing, Gitt and Comandini used "an original two-color Technicolor camera" to shoot a sunset on a California beach, "much as the film's original closing must have looked."

== Home media ==
The restored version is available as one of the titles included in the 4-DVD box-set Treasures from American Film Archives, 50 Preserved Films.

== Google Doodle ==
On January 22, 2020, a Google Doodle celebrated Anna May Wong, commemorating the 97th anniversary of the day The Toll of the Sea went into general release.

== See also ==
- List of early color feature films
