= Harriet Hinsdale =

American writer

- Born: Harriet Broadhurst; January 27, 1883; Chicago, Illinois, USA
- Died: November 1982 (aged 99); Laguna Hills, California, USA
- Occupation(s): Screenwriter, novelist
- Spouse: Charles Hinsdale

Harriet Hinsdale (January 27, 1883 – November 1982) was an American screenwriter, playwright, and author. She was on the writing staff at Warner Brothers for many years as a story editor, and was the author of several novels. She was noted for her theatrical collaborations with Orson Welles, and she often co-wrote projects with Ramon Romero.

== Selected works ==
Film

- Apache (1928)
- No Babies Wanted (1928)

Theater

- Crescendo! (1946)
- Robert Louis Stevenson (1944)
- The Missing Witness (1930)

Literature

- Born to Rope (1972)
- Confederate Gray (1963)
- Be My Love (1950)
