= More Pay, Less Work =

1926 film by Albert Ray

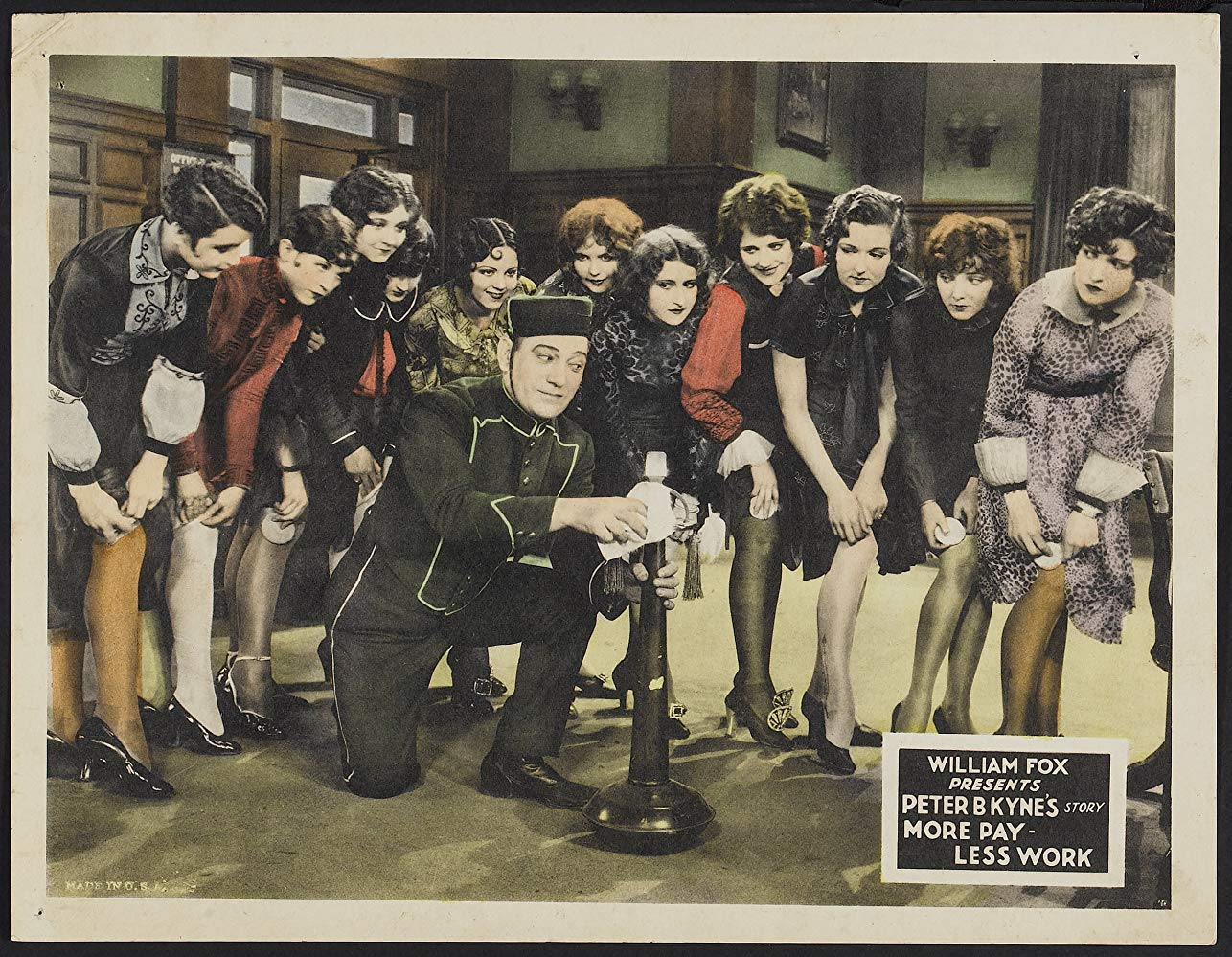
- Lobby card
- Directed by: Albert Ray
- Written by: Rex Taylor
- Based on: "No Shenanigans" by Peter B. Kyne
- Produced by: William Fox
- Starring: Albert Gran; Mary Brian; Charles "Buddy" Rogers
- Cinematography: Sidney Wagner
- Production company: Fox Film
- Distributed by: Fox Film
- Release date: July 4, 1926
- Running time: 6 reels
- Country: United States
- Language: Silent (English intertitles)

More Pay, Less Work, also listed as More Pay – Less Work, is a 1926 American silent comedy film directed by Albert Ray and starring Albert Gran, Mary Brian, and Charles "Buddy" Rogers.

== Plot ==
As described in a film magazine review, Cappy Ricks is still in competition in the shipping business with his friend Dad Hinchfield. Cappy's daughter Betty and Hinchfield's son William are in love, but the parental feud is a handicap. During his father's absence, Willie decides to put some old-fashioned business practices out of existence. He installs a modern system and a flapper office force. He lands a large order from one of Cappy's clients and puts up a $50,000 bond that certain cargo will be delivered at a location on time. This leads to an ocean sequence with adventures, but ends with the cargo delivered on time, peace restored among the old friends, and Willie and Betty headed for the altar.

== Cast ==
- Albert Gran as Cappy Ricks
- Mary Brian as Betty Ricks
- E.J. Ratcliffe as Dad Hinchfield
- Charles "Buddy" Rogers as Willie Hinchfield
- Otto Hoffman as Henry Tweedle
- Heinie Conklin as Janitor

== Preservation ==
A print of More Pay, Less Work is at the UCLA Film & Television Archive. In 2026, to celebrate their 100th anniversary, the Hollywood Theatre in Portland, Oregon screened the UCLA's print of the film – which was the first ever film screened at the theatre in 1926. The screening was accompanied by a live pipe organ performed by organist Dean Lemire. Proceeds from the event went to the Columbia River Theater Organ Society to maintain and preserve the Hollywood's Wurlitzer theatre pipe organ.

== Bibliography ==
- Solomon, Aubrey. The Fox Film Corporation, 1915-1935: A History and Filmography. McFarland & Co., 2011. ISBN 978-0-7864-8610-6
