= Blood Will Tell (1927 film) =

1927 film

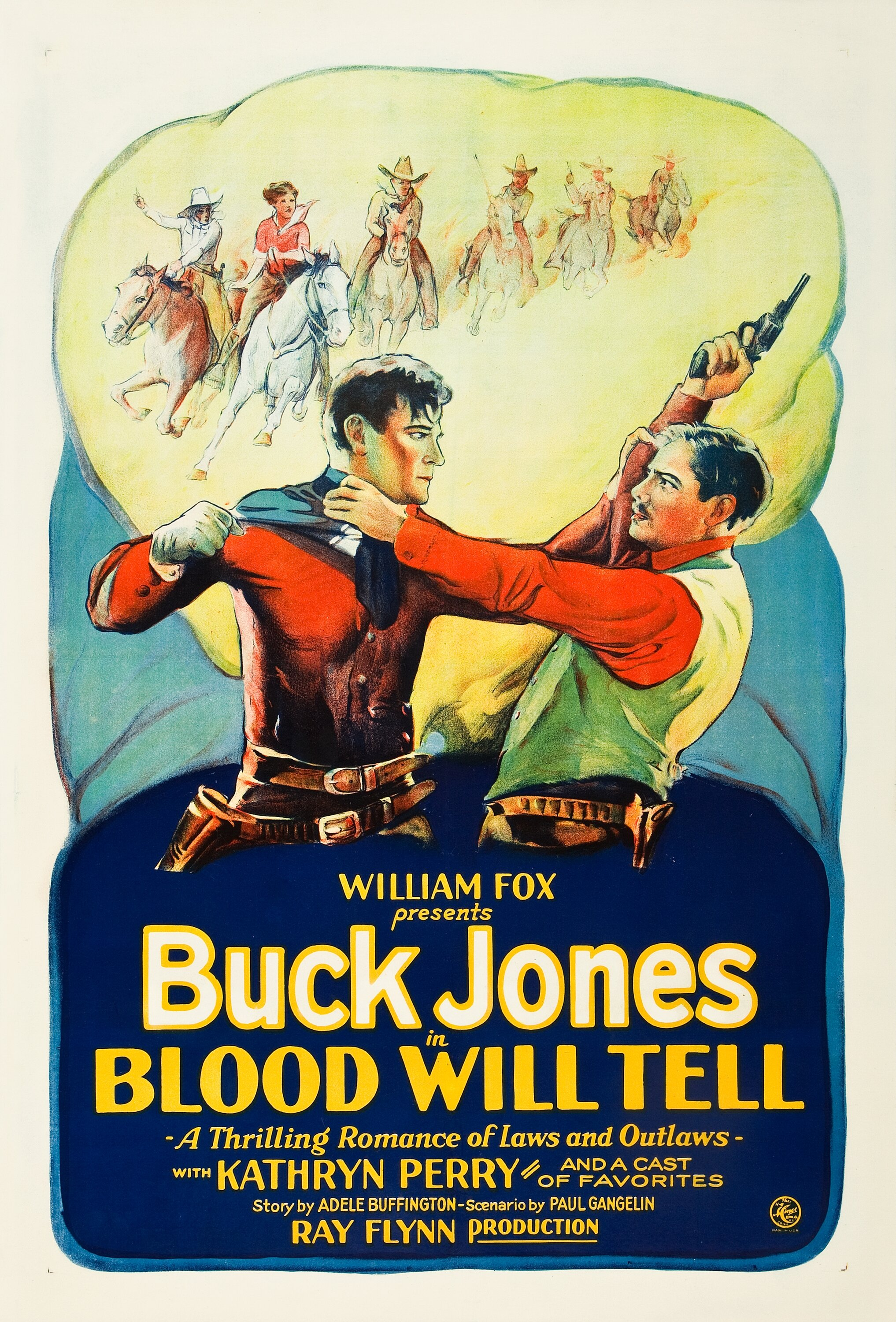
- Theatrical release poster
- Directed by: Ray Flynn
- Screenplay by: Paul Gangelin
- Story by: Adele Buffington
- Starring: Buck Jones; Katherine Perry; Lawford Davidson; Bob Kortman; Harry Gripp; Austen Jewell
- Cinematography: Reginald Lyons
- Production company: Fox Film Corporation
- Distributed by: Fox Film Corporation
- Release date: November 13, 1927
- Running time: 50 minutes
- Country: United States
- Languages: Silent; English intertitles

Blood Will Tell is a lost 1927 American silent Western film directed by Ray Flynn and written by Paul Gangelin. The film stars Buck Jones, Katherine Perry, Lawford Davidson, Bob Kortman, Harry Gripp and Austen Jewell. The film was released on November 13, 1927, by Fox Film Corporation.

== Cast ==
- Buck Jones as Buck Peters
- Katherine Perry as Sally Morgan
- Lawford Davidson as Jim Cowen
- Bob Kortman as Carloon
- Harry Gripp as Sandy
- Austen Jewell as Buddy Morgan

== Preservation ==
With no holdings located in archives, Blood Will Tell is considered a lost film.
