= John Russell (screenwriter) =

American screenwriter

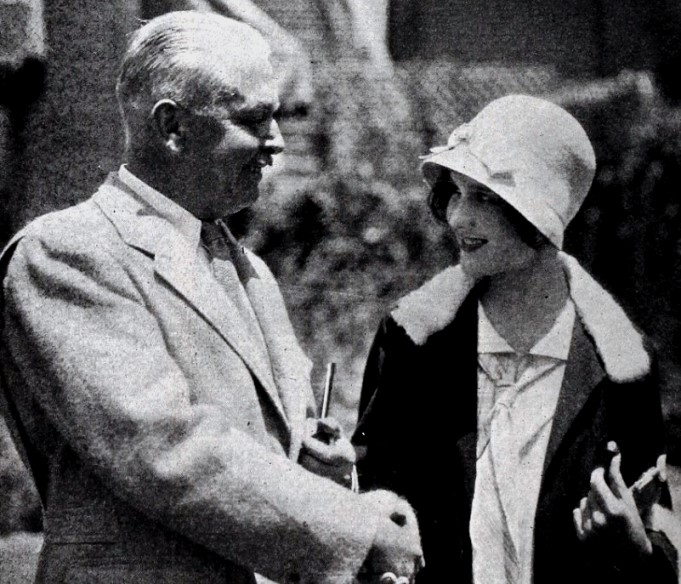
John Russell and actress Mary Brian, who starred in two films with scenarios written by Russell, in 1925

John Russell (22 April 1885 - 6 March 1956) was an American writer and screenwriter.

== Biography ==
Born in Davenport, Iowa, in 1885, Russell wrote for the New York City News Association news agency, and then for the New York Tribune. The Pagan was based on one of his stories, and he wrote the screenplay for Beau Geste.

As author he was best known for his short stories, originally written for a wide range of magazines and newspapers, and then collected in books. He also wrote The Society Wolf, published in 1910, which was written under the pen name Luke Thrice. Other pseudonyms include Edward Rutledge, Andrew Peirce, George Jerry Osborn and Matthew Primus.

Russell died in Santa Monica, California in 1956.

== Books ==
- The Society Wolf writing as Luke Thrice, illustrated by W. H. Loomis and Modest Stein. New York, Cupples & Leon, 1910.
- The Red Mark and Other Stories, Alfred A. Knopf, 1919
- Where the Pavement Ends, Alfred A. Knopf, 1921 (new edition of The Red Mark now using the title from the U. K. edition)
- In Dark Places, Alfred A. Knopf, 1923
- Far Wandering Men, W. W. Norton, 1929
- Cops 'N Robbers, W. W. Norton, 1930

== Partial filmography ==
- Where the Pavement Ends (1923)
- The Exiles (1923)
- Mademoiselle Midnight (1924)
- The Iron Horse (1924)
- Dangerous Money (1924)
- Argentine Love (1924)
- The Little French Girl (1925)
- The Crowded Hour (1925)
- The Street of Forgotten Men (1925)
- Lord Jim (1925)
- Beau Geste (1926)
- The Sorrows of Satan (1926)
- God Gave Me Twenty Cents (1926)
- The Red Mark (1928)
- The Pagan (1929)
- Side Street (1929)
- Girl of the Port (1930)
- The Sea God (1930)
- Frankenstein (1931)
