= Wings of Youth (1925 film) =

1925 film

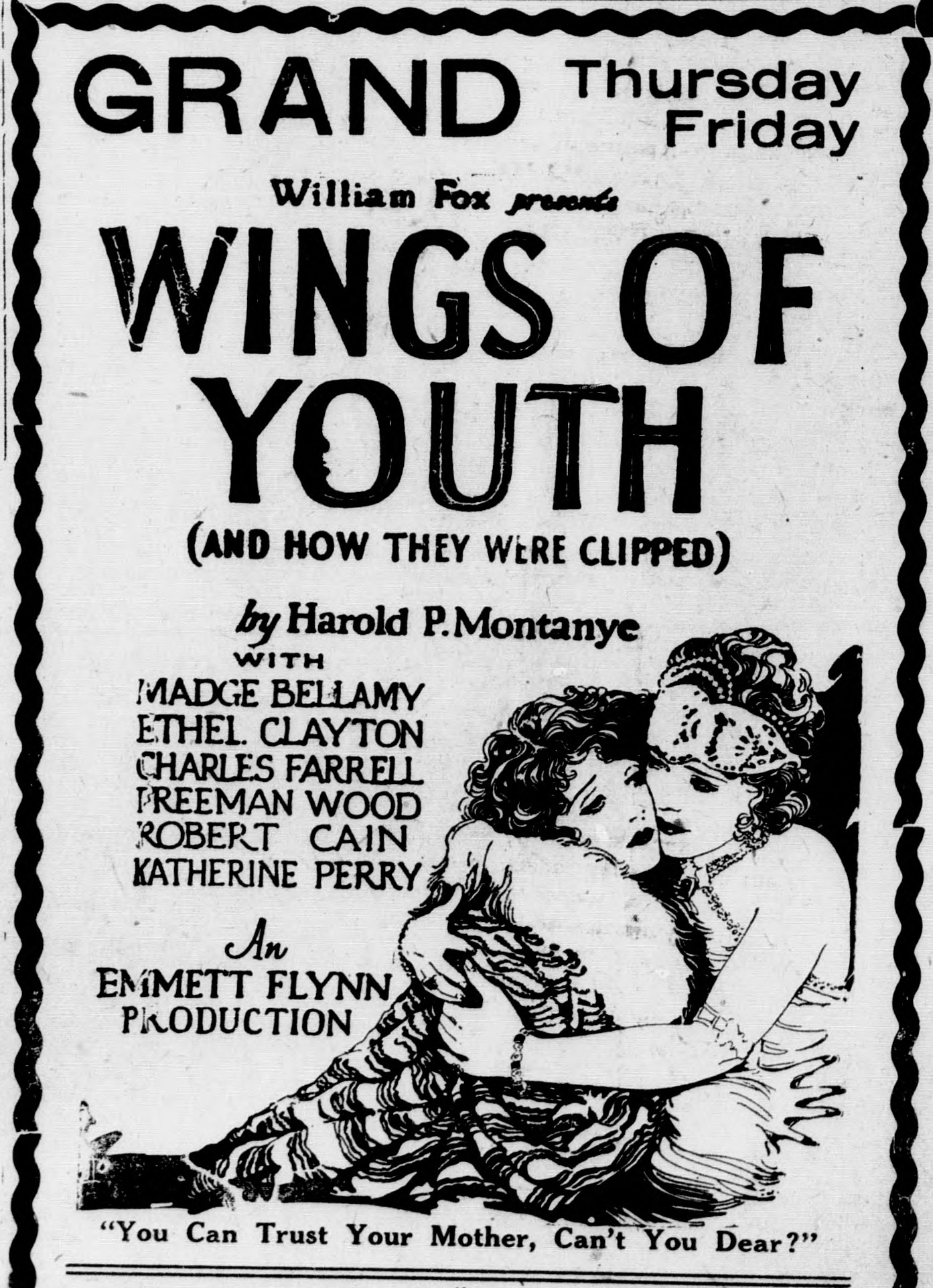
- Contemporary advertisement
- Directed by: Emmett J. Flynn
- Screenplay by: Bernard McConville
- Based on: Sisters of Jezebel by Harold P. Montayne
- Starring: Ethel Clayton; Madge Bellamy; Charles Farrell; Freeman Wood; Robert Cain; Katherine Perry
- Cinematography: Ernest Palmer
- Production company: Fox Film Corporation
- Distributed by: Fox Film Corporation
- Release date: May 21, 1925
- Running time: 60 minutes
- Country: United States
- Language: Silent (English intertitles)

Wings of Youth is a 1925 American silent drama film directed by Emmett J. Flynn and written by Bernard McConville. The film stars Ethel Clayton, Madge Bellamy, Charles Farrell, Freeman Wood, Robert Cain, and Katherine Perry. The film was released on May 21, 1925, by Fox Film Corporation.

== Plot ==
As described in a film magazine review, Mrs. Katherine Manners loves her three grown daughters who are in boarding school. When she plans a party for them at home, they phone from the school that they cannot come because they are too busy. But she hears the sounds of a party in the background, so she goes to the school where she finds her daughters with young men. She is told that two of the daughters plan to be married, while the third plans to marry Grantland Dobbs as soon as he gets a divorce, and the mother is frightened by this announcement. She goes abroad and returns with a man, gets an apartment at a wealthy center, and lives with him. Her daughters are shocked when the mother entertains guests at drinking parties. When Mrs. Manners proves to her daughters that their fiancées are not respectable, she reveals to them that she was acting a part just to prove to them that she was right about their chosen mates. She reveals that the man she was living with was her cousin.

== Cast ==
- Ethel Clayton as Katherine Manners
- Madge Bellamy as Madelyne Manners / Angela Du Bois
- Charles Farrell as Ted Spaulding
- Freeman Wood as Lucien Angoola
- Robert Cain as Pierre Du Bois / Marcus Jones
- Katherine Perry as Gwen Manners
- Marion Harlan as Betty Manners
- George Stewart as Jimmie Dale
- Douglas Gerrard as Grantland Dobbs
