= Early to Wed =

1926 film by Frank Borzage

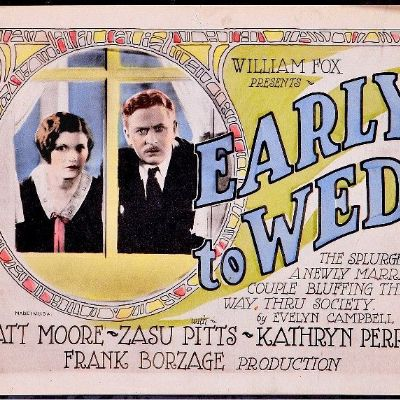
- Lobby card
- Directed by: Frank Borzage
- Written by: Kenneth B. Clarke
- Based on: "Splurge" by Evelyn Campbell
- Produced by: William Fox
- Starring: Matt Moore; Katherine Perry; Albert Gran
- Cinematography: Ernest Palmer
- Production company: Fox Film
- Distributed by: Fox Film
- Release date: April 25, 1926
- Running time: 6 reels
- Country: United States
- Language: Silent (English intertitles)

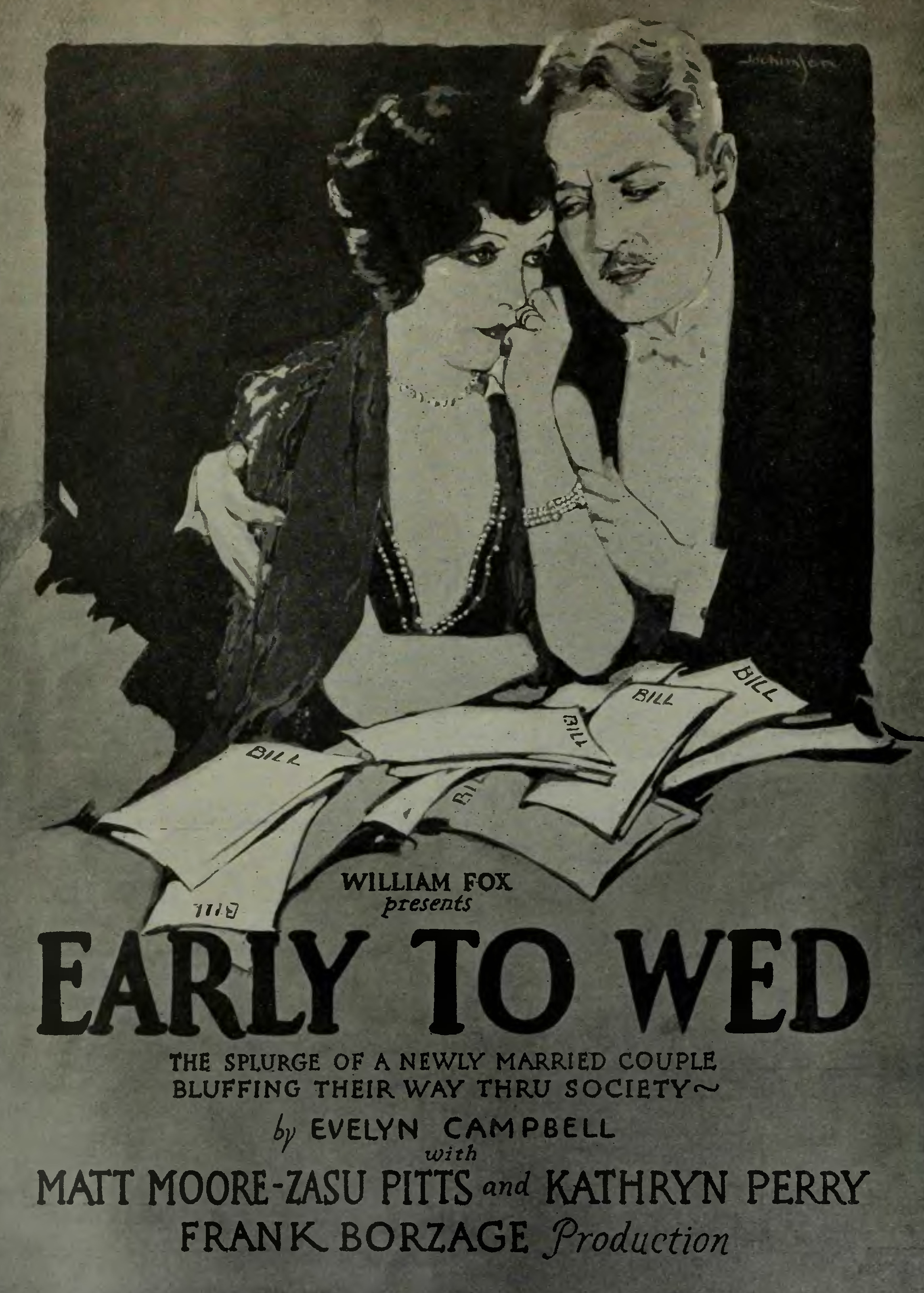
Early to Wed 1926 advertisement

Early to Wed is a 1926 American silent comedy film directed by Frank Borzage and starring Matt Moore, Katherine Perry, and Albert Gran.

== Cast ==
- Matt Moore as Tommy Carter
- Katherine Perry as Daphne Carter
- Albert Gran as Cassius Hayden
- Julia Swayne Gordon as Mrs. Hayden
- Arthur Housman as Art Nevers
- Rodney Hildebrand as Mike Dugan
- ZaSu Pitts as Mrs. Dugan
- Belva McKay as Mrs. Nevers
- Ross McCutcheon as Bill Dugan
- Harry A. Bailey as Pelton Jones

== Bibliography ==
- Solomon, Aubrey. The Fox Film Corporation, 1915-1935: A History and Filmography. McFarland, 2011. ISBN 978-0-7864-6286-5
