= Her Marriage Vow =

1924 film

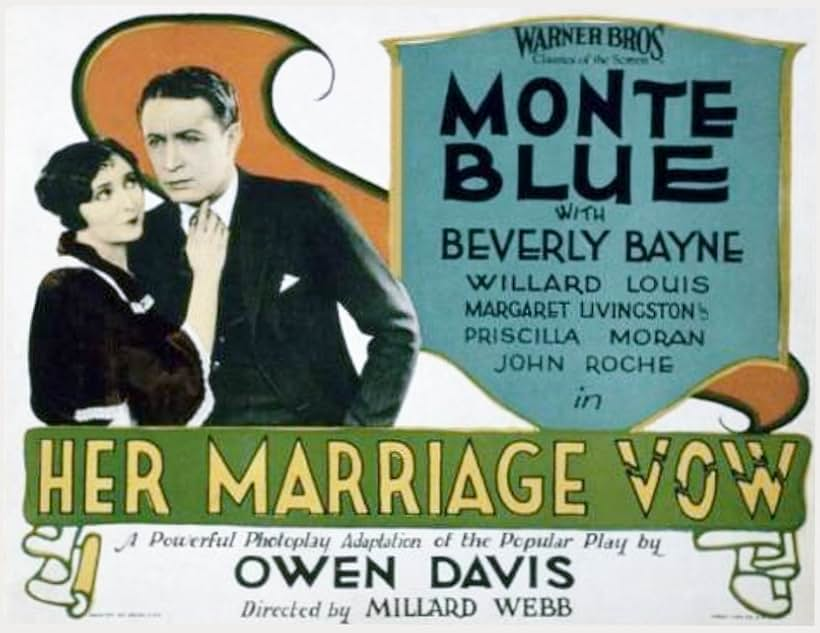
- Directed by: Millard Webb
- Screenplay by: Millard Webb
- Based on: At the Switch or Her Marriage Vow, a Play in Four Acts by Owen Davis
- Starring: Monte Blue; Willard Louis; Beverly Bayne; Margaret Livingston; John Roche; Priscilla Moran
- Production company: Warner Bros.
- Distributed by: Warner Bros.
- Release date: July 20, 1924
- Running time: 70 minutes
- Country: United States
- Language: Silent (English intertitles)
- Budget: $59,000
- Box office: $233,000

Her Marriage Vow is a 1924 American drama film written and directed by Millard Webb. The film stars Monte Blue, Willard Louis, Beverly Bayne, Margaret Livingston, John Roche and Priscilla Moran. The film was released by Warner Bros. on July 20, 1924.

== Plot ==
As described in a review in a film magazine, Carol Pelham turns down the wealthy idler, Ted Lowe, and marries a hard-working chap, Bob Hilton. For seven years their life is happy, even though Carol is kept pretty well confined to her home taking care of it and her two little girls. A flighty friend, Estelle takes an apartment in the same building and Carol again meets with Ted, who starts to make love to her. Piqued at the fact that Bob leaves her alone to work at night causes her to attend a party in Estelle's apartment where she imbibes too freely. Bob catches Ted kissing her and putting a necklace on her while she sleeps after finding roses from Ted in his own apartment. Mistrusting her, he casts her out and the court awards him the children, but he is lonely and continues to love Carol. Finally unable to stand it any longer, Carol steals into Bob's home and the children beg her to take them with her. A noise causes Bob to hear her and, stealing out on a balcony, he fires into the room. Carol is not hit, but faints, and when she revives, she and Bob become reconciled.

== Cast ==
- Monte Blue as Bob Hilton
- Willard Louis as Arthur Atherton
- Beverly Bayne as Carol Hilton
- Margaret Livingston as Estelle Winslow
- John Roche as Ted Lowe
- Priscilla Moran as Barbara
- Mary Grabhorn as Janey
- Martha Petelle as Mrs. Pelham
- Aileen Manning as Spinster
- Arthur Hoyt as Winslow
- Walter Wilkinson (uncredited)
- Betsy Ann Hisle as The Hilton Daughter (uncredited)

== Box office ==
According to Warner Bros. records, the film earned $210,000 domestically and $23,000 in foreign markets.

== Preservation status ==
A print of Her Marriage Vow is preserved in Filmarchiv Austria.
