= Up the Ladder =

1925 film

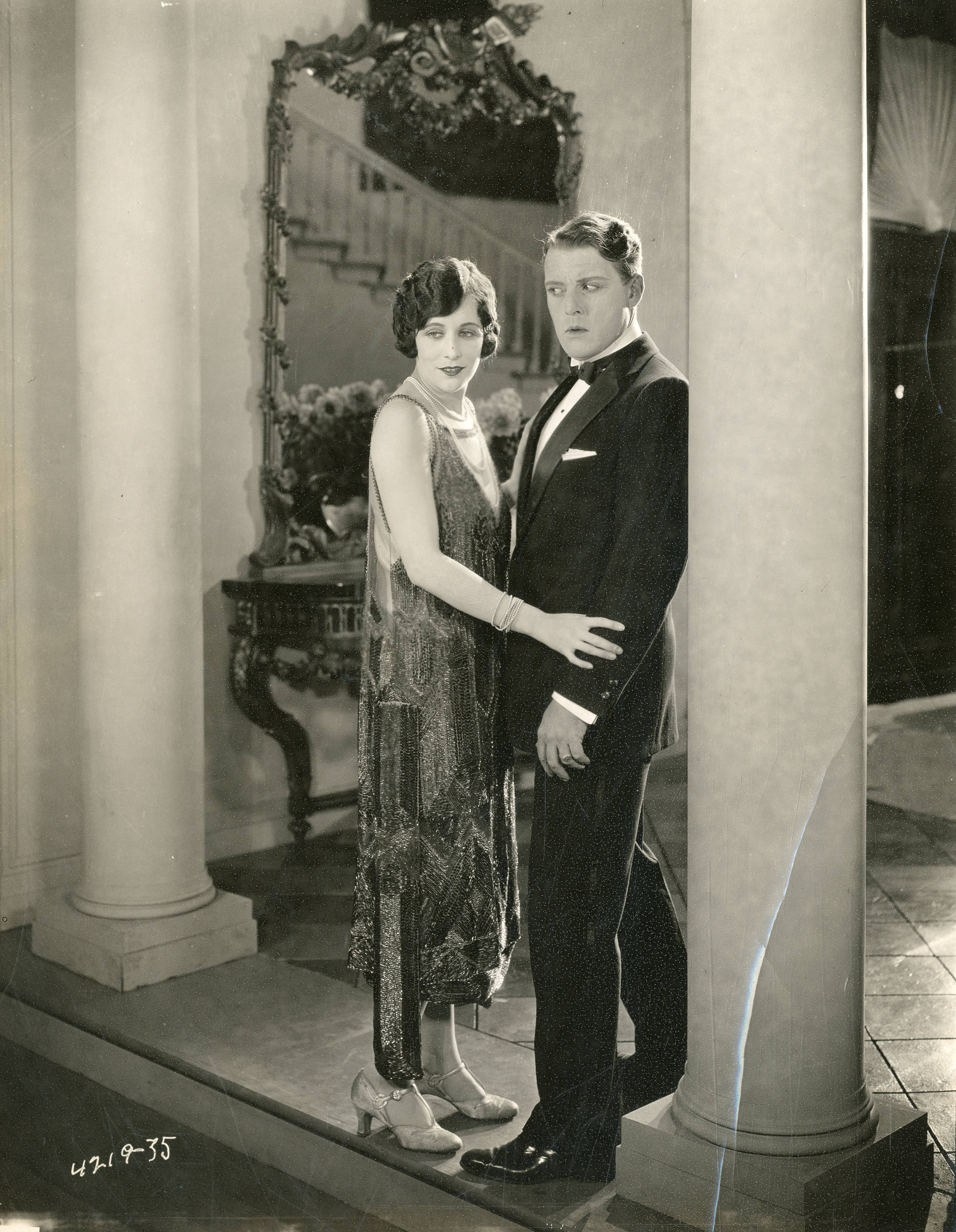
- Directed by: Edward Sloman
- Screenplay by: Tom McNamara; Grant Carpenter
- Based on: Up the Ladder by Owen Davis
- Starring: Virginia Valli; Forrest Stanley; Margaret Livingston; Holmes Herbert; Lydia Yeamans Titus; Priscilla Moran
- Cinematography: Jackson Rose
- Production company: Universal Pictures
- Distributed by: Universal Pictures
- Release date: May 3, 1925
- Running time: 70 minutes
- Country: United States
- Language: silent (English intertitles)

Up the Ladder is a 1925 American silent drama film directed by Edward Sloman, written by Tom McNamara and Grant Carpenter, and starring Virginia Valli, Forrest Stanley, Margaret Livingston, Holmes Herbert, Lydia Yeamans Titus and Priscilla Moran. Based on the 1922 play Up the Ladder by Owen Davis, the film was released on May 3, 1925, by Universal Pictures.

== Plot ==
Jane Cornwall, a young heiress who is in love with James Van Clinton, sells her estate to fund her boyfriend's research. James is able to fine-tune his invention, the Tele-vision-phone, which meets with great success so that he can marry Jane. But after five years, James begins to neglect both his wife and his job. His attention goes to Helen Newhall, his wife's best friend. Jane, aware of the report, decides not to intervene. The man is facing a new financial crisis and has to resort to Jane's money again. But his wife, at this time, takes over the company's fabrics and puts him in a subordinate position. James puts his head back: working hard, he returns to the company's head. And he reconciles with his wife.

== Cast ==
- Virginia Valli as Jane Cornwall
- Forrest Stanley as James Van Clinton
- Margaret Livingston as Helene Newhall
- Holmes Herbert as Robert Newhall
- Lydia Yeamans Titus as Hannah
- Priscilla Moran as Peggy
- William V. Mong as Richards
- George Fawcett as Judge Seymour
- Olive Ann Alcorn as Dancer
