= Matt Moore (actor) =

American actor (1888–1960)

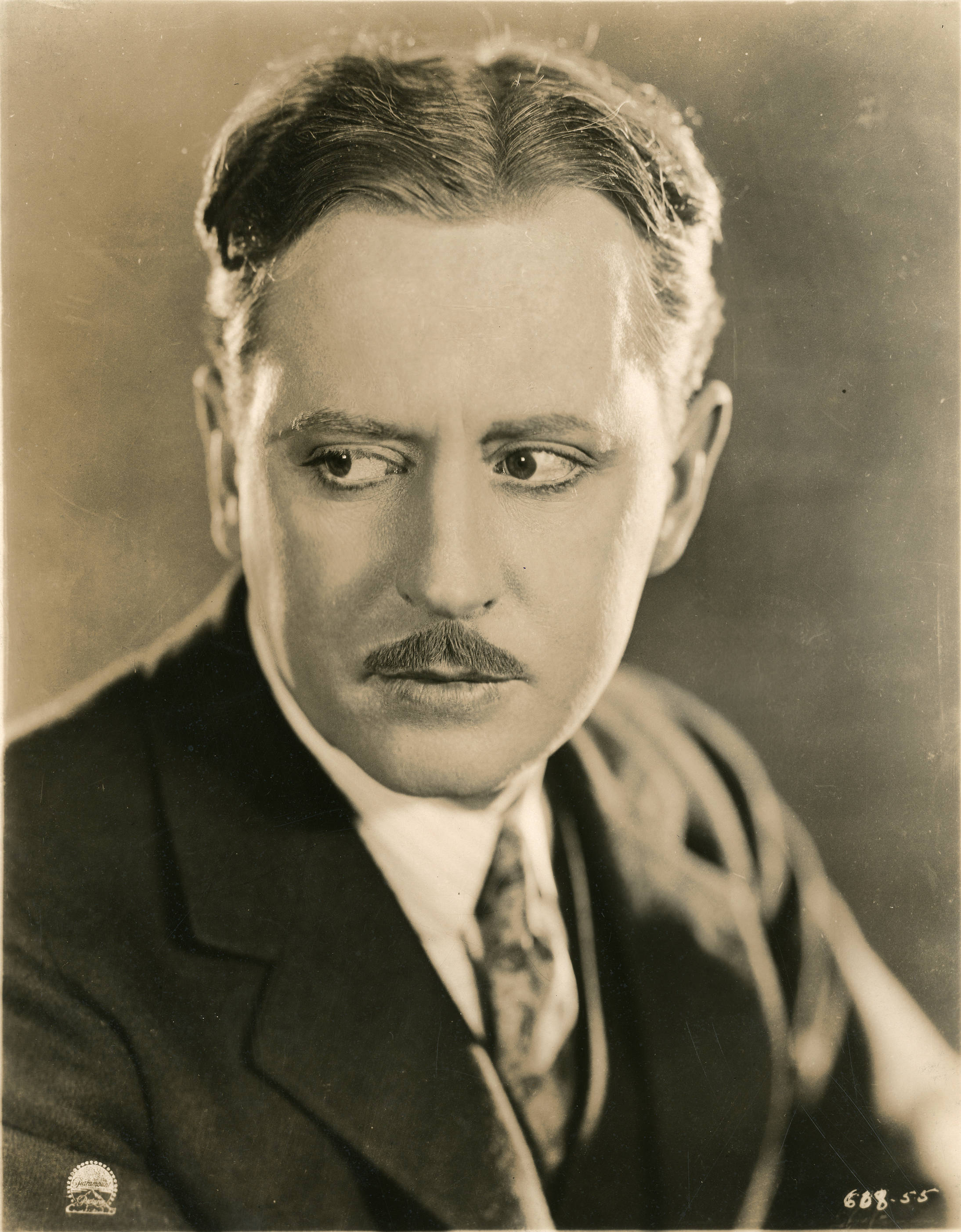
- Moore c. 1924
- Born: January 8, 1888; Fordstown Crossroads, County Meath, Ireland
- Died: January 20, 1960 (aged 72); Hollywood, Los Angeles, California, U.S.
- Occupations: Actor, film director
- Years active: 1912–1958
- Relatives: Brothers: Tom, Owen and Joe Moore

Matt Moore (January 8, 1888 – January 20, 1960) was an Irish-born American actor and director. He appeared in at least 221 motion pictures from 1912 to 1958.

== Biography ==
Born in Fordstown Crossroads, County Meath, Ireland, he and his brothers, Tom, Owen, and Joe, and a sister Mary Moore emigrated to the United States as steerage passengers on board the S.S. Anchoria and were inspected on Ellis Island in May 1896. They all went on to successful movie careers.

Once his brothers made a name for themselves, Moore made his debut in the role as the minister in the silent short Tangled Relations (1912) starring Florence Lawrence and Owen Moore. In 1913, Matt Moore had a prominent role in the "white slavery" drama, Traffic in Souls.

Moore played the role as Hector MacDonald in the MGM crime/drama The Unholy Three (1925) co-starring Lon Chaney and Mae Busch, which was a huge hit that year. He played the role as Stanley "Stan" Wentworth in Coquette (1929) opposite Mary Pickford and Johnny Mack Brown. Coquette was the first talkie of Pickford, ex-wife of his brother Owen.

As time passed, Moore took smaller character roles and remained active in the motion picture industry. His final appearance was in the uncredited role as Charlie Bates in the horror/thriller I Bury the Living (1958), which starred Richard Boone and Theodore Bikel.

Moore has a star for his work in motion pictures on the Hollywood Walk of Fame at 6301 Hollywood Boulevard. He was very fond of his two cats, having them appear in several of his movies, and both have a star in the animal section of the Hollywood Walk of Fame.

== Death ==
Moore died of undisclosed causes on January 20, 1960, in Hollywood, California, aged 72.

== Selected filmography ==
- Traffic in Souls (1913) - Officer Burke - Officer 4434
- A Singular Sinner (1914)
- 20,000 Leagues Under the Sea (1916) - Lieutenant Bond
- The Pride of the Clan (1917) - Jamie Campbell
- Runaway Romany (1917) - Bud Haskell
- Heart of the Wilds (1918) - Val Galbraith
- The Bondage of Barbara (1919) - Harry Chambers
- A Wild Goose Chase (1919)
- Getting Mary Married (1919) - Ted Barnacle
- The Unpardonable Sin (1919) - Nol Windsor
- The Unwritten Code (1919) - Dick Tower
- Sahara (1919) - John Stanley
- The Dark Star (1919) - Prince Alak
- The Glorious Lady (1919) - The Duke of Loame
- A Regular Girl (1919) - Robert King
- Don't Ever Marry (1920) - Joe Benson
- Whispers (1920) - Pat Darrick
- The Sport of Kings (1920) - Sale Kernan
- Hairpins (1920) - Rex Rossmore
- Love Madness (1920) - Lloyd Norwood
- The Passionate Pilgrim (1921) - Henry Calverly
- Straight Is the Way (1921) - 'Cat' Carter
- The Miracle of Manhattan (1921) - Larry Marshall
- A Man's Home (1921) - Arthur Lynn
- Back Pay (1922) - Jerry Newcombe
- Sisters (1922) - Peter Joyce
- The Storm (1922) - Dave Stewart
- The Jilt (1922) - George Prothero
- Minnie (1922) - newspaper man
- Drifting (1923) - Capt. Arthur Davis
- Strangers of the Night (1923) - Ambrose Applejohn
- White Tiger (1923) - Dick Longworth
- No More Women (1924) - Peter Maddox
- The Breaking Point (1924) - Judson Clark
- A Self-Made Failure (1924) - John Steele
- Fools in the Dark (1924) - Percy Schwartz / Percy Primrose
- The Wise Virgin (1924) - Bob Hanford
- Another Man's Wife (1924) - Phillip Cochran
- A Lost Lady (1924) - Neil Herbert
- The Narrow Street (1925) - Simon Haldane
- The Way of a Girl (1925) - George
- How Baxter Butted In (1925) - Henry Baxter
- Grounds for Divorce (1925) - Maurice Sorbier
- The Unholy Three (1925) - Hector McDonald
- His Majesty, Bunker Bean (1925) - Bunker Bean
- Where the Worst Begins (1925) - Donald Van Dorn
- Three Weeks in Paris (1925) - Oswald Bates
- His Jazz Bride (1926) - Dick Gregory
- The First Year (1926) - Tom Tucker
- The Caveman (1926) - Mike Smagg
- Early to Wed (1926) - Tommy Carter
- The Mystery Club (1926) - Dick Bernard
- Diplomacy (1926) - Robert Lowry
- Summer Bachelors (1926) - Walter Blakely
- The Honorable Mr. Buggs (1927, Short) - Mr. Buggs
- Tillie the Toiler (1927) - J. Cornelius MacDougall
- Married Alive (1927) - Charles Orme
- Phyllis of the Follies (1928) - Howard Decker
- Beware of Blondes (1928) - Jeffrey
- Dry Martini (1928) - Freddie Fletcher
- Coquette (1929) - Stanley Wentworth
- Side Street (1929) - John O'Farrell
- Call of the West (1930) - Lon Dixon
- The Squealer (1930) - John Sheridan
- The Front Page (1931) - Kruger
- Stout Hearts and Willing Hands (1931, Short) - Lookalike Bartender 3
- Penrod and Sam (1931) - Henry Schofield
- Consolation Marriage (1931) - The Colonel
- Cock of the Air (1932) - Terry
- Rain (1932) - Dr. Macphail
- The Pride of the Legion (1932) - Cavanaugh
- Little Orphan Annie (1932) - Dr. Griffiths
- Deluge (1933) - Tom
- All Men Are Enemies (1934) - Allerton
- Such Women Are Dangerous (1934) - George Ryan
- Anything Goes (1936) - Capt. McPhail
- Absolute Quiet (1936) - Pilot
- Bad Boy (1939) - Henchman (uncredited)
- Range War (1939) - Jim Marlow
- Santa Fe Marshal (1940) - Watchman (uncredited)
- The Trial of Mary Dugan (1941) - Bailiff (uncredited)
- My Life with Caroline (1941) - Walters
- Unexpected Uncle (1941) - Detective (uncredited)
- The Vanishing Virginian (1942) - Chas. Inglestadt (uncredited)
- Mokey (1942) - Mr. Pennington
- The Mayor of 44th Street (1942) - Jerry, Office Clerk (uncredited)
- Harrigan's Kid (1943) - Racing Judge (uncredited)
- Dr. Gillespie's Criminal Case (1943) - Harper (uncredited)
- Happy Land (1943) - Mr. Prentiss (uncredited)
- Wilson (1944) - Albert S. Burleson - Postmaster General (uncredited)
- Mrs. Parkington (1944) - Ball Guest (uncredited)
- Spellbound (1945) - Policeman at Train Station (uncredited)
- She Went to the Races (1945) - Duffy, Hilda's Trainer (uncredited)
- The Hoodlum Saint (1946) - Father Duffy
- Love Laughs at Andy Hardy (1946) - Traffic Policeman (uncredited)
- That's My Man (1947) - Bowler's Owner (uncredited)
- B.F.'s Daughter (1948) - Connecticut Mansion Butler (uncredited)
- Good Sam (1948) - Mr. Butler
- Joan of Arc (1948) - Judge Courneille (uncredited)
- Neptune's Daughter (1949) - Swim Race Official (uncredited)
- That Forsyte Woman (1949) - Timothy Forsyte
- Malaya (1949) - George - Prison Official (uncredited)
- The Reformer and the Redhead (1950) - Parkers' Butler (uncredited)
- Please Believe Me (1950) - Minor Role (uncredited)
- The Big Hangover (1950) - Mr. Rumlie
- Mystery Street (1950) - Dr. Rockton (uncredited)
- The Happy Years (1950) - Travers Family Butler (uncredited)
- Grounds for Marriage (1951) - Critic (uncredited)
- Three Guys Named Mike (1951) - Mr. Tannen (uncredited)
- Inside Straight (1951) - Broker (uncredited)
- Mr. Imperium (1951) - Gateman (uncredited)
- The Great Caruso (1951) - Matt - the Doorman (uncredited)
- Night into Morning (1951) - Prof. Joe Goodman (uncredited)
- Rich, Young and Pretty (1951) - Doctor (uncredited)
- The Law and the Lady (1951) - Senator Scholmm (uncredited)
- Too Young to Kiss (1951) - Charles, Wainwright's Butler (uncredited)
- Invitation (1952) - Paul, the Butler
- Plymouth Adventure (1952) - William Mullins (uncredited)
- Scandal at Scourie (1953) - Kenston (uncredited)
- Latin Lovers (1953) - Board Member (uncredited)
- The Great Diamond Robbery (1954) - Preacher (uncredited)
- Executive Suite (1954) - Servant (uncredited)
- Gypsy Colt (1954) - Tourist (uncredited)
- Yankee Pasha (1954) - Bearded Slave (uncredited)
- Seven Brides for Seven Brothers (1954) - Ruth's Uncle
- The Last Time I Saw Paris (1954) - Englishman (uncredited)
- The King's Thief (1955) - Gentleman (uncredited)
- The Birds and the Bees (1956) - Passenger (uncredited)
- Pardners (1956) - Cowboy (uncredited)
- These Wilder Years (1956) - Ed, the Gateman (uncredited)
- Designing Woman (1957) - Stage Doorman (uncredited)
- An Affair to Remember (1957) - Father McGrath (uncredited)
- The Helen Morgan Story (1957) - Bum (uncredited)
- I Bury the Living (1958) - Charlie Bates (uncredited) (final film role)
