= Albert Gran =

American actor

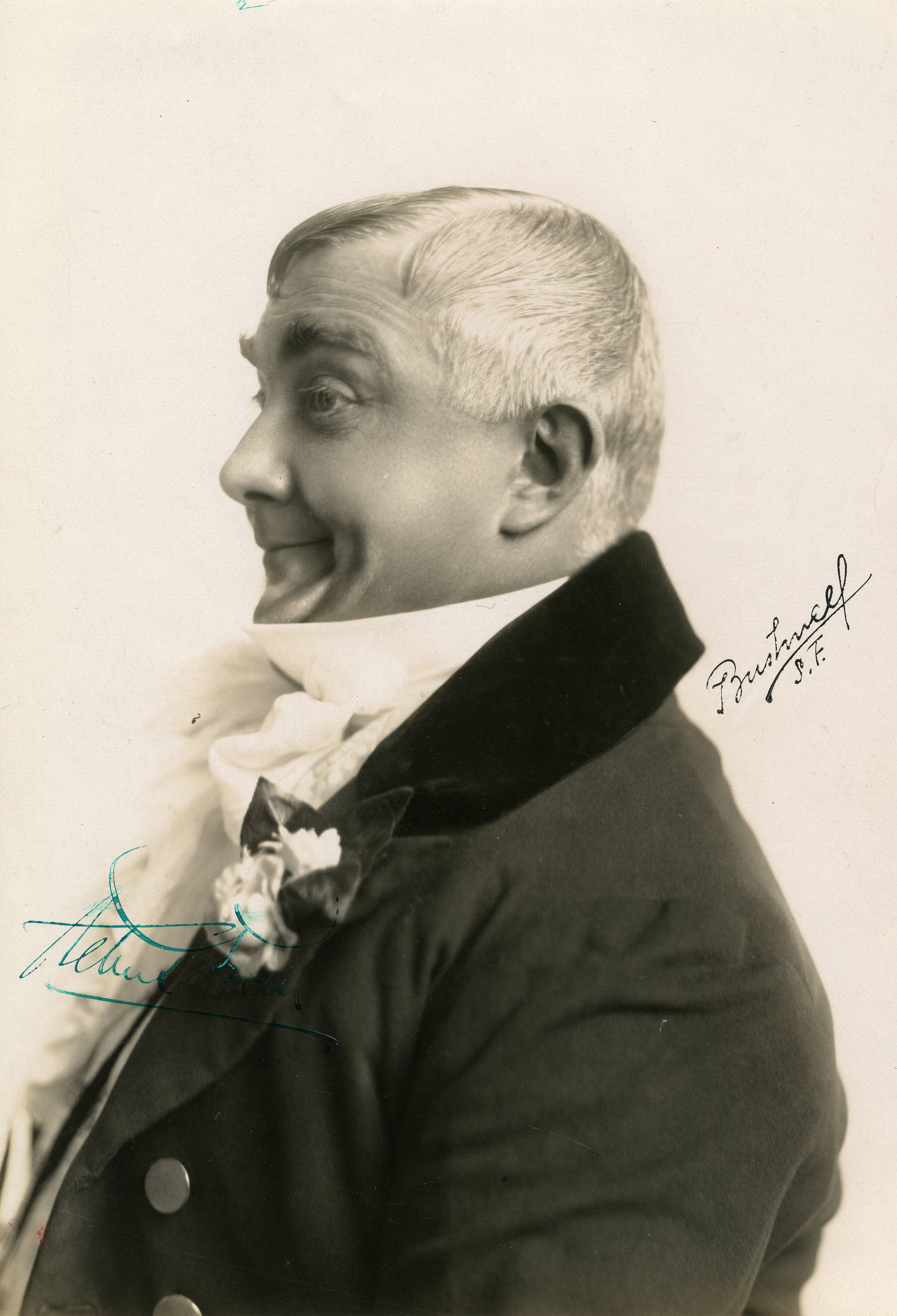
- Gran in 1912
- Born: August 4, 1862; Bergen, Norway
- Died: December 16, 1932 (aged 70); Los Angeles, California, U.S.
- Occupation: Actor
- Years active: 1916–1932

Albert Gran (August 4, 1862 – December 16, 1932) was a Norwegian-born American stage and film actor. He is most associated with his appearance in drama and light comedy films.

== Biography ==
Albert Gran was born in Bergen, Norway. He was the son of Albert Nicolai Gran (1838-1915) and Auguste Schwarting (1844-1910). He emigrated to the United States during 1914. Gran launched his screen career in 1916. He appeared as a character actor in 44 films between 1916 and 1933. He was seen as Duke Travina with Marion Davies in Beverly of Graustark (1926), as Paul Boul with Janet Gaynor in Seventh Heaven (1927), and as B. Bickering Brown with Joan Crawford in Our Modern Maidens (1929). Albert Gran died in Los Angeles, California in an automobile accident at the age of 70 prior to the release of his final film.

== Partial filmography ==
- The Fight (1915)
- Out of the Drifts (1916)
- Where Love Leads (1916)
- Caprice of the Mountains (1916)
- Civilian Clothes (1920)
- Tarnish (1924)
- Graustark (1925)
- Beverly of Graustark (1926)
- Early to Wed (1926)
- More Pay, Less Work (1926)
- Honesty – The Best Policy (1926)
- Seventh Heaven (1927)
- Breakfast at Sunrise (1927)
- Four Sons (1928)
- The Blue Danube (1928)
- Mother Knows Best (1928) Fox's first full talkie
- Dry Martini (1928)
- We Americans (1928)
- Geraldine (1929)
- Gold Diggers of Broadway (1929) as James Blake
- Our Modern Maidens (1929)
- Tanned Legs (1929)
- The Little Accident (1930)
- Follow Thru(1930) as Martin Bascomb
- The Brat (1931)
- Command Performance (1931)
- Beauty Parlor (1932)
- Employees' Entrance (1932) (Gran died in an auto accident before the film was finished and released)
