= The First Year (1926 film) =

1926 film

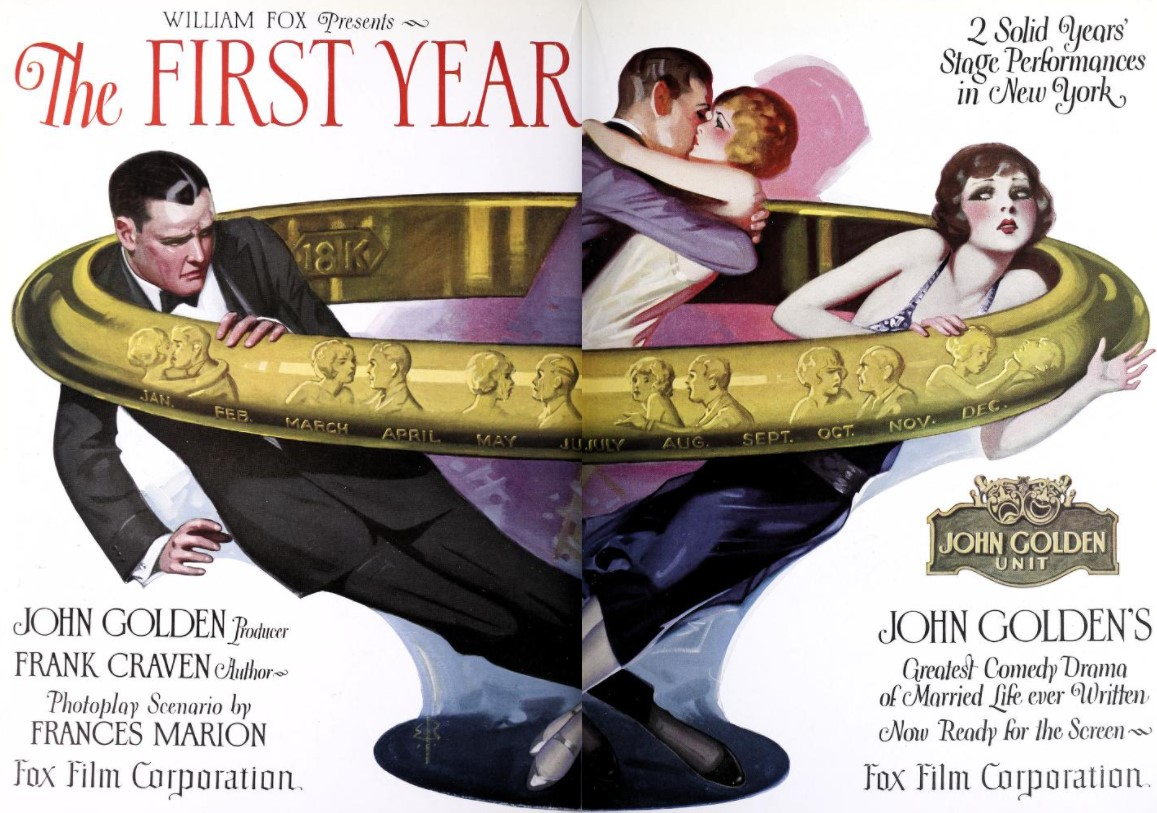
- Advertisement
- Directed by: Frank Borzage
- Written by: Frances Marion
- Based on: The First Year by Frank Craven
- Starring: Matt Moore; Katherine Perry; John Patrick; Frank Currier; Frank Cooley
- Cinematography: Chester A. Lyons
- Production company: Fox Film Corporation
- Distributed by: Fox Film Corporation
- Release date: January 24, 1926
- Running time: 75 minutes
- Country: United States
- Language: Silent (English intertitles)

The First Year is a 1926 American silent comedy film directed by Frank Borzage and starring Matt Moore, Katherine Perry, John Patrick, Frank Currier, and Frank Cooley. It is based on the 1920 play of the same name by Frank Craven. The film was released by Fox Film Corporation on January 24, 1926.

== Plot ==
As described in a film magazine review, Tom and Grace Tucker have been married a year. Grace is discontented and wishes they had more money. Tom consoles her by the promise of what he will achieve by a prospective big business deal. He invites Mr. and Mrs. Barstow to dinner and has the former all hooked up for a real estate killing. Mr. Barstow is a railroad executive while his wife is a former showgirl. However, the inexperience of their maid Hattie makes the dinner less than ideal, and the arrival of Dick Loring and a chance conversational slip by Grace threatens to spoil the deal. Grace and Tom quarrel, and she leaves to go to her mother. Tom gets drunk, but closes the deal with Mr. Barstow, follows his wife, and they are reconciled.

== Cast ==
- Matt Moore as Tom Tucker
- Katherine Perry as Grace Livingston (credited as Kathryn Perry)
- John Patrick as Dick Loring
- Frank Currier as Dr. Livingston
- Frank Cooley as Mr. Livingston
- Virginia Madison as Mrs. Livingston
- Carolynne Snowden as Hattie
- J. Farrell MacDonald as Mr. Barstow
- Margaret Livingston as Mrs. Barstow

== Preservation ==
Prints of The First Year exist at the Museum of Modern Art and the George Eastman Museum.
