= Ralph Sipperly =

American actor

Ralph Wilson Sipperly (1890–1928) was a comic and character actor who appeared in ten films (mostly silents) between 1923 and 1927. His most notable portrayal was as the barber in the Academy Award-winning film Sunrise: A Song of Two Humans (1927).

Born in Rochester, New York, Sipperly had a career in the Broadway theatre before breaking into silent films. His earliest known appearance was in a performance of A Prince There Was (1918), followed by The Meanest Man in the World (1920), Six Cylinder Love (1921), The Deep Tangled Wild-Wood (1923) and other (mostly) comedies. His first known film part was in the movie version of Six Cylinder Love (1923) in which he played the same character he had on-stage.

During one theatrical performance of Six-Cylinder Love in New York in 1921, Sipperly, who played a high-powered car salesman, accidentally drove an actual automobile off the stage and into the first row of seats. No one was injured, though screams erupted in the sold-out hall, and one woman "became hysterical" as people scrambled out of the way. The incident made The New York Times the following day, but apparently had no effect on Sipperly's career.

Another New York Times article of 1925 reported that Sipperly, "saxophonist de luxe of The Fall Guy has selected the design for the monument that is to mark the site of his Rochester birthplace. It is to consist of two baseball bats crossed above a dumbbell. It seems that baseball has been the dominant fact in this actor's life."

Sipperly died in Bangor, Maine, and is buried in that city's Mount Hope Cemetery.
