= Jalna (novel series) =

1927–1960 series by Mazo de la Roche

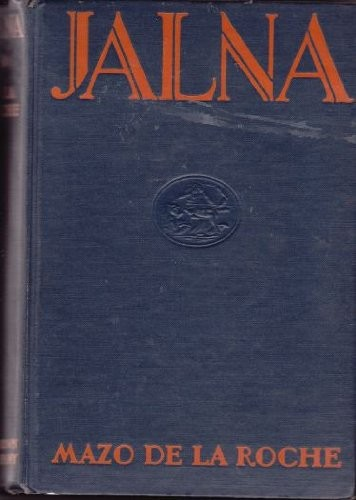
- Author: Mazo de la Roche
- Language: English
- Series: Jalna (or Whiteoaks)
- Publisher: Little, Brown and Company
- Publication date: June 1927
- Publication place: Canada
- Media type: Print
- ISBN: 0-316-18000-9

Jalna is a series of 16 novels by the Canadian writer Mazo de la Roche. It was adapted to film and two television series.

Jalna is the name of the fictional manor house in which the Whiteoak family lives. The name comes from Jalna, a city in west-central India, where there was a British garrison. In a prequel novel, the house is built by a retired officer of the British army who served in India. The house in the novels is partly based on a house called Benares in Mississauga, Canada that was built in the late 1850s for a retired officer of the British army who had served in India, James B. Harris. It once occupied a larger estate, upon which de la Roche lived for a time. "Benares" is an alternate name of Varanasi, a city in India which had a British garrison.

== The story ==
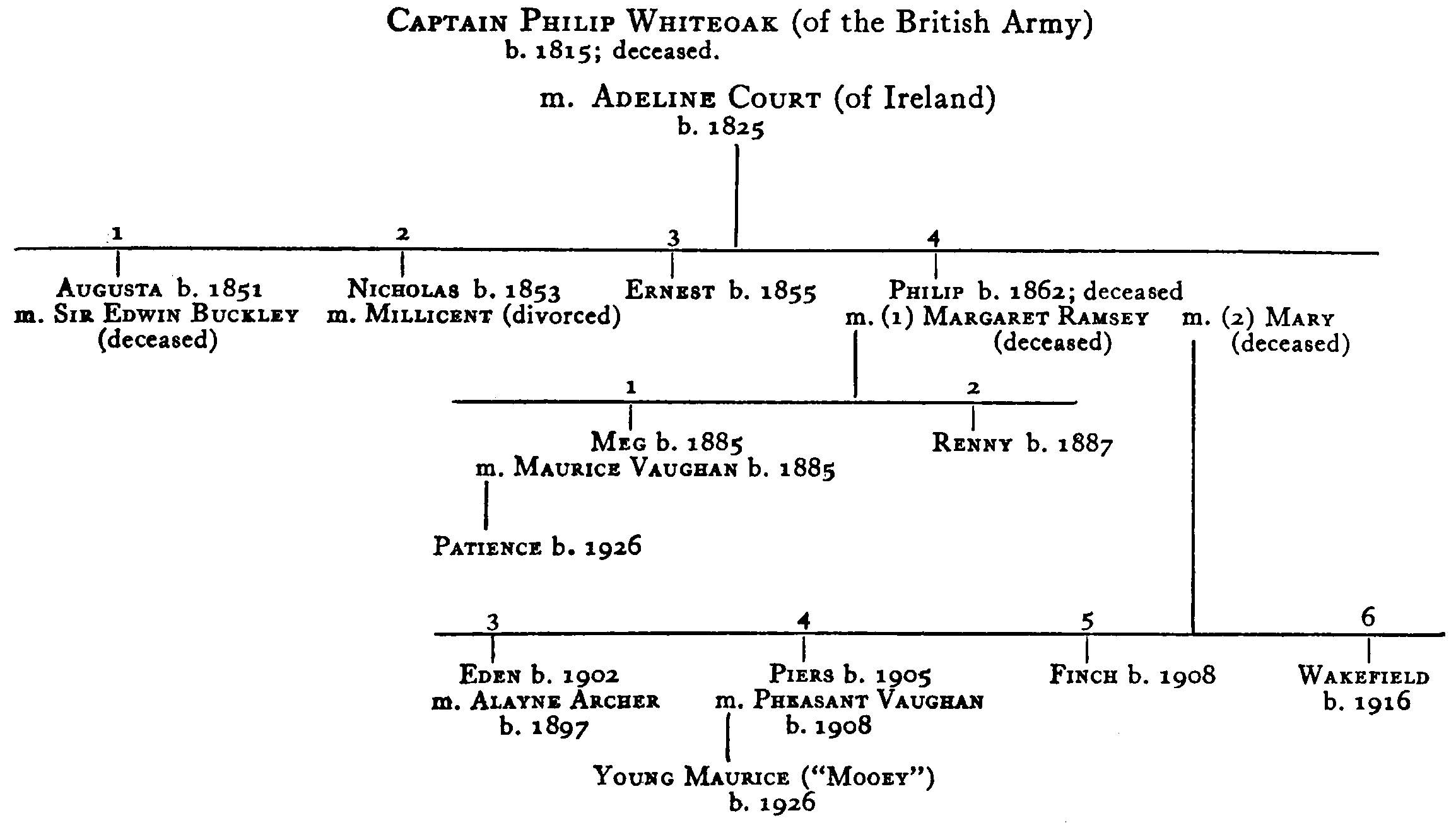
Whiteoak family genealogy as provided in Whiteoaks of Jalna (1929)

Spanning 1854 to 1954, the Jalna series tells the story of the Whiteoak family who lived on a southern Ontario estate. The novels were not written to be read in sequence; each can be read as an independent story.

There are similarities and as well as differences in the experiences of the Whiteoak family and de la Roche's. While the lives and successes of the Whiteoaks rise and fall, there remained for them the steadiness of the family manor, known as Jalna. De la Roche's family endured the illness of her mother, the perpetual job searches of her father, and the adoption of her orphaned cousin while being moved 17 times. Her family did work a farm for a few years for a wealthy man who owned the farm for a hobby. Several critics believe that Finch from Finch's Fortune (1932) is a reflection of de la Roche herself. The names of many of the characters were taken from gravestones in a Newmarket, Ontario cemetery.

== Production ==
Jalna, first published in 1927, won the Atlantic Monthly Press's first $10,000 Atlantic Prize Novel award. De la Roche went on to write about the Whiteoak family for the next 30 years, establishing a place for herself in popular Canadian literature. The Jalna series has been translated into many languages and was adapted for stage, radio, and television. John Cromwell directed the 1935 film adaptation, Jalna, released by RKO Radio Pictures. In 1972, the story was adapted for television and aired on the CBC as The Whiteoaks of Jalna.

By 1961, when de la Roche died, the series had sold more than eleven million copies in 193 English and 92 foreign editions.

== The books ==
All of the books were published by Little, Brown; Whiteoaks of Jalna was also published under the name Whiteoaks by Macmillan in 1929.

Title	Published	Set in	Notes
Jalna	1927	1924–1925	
Whiteoaks of Jalna	1929	1926–1927	
Finch's Fortune	1932	1929–1930	
The Master of Jalna	1933	1931–1932	
Young Renny	1935	1906	
Whiteoak Heritage	1935	1919	
Whiteoak Harvest	1936	1934–1935	
Wakefield's Course	1941	1939–1940	
Building of Jalna	1944	1852–1854	
Return to Jalna	1946	1943–1945	
Mary Wakefield	1949	1893–1894	
Renny's Daughter	1951	1948	
Whiteoak Brothers	1953	1923–1924	
Variable Winds at Jalna	1954	1950–1951	
Centenary at Jalna	1954	1953–1954	
Morning at Jalna	1960	1863–1864	

== Film and television adaptations ==
- Jalna, 1935, RKO Radio Pictures film
- The Whiteoak Chronicles: The Building of Jalna, 1955, BBC television Film
- The Whiteoaks of Jalna, 1972, CBC television drama miniseries
