= Oliver H. P. Garrett =

American film director, writer, newspaperman, and rifleman

- Born: May 6, 1894; New Bedford, Massachusetts, US
- Died: February 22, 1952 (aged 57); New York City, US
- Occupations: Film director, writer, newspaperman, rifleman

Oliver H. P. Garrett (May 6, 1894 – February 22, 1952) was an American film director, writer, newspaperman, and rifleman.

== Biography ==
Oliver H. P. Garrett was born in Laurens County, South Carolina.

By the fall of 1917 he was a rifleman who fought against the Germans, but he was wounded and won the Distinguished Service Cross. He interviewed Al Capone and Adolf Hitler in 1923 after the failed Pusch and in the early 1930s. He was a newspaperman for The Sun in the 1920s,. He was hired by David O. Selznick after writing the final script of Gone with the Wind (1939) because Scott Fitzgerald wanted a film of conventional length.

Garrett was a close friend and next-door neighbour to Hollywood producer Irving Thalberg. When Thalberg married movie star Norma Shearer, Oliver was the usher of the wedding.

== Career ==
He directed and wrote the screenplay for Careful, Soft Shoulder (1942). The script employs a first-person narrative and his direction is not imaginative and uses a first-person camera.

He wrote the story and dialogue for Street of Chance (1930), based on the life of the gangster Arthur Rothstein . According to Louella O. Parsons, "Oliver H. P. Garrett has written a thriling story, but even so, much of the credit must go to John Cromwell, who directed the story with finesse and with a fine regard for detail.

He wrote the story for the crime drama Her Husband Lies (1937). He wrote the screenplay and the dialogue of For the Defense (1930), and Scandal Sheet (1931). The Texan (1930) was based on an adaption of the story The Double-Eyed Deceiver. City Streets (1931), directed by Rouben Mamoulian, was adapted by Max Marcin and Garrett wrote the script. He wrote the screenplay for The Man I Married (1940). He also wrote the screenplay for Underground (1941), which was about anti-Nazi activists within Germany, who operated an underground, anti-Hitler radio station. After the release of Underground, Garrett left Hollywood and joined the Office of War Information, where he actually designed a clandestine radio station that, with the help of the Office of Strategic Services, broadcast to Italy.

== Filmography ==
- Vlucht uit de nacht (1962)
- Sealed Cargo (1951)
- Dead Reckoning (1947)
- Duel in the Sun (1946)
- Flight for Freedom (1943)
- Careful, Soft Shoulders (1942)
- Underground (1941)
- The Man I Married (1940)
- Gone with the Wind (1939)
- ...One Third of a Nation... (1939)
- The Hurricane (1937)
- Her Husband Lies (1937)
- One-Way Ticket (1935)
- She Couldn't Take It (1935)
- Manhattan Melodrama (1934)
- Night Flight (1933)
- The Story of Temple Drake (1933)
- A Farewell to Arms (1932)
- If I Had a Million (1932)
- The Man from Yesterday (1932)
- World and the Flesh (1932)
- Night Nurse (1931)
- The Vice Squad (1931)
- City Streets (1931)
- Scandal Sheet (1931)
- Moby Dick (1930)
- Three Faces East (1930)
- For the Defense (1930)
- The Texan (1930)
- Street of Chance (1930)
- Chinatown Nights (1929)
- Forgotten Faces (1928)
- Ladies of the Mob (1928)
- The Dragnet (1928)

== Bibliography ==
- Bryer, Jackson R.; Margolies, Alan; Prigozy, Ruth (March 15, 2012). F. Scott Fitzgerald: New Perspectives. University of Georgia Press. p. 296. ISBN 9780820343549.
- Neste, Dan Van (March 17, 2017). The Magnificent Heel: The Life and Films of Ricardo Cortez. BearManor Media. p. 592.
- Kear, Lynn; Rossman, John (October 23, 2012). The Complete Kay Francis Career Record: All Film, Stage, Radio and Television Appearances. McFarland Publishing. p. 295. ISBN 9781476602875.
