= Sweepings =

1933 film by John Cromwell

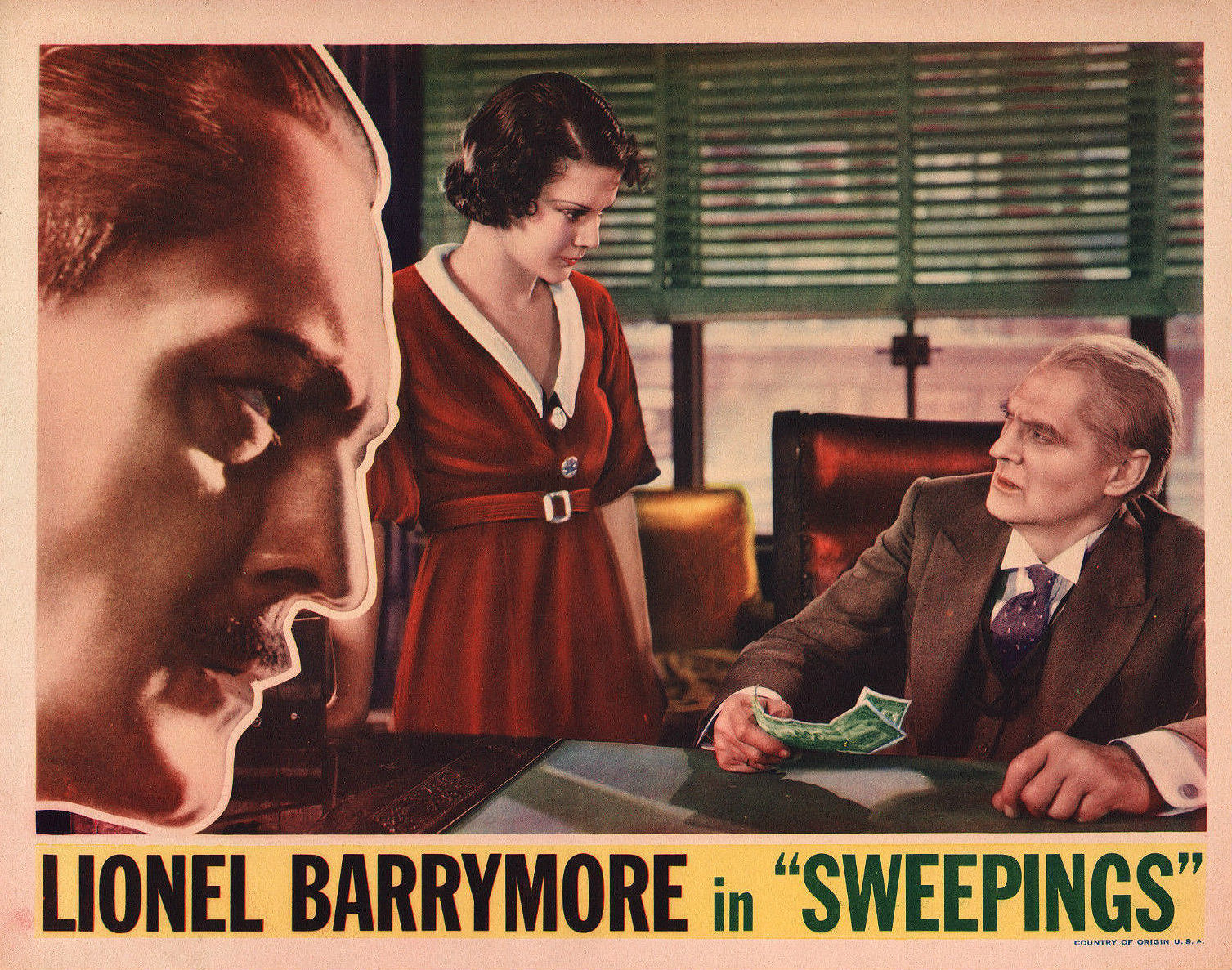
- Lobby card
- Directed by: John Cromwell
- Screenplay by: Lester Cohen
- Based on: Sweepings; 1926 novel by Lester Cohen
- Produced by: David O. Selznick
- Starring: Lionel Barrymore; Eric Linden; William Gargan; Gloria Stuart; Alan Dinehart
- Cinematography: Edward Cronjager
- Edited by: George Nicholls, Jr.
- Music by: Max Steiner
- Production company: RKO Pictures
- Distributed by: RKO Pictures
- Release date: April 14, 1933
- Running time: 80 minutes
- Country: United States
- Language: English

Sweepings is a 1933 American pre-Code drama film directed by John Cromwell, written by Lester Cohen, and starring Lionel Barrymore, Eric Linden, William Gargan, Gloria Stuart and Alan Dinehart. It was released on April 14, 1933, by RKO Pictures.

== Plot ==
Young, ambitious Daniel Pardway opens a store in Chicago called the Bazaar. Each time his wife Abigail gives birth, he adds a department to his store, dreaming of eventually putting his grown child in charge of that department. After the birth of his fourth offspring, he is left widowed. He raises his three sons and one daughter the best he can, denying them nothing. Meanwhile, his business grows into a huge department store.

General manager Abe Ullman has been with Pardway since the beginning and devoted himself completely to the store, so much so that he is unmarried and alone. One day, he asks Pardway for a share of the business, but Daniel refuses. He wants it all to go to his children.

When they are all adults, he turns to each of his sons in turn (he dismisses his daughter because she is a girl), but all of them prove unwilling or unable to manage the store. Gene, the eldest, prefers to be a playboy, drinking and keeping a mistress. Bert, next in age, dutifully accepts the position of assistant general manager, but is a plodder. Eventually, he tells his father he is happier as a window dresser, so Daniel lets him do that job. Freddie, the youngest, seduces one of the Bazaar saleswomen; Daniel has to pay her off to keep silent. (Freddie eventually leaves and wanders the world as a hobo.) Nevertheless, after incorporating the store, Daniel gives all four a tenth share of the business.

Aging, Daniel tells Abe that his job is secure as long as he is alive, but once his children inherit the store, he will be out. A resentful Abe then tells him that he secretly bought the shares of two of Daniel's offspring.

When Daniel is on his deathbed, his sons and daughter are summoned. Daniel tells them he is disappointed in all of them, and that if they do not prove worthy within six months, he is leaving his majority share to Abe. After Daniel dies, Freddie promises to try.

== Cast ==
- Lionel Barrymore as Daniel Pardway
- William Gargan as Gene Pardway, 1st child, 1st son
- Gloria Stuart as Phoebe Pardway, 2nd child, only daughter
- George Meeker as Bert Pardway, 3rd child, 2nd son
- Eric Linden as Freddie Pardway, 4th child, 3rd son
- Ninetta Sunderland as Abigail Pardway, Daniel's wife
- Alan Dinehart as Thane Pardway, Daniel's brother
- Gregory Ratoff as Abe Ullman, general manager
- Helen Mack as Mamie Donahue
- Lucien Littlefield as Grimson
- Esther Muir as Violet
- Franklin Pangborn Photographer (uncredited)

=== Connection to real people ===
The Daniel Pardway character is based on Marshall Field, American founder of the Chicago-based department store chain.
