= Break of Hearts =

1935 film by Philip Moeller

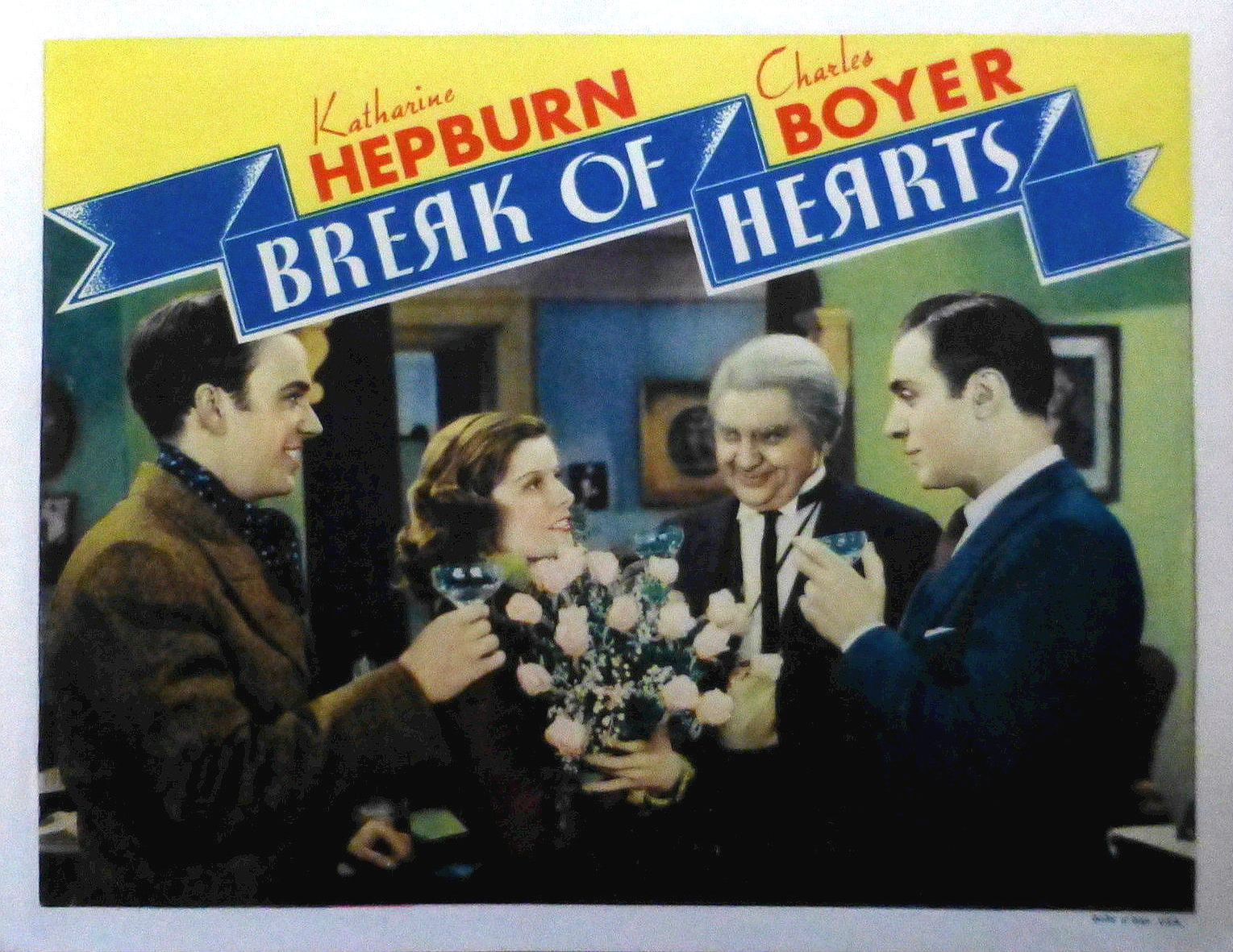
- Lobby card
- Directed by: Philip Moeller
- Written by: Lester Cohen (story); Victor Heerman; Sarah Y. Mason; Victor Heerman
- Produced by: Pandro S. Berman
- Starring: Katharine Hepburn; Charles Boyer; John Beal; Jean Hersholt
- Cinematography: Robert De Grasse
- Edited by: William Hamilton
- Music by: Max Steiner
- Production company: RKO Radio Pictures
- Distributed by: RKO Radio Pictures
- Release date: May 31, 1935
- Running time: 78 minutes
- Country: United States
- Language: English
- Budget: $427,000
- Box office: $695,000

Break of Hearts is a 1935 RKO romantic-drama film starring Katharine Hepburn and Charles Boyer. The screenplay was written by the team of Sarah Y. Mason and Victor Heerman, with Anthony Veiller, from a story by Lester Cohen, specifically for Hepburn.

Originally Break of Hearts was intended as a vehicle for Hepburn and John Barrymore. The film was promoted by RKO's advertising department with the catch phrase: "The star of a million moods together with the new idol of the screen." (Francis Lederer actually was first signed-up lead, but the producers replaced him with Charles Boyer.)

== Plot ==
Franz Roberti is an eminent musical conductor; Constance Dane is an aspiring but unknown composer. She wants to see his concert, but it is all sold out. When she sneaks into his rehearsal he is impressed by her dedication and has his orchestra play exclusively for her. Constance marries Franz: he says she is "a most exciting creature" and she has been in love with him for a long time.

Not long after they get married Constance finds Franz having dinner with a female friend. So Constance responds by going out with her own friend, Johnny Lawrence. Johnny wants to marry Constance, but she cannot forget her husband. Franz has been hitting the bottle and pretty much throwing away his career, although exactly which of his many sins is driving him to drink is not really clear. Fortunately, Constance has been working on her concerto.

Constance grows bitter at Franz's drinking and apparent infidelity, and tells him at a New Year's Eve party that she has learned from him and plans to live it up too. She is clearly not really enjoying dancing with other men, but Franz loses it and shows up late and drunk for a concert. He collapses on the podium as the orchestra tries to play a Bach piece with his increasingly erratic guidance; Constance, in the audience, is overcome by pity and rushes to his dressing room, but he furiously invites all the other men there to socialize with her, and walks out.

Constance goes to Reno and gets a divorce. Johnny shows up on the train on the way back, and proposes to her, accepting the fact that she does not love him but only likes him. She accepts, and they plan to sail to Europe for a honeymoon. But Franz and Constance's friend Professor Thalma tells Constance about Franz being down and out. She goes to the bar where he is collapsed, and brings him back to consciousness by playing the music they shared on the bar piano. She takes him home and gets medical attention for him, and, when Johnny comes, tells him nothing, including her own music, is as important as caring for Franz. Johnny sadly accepts this and goes.

Later, a revived and healthy Franz triumphantly finishes conducting Wagner's Meistersinger overture, with Constance watching him from the wings. When he walks off stage and embraces her, he tells her the applause they can hear from the audience is really hers.

== Cast ==
- Katharine Hepburn as Constance Dane Roberti
- Charles Boyer as Franz Roberti
- John Beal as Johnny Lawrence
- Jean Hersholt as Professor Thalma
- Sam Hardy as Marx
- Inez Courtney as Miss Wilson
- Helene Millard as Sylvia DeWitt
- Ferdinand Gottschalk as Enrico Pazzini
- Susan Fleming as Elise
- Lee Kohlmar as Schubert
- Jean Howard as Didi Smith-Lennox
- Anne Grey as Lady Phyllis Cameron

== Reception ==
Writing for The Spectator, Graham Greene praised the acting of Boyer and Hepburn which he described as "talented enough to keep some of our interest even in a story of this kind". Concerning Hepburn in particular, Greene observed she "always makes her young women quite horrifyingly lifelike with their girlish intuitions, their intensity, their ideals which destroy the edge of human pleasure".

This film made a slim profit of $16,000.
