= Spitfire (1934 film) =

1934 film by John Cromwell

- movie poster
- Directed by: John Cromwell
- Screenplay by: Lula Vollmer; Jane Murfin
- Based on: Trigger; 1927 play by Lula Vollmer
- Produced by: Pandro S. Berman
- Starring: Katharine Hepburn; Robert Young; Ralph Bellamy; Martha Sleeper
- Cinematography: Edward Cronjager
- Edited by: William Morgan
- Music by: Bernhard Kaun
- Release date: March 30, 1934
- Running time: 87 minutes
- Country: United States
- Language: English
- Budget: $223,000
- Box office: $604,000

Spitfire is a 1934 American pre-Code drama film based on the play Trigger by Lula Vollmer. It was directed by John Cromwell and starred Katharine Hepburn, Robert Young and Ralph Bellamy.

== Plot ==
Two engineers building a dam in the mountains, John Stafford and George Fleetwood, are attracted to local hillbilly "spitfire" Trigger Hicks who is the local faith healer. Things come to a head when the locals think that she is a witch.

== Cast ==
- Katharine Hepburn as Trigger Hicks
- Robert Young as John Stafford
- Ralph Bellamy as George Fleetwood
- Martha Sleeper as Eleanor Stafford
- Louis Mason as Bill Grayson
- Sara Haden (as Sarah Haden) as Etta Dawson
- Virginia Howell as Granny Raines
- Sidney Toler as Jim Sawyer
- Will Geer (as High Ghere) as West Fry
- John Beck as Jake Hawkins
- Therese Wittler as Mrs. Jim Sawyer

== Reception ==
The film was popular and (after cinema circuits deducted their exhibition percentage of box office ticket sales) made a profit of $113,000.
