= City Streets (1931 film) =

1931 film

- Theatrical release poster
- Directed by: Rouben Mamoulian
- Written by: Oliver H.P. Garrett; Max Marcin (adaptation)
- Story by: Dashiell Hammett
- Produced by: E. Lloyd Sheldon
- Starring: Gary Cooper; Sylvia Sidney; Paul Lukas
- Cinematography: Lee Garmes
- Edited by: William Shea
- Production company: Paramount Pictures
- Distributed by: Paramount Pictures
- Release date: April 18, 1931 (USA)
- Running time: 83 minutes
- Country: United States
- Language: English

City Streets is a 1931 American Pre-Code romantic melodrama directed by Rouben Mamoulian from a story by Dashiell Hammett and stars Gary Cooper, Sylvia Sidney and Paul Lukas.

The story concerns a racketeer's daughter, Nan, who is in love with a shooting gallery showman, who is known as The Kid. Despite her prodding, The Kid has no ambitions about joining the rackets and making enough money to support her in the lifestyle to which she is accustomed. Her father implicates her in a murder, and she is sent to prison. Her father then convinces The Kid to join the gang to free Nan.

In 2008, the American Film Institute nominated this film for its Top 10 Gangster Films list.

== Plot ==
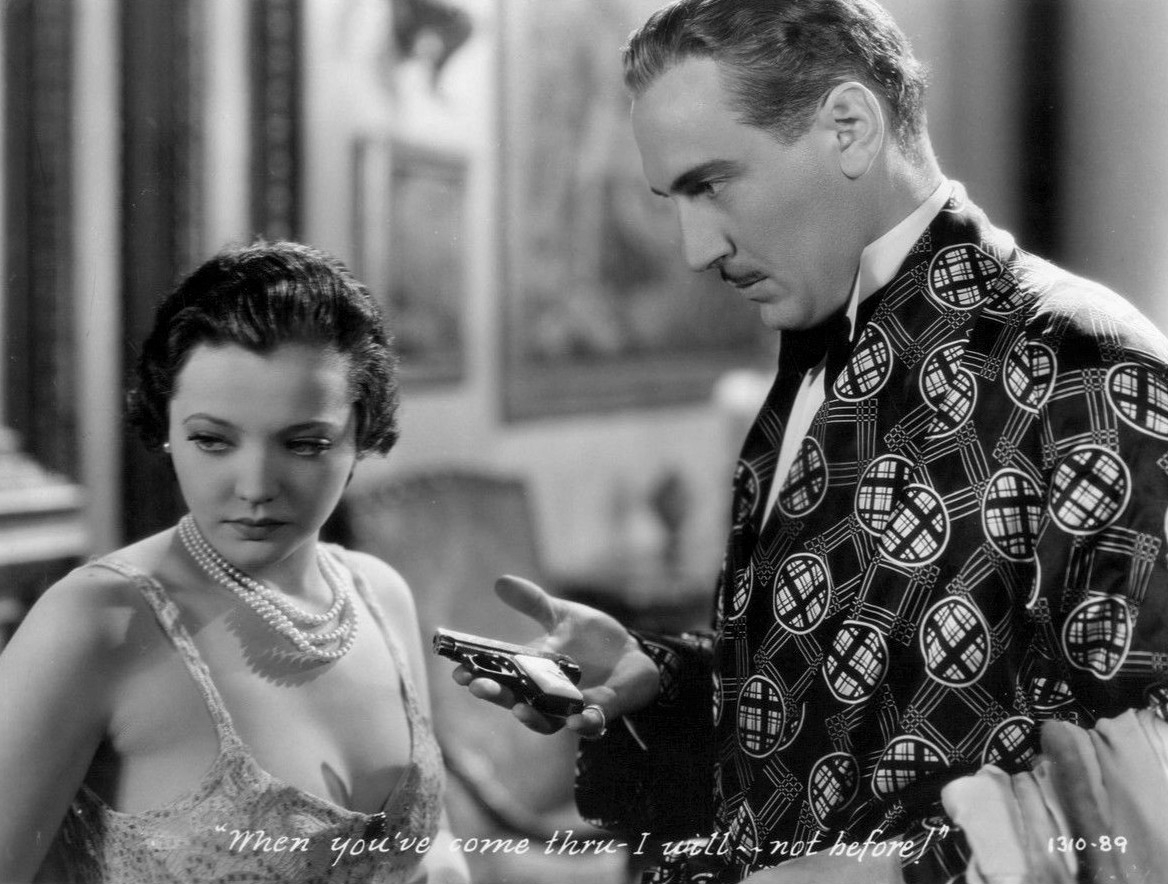
Sylvia Sidney and Paul Lukas in a scene from the film.

Nan Cooley, the daughter of racketeer Pop Cooley, is in love with The Kid, a shooting gallery showman. Cooley tries but fails to urge him to join the gang to earn enough money to support her in the lifestyle to which she is accustomed. Soon, her father kills the bootlegging chief Blackie at the urging of Big Fella Maskal since Blackie was against Maskal's involvement with Blackie's gun moll Aggie.

After Pop shoots Blackie, he passes the gun to Nan, which implicates her in the murder. She naively takes the rap since she believes the mob will arrange for her acquittal, but she is sent to prison. Pop Cooley tries to convince The Kid to join the gang to free Nan, which he does out of love for her. However, her attitude had changed since she was railroaded to prison. When The Kid visits Nan in prison in a fur coat, she becomes terrified of his involvement with Pop's gang after she witnesses a fellow inmate's mobster boyfriend being gunned down outside the prison gate. When Nan is released, having served her term, she wants nothing more to do with the mob. She tries to persuade The Kid to quit the gang, but he refuses.

Things go downhill from there. She finds that her father is unrepentant and involved with a loose, gold-digging woman named Pansy. Maskal soon takes a strong liking to Nan, throws her a homecoming party, and forces her to dance with him all evening. When The Kid finally asserts his claim over Nan, Maskal threatens him and sends his thugs to kill him, but The Kid successfully disarms them and goes after Maskal.

Terrified that her lover will be killed, Nan goes to Maskal to warn him and offers herself to him in exchange for The Kid's life. Aggie, now Maskal's mistress, shoots him with Nan's gun after he leaves her for Nan, and Nan is accused of murder. The Kid then names himself as mob chief and escapes with Nan in a car with three of Maskal's men, but they aim to kill him. The Kid and Nan are then taken "for a ride" by rival thugs. They race a train and maintain high speeds. Nan pulls a gun on the men and disarms them. Dropping the thugs off with "no hard feelings," The Kid tells them he has quit the beer business and drives off with Nan.

== Cast (in credits order) ==
- Gary Cooper as The Kid
- Sylvia Sidney as Nan Cooley
- Paul Lukas as Big Fellow Maskal
- William "Stage" Boyd as McCoy
- Wynne Gibson as Aggie
- Guy Kibbee as Pop Cooley
- Stanley Fields as Blackie
- Betty Sinclair as Pansy
- Robert Homans as Police Inspector

== Production ==
Crime writer Dashiell Hammett, under contract to Paramount, wrote a short plot outline entitled "After School" about a girl of 16 who collaborates in crime with her bootlegger stepfather and is sent briefly to reform school. Her teenage boyfriend is enlisted in the operations, and she helps to exonerate him from a murder allegation. By late 1930 a screenplay was completed, the protagonists had been re-characterized as young adults. Gary Cooper was enlisted to play "The Kid" and Clara Bow to play "Nan." Screenwriters Oliver H. P. Garrett and Max Marcin transformed Hammett's light "slice of life tale into "a modern-day morality play about the hard lives of the underclass," in which their futures hang in the balance between "spiritual ascendancy" and "mortal sin."

Filmmaker Rouben Mamoulian, who had recently completed a one-contract picture Applause (1929) for Paramount was invited to direct by producer B. P. Schulberg.

Mamoulian, to evade studio artistic control, refrained from making any explicit alterations to the Garrett/Marin scenario in advance of filming. Rather, he introduced technical and aesthetic changes during the course of filming without formal authorization.

Late in pre-production, Clara Bow experienced "a much publicized nervous breakdown" and was replaced by Sylvia Sydney. According to John Douglas Eames, in his 1985 history, The Paramount Story, it was a case of one of production-head B.P. Schulberg's protegés replacing another, "and a greater contrast could hardly be imagined." "The sad-eyed Sylvia, with her flower-like beauty and understated emotionalism, made a different kind of impact" than "the ebullient Clara," and "one that made her an instant star."

=== Technical and aesthetic innovations ===
Film historian Marc Spergel reports that City Streets was the first film to demonstrate the use of "voice-over" in a sound production. A startling visual and sound montage for its day, Mamoulian recorded two separate sound channels on a single segment of film to create the effect. The voice The Kid (Gary Cooper) is heard speaking when the screen shows only Nan's (Sylvia Sydney) face, in a sense superimposing Cooper's spoken thoughts on that of Sydney's as a dramatic device, a form of "subjective sound."

Paramount publicity personnel warned that audiences would be disconcerted by hearing a character speak without seeing the actor's lips moving. Mamoulian insisted that viewers would instantly integrate and sound and visual elements, which in fact they did.

Mamoulian also enlisted 19th century European musical classics in an effort to deepen the impact of his cinematography. Rejecting any ersatz facsimiles of grand symphonic recordings, Mamoulian insisted on having genuine masterpieces as musical embellishments. Spergel points out that Hollywood executives were pleased to see "high art" appropriated so as to add luster to their productions. The result was the "rechanneling" of art into commercial endeavors. As such "Mamoulian unwittingly contributed to the debasement of high art" by placing it at the service of his commercial cinema.

== Reception ==
The New York Times observes that director Rouben Mamoulian "photographic artistry' trades character and narrative development for "clever cinematic ideas" manifested in "unusual camera stunts and angles" and not without "photographic artistry." The reviewer finds the actors generally appealing, but regrets the "hapless casting" of Paul Lukas as Big Boy Maskal.

== Theme ==
Film historian Tom Milne distinguishes City Streets from contemporary films of the violent gangster genre of the Thirties such as the Little Caesar (1930), The Public Enemy (1931), and Scarface (1932). Though the story involves bootlegging and power struggles among mobsters, the stylized treatment of the topic resembles Paramount's 1927 silent classic "fantasy" Underworld by director Josef von Sternberg. Nowhere in City Streets does a Thompson machine gun appear nor do any gangland-style murders occur. Like Underworld, the film is essentially a love story.

Mamoulian prided himself on the fact that he avoided any explicit on-screen violence in City Streets. Film historian Mark Spergel reports that notorious Chicago mobster Al Capone saw the film and was favorably impressed.

Thematically "a modern-day morality play." the protagonists The Kid and Nan are faced with a choice: They can succumb to the savage impulses of greed and lust, or assert their better nature as individuals and rise above a degenerate society: "the country, to which they flee at the end, represents the world of nature, harmony, and hope."

== Relation to film noir ==
While acknowledging City Streets is essentially "a stylish gangster film" and its 1931 release date puts it well before the usual time frame of classic film noir, Carl Macek, writing in Film Noir: An Encyclopedic Reference to the American Style, feels its "iconography and visual symbols" nonetheless give it a high place in the genre's canon. "Mamoulian's films almost always displayed a stunning visual style, and City Streets is no exception. Heavy chiaroscuro lighting and the dark milieu of the underworld reinforce the noir attitude of Hammett's expert characaterizations."
