= Scandal Sheet (1931 film) =

1931 film

- Theatrical release poster
- Directed by: John Cromwell
- Screenplay by: Oliver H.P. Garrett; Vincent Lawrence; Max Marcin
- Starring: George Bancroft; Kay Francis; Clive Brook; Regis Toomey; Lucien Littlefield; Gilbert Emery; Harry Beresford
- Cinematography: David Abel
- Edited by: George Nichols Jr.
- Music by: Karl Hajos; W. Franke Harling
- Production company: Paramount Pictures
- Distributed by: Paramount Pictures
- Release date: January 31, 1931
- Running time: 77 minutes
- Country: United States
- Language: English

Scandal Sheet is a 1931 American pre-Code crime film directed by John Cromwell and written by Oliver H.P. Garrett, Vincent Lawrence and Max Marcin. The film stars George Bancroft, Kay Francis, Clive Brook, Regis Toomey, Lucien Littlefield, Gilbert Emery and Harry Beresford. The film was released on January 31, 1931, by Paramount Pictures.

== Plot ==
Newspaper editor Mark Flint cares about only two things, reporting a big story, no matter whose life it adversely affects, and Edith, his wife. He is unaware that Edith, bored by him, has been having a romantic affair with Noel Adams, a banker.

Adams gives a 24-hour deadline to Edith to leave her husband or end the affair. He books passage on a steamship and packs his bags. But after a crisis develops that could ruin his bank, Flint finds out, confronts Adams and, seeing his luggage, mistakenly believes Adams is fleeing the country. He prints the story without giving Adams a chance to manage the crisis at the bank.

Although his journalistic coups please Franklin, the newspaper's owner, Flint is asked by Franklin if he would be willing to publish a photograph that would hurt a colleague. Flint says yes, whereupon Franklin shows him a picture of his wife and Adams together. An enraged Flint murders Adams, turns himself in and is sentenced to Sing Sing, where he ends up running the prison's newspaper.

== Cast ==
- George Bancroft as Mark Flint
- Kay Francis as Edith Flint
- Clive Brook as Noel Adams
- Regis Toomey as Regan
- Lucien Littlefield as Charles McCloskey
- Gilbert Emery as Franklin
- Harry Beresford as Egbert Bertram Arnold
- Mary Foy as Mrs. Wilson
- Jackie Searl as Little Wilson Boy
- Fred Kelsey as Detective Sgt. Vincent Molloy
