= Unfaithful (1931 film) =

1931 film

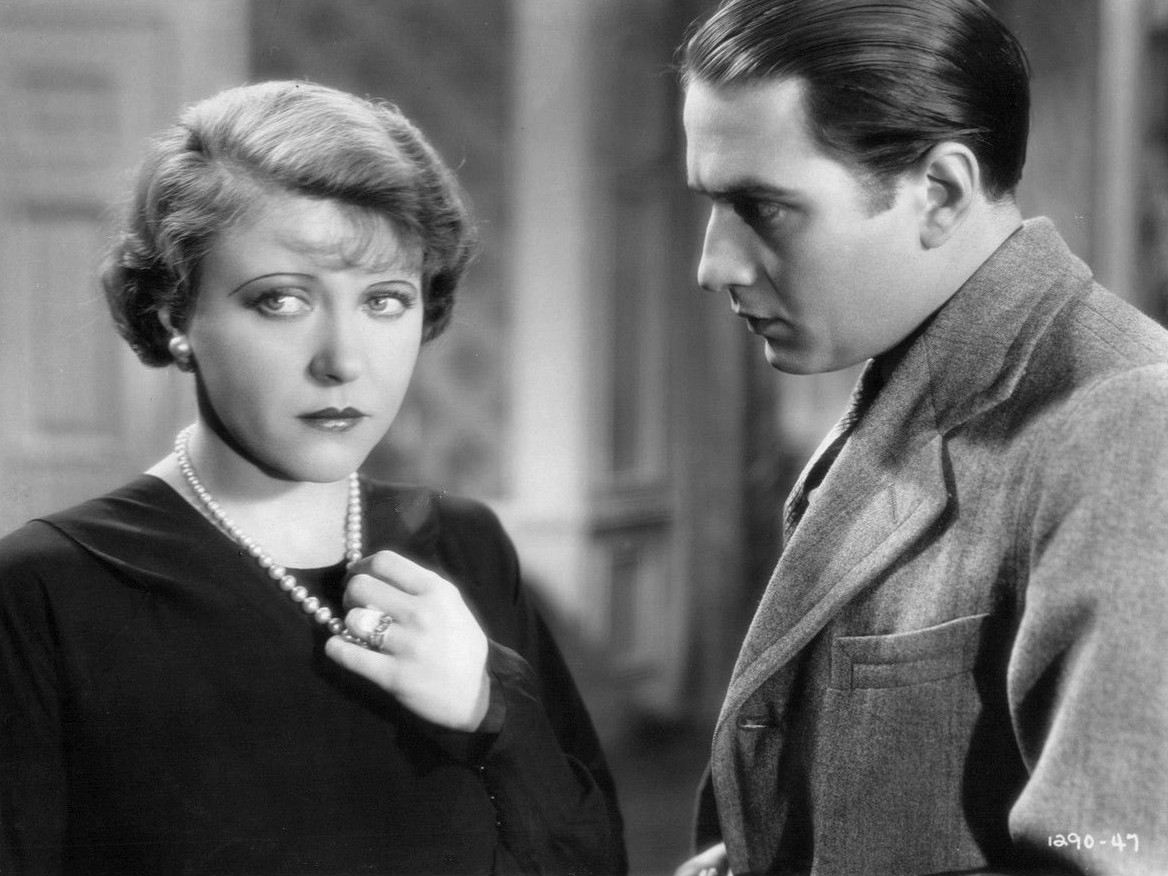
- Still with Ruth Chatterton and Donald Cook
- Directed by: John Cromwell
- Screenplay by: Eve Unsell; John Van Druten
- Starring: Ruth Chatterton; Paul Lukas; Paul Cavanagh; Juliette Compton; Donald Cook; Emily Fitzroy
- Cinematography: Charles Lang
- Music by: Karl Hajos
- Production company: Paramount Pictures
- Distributed by: Paramount Pictures
- Release date: March 14, 1931
- Running time: 85 minutes
- Country: United States
- Language: English

Unfaithful is a 1931 American Pre-Code drama film directed by John Cromwell, written by Eve Unsell and John Van Druten, and starring Ruth Chatterton, Paul Lukas, Paul Cavanagh, Juliette Compton, Donald Cook and Emily Fitzroy. It was released on March 14, 1931, by Paramount Pictures.

== Plot ==
“A woman sacrifices her good name to save her brother from being disillusioned by his wife's unfaithfulness.”

== Cast ==
- Ruth Chatterton as Lady Fay Kilkerry
- Paul Lukas as Colin Graham
- Paul Cavanagh as Ronald Killkerry
- Juliette Compton as Gemma Houston
- Donald Cook as Terry Houston
- Emily Fitzroy as Auntie Janie
- Leslie Palmer as Jeffries
- Syd Saylor as Buck
- Bruce Warren as Steve
- Arnold Lucy as Bishop
- David Cavendish as Gerald
- Ambrose Barker as Tinker
- Stella Moore as Iris
- George Jackson as Count Carini
- Douglas Gilmore as A Drunk
- Jack Richardson as Armstrong
