= Eden Gray =

American actress and writer

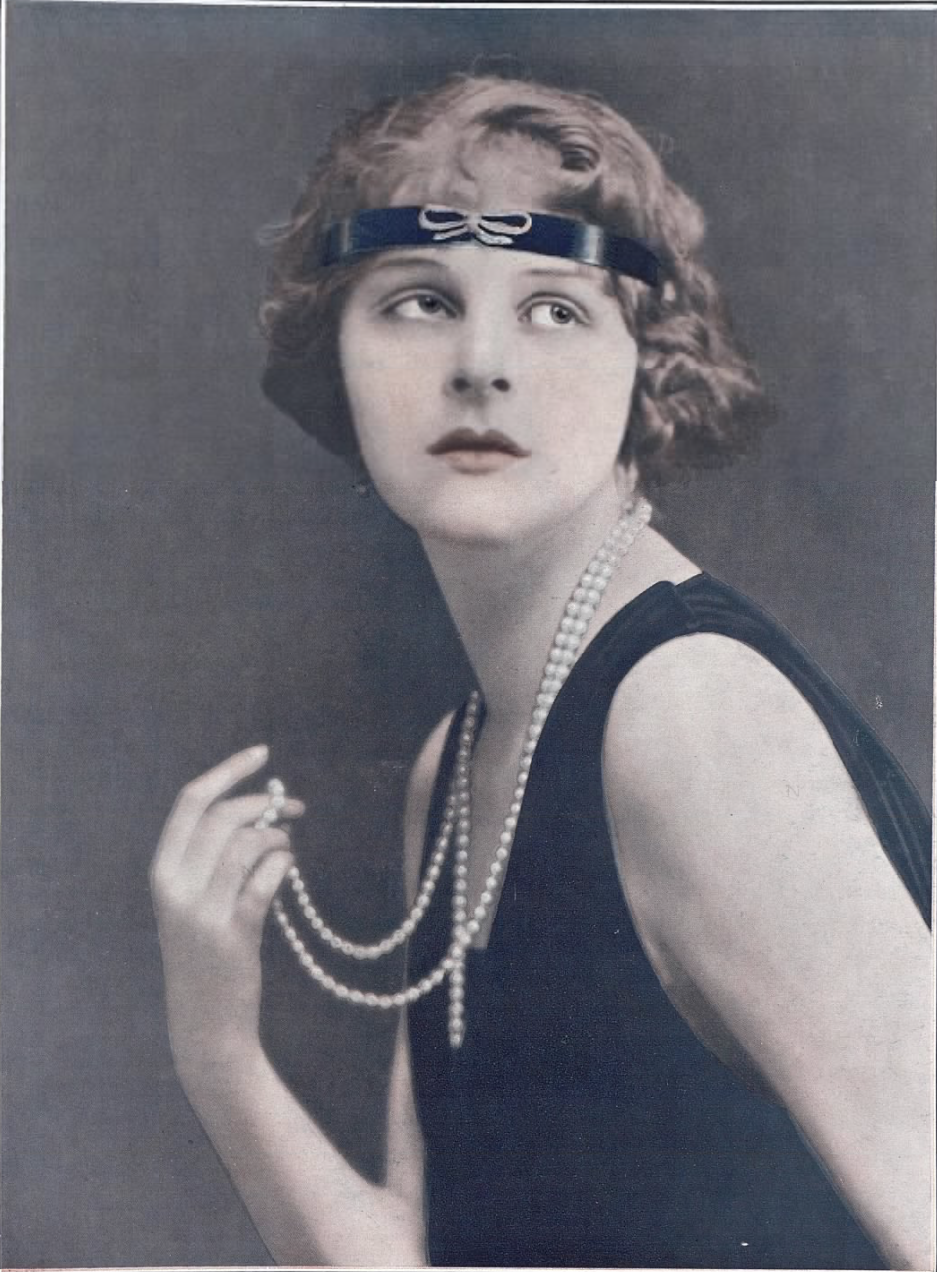
- Gray in a 1925 publication
- Born: Priscilla Pardridge; June 9, 1901; Chicago, Illinois, US
- Died: January 14, 1999 (aged 97); Vero Beach, Florida, US
- Occupations: Actress, writer
- Known for: Tarot cards
- Spouse: Lester Cohen

Eden Gray (June 9, 1901 – January 14, 1999) was the professional name of Priscilla Pardridge, an American actress, and writer on the esoteric meanings of tarot cards and their use in fortune-telling. Born into a wealthy family in Chicago, she was educated at a girl's boarding school in Connecticut. Against the wishes of her parents she pursued a career as an actress in New York where she married the novelist and screenwriter Lester Cohen. She had an active career as an actress on Broadway from 1920-1933 after which she settled in Buck County, Pennsylvania where she occasionally performed locally into the early 1940s. She made a few silent films in the mid 1920s, and appears in two sound films in the early 1940s. In her later life to she operated a book store specializing in the occult and metaphysical materials in Florida.

== Early life ==
The daughter of Albert J Pardridge and Florence Myers Pardridge, Priscilla Pardridge was born in Chicago on June 9, 1901. Her father was a wealthy real estate broker in that city, and the son of prominent Chicago businessman Charles Wellington Pardridge. The family was part of Chicago's upper class and resided in the wealthiest neighborhood in the city.

Priscilla was educated at Wykeham Rise School, a girl's boarding school in Washington, Connecticut. As a child she became interested in acting after attending many performances at the Garrick Theater which was owned by her family. In 1915 she performed with an amateur theatre group in Chicago, the Golf Lane Players. She fought with her parent over her desire to become an actress, and in 1919 asserted her independence by taking a job at a department store in Denver, Colorado. There she worked under the name Elsie Gray for a short period before returning to Chicago.

After further arguments with her parents, Priscilla's mother relented and allowed her to move to New York City to study acting in 1920. There she lived with her aunt, and changed her name to Eden Gray at the time. She married poet, screenwriter, and novelist Lester Cohen on January 3, 1921 in Manhattan. Their marriage ended in divorce in 1946. They had a son, the muralist Peter Gray Cohen.

== Acting career ==
Gray made her Broadway debut at the Belasco Theatre in December 1920 as The Lady with the Lorgnette in Harley Granville-Barker's English language adaptation of Sacha Guitry's French play Deburau. She appeared in her first Broadway musical in 1922 as Regina Marnac in Victor Herbert's Orange Blossoms at the Fulton Theatre. She performed in only one more musical, the part of Ninette in Rudolf Friml's musical Cinders (1923, Dresden Theatre). In 1923 she toured with Helen Hayes in Sophie Treadwell's Loney Lee.

Gray remained active in plays on the New York stage into the early 1930s. Her other Broadway credits included Miss Doolittle in Edward Laska's We've Got to Have Money (1923, Playhouse Theatre), Angela in Edwin Justus Mayer's The Firebrand (1924), Nora in Joseph Jefferson Farjeon's Number 7 (1926), the Office Nurse in What the Doctor Ordered (1927), May van der Luyden in The Age of Innocence (1928-1929), and Mavis in Doctor X (1931). Her final appearance on Broadway was as Olwen Peel in the revival of Dangerous Corner (1933); a play she also toured in the United States in 1934. After this she and her husband lived at a farm they bought in Lumberville, Pennsylvania. She occasionally appeared in plays at the nearby Bucks County Playhouse in the late 1930s and early 1940s.

In addition to working on the stage, Gray periodically worked as a film actress. She appeared in three silent films in the mid 1920s: Lovers in Quarantine (1925), A Kiss in the Dark (1925), and The Sorrows of Satan (1926). She later appeared in two sound films in the early 1940s: The Man Who Lost Himself (1941, as Venetia Scott) and King's Row (1942, as Mrs. Tower).

== Women's Army Corp and tarot author ==
Her acting career was temporarily put on hold during World War II when she became a lab technician with the Woman's Army Corps; enlisting on June 2, 1944 while living in Bucks County, Pennsylvania.

She also earned a Doctorate of Divinity degree from the First Church of Religious Science in New York. She opened a bookstore in the 1950s called Inspiration House Publishing, selling books on the occult and metaphysical issues. In the 1950s she wrote Tarot Revealed which was an introductory work to the tarot. She moved to Vero Beach, Florida in 1971. She was a member of the Vero Beach Art Club, Riverside Theater and Theater Guild. In the 1960s, through her books, Gray had an integral part in the creation of the contemporary interest in esoteric Tarot in general, and the Waite–Smith Tarot deck and the Fool's Journey interpretation of the Tarot trump cards in particular.

== Death ==
She was 97 years old when she died at IRM Hospital in Vero Beach on January 14, 1999.

== Works ==
- Tarot Revealed: A Modern Guide to Reading the Tarot Cards. Inspiration House, New York, 1960. reprinted, Signet Books 1969
- Recognition: Themes on Inner Perception, Inspiration House, 1969
- A Complete Guide to the Tarot. Bantam Books and Crown Publishers, New York, 1970
- Mastering the Tarot: Basic Lessons in an Ancient, Mystic Art. Crown Publishers, New York, 1971

=== Dutch editions ===
- Het geheim van de Tarot: de magische kaarten die verleden en toekomst onthullen, translated by Wim Gijsen, Kosmos-Z&K, 1996

=== Spanish editions ===
- Guía completa para el Tarot, Editorial Diana, Mexico, 1976
