= Of Human Bondage (1934 film) =

1934 film by John Cromwell

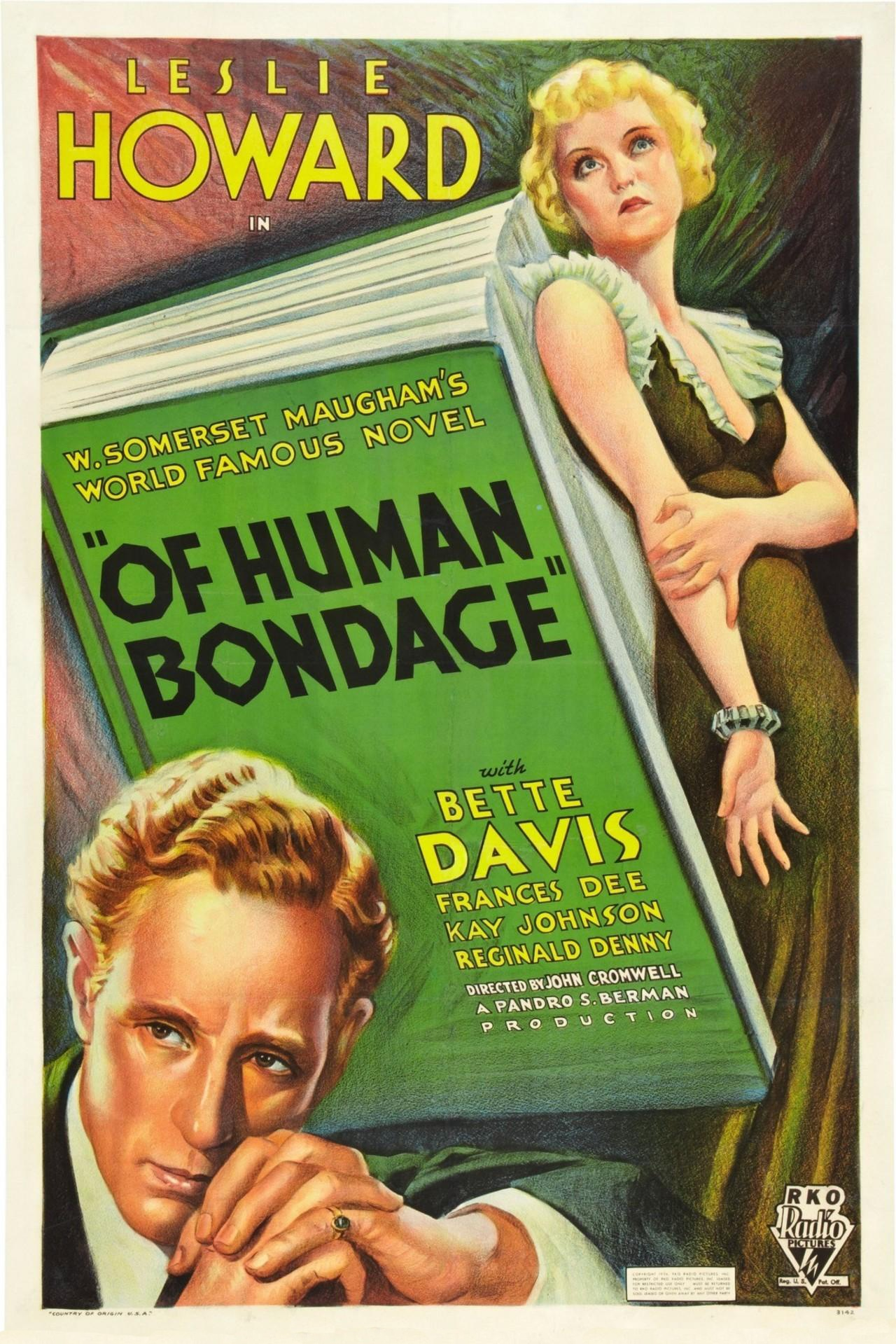
- Theatrical release poster
- Directed by: John Cromwell
- Screenplay by: Lester Cohen
- Based on: Of Human Bondage; 1915 novel by W. Somerset Maugham
- Produced by: Pandro S. Berman
- Starring: Leslie Howard; Bette Davis; Frances Dee
- Cinematography: Henry W. Gerrard
- Edited by: William Morgan
- Music by: Max Steiner
- Production company: RKO Radio Pictures
- Distributed by: RKO Radio Pictures
- Release date: June 28, 1934
- Running time: 83 minutes
- Country: United States
- Language: English
- Budget: $403,000
- Box office: $592,000

Of Human Bondage is a 1934 American drama film directed by John Cromwell and regarded by critics as the film that made Bette Davis a star. The screenplay by Lester Cohen is based on the 1915 novel Of Human Bondage by W. Somerset Maugham.

== Plot ==
Sensitive, club-footed artist Philip Carey is a Briton who has been studying painting in Paris for four years. His art teacher tells him his work lacks talent, so he returns to London to become a medical doctor, but his moodiness and chronic self-doubt make it difficult for him to keep up in his schoolwork.

Philip falls passionately in love with tearoom waitress Mildred Rogers, even though she is disdainful of his club foot and his obvious interest in her. Knowing he is attracted to her, she is manipulative and cruel toward him when he asks her for a date. Her constant response to his romantic invitations is "I don't mind", an expression so uninterested that it infuriates him – which only causes her to use it all the more. His daydreams about her distract him from his studies, and he fails his medical examinations.

When Philip proposes to her, Mildred declines, telling him she will be marrying Emil Miller (a loutish salesman) instead. The self-centred Mildred vindictively berates Philip with nasty insults for becoming romantically interested in her.

Philip begins to forget Mildred when he becomes involved with Norah, an attractive and considerate romance writer working under a male pseudonym. She slowly helps him resolve his painful addiction to Mildred. However, just when it appears that Philip is finding happiness, Mildred returns, pregnant and claiming that Emil has abandoned her. Philip provides a flat for her, arranges to take care of her financially, and breaks off his relationship with Norah. Norah and Philip admit how interpersonal relationships may amount to bondage (Philip was bound to Mildred, as Norah was to Philip, and as Mildred was to Emil). Philip's intention is to marry Mildred after her child is born, but a bored and restless Mildred is an uninterested mother, and she hands the baby's care to a nurse.

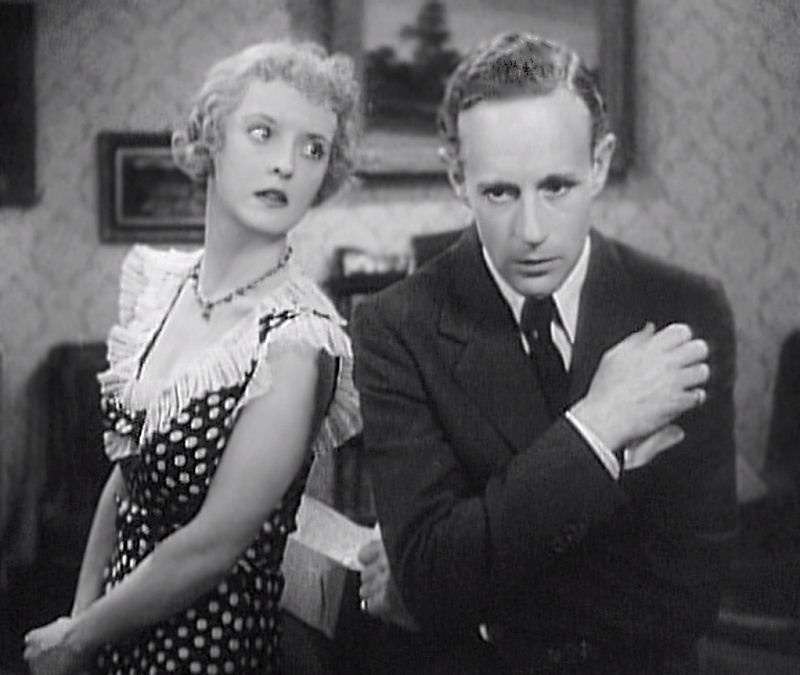
Bette Davis and Leslie Howard

At a dinner party celebrating their engagement, one of Philip's medical student friends, Harry Griffiths, flirts with Mildred, who somewhat reciprocates. After Philip confronts Mildred, she runs off with Griffiths to Paris. A second time, Philip again finds some comfort in his studies, and with Sally Athelny, the tender-hearted daughter of one of his elderly patients in a charity hospital. The Athelny family is caring and affectionate, and they take Philip into their home.

Once again, Mildred returns with her baby, this time expressing remorse for deserting him. Philip cannot resist rescuing her and helping her recover from another failed relationship. Things take a turn for the worse when Mildred moves in, spitefully wrecks his apartment, destroys his paintings and books, and burns the securities and bonds an uncle gave him to finance his tuition. Philip is forced to quit medical school. Before he leaves the institution, an operation corrects his club foot. The Athelnys take Philip in when he is unable to find work and is locked out of his flat, and he takes a job with Sally's father as a window dresser.

Later, Philip meets Mildred, now sick with tuberculosis, destitute, and — the movie obliquely hints — working as a prostitute. Her baby has died, and she has become distraught. As time progresses, Philip receives a letter that informs him that his uncle has died, leaving a small inheritance. With the inheritance money, Philip is able to return to medical school, pass his exams, and become a physician. At the hospital, Philip learns that Mildred has died in a charity ward. With Mildred's death, Philip is finally freed of his obsession, and he makes plans to marry Sally.

== Cast ==
Of Human Bondage

- Leslie Howard as Philip Carey
- Bette Davis as Mildred Rogers
- Frances Dee as Sally Athelny
- Kay Johnson as Norah
- Reginald Denny as Harry Griffiths
- Alan Hale as Emil Miller
- Reginald Sheffield as Cyril Dunsford
- Reginald Owen as Thorpe Athelny
- Desmond Roberts as Dr. Jacobs
- Tempe Pigott as Agnes Hollet, Philip's landlady (uncredited)

== Production ==
In 1932, director Michael Curtiz showed Cromwell a print of his recently completed film The Cabin in the Cotton because Cromwell was interested in casting its leading man, Richard Barthelmess, in a project he was preparing. Instead of Barthelmess, Cromwell's attention was drawn to Bette Davis, whose portrayal of a femme fatale brought to mind the slatternly waitress Mildred in W. Somerset Maugham's 1915 novel Of Human Bondage. Cromwell knew producer Pandro S. Berman had purchased the rights to Maugham's story for Leslie Howard and when he suggested Davis would be the perfect co-star, Berman agreed. Maugham also supported her being cast in the role.

Screenwriter Wilson Mizner brought a copy of the Maugham novel to Davis, who was in the midst of filming her 20,000 Years in Sing Sing. After reading it and learning RKO held the screen rights, she implored Jack L. Warner to lend her to the rival studio. "At the time, however", Davis later recalled, "Warner Brothers had other plans for me. They thought they needed me desperately for such immortal classics as Fashions of 1934, The Big Shakedown, and Jimmy the Gent." She filmed those as well as Fog Over Frisco but continued to harass Warner, who continued to object because he felt the role of Mildred would destroy her glamorous image, the same reason Katharine Hepburn, Irene Dunne, and Ann Harding reportedly declined the role. "An evil heroine such as Mildred was really unheard of in that day. J. L. could not possibly understand any actress who would want to play such a part", Davis said. Warner finally relented only because Mervyn LeRoy wanted RKO contract player Irene Dunne for Sweet Adeline, the screen adaptation of the Jerome Kern-Oscar Hammerstein II musical, and the two studios agreed to trade actresses.

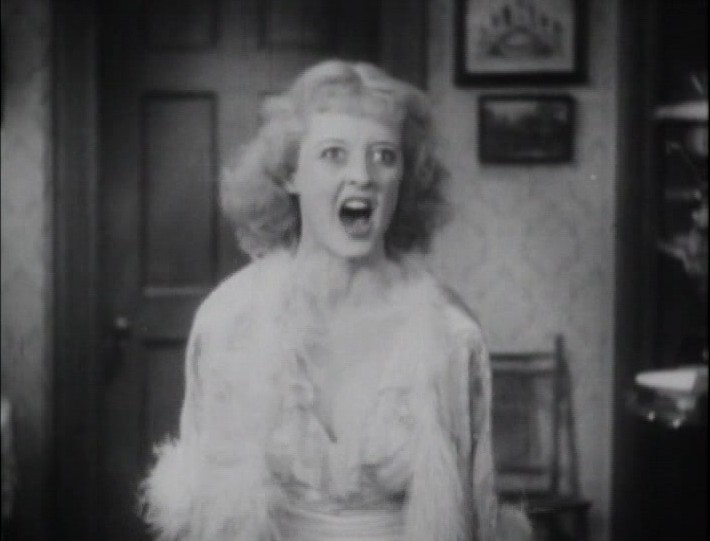
Bette Davis was acclaimed for her portrayal of the shrewish Mildred in Of Human Bondage.

In order to prepare for the role, Davis hired an English housekeeper: "She had just the right amount of cockney in her speech for Mildred. I never told her she was teaching me cockney – for fear she would exaggerate her own accent." Her efforts failed to impress Leslie Howard who, along with other British cast members, was upset an American had been cast in the role. "I really couldn't blame them", Davis stated. But his behaviour on the set was distressing: "Mr. Howard would read a book off-stage, all the while throwing me his lines during my close-ups. He became a little less detached when he was informed that the kid was walking away with the picture." Film historian Kingley Canham observes that Leslie Howard, in the "gentlemanly understatement" of his performance, served as a counter-balance to Davis’s frequent domination of her less-talented male co-stars.

Davis designed her own make-up for the scenes depicting the final stages of Mildred's illness, changed from syphilis to tuberculosis to satisfy the demands of the Hays Code, which, under Joseph Breen, was beginning to expand and rigidly enforce an all-encompassing Production Code. On July 1, 1934, three days after the film was released, the upgraded system of censorship was formally announced.

"I made it very clear that Mildred was not going to die of a dread disease looking as if a deb had missed her noon nap. The last stages of consumption, poverty, and neglect are not pretty, and I intended to be convincing-looking. We pulled no punches, and Mildred emerged ... as starkly real as a pestilence."

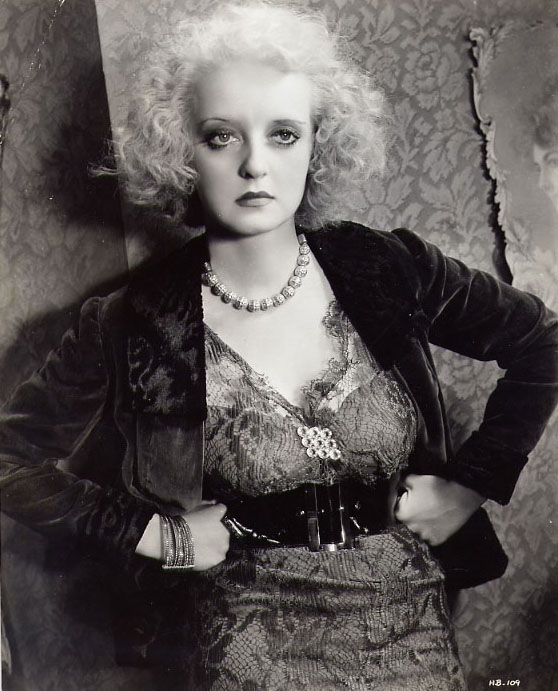
Publicity still of Bette Davis in the 1934 film Of Human Bondage

Reflecting on her performance in later years, Davis said, "My understanding of Mildred's vileness – not compassion but empathy – gave me pause ... I was still an innocent. And yet Mildred's machinations I miraculously understood when it came to playing her. I was often ashamed of this ... I suppose no amount of rationalization can change the fact that we are all made up of good and evil."

== Release ==
Nervous about audience reaction to her performance, Davis opted not to attend a preview of the film in Santa Barbara, although her mother Ruth and husband Harmon O. Nelson went. Ruth later related, "For one hour and a half of horrible realism, we sat riveted without speaking a word, with only a fleeting glance now and then at each other. We left the theater in absolute silence. Neither of us knew what to think, for we felt the picture would make or break her, but would the public like the unpleasant story as well as the people at the preview seemed to?" Upon arriving home, her husband told Davis he thought her performance, while "painfully sincere", might harm her career.

One reaction RKO executives never expected to hear at the preview was laughter. After watching the film several times, they felt the Max Steiner score was to blame, and the composer wrote a new one that included a motif for each of the principal characters.

The film premiered at Radio City Music Hall on June 28, 1934, and went into general release on July 20.

== Reception ==
In a contemporary review, Mordaunt Hall of The New York Times said the Maugham novel "has come through the operation of being transferred to the screen in an unexpectedly healthy fashion. It may not possess any great dramatic strength, but the very lifelike quality of the story and the marked authenticity of its atmosphere cause the spectators to hang on every word uttered by the interesting group of characters." He thought Leslie Howard's portrayal "excels any performance he has given before the camera. No more expert illustration of getting under the skin of the character has been done in motion pictures", and he described Bette Davis as "enormously effective".

In 2017. The Radio Times Guide to Films gave the film 4/5 stars, writing: "In the first, and best, screen version of Somerset Maugham's famous novel, Leslie Howard is sensitive and polished as the gentlemanly artist turned medical student who almost ruins his life over his obsessive infatuation with a vindictive teashop waitress. Bette Davis proves her credentials in this latter role, offering a nuanced portrayal that rises above her cockney accent. There is excellent support, too, and plaudits must go to John Cromwell's tightly controlled and atmospheric direction."

The generally rave reviews upset Warner executives, who were embarrassed one of their contract players was being acclaimed for a film made at another studio, and they tried to exclude its title from any publicity about Davis.

The film recorded a loss of $45,000.

== Academy Awards ==
Although Davis's nomination for the Academy Award for Best Actress was considered a sure thing by many, she was ignored in favor of Grace Moore for One Night of Love, Norma Shearer for The Barretts of Wimpole Street, and eventual winner Claudette Colbert for It Happened One Night. A loud faction heralding Davis's performance ended up with the academy allowing "write in" votes in addition to the official nominees that year. Angry voters ignored the nominees on their ballots and wrote in Davis's name, and it was later announced that she had come in third, after Colbert and Shearer. Price Waterhouse was hired to count the votes and initiated the custom of keeping the results a secret the following year, when Davis was named Best Actress for Dangerous. Entertainment Weekly called Davis's Oscar snub one of the worst ever.

== Remake and rights ==
The rights to Maugham's novel were acquired by Warner Bros. who made the 1946 remake starring Eleanor Parker.

When Howard Hughes sold RKO, the negative and all prints for the film were burnt. The copyright registration for the film was not renewed so the film potentially entered the public domain in the United States in 1962, although the literary rights were not in the public domain.

Seven Arts Productions and Metro-Goldwyn-Mayer acquired the rights for the 1964 remake starring Kim Novak and Laurence Harvey.

=== Home media ===
With the film being in the public domain, there are numerous DVD and online streaming copies available. WarnerMedia is the current owner of the bulk of the RKO library and a UK DVD was issued in 2003 by Warner Home Video.

Original pre-print materials are not known to survive, but the film was preserved by the Library of Congress from archival 35mm elements and this version was released on US DVD and Blu-ray by Kino Lorber in 2013.

== In fiction ==
In James Baldwin's 1953 novel Go Tell It on the Mountain, protagonist John Grimes sees Of Human Bondage in cinema. The movie title is never revealed but the tagline "There’s a fool like him in every family — and a woman next door to take him over" is mentioned and the plotline is described in detail over three pages in the first chapter of the novel.
