= Coming Home (Cohen novel) =

1945 novel by Lester Cohen

- First edition
- Author: Lester Cohen
- Cover artist: H. L. Hoffman
- Language: English
- Publisher: Viking Press
- Publication date: 1945
- Publication place: United States
- Media type: Print (Hardback
- Pages: 378
- OCLC: 6738432
- Preceded by: Two Worlds
- Followed by: Mom and Pop

Coming Home is a novel by the American writer Lester Cohen (1901–1963) set in Pittsburgh, Pennsylvania.

It tells the story of Joe and Stella. He is back from serving in the U.S. Army during World War II, and together with Stella and their baby, they battle against a steel tycoon, a ward heeler, and a corrupt police force in America's steel city.

The book was reissued in the 1950s under the title Stella and Joe.
