= Wim Gijsen =

Dutch writer (1933–1990)

Wim Gijsen (20 August 1933 in Zwolle – 30 October 1990) was a Dutch science fiction and fantasy writer.

== Biography ==
Wim Gijsen was one of the Netherlands' most successful writers of modern science fiction and fantasy books. Previously he had been known as a writer of prose, poems, children's books and various works on meditation, vegetarianism and yoga, and translated a book on Tarot by Eden Gray. In 1980 he published his first science fiction novel De Eersten Van Rissan (The First Ones of Rissan). One year later the second part of the series was released: De Koningen Van Weleer (The Kings of the Past). He also wrote another science fiction series: Iskander de Dromendief (Iskander the Dream Thief) and Het Huis van de Wolf (The House of the Wolf).

Until his death, he continued writing fantasy literature, with the Deirdre-trilogy being his most popular work today.

Gijsen repeatedly used a special theme in his books: A distant planet, where humans coming from Earth have settled down centuries ago and have forgotten about their technological past, now live in a culture that resembles Earth's Middle Ages, with only few people who are aware of technology and who do not share the belief in magic and superstition that the human society has adopted.

== The Rissan series ==
- 1980: The First Ones of Rissan, OT: De Eersten Van Rissan
- 1981: The Kings of the Past, OT: De Koningen Van Weleer

In The First Ones of Rissan, the state of Lhissey is being ruled by a caste of priests who divide the inhabitants into five castes that have to obey strict religious rules. The people of Lhissey do not know that the clairvoyant priests are actually using modern technology to spy on them and to control their behaviour. One day Hirdan, the son of a craftsman, meets a stranger and shows him the ancient city, which immediately raises the priests' suspicions. They promise Hirdan to accept him as one of the candidates for the highest caste if he can find out what the stranger wants in Lhissey. Hirdan, who realizes that the caste system is a detriment to the people of Lhissey refuses and flees from the city – accompanied by the stranger, who turns out to be an archeologist who is interested in the old pyramid in the centre of the city which must have been there long before the first men came to Rissan. The First Ones of Rissan must have built the pyramid and it is his job to find out where they have gone. Things get even more complicated when Hirdan finds out that the mysterious stranger came to Rissan travelling through the stars like the Gods in the ancient myths of his people.

== The Dream Thief series ==
- 1982: Iskander the Dream Thief, OT: Iskander de Dromendief
- 1983: The House of the Wolf, OT: Het Huis van de Wolf

Iskander, a mediocre magician, is travelling through the Island Kingdom of Albe and tries to make ends meet by astonishing his superstitious clients with his simple magic tricks. His only real talent is his ability to enter other people's dreams, changing them in the process. A High Priestess turns to him to seek help for the young Prince of Albe, who is constantly tormented by cruel dreams that could eventually cause a war between Albe and the "Continent of Taurus". Iskander soon realizes that these dreams are not mere nightmares, but they have been sent by a dark force from the distant Western Continent that wants to invade the rich kingdom of Albe. The "Wolf" then attacks the Holy Island of Vale, the spiritual center of Albe, with his fleet and Iskander has to conquer his own fears to fight his overpowering enemy.

== Deirdre-Trilogy ==
- 1985: Keerkringen.
- 1985: Bidahinne
- 1986: Lure

Living in a medieval world dominated by men, the young priestess Deirdre soon learns what it means to be an outcast, after she leaves her monastery without seeking permission in order to see her father one last time before his death. Her family rejects her, so she is forced to earn money as a deckhand in the city of Chelle. Due to her advanced education, she is one of only few women who are able to read, write and do number work, so Deirdre manages to establish a successful enterprise consisting of the capital of the many poor women living in the large city. However, some wealthy business men do not approve of the new competitor and start an intrigue that brings Deirdre not only to court, but she is also sentenced to serve as a prostitute in a local temple. After a long time of indignity, she is bought free by a mysterious abbess from a distant desert monastery beyond the Lavender Sea. She explains to Deirdre that she might be the long sought 'Bidahinne', the woman who was mentioned in a prophecy and who will bring freedom between the known world and the distant kingdom of Lure, where powerful women reign, who possess weapons much stronger than any of those known to men. An adventurous journey begins for Deirdre and the delegates of the monastery, beyond the mountains, to a mysterious land that no man of the known world has seen in millennia.
