= For the Defense (1930 film) =

1930 film

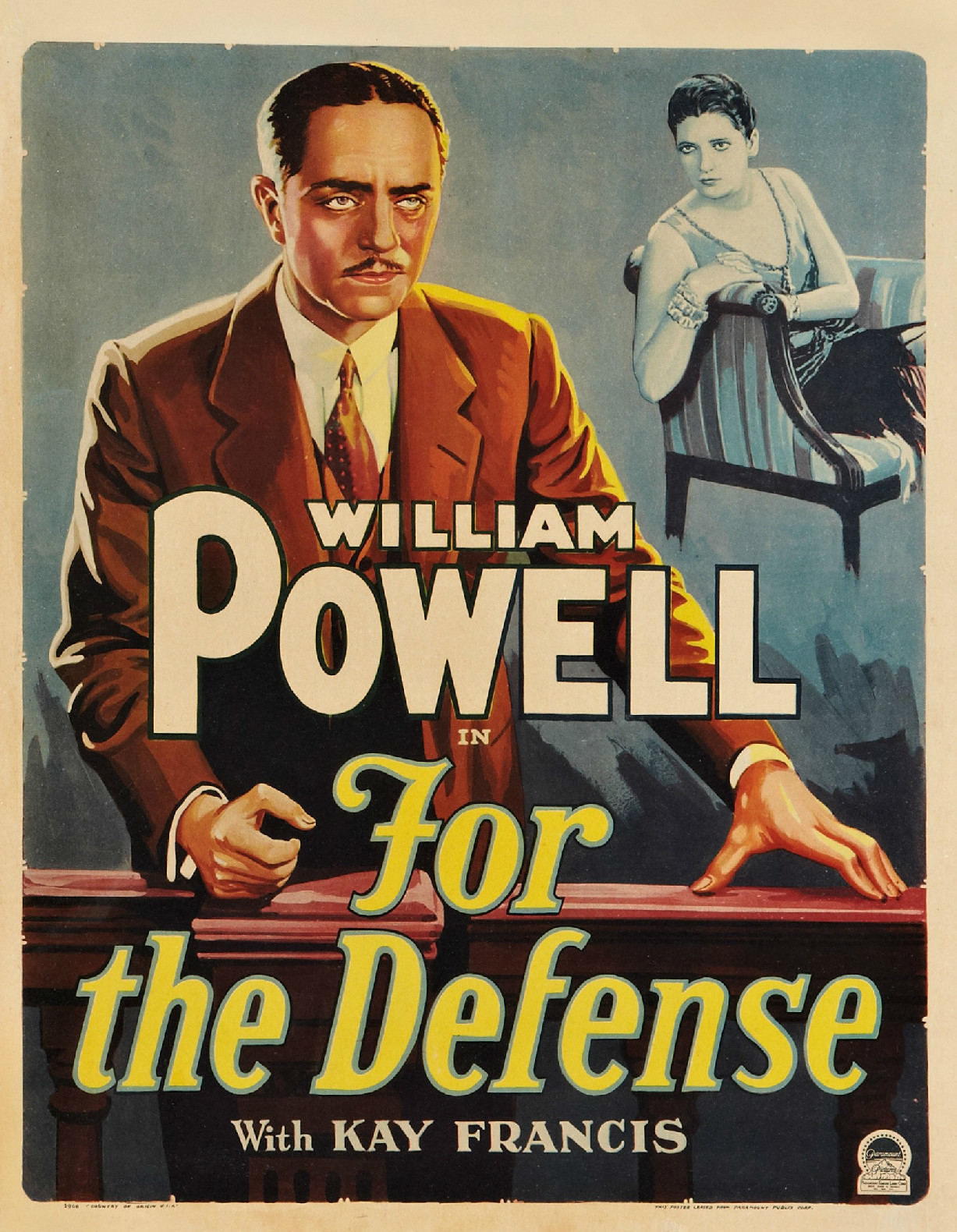
- Theatrical release poster
- Directed by: John Cromwell
- Screenplay by: Oliver H. P. Garrett
- Story by: Charles Furthmann
- Starring: William Powell; Kay Francis
- Cinematography: Charles Lang
- Edited by: George Nichols Jr.
- Production company: Paramount Pictures
- Release date: July 19, 1930 (New York)
- Running time: 85 minutes
- Country: United States
- Language: English

For the Defense is a 1930 pre-Code crime drama film starring William Powell as a lawyer whose ethics are challenged when the woman whom he loves kills a pedestrian while driving with another suitor.

== Plot ==
For the Defense (1930)

New York criminal defense attorney William Foster is so successful that prosecutors regard him as a menace. He holds himself to high ethical standards but is willing to mislead without actually lying.

Foster defends a man who planned a murder using explosives. At trial, District Attorney Stone displays a vial for the jury and asserts that the liquid inside is explosive nitroglycerin. Foster sniffs the liquid, questions Stone to verify the chain of custody, and smashes the vial dramatically on the floor. When order is restored, he explains to the judge that he knew that his action was safe because nitroglycerin has a distinctive smell and that Stone had removed the original contents after the chemical test. Foster's stunt wins his case.

Foster is in love with actress Irene Manners, who loves him but wants to marry while he does not. Suitor Jack Defoe, proposes marriage to her and she accepts. While driving home with Dafoe, he suddenly hugs her and she loses control of the car, killing a bystander.

To protect Irene's reputation, Defoe urges her to leave the scene, misleading her to believe that the victim is not badly hurt. Presumed to have been driving while drunk, he is charged with manslaughter. Irene and Defoe conceal her involvement, but she begs Foster to defend Defoe. Foster asks why she cares so deeply about Defoe, but Irene denies a romantic relationship. Foster agrees to defend Defoe but finds that he cannot present a credible story at trial.

Foster learns that Irene was at the accident scene, meaning that she had misled Foster about her relationship with Defoe. Foster is crushed, but Irene begs him to continue working for Defoe's acquittal. Defoe fears that Foster will intentionally lose the case and that Irene will be charged and convicted as well. Foster, acting on his love for Irene, bribes a juror to vote for acquittal, hanging the jury.

Foster's bribe is quickly discovered and he is arrested, defending himself at trial. As Foster will not see Irene, she visits Stone to admit what really had happened at the accident scene, claiming that Foster was only trying to protect her. Irene warns that if Stone does not agree to recommend mercy, she will tell her story in court. Stone contemplates her ultimatum.

Although his defense is proceeding well, Foster offers to plead guilty (thus causing his own disbarment) if only Stone will agree not to retry Defoe, but Stone refuses a deal. In court, Irene passes Foster a note pleading to let her testify and tell the truth. To protect her, Foster immediately changes his plea to guilty. Stone then tells Foster that neither Defoe nor Irene will be prosecuted.

As Foster arrives at Sing Sing to serve his sentence, Irene is there and pledges that she will be waiting for him when his sentence ends. He says that if she does indeed wait, he will marry her.

== Cast ==
- William Powell as William Foster
- Kay Francis as Irene Manners
- Scott Kolk as Jack Defoe
- William B. Davidson as District Attorney Stone
- John Elliott as McGann
- Thomas E. Jackson as Daly
- Harry Walker as Miller
- James Finlayson as Parrott
- Charles West as Joe
- Bertram Marburgh as Judge Evans
- George 'Gabby' Hayes as Ben - Waiter
- John Cromwell as Second Reporter at Trial (uncredited)
