= The World and the Flesh =

1932 film

- Theatrical release poster
- Directed by: John Cromwell
- Screenplay by: Oliver H.P. Garrett
- Starring: George Bancroft; Miriam Hopkins; Alan Mowbray; George E. Stone; Mitchell Lewis; Max Wagner; Harry Cording
- Cinematography: Karl Struss
- Music by: Herman Hand; John Leipold; Stephan Pasternacki
- Production company: Paramount Pictures
- Distributed by: Paramount Pictures
- Release date: April 22, 1932
- Running time: 74 minutes
- Country: United States
- Language: English

The World and the Flesh is a 1932 American pre-Code drama film directed by John Cromwell and written by Oliver H.P. Garrett. The film stars George Bancroft, Miriam Hopkins, Alan Mowbray, George E. Stone, Mitchell Lewis, Max Wagner and Harry Cording. The film was released on April 22, 1932, by Paramount Pictures.

== Plot ==
"A soldier of fortune risks his life to save a rich girl's friends during Russian Revolution—at a price!"

== Cast ==
- George Bancroft as Kylenko
- Miriam Hopkins as Maria Yaskaya
- Alan Mowbray as Dimitri
- George E. Stone as Rutchkin
- Mitchell Lewis as Sukhanov
- Max Wagner as Vorobiov
- Harry Cording as Ivanovitch
- Emmett Corrigan as Gen. Spiro
- Oscar Apfel as Banker
- Reginald Barlow as Markov
