= Rich Man's Folly =

1931 film

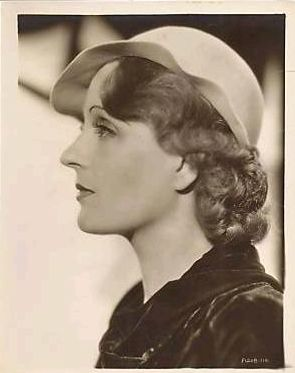
- Promotional still of Juliette Compton for the film
- Directed by: John Cromwell
- Screenplay by: Edward E. Paramore Jr. Grover Jones
- Starring: George Bancroft; Frances Dee; Robert Ames; Juliette Compton; David Durand; Dorothy Peterson; Harry Allen
- Cinematography: David Abel
- Edited by: George Nichols Jr.
- Music by: Herman Hand; W. Franke Harling; Bernhard Kaun; Rudolph G. Kopp; John Leipold; Oscar Potoker
- Production company: Paramount Pictures
- Distributed by: Paramount Pictures
- Release date: November 14, 1931
- Running time: 80 minutes
- Country: United States
- Language: English

Rich Man's Folly is a 1931 American pre-Code drama film directed by John Cromwell and written by Edward E. Paramore Jr. and Grover Jones. The film stars George Bancroft, Frances Dee, Robert Ames, Juliette Compton, David Durand, Dorothy Peterson, and Harry Allen. The film was released on November 14, 1931, by Paramount Pictures. This modern adaptation of the 1848 novel Dombey and Son is regarded as Hollywood's first major sound adaptation of a Charles Dickens work.

== Cast ==
- George Bancroft as Brock Trumbull
- Frances Dee as Ann Trumbull
- Robert Ames as Joe Warren
- Juliette Compton as Paula Norcross
- David Durand as Brock Junior
- Dorothy Peterson as Katherine Trumbull
- Harry Allen as McWylie
- Gilbert Emery as Kincaid
- Guy Oliver as Dayton
- Anne Shirley as Anne, as a child
- George MacFarlane as Marston

=== Criticism ===
Director John Cromwell commented on the film and actor George Bancroft in an interview with historian Kinglesy Canham (circa 1975):

”...Rich Man’s Folly was a very good opportunity [to make something more than a routine picture]; it was a modern dress version of Dickens’ Dombey and Son, and it should have been absolutely splendid for Bancroft except that it required in the actor a consciousness of the material—of which he had none! To him it was always just another part to play in the same old manner. He had no realization of the opportunities that were there, so they were simply missed.”

== Preservation status ==
Although the film does still exist, Rich Man's Folly has not been seen publicly in decades. It has never been released onto VHS or DVD, and no re-showings or television broadcasts are known to have taken place. A surviving copy currently exists in the UCLA Film & Television Archive, and the film can be viewed on YouTube. Paramount created a promotional film in 1931 called The House That Shadows Built, with excerpts of Rich Man's Folly featured.
