= Jalna (film) =

1935 film by John Cromwell

- Scene from the film featuring (left to right) David Manners, Molly Lamont, Kay Johnson, Nigel Bruce and Ian Hunter
- Directed by: John Cromwell
- Written by: Garrett Fort (adaptation); Lawrence P. Bachmann (adaptation); Anthony Veiller (screenplay)
- Based on: Jalna; 1927 novel by Mazo de la Roche
- Produced by: Kenneth Macgowan
- Starring: Kay Johnson; Ian Hunter; C. Aubrey Smith
- Cinematography: Edward Cronjager
- Edited by: William Morgan
- Music by: Alberto Colombo
- Production company: RKO Radio Pictures
- Distributed by: RKO Radio Pictures
- Release date: August 9, 1935
- Running time: 75 or 78 minutes
- Country: United States
- Language: English

Jalna is a 1935 RKO Radio Pictures romantic-drama film based on the 1927 novel of the same name by Mazo de la Roche. It stars Kay Johnson, Ian Hunter and C. Aubrey Smith. In the film, a newlywed has to adjust to her husband's odd family.

== Cast ==
- Kay Johnson as Alayne Archer Whiteoak
- Ian Hunter as Renny Whiteoak
- C. Aubrey Smith as Uncle Nicholas Whiteoak
- Nigel Bruce as Maurice Vaughan
- David Manners as Eden Whiteoak
- Peggy Wood as Meg Whiteoak
- Jessie Ralph as Gran Whiteoak
- Theodore Newton as Piers Whiteoak
- Halliwell Hobbes as Uncle Ernest Whiteoak
- George Offerman Jr. as Finch Whiteoak
- Clifford Severn as Wakefield "Wake" Whiteoak
- Molly Lamont as Pheasant Vaughan Whiteoak
- Forrester Harvey as Rags

== Reception ==
The critic for The New York Times wrote, "the Whiteoaks are an interesting family—on paper or on the screen—and ... this first photoplay about them manages to do them justice." The reviewer praised "the generally splendid characterizations by an excellent cast".
