= Careful, Soft Shoulders =

1942 film directed by Oliver H. P. Garrett

- Theatrical release poster
- Directed by: Oliver H. P. Garrett
- Screenplay by: Oliver H. P. Garrett
- Produced by: Walter Morosco
- Starring: Virginia Bruce; James Ellison; Aubrey Mather; Sheila Ryan; Ralph Byrd; Sigfrid Tor
- Cinematography: Charles G. Clarke
- Edited by: Nick DeMaggio
- Music by: Leigh Harline; Emil Newman
- Production company: 20th Century Fox
- Distributed by: 20th Century Fox
- Release date: September 18, 1942
- Running time: 69 minutes
- Country: United States
- Language: English

Careful, Soft Shoulders is a 1942 American comedy film written and directed by Oliver H. P. Garrett. The film stars Virginia Bruce, James Ellison, Aubrey Mather, Sheila Ryan, Ralph Byrd and Sigfrid Tor. It was released on September 18, 1942, by 20th Century Fox.

== Plot ==
The attack on Pearl Harbor occurs and America's declaration of war stirs patriotism in Connie Mathers, who until now has been more interested in Washington, D.C. parties and clothes. A comment by shipping magnate's son Tommy Aldrich that people like Connie and him are "useless" to the war effort inspires Connie to prove him wrong.

Offering her services as a spy to sister Agatha's boyfriend Elliott, an army intelligence agent, Connie ends up being approached by a mysterious man who identifies himself as "Mr. Fortune" and assigns tasks to test her, using passages from the book Gone with the Wind as a code. When she meets Mr. Fortune's approval, he has her investigate whether Tommy is an enemy spy. A confused Connie confides in Elliott, but soon he disappears.

After her sister also vanishes, Connie realizes she has been duped by Mr. Fortune, who proceeds to take her and Tommy captive as well. Luckily, she escapes in time to help the military head off an enemy submarine, saving the day.

== Cast ==
- Virginia Bruce as Connie Mathers
- James Ellison as Thomas Aldrich
- Aubrey Mather as Mr. Fortune
- Sheila Ryan as Agatha Mather
- Ralph Byrd as Elliott Salmon
- Sigfrid Tor as Milo
- Charles Tannen as Joe
- William B. Davidson as Mr. Aldrich
- Dale Winter as Mrs. Ipswich
