= Lester Cohen =

American writer (1901–1963)

- Born: August 17, 1901; Chicago, Illinois, U.S.
- Died: July 17, 1963 (aged 61)
- Education: University of Chicago
- Occupations: Novelist; screenwriter; author
- Spouse(s): Priscilla Pardridge Diana Peckham (m. 1947)
- Children: 1
- Parent(s): Hyman Cohen; Annie Harchovsky
- Writing career
- Genre: Non-fiction

Lester Cohen (August 17, 1901 – July 17, 1963) was an American novelist, screenwriter and author of non-fiction. He is best known as the author of the novels Sweepings and Coming Home, and the screen play for Of Human Bondage.

== Early life ==
Cohen was born in Chicago, Illinois, to Annie Harchovsky and Hyman Cohen from Minsk. Both emigrated to the United States in their early teens and worked in sweatshops. Hyman Cohen became a doctor, was a pioneer in public health, an officer of the Chicago Public Health Department. He later became an eye specialist and taught ophthalmology at Rush Medical College. Hyman was also a writer, authoring several books both in his specialty and two novels.

Cohen went to public schools in Chicago and briefly attended the University of Chicago. He started his career as a poet, then worked at various newspapers including the Chicago Daily News and the New York Graphic in New York City (the subject of his 1964 book, The New York Graphic: The World’s Zaniest Newspaper).

When he was 19, Cohen met Priscilla Pardridge (later known as Eden Gray) at a poetry reading at the literary Dil Pickle Club. Gray was a Broadway actress, radio personality, publisher and author of several books on Tarot cards and other subjects. After several dates, they agreed to move separately to NYC and then get married so that Gray could pursue a career as a Broadway actress. She left for the East Coast and he followed a few weeks later. Gray found work as an artists’ model in silent films (then being made in Brooklyn), before succeeding on Broadway. Cohen worked in advertising and later got a job as contest editor for McFadden’s "New York Graphic". The New York Times mentions their wedding: 25 January 1921, "Society Girl Weds Poet; Priscilla Pardridge of Chicago Marries Lester Cohen in New York." Her family was not pleased. The couple had a son, Peter Gray Cohen (November 12, 1925 – September 7, 2014) who was a painter, muralist and left wing activist. Cohen later married Diana Peckham in 1947. Peckham was a mathematician who worked on early cosmic ray research.

== Political commitment ==
Cohen was a member of the Dreiser Committee which visited the Kentucky coal fields in 1931 to document the labor struggles of Harlan County coal miners. John Dos Passos, Sherwood Anderson and other notable American writers were also on this committee and contributed to the written report produced by Dreiser.

Cohen was a member of the League of American Writers, an affiliation of communists and communist sympathizers that was active between 1935 and 1943.

Cohen represented the American League for a Free Palestine at the first United Nations Conference in San Francisco in 1945.

Cohen was a founding member of the Screen Writers’ Guild and was a member of the Authors’ Guild of America from 1926 to his death in 1963.

== Writing career ==
Cohen was the author of nine published books, two (or more) unpublished works (including The Fabulous World of Horace Liveright about the founder of Boni-Liveright Publishers and his circle, and Fallen Nation, an epic unfinished at the time of his death); six full-length stage plays, many short plays and scripts for television; poetry; articles and stories for periodicals; reviews and editorials for Variety; and many screen plays and treatments for motion pictures.

== Books ==
- Sweepings (Boni & Liveright: NY, 1926, reissued 1957–8) about the rise and fall of a department store dynasty in Chicago based on his wife, Eden’s, family history.
- The Great Bear (Boni & Liveright: NY, 1927). A story of the Chicago commodity market, it too was about Eden’s family history.
- Oscar Wilde: a play (Boni & Liveright: NY, 1928). Published in book form. The play did not find a producer and there was speculation that there was too much prejudice to stage a frank portrayal of the subject. at that time.
- Aaron Traum (Horace Liveright: NY,1930). Written with his father, Hyman Cohen, about Hyman’s immigration to America.
- Two Worlds (Covici; Firat: NY, 1936). Based on a world tour he made with Eden. The idea, new at the time, was about the world’s division into communist and democratic states from a personal perspective.
- Billy Mitchell (Dutton Publishers: NY, 1942). Written with Emile Gauvreau was about the prophetic general of the U.S. Air Force. Mitchell was an early vocal advocate for the use of aircraft carriers and military projection of strength through the air.
- Coming Home (Viking Press: NY, 1945, reissued 1957). A fictional account of a returning WWII veteran’s fight against political corruption set amid the steel mills of Pittsburgh.
- Mom and Pop (Chilton: NY, 1963). A biographical account of his own parents.
- The New York Graphic: The World’s Zaniest Newspaper (Chilton: NY, 1964)

== Motion pictures ==
Cohen was in the motion pictures industry for 20 years and sold many original stories to a variety of major studios including: The Dam (MGM, 1941), Mamie Q (sold first to Warner Brothers in 1941 and then to RKO in 1942), and Women at War (Columbia, 1942). Although he worked on Pride of the Yankees in 1933–34, he refused credits as he did on several other pictures and unfinished projects. His major successes were:

- Sweepings (RKO 1933) with Lionel Barrymore and Gregory Ratoff (his first starring role). Sweepings was made again in 1939.
- One Man’s Journey (RKO 1933) (with long-time friend and collaborator Sam Ornitz) starring Lionel Barrymore, May Robson and Joel McCrea.
- Of Human Bondage (1934) starring Leslie Howard and Bette Davis. Davis was nominated for an Academy Award for her performance which she considered her best.
- Break of Hearts (RKO 1935) starring Katharine Hepburn and Charles Boyer. This was based on Cohen’s original story and he also wrote the screenplay.

== Plays ==
- Of Human Bondage. Maugham gave Cohen worldwide dramatic rights to Bondage for the length of copyright (2004) presumably because Cohen had put him on the screen, a success that had eluded Maugham until then.
- House in Ohio with Diana Peckham.
- Coming Home, based on his novel.
- The Web and the Rock. This was the first dramatization done of a work by Thomas Wolfe. The play toured from 1949 to 1950.
- Benjamin Franklin: a play of America. Sold to television.
- Oscar Wilde (previously mentioned.)

== Magazine articles and stories ==
Cohen covered the 1956 political convention for Esquire Magazine, the near book-length piece was titled "You Are There: Convention 1956".

He wrote other articles for Esquire including studies of Estes Kefauver and Horace Liveright. (A book by Cohen, The Fabulous world of Horace Liveright, was never published and only exists in manuscript form.)

A long article, "Theodore Dreiser: a personal memoir" was based on Cohen’s long time friendship and appeared in Discovery 4. It was later republished and translated in other languages.

"The Man Who Laughed Too Much" with Arnold Gingrich, Esquire Magazine.

"Apply Kaliades or The Man Who Made a Deal", in Esquire, June 1956.

"Harlan Miners Speak Terrorism in the Kentucky Coal Fields, Report of the Dreiser Committee". Cohen wrote one of the pieces in the book put together by the Dreiser Committee published in 1932 by Harcourt Brace.

== TV appearance ==
Cohen was on the game show To Tell the Truth on December 12, 1960. He was one of the three men claiming to be Jack Benny's violin teacher. He received two votes: one from Johnny Carson and another from Polly Bergen, who first joked that none of the three guests were Jack Benny's real violin teacher because none of the three knew what song she sang as a guest on Jack's show, nor who was conducting Jack's orchestra that night!
