= John Cromwell (director) =

American film actor, director and producer

- Born: Elwood Dager; December 23, 1886; Toledo, Ohio, U.S.
- Died: September 26, 1979 (aged 92); Santa Barbara, California, U.S.
- Occupations: Director; actor
- Years active: 1912–1979
- Spouse(s): Alice Lindahl (m. 19??; died 1918) Marie Goff (m. 1919; div. 1921) Kay Johnson (m. 1928; div. 1946) Ruth Nelson (m. 1946)
- Children: 2, including James Cromwell
- Military Service
- Allegiance: United States
- Branch: United States Army
- Service years: September 26 – December 14, 1918
- Rank: Corporal
- Units: Co. G, 3rd Infantry Replenishment Regiment
- Conflicts: World War I
- Awards: Victory Medal

John Cromwell (born Elwood Dager; December 23, 1886 – September 26, 1979) was an American film and stage director and actor. His films spanned the early days of sound to film noir in the early 1950s, by which time his directing career was almost terminated by the Hollywood blacklist.

== Early life and education ==
Cromwell was born as Elwood Dager in Toledo, Ohio, to an affluent Anglo-Scottish family, executives in the steel and iron industry. Cromwell graduated from private high school at Howe Military Academy in 1905, but never pursued higher education.

=== Early acting career, 1905–1912 ===
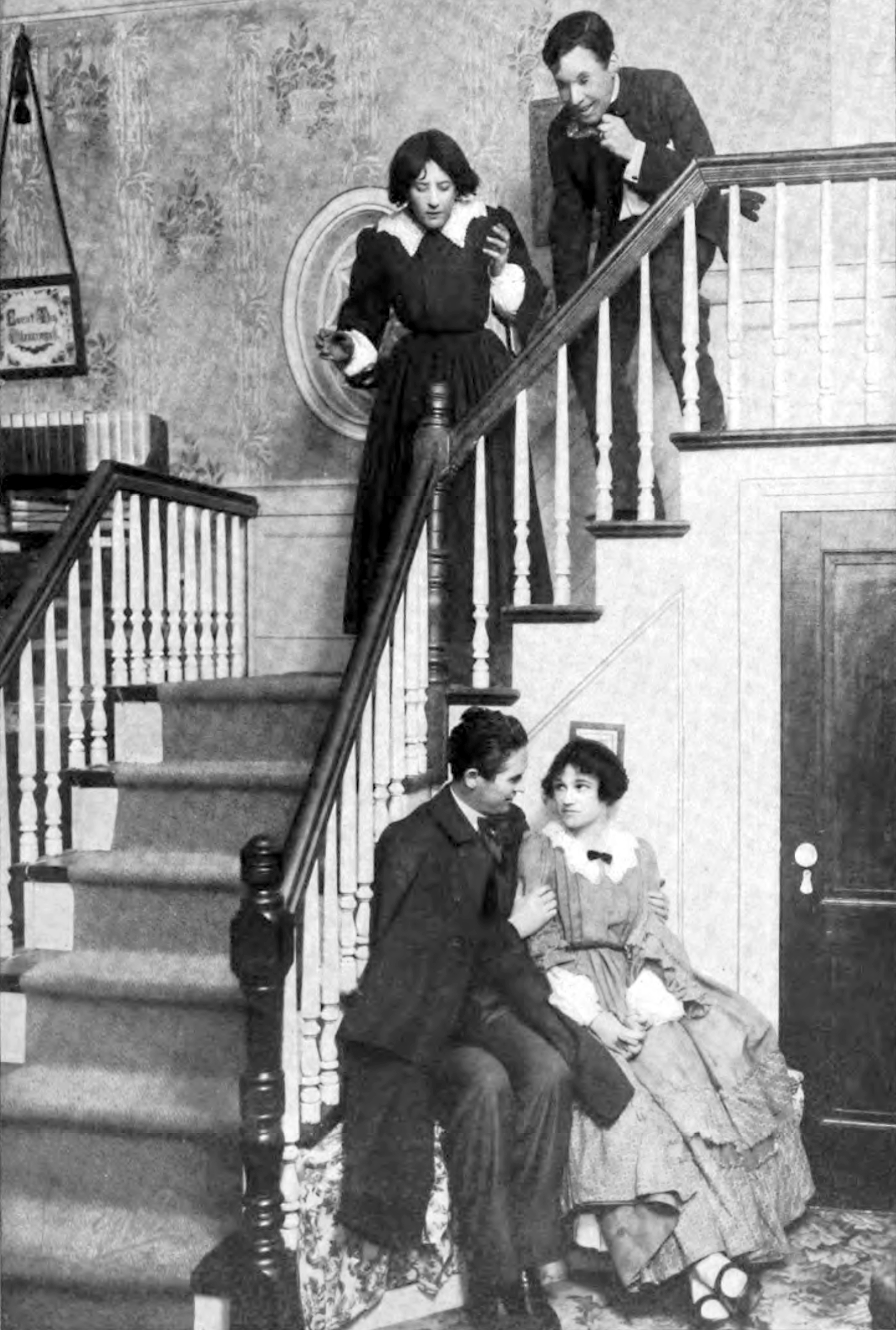
Cromwell (seated) as John Brooke with Alice Brady as Meg in the Broadway production of Little Women (1912)

Upon leaving school, Cromwell immediately began his stage career touring with stock companies in Chicago, then made his way to New York City in his early 20s. Billed as Elwood Dager in his youth, he changed his name to John Cromwell at the age of 26 following a 1912 New York stage appearance.

Cromwell made his Broadway debut in the role of John Brooke in Little Women (1912), an adaptation of Louisa May Alcott's novel. The production was an immediate hit and ran for 184 performances.

Throughout Cromwell's stage career, he worked in close collaboration with one of the outstanding Broadway producers of the day, William A. Brady. Indeed, virtually all of the stage productions Cromwell participated in before he began his film career were produced by Brady. The Painted Woman (1913) marked Cromwell's first assignment as stage director. Written by Frederic Arnold Kummer, the play closed in two days. By 1914, he was acting in and co-directing productions, including Too Many Cooks (1914), which ran for 223 performances.

In 1915, he joined the New York Repertory Company and performed in the American premieres of two George Bernard Shaw plays: Major Barbara in 1916, as the character Charles Lomax, and in a revival of Captain Brassbound's Conversion. Cromwell's stage career was interrupted by a brief stint in the U.S. Army during World War I.

By the 1920s, Cromwell had become a respected Broadway director, often in collaboration with co-directors Frank Craven or William Brady. Cromwell frequently performed on stage in this period which included works by future Pulitzer-Prize-winners Sidney Howard and Robert E. Sherwood. In 1927, Cromwell directed and played the lead in the gangster drama, The Racket, with newcomer Edward G. Robinson debuting in a tough-guy role of the type for which Robinson became known throughout his film career.

In 1928, Cromwell moved to Hollywood to serve as a dialogue director during the movie industry's transition to films with sound. Although Cromwell returned to Broadway in later years, his primary occupation after 1928 was as a movie director.

== Early film career ==
=== Paramount Famous Lasky, 1929 ===
Paramount Famous Lasky film producer B.P. Schulberg signed the 42-year-old Cromwell as a screen actor in October 1928 at the time of the industry-wide transition from silent productions to the new sound technology. After a satisfactory début performance in the 1929 early talkie The Dummy which featured Ruth Chatterton, Fredric March, Jack Oakie and ZaSu Pitts, Cromwell was invited to share directorial duties with Edward Sutherland, an experienced filmmaker.

Though Cromwell had never worked behind a camera, Paramount was eager to hire experienced stage directors "because of their presumed knowledge in handling dialogue." However erroneous this assumption, Cromwell and Sutherland enjoyed a productive collaboration completing two early talkies, both in 1929: Close Harmony, a jazz-band romance, and The Dance of Life, based on the George Mankers Watters play Burlesque (Sutherland's co-direction went uncredited in The Dance of Death). Cromwell had a minor acting role in each of these productions.

In a 1973 interview with Leonard Maltin, Cromwell offered a frank assessment of his difficulties adapting to the new medium as a movie director:

I never got accustomed to the terrific range of the camera and what the choice of a shot can do to a scene...[though] I was always very aware of composition. I had to rely enormously on my cameraman, especially at first. I was never able to learn much about lighting because it seems to me that every cameraman I had was so different from the last in his technique that it became almost impossible to learn unless you just took out time and devoted yourself to it. So I had to be completely at their mercy...But I was very lucky. I had some wonderful cameramen—wonderful in that they never let me down...men like Jimmy Howe, Charlie Lang, Arthur Miller.

During Cromwell's early films with Paramount, he was tasked with directing stage and film star George Bancroft, the studio's top property. Bancroft had performed in a number of successful silent films with Paramount's rising director Josef von Sternberg, culminating in a Best Actor nomination for Bancroft in Thunderbolt (1930). The Mighty (1930) was Cromwell's first of four pairings with Bancroft, and his first solo debut as director.

On his next film The Street of Chance, Cromwell formed a personal and professional bond with producer David O. Selznick in his first production, then an assistant to B.P. Schulberg. The picture, starring William Powell, Kay Francis and Jean Arthur, was a success at the box office.

=== Paramount-Publix, 1930–1931 ===
In 1930, Paramount Famous Lasky Corporation changed its name to Paramount Publix Corporation because of the growing importance of the Publix Theater chain.

The Texan (1930) was Cromwell's adaptation of the O. Henry short story "A Double-Dyed Deceiver" and starring Paramount's rising star Gary Cooper.

Paramount again enlisted actors Powell and Francis in Cromwell's For the Defense (also 1930), a legal drama involving a lawyer and his criminal fiancée. He directed the second cinematic version of Mark Twain's Tom Sawyer (also 1930) with Jackie Coogan starring as the eponymous Tom.

During 1931-1932, Cromwell fulfilled his commitments to direct Bancroft in three more films. Indeed, Cromwell had agreed to continue working with Bancroft only if Paramount arranged to let him direct Gary Cooper and Helen Hayes in an adaption of Hemingway's novel A Farewell to Arms, a project that eventually was directed by Frank Borzage.

The Bancroft films include Scandal Sheet, with co-star Clive Brook, Rich Man's Folly (both 1931), an adaption of Dickens' Dombey and Son and The World and the Flesh (also 1931), a romance set in revolutionary Russia. Cromwell's professional view of Bancroft's performance in Rich Man's Folly elicited these remarks:

[The role] should have been absolutely splendid for Bancroft except it required a consciousness of the material—of which he had none! To him it was always just another part to play in the same old manner...

Cromwell made three more pictures for Paramount-Publix, all released in 1931: Scandal Sheet, with Bancroft, Unfaithful, with Ruth Chatterton and The Vice Squad with Paul Lukas and Kay Francis.

During pre-production of the 1932 The World and the Flesh, a tale of the Bolshevik Revolution of 1917, Cromwell became disgusted with both the quality of the scenario, as well as the Paramount's sharp curtailment in rehearsal time. Cromwell's historical outlook and stage experience informed these following comments:

The World and the Flesh was the high point of degradation from my point of view. It was such an asinine, concocted story! I had personally taken an interest in the Russian Revolution, and had heard a great deal from a journalist...Lincoln Steffens who had been in Moscow at the time it happened...And so I had an idea of what chances there were to do a real picture. Then to have this...this almost disgusting tale, the same old hash served up as a script! I made up my mind that would be the last of it, I would try to get away."

In the early sound films the studios, having experience only with dialogue-free (silent) pictures, deferred to the Broadway dialogue-savvy stage directors, like Cromwell, who they enlisted during the transition to "talkies". In early production of For the Defense, Cromwell reports he was informed about a change in policy concerning rehearsals:

I set up the usual rehearsal schedule [of 2 1/2 weeks], but at the production meeting Schulberg said "We can't have anymore rehearsals, John." I asked him what he meant, and he continued: "It's a waste of time. The [film] directors don't know what to do with rehearsals..." I had noticed this too, but I had improved every minute of my time with rehearsals, so I said "Well, you know you don't have to do that with me, you know I don't waste my time." Schulberg replied "If I give you the privilege, they'll all want it, and that will just create a situation..."

Cromwell bargained with the producer, and they agreed to trade shooting days in exchange for rehearsal days. Cromwell recalled: "I think I ended up with four days rehearsal [by] cutting two days off the shooting schedule. Incredible! I couldn't believe it years afterwards."

== Radio-Keith-Orpheum (RKO): 1933–1935 ==
Cromwell's disaffection from Paramount led him to "walk off the lot" after The World and the Flesh, and with the help of his agent Myron Selznick, he moved to RKO. At the time, David O. Selznick was running RKO, and Cromwell recalled his professional experience there fondly: "RKO was always an endearing place to me; it had a distinct feeling of independence and individuality it never lost."

Cromwell was initially assigned by RKO to direct "a series of soap operas and films about family strife". Among these were Sweepings (1933), starring Lionel Barrymore in an unusually "restrained" performance. Cromwell directed The Silver Cord, an adaptation of a play he directed in 1926. His 1933 film adaptation concerns a young wife, Irene Dunne, who battles with her interfering mother-in-law Laura Hope Crews. The picture, which disparaged "motherhood", was considered audacious in its day.

Cromwell finished off this series with Double Harness (1933), "a shrewd and sophisticated interior drama" with Ann Harding and William Powell.

=== Ann Vickers (1933) ===
Cromwell filmed a then-controversial adaptation of the Sinclair Lewis novel Ann Vickers (1933). Irene Dunne played the eponymous character, a social reformer who exposes the degrading conditions in American prisons and has an affair with a jurist Walter Huston. Jane Murfin's screenplay reflected the characterizations in the Lewis novel, where Vickers is a "birth control advocate" who engages in an extramarital affair. The script drew the ire of the Production Code Administration and the Catholic Church. The Studio Relations Committee (SRC) chairman James Wingate called the script "vulgarly offensive". The SRC, overseeing the MPPDA, demanded an overhaul of the Murfin's script. RKO managers protested, and a compromise was reached when Dunne's character was relieved of adultery charges by a change in her marital status. Although awarded approval, the film helped spur the formation of the Production Code Administration, which later rigorously censored films for almost 25 years, largely under Catholic moral crusader Joseph Ignatius Breen.

=== Spitfire and This Man Is Mine (1934) ===
Cromwell's first two pictures of 1934 are considered "largely forgettable" according to author Michael Barson, beginning with a "miscast" Katharine Hepburn in Spitfire.

RKO's 26-year-old Hepburn as "Spitfire" (her pejorative sobriquet) was conceived as a "character study" rather than a genuine narrative, to showcase the rising young star. Based on the play Trigger by Lula Vollmer, Hepburn is improbably tasked with portraying an anti-social hillbilly-tomboy and faith healer in a rural backcountry community. Cromwell admitted that he was skeptical as to Hepburn's suitability for the part and objected to her contrived country accent. Hepburn herself tried unsuccessfully to get out of the film.

Cromwell, struggling with setting up his shots and conscious of avoiding cost overruns, disputed with Hepburn as to re-shooting of a key scene. The contretemps led to Cromwell's emphatic rejection of her requests and the director, "who did not like the film much", recalled that "I think those [disputes] were reflected in the picture." Nonetheless, Cromwell's visual compositions, along with the work of his cinematographer Edward Cronjager showcase Hepburn's "exuberant" performance, in which "her physical celebrations of the joys of life make this an eccentric and likeable film." Surprisingly, the film was successful at the box office.

Cromwell completed another soap opera with Irene Dunne and Ralph Bellamy, This Man is Mine (1934).

=== Of Human Bondage (1934) ===
Cromwell embarked on a film that proved to be highly offensive to the censors, but immensely popular among moviegoers: Of Human Bondage.

Although film historian John Baxter considers Cromwell's adaption of W. Somerset Maugham's novel Of Human Bondage "overrated", critic Jon Hopwood posited that the director "made his name" in Hollywood with this picture.

The film dramatizes forms of personal tyranny and obsession, in which an unsophisticated and heartless waitress, Mildred (Bette Davis) employs low-cunning to win the affection of a club-footed and self-effacing young medical student, Philip (Leslie Howard). The scenes are shot with great efficiency and effect in which "the camera movement seems to represent the emotional state of the characters." Cromwell adapted to studio budget limitations, employing the spartan interior sets to good effect in emphasizing the "unreality" of medical student's daily routines.

Bette Davis' Mildred saw the emergence of the actress in a "breakthrough" performance and "her first truly great film role." Davis' rendition fully conveys "the vulgarity and venality" of the character, impressing studios executives and audiences.

Like Cromwell's 1933 Ann Vickers, Of Human Bondage received the disapproval of the Production Code Administration (PCA), led by Catholic activist Joseph Breen. The PCA demanded a number of alterations to the scenario, among them that Mildred's diagnosis of syphilis be changed to tuberculosis, and that the coarseness of Davis' interpretation of the "slatternly waitress" be toned down. RKO readily complied under threat of a $25,000 fine per violation.

Despite studio executives' submitting to the censorship, Of Human Bondage was picketed in the major cities in the Midwestern United States by the Catholic National Legion of Decency. Perhaps in response to the reputation the film acquired by these demonstrations, the picture broke attendance records at Chicago's Hippodrome Theater with hundreds of moviegoers turned away. Nationwide, the movie enjoyed a tremendous box-office success.

As to Cromwell's successful handling of Davis' role, he was never labelled a "woman's director" (as were directors such as George Cukor). Nevertheless, his extensive experience as a stage performer endowed him a sympathy which elicited fine performances from his players, especially the women. Davis' performance was an early manifestation of this salutary influence.

"Whether by luck or design, Cromwell's eclectic career has been redeemed by the iconographical contributions of Irene Dunne, Katharine Hepburn, Bette Davis, Madeleine Carroll, Mary Astor, Carole Lombard... Fortunately, his formal deficiencies seldom obscure the beautiful drivers of Cromwell's vehicles."—Andrew Sarris (The American Cinema, 1968)

The last film released in 1934 directed by Cromwell was a post-WWI romantic drama The Fountain concerning an Englishwoman who must tell her devoted German husband returning from the war that she has fallen in love with her childhood sweetheart.

Film historian Kingsley Canham considers this a "key" film in Cromwell's oeuvre, showcasing the director's "elegance" and "assurance" in his handling of the décor and its relationship to performances.

The "restlessness and soul searching" of the expatriate wife Julie (Ann Harding) and her lover interned British flyer Lewis (Brian Aherne) is conveyed through camera movements, and with a minimum of dialogue. The "metaphysical" nature of this romance is made explicit by Cromwell's insertion of an excerpt from the English poet Coleridge's poem "Dejection". Canham praises The Fountain as "undoubtedly one of Cromwell's most outstanding achievements..."

After finishing Of Human Bondage, Cromwell enjoyed a pleasant interlude making Village Tale (1935), "one of Cromwell's favorite projects." Comprising a series of character studies, the picture features Guinn "Big Boy" Williams and Ann Dvorak. Jalna and I Dream Too Much(both 1935), represent a return to Cromwell's "soap opera" depictions of familial relations and marital strife. The director's wife Kay Johnson was featured in Jalna, and Henry Fonda starred in I Dream too Much.

== United Artists and 20th Century Fox, 1936–1939 ==
After his recent collaborations with Pandro S. Berman and other producers, Cromwell reunited with David O. Selznick, following him to United Artists and 20th Century Fox to make five films: Little Lord Fauntleroy (1936), To Mary – with Love (1936), Banjo on My Knee (1936), The Prisoner of Zenda (1937) and Algiers (1938).

David O. Selznick enlisted Cromwell to make a heavily invested re-make of the silent era film Little Lord Fauntleroy (1921)

The casting of child actor Freddy Bartholomew in the title role, according to Canham, was a masterstroke by Selznick and Cromwell's direction showcases the "sheer professionalism" of Bartholomew's acting abilities. Cromwell wisely selected his supporting cast from Hollywood's renowned "English Colony" of British expatriates. A film that emphasizes characterization over incident, Cromwell's handling of the camera endows the picture with a cinematic quality that avoids the impression of "filmed literature."

The first film created under Selznick International Pictures, Little Lord Fauntleroy was his most profitable production until Gone With the Wind (1939).

=== Banjo on My Knee (1936) ===
"To Cromwell, the work of the director was not to throw off individual sparks of creativity, but to fuse the efforts of the entire creative team for the best interests of the finished work. Such selflessness has always been rare in film-making, and Cromwell has long been overlooked by critics and historians alike.
But recent assessments of his work, notably such bitter late films as Caged and The Goddess, have established him as a director of substance as well as style, not merely the hired litteratuer of Paramount, RKO, or Selznick." – Biographer Richard Koszarski from Hollywood Directors: 1914-1940

Selznick tasked Cromwell with filming "another marital drama" released by 20th Century Fox studios with Claire Trevor the interloper and Myrna Loy and Warner Baxter as the happy couple. Banjo on My Knee (1936), set in the New Orleans and a comedy-of-errors interspersed with musical productions, included a fulsome rendition of W. C. Handy's "St. Louis Blues". The film bears similarities in setting and staging to director James Whale's Show Boat released the same year.

Cromwell, according to Canham, fails to cinematically develop the characters of co-stars Barbara Stanwyck and Joel McCrea and reduces the plebeian denizens of the Mississippi River Delta to caricatures.

Walter Brennan, was cast as the rural patriarch Newt Holley, who emerges as welcome comedy relief in a picture writes Canham where "nothing ever comes easily to the people in Cromwell's films and ambition often cloaks failure or death for commoners or even Ruritanian royalty."

=== The Prisoner of Zenda (1937) ===
In reviving novelist Anthony Hope's swashbuckler The Prisoner of Zenda, David O. Selznick took a calculated risk as to popular taste. That leading man Ronald Colman was under contract to Selznick was the key factor in proceeding with the project. The decision to pick John Cromwell as director was based on his demonstrated ability to handle actors, and his disciplined observance of budgetary restraints.

Despite Cromwell's skill with both male and female actors, an amusing contretemps arose during script and storyboard development. Ronald Colman (like screen actor John Barrymore) favored presenting just one facial profile to the camera to conceal his "bad side". Co-star Madeleine Carroll soon approached Cromwell, claiming a facial defect on the same side as Colman, meaning any face-to-face on-screen close-up would put one actor at disadvantage.

As director Cromwell remembered:

I called on Jimmy Howe [the cameraman] and asked him if [Carroll] had a bad side, and he said: "You couldn't fault her if you stood her on her head!" So I went back to her, pointing out how ridiculous it was and that we wouldn't be able to shoot the picture if she had the same [bad] side as Colman. After that, she would not speak to me for the rest of the picture.

Despite the generally "fluid style of the finished work" the authorship of several of the action scenes remain in question. Selznick was adamant about engaging directors George Cukor and Woody van Dyke to instill a sharper expressive element into the acting or to provide a more graphic presentation of the action episodes. Cromwell's widely recognized "visual elegance" may have influenced Selznick's "poor opinion of him as an action director." Both Cukor and Van Dyke went uncredited as was customary under Director's Guild rules.

Film critic Michael Barson considers Cromwell's The Prisoner of Zenda as the beginning of his "golden age" among Hollywood directors, and a production that deserves designation as a "classic".

=== Algiers (1938) ===
Algiers (1938), Cromwell's re-make of director Julien Duvivier's French thriller Pepe Le Moko (1936), launched the Hollywood careers of two European actors: Charles Boyer and Hedy Lamarr. Cromwell elicited a fine performance from Boyer as an international thief who matches wits with the local police inspector played by Joseph Calleia, attempting to lure the French fugitive from his refuge in the "Casbah", the native quarter of Algiers. The dialogue, "tight and logical", was crafted by John Howard Lawson, with contributions from novelist-screenwriter James M. Cain. Cromwell and his cinematographer James Wong Howe successfully manufactured a "polished" facsimile of Duvivier's original for producer Walter Wanger.

Cromwell strained to extract an impressive American acting debut from the Austrian Lamarr, whom Wanger wished to mold into a "second Garbo". Cromwell recalled:

I could sense her inadequacy [as an actor], Wanger could sense it, and I could see Boyer getting worried...Sometimes the word personality is interchangeable with presence although they aren't the same thing. But the principle applies, and Hedy also had no personality. How could they think she could become a second Garbo?...Well, we got the picture going, and we did all right. The critics saw she couldn't act, but she got by, and they sold the picture by gushing how beautiful she was. I'll take some credit for making her acting passable but can only share credit with Boyer fifty-fifty.

Cromwell made an aborted attempt to direct producer Sam Goldwyn's The Adventures of Marco Polo (ultimately completed by director Archie Mayo and John Ford in 1938), followed briefly by a return to the stage to direct Fredric March and Florence Eldridge.

=== Made for Each Other and In Name Only: Carole Lombard, 1939 ===
While Selznick was deeply immersed in pre-production for Gone with the Wind (1939), he engaged Cromwell to direct Carole Lombard and James Stewart in the romantic comedy Made for Each Other (1939). The simple narrative of young newlyweds struggling with both "the trivial and the traumatic" provided a platform to showcase Cromwell's adept handling of the cast.

Lombard was eager for a role with dramatic potential (she had been designated as "The Queen of the Screwball comedy" in her earlier roles). She benefited from the straightforward script "that allowed for a great deal of insight into the characters, and for an unusual amount of flexibility in the cast's playing." Lombard's dramatic interpretation of wife Jane Mason emerges as "casual and very human." Stewart is perfectly suited to the role of the unassertive yet endearing young husband in need of the tactful guidance of his more mature spouse.

A distinct critical success, but undistinguished at the box-office, Cromwell was delighted to have the opportunity to direct Lombard in his next feature film: In Name Only (1939). Another production in a genre that Cromwell was well-equipped to present—the marital melodrama—Lombard plays "the other woman" to the wealthy Cary Grant, trapped in an unhappy marriage with the possessive Kay Francis.

Lombard's Julie, a widow, suffering from "shattered illusions" of ever possessing Grant, must first abandon all hope before Fate intervenes on her behalf. Grant retains his "natural flippancy" to deliver a number of comic scenes which avoids undermining his character's credibility, and Kay Francis' obsessive matron agrees to give Grant a divorce with this malignant invective: "I hope you'll both be miserable!" Cromwell's overall grasp of the dramatic atmosphere serves to blend the performances and "nearly brings it off."

Historian Kingley Canham offers an insight into Cromwell's handling of "romantic illusions" inherent to melodramatic narratives:

Reality is ever present in Cromwell's work, surfacing even in his lightest offerings...the director's attitude to his 'soap opera' material differs from other artists [such as] Cukor, Borzage and Stahl...in that he is basically anti-romantic, playing down sentimentality and opting for realism and practicality instead.

=== Abe Lincoln in Illinois (1940) ===
RKO executives tasked Cromwell with adapting playwright Robert Sherwood's play Abe Lincoln in Illinois, which had been produced to great acclaim on Broadway in 1938. The Pulitzer Prize-winning stage production concerned the early career of US President Abraham Lincoln, who led the Union forces to victory in the American Civil War. The unfolding war in Europe and the Far East gave special resonance to the subject matter.

Despite the fact that 20th Century Fox was well-advanced in producing a John Ford picture starring Henry Fonda that dramatized the same events in Lincoln's life, this did not deter bids for the film rights to the Sherwood's historical drama and independent producer Max Gordon financed its purchase for $250,000, to be filmed by RKO studios. Stage actor Raymond Massey, who played the role of Lincoln in the Broadway production was selected, with Sherwood's fulsome approval, to perform in the screen role of Abe Lincoln in Illinois.

Cromwell's characterization of Lincoln is distinct from that of the Ford's in Young Mr. Lincoln (1939). Whereas Ford presents a mythological figure who rises from a humble rural lawyer to the most exalted position in the nation, Cromwell's relies less on iconography and emphasizes historic details which reveal Lincoln's early character as less exalted: "Raymond Massey [emerges] as a far less confident Lincoln than Henry Fonda."

The presentation of Lincoln's historical relationship with Ann Rutledge (played by May Howard) is used by Cromwell to establish aspects of Lincoln's essential character and avoids Ford's romantization of Rutledge in Young Abe Lincoln, which features a sentimental graveside eulogy.

Actor Ruth Gordon, in her debut screen appearance as the future Mrs. Lincoln, provides a key antidote to Cromwell's callow Lincoln who is lazy, skeptical and lacking in ambition. Gordon's Mary Todd forthrightly sets about preparing Lincoln to face his destiny in anticipation of marrying him, providing "a remarkably astute cinematic interpretation." Cinematographer James Wong Howe's lighting and camera work effectively documents the transformation in Lincoln that earned Howe an Oscar nomination.

=== Victory (1940) ===
As early as 1919, Cromwell had taken a keen interest in novelist Joseph Conrad's psychological drama Victory: An Island Tale (1915), concerning an English expatriate who attempts to withdraw as a recluse to a small Indonesian island. His solitary existence is undone when he rescues a young woman, leading to the infiltration of his sanctuary by a gang of sociopaths, with tragic results. Cromwell personally contacted Conrad shortly after publication of Victory to obtain production and dramatic rights to the work, only to discover that permission had been bestowed on producer Laurence Irving and McDonald Hastings, respectively. Cromwell directed a version of their adaptation in the United States in the 1920s that quickly folded.

Twenty years later, Cromwell filmed his screen version, Victory (1940), for Paramount with Fredric March as the recluse Hendrik Heyst and Betty Field as Alma, and Cedric Hardwicke as the pathological Mr. Jones (also serving as narrator). Cromwell's professional relationship with March had commenced on Broadway in 1925 when he directed March in Kay Horton's Harvest.

Cromwell was dissatisfied with some of the casting in Victory, particularly with that of British actor Cedric Hardwicke :

Then [there was] Mr. Hardwicke, whom I knew—or thought I knew—pretty well. I don't know what the hell happened to him. He just conked out on me entirely, and I felt he gave no indication what the part was about…there seemed to be no effort on his part.

Cromwell considered his next project more satisfactory. In Cromwell's film adaptation, So Ends Our Night (1941), an adaption of the Erich Maria Remarque novel Flotsam (1939), Fredric March plays an anti-Nazi fugitive pursued by fascist Austrian authorities. In his flight he encounters other exiles, played by Glenn Ford and Margaret Sullavan, and his freedom is only achieved through an ultimate sacrifice. Erich von Stroheim appears in a supporting role as Nazi SS officer Brenner.

Cromwell was particularly pleased with the script by Talbot Jennings, and although the picture was not a commercial success, Cromwell considered So Ends the Night "one of my best."

=== Son of Fury (1942) ===
Cromwell's disparaged his next assignment, Son of Fury, as strictly "a studio project." Financed generously by 20th Century Fox but controlled at every phase to ensure its commercial success, Cromwell was limited to using its "lavish sets" by Darryl F. Zanuck to manufacture "a stock 20th Century Fox costume" period-piece.

The protagonist, Benjamin Blake, heir to a baronetcy, is played by child actor Roddy McDowell as a youth, then by Tyrone Power in adulthood. Curiously, although a time lapse shows the juvenile Blake's transformation from boy to man, his uncle Sir Arthur Blake George Sanders shows no discernible signs of aging.

Cromwell recalled enjoying his work with leading man Tyrone Power "and particularly with [co-star] Gene Tierney" as he "never saw her in a film I liked until Son or Fury and I think that was because I worked so hard to get her to stop acting and be simple."

Historian Kingsley Canham issued this judgement on Cromwell's direction of the picture:

Son of Fury contains the two extremes of Cromwell's career, [and] unfortunately, in the confrontation between good taste, a lavish budget and atmospheric characterization on the one hand and subservience to studio influence on the other, the latter proves to be the stronger factor.

=== Since You Went Away (1944) ===
As part of his promotion of his protégé, 25-year-old Jennifer Jones, Selznick enlisted Cromwell to direct a paean to the American family during wartime, Since You Went Away (1944).

Film historian Kingley Canham describes Since You Went Away as "undoubtedly one of the most superior, polished and effective wartime propaganda works to emerge from the cinema during the Second World War." Selznick, dissatisfied with the screenplay written by author Margaret Buell Wilder, overhauled it to create a celebration of the American homefront as an “impregnable fortress” sustaining the US war effort.

The cast features Claudette Colbert, Shirley Temple, Joseph Cotten, Lionel Barrymore, Robert Walker and Agnes Moorehead. Cromwell's handling of the scenes establish, writes Canham "a warmth and conviction" that surpasses perfunctory performances. Despite Selznick's usual heavy involvement in the production, Cromwell's deployment of the cast and technicians was such that "his reputation as a Hollywood professional could have survived entirely on the strength of Since You Went Away."

A commercial as well as critical success, the film received nine Oscar nominations - including Best Picture, virtually the entire cast and all technical credits - but winning only one, for Max Steiner's score.

=== The Enchanted Cottage (1945) and Anna and the King of Siam (1946) ===
Cromwell returned to RKO to make one of his most personally gratifying pictures, The Enchanted Cottage (1945), a remake of director John S. Robertson's 1924 silent film production, both based on Arthur Wing Pinero's 1921 play of the same name.

A romantic fantasy, “handled with perception and feeling” by Cromwell, tells the story (presented in flashbacks) of a disfigured combat veteran Robert Young returning from the Second World War and an "ugly duckling" maiden Dorothy McGuire, who marry and together discover the transformative power of love. Pianist and composer Herbert Marshall, blinded in the war, contributes to their personal triumph.

Returning to 20th Century Fox, Cromwell embarked on another satisfying project, Anna and the King of Siam (1947), "a demonstration of Cromwell's craftsmanship" earning Oscars for cinematography and art direction. The 1944 story by author Margaret Landon is based on the memoirs of Anglo-Indian Anna Leonowens, who served as governess for King Mongkut of Siam (now Thailand) in the 1860s. The King is played by Rex Harrison and the governess by Irene Dunne. Her task is to tutor his numerous children sired with his harem, and "guide the King in matters of state and household" informed by her petty bourgeois sensibilities. Cromwell avoids both minor comedy relief and spectacle, concentrating on character development of the King and Anna.

A success at the box-office and the Academy Awards, the Leonowens tale appeared as a Rodgers and Hammerstein Broadway musical in 1951 and on film in The King and I (1956).

RKO assigned Cromwell the drama Night Song (1948) starring Dana Andrews and Merle Oberon concerning a wealthy society woman who strives to advance the career of a blind pianist. Termed “a disaster [and] an unbelievable film” the picture's only saving grace is a cameo appearance by Arthur Rubinstein performing at the piano.

During the post-World War II period, Cromwell's created a number of films that are considered film noir and reflect the director's frame-up as a Fellow-traveler accused of Communist sympathies by the House Un-American Activities Committee investigators and Hollywood executives during the emerging McCarthyite era. Cromwell claimed that "I was never anything that suggested a Red, and there never was the slightest evidence with which to accuse me of being one." Nevertheless, Cromwell was blacklisted by the Hollywood film industry from 1952 to 1958.

=== Dead Reckoning (1947): Columbia Pictures ===
Warner Bros. studios, with top film star Humphrey Bogart under contract, reluctantly agreed to an actor exchange with Harry Cohn's Columbia Pictures, making Bogart available for a limited period of time to the rival studio. Bogart had the option of picking his director and screenplay, and settled on Cromwell. Cromwell recalled his earliest encounter with the actor in the 1922 Broadway production of Drifting in which Bogart was cast in the roles of Ernie Crockett and The Third Husband:

I had put Humphrey Bogart on stage when he was a kid; he used to hang around the Playhouse Theater [and] sat in on rehearsals…[once when a featured player failed to show] somebody thought of Bogart, who was at the time the most responsible, the most charming [of the young player prospects]. He was, of course, goggled-eyed to do it, and I think he said to me once: "Mr. Cromwell...Do I face the audience when I speak my lines or do I talk to the characters?" I went through all these things with him, but the play was an awful flop.

In Dead Reckoning (1947), Bogart portrays a hardened WWII veteran who engages in a deadly pursuit to locate the murderer of a comrade-in-arms. Lizabeth Scott serves as the noir femme-fatale. The often incoherent narrative reflects Cromwell's struggle to make sense of the disconcerting script. Cromwell recalled:

We had no story. [The screenwriters] provided the usual pile of stuff they always had handy to see whom they could pass it off on...I finally got this one, a noxious sort of thing, but I felt perhaps that [Bogart and I] could make something of it.

Despite these conceptual limitations, Cromwell achieves a level of coherency that delivers a vigorous film in the noir style.

== Hollywood and the House Un-American Activities Committee (HUAC) ==
During the House Un-American Activities Committee (HUAC) 1947 investigations into the film industry, John Cromwell was identified as a person of interest linked to supposed Communist subversion in Hollywood. Cromwell described himself as "a 'liberal' Democrat" and avers he did not become politically active until the re-election campaign for US President Franklin Delano Roosevelt's third run for the White House in 1940. Most of this, according to Cromwell, was limited to collecting membership dues for the Hollywood Democratic Committee which consisted of "3,000 members". In a 1973 interview with film historian Leonard Maltin for Action magazine, Cromwell recounted studio efforts to undermine his work during the anti-Communist witch-hunts:

I began to feel the pressure alright...I had asked my agent to find out whether I was on a list of 200 names [of suspected Communists] which was supposed to be universally circulated in all the big studios, and he did what he could to find out, and said: "Absolutely not!" And I felt this was virtually a clearance because my name was on the local state [of California] list and had cropped up very often. So I got the contract from RKO.

Cromwell's agent had negotiated an excellent film contract, but within weeks RKO was purchased by film producer and anti-Communist Howard Hughes. As Cromwell remembered, "the complete freedom from inter-studio politics went up in smoke." He said that the change in ownership caused an exodus of screenwriters and technicians from the studios whose "reputations" were perceived by Hollywood executives as "tinged" with sympathies for Communism: the writers "knew it was useless to stay there".

Remaining under contract, Cromwell decided to persevere at RKO, confident that "they could not harm me much". On the contrary, Cromwell discerned a conscious effort to force him out when RKO executives presented him with an ultimatum: accept studio dictated screenplays and scripts, or violate his contract. Cromwell was convinced that a screenwriter had approached Hughes, urging him to buy the rights of a story that was so repellent to Cromwell the director would be compelled to reject it—providing RKO grounds for terminating his lucrative agreement. Cromwell describes his dilemma:

They just sent me a script and said ‘this will be your next assignment. I looked at the script and the name was I Married a Communist and I thought this was kind of funny...I never read such a bad script in my life; the more I thought about it, the more convinced I became that it could never be made...[but] I decided to stick it out.

Cromwell reports that the studio immediately assigned a screenwriter to the pre-production team who was "one of the worst [anti-Communist] 'witch-hunters' in Hollywood, and I saw that this was pretty deliberate". Multiple screenwriters were tasked with developing a workable script from the flawed story. They came to loggerheads with Cromwell, finally convincing RKO management that it was "logically" impossible to make the picture. When delays in production threatened to trigger the "triple-salary" provision in Cromwell's contract, RKO loaned Cromwell to Warner Bros. to make Caged. The final film, eventually released in 1949, had to be retitled The Woman on Pier 13.

=== Caged (1950) ===
Cromwell's noir picture Caged (1950) is an indictment of an American social and sexual hierarchy set in the microcosm of a woman's prison. Among Cromwell's "bitterest films", historian Kingsley Canham describes its formulation:

It builds up in a progression of accusations structured in terms of their importance. Men are seen as woman's downfall; harsh treatment in prison brutalizes them; official indifference and chicanery prevents liberal aid; and their corruption is completed by their contact with the hardened criminals who are themselves victims.

A Warner Brothers production, Cromwell adopted the visual effects, subject matter and dramatic music characteristic of the studio's pictures, including its “hard-boiled” dialogue.

At the center of Cromwell's work—and “casting against type”—are the performances by Eleanor Parker, Agnes Moorehead, Hope Emerson, Betty Garde and Lee Patrick, through whom he “makes his case”.

Cromwell returned to RKO (with John Houseman producing) in the studios’ bid to duplicate the success of Caged, again a crime drama, where Dennis O'Keefe is the love object of Jane Greer and Lizabeth Scott: The Company She Keeps (1951). Cromwell failed to fully make use of the talented cast and to effectively dramatize the confusing script.

=== The Racket (1951) ===
Cromwell's last film before his expulsion by the Hollywood studios under the anti-Communist blacklist was The Racket (1951). The play by Bartlett Cormack had been produced on Broadway in 1927, with Cromwell in the leading role of Capt. McQuigg (with future film star Edward G. Robinson in a bit part). In the 1928 silent film adaption of the play directed by Lewis Milestone and produced by the 22-year-old Howard Hughes, Robinson is elevated to the role of gangster Nick Scanlon for this silent film version. Robert Mitchum reprises the role of the honest police Captain Thomas McQuigg, the same character director Cromwell had performed on Broadway in 1927.

Cromwell's film version is a dark and pessimistic noir that parades the gangsterism of "the business corporation structure…the brainless thugs...the crooked bail bondsmen and cops and corrupt judges to the unseen 'Man' at the top." The film, which includes suspenseful and effective fight scenes delivers "capable entertainment".

As familiar with the material as Cromwell was, RKO's Howard Hughes rejected his final cut and enlisted director Nicholas Ray to shoot additional scenes. Cromwell is reported to have walked off the set in disgust. Due to his blacklisting by the Hollywood studios, Cromwell did not work in the film industry again until later in the decade.

=== The Goddess (1958) ===
During the years of forced studio inactivity beginning in 1952, Cromwell's only engagement in Hollywood was a small acting role in Top Secret Affair (1957), directed by H.C. Potter and starring Kirk Douglas and Susan Hayward. Historian Kingsley Canham reports that the erstwhile director was "active in the theater" during these intervening years. Cromwell was enticed to return to film directing when Columbia Pictures promised him the option make "first cut" on the proposed feature. The Goddess (1958) was his last major cinematic work, and "in many respects one of his best films."

The story and script by dramatist Paddy Chayefsky details the tragic rise and fall of a fictitious Hollywood actress, Emily Ann Faulkner/Rita Shawn. Cromwell chose to present the saga in three chronological and dramatic episodes: "Portrait of a Young Girl, Maryland 1930" (Faulkner played by the 9-year-old Patty Duke), "Portrait of a Young Woman," and "Portrait of a Goddess” (the later two performed by Kim Stanley).

Cromwell uses the film as a platform on which to "bitterly parody the emotionalism of his earlier films", linking the episodes together by the repetition of fragments of dialogue from the characters that "echo" throughout the film.

The Goddess emerges as Cromwell's reckoning with the Hollywood film industry. The characterization of Emily Ann Faulkner and Rita Shawn emerge as an indictment of the Hollywood system. Film historian Kingsley Canham observes:

Cromwell's heroine is both victim and monster; she is allowed an ambiguity of character that many of his villainesses share, but he shows no mercy or pity for the mechanics of the film industry whom he indicts for her downfall. The film offers him an opportunity to vent his love/hate relationship for a lifetime in the film industry.

Cromwell discovered that his “first cut” rights were inadequate to preserve his work, and in subsequent editing effected through the efforts of writer Chayefsky, The Goddess was reduced to half its original length. Cromwell ultimately walked off the project.

Cromwell's film career closed with two lackluster films: The Scavengers (1959) starring Vince Edwards and Carol Ohmart, made in the Philippines, and a low-budget drama, A Matter of Morals (1961), made in Sweden with Maj-Britt Nilsson and Patrick O’Neal.

== Life after Hollywood ==
Cromwell devoted the rest of his career primarily to the theater where he had begun. He wrote three plays, all staged in New York; starred opposite Helen Hayes in a revival of What Every Woman Knows, directed the original Broadway company of Desk Set, and eventually found artistic satisfaction in four seasons at the Tyrone Guthrie theater in Minneapolis, founded by the expatriate British director in 1963 when he, like Cromwell, had grown disenchanted with Broadway's increasing commercialism.

Cromwell was cast by Robert Altman in the role of Mr. Rose for the film 3 Women (1977) starring Shelley Duvall and Sissy Spacek, and as Bishop Martin in A Wedding (1978) starring Desi Arnaz, Jr., Carol Burnett, Geraldine Chaplin, Mia Farrow, Vittorio Gassman and Lillian Gish. His wife Ruth Nelson also appeared in both Altman films.

== Personal life ==
Cromwell married four times. His first wife, stage actress Alice Lindahl died of influenza in 1918. He and stage actress Marie Goff divorced. Cromwell next married actress Kay Johnson in 1928, divorcing in 1946. His final marriage, to actress Ruth Nelson in 1947, lasted until his death in 1979. Cromwell and Johnson had two sons; one is actor James Cromwell.

== Death ==
He died at age 92 in Santa Barbara, California, of a pulmonary embolism.

== Filmography ==
Year	Title	Credited as		
Year	Title	Director	Actor	Role
1929	The Dummy		Yes	Walter Babbing
1929	Close Harmony	Yes		
1929	The Dance of Life	Yes	Yes	Doorkeeper
1929	The Mighty	Yes	Yes	Mr. Jamieson
1930	Street of Chance	Yes	Yes	Imbrie
1930	The Texan	Yes		
1930	For the Defense	Yes	Yes	Second Reporter at Trial
1930	Tom Sawyer	Yes		
1931	Scandal Sheet	Yes		
1931	Unfaithful	Yes		
1931	The Vice Squad	Yes		
1931	Rich Man's Folly	Yes		
1932	The World and the Flesh	Yes		
1932	Hell's Highway	Yes		
1933	Sweepings	Yes		
1933	The Silver Cord	Yes		
1933	Double Harness	Yes		
1933	Ann Vickers	Yes	Yes	Sad-Faced Doughboy
1934	Spitfire	Yes		
1934	This Man Is Mine	Yes		
1934	Of Human Bondage	Yes		
1934	The Fountain	Yes		
1935	Village Tale	Yes		
1935	Jalna	Yes		
1935	I Dream Too Much	Yes		
1936	Little Lord Fauntleroy	Yes		
1936	To Mary - with Love	Yes		
1936	Banjo on My Knee	Yes		
1937	The Prisoner of Zenda	Yes		
1938	Algiers	Yes		
1939	Made for Each Other	Yes		
1939	In Name Only	Yes		
1940	Abe Lincoln in Illinois	Yes	Yes	John Brown
1940	Victory	Yes		
1941	So Ends Our Night	Yes		
1942	Son of Fury: The Story of Benjamin Blake	Yes		
1944	Since You Went Away	Yes		
1945	The Enchanted Cottage	Yes		
1945	Watchtower Over Tomorrow	Yes		
1946	Anna and the King of Siam	Yes		
1947	Dead Reckoning	Yes		
1948	Night Song	Yes		
1950	Caged	Yes		
1951	The Company She Keeps	Yes	Yes	Policeman
1951	The Racket	Yes		
1954	Producers' Showcase		Yes	Jim Conover
1955	Ponds Theater		Yes	Mr. Lattimer
1956	Studio One in Hollywood		Yes	Senator Harvey Rogers
1957	Top Secret Affair		Yes	General Daniel A. Grimshaw
1958	The Goddess	Yes		
1959	The Scavengers	Yes		
1961	A Matter of Morals	Yes		
1977	3 Women		Yes	Mr. Rose
1978	A Wedding		Yes	Bishop Martin

== Stage career ==
From 1912 to 1928.

Year	Title	Credited as		
Year	Title	Director	Actor	Role
1912	Little Women		Yes	John Brooke (Broadway debut)
1913	The Painted Woman	Yes		
1914	Too Many Cooks	Yes w/Frank Craven	Yes	Mr. Jamieson
1914	LIfe	Yes w/William A. Brady		
1915	Sinners	Yes		
1915	The New York Idea	Yes	Yes	William Ludley
1915	Major Barbara		Yes	Charles Lomax
1916	The Earth	Yes		
1916	Captain Brassbound's Conversion		Yes	Captain Kearney, USN
1917	The Land of the Free	Yes w/Frank Craven		
1919	At 9:45	Yes		
1919	She Would and She Did	Yes	Yes	Frank Groward
1920	Immodest Violet		Yes	Mr. Tackaberry
1920	Young Visitors	Yes		
1921	The Teaser	Yes	Yes	Ruddy Caswell
1921	Personality		Yes	Simpson
1921	Marie Antoinette	Yes w/Grace George	Yes	Maillard
1921	Bought and Paid For	Yes		
1922	Drifting	Yes		
1922	The Lawbreaker		Yes	Walter Homer
1922	Manhattan	Unk		
1922	The World We Live In	Yes		
1923	Tarnish	Yes		
1924	Bewitched	Producer only		
1925	She Had To Know	Yes		
1925	It All Depends	Producer w/William A. Brady		
1925	Harvest	Yes		
1925	Sam McCarver	Producer w/William A. Brady	Yes	Sam McCarver
1926	Little Eyolf		Yes	Engineer Borgheim
1926	Devils	Yes	Yes	Matthew Dibble
1926	Kitty's Kisses	Yes		
1926	Fanny		Yes	Gyp Gradyear
1926	The Silver Cord	Yes		
1927	Women Go On For Ever	Producer w/William A. Brady		
1927	The Racket		Yes	Capt. McQuigg
1928	The Queen's Husband	Yes		
1928	Gentlemen of the Press		Yes	Wick Snell
