= Walter Plunkett =

American costume designer

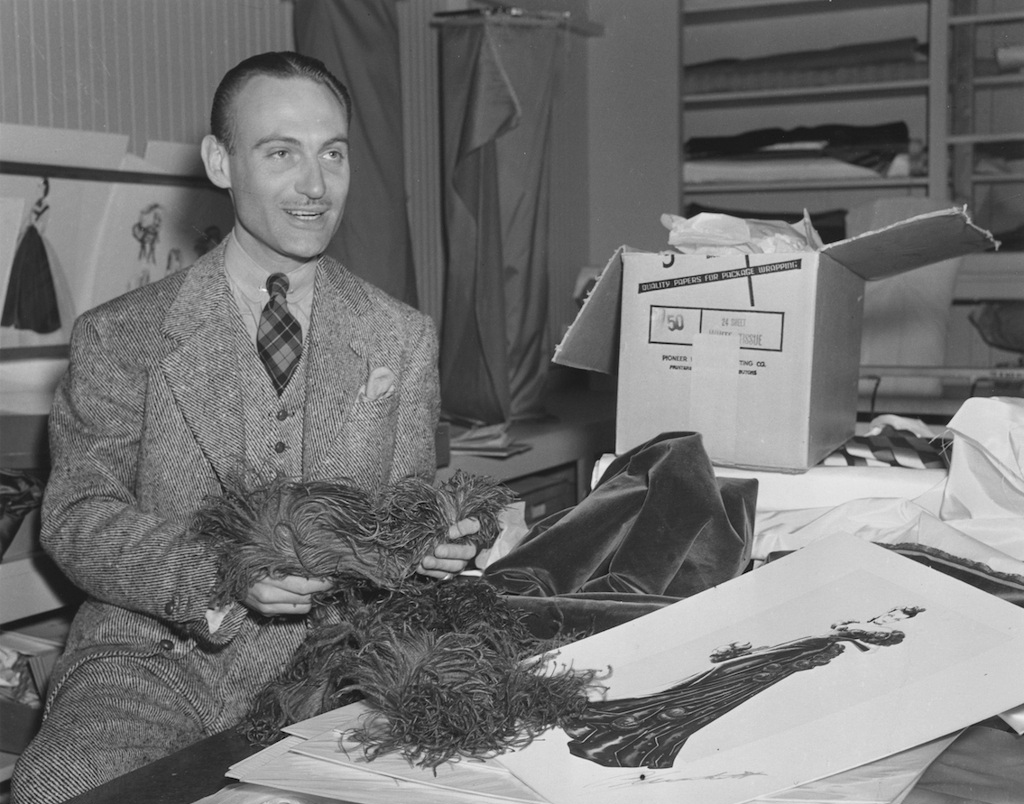
- Plunkett with the red dress of Gone with the Wind (1939)
- Born: June 5, 1902; Oakland, California, U.S.
- Died: March 8, 1982 (aged 79); Santa Monica, California, U.S.
- Occupation: costume designer
- Years active: 1927–1966

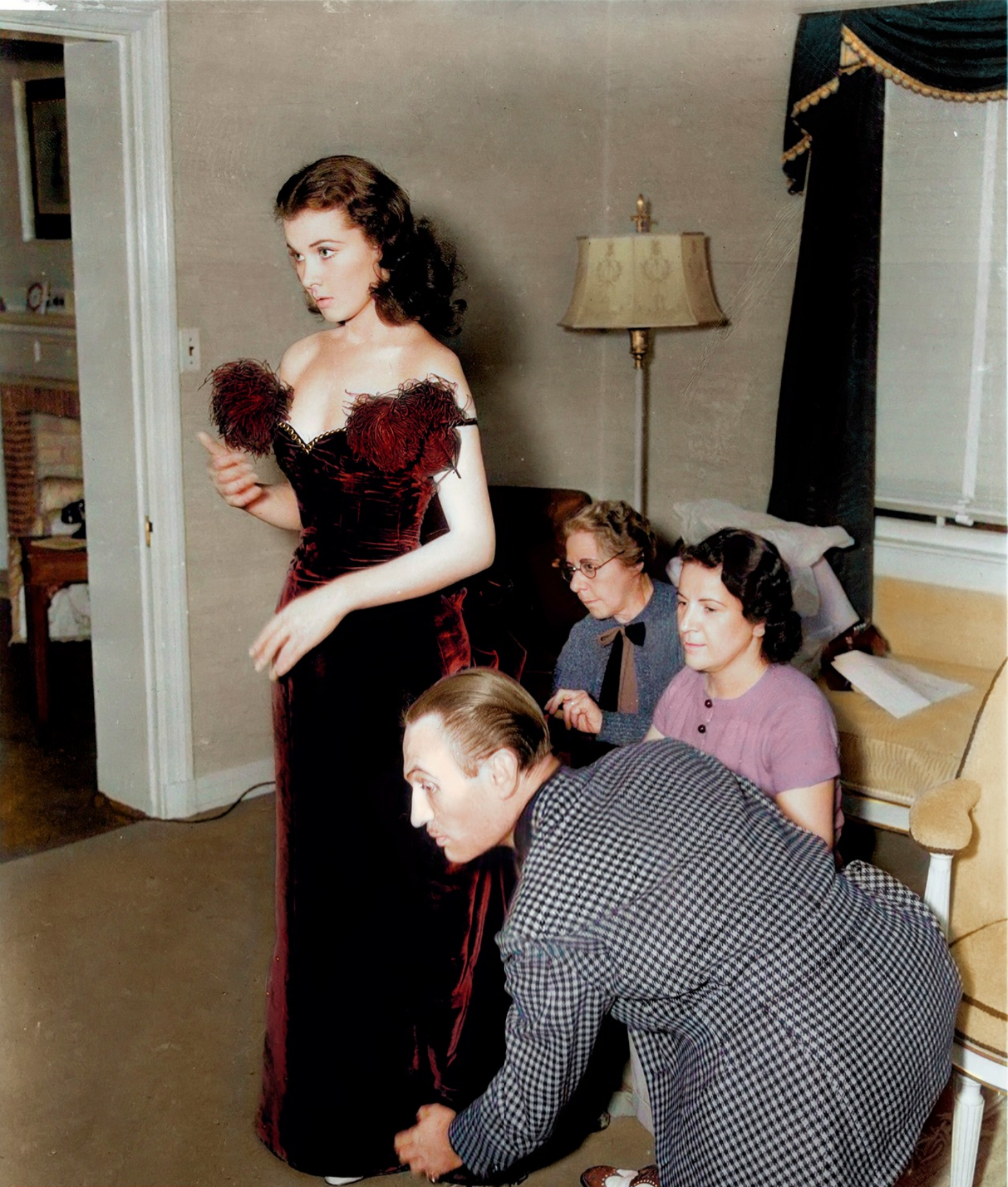
Vivien Leigh and Plunkett during a fitting

Walter Plunkett (June 5, 1902 in Oakland, California – March 8, 1982) was a prolific costume designer who worked on more than 150 projects throughout his career in the Hollywood film industry.

Born in Oakland, California, Plunkett studied law at the University of California, where he was a member of the California-Alpha chapter of Sigma Phi Epsilon fraternity, but showed greater interest in the school's theatrical group. He moved to New York City in 1923 and began work as a stage actor as well as a costume and set designer. After some time in Greenwich Village, he moved back to California, this time to Hollywood, and found work as a movie extra. (He can be seen dancing with Irene, another future top designer, in Erich von Stroheim's 1925 film The Merry Widow.) He soon made a career change to costume and wardrobe.

Plunkett's first credited work as a costume designer was the 1927 film Hard-Boiled Haggerty. At RKO, he developed a huge costume and wardrobe department that became a major studio asset. Given free rein, he set about creating costumes that rivaled the work of his contemporaries, such as Travis Banton and Adrian.

Plunkett's best-known work is featured in two films, Gone with the Wind (1939) and Singin' in the Rain (1952), in which he lampooned his initial style of the Roaring Twenties.

In 1951, Plunkett shared an Academy Award for Best Costume Design with Orry-Kelly and Irene Sharaff for An American in Paris.

Plunkett retired in 1966, after having worked in films, on Broadway, and for the Metropolitan Opera. He spent the last years of his life with his long-term partner, Lee, whom he formally adopted so that he could inherit his estate. He died at age 79 in Santa Monica, California.

== Filmography ==
- Hard-Boiled Haggerty (1927)
- Sinners in Love (1928)
- Love in the Desert (1929)
- The Red Sword (1929)
- Rio Rita (1929)
- Dixiana (1930)
- The Most Dangerous Game (1932)
- Night After Night (1932)
- The Animal Kingdom (1932)
- The Past of Mary Holmes (1933)
- King Kong (1933)
- Christopher Strong (1933)
- Double Harness (1933)
- Morning Glory (1933)
- Little Women (1933)
- The Right to Romance (1933)
- The Son of Kong (1933)
- Flying Down to Rio (1933)
- Hips, Hips, Hooray! (1934)
- Spitfire (1934)
- Where Sinners Meet (1934)
- Sing and Like It (1934)
- Finishing School (1934)
- Strictly Dynamite (1934)
- Stingaree (1934)
- The Life of Vergie Winters (1934)
- Murder on the Blackboard (1934)
- Let's Try Again (1934)
- Of Human Bondage (1934)
- Cockeyed Cavaliers (1934)
- We're Rich Again (1934)
- His Greatest Gamble (1934)
- Bachelor Bait (1934)
- The Fountain (1934)
- Down to Their Last Yacht (1934)
- The Age of Innocence (1934)
- The Gay Divorcee (1934)
- Wednesday's Child (1934)
- Kentucky Kernels (1934)
- By Your Leave (1934)
- Anne of Green Gables (1934)
- The Silver Streak (1934)
- Dangerous Corner (1934)
- Lightning Strikes Twice (1934)
- The Little Minister (1934)
- The Informer (1935)
- Hooray for Love (1935)
- Village Tale (1935)
- The Arizonian (1935)
- Jalna (1935)
- Alice Adams (1935)
- Hot Tip (1935)
- The Return of Peter Grimm (1935)
- Freckles (1935)
- His Family Tree (1935)
- The Three Musketeers (1935)
- Hi, Gaucho! (1935)
- The Rainmakers (1935)
- To Beat the Band (1935)
- Mary of Scotland (1936)
- A Woman Rebels (1936)
- The Plough and the Stars (1936)
- Quality Street (1937)
- The Soldier and the Lady (1937)
- The Woman I Love (1937)
- Nothing Sacred (1937) (credited with Travis Banton)
- The Adventures of Tom Sawyer (1938)
- Stagecoach (1939)
- The Story of Vernon and Irene Castle (1939)
- Allegheny Uprising (1939)
- Gone With the Wind (1939)
- The Hunchback of Notre Dame (1939)
- Abe Lincoln in Illinois (1940)
- Vigil in the Night (1940)
- Captain Caution (1940)
- Ladies in Retirement (1941)
- Lydia (1941)
- Sundown (1941)
- Go West, Young Lady (1941)
- Lady for a Night (1942)
- A Gentleman After Dark (1942) (for Miriam Hopkins)
- Forever and a Day (1943)
- The Heat's On (1943)
- In Old Oklahoma (1943)
- Knickerbocker Holiday (1944)
- Can't Help Singing (1944)
- A Song to Remember (1945)
- Along Came Jones (1945)
- Duel in the Sun (1946)
- My Brother Talks to Horses (1947)
- The Sea of Grass (1947)
- Song of Love (1947)
- Green Dolphin Street (1947)
- Summer Holiday (1948)
- The Three Musketeers (1948)
- The Kissing Bandit (1948)
- Little Women (1949)
- The Secret Garden (1949)
- Madame Bovary (1949)
- That Forsyte Woman (1949)
- Adam's Rib (1949) (for Katharine Hepburn)
- Ambush (1950)
- The Outriders (1950)
- Black Hand (1950)
- Stars in My Crown (1950)
- Annie Get Your Gun (1950)
- Father of the Bride (1950)
- The Happy Years (1950)
- The Miniver Story (1950) (for Greer Garson)
- The Toast of New Orleans (1950)
- Summer Stock (1950)
- Devil's Doorway (1950)
- King Solomon's Mines (1950)
- Two Weeks with Love (1950)
- The Magnificent Yankee (1950)
- Payment on Demand (1951)
- Vengeance Valley (1951)
- Mr. Imperium (1951)
- Soldiers Three (1951)
- Kind Lady (1951)
- Show Boat (1951)
- The Law and the Lady (1951)
- An American in Paris (1951) (for Beaux Arts Ball sequence)
- Across the Wide Missouri (1951)
- The Man with a Cloak (1951)
- Westward the Women (1951)
- Singin' in the Rain (1952)
- Carbine Williams (1952)
- The Prisoner of Zenda (1952)
- Plymouth Adventure (1952)
- Million Dollar Mermaid (1952)
- Scandal at Scourie (1953)
- Young Bess (1953)
- Ride, Vaquero! (1953)
- The Actress (1953)
- Kiss Me Kate (1953)
- All the Brothers Were Valiant (1953)
- The Student Prince (1954)
- Valley of the Kings (1954)
- Seven Brides for Seven Brothers (1954)
- Athena (1954)
- Deep in My Heart (1954)
- Many Rivers to Cross (1955)
- Jupiter's Darling (1955)
- The Glass Slipper (1955)
- Moonfleet (1955)
- The Scarlet Coat (1955)
- The King's Thief (1955)
- Diane (1956)
- Forbidden Planet (1956)
- Tribute to a Bad Man (1956) (for Irene Papas)
- Lust for Life (1956)
- The Wings of Eagles (1957)
- Gun Glory (1957)
- Raintree County (1957)
- The Brothers Karamazov (1958)
- Merry Andrew (1958)
- The Sheepman (1958)
- The Law and Jake Wade (1958)
- Some Came Running (1958)
- Home from the Hill (1960)
- Pollyanna (1960)
- Bells Are Ringing (1960)
- Cimarron (1960)
- Pocketful of Miracles (1961)
- The Four Horsemen of the Apocalypse (1962)
- Two Weeks in Another Town (1962)
- How the West Was Won (1962)
- Marriage on the Rocks (1965)
- 7 Women (1966)

== Gallery ==
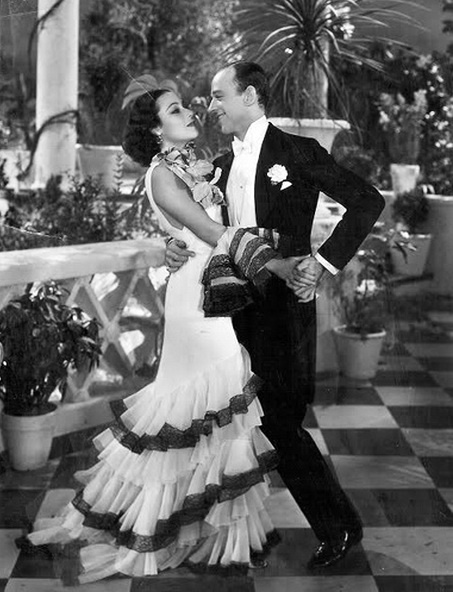
Flying Down to Rio (1933), designs for Dolores del Río and
Fred Astaire

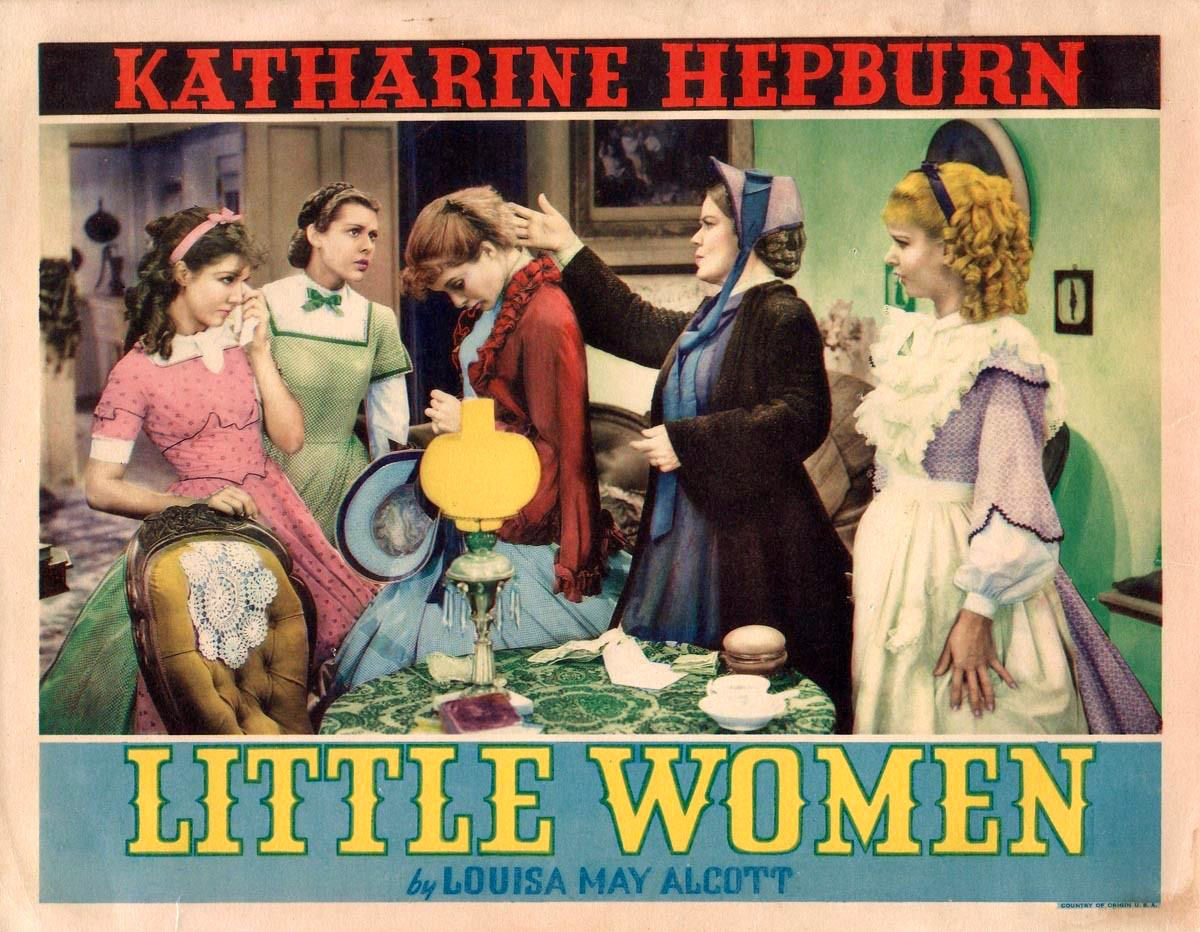
Little Women (1933), designs for Katharine Hepburn and others

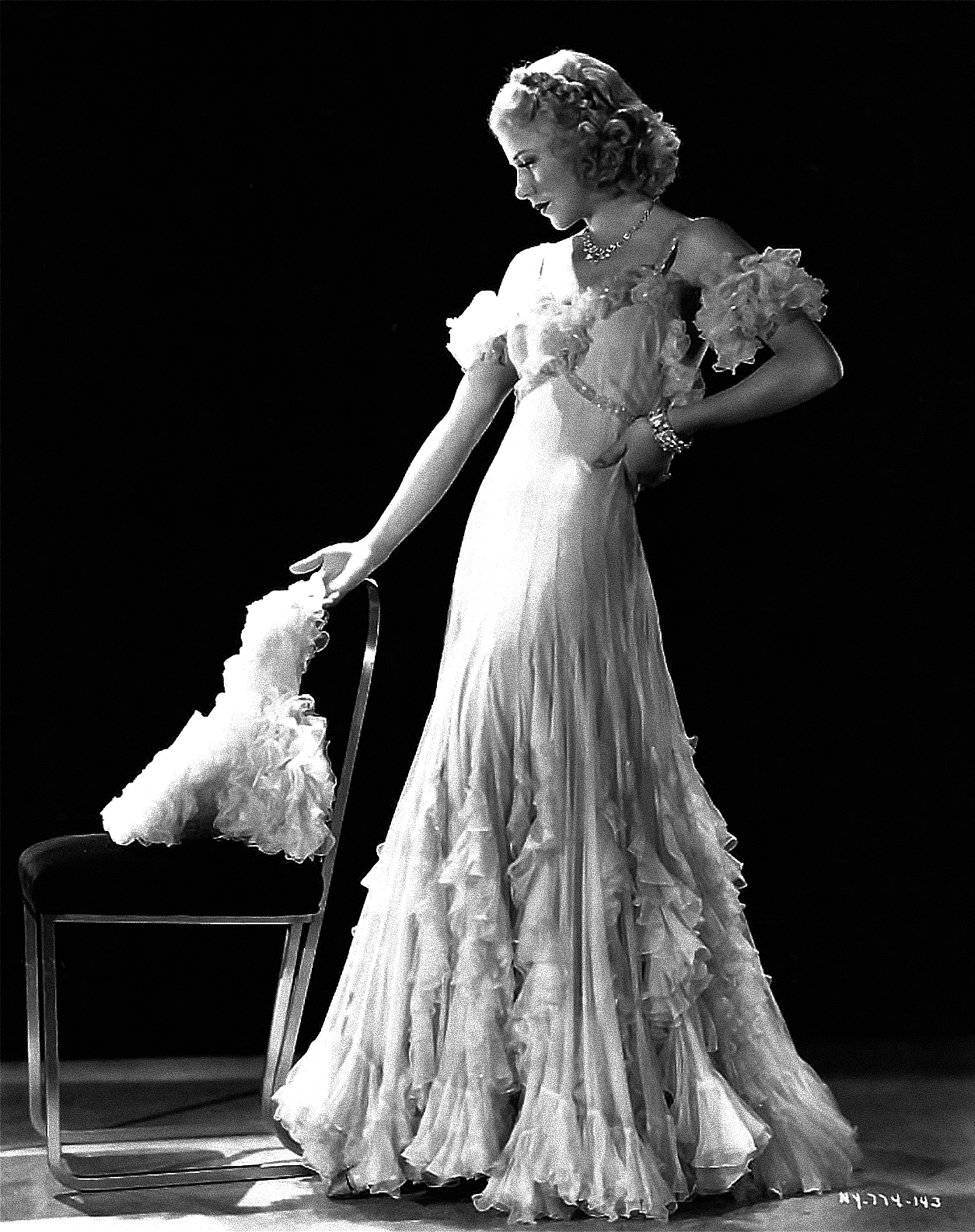
The Gay Divorcee (1934), designs for Ginger Rogers

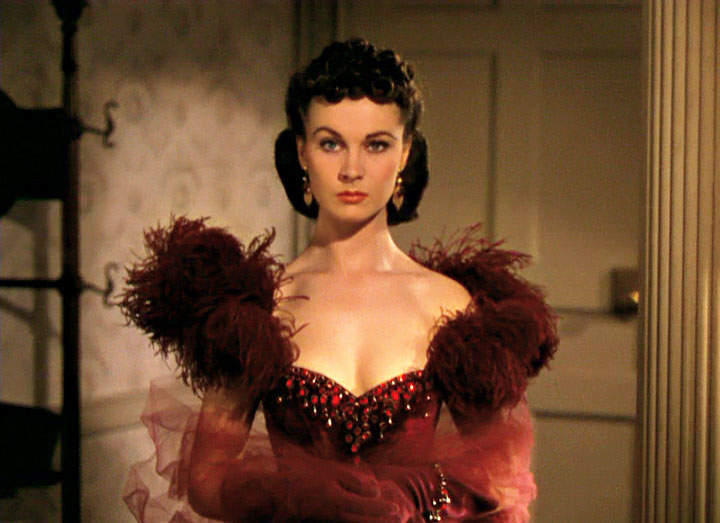
Gone with the Wind (1939), design for Vivien Leigh

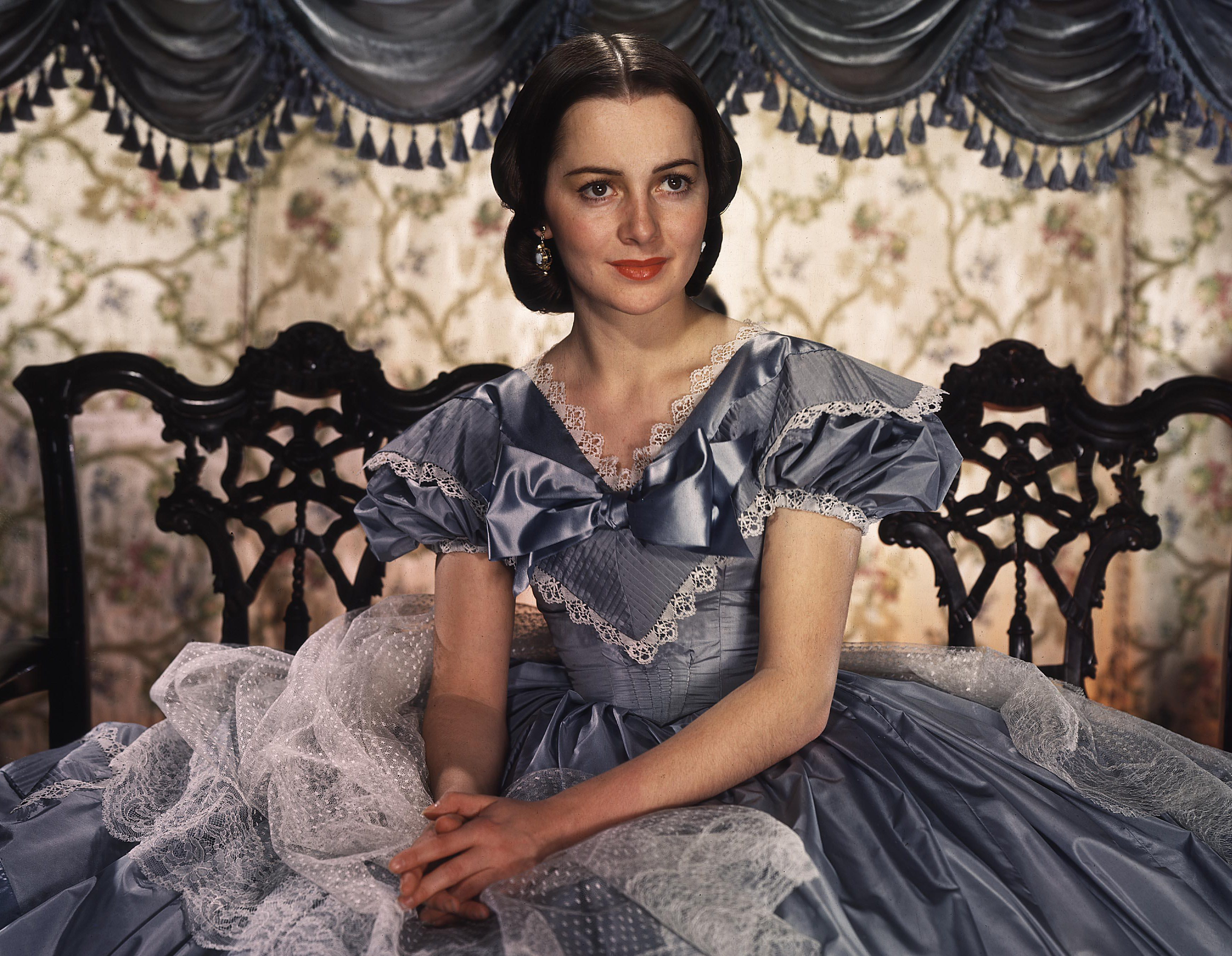
Gone with the Wind (1939), design for Olivia de Havilland

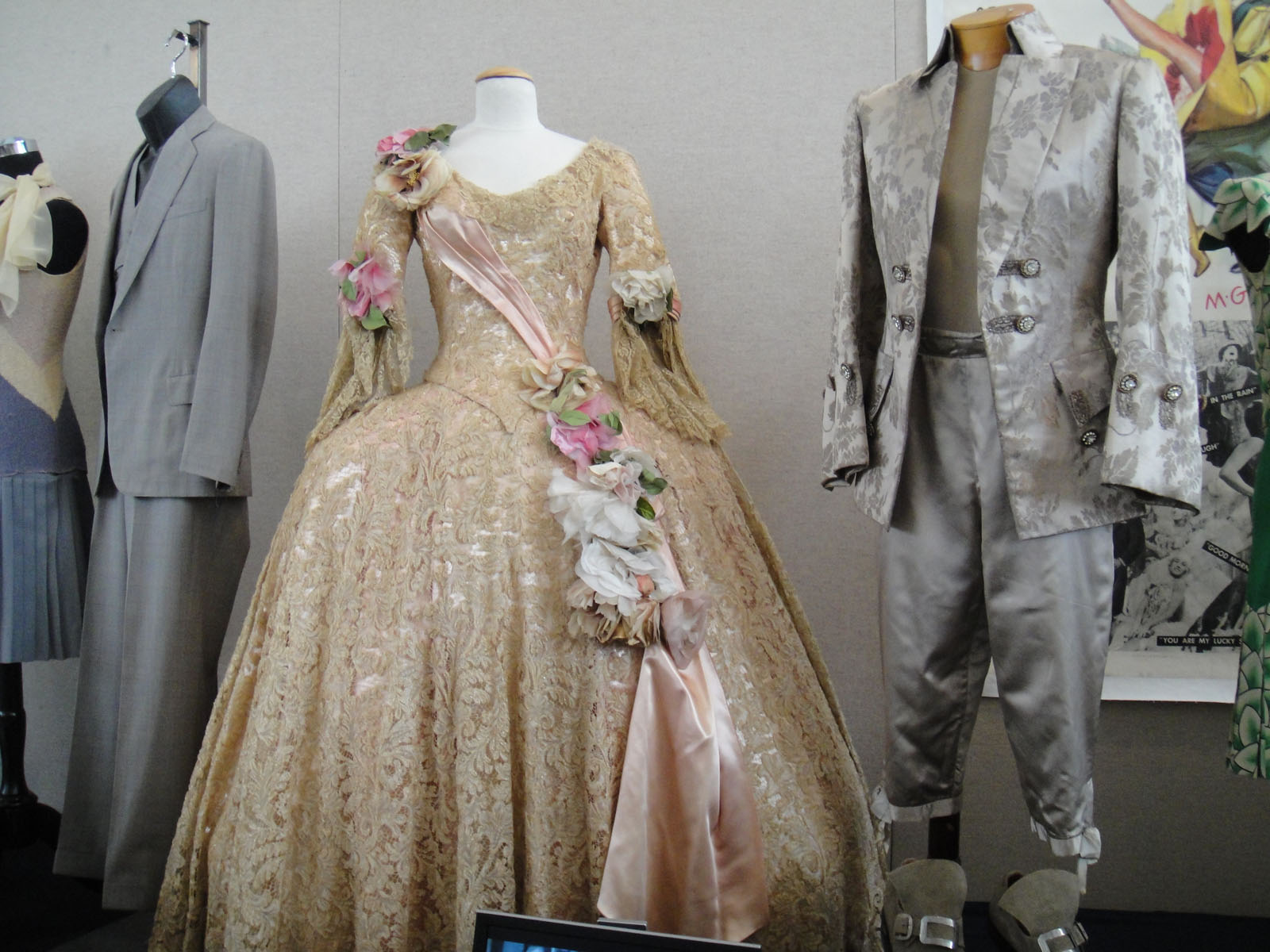
Singin' in the Rain (1952), designs for Jean Hagen and Gene Kelly

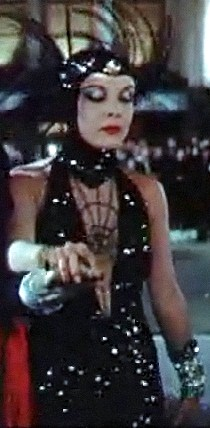
Singin' in the Rain (1952), a satiric "spider web" dress for Judy Landon as fictitious vamp Olga Mara

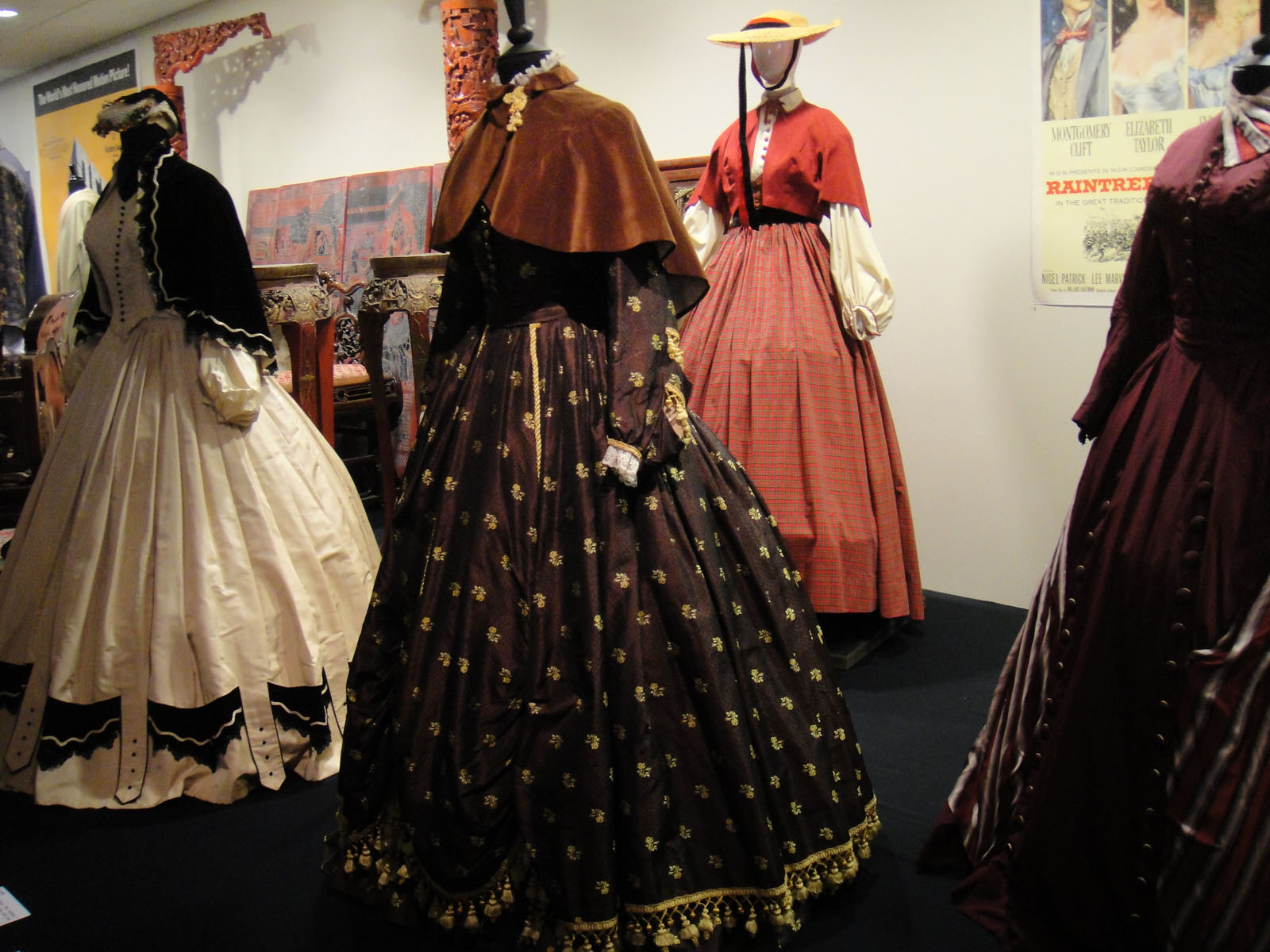
Raintree County (1957), designs for Elizabeth Taylor

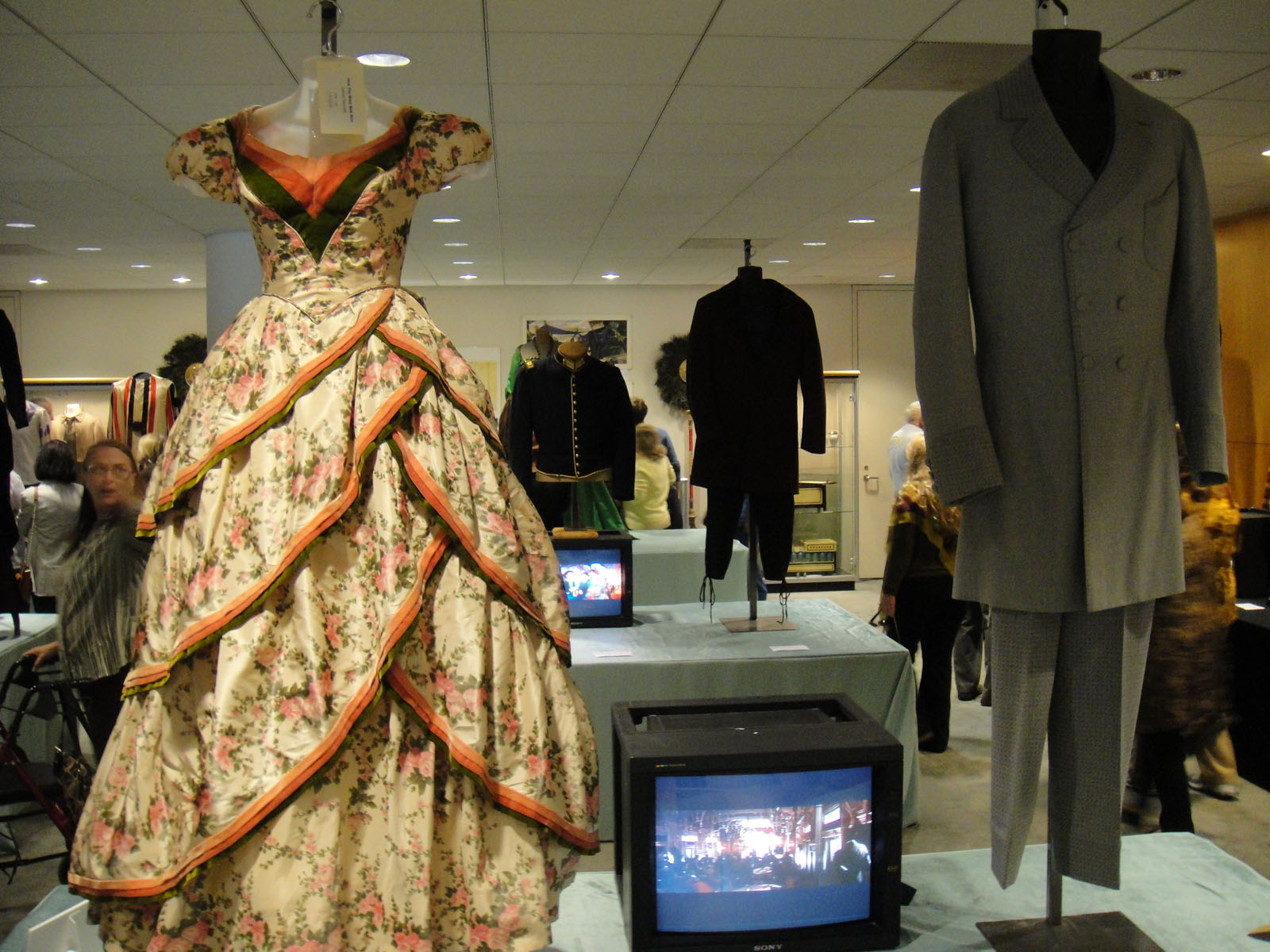
How the West Was Won (1962), designs for Debbie Reynolds and Gregory Peck
