= Mathilde Baring =

American actress

- Born: Mathilde Hoffeldt; September 18, 1879; New Orleans, Louisiana, USA
- Died: December 6, 1954; New York, New York, USA
- Education: Tulane University
- Occupation: Actress
- Children: Isabel Lamon

Mathilde Baring (born Mathilde Hoffeldt) was an American actress active during Hollywood's silent era. Her daughter was the actress Isabel Lamon.

== Biography ==
Mathilde was born in New Orleans to Henry Hoffeldt and Mathilde Gessler. She attended Tulane University before embarking on a career as an actress on the stage and then the screen under the name Mathilde Baring. In addition to her filmography, she also appeared in many plays on Broadway. She was married to Lauren Lamon; the pair had a daughter, Isabel.

== Filmography ==
Year	Title	Director	Role
1912	Robin Hood (1912 film)	Herbert Blaché	
1914	Dolly of the Dailies	Walter Edwin	
1914	Dick Potter's Wife	Ashley Miller	
1915	Olive's Greatest Opportunity	Richard Ridgely	
1916	As a Woman Sows	William F. Haddock	
1916	A Tangle in Hearts	Richard Garrick	
1918	The Panther Woman	Ralph Ince	Mrs. Peale
1918	Love's Law	Tefft Johnson	
