= Vivia Ogden =

American actress (1869–1952)

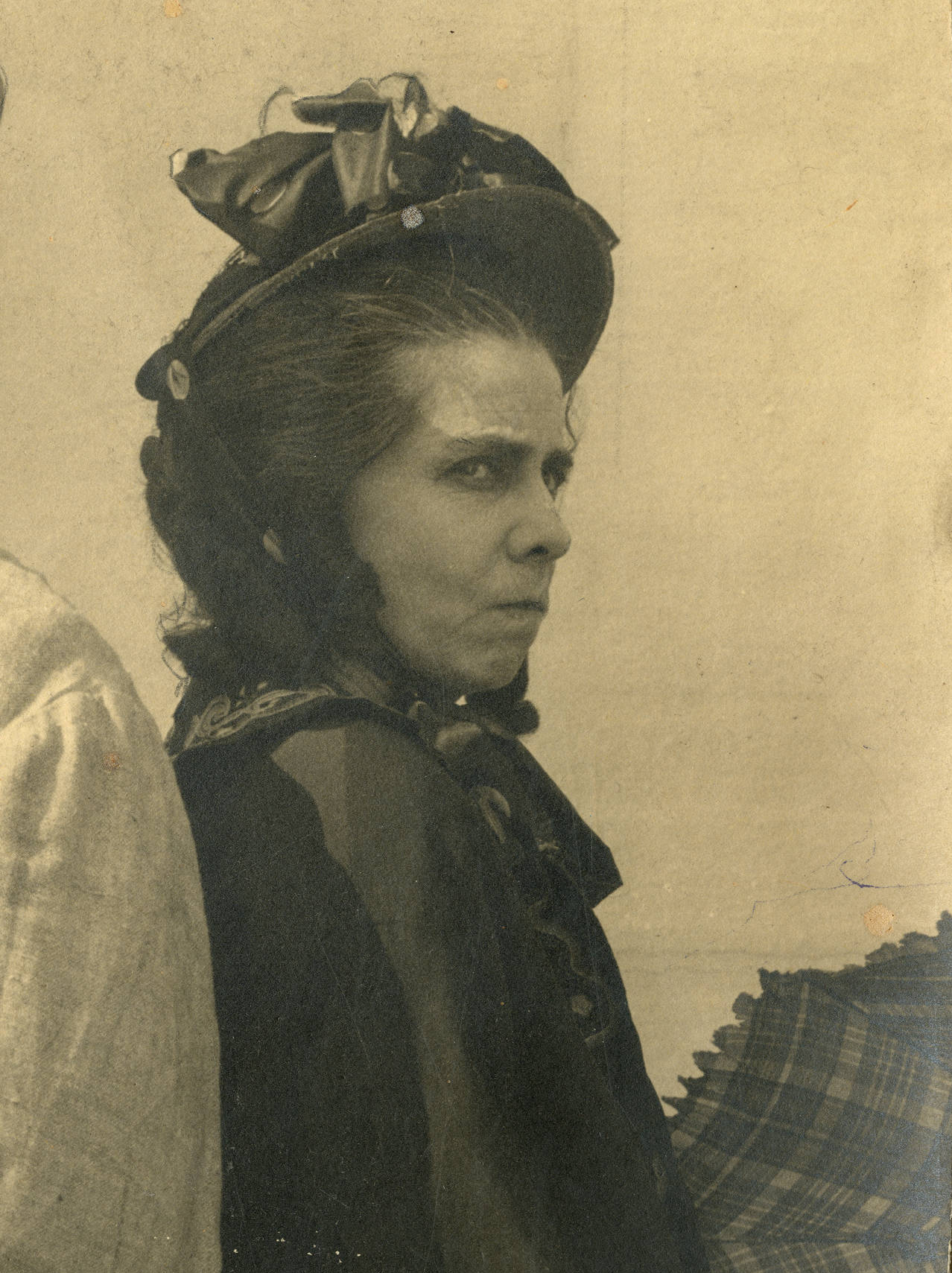
- Born: March 21, 1869; Cleveland, Ohio, U.S.
- Died: December 22, 1952 (aged 83); Los Angeles, California, U.S.
- Occupation: Actress
- Years active: 1915-1926

Vivia Ogden (March 21, 1869 – December 22, 1952) was an American film and stage actress and producer whose career spanned the 1910s and 1920s.

== Early life ==
Ogden was born in 1869 in Cleveland, Ohio.

== Career ==
Oden's film career started in 1915, appearing in films such as The Fairy and the Waif, The Social Secretary, The Corner Grocer, Mrs. Wiggs of the Cabbage Patch, Way Down East, The Chicken in the Case, Stardust, At the Stage Door and John Smith among others.

She also appeared on stage in Clara Morris's company in the 1886 play Miss Multon, with both actresses playing the roles of Paul and Jane, respectively.

== Death ==
Ogden died on December 22, 1952, in Los Angeles, California.

== Filmography ==
- The Fairy and the Waif (1915)
- The Social Secretary (1916) - Spinster (uncredited)
- The Corner Grocer (1917) - Old Maid
- Mrs. Wiggs of the Cabbage Patch (1919) - Miss Tabitha Hazy
- Way Down East (1920) - Martha Perkins
- The Chicken in the Case (1921) - Aunt Sarah
- Stardust (1921) - Mrs. Penny
- At the Stage Door (1921) - Mrs. Reade (as Viva Ogden)
- John Smith (1922) - Cook (as Viva Ogden)
- Timothy's Quest (1922) - Hitty Tarbox
- Idle Tongues (1924) - Althea Bemis
- The Denial (1925) - Effie
- A Slave of Fashion (1925) - Aunt Sophie
- Thank You (1925) - Miss Blodgett
- The Unguarded Hour (1925) - Annie, the Maid
- Lovey Mary (1926) - Miss Hazey
- The Fire Brigade (1926) - Bridget

== Stage ==
- Miss Multon (1886)
