= The Chicken in the Case =

1921 film

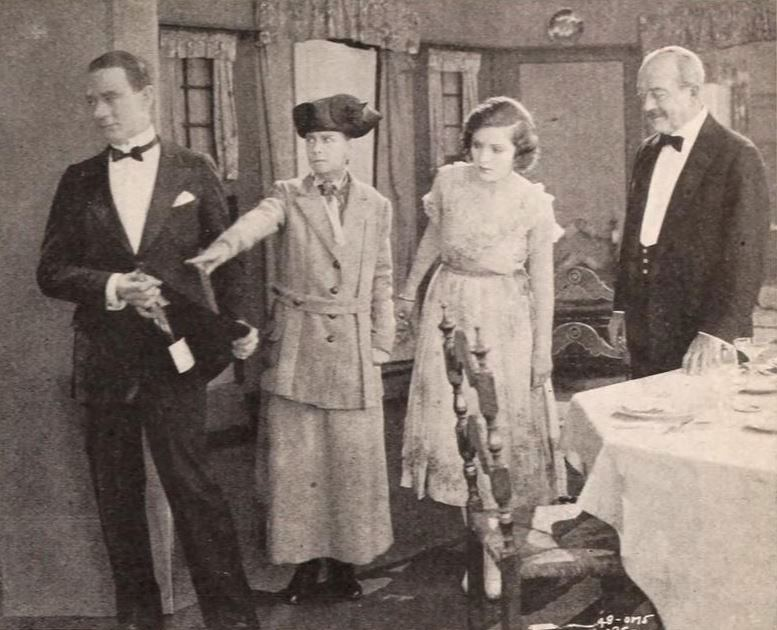
- Directed by: Victor Heerman
- Written by: Sarah Y. Mason; Victor Heerman
- Produced by: Lewis J. Selznick
- Starring: Owen Moore; Vivia Ogden; Teddy Sampson
- Production company: Selznick Pictures
- Distributed by: Selznick Pictures
- Release date: January 1921
- Running time: 50 minutes
- Country: United States
- Language: Silent (English intertitles)

The Chicken in the Case is a 1921 American silent comedy film directed by Victor Heerman and starring Owen Moore, Vivia Ogden and Teddy Sampson.

== Plot ==
As described in a film magazine review, Steve Perkins decides to borrow Winnie, the newly acquired wife of his roommate Percival, in order to meet his Aunt Sarah's wishes and receive his inheritance sooner. The aunt is so impressed with Winifred that she leaves the money in the name of the framed-up wife. Aunty, however, runs into Winifred and her real husband Percy together and becomes suspicious. She then stumbles upon suspicious circumstantial evidence and, after various humorous complications during which Steve marries someone else, the scheme unravels, Steve confesses to the hoax, and it all comes out right.

== Cast ==
- Owen Moore as Steve Perkins
- Vivia Ogden as Aunt Sarah
- Teddy Sampson as Winnie Jones
- Edgar Nelson as Percival Jones
- Katherine Perry as Ruth Whitman
- Linus Aaberg as Maj. Whitman

== Bibliography ==
- Munden, Kenneth White. The American Film Institute Catalog of Motion Pictures Produced in the United States, Part 1. University of California Press, 1997.
