= Isabel Lamon =

American actress (1898–1958)

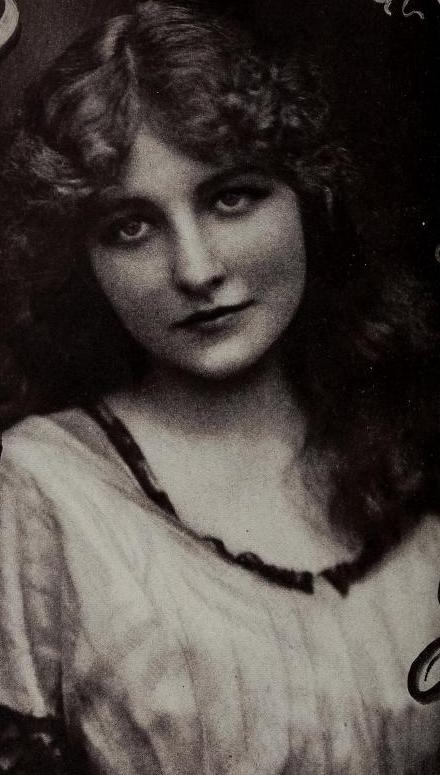
- Isabel Lamon, from a 1913 publication.
- Born: December 1898; Chicago, Illinois, U.S.
- Died: 1958 (aged 59–60)
- Other names: Isabel Baring, Isabelle Lamon, Isabel Hough
- Occupation: actress
- Known for: silent films

Isabel Lamon (December 1898 – 1958), also billed as Isabel Baring, was an American actress in silent films. Among many roles, she played Meg March in the second filmed adaptation of Louisa May Alcott's Little Women.

== Early life ==
Isabel Lamon was born in Chicago, the daughter of Lauren G. Lamon and Mathilde Hoffelt. Her mother was better known as silent film actress Mathilde Baring of Louisiana.

== Career ==
Lamon appeared in more than 30 short silent films between 1911 and 1918, including The Scandal Mongers (1911), Unmerited Shame (1912), It Pays to be Kind (1912), The Legend of Sleepy Hollow (1912), Saved from the Titanic (1912), The Holy City (1912), A Double Misunderstanding (1912), That Loving Man (1912), Wanted a Wife in a Hurry (1912), Robin Hood (1912), Dolls (1912), The Passing Parade (1912), The Lucky Loser (1912), A Choice by Accident (1912), Caprice of Fortune (1912), Making Uncle Jealous (1912), Just Out of College (1913), It Might Have Been (1913), Quarantined (1913), What's In a Name? (1913), Keeping Up Appearances (1913), The Miser (1913), The Higher Duty (1913), The Supreme Sacrifice (1913), Jane's Waterloo (1913), For His Child's Sake (1913), Diamond Cut Diamond (1913), Through Many Trials (1913), Longing for Mother (1913), Violet Dare, Detective (1913), A Father's Love (1913), The Other Woman (1913), Dick's Turning (1913), The Wager (1913), The Strange Way (1913), The Exile (1913), The Matinee Girl (1918), The Face in the Dark (1918), and Little Women (1918). In eight of her films, her mother was also in the cast.

On stage, Lamon appeared in Broadway productions including Sam Houston (1906), when she was a child, Forever After (1918–1919), The Advertising of Kate (1922), Aren't We All? (1924–1925), Love in the Tropics (1927), Gambling (1929), The Tavern (1930), The Song and Dance Man (1930), Just to Remind You (1931), and A Hat, A Coat, A Glove (1934). She was also in The Gingham Girl (1923), The Butter and Egg Man, and The Honeymoon (1926), on the vaudeville stage. She acted in radio drama in the 1930s.

== Personal life ==
Isabel Lamon married songwriter and playwright William M. Hough; they had one child, Carol. Hough had left Lamon by 1932, but there were years of lawsuits before their divorce was final in 1947. Isabel Lamon died in 1958, aged 59 years, in New York. Her grave is with her mother's, in Kensico Cemetery.
