= My Boy (1921 film) =

1921 film by Victor Heerman

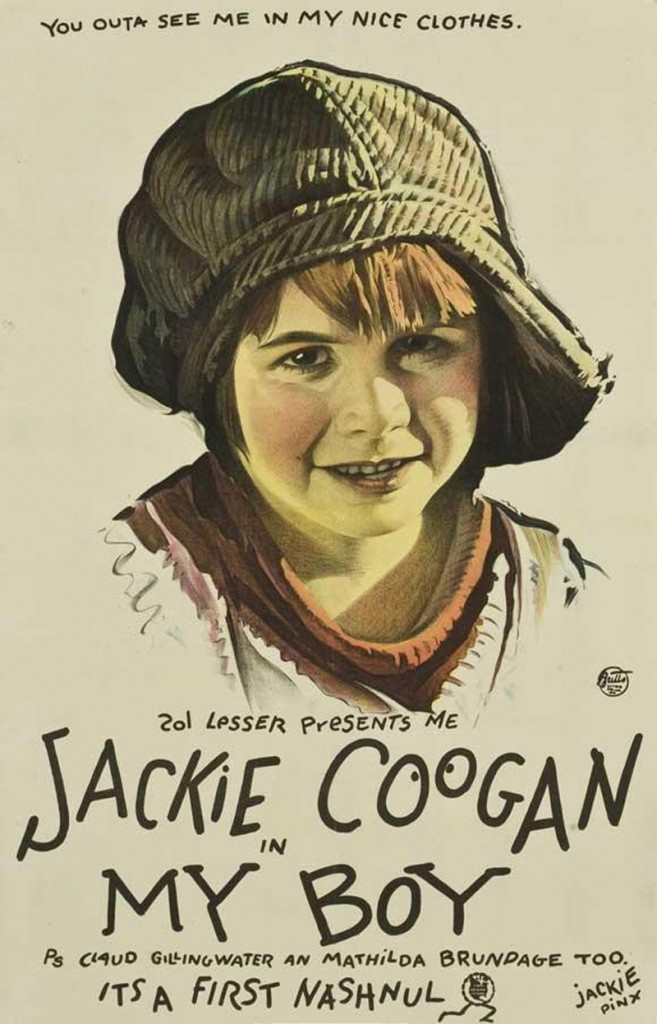
- Theatrical release poster
- Directed by: Victor Heerman; Albert Austin
- Written by: Victor Heerman
- Produced by: Sol Lesser
- Starring: Jackie Coogan
- Cinematography: Glen MacWilliams; Robert Martin
- Production company: Associated First National Pictures
- Release date: December 25, 1921
- Running time: 56 minutes
- Country: United States
- Language: Silent (English intertitles)

My Boy is a 1921 American silent comedy-drama film directed by Victor Heerman and Albert Austin, and starring child actor Jackie Coogan.

== Plot ==
My Boy (1921)

As described in a film magazine, little Jackie Blair arrives in New York City from France without a friend in the world, his mother having died in steerage during the voyage. He slips by the immigration officers at Ellis Island by blending in with a family of eight, and follows an old seaman Captain Bill, who was looking for work along the waterfront, home. Jackie makes himself handy around the house and when morning comes and the Captain decides to take him back to the immigration bureau, Jackie begs to remain. Later, the Captain is taken ill and Jackie goes out and dances with a hand organ grinder to obtain the money needed to buy some medicine. Invited to a party at a settlement house sponsored by wealthy lady, Jackie is accused of stealing the lady's handbag. The handbag is found, however, and the lady turns out to be Jackie's grandmother Mrs. Blair, who had been searching the city for him.

== Cast ==
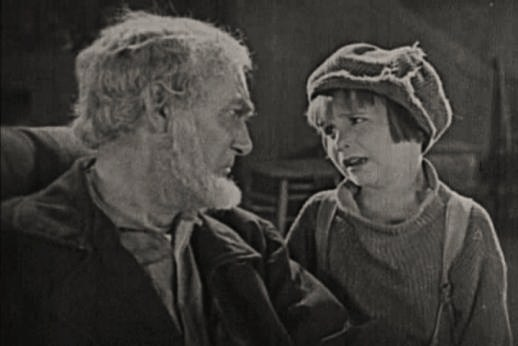
Scene from the film featuring Captain Bill and Jackie

- Jackie Coogan as Jackie Blair
- Claude Gillingwater as Captain Bill
- Mathilde Brundage as Mrs. Blair
- Frank Hayes as Rent collector (uncredited)
- Patsy Marks as Little Girl (uncredited)

== Production ==
In the previous year, Coogan had made a meteoric rise to fame as the star of Charlie Chaplin's The Kid. The film was conceived and written expressly for him, and his father, Jackie Coogan Sr., was given some credit in the press for helping to adapt the script. The film title was reportedly suggested to the production team by Hollywood impresario Sid Grauman.

== Preservation ==
The distribution rights to My Boy were transferred from Warner Bros. to Associated Artists Productions in 1956, and then to United Artists in 1958. A copy of the film is held by Library of Congress and by various film archives. Also a 16mm print is in the Wisconsin Center for Film and Theater Research.

The movie has been preserved and was released in 2004 as part of a Warner Home Video two-disc special edition of Charlie Chaplin's The Kid.
