= Ladies Must Dress =

1927 film

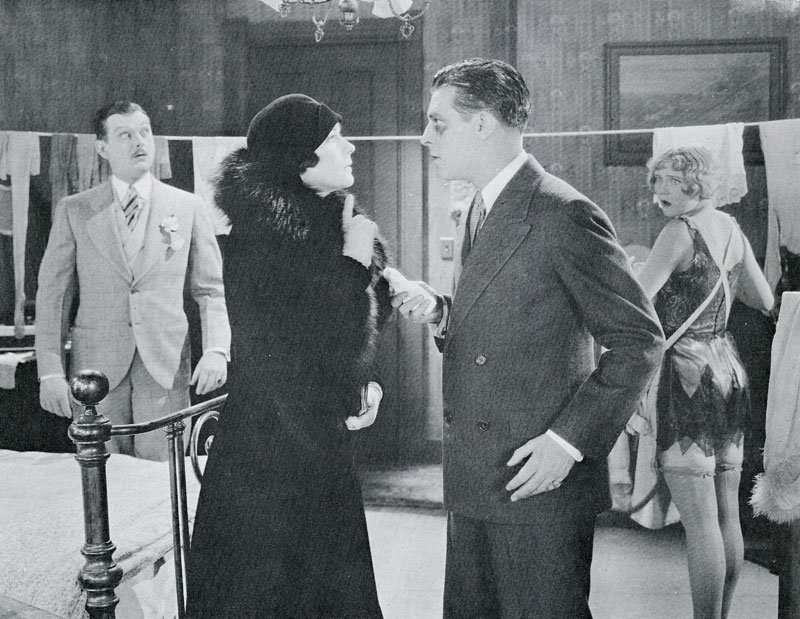
- Directed by: Victor Heerman
- Written by: Malcolm Stuart Boylan; Victor Heerman; Reggie Morris
- Starring: Virginia Valli; Lawrence Gray; Hallam Cooley
- Cinematography: Glen MacWilliams
- Production company: Fox Film
- Distributed by: Fox Film
- Release date: November 20, 1927
- Running time: 60 minutes
- Country: United States
- Languages: Silent; English intertitles

Ladies Must Dress is a 1927 American silent romantic comedy film directed by Victor Heerman and starring Virginia Valli, Lawrence Gray and Hallam Cooley. It marked the screen debut of the future star Nancy Carroll.

== Cast ==
- Virginia Valli as Eve
- Lawrence Gray as Joe
- Hallam Cooley as Art
- Nancy Carroll as Mazie
- Earle Foxe as George Ward, Jr
- Clarence Wilson as Office Manager
- William H. Tooker as Mr. Ward, Sr

== Bibliography ==
- Solomon, Aubrey. The Fox Film Corporation, 1915-1935: A History and Filmography. McFarland, 2011.
