= The Panther Woman =

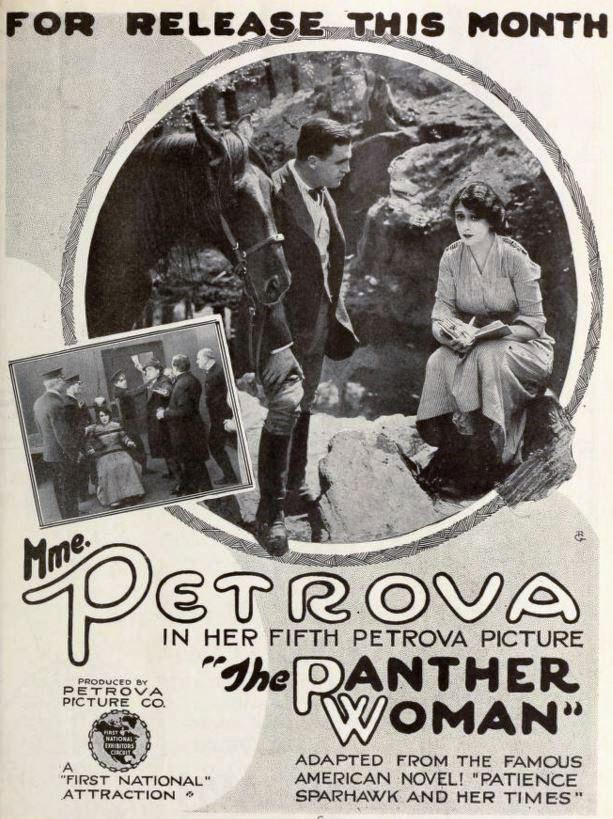
- Advertisement
- Directed by: Ralph Ince
- Written by: Mary Murillo
- Based on: Patience Sparhawk and Her Times by Gertrude Atherton
- Starring: Olga Petrova
- Production company: Petrova Picture Company
- Distributed by: First National Exhibitors' Circuit
- Release date: October 1918
- Running time: 6 reels
- Country: United States
- Language: Silent (English intertitles)

The Panther Woman is a 1918 American silent film drama film directed by Ralph Ince and starring Olga Petrova. It was written by Mary Murillo based upon the 1895 novel Patience Sparhawk and Her Times by Gertrude Atherton and released in October 1918 by First National.

== Plot ==
As described in a film magazine, Patience Sparhawk is an orphan who has been reared by a dissolute stepmother. An inheritance of good character, however, has kept her from being contaminated and when she gets the opportunity to break away and become the ward of Miss Tremont, a wealthy woman, she does so. Out of gratitude she agrees to marry Tremont's nephew, Beverly Peale. Soon after the ceremony she discovers that her husband is a user of drugs and her married life is unhappy. It ends abruptly when Beverly is found dead from an overdose of drugs. Patience is accused of murder and put on trial. She is defended by noted criminal lawyer Garon Bourke, who is in love with her and whom Patience loves. Despite Garon's strenuous efforts, his client is convicted and sentenced to die in the electric chair. The evidence of Honora Maris, who was enamored of Beverly, was the deciding factor. The day of the scheduled execution arrives and at the eleventh hour Garon obtains a confession from Miss Maris that she committed perjury on the witness stand. Garon makes a desperate race to the prison with a reprieve and saves Patience just as she was in the electric chair and the executioner was preparing to throw the switch.

== Cast ==
- Olga Petrova as Patience Sparhawk
- Rockliffe Fellowes as Garon Bourke
- Vernon Steele as Beverly Peale
- Mathilde Baring as Mrs. Peale
- Gene Burnell as Hal
- Frederick Truesdell as Beverly's Father
- Tefft Johnson as Governor of New York
- Violet Reed as Honora Maris
- James A. Furey as 'Old Foord' (credited as James Furey)
- Norma Seifert as Mrs. Sparhawk
- Harry Lambart as Latimer Burr (credited as Harry Lambert)
- Edwin J. Grant (Undetermined Role)

== Reception ==
Like many American films of the time, The Panther Woman was subject to cuts by city and state film censorship boards. For example, the Chicago Board of Censors required a cut, in Reel 6, of the testing of the electric chair.

== Preservation ==
With no prints of The Panther Woman located in any film archives, it is considered a lost film.
