= Little Women (1933 film) =

1933 film by George Cukor

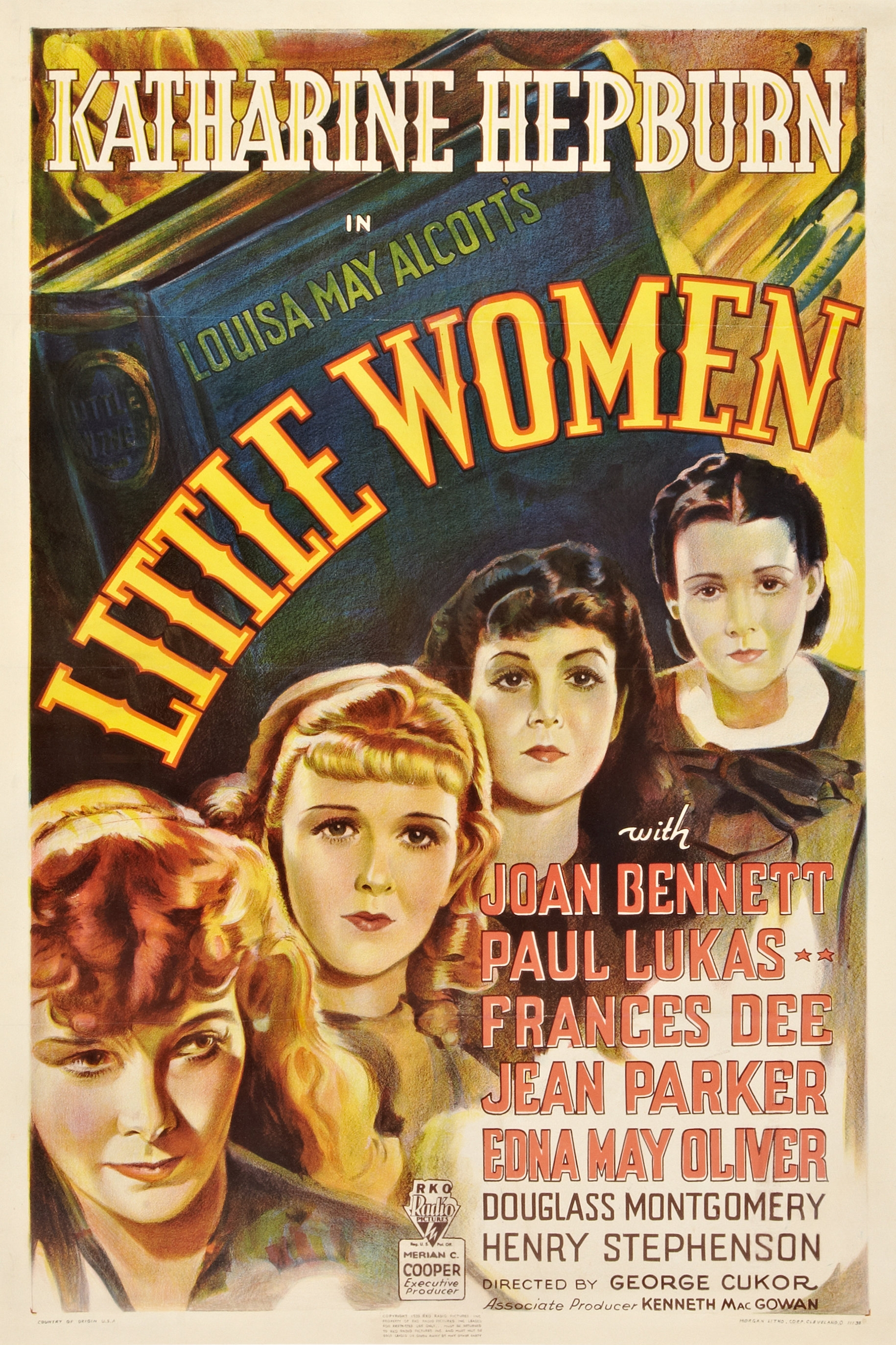
- Theatrical release poster
- Directed by: George Cukor
- Written by: David Hempstead
- Screenplay by: Victor Heerman; Sarah Y. Mason
- Based on: Little Women; 1868 novel by Louisa May Alcott
- Produced by: Merian C. Cooper
- Starring: Katharine Hepburn; Joan Bennett; Paul Lukas; Frances Dee; Jean Parker; Edna May Oliver; Douglass Montgomery; Henry Stephenson
- Cinematography: Henry W. Gerrard
- Edited by: Jack Kitchin
- Music by: Max Steiner
- Production company: RKO Radio Pictures
- Distributed by: RKO Radio Pictures
- Release date: November 16, 1933 (United States)
- Running time: 115 minutes
- Country: United States
- Language: English
- Budget: $424,000
- Box office: $2,070,000 (worldwide rentals)

Little Women is a 1933 American pre-Code drama film directed by George Cukor and produced by Merian C. Cooper and Kenneth MacGowan. It stars Katharine Hepburn, Joan Bennett, Frances Dee, and Jean Parker. The screenplay, written by Sarah Y. Mason and Victor Heerman, is based on the 1868–1869 two-volume novel of the same name by Louisa May Alcott. The film, which broke box office records, is considered one of RKO's most-liked with audiences in 1933. It has received generally positive reviews from film critics, both in the 1930s and more recently.

Sets were designed to closely resemble Alcott's house, and costumes were styled to represent the March family's poverty. The film, which was nominated for and won multiple awards, is the third screen adaptation of the book and the first adaptation with sound. It follows two silent versions made in 1917 and 1918. It has also inspired multiple adaptations and commercial products, being compared favorably to other film adaptations of the novel. It received an Academy Award for Best Adaptation and was nominated for additional Academy Awards.

== Plot ==
Set in Concord, Massachusetts, during and after the American Civil War, the film is a series of vignettes focusing on the struggles and adventures of the four March sisters and their mother, Marmee, while they await the return of their father, a colonel and chaplain in the Union Army. Spirited tomboy Jo dreams of becoming a famous author, and she writes plays for the family to perform for the local children. She also spends several hours every week reading to her Aunt March, though she dislikes it. Amy is pretty but selfish, Meg works as a governess, and sensitive Beth practices on her clavichord.

The girls meet Laurie, who has come to live with his grandfather - Mr. Laurence, their wealthy next-door neighbor. Laurie invites the girls to a lavish party where Meg meets and becomes interested in John Brooke, who is Laurie's tutor. While Beth and Amy sit on the stairs and watch the party, they meet Mr. Laurence. He is impressed by Beth's love for music and offers to let her use his piano. During the next several months, John courts Meg, Beth regularly plays Mr. Laurence's piano, and Jo's first short story is published. Meanwhile, Laurie falls in love with Jo, who sees them as no more than best friends.

Marmee travels to Washington, D.C. after learning her husband is recuperating from an injury in a hospital there. During her absence, Beth contracts scarlet fever from a neighbor's baby and nearly dies. Worried about Beth, the March parents return. Beth recovers but remains in a weakened condition. Later, Meg marries John, which upsets Jo because she wants things to stay the way they are.

After the newly married couple leaves, Laurie confesses his love to Jo, who rejects him. Wanting time to consider her relationship with Laurie, Jo moves to New York City to pursue her writing career. While there, she lives in a boarding house where she meets Professor Bhaer, an impoverished German linguist. With his help and encouragement, Jo improves her writing and resolves her confused feelings about Laurie, who has been living in Europe.

Beth, still suffering from the effects of scarlet fever, is near death. Jo learns of this after an evening with Bhaer and promptly returns to Concord to be with her family. After Beth dies, a grieving Jo learns that Amy, who accompanied Aunt March to Europe, fell in love with Laurie and accepted his proposal. Laurie and Amy return as a married couple and Jo is happy for them. While the family celebrates, Professor Bhaer arrives from New York City and brings Jo's manuscript for Little Women, which is soon to be published. He confesses his love to Jo and proposes. Jo accepts, welcoming him to the family.

== Cast ==
- Katharine Hepburn as Josephine "Jo" March
- Joan Bennett as Amy March
- Frances Dee as Margaret "Meg" March
- Jean Parker as Elizabeth "Beth" March
- Spring Byington as Marmee March
- Douglass Montgomery as Theodore "Laurie" Laurence
- Paul Lukas as Professor Bhaer
- Edna May Oliver as Aunt March
- Henry Stephenson as Mr. Laurence
- John Davis Lodge as Brooke
- Samuel S. Hinds as Mr. March
- Nydia Westman as Mamie
- Harry Beresford as Doctor Bangs
- Mabel Colcord as Hannah
- Marion Ballou as Mrs. Kirke
- Olin Howland as Mr. Davis (uncredited)
- Bonita Granville as Amy's classmate (uncredited)

== Production ==
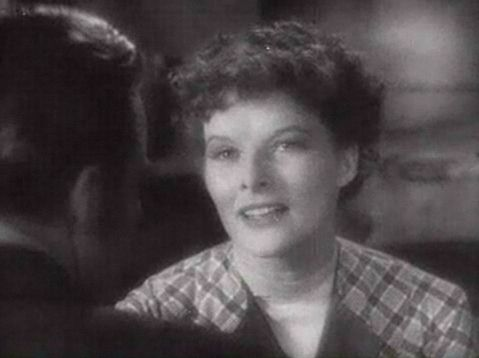
Katharine Hepburn as Jo from the trailer for Little Women (1933)

=== Development ===
David O. Selznick conceived the idea of creating a film based on Louisa May Alcott's Little Women. Selznick left the studio before it could be made and received no screen credit. As a result, Merian C. Cooper took over production. His co-producer was Kenneth MacGowan. John S. Roberton was originally employed as the director, but he was replaced with George Cukor. Cukor had taken a job with MGM, but RKO executives were willing to let him go if he directed this film as his last with the studio.

Selznick and Cukor planned the film as they traveled from Los Angeles to New York City on the ocean. The studio was presented with several unsuccessful scripts until Victor Heerman and Sarah Y. Mason were recruited as screenwriters. Cukor had previously directed a play adaptation of Little Women written by the husband-wife script writing team. RKO files also indicate that Del Andrews helped with the script.

Though the film was largely based on the novel, some aspects were either added or removed. Heerman and Mason added the scene where Marmee volunteers at the United States Christian Commission, which does not appear in the novel. They also removed aspects that emphasize the conflict between Jo and Amy. In the novel Laurie is musical, but in the film his musicality has been transferred to Professor Bhaer.

Selznick planned to modernize the adaptation in order to conserve money but discovered from a survey that the majority of potential viewers wanted it to be authentic to its original setting. Cooper supported the idea of making the film a period piece. Cukor wanted to preserve the episodic nature of the novel, and Cooper established that he wanted the film to be influenced by the book rather than the play. It was likely expected that a plurality of viewers would be women familiar with the novel.

RKO executives were doubtful about whether or not audiences would want to see or enjoy Little Women because it followed the novel so closely. Cukor did not read the novel before filming, feeling it would be "awfully syrupy" and associating it as "a little girl's story". Following production he read at least part of it and liked it, something actress Katharine Hepburn teased him about. Years later Cukor remarked, "I think we did capture just what has made that book live—the real vigour of it, and that love of family."

Cukor, who thought of Joan Bennett as an unemotional actress, impulsively decided on her for the role of Amy March after meeting her at a party while she was slightly inebriated. Cukor noticed that she was "sweet and funny". She became the second billed actress in the cast. After seeing her work in her film debut A Bill of Divorcement, Cukor decided to cast Katharine Hepburn as Jo. Through the course of production Cukor and Hepburn developed a strong friendship that lasted for several years. Eric Linden was cast as Laurie but was replaced by Douglass Montgomery. Louise Closser Hale was originally scheduled to portray Aunt March, but after her death on July 26, 1933, Edna May Oliver assumed the role. Spring Byington, who portrayed Marmee, had previously been a stage actress. Little Women marked her film debut. After the studio contracted a number of cast members, Cooper increased the budget so they could improve the cast.

"When I directed Little Women I had to develop a new technique to ensure the best results from the collaboration of Miss Hepburn and myself...a fine actress, Katharine Hepburn is more than a personality. She is a human dynamo. Without meaning to be, and simply because of the vigor of her own mind and the intensity of her attitude toward her own work, she can be, if given the chance, what I would call an artistic bully...I do not say that had I decided to “lie down” to her from the start, a less good picture would have resulted. But a director with a conscience will fight tooth and nail to get the picture as he wants it. Let me hasten to say that Miss Hepburn and I did not fight at all. I confess freely that I used many weapons in dealing with her -simulated rage, ridicule and good-humored cajolery. She has a great sense of humor, and is capable of directing it against herself. - Director George Cukor, from Behind the Screen, 1938.

At Hepburn's request, costume designer Walter Plunkett designed an opera dress for her character based on one worn by her maternal grandmother. Plunkett needed to redesign several of Joan Bennett's costumes to conceal her advancing pregnancy, a condition that Bennett intentionally had not mentioned to Cukor when he cast her in the film. Cukor requested that the costumes be simple to evoke the fashion styles of the Civil War era.

Plunkett designed the dresses to look shabby, adding frays and fabric patches. He designed the costumes so they could be shuffled among the March sisters in different scenes to emphasize the family bond as well as their poverty. The prime goal of director George Cukor was to emphasize the juxtaposition between sacrifice and family life in Little Women. Costumes, furnishings, and other household items were made accurate by researchers over the period of several months.

Hobe Erwin, a former artist and interior decorator, was hired to oversee the set decoration, and he modeled the interior of the March home after Orchard House, Louisa May Alcott's Massachusetts home. Having an art director allowed Cukor to focus on working with the actors. Outside scenes were filmed at Lancaster's Lake in Sunland, Providencia Ranch in the Hollywood Hills as well as the Warner Bros. Ranch in Pasadena. Fireplaces and candles were hand-colored in original prints of the film.

=== Filming ===
Filming began in July 1933. The film cost $424,000 to make, with 4,000 people working on it during the year-long production. It took longer to make than was initially planned, and went over budget. Cukor had to limit the number of takes for each scene because of the low budget allotted.

During production the sound crew went on strike, which meant the producers and director used a less-experienced crew for parts of the film. Because of their inexperience, Beth's death scene had to be shot several times.

Eventually, Hepburn became so exhausted that she vomited, to which a frustrated Cukor responded, “Well, that’s what I think of the scene, too.” For another scene, Cukor told Hepburn not to "mess up" while carrying food upstairs. When Hepburn stumbled and food spilled on her costume, Cukor slapped her and called her an “amateur”.

Hepburn felt a personal connection with Jo because she had been a tomboy as a child. She felt connections between Marmee and her own mother, as well as her own New England upbringing, and based her acting on what she knew about her grandmother.

Camera methods were used to conceal Bennett's pregnancy, such as adjusting the blocking and filming her above the waist.

=== Score ===
The score, composed by Max Steiner, was written for a 21-piece orchestra; the small size was a result of RKO's lack of confidence in the film's success. Steiner filled the score with music reminiscent of the mid-19th century, including classical pieces and lyrical songs. In his own words, Steiner wanted the score to sound “quaint and old-fashioned”.

The main title theme, reminiscent of a Victorian lullaby, eventually becomes Jo's theme. This was reused in the 1949 remake. Beth's theme is the 19th-century song “Bloom, My Tiny Violet”. When she dies, Steiner creates a sense of the afterlife by combining an orchestra with a vocalizing choir. While Cukor disliked Steiner's score for its sentimentality, Hepburn enjoyed it.

== Release ==
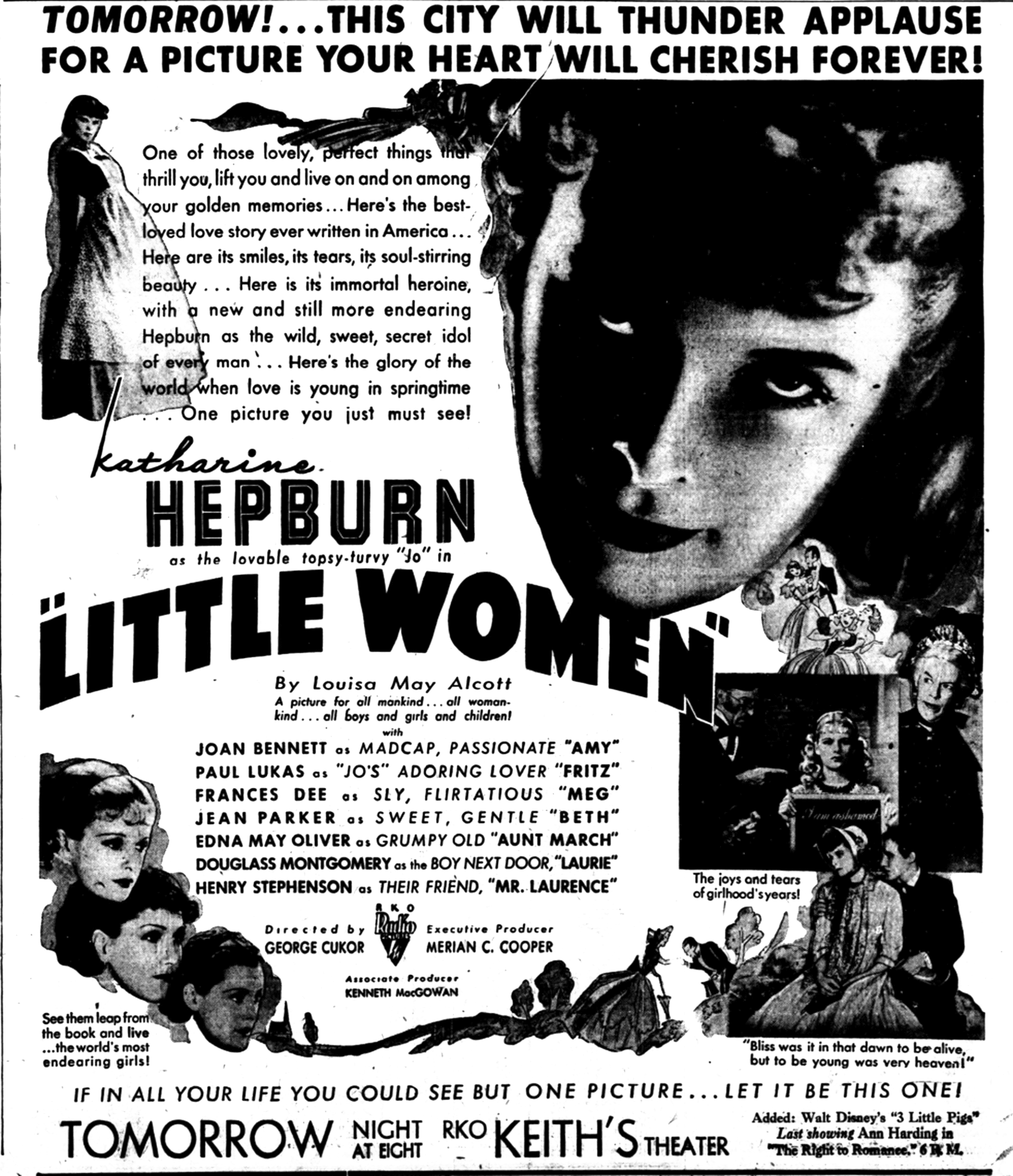
An advertisement from 1933

The film opened on November 16, 1933, at Radio City Music Hall. Despite the fact that it was the coldest November 16 in half a century, the film broke opening-day records with 23,073 attending. By the end of the day, it broke box office records by $500. It was officially released on November 24 and earned more than $100,000 during its first week of release and accumulated a total profit of $800,000. A record 451,801 people attended the three-week run at Radio City Music Hall before the film was moved to RKO's Center Theatre, where an additional 250,000 people attended over the course of four weeks.

"Little Women" was among the most popular films at the American box office in 1933. Over 20,000 attended each day of opening week, and lines were still full when the theater closed. On one occasion, 30 police officers were brought in to ensure crowds of potential viewers did not grow riotous. Theaters in Europe showing the film were also full. It ranked as #4 in the highest-grossing films of 1933.

During its initial release, Little Women earned a total theater rentals of $2,000,000, with $1,397,000 from the U.S. and Canada and $663,000 from other countries. A 1938 re-release earned an additional $70,000 in rentals, resulting in an overall profit of $849,000. Following its release, the film's popularity led to an increase in purchases of the novel. In April 2002, Sound & Vision announced that Warner Home Video released a restored version of Little Women on DVD. The restored version was later released on Blu-ray via the Warner Archive Collection in August 2023.

== Reception ==
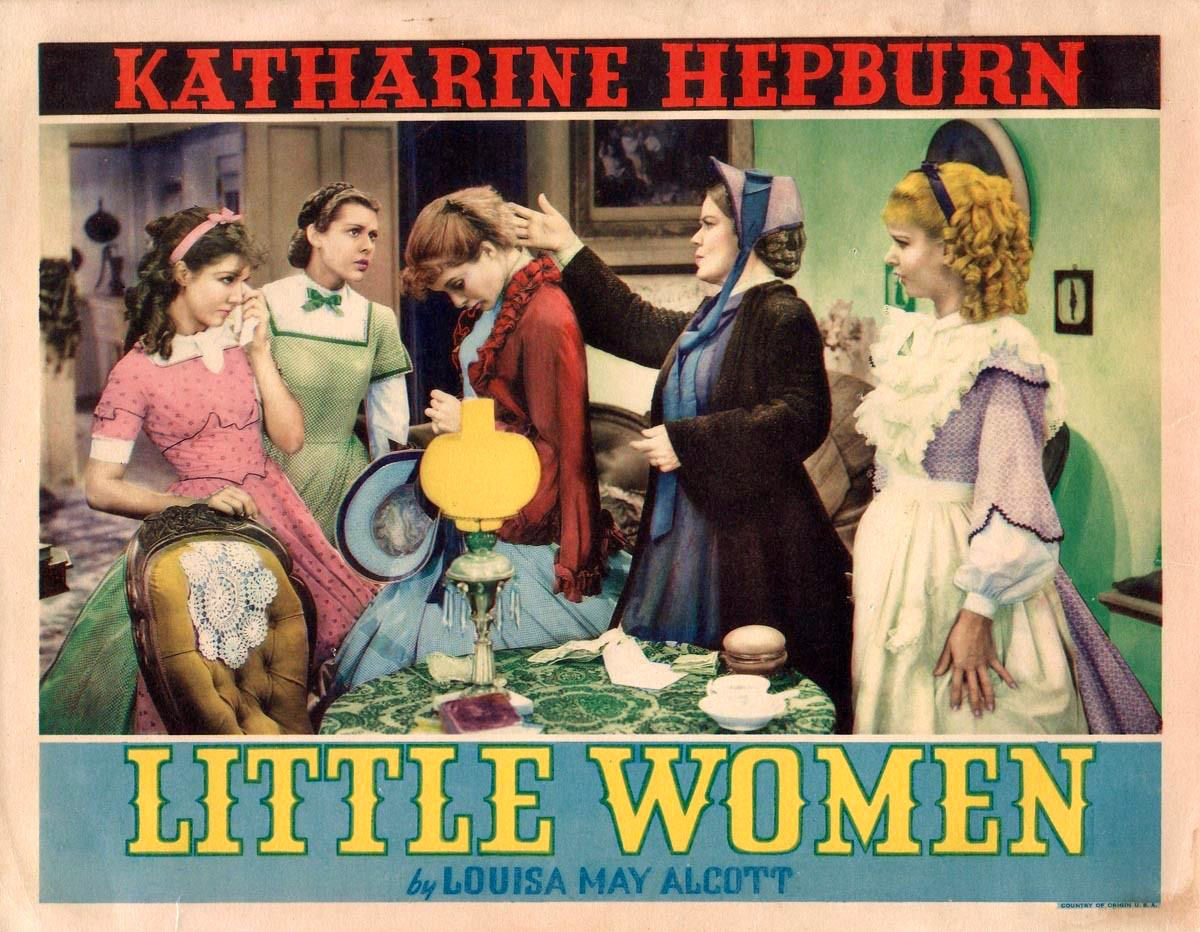
Lobby card

=== Critical reception ===
The film was praised by critics upon its release.Time Magazine predicted that Little Women would “place Katharine Hepburn near the top of the list of U.S. box-office favorites”. Motion Picture Herald expected its attendance to bypass the attendance of films from the last eleven months. The Film Daily predicted that it would “get a rousing reception” and commented that “it seems as though the characters had actually come to life”.

Mordaunt Hall of The New York Times wrote, "The easy-going fashion in which George Cukor, the director, has set forth the beguiling incidents in pictorial form is so welcome after the stereotyped tales with stuffed shirts . . . The film begins in a gentle fashion and slips away smoothly without any forced attempt to help the finish to linger in the minds of the audience." He later rated it as #8 in the top ten best films of 1933.

Variety called it "a superbly human document, sombre in tone, stately and slow in movement, but always eloquent in its interpretations." John Mosher of The New Yorker declared it "an amazing triumph" and "a picture more intense, wrought with more feeling, than any other we are likely to see for a long time to come."

The New York World-Telegram credited the film "a stunningly clever job of recapturing on the screen all the simplicity and charm of its author", writing that Hepburn gave "an unforgettably brilliant performance and that once and for all she definitely proves how unlimited and effortless an actress she really is." The New York American wrote, "at the moment, and for days, weeks, months to come, Miss Hepburn's characterization will stand alone on a pedestal of flaming brilliance." Japanese audiences, which received the film a year after its release in the United States, enjoyed Hepburn's portrayal of Jo, critics praising its themes of love and loyalty.

Little Women has also received more recent critical attention. Tom Milne of TimeOut Film Guide says that even though the film has “a rich vein of sentiment, . . . Hepburn’s Jo, making a subversive choice of what she wants her life to be, . . . ensures that the cosiness isn’t everything.” Film historian Charlie Keil comments that scenes where Hepburn alternates between feminine and masculine traits for Jo shows both her acting skills and Jo's acting skills. Author Anne Boyd Rioux remarks that Hepburn emphasizes Jo's tomboyishness to the point that it suppresses her feminine traits. Leonard Martin’s Classic Movie Guide remarks, “[The] film offers endless pleasure no matter how many times you’ve seen it; a faithful, beautiful adaptation”.

Margaret Roarty of The Film Review writes, "The March sisters—save for Jo—are all interchangeable and never really get a chance to shine on their own" because "the film doesn't dwell on unpleasantness very long". She adds that Jo "simply accepts what's happening without much care." Hollywood historian Steven C. Smith credits it as "RKO's most successful release to date".

TV Guide rated the film four stars, calling it "unabashedly sentimental" and "an example of Hollywood's best filmmaking." It added, "The sets, costumes, lighting, and direction by George Cukor all contribute greatly to this magnificent film, but the performances, especially Hepburn's, are what make the simple story so moving . . . Released during the depths of the Depression, Little Women buoyed Americans' spirits. It still does."

Little Women was voted one of the ten best pictures of 1934 by Film Daily's annual poll of critics. The film was included by the Vatican in a list of important films compiled in 1995, under the category of "Art". Little Women has an approval rating of 89% on review aggregator website Rotten Tomatoes, based on 18 reviews, and an average rating of 8.4/10. Metacritic assigned the film a weighted average score of 92 out of 100, based on 7 critics, indicating "universal acclaim".

=== General reception ===
RKO may have benefited from the fact that Depression-era audiences were especially receptive of the film's evocation of life in a simpler and more innocent world. In addition, as studios had been criticized in 1932 and 1933 for violent and sexual themes, many viewers valued the film's conservative nature. Cukor's adaptation highlights the Marches' financial hardships. Viewers related to the financial struggles and simple way of life, and they connected with the theme of family and domesticity.

=== Accolades ===
The film was nominated at the 6th Academy Awards for Best Picture, Best Director for Cukor and Best Adaptation, winning the latter. Katharine Hepburn was not nominated for Lead Actress for this film, but she was nominated for Morning Glory, for which she eventually won.

Award	Category	Nominee(s)	Result
Academy Awards	Outstanding Production	Merian C. Cooper and Kenneth Macgowan	Nominated
Academy Awards	Best Director	George Cukor	Nominated
Academy Awards	Best Adaptation	Victor Heerman and Sarah Y. Mason	Won
National Board of Review Awards	Top Ten Films		Selected
Photoplay Awards	Gold Medal		Won
Venice International Film Festival	Best Foreign Film	George Cukor	Nominated
Venice International Film Festival	Best Actress	Katharine Hepburn	Won

== Adaptations and legacy ==
With the film's success, Madame Alexander produced and sold Little Women dolls. Around the same time, a United Press correspondent staying in Paris claimed that women's fashion was beginning to hark back to old-fashioned styles because of the film. The film was also incorporated into school programs. In 1947 Hepburn played Jo for a radio dramatization of the story. The other actresses occasionally appeared as their characters in additional radio dramatizations.

When it was remade in 1949 by MGM, Cukor declined working as the director because he felt it would not be as charming as the 1933 version, because Hepburn was not cast as Jo. The script was almost identical to the script of the 1933 version. Once it was released, Cukor felt it lacked “magic”.

López-Rodríguez claims that of the 1933, 1949, and 1994 adaptations, “the Jo March closer to Alcott’s description is Katharine Hepburn”. Other filmmakers wanted to release films that had a similar mood to the 1933 Little Women. Anne of Green Gables (1934) was produced to achieve this effect.

== See also ==
- List of films and television shows about the American Civil War
- Little Women (1917 film)
- Little Women (1918 film)
- Little Women (1949 film)
- Little Women (1994 film)
- Little Women (2018 film)
- Little Women (2019 film)
