= Little Women (1918 film) =

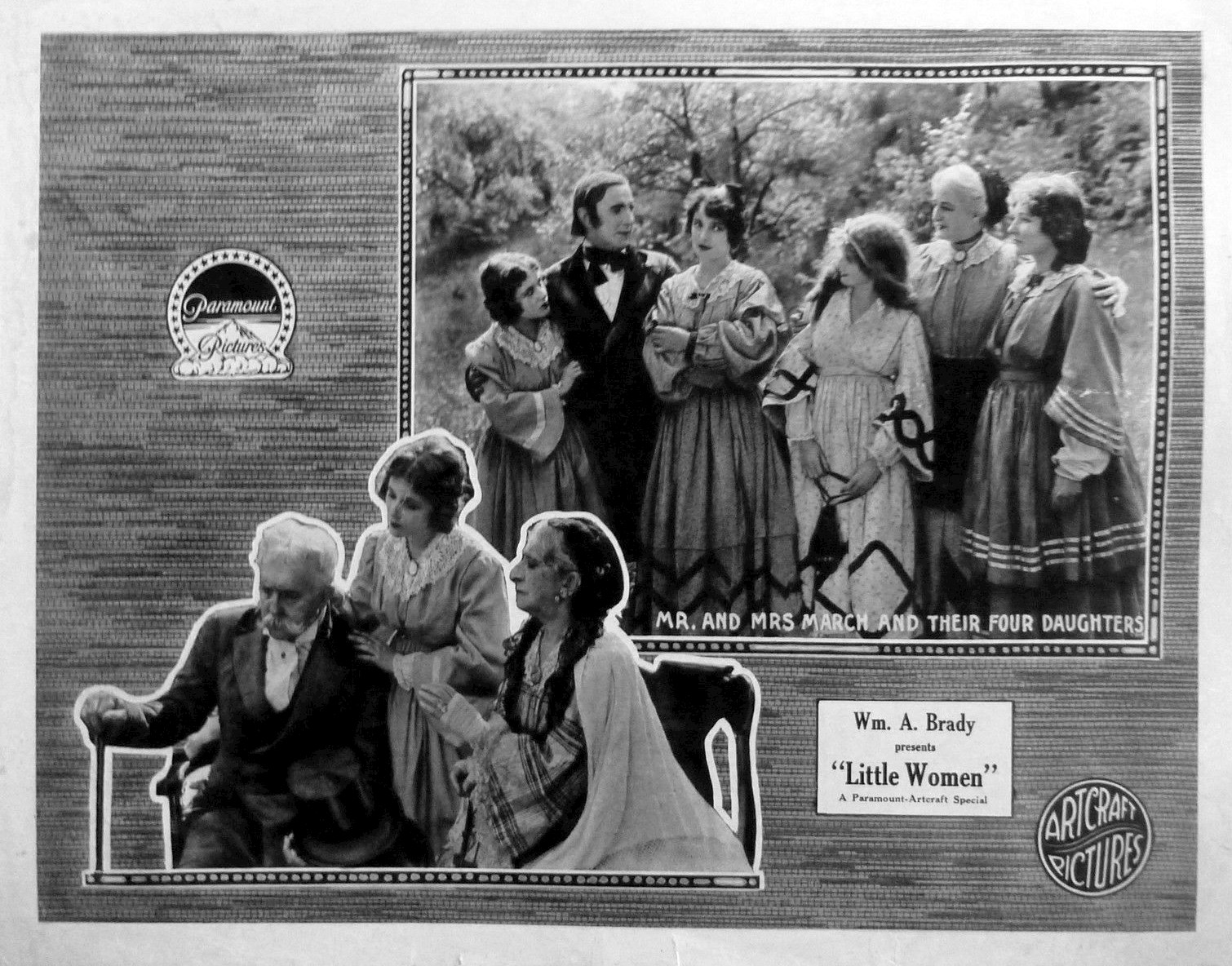
- Lobby card
- Directed by: Harley Knoles
- Screenplay by: Anne Maxwell
- Based on: Little Women; 1868 novel by: Louisa May Alcott
- Produced by: William A. Brady; G. B. Samuelson
- Starring: Isabel Lamon; Dorothy Bernard; Lillian Hall; Florence Flinn; Henry Hull; Conrad Nagel
- Cinematography: René Guissart
- Production company: William A. Brady Picture Plays
- Distributed by: Paramount Pictures
- Release date: November 10, 1918
- Running time: 60 minutes
- Country: United States
- Language: Silent (English intertitles)

Little Women is a lost 1918 American silent drama film directed by Harley Knoles and written by Anne Maxwell based upon the 1868–69 two-volume novel of the same name by Louisa May Alcott. The film stars Isabel Lamon, Dorothy Bernard, Lillian Hall, Florence Flinn, and Conrad Nagel. The film was released on November 10, 1918, by Paramount Pictures.

== Plot ==
Jo March, her parents, and sisters Meg, Beth, and Amy live in Concord, Massachusetts. Mr. March goes to Washington, D.C. to work, and becomes seriously ill. In order to raise money for Mrs. March to travel and be with her husband Jo sells her hair. Mr. and Mrs. March are able to return home. Jo wants to be an author, and begins to write the story of her own family, including Meg falling in love with neighbor Laurie's tutor John Brooke, Beth's illness and death, and Amy's marriage to Jo's best friend Laurie.

== Cast ==
- Isabel Lamon as Meg March
- Dorothy Bernard as Jo March
- Lillian Hall as Beth March
- Florence Flinn as Amy March
- Conrad Nagel as Laurie Lawrence
- Kate Lester as Marmee
- Henry Hull as John Brooke
- George Kelson as Mr. March
- Julia Hurley as Aunt March
- Lynn Hammond as Professor Friedrich Bhaer
- Nellie Anderson as Hannah
- Frank DeVernon as Mr. Lawrence

== Production and filming ==
Producer William A. Brady was able to persuade the Alcott estate to allow Little Women to be adapted for stage and film. Brady first produced a stage play of the novel, which ran at the Playhouse Theatre in New York City for 18 months before touring the country. Director Harley Knoles filmed scenes inside of Louisa May Alcott's house in Concord.

== See also ==
- Little Women (1917 film)
- Little Women (1933 film)
- Little Women (1949 film)
- Little Women (1994 film)
- Little Women (2018 film)
- Little Women (2019 film)
