= Victor Heerman =

American screenwriter and film director

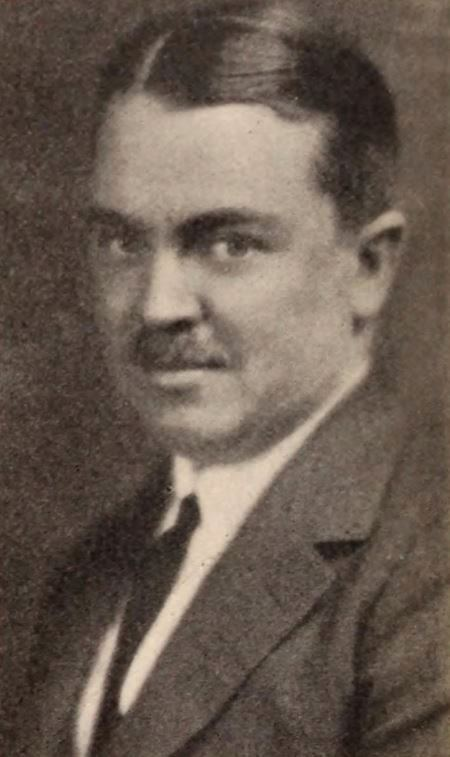
- Heerman in 1920
- Born: Victor Eugene Heerman; August 27, 1893; Surrey, England
- Died: November 3, 1977 (aged 84); Los Angeles, California, U.S.
- Years active: 1916–1949
- Spouse: Sarah Y. Mason (m. 1921)
- Children: 2

Victor Eugene Heerman (August 27, 1893 – November 3, 1977) was an English-American film director, screenwriter, and film producer. After writing and directing short comedies for Mack Sennett, Heerman teamed with his wife Sarah Y. Mason to win the Academy Award for Best Adapted Screenplay of Louisa May Alcott's novel Little Women in 1933. He is probably best-known to film buffs as director of the Marx Brothers' second film, Animal Crackers (1930). He and Mason were the first screenwriters involved in early, never-produced scripts commissioned for what would become MGM's Pride and Prejudice.

== Life and career ==
=== As director ===
- She Loved a Sailor (1916, short)
- Are Waitresses Safe?: 1917, short)
- A Maiden's Trust: (1917, short)
- Pinched in the Finish: 1917, short)
- Stars and Bars: (1917, short)
- Watch Your Neighbor (1918, short)
- His Naughty Wife (1919, short)
- Chicken à la Cabaret (1920, short)
- The River's End (1920)
- Don't Ever Marry (1920)
- The Poor Simp (1920)
- My Boy (1921)
- The Chicken in the Case (1921)
- A Divorce of Convenience (1921)
- John Smith (1922)
- Love Is an Awful Thing (1922)
- Modern Marriage (1923)
- Rupert of Hentzau (1923)
- The Dangerous Maid (1923)
- The Confidence Man (1924)
- Old Home Week (1925)
- Irish Luck (1925)
- For Wives Only (1926)
- Rubber Heels (1927)
- Ladies Must Dress (1927)
- Love Hungry (1928)
- Paramount on Parade: (1930, sequence director)
- Personality (1930)
- Animal Crackers (1930)
- Sea Legs (1930)
- The Stolen Jools: (1931, short)

=== As writer ===
- Magnificent Obsession: 1954 (based upon the screenplay by)
- Little Women: 1949 (screenplay)
- Meet Me in St. Louis: 1944 (uncredited)
- A Girl, a Guy, and a Gob: 1941 (uncredited)
- Pride and Prejudice: 1940 (uncredited)
- Golden Boy: 1939 (screenplay)
- Stella Dallas: 1937 (screenplay)
- Magnificent Obsession: 1935 (screenplay)
- Break of Hearts: 1935 (screenplay)
- The Little Minister: 1934 (screenplay)
- Imitation of Life: 1934 (uncredited)
- The Age of Innocence: 1934 (screenplay)
- Little Women: 1933 (screenplay)
- Personality: 1930
- Love Hungry: 1928 (story)
- Ladies Must Dress: 1927 (story)
- Modern Matrimony: 1923 (story)
- Love Is an Awful Thing: 1922
- John Smith: 1922 (story)
- My Boy: 1921
- A Divorce of Convenience:, 1921 (story)
- The Chicken in the Case: 1921 (story)

== See also ==
- List of Academy Award winners and nominees from Great Britain
