= The Slave Girl (1915 film) =

1915 film

- Directed by: Tod Browning
- Written by: George Hennessy
- Starring: Elmo Lincoln; Teddy Sampson; Miriam Cooper
- Release date: March 20, 1915
- Running time: 2 reels
- Country: United States
- Languages: Silent; English intertitles

The Slave Girl is a 1915 American short silent Western film directed by Tod Browning and starring Elmo Lincoln.

== Cast ==
- Elmo Lincoln as Bob West (billed as Otto Lincoln)
- Teddy Sampson as Daughter
- W. E. Lawrence as Fred Gilbert
- Mary Alden as Sally
- Miriam Cooper
- Jennie Lee
