= Robert Planck =

American cinematographer

Robert H. Planck
- Born: Robert Herbert Planck; August 19, 1902; Huntington, Indiana, U.S.
- Died: October 31, 1971 (aged 69); Camarillo, California, U.S.
- Occupation: Cinematographer
- Spouse: Sylvia Planck

Robert Herbert Planck (August 19, 1902 – October 31, 1971) was an American cinematographer. He was nominated for four Academy Awards in the category Best Cinematography for the films Anchors Aweigh, The Three Musketeers, Little Women and Lili.

Planck died in October 1971 in Camarillo, California, at the age of 69. He was buried in Forest Lawn Memorial Park.

== Selected filmography ==
- Anchors Aweigh (1945; co-nominated with Charles P. Boyle)
- The Three Musketeers (1948)
- Little Women (1949; co-nominated with Charles Schoenbaum)
- Lili (1953)
