= Teddy Sampson =

American actress (1895–1970)

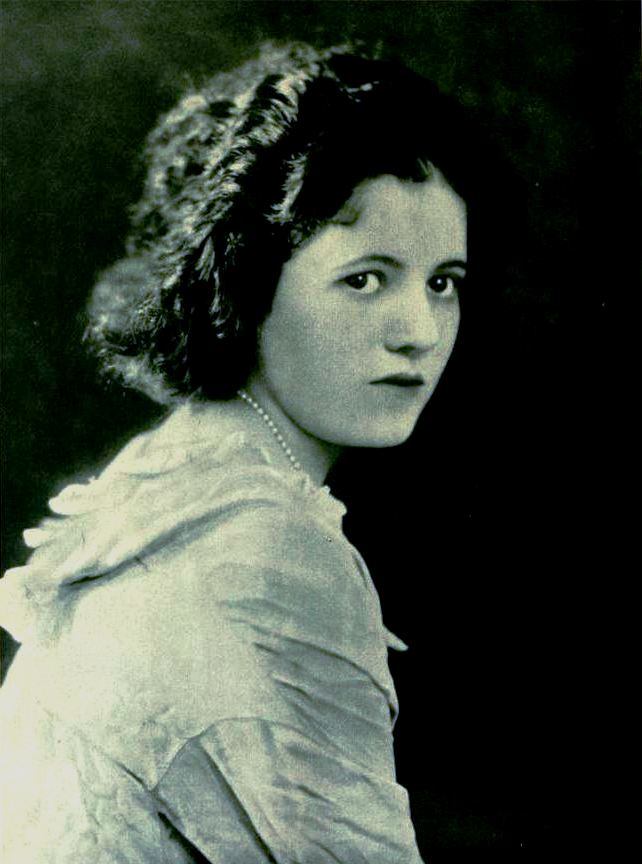
- Sampson in 1922
- Born: Nora Sampson; August 8, 1895; New York City, New York, U.S.
- Died: November 24, 1970 (aged 75); Los Angeles, California, U.S.
- Occupations: Stage and screen actress
- Spouse: Ford Sterling (m. 1914; died 1939)
- Family: Paul Revere (great-great-great-grandfather)

Nora Sampson (August 8, 1895 – November 24, 1970), known professionally as Teddy Sampson, was an American stage and silent film actress who appeared in at least forty-one motion pictures between 1914 and 1923.

== Biography ==
Nora Sampson was born in New York City, the sixth of seven children raised by Revere and Mary Sampson. Her father, who worked for a New York cab company, was a great-great-grandson of the American patriot Paul Revere. Sampson's parents married in 1885, around five years after her mother had emigrated from Ireland.

Sampson began her stage career with a two-year run in Gus Edwards’ vaudeville skit "School Days" and later a season with Blanche Ring in "Wall Street Girls". After appearing in the comedy show “When Claudius Smiles” Sampson began her film career under the direction of D. W. Griffith in motion pictures made in New York and later Hollywood.

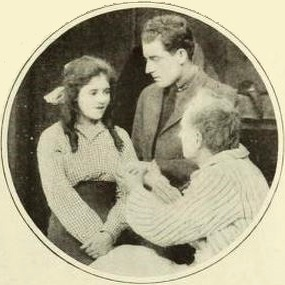
Still from the American western film Sympathy Sal (1915) with Teddy Sampson

Teddy Sampson's earliest known film, D. W. Griffith's The Life of General Villa (1914), featured Pancho Villa as himself with Sampson in the role of one of his sisters. Nearly 90 years later, actress Alexa Davalos played Sampson in the HBO film And Starring Pancho Villa as Himself (2003).

Sampson went on to play in Christie Comedies, "Smiling Bill" Parson Comedies, and in a number of films starring her husband, comedian Ford Sterling. Her marriage to Sterling, though at times rocky, lasted some 25 years and only ended after his death in 1939. Teddy Sampson died in Los Angeles more than 30 years later on November 24, 1970.

== Partial filmography ==
- The Life of General Villa (1914)
- The Slave Girl (1915)
- The Pretty Sister of Jose (1915)
- The Outlaw's Revenge (1915)
- Sympathy Sal (1915)
- The Fatal Glass of Beer (1916)
- As in a Looking Glass (1916)
- The Weakness of Man (1916)
- Hickory Hiram (1918)
- Her American Husband (1918)
- Bits of Life (1921)
- The Chicken in the Case (1921)
- Outcast (1922)
- The Bad Man (1923)
