= Sarah Y. Mason =

American screenwriter

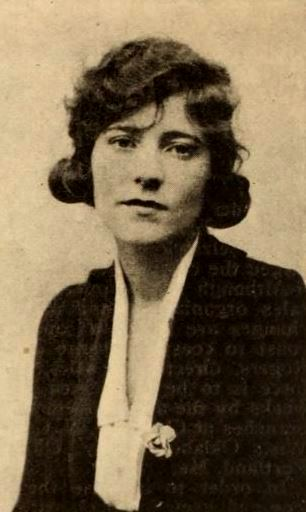
- Mason in 1920
- Born: Sarah Yeiser Mason; March 31, 1896; Pima, Arizona, U.S.
- Died: November 28, 1980 (aged 84); Los Angeles, California, U.S.
- Occupation: Screenwriter
- Years active: 1918–1949
- Spouse: Victor Heerman (m. 1921)
- Children: 2

Sarah Y. Mason (March 31, 1896 – November 28, 1980) was an Academy Award winning American screenwriter and script supervisor.

== Biography ==
Mason was born Sarah Yeiser Mason in Pima, Arizona. She and her husband Victor Heerman married in 1921 and won the Academy Award for best screenplay adaptation for their adaptation for the 1933 film Little Women, based on the novel by Louisa May Alcott. She left no known records or documentation of her life or work. All the knowledge acquired about her is gathered though the records her husband left.

After that success, she and Heerman were the first screenwriters involved in early, never-produced scripts commissioned for what would become MGM's Pride and Prejudice (1940 film). Mason's career is also notable as she was the very first script supervisor in Hollywood, having invented the craft of film continuity when the industry switched from silent film to talkies.

She died at age 84 in Los Angeles and was cremated. Victor and Sarah had two children, Catharine Anliss Heerman, an artist and teacher of art in Southern California who was previously married to record producer Lester Koenig; and Victor, Jr., a successful breeder of thoroughbred racehorses. The Academy Award for Little Women remains with the family.

== Partial filmography ==
- Arizona (1918) (continuity)
- Bound in Morocco (1918) (continuity)
- The Poor Simp (1920) (scenario)
- Held In Trust (1920) (scenario)
- The Chicken in the Case (1921)
- A Divorce of Convenience (1921)
- The Girl from Nowhere (1921)
- Modern Matrimony (1923)
- Backstage (1927)
- Cradle Snatchers (1927) (scenario)
- The Broadway Melody (1929) (continuity)
- Alias Jimmy Valentine (1928) (continuity)
- Little Women (1933) (screenplay)
- The Age of Innocence (1934) (screenplay)
- Imitation of Life (1934) (uncredited)
- The Little Minister (1934) (screenplay)
- Break of Hearts (1935) (screen play)
- Magnificent Obsession (1935) (screenplay)
- Stella Dallas (1937) (screenplay)
- Golden Boy (1939) (screenplay)
- Pride and Prejudice (1940) (uncredited)
- Meet Me in St. Louis: 1944 (uncredited)
- Little Women (1949) (screenplay)
- A Girl, a Guy, and a Gob (1941) (uncredited)
- Magnificent Obsession (1954) (based upon the screenplay by)
