= Little Women (1949 film) =

1949 film by Mervyn LeRoy

- Theatrical release poster
- Directed by: Mervyn LeRoy
- Screenplay by: Andrew Solt; Sarah Y. Mason; Victor Heerman
- Based on: Little Women; 1868 novel by Louisa May Alcott
- Produced by: Mervyn LeRoy
- Starring: June Allyson; Peter Lawford; Margaret O'Brien; Elizabeth Taylor; Janet Leigh; Rossano Brazzi; Mary Astor
- Cinematography: Robert H. Planck; Charles Schoenbaum
- Edited by: Ralph E. Winters
- Music by: Adolph Deutsch; Max Steiner (musical score)
- Color process: Technicolor
- Production company: Metro-Goldwyn-Mayer
- Distributed by: Loew's Inc.
- Release date: March 10, 1949
- Running time: 121 minutes
- Country: United States
- Language: English
- Budget: $2,776,000
- Box office: $5,910,000

Little Women is a 1949 American coming-of-age romantic drama film produced and directed by Mervyn LeRoy from a screenplay by Andrew Solt, Sarah Y. Mason, and Victor Heerman, based on the 1868–1869 two-volume novel of the same name by Louisa May Alcott. Filmed in Technicolor, the film stars June Allyson, Peter Lawford, Margaret O'Brien, Elizabeth Taylor, Janet Leigh, Rossano Brazzi, and Mary Astor. The original music score was composed by Adolph Deutsch and Max Steiner. Little Women includes the American film debut of Italian actor Rossano Brazzi, and the final film appearance of C. Aubrey Smith, who died in 1948.

== Plot ==
In the small town of Concord, Massachusetts, during the Civil War, the March sisters—Meg, Jo, Amy, and Beth—live with their mother in a state of genteel poverty, their father having lost the family's fortune to an unscrupulous businessman several years earlier. While Mr. March serves in the Union Army, Mrs. March, affectionately referred to as "Marmee" by her daughters, holds the family together and teaches the girls the importance of giving to those less fortunate than themselves, especially during the upcoming Christmas season. Although the spoiled and vain Amy often bemoans the family's lack of material wealth and social status, Jo, an aspiring writer, keeps everyone entertained with her stories and plays, while the youngest March daughter, the shy and sensitive Beth, accompanies Jo's productions on an out-of-tune piano.

The spirited Jo, a tomboy in search of male companionship, strikes up a friendship with Theodore "Laurie" Laurence, the grandson of the March's wealthy, but cantankerous neighbor, James Laurence. Later that winter, Jo so impresses Mr. Laurence with her forthrightness and her beneficial effect on the brooding Laurie, that he invites the March sisters to a fancy dress ball at his sumptuous home. At the ball, Meg is courted by John Brooke, Laurie's tutor, and Jo consents to dance with Laurie while Amy and Beth breathlessly view the scene from their perch atop the staircase. Mr. Laurence's gruff demeanor is softened upon meeting Beth, who reminds him of the beloved granddaughter he lost, and when he learns of her musical talent, he offers her the use of his grand piano. The beautiful evening ends on a sour note, however, when Amy and Beth overhear the snobbish Mrs. Gardiner and her daughter gossiping about Marmee.

As the weeks pass, Laurie's affection for Jo grows, but Jo rebuffs him as a suitor, claiming that although she loves him as a friend, she will never marry. Meanwhile, Jo attempts to discourage Meg's deepening feelings for Mr. Brooke, fearing that a marriage will break the bond between the sisters. One day, Beth sends slippers to Mr Laurence, to thank him to let her play on his piano. The old gentleman, very pleased by Beth's gift, offers her a beautiful piano which belonged to his granddaughter. Beth is so moved that she forgets her shyness, goes to the big house and throws herself into Mr Laurence's arms to thank him. Both of them became close friends from that moment on.

Spring arrives, and Marmee receives word that Mr. March has been wounded and sent to an Army hospital in Washington, D.C. Jo asks her wealthy Aunt March for Marmee's train fare, but the two have a heated argument when the impatient Jo refuses to address Aunt March with the decorum the proud woman demands. As usual, Aunt March comes through for the family, but not before Jo has had her beautiful chestnut locks cut off and sold in order to pay for Marmee's trip. While carrying out Marmee's work for the poor in her absence, Beth contracts scarlet fever, and the distressed and frightened sisters realize how much they depend upon Marmee. Just as Marmee returns, however, Beth's fever breaks, and the entire family is reunited when Laurie arranges for the surprise return of Mr. March.

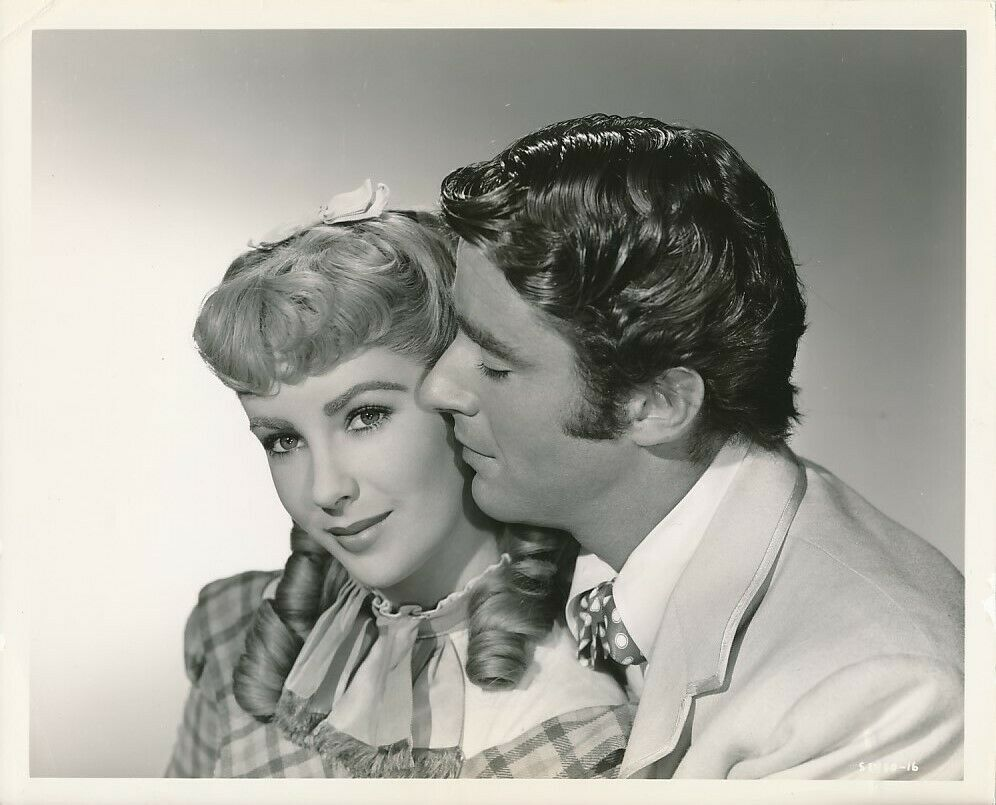
Elizabeth Taylor and Peter Lawford in a promotional photo for Little Women, 1949.

A few months later, Meg marries Mr. Brooke and Laurie asks Jo to marry him, but she turns him down, explaining that she is uncomfortable in high society and wishes to devote her life to writing. Greatly disappointed, Laurie leaves for Europe, and Jo, saddened by the seeming loss of both Meg and Laurie, who she considers to be her best friend, moves to New York to pursue her career. While boarding at the home of the Kirke family, Jo meets Professor Bhaer, the Kirke children's German tutor, who introduces her to art museums and the opera. Bhaer later agrees to read Jo's stories, but she is devastated when he later criticizes her work, dismissing it as sensationalistic. Bursting into tears, Jo reveals that she feels abandoned by Laurie and hurt that Aunt March, who had long promised her a trip to Europe, has taken Amy instead. After consoling Jo, with whom he has fallen in love, Professor Bhaer advises her to write from her heart, and Jo decides to return home where she is needed, for Beth is again very ill. Upon her return to the now nearly empty March household, Jo learns that her beloved Beth is dying and spends the next few weeks caring for the courageous girl, who bears her suffering without complaint.

After Beth's death, Jo assuages her grief by writing a novel entitled My Beth, which she sends to Professor Bhaer for his opinion. Later, Meg, now the mother of twins, gently informs Jo that Laurie and Amy have fallen in love in Europe and are to be married. Although Jo is happy for the couple, she realizes for the first time how lonely she is and how much she wishes to be loved. A few weeks later, Laurie and Amy return as husband and wife, and the Marches joyfully celebrate the family's reunion. The festivities are interrupted when Professor Bhaer arrives with Jo's novel, which he has had published. However, when Laurie answers the door, Bhaer mistakenly assumes that Jo has married her friend; he politely declines Laurie's invitation to join the party, and departs. After Jo catches up to him, the two embrace and he proposes marriage. Jo happily accepts, then leads her future husband back to the warmth of the house, where her family awaits them.

== Cast ==
- June Allyson as Josephine "Jo" March
- Peter Lawford as Theodore "Laurie" Laurence
- Margaret O'Brien as Elizabeth "Beth" March
- Elizabeth Taylor as Amy March
- Janet Leigh as Margaret "Meg" March
- Rossano Brazzi as Professor Friedrich Bhaer
- Mary Astor as Margaret "Marmee" March
- Lucile Watson as Aunt Josephine March
- C. Aubrey Smith as James Laurence
- Elizabeth Patterson as Hannah Mullet
- Leon Ames as Robert March
- Harry Davenport as Dr. Barnes
- Richard Stapley as John Brooke
- Connie Gilchrist as Mrs. Kirke
- Ellen Corby as Sophie

Uncredited

- Harlan Briggs as Old Crony at Grace's store
- Frank Darien as Crony at Grace's store
- Lisa Golm as Mrs. Hummel
- Olin Howland as Mr. Davis, Amy's teacher
- Isabel Randolph as Mrs. Gardiner, snobbish woman at party
- Will Wright as Mr. Grace, the store Proprietor

== Production ==
=== Development ===
David O. Selznick was originally going to produce the film. Filming began in September 1946 but Selznick decided he could not tackle a major production so soon after the ordeal of filming Duel in the Sun (1946) so he sold the property and script to MGM. The cast for the David O. Selznick version included Jennifer Jones (Jo), Diana Lynn (Amy), Bambi Linn (Beth), Rhonda Fleming (Meg) and Anne Revere (Marmee). The adapted screenplay was written by Andrew Solt, Sarah Y. Mason, and Victor Heerman. Sally Benson served as a script consultant.

=== Narrative ===
- In this version, Beth March (Margaret O'Brien) is portrayed as being several years younger than Amy March (Elizabeth Taylor), while in the book she is a year older. In fact, the age range of the four sisters at the beginning of the book is just five years: Meg (16), Jo (15), Beth (13), Amy (12) and the story spans about 10 years. But the roles in this 1948 production are played by actresses whose ages range 20 years: Janet Leigh (born 1927), June Allyson (1917), Margaret O'Brien (1937), Elizabeth Taylor (1932).
- Instead of first meeting at a New Year's Eve party, Jo and Laurie first see each other when the March girls are taking their breakfast to the Hummels, and Jo visits Laurie while he is sick and confined to the house before as well.
- When the girls attend the New Year's Eve party, all four of the girls go, rather than just Meg and Jo as presented in the novel. They leave early because Beth is upset over hearing from other people that Mrs. March had plans to marry them off well.
- At the beginning of the book, when the March sisters are each given a dollar to spend at their pleasure, they all decide to buy something for their mother. In the film, while they eventually do buy presents for their mother, they initially purchase things for themselves.
- In the book, Amy is pulled out of school when her teacher, Mr. Davis, strikes her across the hand with a ruler when she hides limes in her desk; but in the movie, she is in trouble for drawing pictures on her slate, and she is not struck.
- Several other scenes are left out, such as the group picnic, when Amy falls through the ice after following Jo and Laurie to the river, and when Amy and Laurie fall in love in Europe.
- Jo and Laurie, while best friends in the book—Jo even having a special nickname for him ("Teddy")—have a still somewhat close but much less intimate relationship in the film.

== Release ==
Originally intended as a 1948 release, the premiere of Little Women was delayed until March 1949, when it was presented as the Easter attraction at Radio City Music Hall in New York City. It is believed that the reason for the delay was to make the movie part of Metro-Goldwyn-Mayer's Silver Anniversary Celebration.

Little Women became one of the top-grossing films of 1949. According to MGM records it earned $3,425,000 in the US and Canada, and $2,495,000 overseas resulting in a profit of $812,000.

== Reception ==
=== Critical response ===
Bosley Crowther of The New York Times wrote that the first part of the film was "a pretty agreeable assortment of period fun and sentiment", but the latter part "got away from the scriptwriters" with a "perceptible deflation" in its spirit once it became serious. Of June Allyson's performance, Crowther wrote that "Comparisons of course, are odious, but if memory serves us well, she can't hold a bayberry candle to the Jo of Katharine Hepburn of fifteen years ago." John McCarten of The New Yorker wrote that unlike the previous film version, the remake left him "dry-eyed" and agreed that Allyson "tries hard to be as diverting as Miss Hepburn was years ago, even to the extent of imitating her peculiar vocalizations every now and then, but somehow she isn't quite as persuasive as her predecessor." Harrison's Reports called the film "wholesome entertainment, with great sentimental appeal," but "beautiful as it is in its old-fashioned charm, human appeal, and comedy situations, its oozing sentiment, judged by present standards, seems out of tune." A mostly positive review in Variety praised LeRoy's direction as "tasteful" and, while agreeing that the Victorian sentiment of the book was "too meticulously preserved" in the film and "a bit out of joint with our times," found that Allyson's performance "dominates the film" and "shows that there is meat in the role for more than one actress."

The film has an approval rating of 75% on review aggregator website Rotten Tomatoes, based on 8 reviews, and an average rating of 6/10. Metacritic assigned the film a weighted average score of 61 out of 100, based on 5 critics, indicating "generally favourable reviews".

=== Accolades ===
Award	Category	Nominee(s)	Result	Ref
Academy Awards	Best Art Direction-Set Decoration – Color	Cedric Gibbons, Paul Groesse, Edwin B. Willis and Jack D. Moore	Won	
Academy Awards	Best Cinematography – Color	Robert H. Planck and Charles Schoenbaum	Nominated	

== See also ==
- List of films and television shows about the American Civil War
- Little Women (1917 film)
- Little Women (1918 film)
- Little Women (1933 film)
- Little Women (1994 film)
- Little Women (2018 film)
- Little Women (2019 film)
