= Robin Hood (1912 film) =

1912 film

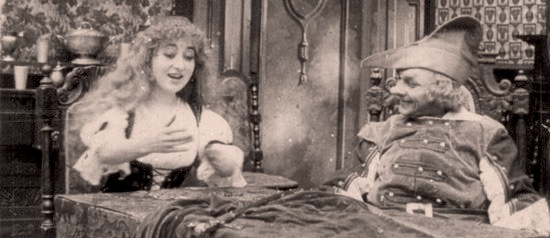
- Scene from the film
- Directed by: Étienne Arnaud; Herbert Blaché
- Written by: Eustace Hale Ball
- Produced by: Éclair American
- Starring: Robert Frazer; Barbara Tennant
- Distributed by: Universal Film Manufacturing Company
- Release date: August 22, 1912 (United States)
- Running time: 30 minutes
- Country: United States
- Language: English

Robin Hood

Robin Hood is a 1912 film made by Eclair Studios. The film's costumes feature enormous versions of the familiar hats of Robin and his merry men, and uses the unusual effect of momentarily superimposing images of different animals over each character to emphasize their good or evil qualities. The film was directed by Étienne Arnaud and Herbert Blaché, and written by Eustace Hale Ball. A restored copy of the 30-minute film exists and was exhibited in 2006 at the Museum of Modern Art in New York City.

== Cast ==
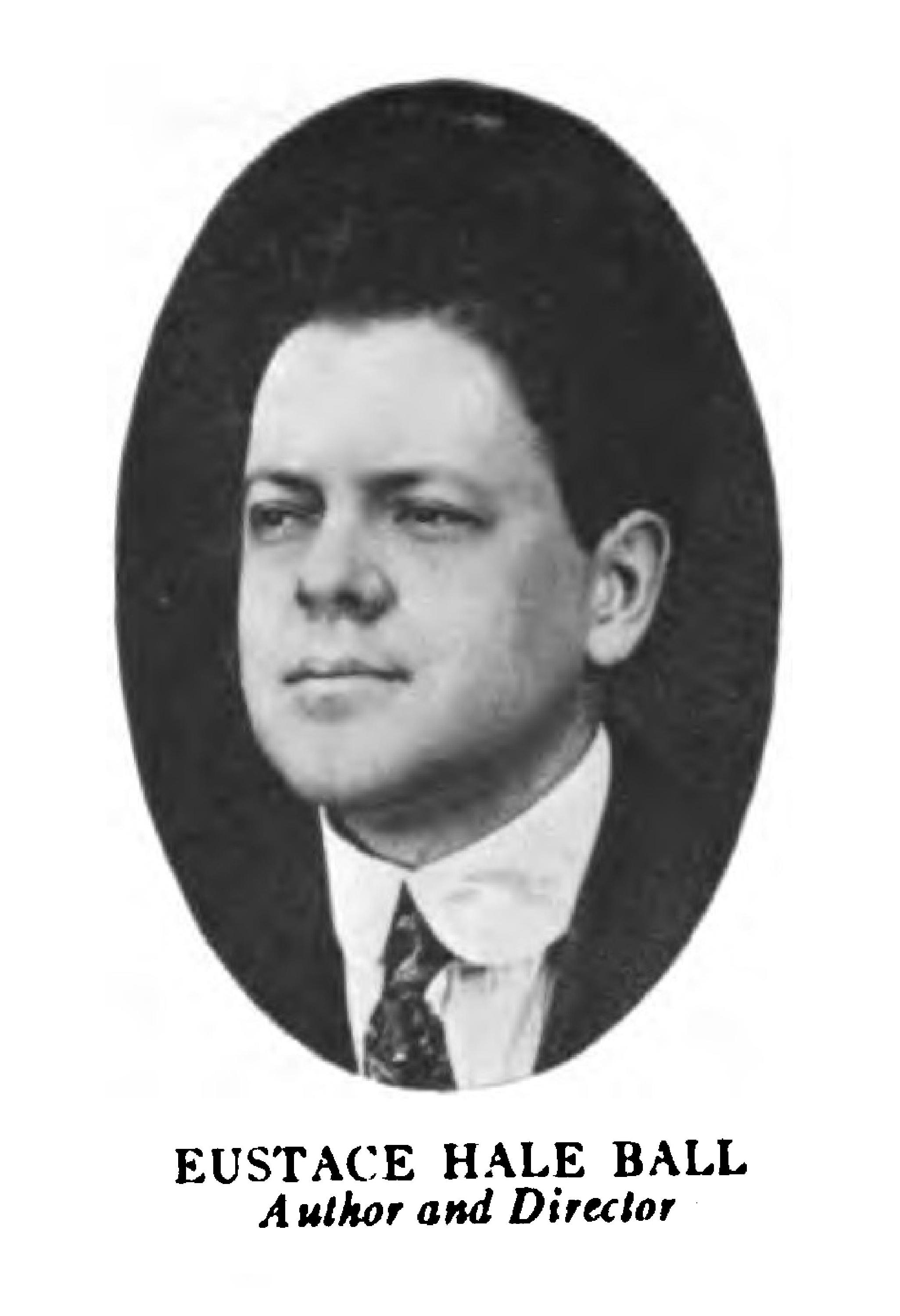
Screenwriter for Robin Hood

- Robert Frazer ... Robin Hood
- Barbara Tennant ... Maid Marian
- Alec B. Francis ... Sheriff of Nottingham
- Julia Stuart ... Sheriff's Housekeeper
- Mathilde Baring ... Maid at Merwyn's
- Isabel Lamon ... Fennel
- Muriel Ostriche ... Christabel
- M. E. Hannefy ... Friar Tuck
- Guy Oliver ... Guy Oliver
- George Larkin ... Alan-a-Dale
- Charles Hundt ... Will Scarlet
- John Troyano ... Much
- Arthur Hollingsworth ... Richard the Lion-Hearted
- Lamar Johnstone ... Guy of Gisbourne
- John G. Adolfi ... Thomas Merwin
- Gonzalo Meroño ... Richard Steward
- Jaime Sánchez ... Matt Edward
- Adrián López ... John Murphy
- Pablo Alvarez Fraile ... Will Tuck
- Alejandro Campillo Yañez ... Lamon Yañez Sarasa

== See also ==
- List of films and television series featuring Robin Hood
