= The Little Minister (1934 film) =

1934 film by Richard Wallace

- Theatrical release poster
- Directed by: Richard Wallace
- Written by: Jane Murfin; Sarah Y. Mason; Victor Heerman
- Based on: The Little Minister; 1891 novel and play by J. M. Barrie
- Produced by: Pandro S. Berman
- Starring: Katharine Hepburn; John Beal; Alan Hale
- Cinematography: Henry W. Gerrard
- Edited by: William Hamilton
- Music by: Max Steiner
- Production company: RKO Radio Pictures
- Distributed by: RKO Radio Pictures
- Release date: December 28, 1934
- Running time: 110 minutes
- Country: United States
- Language: English
- Budget: $648,000
- Box office: $1,104,000

The Little Minister is a 1934 American historical drama film starring Katharine Hepburn and directed by Richard Wallace. The screenplay by Jane Murfin, Sarah Y. Mason, and Victor Heerman is based on the 1891 novel and subsequent 1897 play of the same title by J. M. Barrie. The picture was the fifth film adaptation of the works, following four silent film versions. The original novel was the third of the three "Thrums" novels (a town based on his home of Kirriemuir), which first brought Barrie to fame.

== Plot ==
Set in rural 1840s Scotland, the film explores labor and class issues while telling the story of Gavin Dishart, a staid cleric who is newly assigned to Thrums' Auld Licht church, and Babbie, a member of the nobility who disguises herself as a gypsy girl in order to interact freely with the local villagers and protect them from her betrothed, Lord Rintoul, who wants to keep them under his control. The townsfolk christen Dishart “The Little Minister” on his arrival because of his youth (this is his first parish) and his short stature. Initially the conservative Dishart is appalled by the feisty girl, but he soon comes to appreciate her inner goodness. Their romantic liaison scandalizes the townspeople, and the minister's position is jeopardized until Dishart's heroism stuns and transforms the hearts of the local villagers.

== Cast ==
- Katharine Hepburn as Babbie
- John Beal as Reverend Gavin Dishart
- Alan Hale as Rob Dow
- Donald Crisp as Doctor McQueen
- Lumsden Hare as Tammas Whammond
- Andy Clyde as Wearyworld, the policeman
- Beryl Mercer as Mrs. Margaret Dishart, Gavin's mother
- Billy Watson as Micah Dow
- Dorothy Stickney as Jean Proctor
- Mary Gordon as Nanny Webster
- Frank Conroy as Lord Milford Rintoul
- Eily Malyon as Lady Evalina Rintoul
- Reginald Denny as Captain Halliwell
- Leonard Carey as Hendry Munn
- Herbert Bunston as Mr. Carfrae
- Harry Beresford as John Spens
- Barlowe Borland as Snecky Hobart

== Production ==
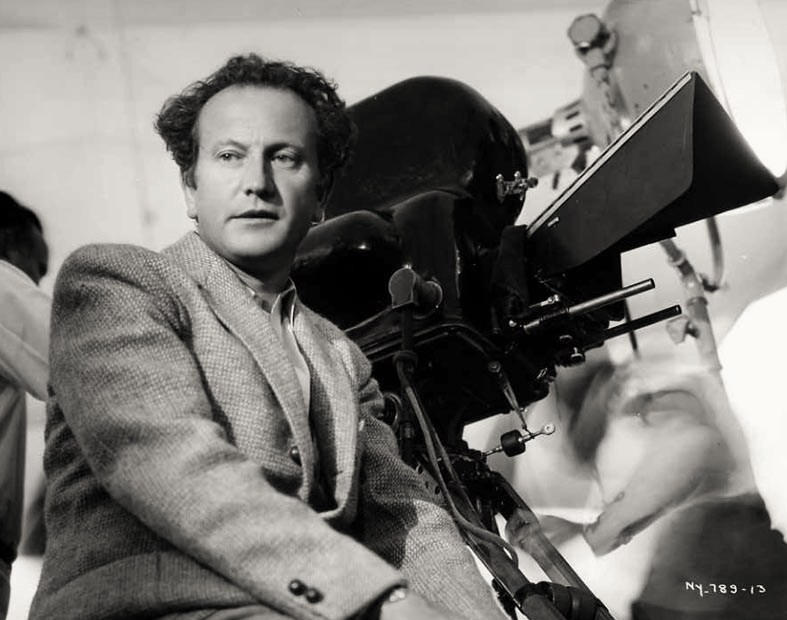
Director Richard Wallace on the set of The Little Minister

Katharine Hepburn initially rejected the role of Babbie, then reconsidered, against the advice of her agent Leland Hayward, when Margaret Sullavan was offered the role. The film was budgeted at $650,000, which at the time was considered a high amount, and much of it was spent on exterior shooting in California's Sherwood Forest and Laurel Canyon and on the elaborate village set constructed on RKO Forty Acres back lot. (It later was used in a number of films, including Laurel and Hardy's Bonnie Scotland). It was RKO's more expensive film of the year and the more expensive film in which Hepburn had appeared.

The soundtrack includes the traditional Scottish tunes "The Bonnie Banks O' Loch Lomond," "Comin' Thro' the Rye," and "House of Argyle." The 3-CD set Max Steiner: The RKO Years 1929-1936 includes 10 tracks of incidental music that Steiner composed for the film.

The film held its world premiere at Radio City Music Hall in New York City.

== Reception ==
In his review in The New York Times, Andre Sennwald described the film as "a tender and lovingly arranged screen edition of Sir James's rueful little Scottish romance ... in its mild-mannered and sober way, The Little Minister proves to be a photoplay of genuine charm."

The film was popular but its enormous cost resulted in a small loss of $9,000 and contributed to Hepburn's reputation as "box-office poison."

Leonard Maltin gives The Little Minister three and a half out of four stars, calling the film "charming" and Hepburn "radiant".
