= John Smith (film) =

1922 American silent comedy film directed by Victor Heerman

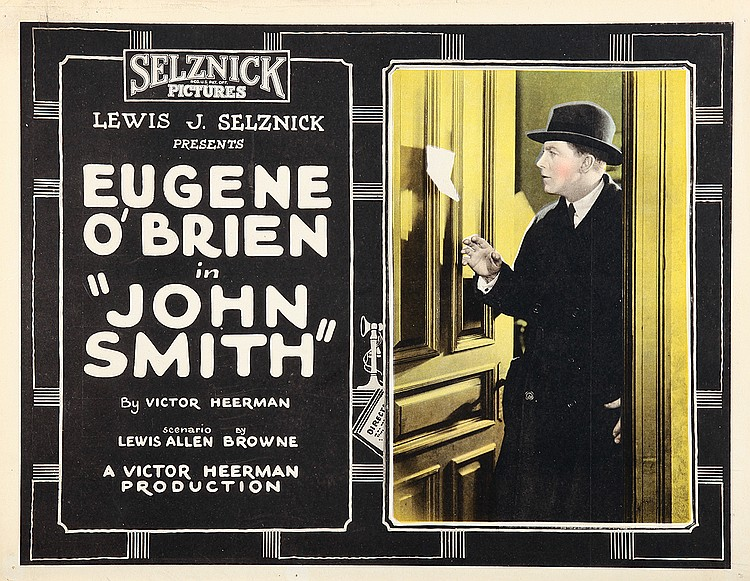
- Directed by: Victor Heerman
- Written by: Lewis Allen Browne (scenario)
- Story by: Victor Heerman
- Produced by: Lewis J. Selznick
- Starring: Eugene O'Brien
- Cinematography: Jules Cronjager
- Distributed by: Selznick Pictures
- Release date: June 10, 1922
- Running time: 60 minutes
- Country: United States
- Language: Silent (English intertitles)

John Smith is a lost 1922 American silent comedy film produced and distributed by Selznick Pictures and directed by Victor Heerman. The film stars veteran Eugene O'Brien and features an early appearance by Mary Astor.

== Cast ==
- Eugene O'Brien as John Smith
- Vivia Ogden as Cook
- W.J. Ferguson as Butler
- Tammany Young as Chauffeur
- Estar Banks as Mrs. Lang
- Frankie Mann as Maid
- Mary Astor as Irene Mason
- George Fawcett as Haynes
- J. Barney Sherry as Martin Lang
- John Butler as Crook
- Walter Greene as District Attorney
- Warren Cook as Doctor
- Henry Sedley as Lawyer
- Daniel L. Haynes as Gangster
