= List of crime films before 1930 =

This is a list of crime films released before 1930.

Title	Director	Cast	Country	Genre/Notes
1895
The Arrest of a Pickpocket	Birt Acres		United Kingdom	Short film
1900
Sherlock Holmes Baffled	Arthur Marvin		United States	Short film
1902
Bluebeard	Georges Méliès	Georges Méliès, Jeanne d'Alcy	France	Short film
1912
The Musketeers of Pig Alley	D.W. Griffith	Alfred Paget, Walter Miller, Jack Pickford	United States	Short film
1913
Fantômas	Louis Feuillade	René Navarre, Edmond Breon, Georges Melchior, Renee Carl	France	Film serial
Traffic in Souls	George Loane Tucker	Jane Gail, Ethel Grandin, William H. Turner	United States	Crime drama
1915
Les Vampires	Louis Feuillade	Jean Aymé, Marcel Lévesque, Musidora, Stacia Napierkowska	France	Film serial
Regeneration	Raoul Walsh	Rockliffe Fellowes, Anna Q. Nilsson, James A. Marcus, Carl Harbaugh	United States	Crime drama
1920
The Penalty	Wallace Worsley	Ethel Grey Terry, Milton Ross, Lon Chaney	United States	Crime drama
1922
Dr. Mabuse: The Gambler	Fritz Lang	Rudolf Klein-Rogge, Aud Egede Nissen, Gertrude Welcker, Alfred Abel	Germany	Master criminal film
1923
Bulldog Drummond	Oscar Apfel	Carlyle Blackwell, Evelyn Greeley	United Kingdom	
The Street	Karl Grune	Aud Egede-Nissen	Germany	Crime drama
White Tiger	Priscilla Dean		United States	
1925
Bulldog Drummond's Third Round			United Kingdom	
The Pleasure Garden	Alfred Hitchcock	Virginia Valli, Carmelita Geraghty	United Kingdom	
1927
Chicago	Frank Urson	Phyllis Haver, Victor Varconi, Eugene Pallette, Virginia Bradford	United States	
The Return of Boston Blackie	Harry Hoyt		United States	
Underworld	Josef von Sternberg	George Bancroft, Clive Brook, Evelyn Brent	United States	Crime drama, Gangster film
1928
The Big City	Tod Browning	Lon Chaney, Marceline Day, Betty Compson	United States	
The Dragnet	Josef von Sternberg, Helen Lewis	George Bancroft, Evelyn Brent, William Powell	United States	Crime drama
Ladies of the Mob	William Wellman	Clara Bow, Richard Arlen, Helen Lynch, Carl Gerard	United States	Crime drama
Lights of New York	Bryan Foy	Helene Costello, Cullen Landis, Gladys Brockwell	United States	
Me, Gangster	Raoul Walsh	Don Terry, June Collyer, Anders Randolf	United States	
The Racket	Lewis Milestone	Thomas Meighan, Marie Prevost, Louis Wolheim	United States	Crime drama, Gangster film
1929
Alibi	Roland West	Chester Morris, Harry Stubbs, Mae Busch	United States	
The Last Warning	Paul Leni	Laura La Plante, Montagu Love, Mack Swain, Roy D'Arcy	United States	
Thunderbolt	Josef von Sternberg, William Wyler	George Bancroft, Fay Wray, Richard Arlen	United States	Crime drama, Prison film
