= The Last Command (1928 film) =

1928 film

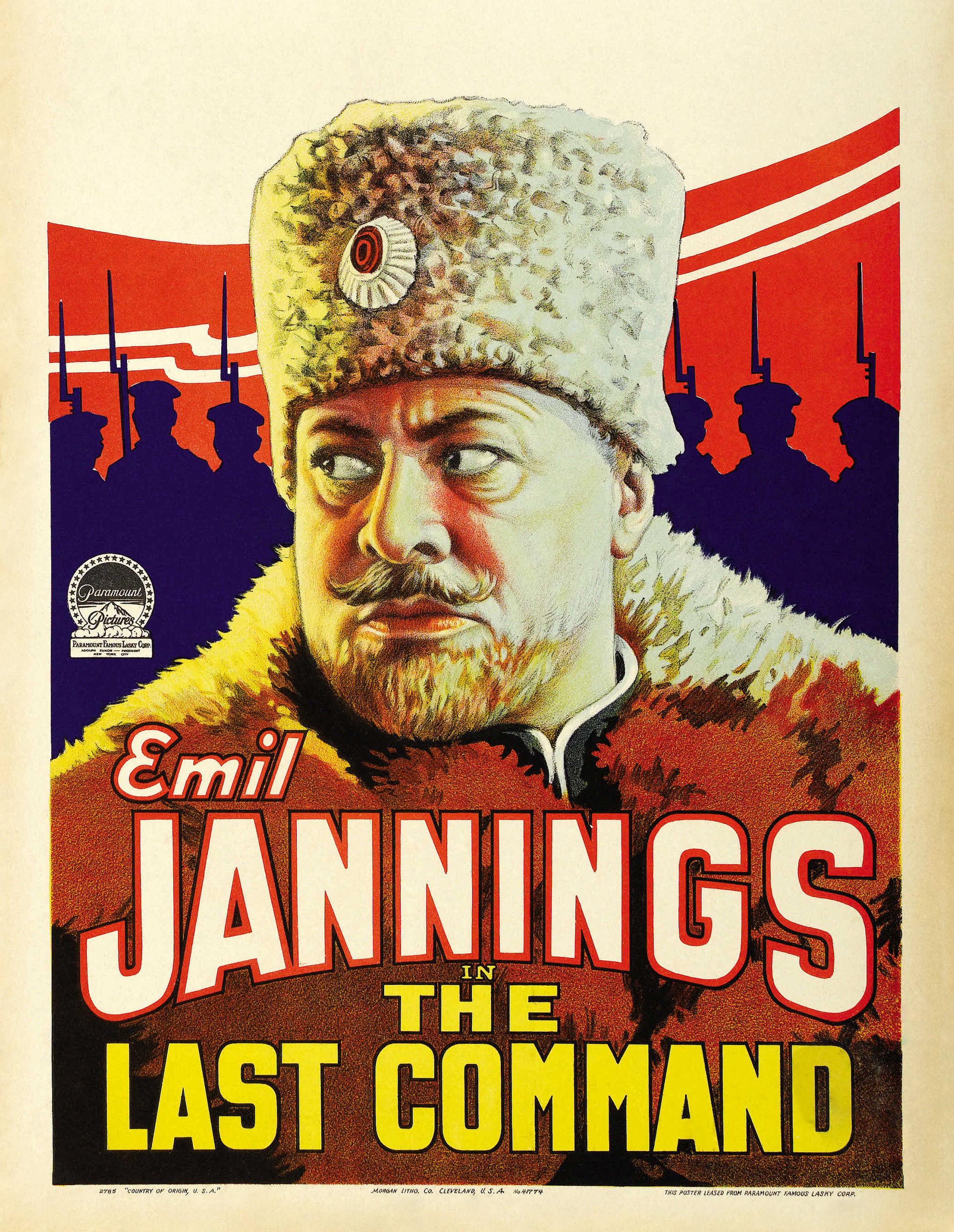
- Directed by: Josef von Sternberg
- Written by: John F. Goodrich; Herman J. Mankiewicz (titles)
- Story by: Lajos Bíró; Josef von Sternberg
- Produced by: Adolph Zukor; Jesse L. Lasky
- Starring: Emil Jannings; Evelyn Brent; William Powell
- Cinematography: Bert Glennon
- Edited by: William Shea
- Production company: Paramount Famous Lasky Corp.
- Distributed by: Paramount Pictures
- Release date: January 22, 1928
- Running time: 85 minutes
- Country: United States
- Languages: Silent; English intertitles

The Last Command is a 1928 American silent romantic drama film directed by Josef von Sternberg, and written by John F. Goodrich and Herman J. Mankiewicz from a story by Lajos Bíró. The film stars Emil Jannings, who won the first Academy Award for Best Actor in a Leading Role at the 1929 ceremony for his performances in this film and The Way of All Flesh, the only year multiple roles were considered. Evelyn Brent and William Powell co-star.

In 2006, the film was deemed "culturally, historically, or aesthetically significant" by the United States Library of Congress and selected for preservation in the National Film Registry.

== Plot ==
The Last Command (1928)

In 1928 Hollywood, director Leo Andreyev looks through photographs for actors for his next movie. When he comes to the picture of an aged Sergius Alexander, he pauses, then tells his assistant to cast the man. Sergius shows up at the Eureka Studio with a horde of other extras and is issued a general's uniform. As he is dressing, another actor complains that his continual head twitching is distracting. Sergius apologizes and explains that it is the result of a great shock he once experienced.

The film then flashes back ten years to Czarist Russia, which is in the midst of the Revolution. Grand Duke Sergius Alexander, the Czar's cousin and commander of all his armies, is informed by his adjutant that two actors entertaining the troops have been identified as dangerous "revolutionists" during a routine passport check. He decides to toy with them for his amusement. When one of them, Leo Andreyev, becomes insolent, Sergius whips him across the face and has him jailed.

Leo's companion, the beautiful Natalie Dabrova, is an entirely different matter. She intrigues Sergius. Despite the danger she poses, he takes her along with him. After a week, he gives her a pearl necklace as a token of his feelings for her. She comes to realize that he is at heart a man of great honor who loves Russia as deeply as she does. When she invites him to her room, he spots a partially hidden pistol, but deliberately turns his back to her. She draws the weapon, but cannot fire. Despite their political differences, she has fallen in love with him.

When the Bolsheviks capture the train on which they are traveling, she pretends to despise him. Instead of having him shot out of hand like his officers, she suggests they have him stoke coal into the locomotive all the way to Petrograd, where he will be publicly hanged. This is a ruse to keep him alive and, when everyone on board is drunk, she helps him escape, giving him back the pearl necklace to finance his way out of the country. Sergius jumps from the train, then watches in horror as it tumbles off a nearby bridge into the icy river below, taking Natalie with it. This moment is when Sergius develops his head twitch.

Ten years later, Sergius is reduced to poverty, eking out a living as a Hollywood extra. When he and the director finally meet, Sergius recognizes him. Leo, in an ironic act calculated to humiliate him, casts him as a Russian general in a battle scene. He is directed to give a speech to a group of actors playing his dispirited men. When one soldier tries to incite a mutiny, telling the general that "you've given your last command", he whips the man in the face as instructed, just as he had once struck Leo. Losing his grip on reality, he imagines himself genuinely on the battlefield, besieged by enemies, and passionately urges his men to fight for Russia. Overstraining himself, he dies, inquiring with his last words if they have won. Moved, Leo tells him they have. The assistant remarks, "That guy was a great actor." Leo replies, "He was more than a great actor – he was a great man."

== Cast ==
- Emil Jannings as Grand Duke Sergius Alexander
- Evelyn Brent as Natalie "Natacha" Dabrova
- William Powell as Leo Andreyev
- Jack Raymond as the Assistant Director
- Nicholas Soussanin as the Adjutant
- Michael Visaroff as the Bodyguard
- Fritz Feld as A revolutionist

== Background ==
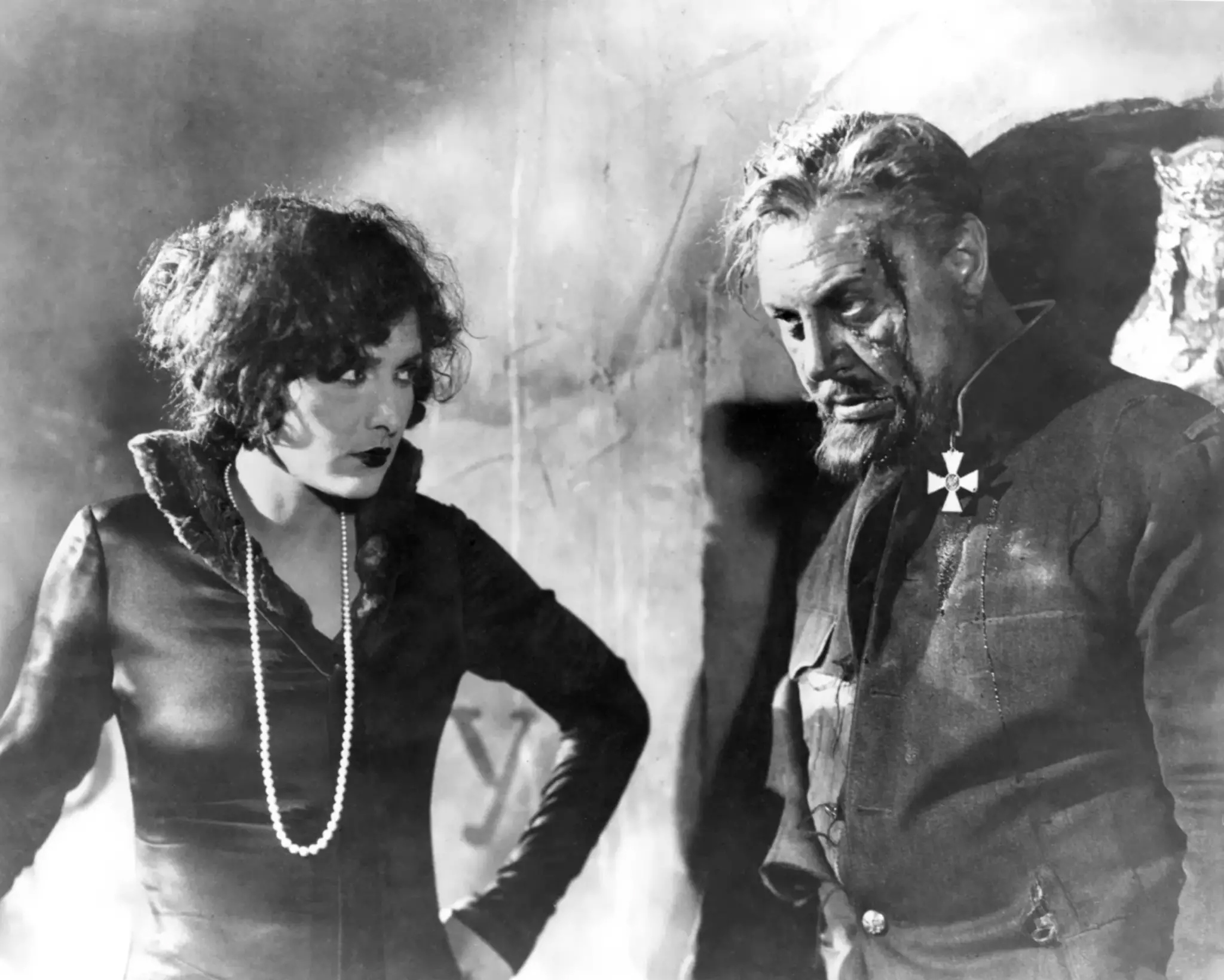
The Last Command, Evelyn Brent (left) and Emil Jannings

Proving the Hollywood adage that movie directors are "only as good as their last picture", Sternberg was given a free hand by Paramount when Underworld (1927) proved to be "an instant success".

The following three years experienced the industry-wide transition from silent to sound technology, during which Sternberg completed The Last Command (1928), The Drag Net (1929) and The Case of Lena Smith (1929), his last silent works, and his first talkie, Thunderbolt, in 1929. Though these films were praised by critics for their distinct style, none achieved great box-office success.

Before embarking on The Last Command, Paramount tasked Sternberg with editing portions of director Erich von Stroheim’s The Wedding March (1928), as well as writing the screenplay for director Mauritz Stiller’s The Street of Sin.

Ernst Lubitsch told newspaper columnist Gilbert Swan that the background story for The Last Command had a real-life inspiration: a General in the Imperial Russian Army named Theodore A. Lodijensky whom Lubitsch had met in Russia, and again in New York, where he had opened a Russian restaurant after fleeing the communist revolution. Lubitsch encountered the ex-general once more, when the latter appeared in full uniform looking for work as an extra at $7.50 a day, the same rate as Sergius. Lubitsch later told Lajos Bíró the anecdote. Under the name Theodore Lodi, Lodijensky went on to play a handful of roles between 1929 and 1935, including Grand Duke Michael, a Russian exile who is forced to work as a hotel doorman in the 1932 film Down to Earth.

== Production ==
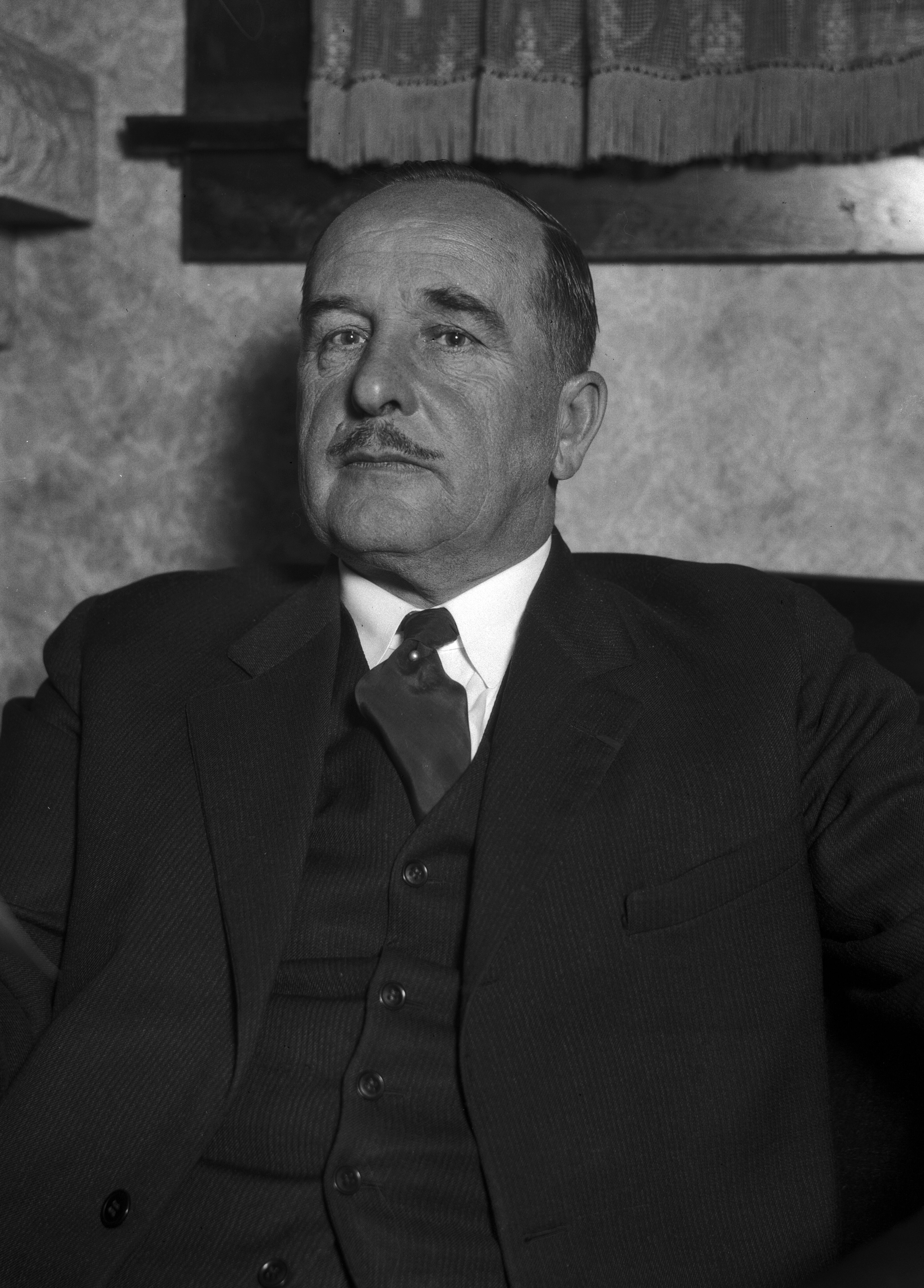
The story was inspired by Theodore Lodijensky.

In 1927, Paramount’s sister film company in Germany, Ufa, yielded its foremost actor Emil Jannings and producer Erich Pommer to make a number of movies in Hollywood. Sternberg and Jannings had established a friendly rapport when they met in Berlin in 1925.

Jannings starred in director Ernst Lubitsch’s The Patriot and in Victor Fleming’s The Way of All Flesh, but his performance in The Last Command surpassed these two productions.

The source of the script for the film has been termed “somewhat controversial”. Paramount attributed the original story entitled “The General” to screenwriter Lajos Bíró, the scenario to John S. Goodrich, and the titles to Herman J. Mankiewicz. Nevertheless, Sternberg's significant additions and alterations to the plot are “incontestable” and form the basis of his claim to “ultimate authorship” of this cinematic "masterpiece."

The Last Command was among “the most ambitious Sternberg ever shot”. The shooting was completed in five weeks.

The release of The Last Command was stalled when Paramount executives reviewed the film and discovered that Sternberg had inserted material portraying Hollywood as heartless and cynical. They further complained that he had historically misrepresented the Russian Revolution, including "recognizable portraits of Trotsky and the young Stalin". Only under duress from a wealthy Paramount stockholder did the studio relent and distribute the film. This was the "only time in his career that Sternberg confronted his own craft as a subject."

== Reception ==
Despite opening to “remarkable critical success” and eliciting “ecstatic reviews”, the box-office profits never materialized.

American playwright and filmmaker Preston Sturges declared The Last Command "perhaps the only perfect picture he had ever seen."

Despite its "commercial failure" the movie garnered a nomination for Best Original story, and Emil Jannings took the Oscar for Best Performance at the 1st Academy Awards.

Author and film critic Leonard Maltin awarded The Last Command four out of four stars, calling it "A fascinating story laced with keen perceptions of life and work in Hollywood.

== Theme ==
“The Last Command remains the greatest of the late silent films, more sophisticated, daring, and pitiless than any other save Greed (1923). And more than any other silent film, it pointed the way to the new harshness, the New York-inspired realism that was to come with the talkies…” —Biographer Charles Higham in The Art of the American Film (1973).

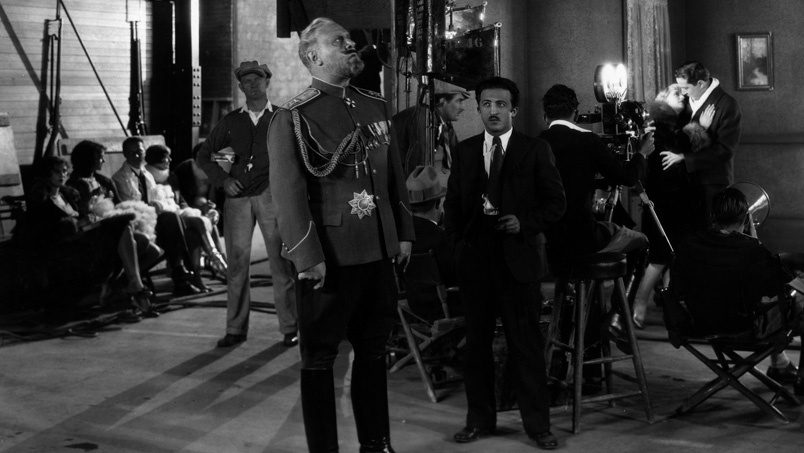
Grand Duke Sergius Alexander (Emil Jannings) and the Assistant Director (Jack Raymond): the Grand Duke "humbled for his arrogance" – reduced to a Hollywood extra

The themes presented in The Last Command reflect Sternberg's obsession as a film poet, exhibiting “a continuous stream of emotional autobiography” and “ most strikingly defines the importance for Sternberg of the intertwined themes of desire, power and instability of identity.”

Jannings’ General Sergius Alexander, an imperious member of the Russian Czar's royal family, is punished for his arrogance – not once, but twice: first stripped of prestige and power by the Bolshevik Revolution, and then reduced to a Hollywood extra performing a burlesque of his former stature. Flashback sequences reveal his precipitous descent, a fate that provided Jannings with the opportunity to exhibit “the extremes of his talent.”

According to Sarris the film is a “saga of decline and fall” – and arguably the most "Pirandellian" of Sternberg's work; Its characters wage a “desperate struggle for psychic survival that grant them "a measure of heroic stature and stoic calm.”

In a “performance of remarkable depth”, Evylen Brent's Bolshevik Revolutionary Natacha Dabrova develops “a relationship with Jannings as complex as anything in modern cinema.” On Sternberg's handling of Brent's Natacha, Film historian Andrew Sarris wrote: “[She], like all Sternbergian women, remains enigmatic beyond the demands of the plot. Her perverse nature operates beyond good and evil, beyond the convenient categories of virgins and vamps. What is unusual about Sternberg’s direction is that…he seeks to control performances not for the sake of simplicity, but for the sake of complexity.”

Sarris concludes his thematic analysis with this paradox:

”...It becomes impossible to tell what The Last Command means…The personal, the political, the aesthetic are all intertwined influences for Sternberg. We are left with no moral, no message, but only a partially resolved melodrama of pride and punishment, a work of art rich in overtones but pitched at too many different keys of interpretation. As a stylistic exercise, The Last Command is almost too much of a good thing.”

=== Home media ===
In 2010, The Criterion Collection released a DVD set titled, "3 Silent Classics by Josef von Sternberg" containing The Last Command, Underworld and The Docks of New York.

The film's copyright was renewed, and therefore it did not fall into the public domain in the United States until 2024.

== Sources ==
- Baxter, John. 1971. The Cinema of Josef von Sternberg. The International Film Guide Series. A.S Barners & Company, New York.
- Baxter, Peter, 1993. Just Watch! Paramount, Sternberg and America. British Film Institute, BFI Publishing. ISBN 0-85170-387-9
- Higham, Charles. 1973. The Art of the American Film: 1900–1971. Doubleday & Company, Inc. New York. ISBN 0-385-06935-9. Library of Congress Catalog Card Number 70-186026.
- Sarris, Andrew, 1966. The Films of Josef von Sternberg. New York: Doubleday. ASIN B000LQTJG4
- Sarris, Andrew. 1998. “You Ain’t Heard Nothin’ Yet.” The American Talking Film History & Memory, 1927–1949. Oxford University Press. ISBN 0-19-513426-5
- Weinberg, Herman G., 1967. Josef von Sternberg. A Critical Study. New York: Dutton.
