= The Drag Net =

1928 film

- Lobby card
- Directed by: Josef von Sternberg
- Written by: Jules Furthman (scenario); Charles Furthman (scenario); Herman J. Mankiewicz (titles)
- Based on: Nightstick by Oliver H. P. Garrett
- Produced by: Adolph Zukor; Jesse L. Lasky
- Starring: George Bancroft; Evelyn Brent
- Cinematography: Harold Rosson
- Edited by: Helen Lewis
- Distributed by: Paramount Pictures
- Release date: May 26, 1928
- Running time: 8 reels
- Country: United States
- Language: Silent (English intertitles)

The Drag Net, also known as The Dragnet, is a 1928 American silent crime drama film produced by Famous Players–Lasky and distributed by Paramount Pictures based on the story "Nightstick" by Oliver H.P. Garrett. It was directed by Josef von Sternberg from an original screen story and starring George Bancroft and Evelyn Brent.

== Plot ==
Film historian John Baxter provides a synopsis of it, a film "no longer known to exist in any archive":

Captain Timothy 'Two Gun' Nolan (George Bancroft) is appointed head of the New York detective force, and as his first act, rounds up every criminal in town – the 'drag net' of the title. Gang boss 'Dapper' Frank Trent (William Powell) stands bail for all of them, including 'The Magpie' (Evelyn Brent), as independent minor gang-leader [with complex alliances]. Nolan is particularly impressed by the girl, who affects caps of black-and-white feathers, and is attended by her own bodyguard of gunmen. She and the detective have a number of sexually charged encounters before her release. Setting out to get Trent, Nolan moves in on his hideout, assisted by his friend 'Shakespeare' (Leslie Fenton). Trent, armed with a machine gun, kills Shakespeare, but makes Nolan believe it is his shot that has done so. Nolan, for motives as obscure as those which motivated the futile round-up of the gangs, resigns his commission and becomes a drunk. Found unconscious by Trent, he is offered as the pièce de résistance at a gangland banquet which 'The Magpie' attends. Pitying the humiliated man, she discovers that he did not kill his friend, reveals the fact to him, and is reformed (and wounded) in the downfall of Trent, killed by Nolan in his steel-shuttered apartment.

== Cast ==
- George Bancroft as "Two-Gun" Nolan
- Evelyn Brent as "The Magpie"
- William Powell as "Dapper" Frank Trent
- Fred Kohler as 'Gabby' Steve
- Francis McDonald as "Sniper" Dawson
- Leslie Fenton as "Shakespeare"

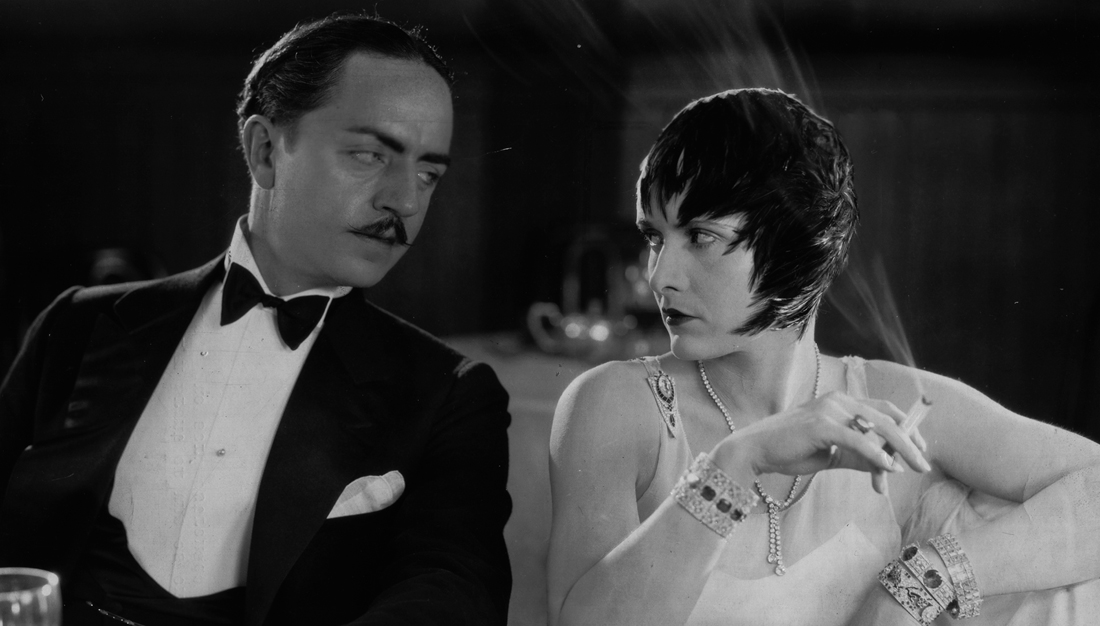
“Dapper” Frank Trent (William Powell) and “The Magpie” (Evelyn Brent)

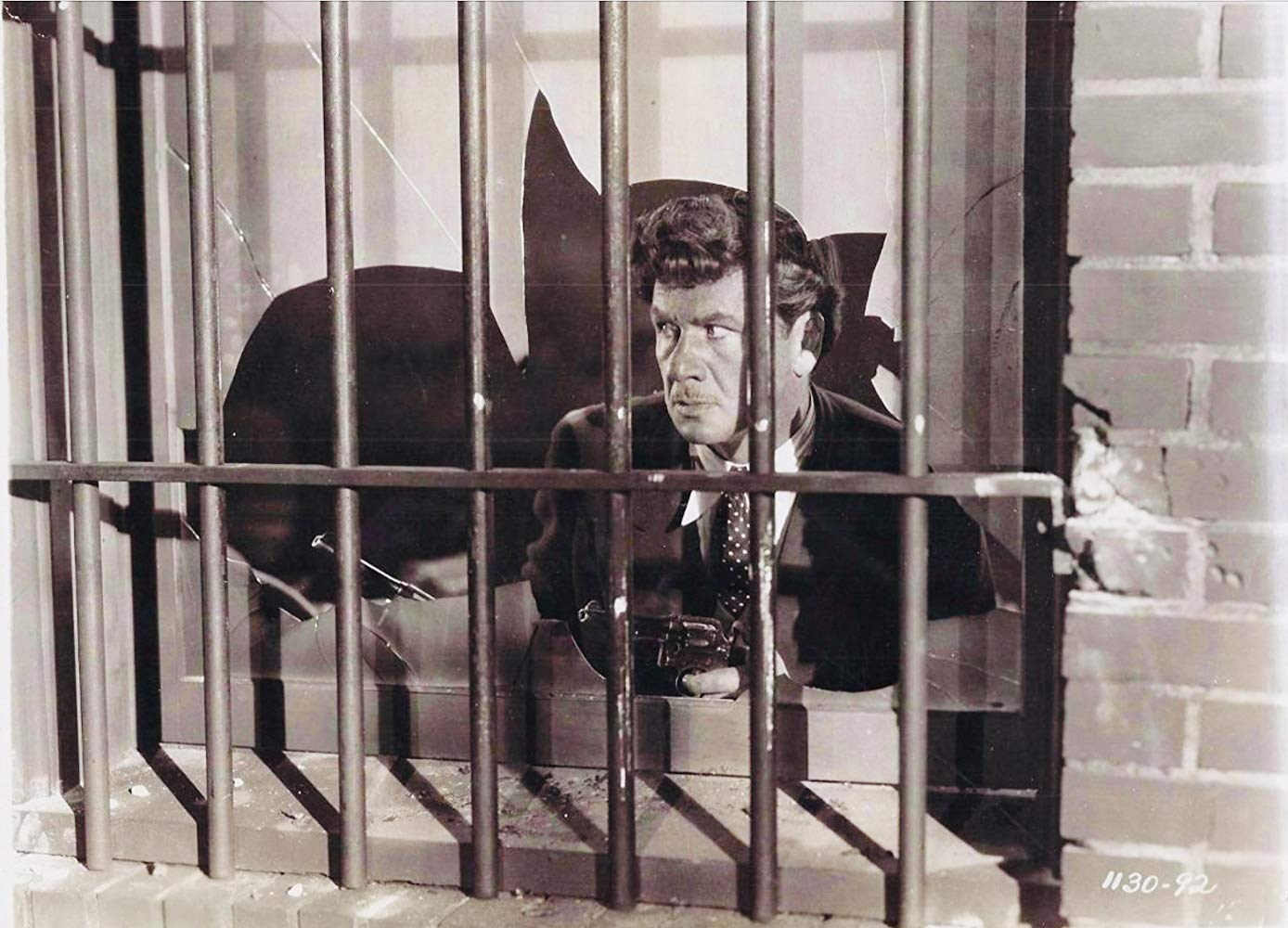
“Two-Gun” Nolan (George Bancroft)

== Reception ==
On June 4, 1928, The New York Times panned the film: "Notwithstanding George Bancroft's derisive laugh, Evelyn Brent's striking plumed headgear and Josef von Sternberg's generous display of slaughter, The Drag Net is an emphatically mediocre effort."

Critic John Baxter lists The Drag Net among a number of [Sternberg's] films which "failed commercially."

"In Sternberg's stylized world, crime is a projection of sexual potency. The women – Evelyn Brent in Underworld and The Drag Net, Fay Wray in Thunderbolt – are the ultimate prizes of criminal activity rather than mere fringe benefits, to which they are reduced in subsequent mobster sagas. As activators rather than accessories, Brent and Wray tend to feminize a brutish genre. Sternberg's underworld is a hellish cauldron of desire for dames smothered in furs and feathers"

— Film historian Andrew Sarris (1998)

== Critical response ==
Critic Andrew Sarris concedes that "the plot does sound extremely contrived" but cautions that "plots...are no clue to the merits of Sternberg's films, and until his long-missing film materializes, we must suspend judgment on a work that bridges The Last Command and The Docks of New York."

John Baxter considers The Drag Net to be "in most respects a sequel [to Sternberg's film] Underworld, [and] is perhaps not too great a loss, though it is unwise to write off any Sternberg film."

== Preservation ==
The Drag Net is now considered a lost film.

== Sources ==
- Baxter, John. 1971. The Cinema of Josef von Sternberg. The International Film Guide Series. A.S Barners & Company, New York.
- Sarris, Andrew. 1966. The Films of Josef von Sternberg. Museum of Modern Art/Doubleday. New York, New York.
- Sarris, Andrew. 1998. "You Ain't Heard Nothin' Yet." The American Talking Film History & Memory, 1927–1949. Oxford University Press. ISBN 0-19-513426-5
