= Lajos Bíró =

Hungarian novelist, playwright, and screenwriter (1880–1948)

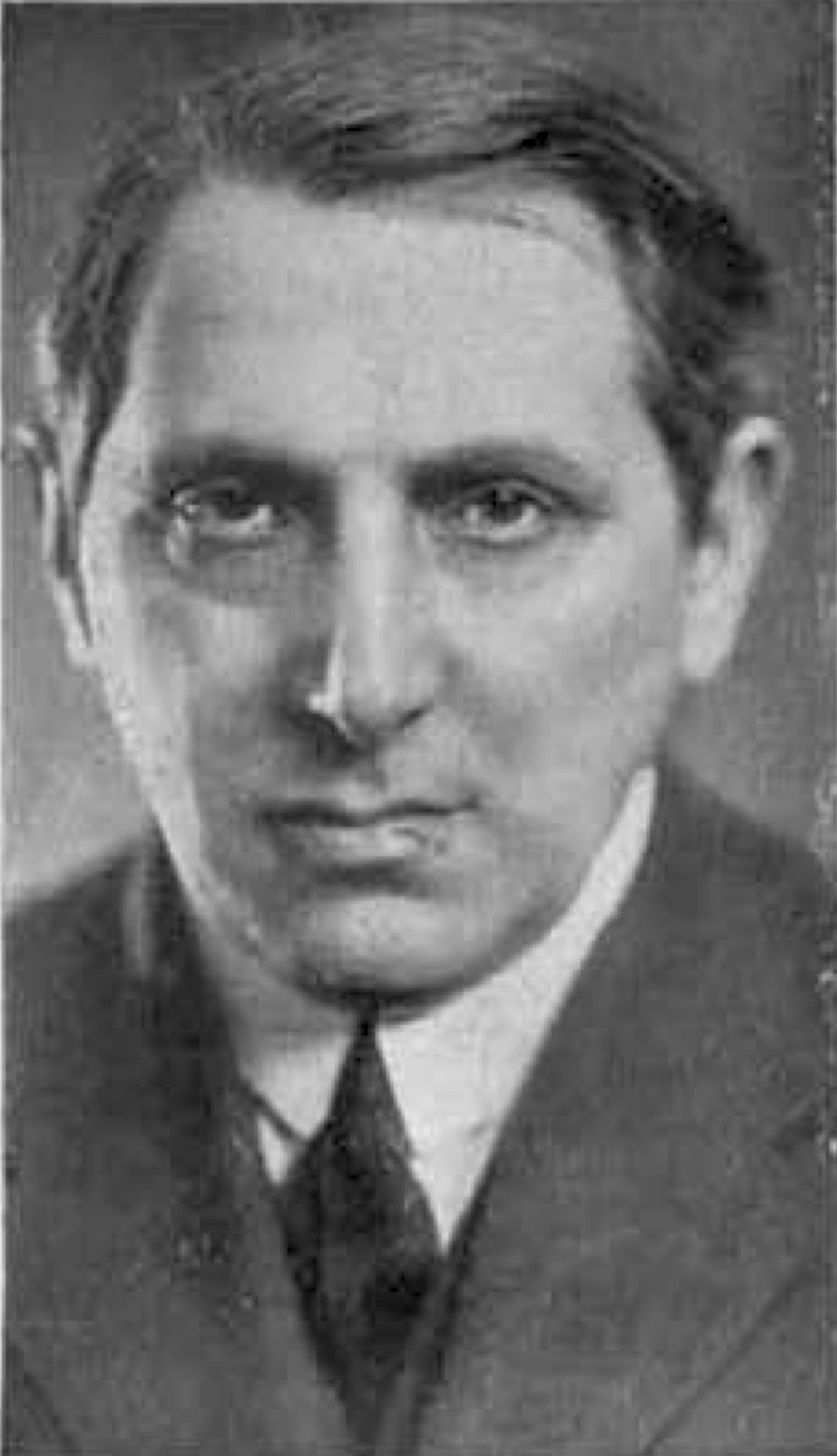
- Bíró c. 1931
- Born: Lajos Blau; 22 August 1880; Nagyvárad, Austria-Hungary (now Oradea, Romania)
- Died: 9 September 1948 (aged 68); London, UK
- Occupation: Writer
- Years active: 1917–1948
- Spouse: Jolán Vészi

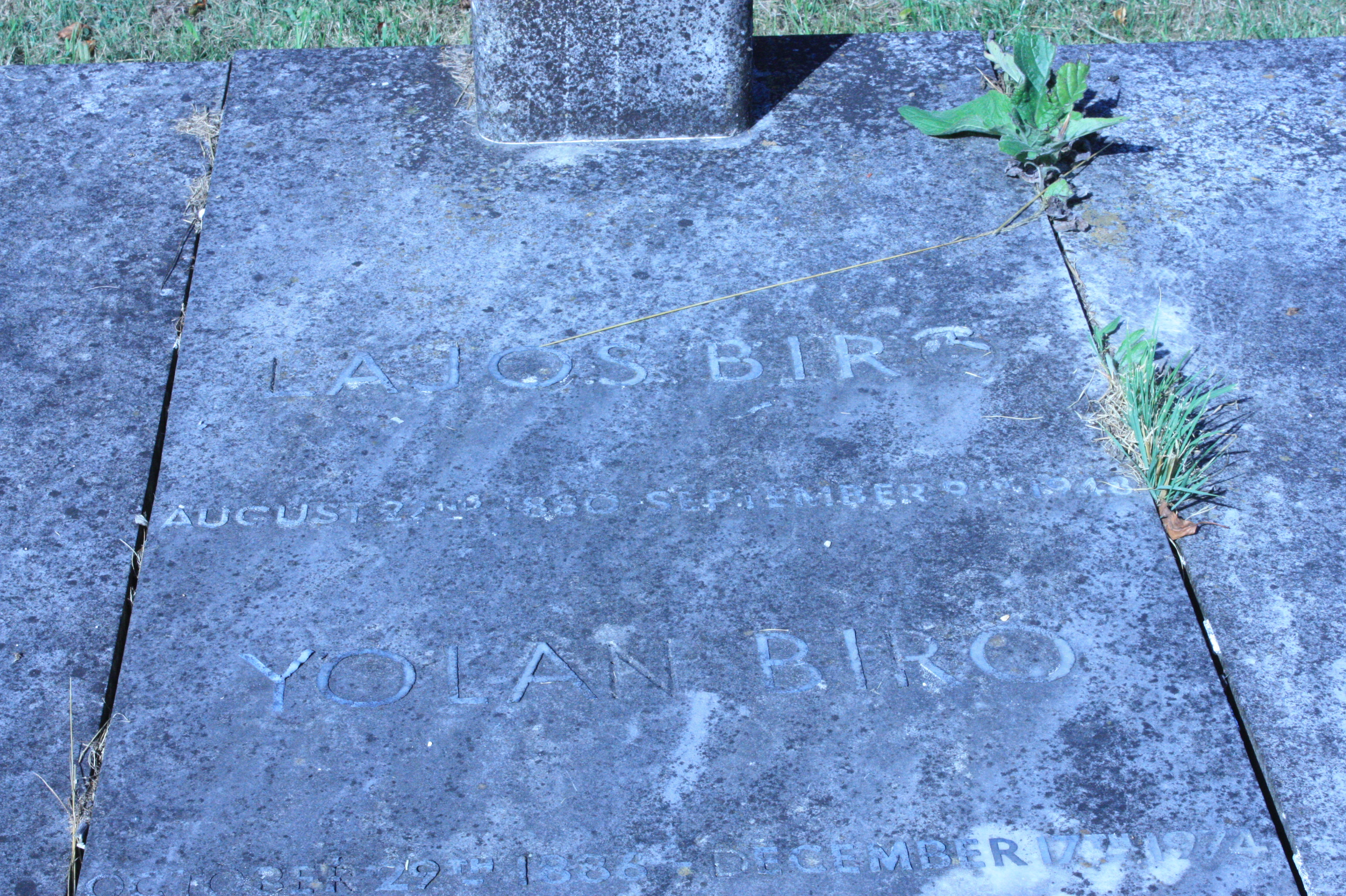
The grave of Lajos Bíró, Hampstead Cemetery, London

Lajos Bíró (IPA: [ˈlɒjoʒ ˈbiːroː]; (Note: In isolation, Lajos is pronounced [ˈlɒjoʃ].) born Lajos Blau;22 August 1880 – 9 September 1948) was a Hungarian novelist, playwright, and screenwriter who wrote many films from the early 1920s through the late 1940s.

== Life ==
He was born in Nagyvárad, Kingdom of Hungary (now Oradea, Romania) into Hungarian Jewish family. According to some sources he was born in Vienna. After high school, he worked as a newspaper writer in Paris, then in Oradea from 1900, and in Budapest from 1905. From 1904 he was deputy editor of the newspaper Pesti Napló. In March 1906 he married Jolan Veszi, daughter of József Vészi. From 1906 to 1909, he lived in Berlin. After that, he worked for The Newspaper and, from autumn 1913 for The World Newspaper. In 1914 he participated in the founding of the Civic Radical Party. He responded to the prolongation of World War I with sharply anti-militarist articles. The Károlyi government appointed him State Secretary for Foreign Affairs. He was a member of the writers' directory and president of the Writers' Union. After the fall of the Hungarian Soviet Republic in 1919, he was forced into emigration, initially living in Austria, France, and Germany. From 1925 to 1928, he resided in the United States, then in Berlin, and from 1932, in England. In United Kingdom he worked as a scenario chief for London Film Productions run by Alexander Korda, collaborating on many screenplays with Arthur Wimperis. He died in London on 9 September 1948 of a heart attack. He is buried in the northern section of Hampstead Cemetery in north London.

In 1929, he was nominated for an Academy Award for Best Original Writing for The Last Command, but lost to Ben Hecht for Underworld, the only other nomination in this category.

His beginning as a writer was influenced by naturalism. In his tense short stories, he illustrates the contradictions of contemporary bourgeois morality.

== Novels ==
- A Serpolette (The Serpolette, 1914)
- A bazini zsidók (The Jews of Bazin; 1921).

== Plays ==
- Szinmü négy felvon (Hotel Imperial) (1917)
- Gods and Kings, six one-act plays (English translation 1945)

== Partial filmography ==
- The Prince and the Pauper (1920)
- A Vanished World (1922)
- The House of Molitor (1922)
- Tragedy in the House of Habsburg (1924)
- Forbidden Paradise (1924) (play)
- Eve's Secret (1925)
- A Modern Dubarry (1927)
- The Heart Thief (1927)
- Hotel Imperial (1927) (play)
- The Way of All Flesh (1927)
- The Last Command (1928) (story)
- Yellow Lily (1928)
- Night Watch (1928)
- The Haunted House (1928)
- Women Everywhere (1930)
- Michael and Mary (1931)
- Service for Ladies (1932)
- The Golden Anchor (1932)
- The Faithful Heart (1932)
- Strange Evidence (1933)
- The Ghost Train (1933)
- The Private Life of Henry VIII (1933)
- Catherine the Great (1934) (play)
- The Private Life of Don Juan (1934)
- The Scarlet Pimpernel (1934)
- Sanders of the River (1935)
- The Ghost Goes West (1935)
- Rembrandt (1936)
- The Man Who Could Work Miracles (1936)
- Dark Journey (1937)
- Knight Without Armour (1937)
- The Divorce of Lady X (1938)
- The Drum (1938)
- Flower of the Tisza (1939)
- The Four Feathers (1939)
- The Thief of Bagdad (1940)
- Five Graves to Cairo (1943) (play)
- A Royal Scandal (1945) (play)
- An Ideal Husband (1947)
- Storm Over the Nile (1955)
