= The Showdown (1928 film) =

1928 film by Victor Schertzinger

- Directed by: Victor Schertzinger
- Written by: Ethel Doherty; Hope Loring; Houston Branch (play Wildcat)
- Starring: George Bancroft; Evelyn Brent; Neil Hamilton
- Cinematography: Victor Milner
- Edited by: George Nichols Jr.
- Distributed by: Paramount Pictures
- Release date: February 25, 1928
- Running time: 80 minutes
- Country: United States
- Language: Silent

The Showdown is a 1928 silent American drama film directed by Victor Schertzinger and starring George Bancroft, Evelyn Brent, and Neil Hamilton. The film is preserved at the Library of Congress. In 2013 the Library of Congress print was shown at Capitolfest at Rome, New York.

== Plot ==
A group of Westerners seek oil in Latin America, fighting over their claims and the local prostitute. When glamorous Sibyl (Brent) appears, "Lucky" Cardan (Bancroft) warns her that no woman can stay "decent" in "this country".

== Cast ==
- George Bancroft as "Lucky" Cardan
- Evelyn Brent as Sibyl Shelton
- Neil Hamilton as Wilson Shelton
- Fred Kohler as Winter
- Helen Lynch as Goldie
- Arnold Kent as Hugh Pickerell
- Leslie Fenton as Kilgore Shelton
- George Kuwa as Willie
