= A Daughter of the Law =

1921 film

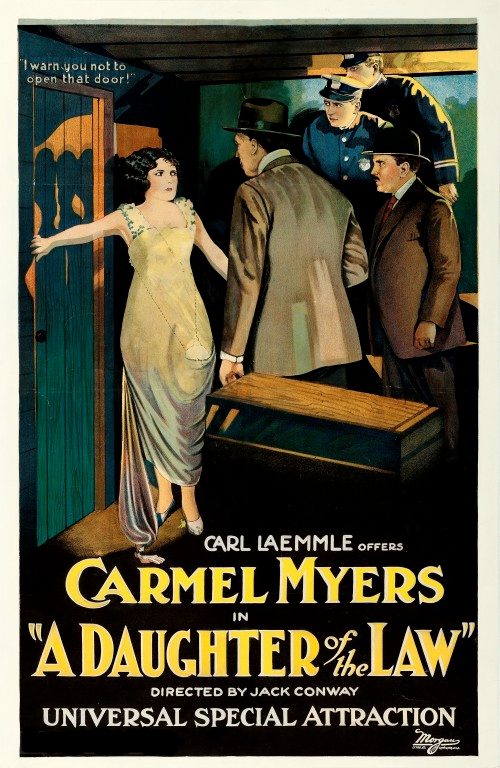
- Directed by: Jack Conway
- Written by: Wadsworth Camp (story); Harvey Gates
- Produced by: Carl Laemmle
- Starring: Carmel Myers; John B. O'Brien; Fred Kohler
- Cinematography: Bert Glennon
- Production company: Universal Pictures
- Distributed by: Universal Pictures
- Release date: July 15, 1921
- Running time: 50 minutes
- Country: United States
- Languages: Silent; English intertitles

A Daughter of the Law is a 1921 American silent crime film directed by Jack Conway and starring Carmel Myers, John B. O'Brien and Fred Kohler. An incomplete print of this film exists.

== Cast ==
- Carmel Myers as Nora Hayes
- John B. O'Brien as Jim Garth
- Fred Kohler as George Stacey
- Jack Walters as Slim Dolan
- Dick La Reno as Pata Marlowe
- Charles Arling as Insp. Hayes
- Joseph Bennett as Eddie Hayes

== Bibliography ==
- James Robert Parish & Michael R. Pitts. Film directors: a guide to their American films. Scarecrow Press, 1974.
