= The Wolf of Wall Street (1929 film) =

1929 film

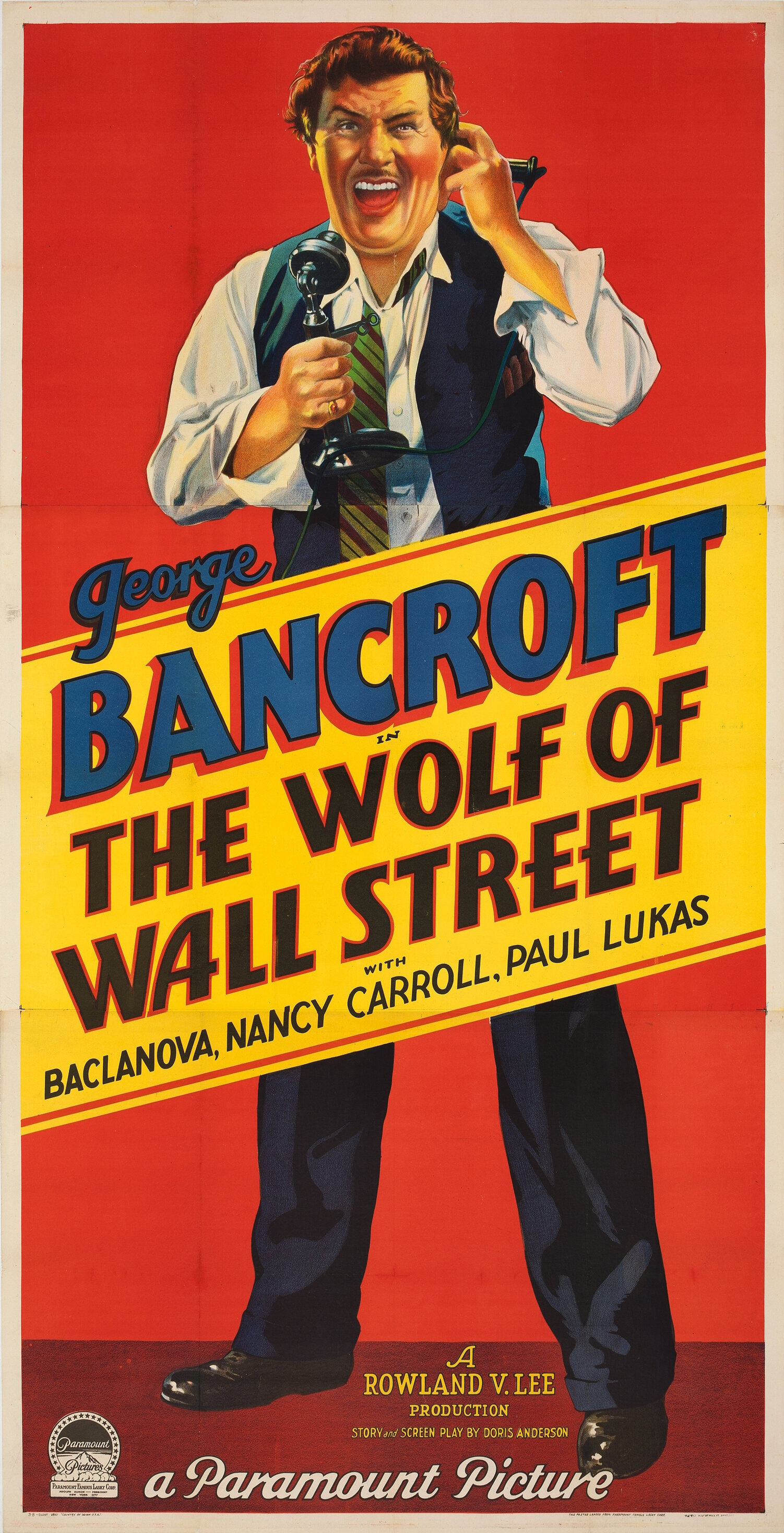
- Theatrical three-sheet release poster
- Directed by: Rowland V. Lee
- Written by: Doris Anderson
- Starring: George Bancroft; Olga Baclanova; Nancy Carroll
- Cinematography: Victor Milner
- Edited by: Robert Bassler
- Music by: Karl Hajos
- Production company: Paramount Pictures
- Distributed by: Paramount Pictures
- Release date: February 2, 1929 (United States)
- Running time: 90 minutes
- Country: United States
- Language: English

The Wolf of Wall Street is a lost 1929 American pre-Code drama film directed by Rowland V. Lee and starring George Bancroft, Paul Lukas, Olga Baclanova, and Nancy Carroll. The story and screenplay were written by Doris Anderson.

Originally made as a silent film, The Wolf of Wall Street was completely re-filmed with sound, becoming Bancroft's first talkie.

== Plot ==
A ruthless trader corners the market in copper and then sells short, making a fortune but ultimately ruining the finances of himself and his friends.

== Cast ==
- George Bancroft as The Wolf
- Olga Baclanova as Olga
- Nancy Carroll as Gert (the maid)
- Paul Lukas as David Tyler
- Brandon Hurst as Sturgess
- Crauford Kent as Jessup

== Music ==
The theme song for the film is entitled "Love Take My Heart" with music by Joseph Meyer and lyrics by Harold Christie. Olga Baclanova sings the song in the film. Olga Baclanova also sings "Gypsy Love Song" which was composed by the same team.

== Reception ==
Reception for the film was mixed. Life criticized the film for depending too much on its novelty value; the advertising ran "George Bancroft talks ... Baclanova sings", and Life noted "there is the good news that George Bancroft has a fine screen voice", but felt the film lacked substance in the plot. Film Daily wrote that "George Bancroft as the roughneck engineering a pool in Wall Street to get the sucker is immense, as usual", but complained of a lack of action and weak story.

== See also ==
- List of early sound feature films (1926–1929)
