= Fred Kohler =

American actor (1888–1938)

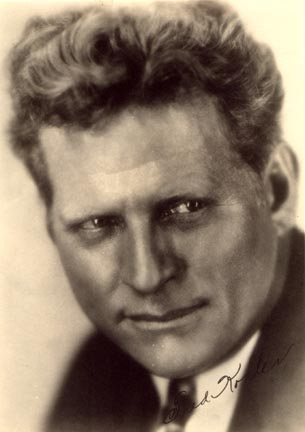
- Kohler in 1920
- Born: Fredrick Louis Kohler; April 20, 1888; Kansas City, Missouri, U.S.
- Died: October 28, 1938 (aged 50); Hollywood, California, U.S.
- Resting place: Inglewood Park Cemetery
- Occupation: Actor
- Years active: 1916–1939
- Spouses: Ida Friedman (m. 1910) Marguerite Schweikert (m. 1921) Constance Marjorie Prole (m. 1928)
- Children: Fred Kohler, Jr.

Fredrick Louis Kohler (April 20, 1888 – October 28, 1938) was an American actor.

== Career ==
Fred Kohler was born in Kansas City, Missouri or in Dubuque, Iowa. As a teen, he began to pursue a career in vaudeville, but worked other jobs to support himself. He lost part of his right hand in a mining accident during this time. Eventually he was able to join a touring company, and worked steadily in show business for several years. His son Fred Kohler Jr. also became an actor.

America's budding film industry drew a 20-something Kohler to Hollywood, where he made his start in silent films. His first role was in the 1911 short The Code of Honor, and he had an uncredited role in Cecil B. DeMille's feature film Joan the Woman (1917), but a steady stream of parts did not begin until The Tiger's Trail (1919).

Kohler's stern features earned him a niche playing villains. His role as Bauman in The Iron Horse (1924) is a notable example. With the advent of the talkies, Kohler reprised many of his silent roles in remakes with sound, particularly in Westerns based on novels by Zane Grey.

At the beginning of the sound era, he appeared in the Allan Dwan film Tide of Empire (1929) alongside Renée Adorée and Tom Keene.

== Personal life and death ==
Kohler was married three times. In 1910 he married Ida Friedman; their son Fred Kohler, Jr., birthname Jesse William Koehler, was born September 4, 1911. In 1921 he was married to actress Marguerite Schweikert. In 1928 he was married to French actress Constance Marjorie Prole. He died of a heart attack on October 28, 1938, at age 50. He was buried in an unmarked grave at Inglewood Park Cemetery in South Los Angeles community of Inglewood, California.

== Selected filmography ==
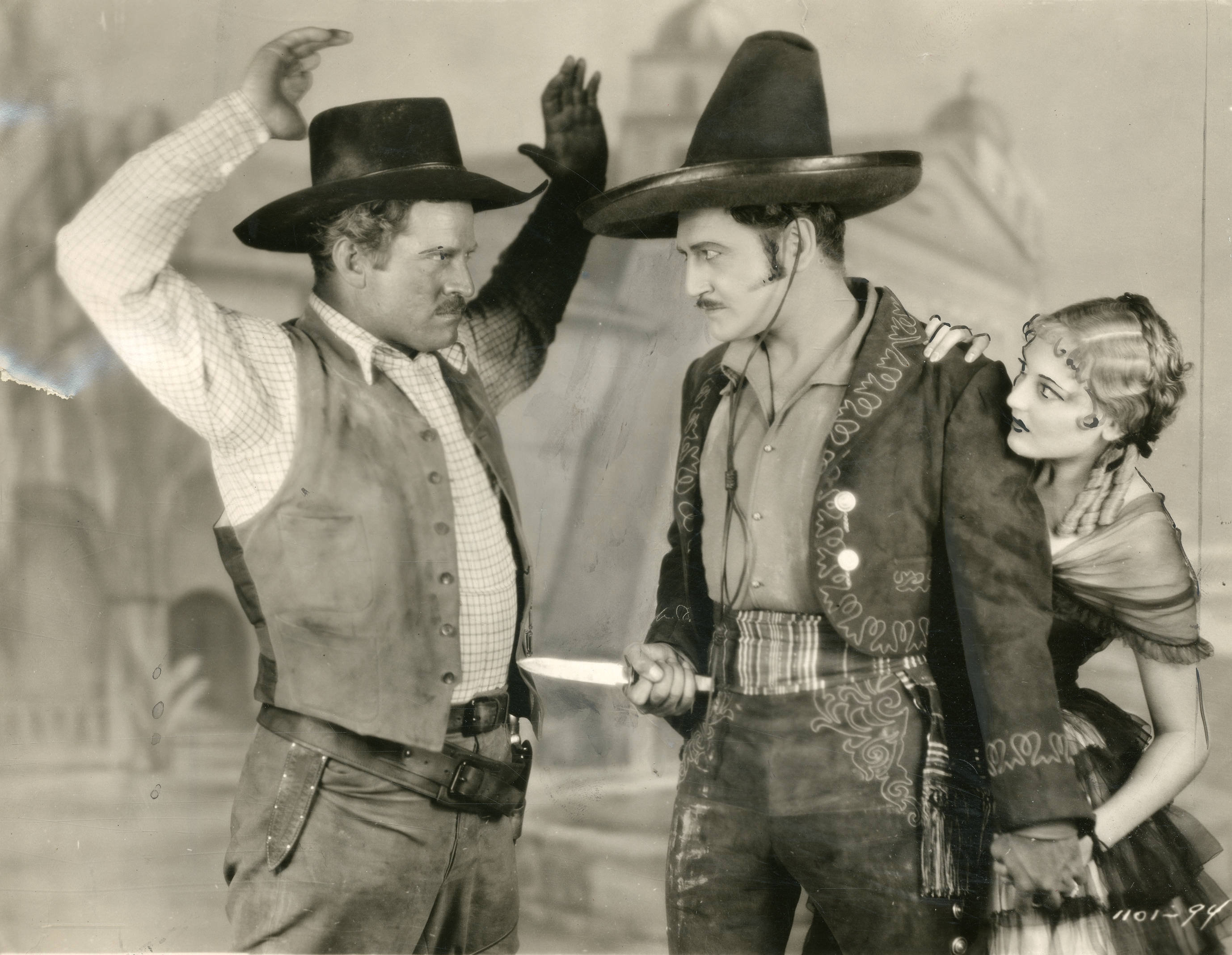
Still from The Gay Defender (1927). From the left, Kohler, Richard Dix, Thelma Todd. Kohler's damaged right hand is visible.

- Joan the Woman (1916) - L'Oiseleur's henchman (uncredited)
- The Tiger's Trail (1919) - 'Bull' Shotwell
- Soldiers of Fortune (1919) - McWilliams
- Behind the Door (1919) - Minor Role (uncredited)
- Polly of the Storm Country (1920)
- The Kentucky Colonel (1920) - Jim Britsides
- A Thousand to One (1920) - Donnelly
- Cyclone Bliss (1921) - Jack Hall
- Partners of the Tide (1921) - First Mate
- Thunder Island (1921) - Barney the Mate
- Conflict (1921) - Jevons' foreman (uncredited)
- The Stampede (1921) - Steve Norton
- A Daughter of the Law (1921) - George Stacey
- With Stanley in Africa (1922)
- The Scrapper (1922) - Oleson
- The Milky Way (1922)
- Yellow Men and Gold (1922) - Craven
- His Back Against the Wall (1922) - Arizona Pete
- The Son of the Wolf (1922) - Malemute Kid
- Trimmed (1922) - Young Bill Young
- Perils of the Yukon (1922) - Capt. Whipple
- Without Compromise (1922) - Cass Blake
- Three Who Paid (1923) - Jim Quade
- The Flame of Life (1923) - Spring
- Thru the Flames (1923) - 'Red' Burke
- The Eleventh Hour (1923) - Barbara's Uncle
- Shadows of the North (1923) - Ray Brent
- Hell's Hole (1923) - Prisoner
- North of Hudson Bay (1923) - Armand LeMoir
- Anna Christie (1923) - Minor Role (uncredited)
- The Red Warning (1923) - Tom Jeffries
- The Dramatic Life of Abraham Lincoln (1924) - Slave Auctioneer
- Fighting Fury (1924) - 'Two-finger' Larkin
- The Iron Horse (1924) - Deroux
- Dick Turpin (1925) - Ring Announcer (uncredited)
- The Thundering Herd (1925) - Follansbee
- Riders of the Purple Sage (1925) - Henchman Tom Metzger (uncredited)
- Winds of Chance (1925) - Joe McCaskey
- The Prairie Pirate (1925) - Aguilar - the Bandit
- Danger Quest (1926) - Otto Shugars
- The Bar-C Mystery (1926)
- The Ice Flood (1926) - 'Cougar' Kid
- The Country Beyond (1926) - Joe Leseur
- Old Ironsides (1926) - Second Mate (uncredited)
- The Devil's Masterpiece (1927) - Reckless Jim Regan
- The Way of All Flesh (1927) - The Tough
- The Blood Ship (1927) - First Mate Fitz
- Underworld (1927) - 'Buck' Mulligan
- The Loves of Carmen (1927) - Gypsy Chief
- The Rough Riders (1927) - Sergeant Stanton
- Shootin' Irons (1927) - Dick Hardman
- Open Range (1927) - Sam Hardman
- The City Gone Wild (1927) - Gunner Gallagher
- The Gay Defender (1927) - Jake Hamby
- The Showdown (1928) - Winter
- Chinatown Charlie (1928) - Monk
- The Dragnet (1928) - 'Gabby' Steve
- The Vanishing Pioneer (1928) - Sheriff Murdock
- Forgotten Faces (1928) - Spider (Convict Number 1309)
- Sal of Singapore (1928) - Captain Sunday
- The Spieler (1928) - Red Moon
- The Case of Lena Smith (1929) - Stefan
- The Leatherneck (1929) - Heckla
- The Dummy (1929) - Joe Cooper
- Tide of Empire (1929) - Cannon
- The Quitter (1929) - Duffy Thompson
- Stairs of Sand (1929) - Boss Stone
- Thunderbolt (1929) - 'Bad Al' Frieberg
- River of Romance (1929) - Captain Blackie
- Broadway Babies (1929) - Perc Gessant
- Say It with Songs (1929) - Fred, Joe's Cellmate
- Hell's Heroes (1929) - Wild Bill Kearney
- Roadhouse Nights (1930) - Sam Horner
- Under a Texas Moon (1930) - Bad Man
- The Light of Western Stars (1930) - H.W. Stack
- A Soldier's Plaything (1930) - Hank
- The Lash (1930) - Peter Harkness
- Other Men's Women (1931) - Haley
- Fighting Caravans (1931) - Lee Murdock
- The Right of Way (1931) - Joseph Portugais
- Woman Hungry (1931) - Kampen
- Corsair (1931) - Big John
- X Marks the Spot (1931) - Edward P. Riggs
- Carnival Boat (1932) - Hack Logan
- The Rider of Death Valley (1932) - Lew Grant
- The Texas Bad Man (1932) - Gore Hampton
- The Fourth Horseman (1932) - Honest Ben Jones
- Call Her Savage (1932) - Silas Jennings
- Wild Horse Mesa (1932) - Rand
- The Constant Woman (1933) - Speakeasy Bouncer
- Under the Tonto Rim (1933) - Munther
- The Fiddlin' Buckaroo (1933) - Wolf Morgan
- Deluge (1933) - Jepson
- Ship of Wanted Men (1933) - Chuck Young
- The Wolf Dog (1933) - Joe Stevens
- Queen Christina (1933) - Member of Court (uncredited)
- Honor of the Range (1934) - Rawhide
- The Last Round-Up (1934) - Sam Gulden
- Half a Sinner (1934) - Brick
- Little Man, What Now? (1934) - Karl Goebbler
- The Man from Hell (1934) - Mayor Anse McCloud
- West of the Pecos (1934) - Sawtelle
- Horses' Collars (1935, Short) - Double Deal Decker
- Times Square Lady (1935) - 'Dutch' Meyers
- Wilderness Mail (1935) - Lobo McBain - a.k.a. Landau
- Mississippi (1935) - Captain Blackie
- Goin' to Town (1935) - Buck Gonzales
- Border Brigands (1935) - Captain Conyda
- Hard Rock Harrigan (1935) - Black Jack Riley
- Men of Action (1935) - Thorenson
- Lightning Triggers (1935) - Bull Thompson
- Trails End (1935) - Wild Bill Holman
- Stormy (1935) - Deem Dorn
- Frisco Kid (1935) - Shanghai Duck
- Dangerous Intrigue (1936) - Brant
- It's Up to You (1936) - Torchy
- Heart of the West (1936) - Barton
- For the Service (1936) - Bruce Howard
- The Texas Rangers (1936) - Jess Higgins
- The Vigilantes Are Coming (1936, Serial) - General Jason Burr
- The Plainsman (1936) - Jake - A Teamster
- The Accusing Finger (1936) - Johnson
- Arizona Mahoney (1936) - Gil Blair
- Daughter of Shanghai (1937) - Captain Gulner
- The Buccaneer (1938) - Gramby
- Forbidden Valley (1938) - Matt Rogan
- Gangs of New York (1938) - Krueger
- Blockade (1938) - Pietro
- Painted Desert (1938) - Hugh Fawcett
- Billy the Kid Returns (1938) - Matson
- Lawless Valley (1938) - Tom Marsh
- Boy Slaves (1939) - Drift Boss (uncredited) (final film role)
