= Talk of the Devil =

- Directed by: Carol Reed
- Written by: George Barraud; Anthony Kimmins; Carol Reed
- Produced by: Jack Raymond
- Starring: Ricardo Cortez; Sally Eilers; Basil Sydney
- Cinematography: Francis Carver
- Edited by: Helen Lewis; John E. Morris; Merrill G. White
- Music by: Percival Mackey
- Production company: British and Dominions
- Distributed by: United Artists
- Release date: 9 December 1936
- Running time: 76 minutes
- Country: United Kingdom
- Language: English

Talk of the Devil is a 1936 British crime film directed by Carol Reed and starring Ricardo Cortez, Sally Eilers and Basil Sydney. It was written by George Barraud, Anthony Kimmins and Reed.

It remains one of Reed's most obscure films and was for many years out of circulation, although the BFI National Archive holds a copy. The film was poorly received in its time and did little to boost Reed's standing in the British film industry.

== Premise ==
A dishonest shipbuilder plans to frame his half-brother for his own criminal activities.

== Cast ==
- Ricardo Cortez as Ray Allen
- Sally Eilers as Ann Marlow
- Basil Sydney as Stephen Rindlay
- Randle Ayrton as John Findlay
- Charles Carson as Lord Dymchurch
- Frederick Culley as Mr Alderson
- Anthony Holles as Colquhoun
- Gordon McLeod as Inspector
- Denis Cowles as Philip Couls
- Quentin McPhearson as Angus
- Langley Howard as clerk
- Margaret Rutherford as housekeeper
- Moore Marriott as dart-thrower

== Production ==
Reed had previously been working for Ealing Studios, but he made the film for the independent producer Herbert Wilcox. It was the first film to be completely made at the recently opened Pinewood Studios. The film's sets were designed by the art director Wilfred Arnold.

== Reception ==
The Monthly Film Bulletin wrote: "The plot takes some swallowing, but it has originality and contains some excellent situations which are well handled by the director. Casting and acting are good, and the dialogue is natural and realistic."

Kine Weekly wrote: "Here we have a thick-ear melodrama of high quality, in which an arresting portrait of villainy is draped with all the popular essentials. The actual premise of the plot is, of course, somewhat extravagant, but it has imaginative ingenuity on its side, and this is interpreted in terms of first-rate mass entertainment. The character-drawing is good, the staging excellent, and the direction slick, tense and efficient. Furthermore, the picture has a disarming sense of good humour."
