= József Vészi =

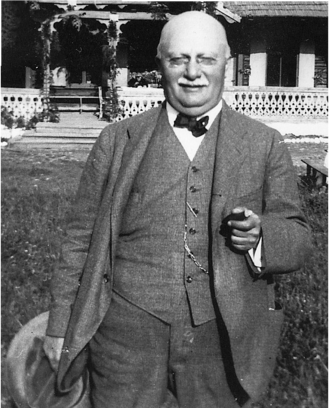

József Vészi, (born: Joseph Weiss; November 6, 1858, Arad – January 23, 1940, Budapest) was a Hungarian writer, journalist, poet, translator, editor and deputy; born at Arad 6 November 1858, died 1940. He was educated at the gymnasium of his native town, and studied philosophy, literature, and languages at Budapest. In his early youth he was a poet, and in the 1870s his lyrical productions were accepted by the best literary periodicals, while two volumes of his verses were published at Budapest in 1880 under the titles A Bánat Dalaiból and Traviata, Dalok Egy Tévedt Nőhöz. Since 1877 he devoted himself to journalism, advocating liberal views. He was for some time editor of the Budapester Tagblatt, and contributed leaders and stories to the Pester Lloyd. In 1894, he became editor-in-chief of the Pesti Napló, and in 1896 he founded the Budapesti Napló.

Vészi was president of the journalistic club of Budapest, and vice-president of the picture salon and of the club of amateur musicians in that city. He was also master of the masonic lodge "Reform." In 1899, he was elected to the Hungarian Parliament from the district of Szászsebes (Sebeş); and in 1901, from the third district of the capital. He took an active interest in all Jewish affairs.

The most enduring feat of his career, however, was his discovery of new talent. He brought the poet Endre Ady to Budapest and secured both a livelihood and the possibility of publication for him; it was to Vészi’s daughter, Margit — later the wife of Ferenc Molnár — that Ady wrote the poem cycle Margita élni akar (Margitta Wants to Live; 1912); Vészi’s other daughter was married to the writer Lajos Bíró. Details of the autobiography of his granddaughter, Márta Molnár (poet György Sárközi’s wife), paint a lively picture of the colorful bourgeois Jewish salons in Budapest.
