= Hotel Imperial (1927 film) =

1927 American silent war film

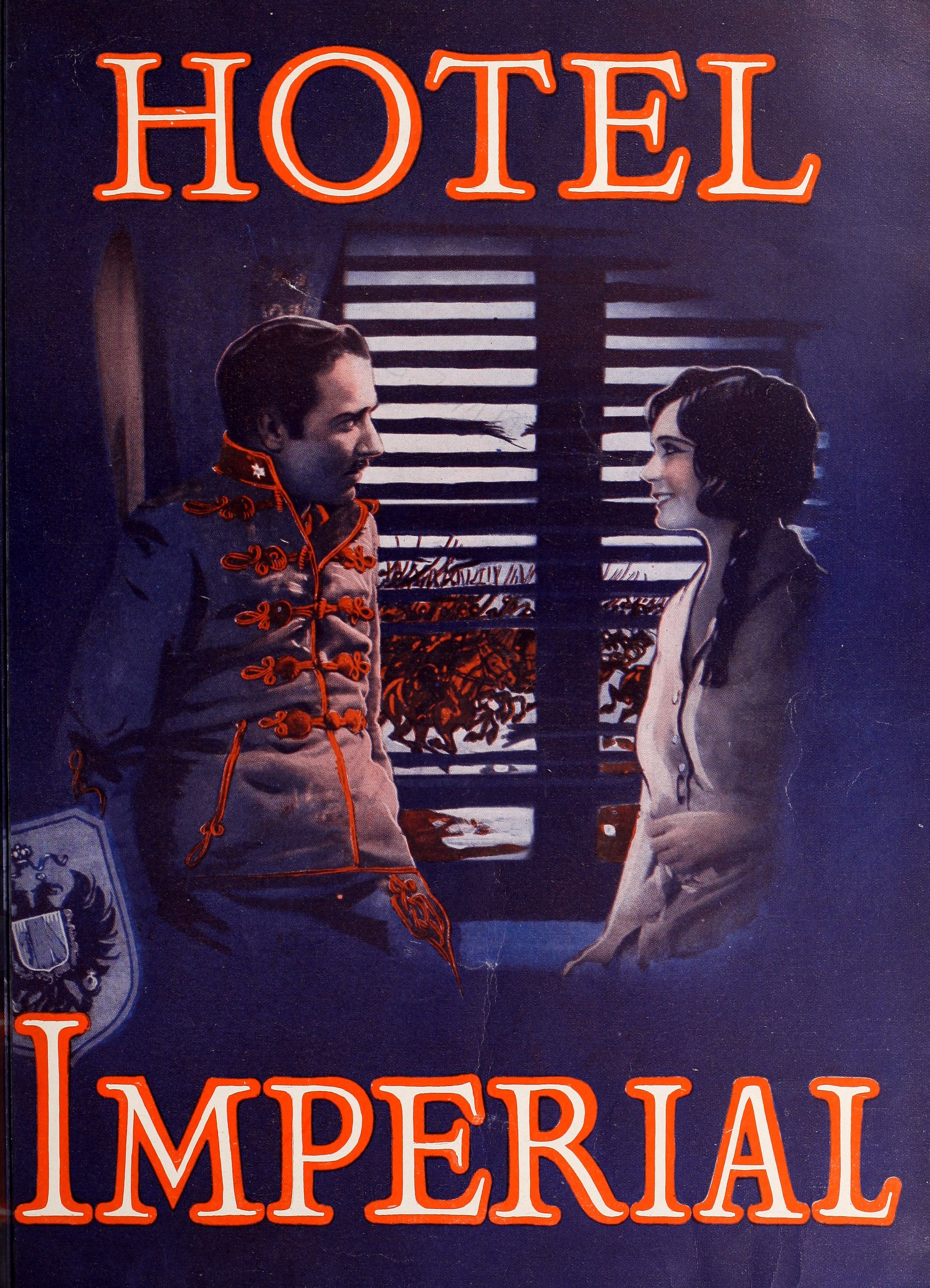
- Advertisement
- Directed by: Mauritz Stiller
- Written by: Jules Furthman
- Based on: Szinmü négy felvon (Hotel Imperial) by Lajos Bíró
- Produced by: Erich Pommer
- Starring: Pola Negri; James Hall
- Cinematography: Bert Glennon
- Edited by: E. Lloyd Sheldon
- Production company: Famous Players–Lasky
- Distributed by: Paramount Pictures
- Release date: January 1, 1927
- Running time: 85 minutes
- Country: United States
- Language: Silent (English intertitles)

Hotel Imperial is a 1927 American silent war drama film directed by Mauritz Stiller and released by Paramount Pictures. The film is set in Austria-Hungary during World War I and starring Pola Negri as a hotel chambermaid. It is based on the 1917 Hungarian play of the same name by Lajos Bíró.

== Plot ==
Officer Paul Almasy is separated from his unit behind enemy lines and hides in the Hotel Imperial in Lemberg (nowadays Lviv, Ukraine), where chambermaid Anna disguises him as a waiter. The invading Russian troops make the hotel their headquarters. Paul later kills the Russian spy Petroff and Anna arranges the room to depict the death as being a suicide. Later, when the Russians accuse Paul of the killing, Anna provides an alibi by saying that Paul was instead with her in her room and while so doing rips the fine clothing that General Juschkiewitsch has provided her. She later helps Paul elude the Russians and leave the hotel so that he can rejoin his unit. After Austrian troops regain the city, the lovers are reunited and their bravery is recognized.

== Cast ==
- Pola Negri as Anna Sedlak
- James Hall as Lieutenant Paul Almasy
- George Siegmann as General Juschkiewitsch
- Max Davidson as Elias Butterman
- Michael Vavitch as Tabakowitsch
- Otto Fries as Anton Klinak
- Nicholas Soussanin as Baron Fredrikson
- Golden Wadhams as Major General Sultanov
- George Berrell as Old Man with White Hair
- Josef Swickard as Austrian General (uncredited)
- Carl von Haartman as Russian Soldier (uncredited)

== Production ==
The film used the same exterior town square set from Negri's film The Spanish Dancer (1923).

== Commentary ==
In a departure from her former vampish roles, Negri depicted Anna as tense and fidgeting, experiencing the anxiety of wartime non-combatants. As a woman surrounded by foreign soldiers in the hotel, she watches carefully and, when she sees the need, takes decisive action to avoid sexual assault and save her lover and, indirectly, her nation.

== Preservation ==
Hotel Imperial is one of Negri's few Paramount films to survive and is preserved in several film archives.
