= Bert Glennon =

American film director (1893–1967)

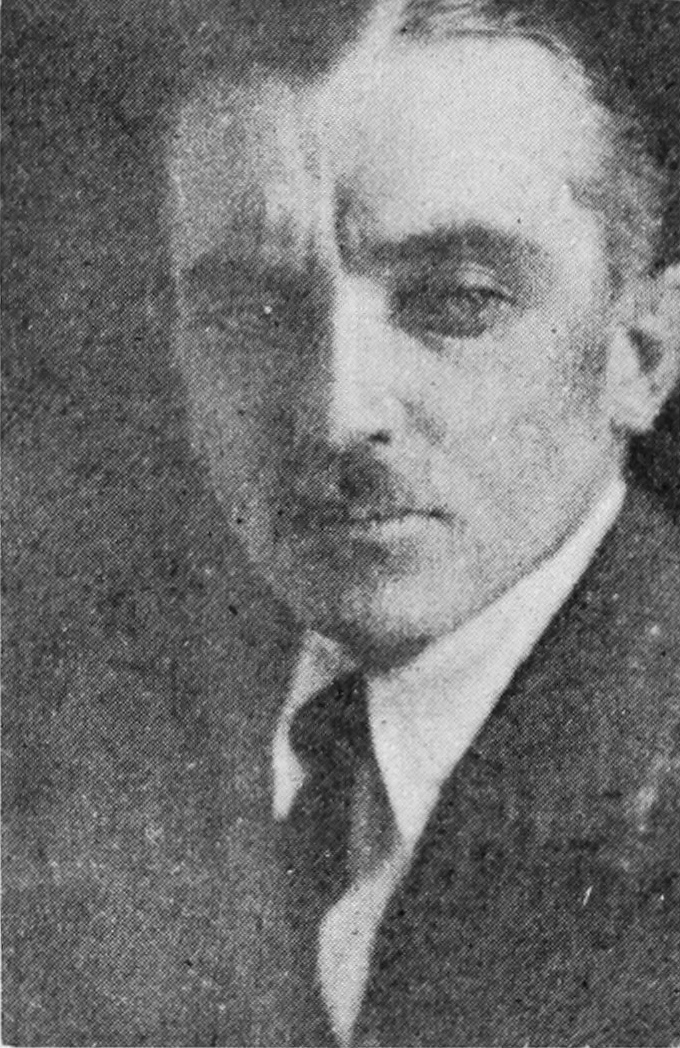
- Glennon in 1925
- Born: Bert Lawrence Glennon; November 19, 1895; Anaconda, Montana, U.S.
- Died: June 29, 1967 (aged 71)
- Education: Stanford University
- Occupations: Cinematographer, film director
- Children: James Glennon

Bert Lawrence Glennon (November 19, 1895 – June 29, 1967) was an American cinematographer and film director. He directed Syncopation (1929), the first film released by RKO Radio Pictures.

== Biography ==
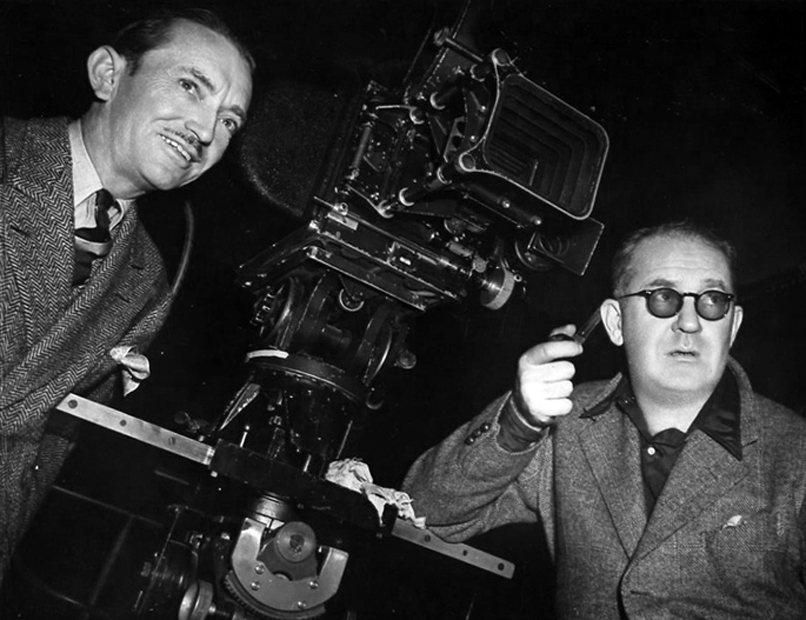
Bert Glennon and director John Ford on the set of Stagecoach (1939)

Glennon was born in Anaconda, Montana in 1895 and attended Stanford University, where he graduated in 1912. Before gaining fame in Hollywood, Glennon served as a pursuit pilot instructor during World War I. He began his work in film in 1912 as a stage manager for theater entrepreneur Oliver Morosco and then c. 1913 worked for Keystone and Famous Players, then was laboratory superintendent for Clune Film Corporation, for four years. In 1915 he did his first film as cinematographer The Stingaree (serial) and in 1928 he directed his first film The Perfect Crime.

Glennon was nominated for two Academy Awards in Best Cinematography for the films Stagecoach (1939) and Dive Bomber (1941). He worked as a cinematographer on over 100 films for directors that included John Ford, André de Toth, Josef von Sternberg, Raoul Walsh, and Cecil B. DeMille. His son James Glennon was also an Academy Award-nominated cinematographer.

== Partial filmography ==
=== As cinematographer ===
- Ramona (1916)
- The Kentucky Colonel (1920)
- A Daughter of the Law (1921)
- Cheated Love (1921)
- The Dangerous Moment (1921)
- The Torrent (1921)
- Moonlight Follies (1921)
- Nobody's Fool (1921)
- The Kiss (1921)
- Ebb Tide (1922)
- Java Head (1923)
- The Ten Commandments (1923)
- Triumph (1924)
- Changing Husbands (1924)
- Open All Night (1924)
- Are Parents People? (1925)
- Wild Horse Mesa (1925)
- Flower of Night (1925)
- A Woman of the World (1925)
- The Crown of Lies (1926)
- Good and Naughty (1926)
- Hotel Imperial (1927)
- Barbed Wire (1927)
- Underworld (1927)
- The Woman on Trial (1927)
- The City Gone Wild (1927)
- The Last Command (1928)
- Street of Sin (1928)
- The Patriot (1928)
- Blonde Venus (1932)
- Christopher Strong (1933)
- Gabriel Over the White House (1933)
- Morning Glory (1933)
- Alice in Wonderland (1933)
- The Scarlet Empress (1934)
- Grand Canary (1934)
- The Prisoner of Shark Island (1936)
- Dimples (1936)
- Lloyd's of London (1936)
- The Prisoner of Zenda (1937) (uncredited)
- The Hurricane (1937)
- Stagecoach (1939)
- Young Mr. Lincoln (1939)
- Drums Along the Mohawk (1939)
- Swanee River (1939)
- Our Town (1940)
- The Howards of Virginia (1940)
- One Night in Lisbon (1941)
- Dive Bomber (1941)
- They Died with Their Boots On (1941)
- Mission to Moscow (1943)
- Desperate Journey (1942)
- This Is the Army (1943)
- Destination Tokyo (1943)
- The Desert Song (1943)
- The Very Thought of You (1944)
- Hollywood Canteen (1944)
- San Antonio (1945)
- Shadow of a Woman (1946)
- Mr. District Attorney (1947)
- The Red House (1947)
- Copacabana (1947)
- Ruthless (1948)
- Red Light (1949)
- Wagon Master (1950)
- Rio Grande (1950)
- Operation Pacific (1951)
- The Big Trees (1952)
- About Face (1952)
- House of Wax (1953)
- The Moonlighter (1953)
- Thunder Over the Plains (1953)
- Crime Wave (1954)
- Riding Shotgun (1954)
- The Mad Magician (1954)
- Sergeant Rutledge (1960)
- Lad: A Dog (1962)

=== As director ===
- Gang War (1928)
- The Perfect Crime (1928)
- The Air Legion (1929)
- Syncopation (1929)
- Girl of the Port (1930)
- Around the Corner (1930)
- Paradise Island (1930)
- In Line of Duty (1931)
- South of Santa Fe (1932)

=== As screenwriter ===
- Second Wife (1930)

=== As actor ===
- The Patchwork Girl of Oz (1914) (as Herbert Glennon)
