= The Street of Sin =

1928 film

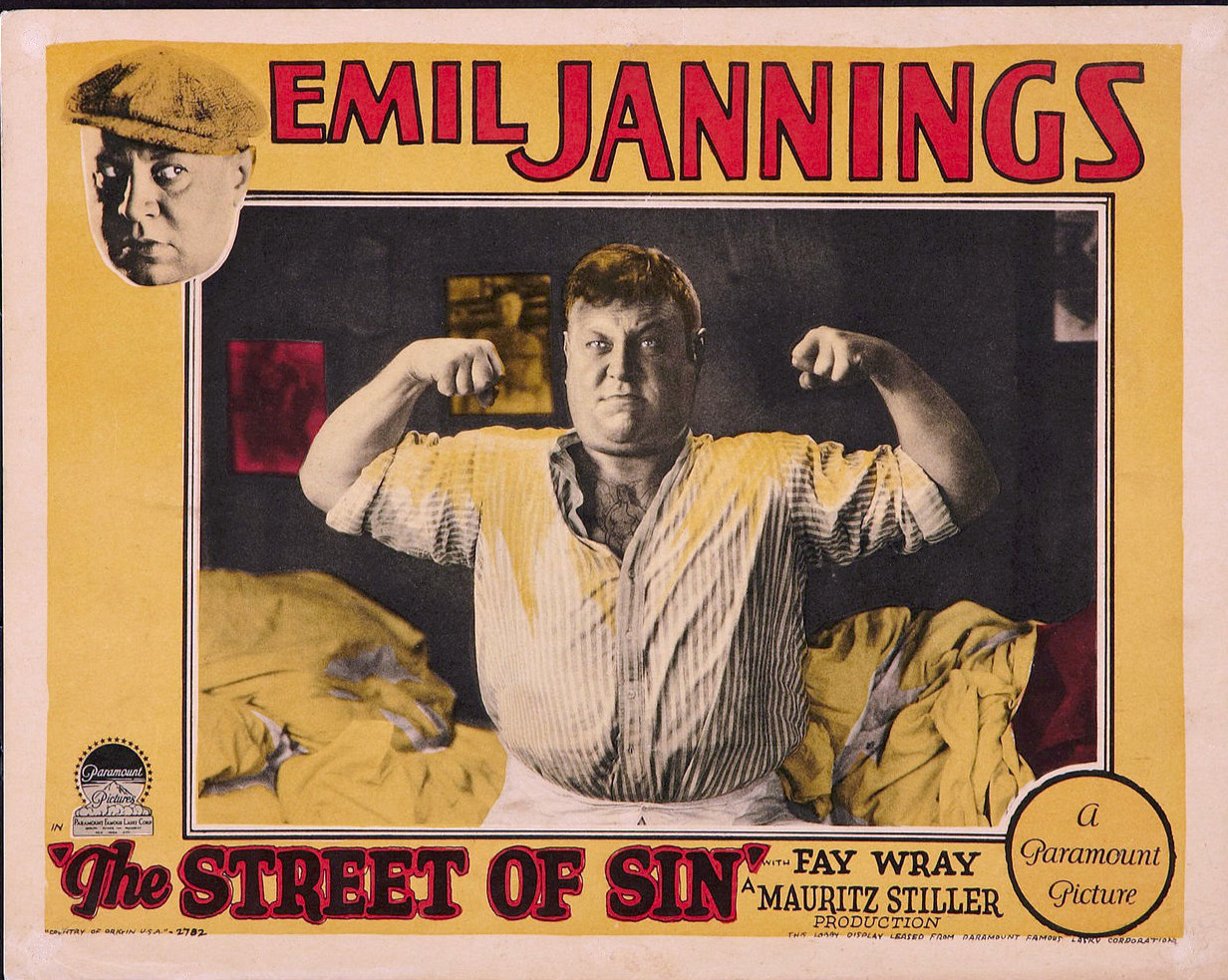
- Lobby card
- Directed by: Mauritz Stiller; Ludwig Berger (uncredited); Lothar Mendes (uncredited)
- Written by: Chandler Sprague (scenario); Julian Johnson (intertitles)
- Story by: Benjamin Glazer; Josef von Sternberg
- Produced by: Adolph Zukor; Jesse Lasky; B. P. Schulberg; Benjamin Glazer
- Starring: Olga Baclanova; Emil Jannings; Fay Wray
- Cinematography: Bert Glennon; Harry Fischbeck; Victor Milner
- Edited by: George Nichols Jr.
- Distributed by: Paramount Pictures
- Release date: May 26, 1928
- Running time: 7 reels; 6,218 feet
- Country: United States
- Language: Silent (English intertitles)

The Street of Sin is a 1928 American silent drama film directed by Mauritz Stiller. It starred Emil Jannings, Fay Wray, and Olga Baclanova. It was distributed by Paramount Pictures.

== Cast ==
- Olga Baclanova as Annie
- Emil Jannings as "Basher" Bill
- Fay Wray as Elizabeth
- Ernest W. Johnson as Mr. Smith
- George Kotsonaros as Iron Mike
- John Gough as Crony of Basher Bill
- Johnnie Morris as Crony of Basher Bill
- John Burdette as Publican

== Production ==
This was the final film directed by Stiller; he returned to Sweden in November 1927 and died from pleurisy in 1928. The film was completed by Ludwig Berger. Although initially scheduled for release in early 1928, it was delayed to allow the reshooting of some scenes at the finish of the film.

== Preservation ==
With no prints of The Street of Sin located in any film archives, it is a lost film.

== See also ==
- List of lost films
