= George Bancroft (actor) =

American actor (1882–1956)

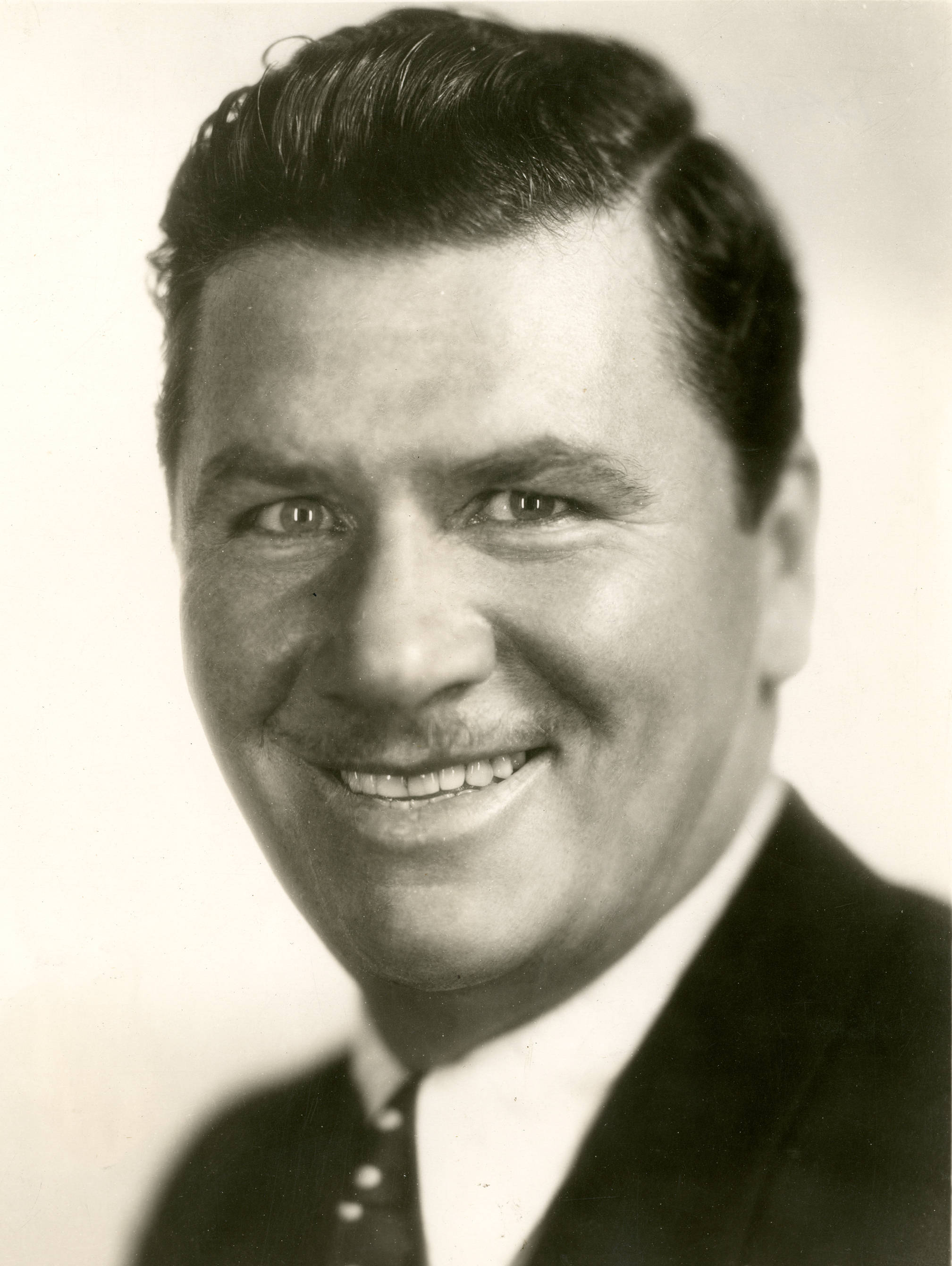
- Bancroft in 1930
- Born: September 30, 1882; Philadelphia, Pennsylvania, U.S.
- Died: October 2, 1956 (aged 74); Santa Monica, California, U.S.
- Education: United States Naval Academy
- Occupation: Actor
- Years active: 1925–1942

George Bancroft (September 30, 1882 – October 2, 1956) was an American film actor, whose career spanned seventeen years from 1925 to 1942. A star of pre-Code Hollywood, he is best known as the tough guy lead in four Josef von Sternberg films, the last of which, Thunderbolt, earned him a nomination for an Academy Award for Best Actor. He was later a supporting player in a number of notable movies, including Mr. Deeds Goes to Town (1936) and Stagecoach (1939).

== Early years ==
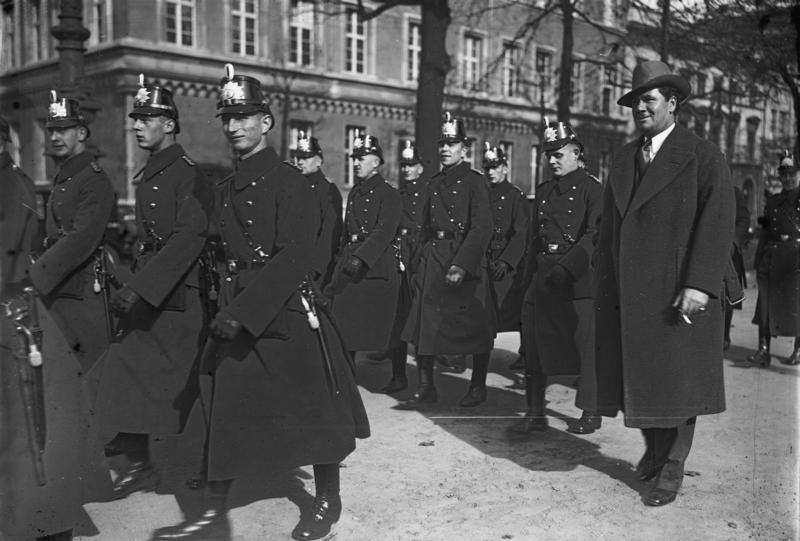
George Bancroft in Berlin (1929)

Bancroft was born in Philadelphia, Pennsylvania, in 1882. He attended Tomes Institute in Port Deposit, Maryland.

== Maritime work ==
After working on merchant marine vessels at age 14, Bancroft was an apprentice on USS Constellation and later served on USS Essex and West Indies. Additionally, during the Battle of Manila Bay (1898), he was a gunner on USS Baltimore. During his days in the Navy, he staged plays aboard ship.

In 1900, he swam underneath the hull of the battleship USS Oregon to check the extent of the damage after it struck a rock off the coast of China. For this, he was appointed to the United States Naval Academy, but found it too restrictive for his tastes and left to pursue a theatrical career. (Note: The reference work American Classic Screen Profiles says of Bancroft, "He left the Academy after one year for a theatrical career.")

== Acting career ==
In 1901, Bancroft began acting in earnest, as he toured in plays and had juvenile leads in musical comedies. In vaudeville, he did blackface routines and impersonated celebrities. His Broadway credits include the musical comedies Cinders (1923, as Great Scott) and The Rise of Rosie O'Reilly (1923).

One of his early films was The Journey's End (1921). Bancroft's first starring role was in The Pony Express (1925), and the next year he played an important supporting role in a cast including Wallace Beery, Charles Farrell and Esther Ralston in the period naval widescreen epic Old Ironsides (1926). He then had his finest period as a lead actor, starring in four Paramount productions directed by Josef von Sternberg: Underworld (1927), The Drag Net (1928), The Docks of New York (1928) and Thunderbolt (1929); the latter earning him a nomination for the Academy Award for Best Actor. (Note: The Academy Awards Database provides this comment: "[NOTE: THIS IS NOT AN OFFICIAL NOMINATION. There were no announcements of nominations, no certificates of nomination or honorable mention, and only the winners (*) were revealed during the awards banquet on April 3, 1930. Though not official nominations, the additional names in each category, according to in-house records, were under consideration by the various boards of judges.]") He played the title role in The Wolf of Wall Street (1929, released just prior to the Wall Street Crash), appeared in Paramount's all-star revue Paramount on Parade (1930) and starred in Rowland Brown's Blood Money (1933), condemned by the censors because they feared the film would "incite law-abiding citizens to crime."

Reportedly, he refused to fall down on set after a prop revolver was fired at him, saying "Just one bullet can't stop Bancroft!".

Bancroft enjoyed his career height in the late 1920s, his thirties' films where he was the leading man, didn't quite have the same impact and by 1936 he had slipped to being a supporting actor; although he still appeared in such classics as Mr. Deeds Goes to Town (1936) with Gary Cooper, Angels with Dirty Faces (1938) with James Cagney and Humphrey Bogart, Each Dawn I Die (1939) with Cagney and George Raft, and Stagecoach (1939) with John Wayne and Thomas Mitchell. In 1942, he left Hollywood to be a full-time rancher.

== Personal life ==
Bancroft first married actress Edna Brothers in 1913. Three years later, he married musical comedy star Octavia Broske. In 1934, Brothers sued him, claiming they had never divorced. Two years later, the case was settled, and Brothers obtained a divorce.

== Death ==
On October 2, 1956, Bancroft died in Santa Monica, California, at age 74. He was interred there in the Woodlawn Memorial Cemetery.

== Complete filmography ==
Year	Title	Role	Notes
1921	The Journey's End	The Ironworker	
1922	The Prodigal Judge	Cavendish	
1923	Driven	Lem Tolliver	
1924	Teeth	Dan Angus	
1924	The Deadwood Coach	Tex Wilson – in play	
1925	Code of the West	Enoch Thurman	
1925	The Rainbow Trail	Jake Willets	
1925	The Pony Express	Jack Slade	
1925	The Splendid Road	Buck Lockwell	
1926	The Enchanted Hill	Ira Todd	
1926	Sea Horses	Cochran	
1926	The Runaway	Lesher Skidmore	
1926	Old Ironsides	Gunner	
1927	White Gold	Sam Randall	
1927	Too Many Crooks	Bert the Boxman	
1927	Underworld	"Bull" Weed	
1927	Tell It to Sweeney	Cannonball Casey	
1927	The Rough Riders	Happy Joe	
1928	The Showdown	Cardan	
1928	The Drag Net	Two-Gun Nolan	
1928	The Docks of New York	Bill Roberts	
1929	The Wolf of Wall Street	The Wolf	
1929	Thunderbolt	Thunderbolt Jim Lang	
1929	The Mighty	Blake Greeson	
1930	Paramount on Parade	Mug (Impulses)	
1930	Ladies Love Brutes	Joe Forziati	
1930	Derelict	Bill Rafferty	
1931	Scandal Sheet	Mark Flint	
1931	Rich Man's Folly	Brock Trumbull	
1932	The World and the Flesh	Kylenko	
1932	Lady and Gent	Stag Bailey	
1933	Blood Money	Bill Bailey	
1934	Elmer and Elsie	Elmer Beebe	
1936	Hell-Ship Morgan	Captain Ira 'Hell-Ship' Morgan	
1936	Mr. Deeds Goes to Town	MacWade	
1936	Wedding Present	Pete Wagg	
1937	A Doctor's Diary	Dr. Clem Driscoll	
1937	John Meade's Woman	Tim Mathews	
1937	Racketeers in Exile	William Waldo	
1938	Submarine Patrol	Capt. Leeds	
1938	Angels with Dirty Faces	Mac Keefer	
1939	Stagecoach	Marshal Curley Wilcox	
1939	Each Dawn I Die	John Armstrong	
1939	Espionage Agent	Dudley Garrett	
1939	Rulers of the Sea	Captain Oliver	
1940	Green Hell	"Tex" Morgan	
1940	Young Tom Edison	Samuel 'Sam' Edison	
1940	When the Daltons Rode	Caleb Winters	
1940	Northwest Mounted Police	Jacques Corbeau	
1940	Little Men	Major Burdle	
1941	Texas	Windy Miller	
1942	The Bugle Sounds	'Russ' Russell	
1942	Syncopation	Steve Porter	
1942	Whistling in Dixie	Sheriff Claude Stagg	
