= The Docks of New York =

1928 film

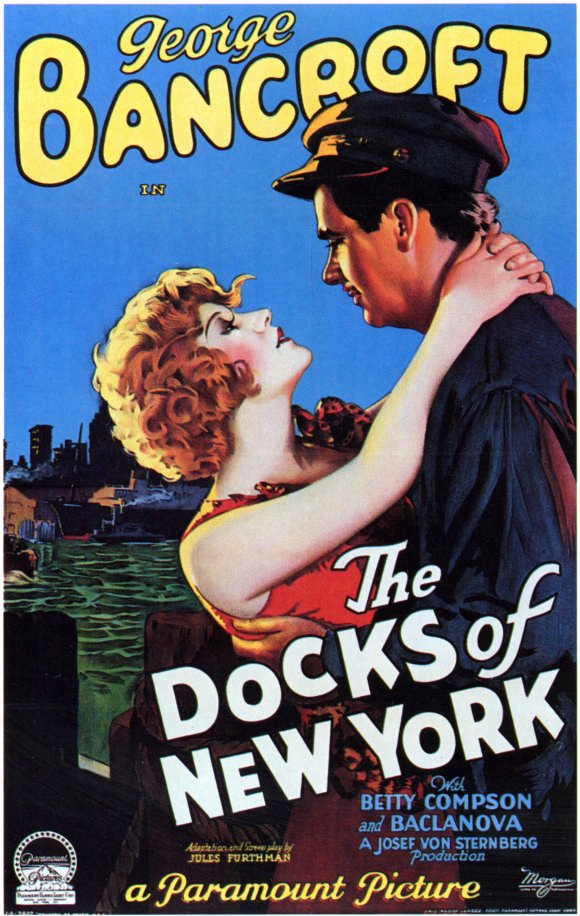
- Theatrical release poster
- Directed by: Josef von Sternberg
- Written by: Jules Furthman
- Based on: The Dock Walloper by John Monk Saunders
- Produced by: J. G. Bachmann
- Starring: George Bancroft; Betty Compson; Olga Baclanova
- Cinematography: Harold Rosson
- Edited by: Helen Lewis
- Distributed by: Paramount Pictures
- Release date: September 16, 1928
- Running time: 76 minutes
- Country: United States
- Language: Silent (English intertitles)

The Docks of New York is a 1928 American silent drama film directed by Josef von Sternberg and starring George Bancroft, Betty Compson, and Olga Baclanova. The movie was adapted by Jules Furthman from the John Monk Saunders story The Dock Walloper.

== Plot ==
The Docks of New York (1928)

An American tramp steamer docks in New York harbor sometime in the early years of the 20th century before prohibition. In the bowels of the ship, coal stokers are shutting down the furnaces in the anticipation of shore leave for the night. The bullying third engineer, Andy (Mitchell Lewis), warns the exhausted crew that they will be punished if they return drunk when the vessel sails the following morning. The stokers gather to leer at crude pornographic graffiti scrawled on the engine room wall before debarking to carouse at the local gin-mills.

On shore, Andy enters The Sandbar, dance-hall saloon, craving a beer and female companionship. He has an unexpected encounter with his estranged wife, Lou (Olga Baclanova). During his absence of three years, she has become a habitué of the saloon, where she freely enjoys male companionship. The “couple” join one another for a drink; no love is lost between them.

The stoker Bill Roberts (George Bancroft) – a swaggering brawler when on leave – rescues a drowning prostitute named Mae (Betty Compson) who has leapt off the dock to end her sordid life. Bill, ignoring the admonishment of his sidekick “Sugar” Steve (Clyde Cook), impassively carries the semi-conscious woman to a room above The Sandbar, indifferent to the protests from the proprietor's wife, Mrs. Crimp (May Foster). Lou intercedes to provide first-aid and revives Mae, a fallen angel like herself. Bill's growing awareness of Mae's physical beauty assumes a proprietary quality. He fetches her a beverage from the bar and presents her with a pretty dress he steals from a pawn shop next door. Bill exhorts her to join him for the evening, and Mae, distraught and vulnerable, accepts his invitation. They meet downstairs in the raucous tavern.

Andy attempts to pull rank and cut in on the couple, but the powerful stoker drives him off with blows. Lou, observing her husband's boorishness, looks on with contempt. Mae and Bill mutually confess their sexual histories to one another, she with regret, he with masculine pride. So as to win Mae's favors for the night, Bill consents to marry her on the spot, and Mae wistfully obliges.

The local missionary “Hymn Book” Harry (Gustav von Seyffertitz) is summoned to administer the sacrament. Lou gives Mae her own wedding ring, which she no longer needs. The couple exchange vows while the patrons observe, initially with mock solemnity, before cheering when the newlyweds kiss.

The following morning, Bill slips quietly from the flophouse honeymoon suite, without a word to Mae. Andy, observing that the stoker is abandoning his “wife”, goes to Mae's room, where she has just discovered Bill's desertion. Andy attempts to force himself on her, but Lou arrives and guns him down. The police suspect Mae of the murder, but Lou confesses and is arrested.

Under the blandishments of “Sugar” Steve, Bill takes leave of Mae. Driven to distraction by his perfidy, she angrily drives him from her room.

Aboard the steamer, Bill has an epiphany. He bolts from the subterranean furnaces to the sunny deck, leaps overboard and swims to shore. There he inquires as to Mae's whereabouts and discovers that she is in custody at Night Court, charged with stealing the clothing he had bestowed on her. Moments after the judge sentences her to jail, Bill presents himself and confesses to the crime, exonerating Mae. He pledges to reunite with Mae after he serves his 60-day sentence, and she agrees to wait for him.

== Cast ==
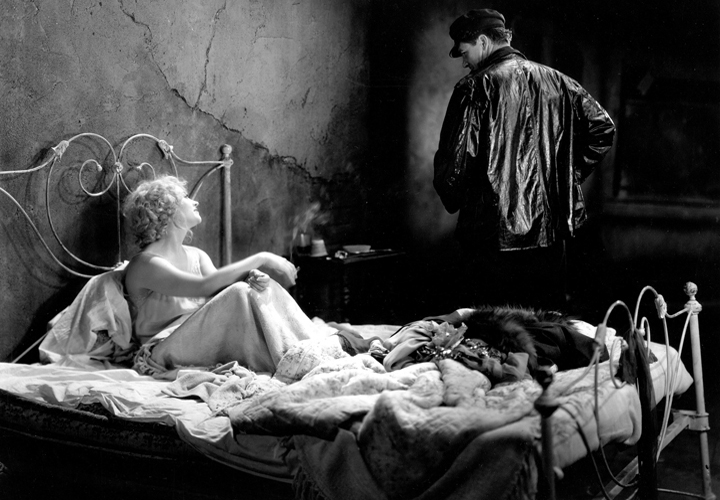
Betty Compson and George Bancroft in The Docks of New York

- George Bancroft as Bill Roberts
- Betty Compson as Mae
- Olga Baclanova as Lou (Andy's wife)
- Clyde Cook – "Sugar" Steve (Bill's buddy)
- Mitchell Lewis as Andy (the third engineer)
- Gustav von Seyffertitz as "Hymn Book" Harry

=== Uncredited ===
- Richard Alexander as Lou's Sweetheart
- May Foster as Mrs. Crimp
- George Irving as Night Court Judge
- John Kelly as Sailor Barfly
- Charles McMurphy as Policeman
- Guy Oliver as The Crimp
- Bob Reeves as Court Bailiff
- Lillian Worth as Steve's Girl

== Production ==
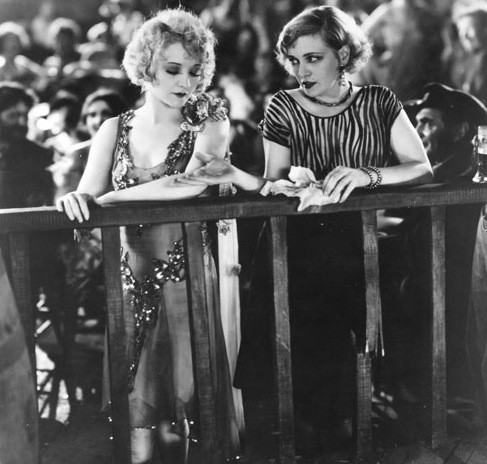
Lou (Olga Baclanova) bestows the wedding ring from her failed marriage on the newlywed Mae (Betty Compson).

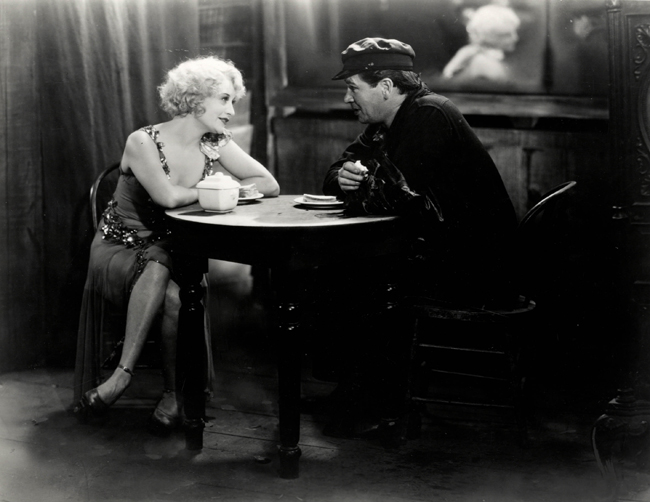
Mae (Betty Compson) and Bill (George Bancroft). The couple discuss marriage in the rowdy saloon.

On May 5, 1928, Paramount Pictures announced their next picture would be The Docks of New York; with Josef von Sternberg enlisted to direct and George Bancroft to star with an adapted script of Monk Saunders's The Dock Walloper provided by Jules Furthman. Before production von Sternberg and Furthman went to New York to conduct research for the film.

A highly collaborative work, The Docks of New York benefited from the screenwriting of Jules Furthman, such that “the director’s vision...cannot be easily distinguished from Furthman’s scenarios." Scripting for Sternberg's most celebrated movies, among them Morocco (1930), Shanghai Express (1932) and Blonde Venus (1932) was provided by Furthmann. Sternberg also benefited from the cinematography of Harold Rosson, who was inspired by the director's “fresh, innovative ideas.” Art director Hans Dreier, formerly of Germany's UFA, created the evocative set for the Sandbar saloon with its subjective demimonde atmosphere of Sternberg's New York waterfront. Dreier would subsequently oversee studio production design for decades as head of Paramount's art department.

Production began on the film on June 25, with principal photography beginning on July 10, 1928. The production was shot entirely at Paramount Studios where they created sets to resemble the New York City waterfront.

The Motion Picture Producers and Distributors of America, formed by the film industry in 1922, regulated the content of films through a list of subjects that were to be avoided. While Betty Compson portrayed a prostitute in The Docks of New York, this was acceptable as prostitution was not explicitly barred so long as it was not forced (i.e., white slavery) and aspects of her work was not directly shown in the film. The wedding ceremony held in the bar makes later activities in the film ambiguous.

== Release ==
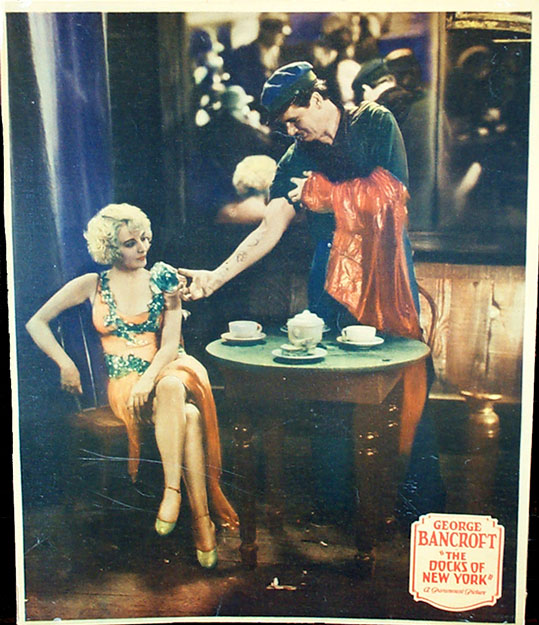
Lobby card for The Docks of New York

The film opened in New York City on September 16, 1928, at the Paramount Theatre and was released on September 29 throughout other parts of the country. The film earned $88,000 in its first week of release at the Paramount Theatre, breaking a record set previously by von Sternberg's 1927 film Underworld, also starring George Bancroft.

== Reception ==
Variety called the film “a corking program picture” and says the film misses greatness by a “whisker”. They also praised the performance of Bancroft, the direction of von Sternberg, the cinematography of Harold Rosson, and the intertitles from Julian Johnson.

Film critic John Baxter observed that "The Docks of New York...is today the most popular of Sternberg's silent films, although it did poorly at the box-office on its release."

The Docks of New York was one of the last films of the silent era. Previewed by the New York City press during the same week that saw the fanfare opening of Al Jolson’s The Singing Fool, Sternberg’s film was “completely passed over in the clamor” that accompanied the advent of talking pictures. Film critic Andrew Sarris lamented that Sternberg's film “quickly vanished in undeserved oblivion...confirm[ing] Chaplin’s observation that the silent movies learned their craft just about the time they went out of business.”

Museum of Modern Art film curator Charles Silver ranked The Docks of New York as “probably the last genuinely great silent film made in Hollywood [rivaling] Chaplin’s masterpieces of the 1930s.” With respect to Sternberg's oeuvre, The Docks of New York was “the first in which his prodigious pictorial genius was fully realized.” A “deceptively simple” and ‘emotionally affecting film”, Sternberg combined spectacle and emotion, where "his characters gain in clarity what they lose in complexity."

The Docks of New York was added to the Criterion Collection as part of the “Three Silent Classics by Josef von Sternberg” series.

== Themes ==
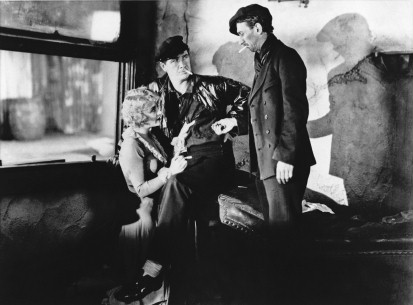
L-R: Mae (Betty Compson), Bill (George Bancroft), "Sugar" Steve (Clyde Cook). The "sewing scene" - An "emotional transition" in the couple's relationship.

Despite the lurid mise-en-scène that provides the canvas for Sternberg's imagination, the film is neither "a crime thriller, nor a hardboiled noir...The Docks of New York is an elegant and elegiac love story [and] the most emotionally affecting film" of Sternberg's career.

A standard melodrama with a "deceptively simple" plot, Sternberg does not dwell upon the social conditions of the working class figures; he is "not concerned with the class consciousness of the characters." Rather than striving to be realistic, Sternberg's photography served to "give visual experience feelings more than facts." Through the combination of camera movement (as opposed to montage) and his mise-en-scène compositions "that closely resemble German expressionist cinema", Sternberg conveys a "deeply felt emotional maturity and raw passion not previously seen on the American screen."

Film critic William Blick reserves special mention for the film's wedding scene:

"The wedding scene is perhaps the most memorable in the film, after Bill has agreed to marry Mae as a dare. In the crowded bar, a preacher is dragged in to issue the vows. Bill takes his vows knowing that he cannot keep them, and Mae earnestly accepts hers while others mock. The sharp contrast between the barroom setting and the solemnity of the wedding vows makes for an interesting paradox; one that runs throughout the film and focuses upon doomed companionship amidst the canvas of the docks of New York."

Critic Andrew Sarris considers the "sewing" scene, with its use of "subjective camera" the key psychological moment of the film:

"Sternberg quietly dramatizes the emotional transition with a scene in which Compson sews Bancroft's pocket after it has been torn by Bancroft's jealous buddy [Clyde Cook]. This pocket, like Desdemona's handkerchief, becomes the visual correlative of the drama, the battleground between conjugal feelings and fraternal loyalties. To emphasize the stakes in this struggle, Sternberg even shifts from an objective to a subjective camera viewpoint by photographing out-of-focus the needle Compson tries to thread through her tears. When Bancroft take the needle away and threads it himself, the domestic irony of the situation takes on a new dimension. It becomes psychologically through this external gesture that Bancroft needs Compson's love more than her care, and that, conversely, Compson has more love in her than care..."

== Accolades ==
In 1999, The Docks of New York was selected for preservation in the National Film Registry of the Library of Congress. being deemed "culturally, historically, or aesthetically significant".

== Sources ==
- Baxter, John. 1971. The Cinema of Josef von Sternberg. The International Film Guide Series. A.S Barners & Company, New York.
- Blick, William. 2012. The Docks of New York The Senses of Cinema: CINÉMATHÈQUE ANNOTATIONS ON FILM. Retrieved April 26, 2018. http://sensesofcinema.com/2012/cteq/the-docks-of-new-york/
- Muller, Eddie. 2012. The Docks of New York: San Francisco Silent Film Festival, 2012. Retrieved April 26, 2018. http://www.silentfilm.org/archive/the-docks-of-new-york
- Sarris, Andrew. 1966. The Films of Josef von Sternberg. Museum of Modern Art/Doubleday. New York, New York.
- Silver, Charles. 2010. Josef von Sternberg’s The Docks of New York. https://www.moma.org/explore/inside_out/2010/05/11/josef-von-sternbergs-the-docks-of-new-york/ Retrieved August 11, 2018.
- Weinberg, Herman G., 1967. Josef von Sternberg. A Critical Study. New York: Dutton.
