= Helen Lewis (film editor) =

Canadian film editor (1898–??)

- Born: 11 April 1898; Ontario, Canada
- Occupation: Film editor
- Years active: 1928–1947

Helen Lewis was a Canadian film editor who worked in the British film industry in the 1920s through the 1940s; early on in her career, she frequently worked with director Josef von Sternberg. Her first known credit was on 1928's The Dragnet. Her date of death is unknown.

== Selected filmography ==
- Mother and Her Child (1947)
- Coal Face, Canada (1943)
- Talk of the Devil (1936)
- Lady in Danger (1934)
- Turkey Time (1933)
- A Cuckoo in the Nest (1933)
- Wives Beware (1932)
- Thunderbolt (1929)
- The Case of Lena Smith (1929)
- The Docks of New York (1928)
- The Dragnet (1928)
