= Thunderbolt (1929 film) =

1929 film

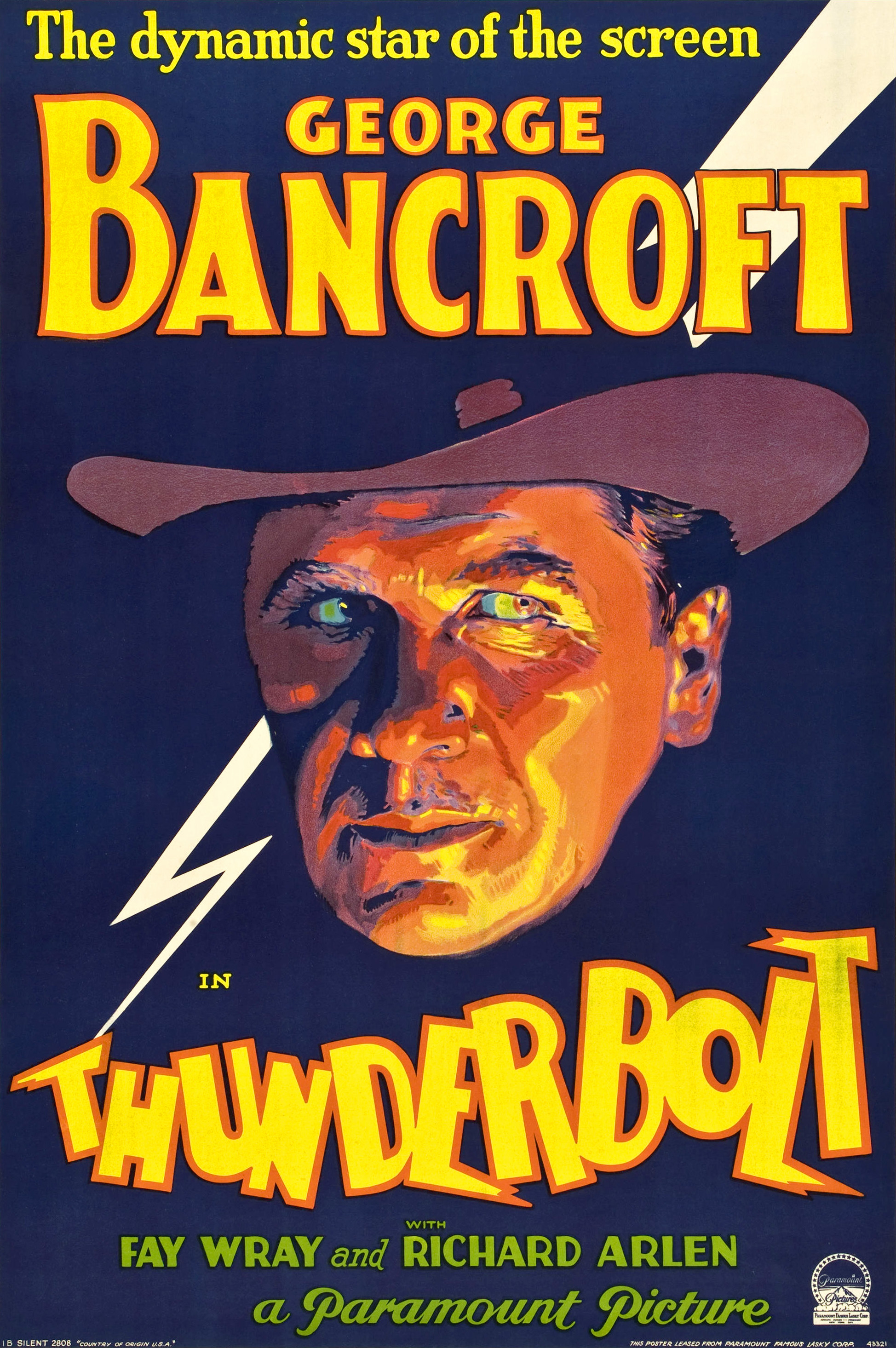
- Full-bleed theatrical release poster
- Directed by: Josef von Sternberg
- Screenplay by: Jules Furthman; Herman Mankiewicz
- Story by: Charles Furthman; Jules Furthman
- Produced by: B. P. Fineman
- Starring: George Bancroft; Fay Wray; Richard Arlen; Tully Marshall; Eugénie Besserer
- Cinematography: Henry W. Gerrard
- Edited by: Helen Lewis
- Color process: Black and white
- Distributed by: Paramount Pictures
- Release date: June 20, 1929 (U.S.)
- Running time: 91 minutes
- Country: United States
- Language: English

Thunderbolt (also released as At The Gates of Death) is a 1929 American pre-Code proto-noir film directed by Josef von Sternberg and starring George Bancroft, Fay Wray, Richard Arlen, Tully Marshall and Eugenie Besserer. It tells the story of a criminal, facing execution, who wants to kill the man in the next cell for being in love with his former girlfriend.

The film was adapted by Herman J. Mankiewicz, Joseph L. Mankiewicz (titles) and Josef von Sternberg from the story by Jules and Charles Furthman.

Bancroft was nominated for the Academy Award for Best Actor.

== Plot ==
The film Thunderbolt (1929)

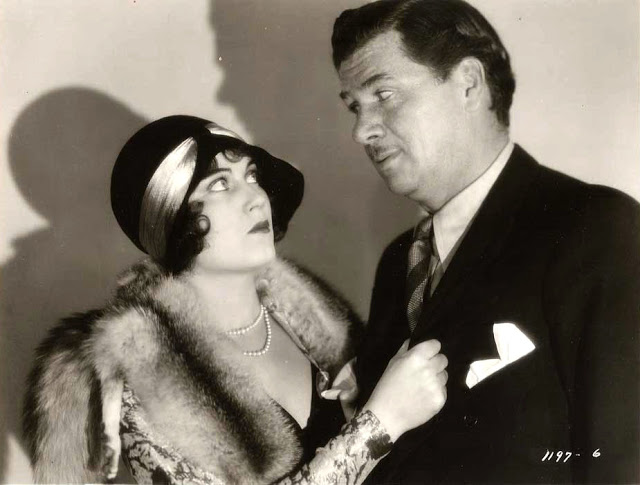
Still with Fay Wray and George Bancroft

Thunderbolt Jim Lang (George Bancroft), wanted on robbery and murder charges, ventures out with his girl, "Ritzie" (Fay Wray), to a Harlem nightclub, where she informs him that she is going straight. During a raid on the club, Thunderbolt escapes. His gang shadows Ritzie and reports that she is living with Mrs. Moran (Eugenie Besserer), whose son, Bob (Richard Arlen), a bank clerk, is in love with Ritzie. Fearing for Bob's safety, Ritzie engineers a police trap for Thunderbolt; he escapes but is later captured, tried, and sentenced to be executed at Sing Sing. From the death house, he successfully plots to frame Bob in a bank robbery and killing. Bob is placed in the facing cell, and guards frustrate Thunderbolt's attempts to get to his rival. When Ritzie marries Bob in the death house, Thunderbolt confesses his part in Bob's conviction. He plots to kill the boy on the night of his execution, but instead at the last minute his hand falls on Bob's shoulder in a gesture of friendship.

== Cast ==
- George Bancroft as Thunderbolt Jim Lang
- Fay Wray as Ritzie
- Richard Arlen as Bob Moran
- Tully Marshall as Warden
- Eugenie Besserer as Mrs. Moran
- James Spottswood as 'Snapper' O'Shea
- Robert Elliott as Prison Chaplain
- Fred Kohler as 'Bad Al' Frieberg
- E.H. Calvert as Dist. Atty. McKay
- George Irving as Mr. Corwin
- Mike Donlin as Kentucky Sampson - Prisoner #4
- S.S. Stewart as Prisoner #7 - Piano Player
- William L. Thorne as Police Inspector

Rest of cast listed alphabetically:

- Ernie Adams as Thug in Bank at Robbery (uncredited)
- Elmer Ballard as Prisoner #8 (uncredited)
- Louise Beavers as Black Cat Cafe Patron (uncredited)
- Ed Brady as Chuck - 1st Prisoner #5 (uncredited)
- Theresa Harris as Black Cat Cafe Singer (uncredited)
- Jerry Mandy as Shorty - 2nd Prisoner #5 (uncredited)
- Lew Meehan as 2nd Arresting Detective (uncredited)
- Mosby's Blue Blowers as Black Cat Musical Ensemble (uncredited)
- Dick Rush as 1st Arresting Detective (uncredited)
- Rolfe Sedan as 1st Prison Doctor (uncredited)
- Oscar Smith as Black Cat Cafe Maitre d' (uncredited)
- Charles Sullivan as Thug Who Grabs Moran (uncredited)

== Production ==
=== Sound ===
“Josef von Sternberg has suffered perhaps more than any other director from the vagaries of film criticism; on the one hand he has been seen as a mannered, self-indulgent stylist with a trivial and dehumanized vision of the world, and on the other as a cult figure largely associated with the mystique of Marlene Dietrich, with whom he made seven films, beginning in The Blue Angel in 1930 and ending with The Devil is a Woman in 1935.
—Film historian Claire Johnston - "Sternberg’s Thunderbolt" - in Focus on Film, 1970

Thunderbolt was Sternberg’s first film using synchronized sound technology. Two versions of the film were produced, including a silent version for theatres that had yet to be adapted to sound.

The technical innovation of synchronized dialogue in the film raised concerns among directors as to its potential influence on the visual techniques available to directors. Internationally, filmmakers such as Sergei Eisenstein, Vsevolod Pudovkin, Alfred Hitchcock, and Dziga Vertov wished to avoid oppressive forms of ”theatrically-influenced dialogue” even as audiences clamored for the novelty of naturalistic speech.

Sternberg welcomed sound as a means to achieve complete control over his picture - "no longer at the mercy of movie house organists" - and eschewing any "atmospheric" or background music. Thunderbolt (as well as his next three sound films) used source music that arose directly from the mise en scène.

Sternberg experimented with asynchronous sound effects which served to augment or supplement the visual effects, or as he framed the process, “To be correctly and effectively used, the sound had to bring to the image a quality other than what the lens included, a quality out of the range of the image. Sound had to counterpoint or compensate the image, add to it – not subtract from it.” Throughout Thunderbolt, Sternberg “uses sound to paint audio images” through “complementary and contrapuntal juxtaposition.” Rather than the external and complementary musical accompaniment of silent films, Sternberg’s scores arise organically with the mise-en-scène and form a key component of the film.

The music off-screen does not recede in deference to the on-screen dialogue, but competes with it. Off-screen, voices comment on the visual action, but are not identified visually until later in the film sequence, contributing to an “unrealistic cadence” that characterizes the film’s dialogue. Film historian Andrew Sarris describes it as "a startling experiment... his use of sound and music for mood effects, and the very unreality of his style seems to justify the unusual density of his sound track." Sternberg also uses sound expressionistically, such as the erratic start-stop of a sewing machine or the “sinister” squeaking of a dog’s ball toy, squeezed by the condemned criminal in the hours before his death.

== Reception ==
Mordaunt Hall writing for The New York Times (June 21, 1929) described the screenplay as “a musical comedy plot striving to masquerade as drama.” Film critic Andrew Sarris would echo that assessment in 1966, writing “Thunderbolt is, in some respects, as much a musical as a melodrama.”

Film historian Janet Bergstrom points out that “reviewers were relieved that Sternberg had returned to the gangster genre he had invented and made popular", as in this review entitled “Thunderbolt Registers Hit” from Norbert Lusk of the Los Angeles Times (June 30, 1929):

”Those who applauded [Sternberg’s] Underworld and The Drag Net find new pleasure well worth their patronage…As in previous undertakings of Josef von Sternberg, lighting and direction have brought forth critical praise though in some quarters the observation is made that these more or less synthetic crook stories are unworthy of his ability. However, there is no denying the skill he employs in assembling the various elements of box-office entertainment…”

German filmmaker Ludwig Berger contacted Sternberg via telegram with lavish praise: "I saw your film Thunderbolt and congratulate you with all my heart. It is the first fully realized and artistically accomplished Sound film. Bravo!"

== See also ==
- List of early sound feature films (1926–1929)

== Sources ==
- Axmaker, Sean. 2010. Silents Please: Shadows, Silence and Sternberg. Parallax View. Retrieved May 10, 2018. http://parallax-view.org/2010/08/26/shadows-and-silence-and-josef-von-sternberg-john-cassavetes-and-citizen-mccain-dvds-of-the-week/
- Baxter, John. 1971. The Cinema of Josef von Sternberg. The International Film Guide Series. A.S Barners & Company, New York.
- Bergstrom, Janet. 2007. The Sternberg Paradox: The Case of Lena Smith. in Horwath, Alexander and Omasta, Michael(Ed.). 2007. Josef von Sternberg. The Case of Lena Smith. Vienna: SYNEMA - Gesellschaft für Film und Medien, 2007, ISBN 978-3-901644-22-1 (Filmmuseum-Synema-Publikationen Vol. 5).
- Dill, Diana. 2012. The Crank: Thunderbolt Program Notes, October 28, 2012. Retrieved June 1, 2018. http://www.tft.ucla.edu/mediascape/blog/the-crank-thunderbolt-program-notes-101112-screening/
- Johnston, Claire. 1970. Sternberg’s Thunderbolt. Focus on Film no. 2, 1970, p. 54, in Senses of Cinema, Tony Williams. Before Dietrich: Sound Technique and Thunderbolt. Senses of Cinema, April 2009, Issue 50. Retrieved May 31, 2018. http://sensesofcinema.com/2009/cteq/thunderbolt/*Sarris, Andrew. 1966. The Films of Josef von Sternberg. Museum of Modern Art/Doubleday. New York, New York. ASIN B000LQTJG4
- Williams, Tony. 2009. Before Dietrich: Sound Technique and Thunderbolt. Senses of Cinema, April 2009, Issue 50. Retrieved May 31, 2018. http://sensesofcinema.com/2009/cteq/thunderbolt/
