= Underworld (1927 film) =

1927 gangster film

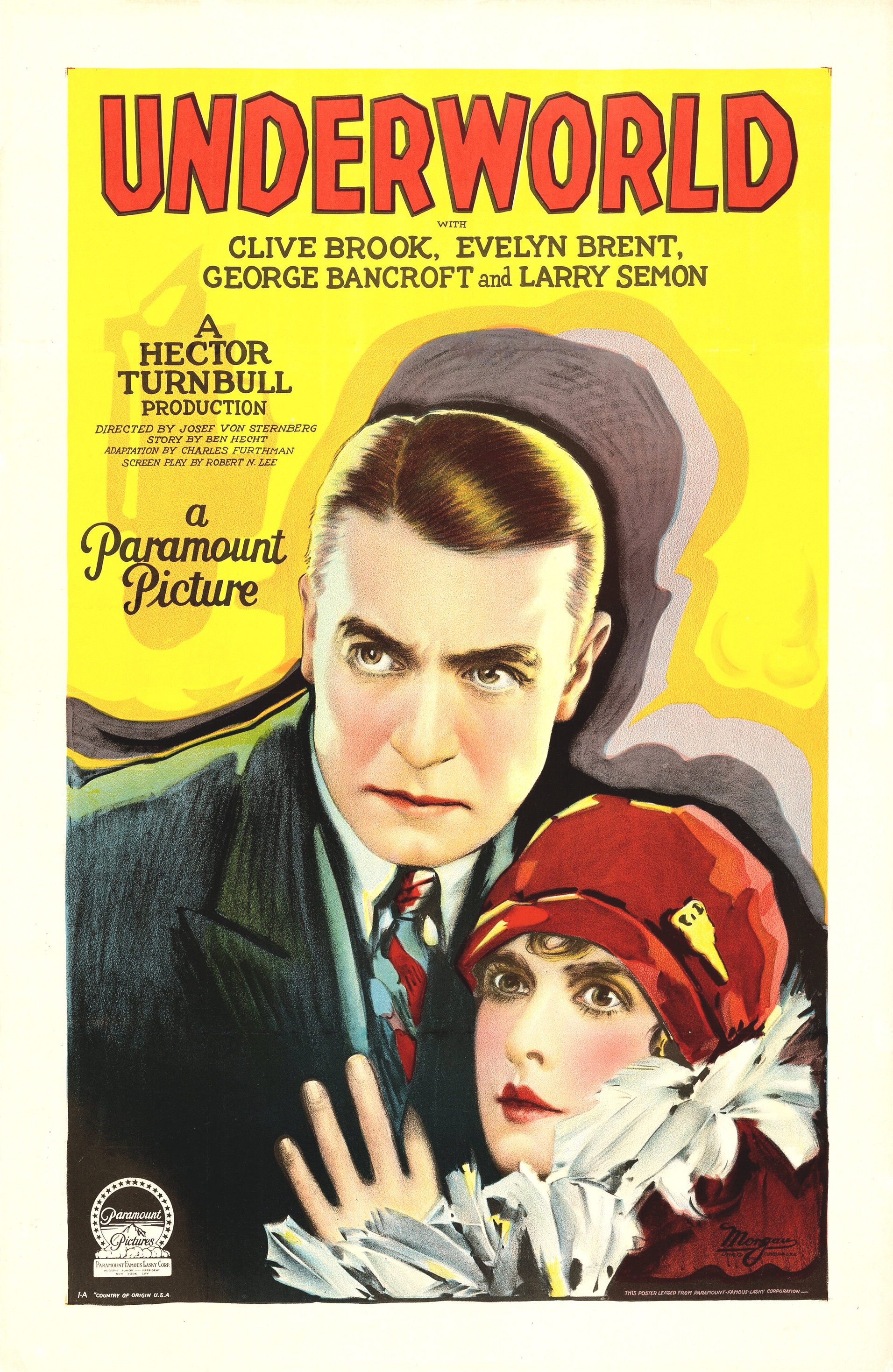
- Theatrical one-sheet release poster
- Directed by: Josef von Sternberg
- Written by: Ben Hecht; Charles Furthman; Robert N. Lee
- Produced by: Hector Turnbull; B. P. Schulberg
- Starring: Clive Brook; Evelyn Brent; George Bancroft; Larry Semon; Fred Kohler
- Cinematography: Bert Glennon
- Edited by: E. Lloyd Sheldon
- Production company: Paramount Pictures
- Distributed by: Paramount Pictures
- Release date: August 20, 1927
- Running time: 80 minutes
- Country: United States
- Language: Silent (English intertitles)

Underworld (also released as Paying the Penalty) is a 1927 American silent gangster film directed by Josef von Sternberg and starring Clive Brook, Evelyn Brent and George Bancroft. It is considered one of the earliest examples of the film noir genre. The film launched Sternberg's eight-year collaboration with Paramount Pictures, with whom he would produce his seven films with actress Marlene Dietrich. Journalist and screenwriter Ben Hecht won an Academy Award for Best Original Story.

== Plot ==
Underworld (1927)

Boisterous gangster kingpin 'Bull' Weed rehabilitates the down-and-out 'Rolls Royce' Wensel, a former lawyer who has fallen into alcoholism. The two become confidants, with Rolls Royce's intelligence aiding Weed's schemes, but complications arise when Rolls Royce falls for Weed's girlfriend 'Feathers' McCoy.

Adding to Weed's troubles are attempts by a rival gangster, 'Buck' Mulligan, to muscle in on his territory. Their antagonism climaxes with Weed killing Mulligan and he is imprisoned. Awaiting a death sentence, Rolls Royce devises an escape plan, but he and Feathers face a dilemma, wondering if they should elope together and leave Bull Weed to his fate.

== Cast ==
- Clive Brook as "Rolls Royce" Wensel
- Evelyn Brent as "Feathers" McCoy
- George Bancroft as "Bull" Weed
- Fred Kohler as "Buck" Mulligan
- Helen Lynch as Meg, Mulligan's girl
- Larry Semon as "Slippy" Lewis
- Jerry Mandy as Paloma
- Alfred Allen as Judge (uncredited)
- Shep Houghton as Street Kid (uncredited)
- Andy MacLennan as One of Laughing Faces at the Ball (uncredited)
- Ida May as Laughing Woman at the Ball (uncredited)
- Karl Morse as 'High Collar' Sam (uncredited)
- Bob Reeves as Detective at Railroad Station (uncredited)
- Julian Rivero as One of Buck's Henchmen (uncredited)

== Background ==
Josef von Sternberg's brief tenure as director at M-G-M was terminated by mutual consent in 1925 shortly after he walked off the set of a Mae Murray vehicle The Masked Bride. The film was completed by director Christy Cabanne.

Sternberg's next project was an assignment by Charlie Chaplin (United Artists) to write and direct A Woman of the Sea starring Edna Purviance. This episode also ended badly: the film was never released and Chaplin felt compelled to destroy all film negatives. As Sternberg sardonically quipped in his 1965 memoir Fun in a Chinese Laundry, "It was [Edna Purviance]'s last film and nearly my own."

Sternberg accepted a contract offer from Paramount Pictures in 1926, with the humbling condition that he was demoted to the role of assistant director. He was quickly assigned to reshoot portions of director Frank Lloyd's Children of Divorce. His work was so outstanding that the studio awarded him with a project of his own. The result was his most famous film to date of his career -Underworld. The film would "establish Sternberg in the Hollywood system."

== Production ==
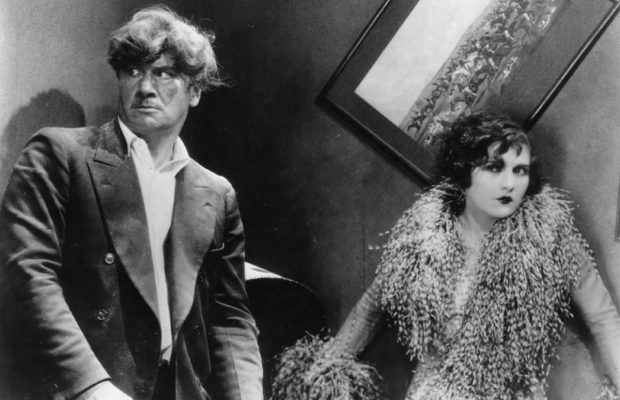
George Bancroft (left) and Evelyn Brent

Underworld is based on a story by Ben Hecht, a former Chicago crime reporter, and adapted for screenplay by Robert N. Lee with titles by George Marion Jr. It was produced by B. P. Schulberg and Hector Turnbull with cinematography by Bert Glennon and edited by E. Lloyd Sheldon. Sternberg completed Underworld in a record-setting five weeks.

The gangster role played by George Bancroft was modeled on "Terrible" Tommy O'Connor, an Irish-American mobster who gunned down Chicago Police Chief Padraig O'Neil in 1923 but escaped three days before execution and was never apprehended.

Paramount Pictures, initially cool towards the production, predicted the film would fail. Initial release was limited to only one theater, the New York Paramount. The studio did not provide advance publicity. Writer Ben Hecht requested (unsuccessfully) to have his name taken off the credits, due to the dismal prospects for the film.

== Reception ==
Contrary to studio expectations, the public response to the New York screening was so positive that Paramount arranged for round-the-clock showings at the Paramount Theatre to "accommodate the unexpected crowds that flocked to the attraction." Director von Sternberg recalls the opening of Underworld in his 1965 autobiography:

Without benefit of normal publicity, my film opened at ten in the morning to avoid a review by the press, no critic being awake that early. Three hours later, no one knows why or how, Times Square was blocked by a huge crowd seeking to gain admission to the theatre, a crowd that stayed there and forced the theatre to stay open all night…thus inaugurating the era of gangster films and exhibitions of films around the clock.

"No director in the history of cinema can match Sternberg's preoccupation with the harmonies of hand signals ... to light a cigarette, to grasp a coffee cup, to fondle one's furs is, for Sternberg, equivalent to baring one's soul."

— Andrew Sarris, from The Films of Josef von Sternberg (1966).

Time felt the film was realistic in some parts, but disliked the Hollywood cliché of turning an evil character's heart to gold at the end.

Underworld was well-received overseas, especially in France, where directors Julien Duvivier and Marcel Carné were deeply impressed with Sternberg's "clinical and spartan" film technique. Filmmaker and surrealist Luis Buñuel named Underworld as his all-time favorite film.

Paramount, overjoyed at the film's "critical and commercial success" bestowed a gold medal and a $10,000 bonus on Sternberg. Ben Hecht won the Academy Award for Writing in the 1st Academy Awards ceremony in 1929 for his work on this film.

In 2008, the American Film Institute nominated this film for its Top 10 Gangster Films list.

== Theme ==
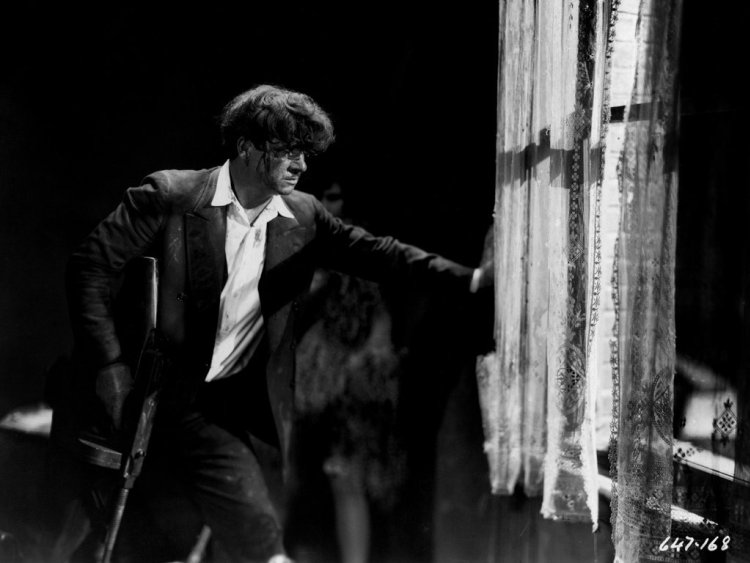
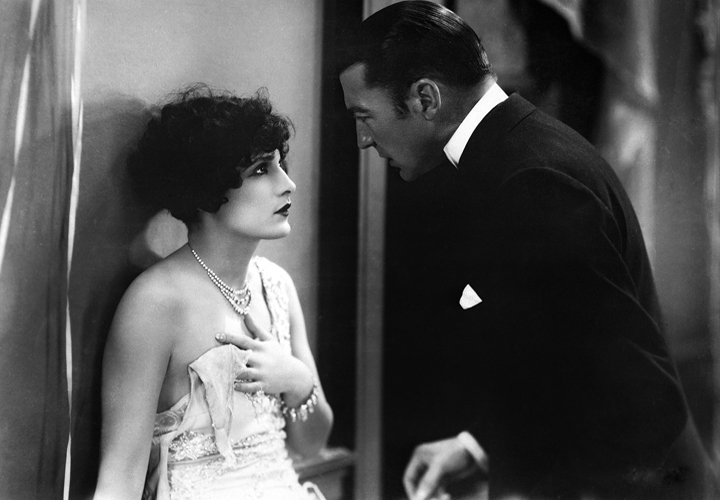
Left: "Bull" Weed (George Bancroft) in shootout with the police. Right: "Feathers" McCoy (Evelyn Brent), "Rolls Royce" Wensel (Clive Brook). "She recognizes the seriousness of his personality."

Sternberg has been credited with "launching the gangster film genre." Critic Andrew Sarris cautions that Underworld is "less a proto-gangster film than a pre-gangster film" in which the criminal world of the Prohibition Era provides a backdrop for a tragic tale of a "Byronic hero" destroyed, not by "the avenging forces of law and order" but by the eternal vicissitudes of "love, faith and falsehood."

Journalist Ben Hecht's influence appears in the phony flower shop operation and killing of "Bull" Weed's archenemy, "florist" Buck Mulligan, evoking the 1922 real-life murder of kingpin Dion O'Bannon by the Tony Torrios mob. Funeral hearses also abound in the film, notorious as capacious conveyances used to conceal criminal activities and personnel in Chicago. Despite these contemporary references, Underworld does not qualify as "the first gangster film" as Sternberg "showed little interest in the purely gangsterish aspects of the genre" nor the "mechanics of [mob] power." Rather than invoking contemporary social forces and inequities, Sternberg's "Bull" Weed is subject to "implacable Fate", much as the heroes of classical antiquity. The female companions to the outlaws are less gangster molls, addicted to violent men, but protagonists in their own right, who induce "revenge and redemption." The genre would only be properly established in such film classics as Little Caesar (1930), The Public Enemy (1931), Scarface (1932), High Sierra (1941), White Heat (1949), The Asphalt Jungle (1950) and The Killing (1956).

Film critic Dave Kehr, writing for the Chicago Reader in 2014, rates Underworld as one of the great gangster films of the silent era. "The film established the fundamental elements of the gangster movie: a hoodlum hero; ominous, night-shrouded city streets; floozies; and a blazing finale in which the cops cut down the protagonist."

== Preservation ==
Prints of Underworld are located in several film archives.

== See also ==
- The House That Shadows Built (1931 promotional film by Paramount)
- Pre-Code crime films

== Sources ==
- Axmaker, Sean. 2010. Silents Please: Shadows, Silence and Sternberg. Parallax View. Retrieved May 10, 2018. http://parallax-view.org/2010/08/26/shadows-and-silence-and-josef-von-sternberg-john-cassavetes-and-citizen-mccain-dvds-of-the-week/
- Barson, Michael. 2005. Josef von Sternberg: Austrian-American director. ENCYCLOPÆDIA BRITANNICA Online. Retrieved May 10, 2018. https://www.britannica.com/biography/Josef-von-Sternberg
- Rodriguez-Ortega, Vicente. 2005. Underworld. Senses of Cinema. Retrieved May 10, 2018. http://sensesofcinema.com/2005/cteq/underworld/
- Sarris, Andrew. 1966. The Films of Josef von Sternberg. Museum of Modern Art/Doubleday. New York, New York.
- Weinberg, Herman G., 1967. Josef von Sternberg. A Critical Study. New York: Dutton.
- Sternberg, Josef von. 1988. Fun in a Chinese Laundry. Mercury House, San Francisco, California. ISBN 0-916515-37-0 (pbk.)
