= Chasing Yesterday (film) =

1935 American historical drama film directed by George Nicholls Jr.

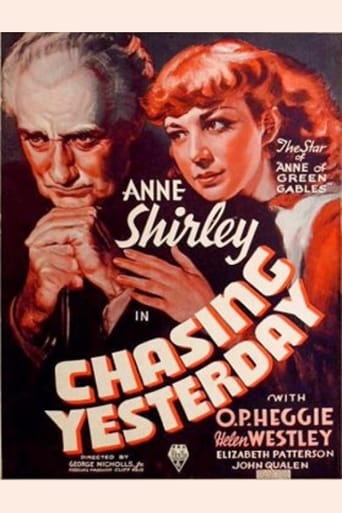
- Poster for the film
- Directed by: George Nicholls Jr.
- Written by: Francis Edward Faragoh
- Based on: the novel, Le Crime de Sylvestre Bonnard by Anatole France
- Produced by: Cliff Reid
- Starring: Anne Shirley; O. P. Heggie; Helen Westley
- Cinematography: Lucien Andriot
- Edited by: Arthur Schmidt
- Music by: Alberto Colombo
- Production company: RKO Radio Pictures
- Release date: May 3, 1935 (US)
- Running time: 80 minutes
- Country: United States
- Language: English

Chasing Yesterday is a 1935 American historical drama film directed by George Nicholls Jr. using a screenplay by Francis Edward Faragoh, adapted from the 1881 novel Le Crime de Sylvestre Bonnard, by Anatole France. Released on May 3, 1935, the film stars Anne Shirley, O. P. Heggie, and Helen Westley.

A Parisian book collector realizes that the only clue to the whereabouts of a long-missing rare book is a love note from his own youth. He returns to his hometown in search of the book, but instead discovers that his former lover has been survived by a teenage daughter. He becomes emotionally attached to the girl, and plans to adopt her. But he has to face the crooked lawyer who serves as her current legal guardian.

== Plot ==
Sylvestre Bonnard is an aging book collector. While going through his mementos one afternoon, he comes across a brief note written by a former lover. Studying it, he realizes that it is written on a page torn from a rare book that he has been seeking for decades. Excited, he decides to return to his home town, where he and the lover had their romance, to search for the book.

When Bonnard arrives, he meets an attorney, Mouche, through which he discovers that his old flame had a daughter, who now lives in a girl's boarding school. Mouche is the girl's guardian. Failing to find the book in his search, Bonnard travels to the school to speak with the daughter, Jeanne. On his arrival, he is dismayed to find that both Mouche and the school's headmistress, Mlle. Prefere, treat the young 15-year old cruelly. He is also entranced by the young lady, so much so that the focus of his trip now turns from a search for the book to an attempt to rescue the girl.

Sensing a way to escape the confines of the school, and unbeknownst to Bonnard, Jeanne convinces Mlle. Prefere that he is romantically interested in her. When Bonnard returns to his home in Paris, Jeanne tells Prefere that Bonnard would be thrilled if they paid him a visit there. When they arrive, Bonnard is thrilled, which Prefere misinterprets as a show of romantic interest. As time goes on and they remain in Paris, Prefere becomes more and more convinced that Bonnard is indeed in love with her. When she broaches the subject of marriage to the aging bibliophile he is aghast at the suggestion. In the ensuing confusion, Jeanne confesses her subterfuge, which causes Prefere to understandably react angrily. Embarrassed, Prefere ushers Jeanne back to the school, barring Bonnard from attempting to visit the young girl, to whom he becomes strongly attached.

Without permission, Bonnard travels to the school and, with Jeanne's wholehearted cooperation, whisks her away, with the intent of adopting her. Upon discovery of the girl's disappearance, Mouche realizes where she must have gone and goes to Paris to confront Bonnard. When he does, he offers to sell Jeanne's adoption to Bonnard, and for not pressing kidnapping charges, for a large sum of money. Wishing to get the girl out of her unfortunate circumstances, Bonnard agrees to the sale, but the only way he can raise the money is by selling his book collection. Distraught at the prospect of giving up his beloved books, but seeing no other way, sets up a time to complete the sale. However, Coccoz, a traveling bookseller with whom Bonnard is acquainted, shows up at the last minute and it is discovered that Mouche had stolen the rare book which had begun Bonnard's search in the first place. Not only has he stolen the book, but it is also found out that he had forged the original papers giving him custody of Jeanne.

With the tables turned, Mouche agrees to Bonnard's adoption of Jeanne, and forgoes any payment.

== Cast ==
- Anne Shirley as Jeanne Alexandre
- O. P. Heggie as Sylvestre Bonnard
- Helen Westley as Therese
- Elizabeth Patterson as Mlle. Prefere
- Etienne Girardot as Mouche
- John Qualen as Aristide Coccoz
- Trent Durkin as Henri
- Doris Lloyd as Mme. De Gabry
- Hilda Vaughn The Slavey

(cast list as per AFI database)

== Production ==
In March 1935 it was revealed that the title of the film, based on France's book, would be Chasing Yesterday, and that Anne Shirley was slated as the star. By the end of March, photography on the film had been completed, and editing had begun.

== Reception ==
Chasing Yesterday received mixed reviews upon its release.

Motion Picture Daily gave it a positive review, complimenting Nicholls' direction, calling it charming and touching. They complimented the acting by Shirley, Girardot, and Qualen, and offered particular recognition for Patterson, calling her performance "outstanding", and saying about Heggie, "Few screen performances have equaled Heggie's portrayal." The Motion Picture Herald also reviewed the film positively, calling it well directed, sentimental and interesting, and nicely juxtaposing comedy and drama.The Educational Screen, gave the film a good review, calling the direction expert and the acting fine. Overall, they called the film charming and humorous, and a "delightful adaptation" of the France novel.

Variety provided a less positive review, and wrote that although there is "charm" in the story, it appeared that the script was crafted more to showcase Anne Shirley, than for its "entertainment value" and "good direction cannot overcome the slowness of the early pacing." Harrison's Reports expressed a similar opinion, complimenting the direction and acting, highlighting Heggie and Shirley, while commenting that the screenplay was lacking: "The story, however, unfolds in such a tame, listless, and uninteresting fashion that one soon becomes bored and loses interest in the outcome."The Film Daily was also less than kind, calling it a "Fair sentimental drama handled in simple style."Modern Screen wrote the plot was thin and muddled, but that Heggie, Shirley, and Westley all gave good performances.
