= The Return of Peter Grimm (1935 film) =

1935 film directed by George Nicholls, Jr.

- Directed by: George Nicholls Jr. Doran Cox (assistant)
- Written by: Francis Edward Faragoh
- Based on: The Return of Peter Grimm, a play by David Belasco New York, 1911
- Produced by: Kenneth Macgowan
- Starring: Lionel Barrymore; Helen Mack; Edward Ellis; Donald Meek
- Cinematography: Lucien Andriot
- Edited by: Arthur Schmidt
- Music by: Alberto Colombo
- Production company: RKO Radio Pictures
- Release date: September 13, 1935
- Running time: 84 minutes
- Country: United States
- Language: English

The Return of Peter Grimm is a 1935 American drama film directed George Nicholls Jr. from a screenplay by Francis Edward Faragoh based upon the 1911 Broadway play of the same name by David Belasco. Produced by Kenneth Macgowan and released by RKO Radio Pictures on September 13, 1935, it stars Lionel Barrymore, Helen Mack, Edward Ellis, and Donald Meek.

Previously filmed by Fox Film Corporation in 1926 as a silent film, The Return of Peter Grimm.

A business owner disbelieves in the afterlife, until he dies and returns as a ghost. When he learns that his intended heir plans to sell the business, the ghost tries to sabotage the heir's arranged marriage.

== Plot ==
The owner of a thriving, generations-old nursery business, Peter Grimm is determined to marry off Catherine, an orphan he has raised to young womanhood, to his nephew Frederik. Catherine, who does not love Frederik, reluctantly agrees to marry him just to please her benefactor. Meanwhile, James, Grimm's secretary, is secretly in love with Catherine.

Grimm scoffs at his doctor and old friend, Andrew Macpherson, for his belief in the afterlife and seances, but after he dies, is chagrined to find his friend is right. As a ghost, he is disgusted when he finds his nephew is planning to sell the business to a despised longtime rival. Grimm tries to prevent the marriage he arranged.

== Cast ==
- Lionel Barrymore – Peter Grimm
- Helen Mack – Catherine
- Edward Ellis – Dr. Andrew Macpherson
- Donald Meek – Everett Bartholomew
- George Breakston – William
- Allen Vincent – Frederik
- James Bush – James
- Ethel Griffies – Mrs. Martha Bartholomew
- Lucien Littlefield – Colonel Tom Lawton
- Greta Meyer – Marta
- Ray Mayer – The Clown

== Critical reception ==
Andre Sennwald of the The New York Times commented, "There is no hint of irreverence in this new recital of the adventures of the old gentleman's spirit among his ungrateful associates", and suggested the film may have been more effective as a comedy, writing "Since yesterday's tears in the theatre are today's guffaws, "Peter Grimm" ought to be an excellent subject for a rowdy burlesque, especially if the great ghost sequence is managed properly." Sennwald noted the "effective performances" of Edward Ellis and George Breakston, described Lionel Barrymore as "a thoughtful blend of dignity and septuagenarian coyness", and commented, "Now that Helen Twelvetrees is absent, Helen Mack has no competition as the most lugubrious ingénue on the screen."

Variety offered a negative review in which they described the film as "sombre fantasy", and wrote that "as a drama it's pretty dull and boresome." They commented that Barrymore played without the "force" necessary for his role, Helen Mack "looking ghost-like and ephemeral, is stilted, prissy and neuter" and, as the dying child, George Breakston "instead of arousing sympathy is so artificial he almost becomes absurd." It concluded that if placed on a double-bill, the other film should be a comedy.
