= Too Young to Marry (1931 film) =

1931 film by Mervyn LeRoy

- Directed by: Mervyn LeRoy
- Written by: Francis Edward Faragoh (screenplay)
- Based on: play Broken Dishes by Martin Flavin
- Starring: Loretta Young; Grant Withers
- Cinematography: Sidney Hickox
- Edited by: John Rawlins
- Music by: Erno Rapee; Leo Forbstein
- Production company: First National Pictures
- Distributed by: First National Pictures (thru Warner Bros. Pictures)
- Release date: May 4, 1931
- Running time: 67 minutes
- Country: United States
- Language: English

Too Young to Marry is a 1931 American Pre-Code comedy film directed by Mervyn LeRoy and starring Loretta Young and Grant Withers, a married couple in real life, although it ended with an annulment. It was produced and distributed by First National Pictures. It is based on a 1929 play Broken Dishes by Martin Flavin.

It is preserved in the Library of Congress collection incomplete.

== Cast ==
- Loretta Young - Elaine Bumpsted
- Grant Withers - Bill Clark
- O. P. Heggie - Cyrus Bumpsted
- J. Farrell MacDonald - Dr. Horace Virgil Stump
- Richard Tucker - Chester Armstrong
- Emma Dunn - Jennie Bumpsted
- Aileen Carlyle - Mabel Bumpsted
