= James Bush (actor) =

American actor (1907–1987)

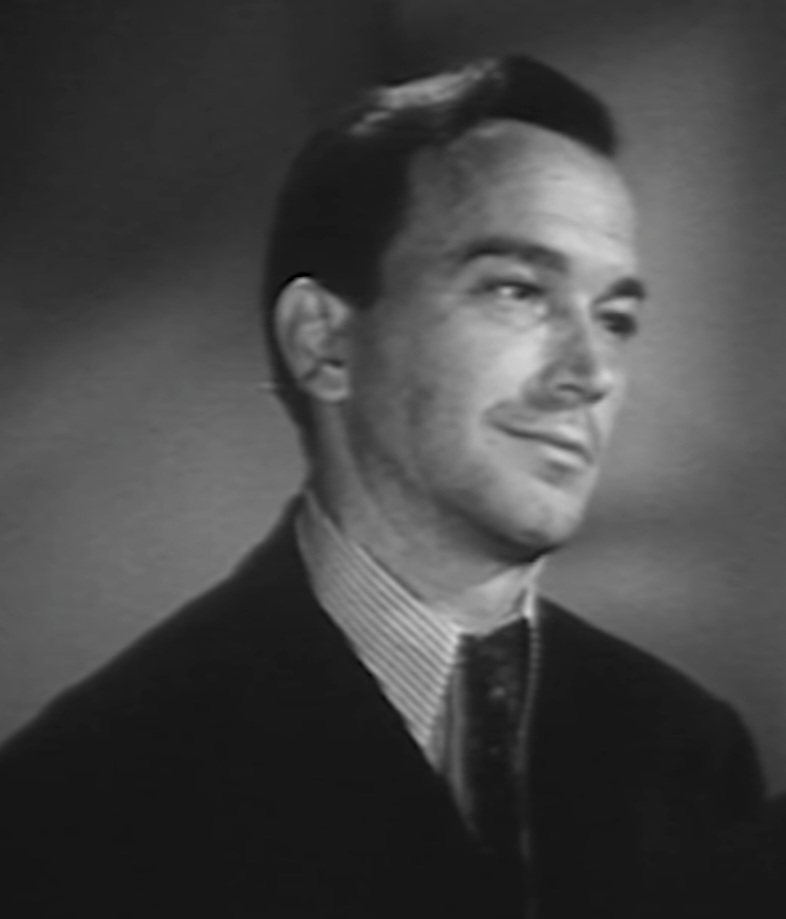
- Bush in Beyond Tomorrow (1940)
- Born: October 4, 1907; Greenfield, Ohio, U.S.
- Died: April 9, 1987 (aged 79); Van Nuys, California, U.S.
- Occupation: Actor
- Years active: 1930–1953

James Bush (October 4, 1907 – April 9, 1987) was an American actor from the 1930s until the early 1950s. He appeared in more than 100 television shows and films, more than 80 of them being feature films.

== Early years ==
The son of an actress, Bush moved to California with his mother and studied in a theatrical school and graduated from Los Angeles High School.

== Stage ==
Bush first appeared on stage at age four. When he finished high school he began acting with the Morosco stock theater company. He also acted at the Pasadena Playhouse for four seasons, spent one season in St. Louis, and performed with the Henry Duffy Players at the Hollywood Playhouse.

== Film ==
As a child, Bush appeared in some Paramount films that starred Mary Pickford.

While the Internet Movie Database has him appearing as a child actor in 1917's Jack and the Beanstalk, the American Film Institute has his first film role as Bent Weymer in 1932's Wild Horse Mesa, directed by Henry Hathaway, which was a featured part. During his career, Bush appeared in more than 80 feature films.

Although he appeared in many films in small, un-credited roles, he also appeared in featured roles in many notable films, including: as the adult Andrew Horn in The Great Jasper (1933); as Bill Radford in the 1933 drama, One Man's Journey; as Dick in the romantic comedy Young and Beautiful (1934); as Byron Coates/John Meseraux in the 1935 mystery, A Shot in the Dark; as Orin Tallant in the 1935 western, The Arizonian; as Arthur Pennyward in The Lady in Scarlet (1935); as Don Adams in the 1937 war film, I Cover the War!; as Johnny Eaton in the adventure film, Outlaws of the Orient (1937); as Henry Crusper in the 1939 comedy Joe and Ethel Turp Call on the President; as Ken Morgan in West of Cimarron, a Three Mesquiteers western (1940); as Joe Morgan in the Laurel and Hardy comedy, A-Haunting We Will Go; and as Hartman in another Laurel and Hardy film, The Big Noise (1944).

Occasionally, Bush would appear in a starring role: as Ralph Nelson in House of Danger (1934); and as Mark Twain in the 1937 western, Battle of Greed. Other notable films in which he appeared include: Ceiling Zero, a 1935 drama starring James Cagney and Pat O'Brien; M'liss (1936), starring Anne Shirley and John Beal; the 1937 drama, Internes Can't Take Money, starring Barbara Stanwyck and Joel McCrea; The Good Old Soak (1937), starring Wallace Beery; the 1937 mystery Night of Mystery; Sky Giant (1938), a drama starring Richard Dix, Chester Morris and Joan Fontaine; the W. C. Fields' comedy, You Can't Cheat an Honest Man; as one of the party guests at Twelve Oaks in the 1939 classic, Gone with the Wind; the 1940 fantasy Beyond Tomorrow; the Academy Award-winning war drama, Sergeant York, starring Gary Cooper; the 1943 Fritz Lang war drama, Hangmen Also Die!; the 1944 biopic about Woodrow Wilson, Wilson, starring Charles Coburn, Alexander Knox, Geraldine Fitzgerald, Thomas Mitchell and Sir Cedric Hardwicke; the 1947 docu-drama about the creation of the atom bomb, The Beginning or the End, starring Brian Donlevy, Robert Walker and Hume Cronyn; and the 1950 film noir, The Lawless, starring Macdonald Carey. Bush's last appearance in a feature film was in a small role in 1951's The Barefoot Mailman.

Bush also made infrequent appearances in film serials, such as Burn 'Em Up Barnes in 1934, and 1940's Mysterious Doctor Satan.Towards the end of his career, he made several guest appearances on television programs, including The Adventures of Kit Carson (1951), The Adventures of Wild Bill Hickok (1952), and Dragnet in 1953, which was also his last acting performance.

== Death ==
Bush died on April 9, 1987, in Van Nuys, California.

== Filmography ==
(Per AFI database)

- Wild Horse Mesa (1932) as Bent Weymer
- Central Airport (1933) as Amarillo Pilot (uncredited)
- The Great Jasper (1933) as Andrew Horn (adult)
- One Man's Journey (1933) as Bill Radford
- Crimson Romance (1934) as Fred von Bergen
- Young and Beautiful (1934) as Dick
- House of Danger (1934) as Ralph Nelson
- Beggars in Ermine (1934) as Lee Marley, Jim's Son
- Eight Girls in a Boat (1934) as Paul Lang
- The Merry Frinks (1934) as Oliver Gilfin
- Burn 'Em Up Barnes (1934, serial) as George Riley [Ch. 1] (uncredited)
- Against the Law (1934) as Bill Barrie
- Harmony Lane (1935) as Morrison Foster
- A Shot in the Dark (1935) as Byron Coates / John Meseraux
- The Return of Peter Grimm (1935) as James
- The Arizonian (1935) as Orin Tallant
- Freckles (1935) as Ralph Barton
- Strangers All (1935) as Lewis Carter
- The Lady in Scarlet (1935) as Arthur Pennyward
- Confidential (1935) as Lacey
- The Glory Trail (1936) as Lieutenant Dave Kirby
- O'Malley of the Mounted (1936) as Bud Hyland
- M'Liss (1936) as Jack Farlan
- Ceiling Zero (1936) as Buzz Gordon
- Absolute Quiet (1936) as Airport Radio Operator (uncredited)
- Crashing Through Danger (1936) as Eddie
- Internes Can't Take Money (1937) as Haines
- Battle of Greed (1937) as Mark Twain
- I Cover the War! (1937) as Don Adams
- Night of Mystery (1937) as Rex Greene
- The Good Old Soak (1937) as Tom Ogden
- Outlaws of the Orient (1937) as Johnny Eaton
- Sky Giant (1938) as Cadet Thompson
- I Am the Law (1938) as Law Student (uncredited)
- Come On, Leathernecks! (1938) as Dick Taylor
- Topa Topa (1938) as Jim Turner
- You Can't Cheat an Honest Man (1939) as Roger Bel-Goodie
- Joe and Ethel Turp Call on the President (1939) as Henry Crusper
- They Asked for It (1939) as Tucker Tyler
- The Family Next Door (1939) as Harold Warner
- Andy Hardy Gets Spring Fever (1939) as Bill Franklin (uncredited)
- Beyond Tomorrow (1940) as Jace Taylor
- Appointment for Love (1941) as Dr. Wade (uncredited)
- A Girl, a Guy and a Gob (1941) as Sailor Taking Address Book (uncredited)
- West of Cimarron (1941) as Dr. Ken Morgan
- You're in the Army Now (1941) as Lieutenant (uncredited)
- Sergeant York (1941) as Private (uncredited)
- So Ends Our Night (1941) as Herbert
- A-Haunting We Will Go (1942) as Joe Morgan
- Captains of the Clouds (1942) as Sergeant Pilot (uncredited)
- Iceland (1942) as Master Sergeant (uncredited)
- Sundown Jim (1942) as Ring Barr
- Hangmen Also Die! (1943) as Peacock
- He Hired the Boss (1943) as Clark
- Hers to Hold (1943) as Bomber Captain (uncredited)
- Jitterbugs (1943) as Henchman Jimmy O'Grady (uncredited)
- King of the Cowboys (1943) as Dave Mason
- Spotlight Scandals (1943) as Jerry
- Bomber's Moon (1943) as Radek - Czech Prisoner (scenes deleted)
- Air Force (1943) as Clark Field Control Officer (uncredited)
- Can't Help Singing (1944) as Cavalry Officer (uncredited)
- Call of the Jungle (1944) as Jim
- Shine on Harvest Moon (1944) as William R. Fowler (uncredited)
- The Big Noise (1944) as Hartman
- Wilson (1944) as Reporter (uncredited)
- Because of Him (1946) as Critic (uncredited)
- They Made Me a Killer (1946) as Frank Conley
- The Beginning or the End (1947) as Dr. Ernest O. Lawrence
- Out of the Past (1947) as Doorman (uncredited)
- Homecoming (1948) as Instructor (uncredited)
- The Man from Colorado (1948) as Cpl. Dixon (uncredited)
- Race Street (1948) as Male Nurse on Ward (uncredited)
- Massacre River (1949) as Eddie
- Armored Car Robbery (1950) as Control Tower Operator (uncredited)
- Convicted (1950) as Guard in Kitchen (uncredited)
- The Killer That Stalked New York (1950) as Hennick (uncredited)
- The Lawless (1950) as Anderson
- The Barefoot Mailman (1951) as Guard (uncredited)
- Chain of Circumstance (1951) as Office Help (uncredited)
- Never Trust a Gambler (1951) as Jim - State Trooper (uncredited)
- Saddle Legion (1951) as Gabe
