= George Nicholls Jr. =

American film editor and actor (1897–1939)

George Nicholls, Jr.
- Born: George Alberti Nicholls; May 5, 1897; San Francisco, California, United States
- Died: November 13, 1939 (aged 42); Los Angeles, California, United States
- Occupations: Director, editor
- Years active: 1928–39

George Nicholls Jr. (May 5, 1897 – November 13, 1939), also known as George Nichols Jr., was an American director and editor during the 1930s. Born to show business parents, and son of prolific actor and director George Nichols, he entered the film industry at the tail end of the silent film era, working as an editor for the Paramount Famous Lasky Corporation. After moving to RKO Pictures in 1933, Nicholls shortly began directing films by the end of the year. His career was cut short when he died in a car accident while driving to the location of his final film.

== Life and career ==
Born George Alberti Nichols on May 5, 1897, in San Francisco, his father was the American actor and director George Nichols, and his mother was the actress Viola Alberti. While his father was working at Biograph Studios, Nicholls made his film debut, acting in shorts during the 1910s. In 1912, as a child actor he had the lead in the comedy short Pa's Medicine at the Thanhouser Film Corporation, a film directed by his father.

He returned to the film industry behind the camera in 1928, as the editor on the Paramount film Wife Savers, directed by Ralph Ceder, and starring Wallace Beery, Raymond Hatton, ZaSu Pitts. For the next five years he worked primarily at Paramount as an editor. While at Paramount, he went by George Nichols Jr. When he moved to RKO in 1933, he began using the original spelling of his last name, and became known as George Nicholls Jr. His first film at his new studio was Sweepings, directed by John Cromwell. By the end of the year he was tapped to be an associate director to Thornton Freeland on Flying Down to Rio, the first film to team Fred Astaire with Ginger Rogers. The following year he would make his directorial debut, co-directing Finishing School with Wanda Tuchock (who was also directing her first film).

For the remainder of the decade, he worked consistently as a director at RKO, although occasionally loaned out to other studios such as Republic and 20th-Century. He directed several notable films, including: Anne of Green Gables (1934), starring Anne Shirley (who took her stage name from this point on from the character she portrayed in this film) and Tom Brown; 1935's The Return of Peter Grimm, starring Lionel Barrymore, Helen Mack, Edward Ellis, and Donald Meek; the 1936 sound remake of the 1918 silent film of the same name, M'liss, starring Anne Shirley again, this time with John Beal; and the 1939 Western, Man of Conquest, starring Richard Dix. Nicholls directed the retakes on the John Ford film, The Plough and the Stars in 1937.

In 1939 he was working on the action film The Marines Fly High. On November 13, while driving to the film's location shoot at Lake Sherwood, his car ran off the road on Coldwater Canyon Drive, killing him instantly. His sister-in-law, who was traveling with him, sustained non-serious injuries. Following a funeral service in Hollywood, his body was cremated.

== Filmography ==
(as per AFI's database)

Year	Film	Position	Notes
1915	The Making of Crooks	Actor	Role - Bob
1928	The Charge of the Gauchos	Editor	
1928	Forgotten Faces	Editor	
1928	The Port of Missing Girls	Editor	
1928	The Showdown	Editor	
1928	The Street of Sin	Editor	
1928	Wife Savers	Editor	
1929	The Dance of Life	Editor	
1929	The Dummy	Editor	
1929	Fashions in Love	Editor	
1929	Illusion	Editor	
1929	Interference	Editor	
1929	Illusion	Editor	
1929	The Mighty	Editor	
1929	The Mysterious Dr. Fu Manchu	Editor	
1930	Derelict	Editor	
1930	The Devil's Holiday	Editor	
1930	For the Defense	Editor	
1930	Seven Days' Leave	Editor	
1931	Rich Man's Folly	Editor	
1932	A Farewell to Arms	Editor	
1933	Ann Vickers	Editor	
1933	Sweepings	Editor	
1933	The Silver Cord	Editor	
1933	Double Harness	Editor	
1933	Flying Down to Rio	Associate director	
1934	Finishing School	Director	
1934	Anne of Green Gables	Director	
1935	The Return of Peter Grimm	Director	
1935	Chasing Yesterday	Director	
1936	M'Liss	Director	
1936	The Big Game	Director	
1936	The Witness Chair	Director	
1936	Chatterbox	Director	
1937	The Plough and the Stars	Directed re-takes	
1937	Portia on Trial	Director	Oscar-nominated for Best Music
1937	The Soldier and the Lady	Director	
1938	Army Girl	Director	
1939	Man of Conquest	Director	
1940	High School	Director	
1940	The Marines Fly High	Director	
