= The Marines Fly High =

1940 film by George Nicholls, Jr.

- Theatrical poster
- Directed by: George Nicholls, Jr. Benjamin Stoloff (as Ben Stoloff)
- Written by: Jerome Cady; A.J. Bolton; A.C. Edington (story)
- Produced by: Robert Sisk
- Starring: Richard Dix; Chester Morris; Lucille Ball
- Cinematography: Frank Redman
- Edited by: Frederic Knudtson
- Music by: Roy Webb
- Production company: RKO Pictures
- Distributed by: RKO Pictures
- Release date: March 7, 1940
- Running time: 68 min.
- Country: United States
- Language: English

The Marines Fly High is a 1940 action film, starring Richard Dix, Chester Morris and Lucille Ball and directed by George Nicholls, Jr. and Benjamin Stoloff from a story by A.C. Edington. (Note: During the production, George Nichols, Jr. was killed in a car accident. RKO had Benjamin Stoloff complete the filming as the new director.)

== Plot ==
In 1940, the Central American cocoa plantation owned by American Joan Grant needs protection from bandits led by El Vengador. She asks the Marines stationed nearby under the command of Colonel Hill for help. Lieutenants Danny Darrick and Jim Malone fly a mission to seek out the outlaws. Although they have orders to protect her, both men vie for Joan's affection.

John Henderson, the plantation foreman, is really El Vengador. He kidnaps Joan and sets a trap for the Marines he knows will try to rescue her. The two rivals eventually realize that to defeat the enemy, they will have to work together. When Malone is heading for an ambush, Derrick flies to his aid and rescues Joan.

== Cast ==
- Richard Dix as Lt. Danny Darrick
- Chester Morris as Lt. Jim Malone
- Lucille Ball as Joan Grant
- Steffi Duna as Teresa
- John Eldredge as John Henderson / El Vengador
- Paul Harvey as Col. Hill
- Horace McMahon as Sgt. Monk O'Hara
- Dick Hogan as Cpl. Ted Haines
- Kirby Grant as Lt. Bob Hobbes (as Robert Stanton)
- Ann Shoemaker as Mrs. Hill
- Nestor Paiva as Pedro Fernandez

== Production ==
Principal photography for The Marines Fly High took place from late October to December 2, 1939, on RKO sound stages. The backlots served as the locale for many of RKO's features set in more exotic locations. (Note: Lucille Ball would later purchase the RKO 40-Acres backlot as part of her Desilu Studios holdings.) The use of U.S. Marine aircraft and the ability of both Dix and Morris to look comfortable as pilots led an air of authenticity to the programmer.

== Reception ==
The Marines Fly High was a typical B movie whose action scenes received good notices from critics with Frank S. Nugent of The New York Times in a contemporary review, noting the film was "... a comfortably agile adventure story." A more recent appraisal by reviewer Frank Miller likewise described the film as "crammed" with action.

Film historian Richard Jewell in The RKO Story (1982), characterized the screenplay in The Marines Fly High by Jerry Cady and Lieutenant Commander A.J. Bolton as "dull" and "lacklustre".

Aviation film historian James H. Farmer in Celluloid Wings: The Impact of Movies on Aviation (1984) noted The Marines Fly High was punctuated by "the quick-paced roar of machine guns, rifles and airplane engines in this low-budget effort (that) fortunately leaves little time for a careful look at the lackluster plot."

== See also ==
- List of American films of 1940
