= Moonshine Valley =

1922 film

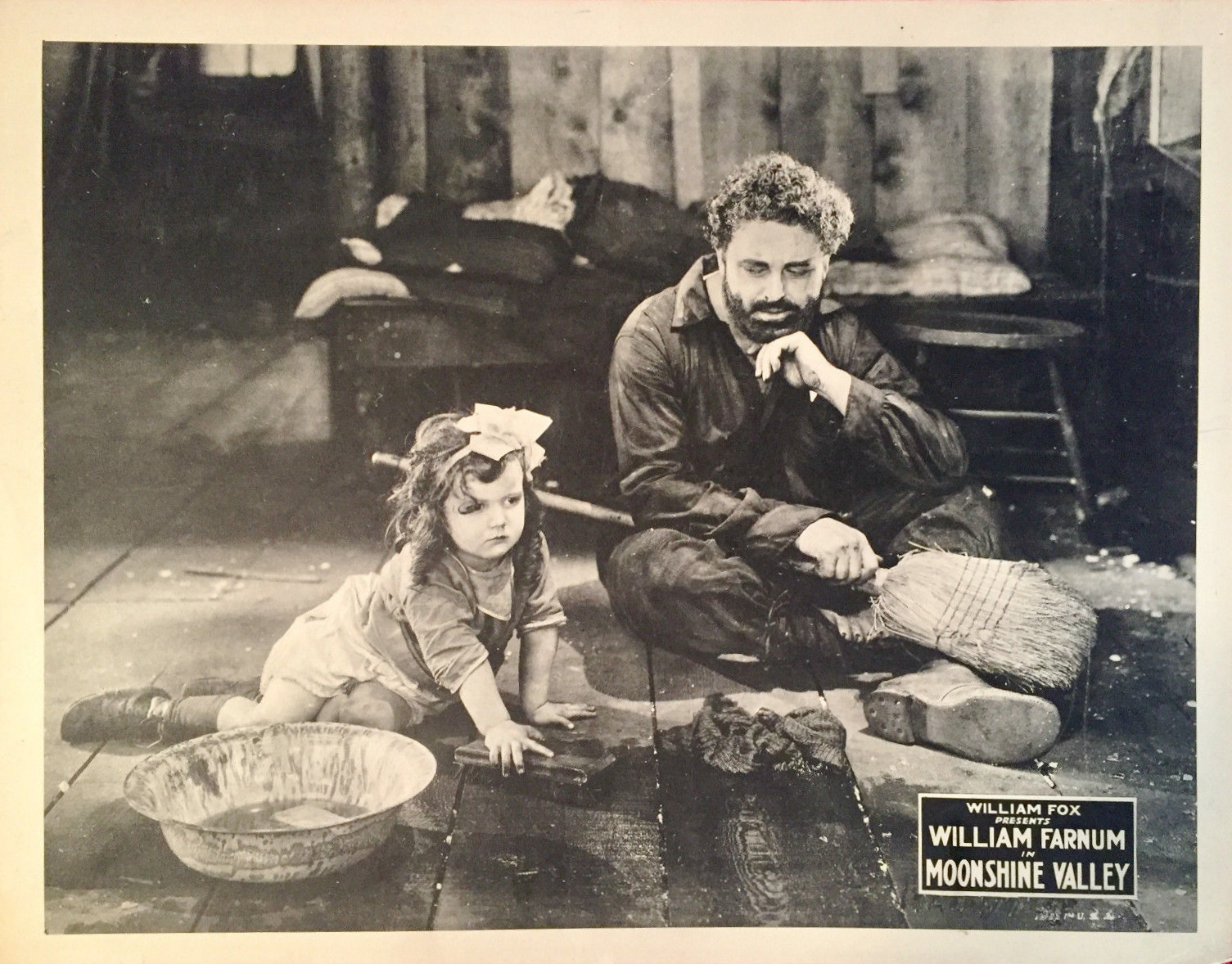
- Lobby card
- Directed by: Herbert Brenon
- Written by: Lenora Asereth (story); Mary Murillo (story & screenplay); Herbert Brenon (scenario/screenplay)
- Produced by: William Fox
- Starring: William Farnum; Sadie Mullen; Holmes Herbert; Anne Shirley; Jean Bronte
- Cinematography: Tom Malloy
- Production company: Fox Film Corporation
- Distributed by: Fox Film Corporation
- Release date: August 27, 1922
- Running time: 50 minutes
- Country: United States
- Languages: Silent; English intertitles

Moonshine Valley is a 1922 American silent Western film. Its working title was The Miracle Child: He Giveth and Taketh. It is not known whether the film currently survives, and may be a lost film.

== Plot ==
Ned Connors begins to drink heavily because his wife has left him for the local doctor. The man discovers a lost child and takes her in. The child soon becomes ill and the doctor is called for. Upon arriving, the doctor recognizes the girl as his own. When the doctor tries to take the girl away, Ned murders him. Ned and his wife reunite in order to take care of the now orphaned child.

== Cast ==
- William Farnum as Ned Connors
- Sadie Mullen as Mrs Connors
- Holmes Herbert as Dr. Martin
- Anne Shirley as Nancy (credited as Dawn O'Day)
- Jean Bronte as Jean the Dog

== Reception ==
One film exhibitor called it the "poorest excuse for a picture [he] ever saw."
