= You Can't Cheat an Honest Man =

1939 film directed by George Marshall

- Theatrical release poster
- Directed by: George Marshall; Edward F. Cline
- Screenplay by: Everett Freeman; Richard Mack; George Marion, Jr.
- Story by: Charles Bogle
- Produced by: Lester Cowan
- Starring: W. C. Fields; Edgar Bergen; Charlie McCarthy
- Cinematography: Milton R. Krasner
- Edited by: Otto Ludwig
- Music by: Frank Skinner
- Distributed by: Universal Pictures
- Release date: February 18, 1939 (United States)
- Running time: 79 mins.
- Country: United States
- Language: English

You Can't Cheat an Honest Man is a 1939 American comedy film directed by George Marshall and Edward F. Cline and starring W. C. Fields. Fields also wrote the story on which the film is based, under the name Charles Bogle.

== Plot ==
Circus proprietor Larsen E. Whipsnade is struggling to keep a step ahead of foreclosure, and clearly not paying his performers, including Edgar Bergen and Charlie McCarthy (Bergen's ventriloquist's dummy/alter-ego, whom Whipsnade hates). Whipsnade's co-ed daughter pays a visit and falls in love with Bergen, but after she sees the financial mess that her father is in, she decides to marry Roger, a tiresome young millionaire. Whipsnade initially approves of the marriage, and just to be sure that the penniless Bergen doesn't win out (and make McCarthy an in-law), he sets the pair adrift in a hot-air balloon. However, Whipsnade creates a scene at the engagement party, and father and daughter escape together in a chariot, with Bergen and McCarthy in pursuit.

Every time a performer is taken sick, Whipsnade must unconvincingly disguise himself and go on in the performer's place, This has him subbing for sword swallowers with tonsillitis, female sharpshooters with arthritis, and Bergen himself (with a false mustache to hide moving lips).

== Cast ==
- W. C. Fields as Larsen E. Whipsnade
- Edgar Bergen as Himself and the characters Charlie McCarthy and Mortimer Snerd
- Constance Moore as Vicky Whipsnade
- John Arledge as Phineas Whipsnade
- Eddie Anderson as Rochester (billed as Cheerful)
- James Bush as Roger Bel-Goodie
- Mary Forbes as Mrs. Bel-Goodie
- Thurston Hall as Mr. Bel-Goodie
- Grady Sutton as Chester
- Princess Baba as Herself
- Charles Coleman as Butler
- Edward Brophy as Corbett
- Arthur Hohl as Burr
- Blacaman as Himself
- Ferris Taylor as Deputy Sheriff
- Ivan Lebedeff as Ronnie

== Production background ==
The film's whimsical title comes from a line spoken by Fields about ten minutes into the film. Whipsnade says that his grandfather Litvak's last words, spoken "just before they sprung the trap", were: "You can't cheat an honest man; never give a sucker an even break, or smarten up a chump." The line expands on his character's comment to his daughter in the musical Poppy (1923): "Let me give you just one bit of fatherly advice: Never give a sucker an even break." (This is the title of a subsequent Fields film, made in 1941.) The character name is obviously a play on "larceny", a point which Fields reinforces at one point when someone calls him "Larceny Whipsnake".

The film features Edgar Bergen and Charlie McCarthy, capitalizing on the popularity of their ongoing radio "feud" with Fields.

According to historian William K. Everson, the film has three directors. George Marshall, the credited director, did not get along with Fields, so he worked mostly with the other cast members, while Eddie Cline was brought in to work with Fields, who had worked previously with Cline and liked him. (Cline in fact went on to direct Fields' next three films.) B. Reeves Eason was the second-unit director, helming the chase scenes and other action-oriented material.

== In popular culture ==
- Fields' character in this film would inspire the authors of the comic strip The Wizard of Id to create a shady lawyer character, a Fields caricature named "Larsen E. Pettifogger".
- Fields' character in this film also inspired the authors of the Lucky Luke comic strip, in the album Western Circus.
- A scene from the film is featured in the opening to Dummy (2002).
