= Susan Lenox (Her Fall and Rise) =

1931 American film by Robert Z. Leonard

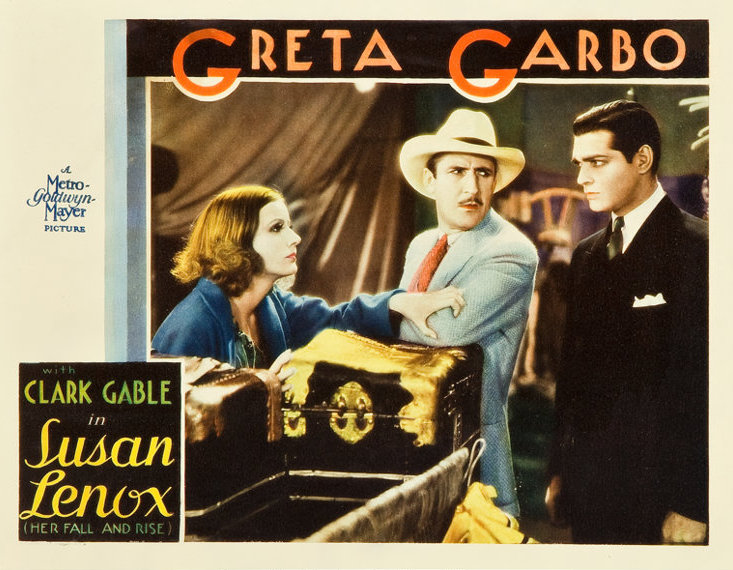
- Lobby card
- Directed by: Robert Z. Leonard
- Written by: Paul Bern et al
- Screenplay by: Leon Gordon; Zelda Sears; Edith Fitzgerald; Wanda Tuchock
- Based on: Susan Lenox: Her Fall and Rise; 1917 novel by David Graham Phillips
- Produced by: Robert Z. Leonard
- Starring: Greta Garbo; Clark Gable; Jean Hersholt; Alan Hale
- Cinematography: William H. Daniels
- Edited by: Margaret Booth
- Music by: William Axt; Leo F. Forbstein
- Distributed by: Metro-Goldwyn-Mayer
- Release date: September 10, 1931
- Running time: 76 minutes
- Country: United States
- Language: English
- Budget: $580,000
- Box office: $1.5 million

Susan Lenox (Her Fall and Rise) is a 1931 American pre-Code Metro-Goldwyn-Mayer film directed and produced by Robert Z. Leonard and starring Greta Garbo and Clark Gable. The film is based on a novel by David Graham Phillips. It is the only screen pairing of Garbo and Gable, who did not like each other. The notoriety of the novel alone caused British censors to ban the film's release. Following several edits, it was finally approved in the UK with a new title, The Rise of Helga.

== Plot ==
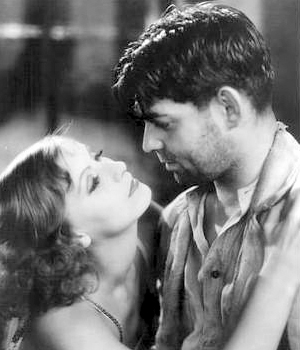
Greta Garbo and Clark Gable in Susan Lenox (Her Fall and Rise)

Helga Ohlin is an illegitimate child born and reared in an abusive home. Her uncle Karl Ohlin arranges for her to marry lout Jeb Mondstrum, but she flees and meets Rodney Spencer, an architect renting a cabin down the road.

When Rodney leaves the cabin, Jeb and Helga's father find her. She flees again and boards a train, where she meets a circus troupe. She joins them as a dancer and writes to Spencer asking that he meet her in Marquette, and she adopts the name Susan Lenox. While the police search for her on the train, the leader of the circus group Wayne Burlingham hides her in his quarters and then takes advantage of her.

Helga meets Rodney in Marquette, but they have a misunderstanding because of her indiscretions with Burlingham, and he leaves. She moves to New York and becomes the mistress of politician Mike Kelly. At a dinner party at Kelly's penthouse, Susan invites Spencer under false pretenses. When he arrives, they have another misunderstanding, and he once again leaves.

Susan is desperate and learns that Spencer has left his home, destination unknown. She vows to search for him, and eventually she lands in South America working as a dancer in a dance hall. She is romanced by American Robert Lane, who wants to marry her. But Susan longs for Spencer and vows to "rise or fall alone."

A barge with men working in the swamps arrives at the port, and they arrive at the dance hall with Spencer among them. Susan and Spencer meet, and after some arguing, they finally rekindle their relationship.

== Cast ==
- Greta Garbo as Susan Lenox
- Clark Gable as Rodney Spencer
- Jean Hersholt as Karl Ohlin
- John Miljan as Wayne Burlingham
- Alan Hale as Jeb Mondstrum
- Hale Hamilton as Mike Kelly
- Hilda Vaughn as Astrid
- Russell Simpson as Doctor
- Cecil Cunningham as Madame Panoramia/Pansy
- Ian Keith as Robert Lane

== Reception ==
In a contemporary review for The New York Times, critic Mordaunt Hall wrote: "It is in some respects quite an interesting production. There is Miss Garbo's compelling performance, splendid camera work and praiseworthy atmospheric effects, but the dialogue is often choppy and most of the incidents are set forth rather hurriedly. ... This film tells its story without much in the way of drama. Things happen according to schedule and one rather anticipates more than a few of the developments."

According to MGM records, the film earned $806,000 in the U.S. and Canada and $700,000 elsewhere, resulting in a profit of $364,000.
