= Road Demon =

1938 film by Otto Brower

- Film poster
- Directed by: Otto Brower
- Starring: Henry Arthur; Joan Valerie; Henry Armetta
- Distributed by: 20th Century-Fox
- Release date: December 2, 1938
- Running time: 65 minutes
- Country: United States
- Language: English

Road Demon is a 1938 American crime drama film directed by Otto Brower and starring Henry Arthur, Joan Valerie, and Henry Armetta. Footage from the Indianapolis Motor Speedway was included along with driver accidents. It is the second release in the Sports Series of films.

== Plot ==
After Tony Gambini and his family acquire a wrecked car, they fix it to use as a race car with Ted Rogers as the driver. Rogers competes against Skid, who was partially responsible for the death of Rogers' father at a race. During the last race, Rogers wins after Skid crashes into a wall after remembering Rogers' father.

== Production ==
The film is the second release in the Sports Series produced by 20th Century-Fox. The Memorial Day Speedway Classic at the Indianapolis Motor Speedway was filmed for scenes. Footage of well-known accidents that occurred at Indianapolis Motor Speedway was used in the film. A model of the track and nearby buildings were built in 20th Century-Fox's lot with the supervision of millionaire racer Joe Thorne. Associate producer Jerry Hoffman obtained four of Thorne's cars that were previously used in a classic race and worth $70,000. Hoffman received the equipment to work on the motors, a racing shell, and a chassis. Garages used at the 1938 Memorial Day races were reproduced for the film.

The film stars the fictional Gambini Family who first appeared in the first Sports Series film Speed to Burn. Speed Demon is the first starring role of Joan Valerie. The film was released with Five of a Kind as a double feature.

== Reception ==
Boxoffice Pro wrote that the film had "the best race sequences ever captured on film." Dorothy Masters of Daily News praised the newcomer actor Henry Arthur and said that "Henry Armetta, who plays the role of Papa Gambini for a second time, provides the film with most of its fun." Masters gave the film 2 1/2 stars. The Muncie Evening Press wrote, "Speed Demon has some exciting race sequences filmed at the Indianapolis track, showing America's fastest drivers, in action."
