= Joan Valerie =

American actress (1911–1983)

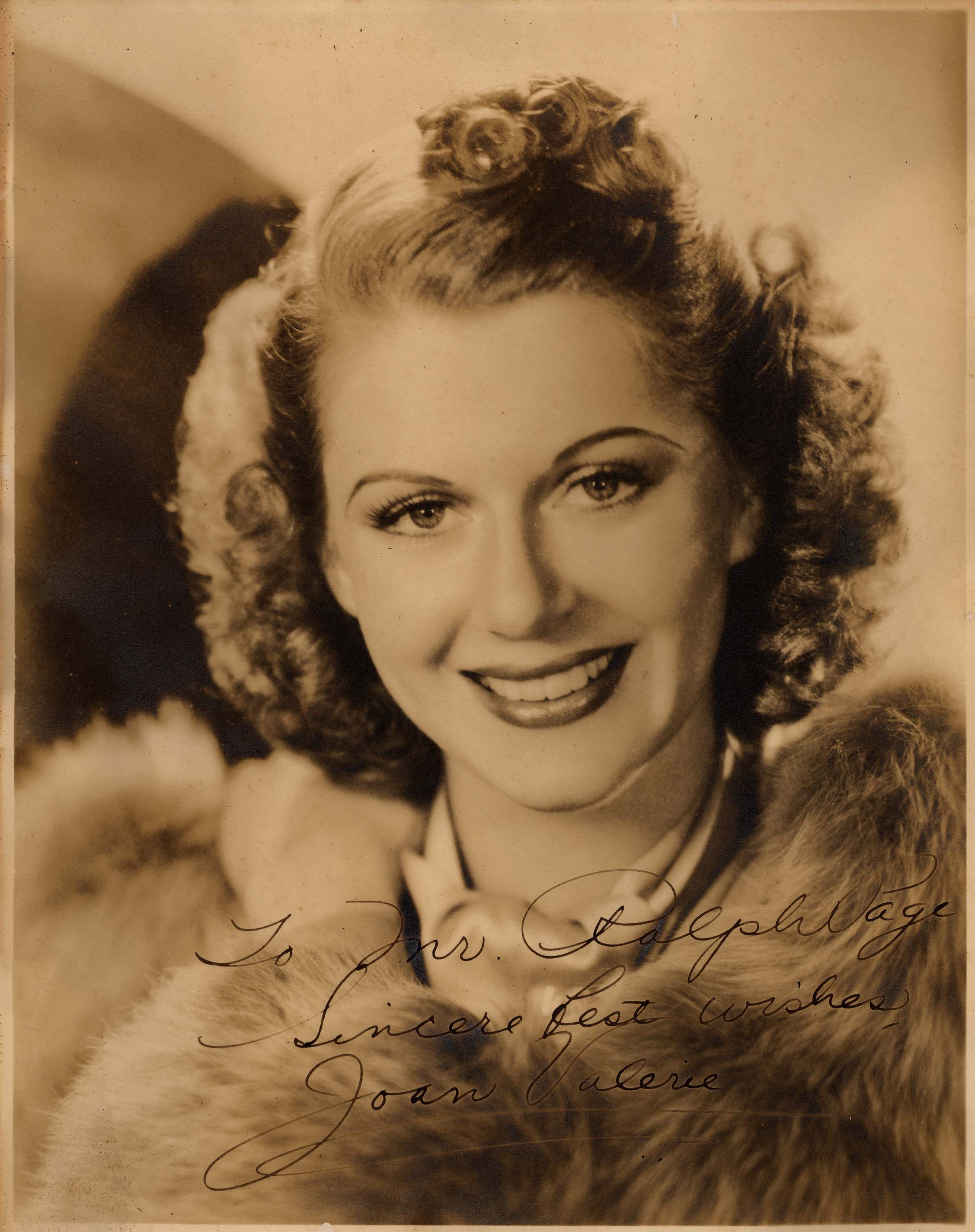
- Valerie in 1939
- Born: Helen Vlahakis; July 15, 1911; Sparta, Wisconsin, U.S.
- Died: January 30, 1983 (aged 71); Long Beach, California, U.S.
- Occupation: Actress
- Years active: 1935–1953
- Spouse(s): Paris Methusis Grant Richards (m. 1940; div. 1942)
- Children: 2

Joan Valerie (born Helen Vlahakis; July 15, 1911 – January 30, 1983) was an American actress, who appeared mainly in B movies in the late 1930s and 1940s.

== Early years ==
Born in Sparta, Wisconsin, Valerie was the daughter of Michael Vlahakis.

She was a 1931 graduate of Rhinelander High School. She participated in local play productions in her hometown and was active in theatrical productions at Morningside College.

In 1932, Vlahakis was runner-up for the title of "Miss Wisconsin."

In 1934, Vlahakis was selected from a group of 44 women as Morningside College's "most beautiful girl," Miss Morningside.

== Film ==
Valerie initially changed her name to "Helen Valkis" for acting purposes. She was discovered by Darryl F. Zanuck on stage at the Pasadena Playhouse.

In 1928, she was the leading lady in Yukon Trails, a Rex Pictures production that was filmed in Valerie's hometown, Rhinelander, Wisconsin, with an all-local cast.

Vlahakis's performance as the lead in Edward Elsner's Not So Long Ago in Hollywood led to two film studios' giving her screen tests, one of which resulted in a small part in Reckless (1935). After signing a contract (as Helen Valkis) with the Independent Productions film company in 1935, she received a contract from Warner Bros. in 1936. She played ingenues in two musical westerns with Dick Foran, and appeared in Confession, The Prince and the Pauper, Day-Time Wife, and Sergeant Murphy, among others.

Warners dropped her option after one year. In 1938 she freelanced, landing a role in a Gene Autry western and a lead in a low-budget animal adventure (for which she used the pseudonym Helen Hughes). That same year Twentieth Century-Fox chief Darryl F. Zanuck saw her in a play and offered her a contract. Under the new name Joan Valerie, she was featured in many of Fox's "A" and "B" pictures, including the Charlie Chan and Michael Shayne mysteries.

Fox curtailed most of its "B" productions in 1942 and released Joan Valerie. She accepted two assignments at RKO, and then withdrew from the screen temporarily. She resumed her movie career in 1947, freelancing again, and retired in 1953.

== Personal life ==
She was married to Paris Methusis and, in 1940, to Grant Richards. She and Richards, with whom she had a daughter, Jo-Ellen Rose, were divorced September 9, 1942. A newspaper report said that Valerie "sued under her true name of Helen Jaffe." She also had a son, George.

== Partial filmography ==
- Fighting Youth (1935) - Sorority Girl (uncredited)
- Ready, Willing, and Able (1937) - Switchboard Operator (uncredited)
- The Prince and the Pauper (1937) - Lady Jane Seymour
- The Cherokee Strip (1937) - Ruth Valley
- The Go Getter (1937) - Skinner's Secretary
- Blazing Sixes (1937) - Barbara Morgan
- Talent Scout (1937) - Ruth - Secretary
- Confession (1937) - Wanda
- It's Love I'm After (1937) - Autograph Seeker (uncredited)
- Alcatraz Island (1937) - Drake's Secretary (uncredited)
- Missing Witnesses (1937) - Simpering Girl (uncredited)
- Hollywood Hotel (1937) - Girl at Premiere (uncredited)
- Sergeant Murphy (1938) - Bess Merrill
- The Old Barn Dance (1938) - Sally Dawson
- Topa Topa (1938) - Margaret Weston
- A Trip to Paris (1938) - Marguerite Varloff
- Safety in Numbers (1938) - Toni Stewart (replaced by Iva Stewart) (uncredited)
- Submarine Patrol (1938) - Anne
- Road Demon (1938) - Joan Rogers
- Kentucky (1939) - Lucy Pemberton (uncredited)
- Tail Spin (1939) - Sunny
- Day-Time Wife (1939) - Mrs. Dexter
- The Man Who Wouldn't Talk (1940) - Miss Norton
- Young as You Feel (1940) - Bonnie Jones
- Free, Blonde and 21 (1940) - Vickie
- Lillian Russell (1940) - Lillian Russell's Sister
- Girl in 313 (1940) - Francine Edwards
- Pier 13 (1940) - Helen Kelly
- The Great Profile (1940) - Understudy
- Charlie Chan at the Wax Museum (1940) - Lily Latimer
- Murder Over New York (1940) - June Preston
- Michael Shayne, Private Detective (1940) - Marsha Gordon
- Jennie (1940) - Clara Schermer
- Who Is Hope Schuyler? (1942) - Phyllis Guerney
- Rio Rita (1942) - Dotty
- Just Off Broadway (1942) - Rita Darling
- Government Girl (1943) - Miss Jane MacVickers (uncredited)
- Around the World (1943) - Countess Olga (uncredited)
- Lost Honeymoon (1947) - Nurse (uncredited)
- The Hucksters (1947) - Receptionist (uncredited)
- Three Daring Daughters (1948) - Hostess (uncredited)
- Any Number Can Play (1949) - Minor Role (uncredited)
- The Skipper Surprised His Wife (1950) - Nurse (uncredited)
- A Life of Her Own (1950) - Party Guest (uncredited)
- Mister 880 (1950) - Cashier (uncredited)
- Roaring City (1951) - Irma Rand
- Father Takes the Air (1951) - Blonde
- Westward the Women (1951) - Flashy Woman (uncredited)
- The Girl in White (1952) - Nurse Hanson
