= Day-Time Wife =

1939 film by Gregory Ratoff

- Theatrical release poster
- Directed by: Gregory Ratoff
- Written by: Rex Taylor
- Screenplay by: Art Arthur; Robert Harari; Sam Hellman
- Produced by: Raymond Griffith
- Starring: Tyrone Power; Linda Darnell; Warren William
- Cinematography: J. Peverell Marley
- Edited by: Francis D. Lyon
- Music by: Cyril J. Mockridge
- Distributed by: Twentieth Century Fox Film Corporation
- Release date: November 24, 1939
- Running time: 72 minutes
- Country: United States
- Language: English

Day-Time Wife is a 1939 screwball comedy directed by Gregory Ratoff, starring Tyrone Power and Linda Darnell. Darnell and Power play Jane and Ken Norton, a married couple approaching their second anniversary. This was Linda Darnell's second film. Day-Time Wife was the first of four films that Darnell and Power made together over the next few years, the others being Brigham Young (1940), The Mark of Zorro (1940), and Blood and Sand (1941).

== Plot ==
Jane comes to believe her husband Ken is having an extramarital affair with his secretary Kitty. To give him a taste of his own medicine, Jane secretly takes a job as secretary to womanizing architect Bernard Dexter, who, unbeknownst to Jane, has a business relationship with Ken.

== Cast ==
- Tyrone Power as Ken Norton
- Linda Darnell as Jane Norton
- Warren William as Bernard Dexter
- Binnie Barnes as Blanche
- Wendy Barrie as Kitty Frazier
- Joan Davis as Miss Applegate
- Joan Valerie as Mrs. Dexter
- Leonid Kinskey as Coco
- Mildred Gover as Melbourne
- Renie Riano as Miss Briggs

== Production ==
Despite playing a married woman, star Linda Darnell was only 15 years old at the time of filming, having been born on October 16, 1923. Fox studio executive Darryl F. Zanuck added two years to her real age when he signed her to a contract.
