= M'Liss (1936 film) =

1936 film by George Nicholls, Jr.

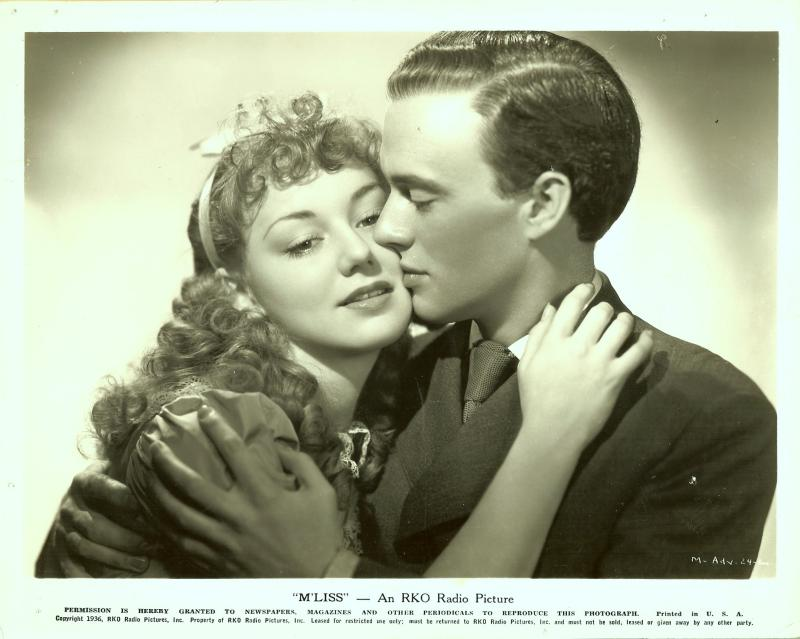
- Anne Shirley and John Beal
- Directed by: George Nicholls, Jr.
- Written by: Bret Harte (novel); Dorothy Yost
- Produced by: David Butler
- Starring: Anne Shirley
- Cinematography: Robert De Grasse
- Edited by: William Morgan
- Music by: Alberto Colombo
- Distributed by: RKO Radio Pictures
- Release date: August 7, 1936
- Running time: 66 minutes
- Country: United States
- Language: English

M'Liss is a 1936 American drama film starring Anne Shirley. The film was directed by George Nicholls, Jr. and based upon a Bret Harte short story. It is a remake of the 1918 film M'liss starring Mary Pickford in the title role.

== Plot ==
M'Liss is an innocent but rambunctious 17-year-old girl who was born and raised in the small town of Smith's Pocket. Her father Washoe Smith, whose briefly productive mining claim was both the source of the town's name and the reason for its existence, is now known among the people as the town drunk. M'Liss has to take care of him and works in a saloon washing glasses. They lose their home when Mayor Morpher demands it as the location of the new school. New school master Stephen Thorne encourages M'Liss to leave the saloon and go to school.

Her father is shot and killed while intervening in a saloon brawl. The now orphaned M'Liss is left in the guardianship of her father's friends, gambler Lou Ellis and the town barber Alf Edwards. When the mayor's wife Delia disapproves of M'Liss and tries to have her placed in an orphanage, M'Liss decides to leave Smith's Pocket. Stephen kisses M'Liss to persuade her not to run away. Told that a kiss is tantamount to a proposal of marriage, M'Liss is confused about what marriage is and asks for advice from heart-of-gold saloon girl Rose.

The Morphers' ne'er-do-well city cousin, Jack Farlan, drunkenly tries to take advantage of M'Liss but is rescued by Stephen. When he refuses to duel Farlan with pistols, because he is a crack shot and would have the advantage over the intoxicated Farlan, Stephen is accused by the townspeople of cowardice. Late that night Farlan is shot and Stephen is accused, although in fact it was Lou who shot him. Assuming that Farlan will die, the town prepares to lynch Stephen, but Farlan recovers and Lou admits shooting him. Stephen proposes marriage to M'Liss and her guardians happily give their blessing.

== Cast ==
- Anne Shirley as M'Liss Smith
- John Beal as Stephen Thorne
- Guy Kibbee as Washoe Smith
- Douglass Dumbrille as Lou Ellis
- Moroni Olsen as Jake
- Frank M. Thomas as Alf Edwards
- Ray Mayer as Whitey
- Barbara Pepper as Clytie Morpher
- William "Billy" Benedict as Archer Morpher
- Arthur Hoyt as Mayor James Morpher
- Margaret Armstrong as Mrs. Delia Morpher
- James Bush as Jack Farlan
- Esther Howard as Rose
