= The Old Barn Dance =

1938 film

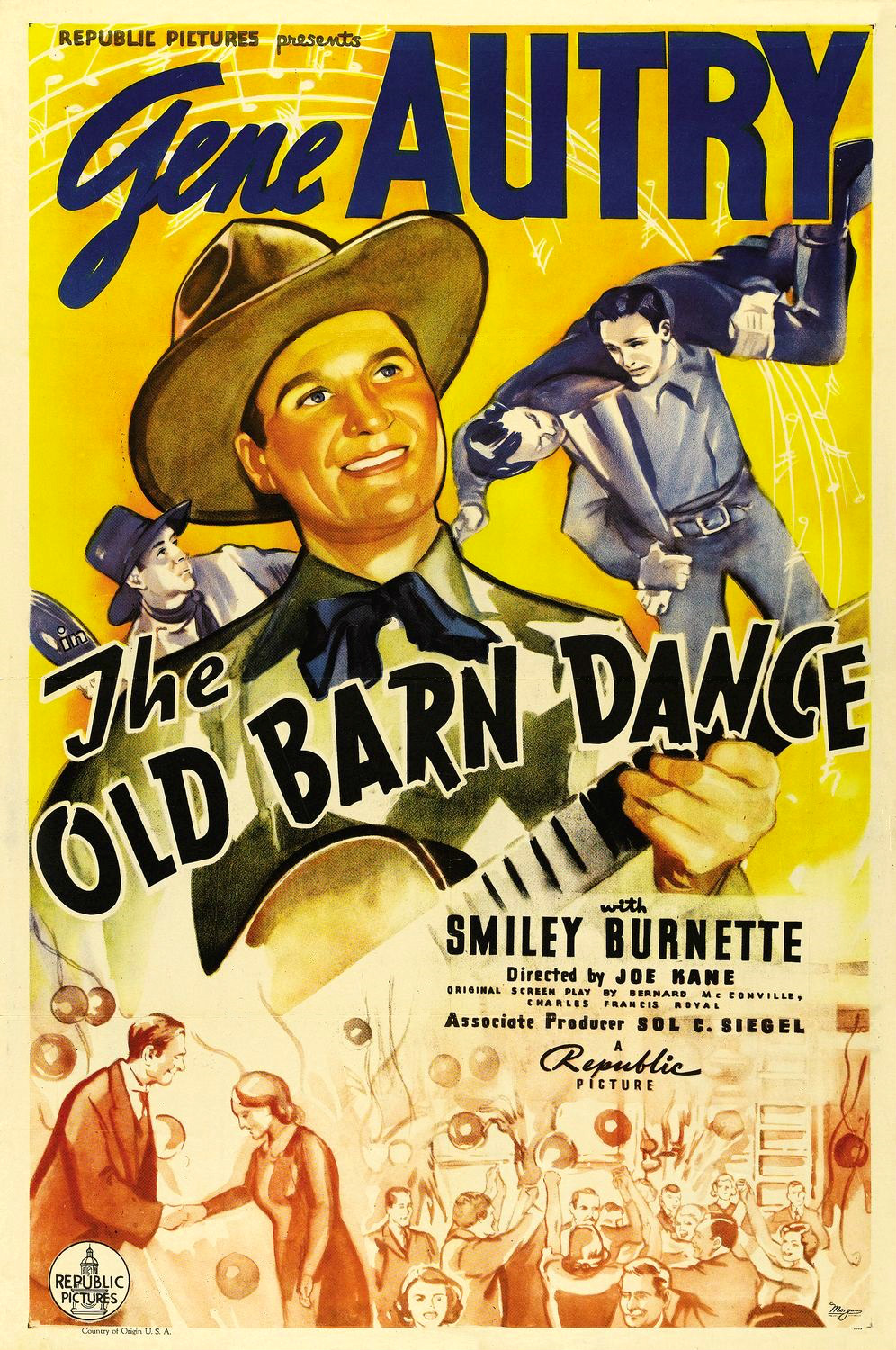
- Theatrical release poster
- Directed by: Joseph Kane
- Written by: Bernard McConville; Charles F. Royal
- Produced by: Sol C. Siegel (associate)
- Starring: Gene Autry; Smiley Burnette; Joan Valerie
- Cinematography: Ernest Miller
- Edited by: Lester Orlebeck
- Music by: Alberto Colombo
- Production company: Republic Pictures
- Distributed by: Republic Pictures
- Release date: January 29, 1938 (U.S.)
- Running time: 60 minutes
- Country: United States
- Language: English
- Budget: $49,191

The Old Barn Dance is a 1938 American Western film directed by Joseph Kane and starring Gene Autry, Smiley Burnette, Joan Valerie, and written by Bernard McConville and Charles F. Royal.

== Plot ==
A horse trader named Gene Autry (Gene Autry) arrives in Grainville with his horses and outfit prepared to put on a barn dance to attract potential horse buyers to an auction. The horse trading business has been affected lately by the increased use of tractors to replace horses for farm work. Radio station owner Sally Dawson (Joan Valerie) approaches Gene and offers him a contract to sing on a program sponsored by Thornton Farming Equipment, the area's leading manufacturer of tractors. Unconvinced that tractors could ever replace horses, Gene refuses her offer, but is still attracted to her and invites her to his barn dance that night.

Unknown to Gene, Sally is facing bankruptcy and needs to find a way to save the radio station. Knowing that Mr. Thornton (Ivan Miller), the tractor company owner, would sign a contract with her station if Gene would promote his product, Sally and her kid brother Johnny secretly broadcast Gene's show under the sponsorship of Thornton Farming Equipment. After hearing the broadcast and the audience reaction, Thornton agrees to give Sally an advance for Gene's upcoming shows, thereby saving the radion station. Later she tells Gene that if he signs a general contract with her, he would make enough money to offset his poor horse sales.

In the coming weeks, Sally broadcasts Gene's barn dances via remote control hook-ups, presenting them as promotions for the tractor company. The farmers of the area, believing that Gene is endorsing the use of tractors, begin to purchase them using loans from a finance company. As harvest time approaches, however, many of the farmers are unable to make their payments on time, and the finance company, conspiring with Thornton, threatens to repossess the tractors unless the farmers sign over a percentage of their harvest profits. The farmers are given less than a week to decide.

Believing that Gene is involved in the finance company's scheme, the farmers confront him at a barn dance and a major fight breaks out. Afterwards, when Gene learns the truth from Sally about how he has been used to promote tractor sales, he promises the farmers that he will provide horses to all of them to get them through the harvest. Meanwhile, Thornton demands that Sally return his advance payment since Gene will no longer be performing on the radio show. Fearing for her father's health and with no other option available, Sally agrees to broadcast recordings of Gene's barn dances to continue promoting the tractor company.

When Thornton learns that Gene and his men are rounding up horses for the farmers, he orders his henchmen to stampede the herd. During the stampede, a cowboy is seriously injured. Later, when the farmers hear Gene's voice on Sally's radio station, they suspect he has betrayed them, but when Gene arrives, they all realize they are listening to a recording. Angered by the deception, Gene heads over to the radio station with his sidekick Frog Millhouse (Smiley Burnette) and destroy the records, leaving the station in ruins. Later, Sally's kid brother Johnny is able to restore a record he made of Thornton discussing the stampede.

At the county fair, Gene arrives with his horses, but the sheriff seizes them based on Thornton's claim for damages to the radio station. While Frog uses a tractor to destroy Thornton's platform, Sally and Johnny broadcast the incriminating record of Thornton discussing the stampede over the public address system. When Thornton and his men arrive at the station, Sally and Johnny drive off, with Thornton in hot pursuit. Gene chases after the cars on horseback, shoots one of the henchmen, and captures Thornton. Afterwards, Gene and Sally head back to town together on horseback.

== Cast ==
- Gene Autry as Gene Autry
- Smiley Burnette as Frog Millhouse
- Joan Valerie as Sally Dawson
- Sammy McKim as Johnny Dawson
- Walt Shrum and His Colorado Hillbillies as Musicians
- Jo Stafford & Sisters as Trio of Comic Singers
- Maple City Four as Comic Singers
- Roy Rogers as Singer
- Ivan Miller as Mr. Thornton
- Earl Dwire as Clem Handley
- Hooper Atchley as Maxwell
- Ray Bennett as Buck, Thornton's Henchman
- Carleton Young as Peabody, Thornton's Henchman
- Frankie Marvin as Cowboy
- Earle Hodgins as Terwilliger
- Champion as Gene's Horse (uncredited)

== Production ==
=== Filming and budget ===
The Old Barn Dance was filmed from November 27 to December 9, 1937. The film had an operating budget of $49,191 (equal to $1,125,113 today). The film had a negative cost of $50,179 (equal to $1,147,711 today).

The Old Barn Dance was filmed on location in the Alabama Hills of Lone Pine, California, Kernville, California, and Red Rock Canyon State Park on Highway 14 near Cantil, California.

=== Stuntwork ===
- Art Dillard
- Buck Spencer
- Nellie Walker
- Fred Kennedy
- Ken Cooper (Gene's double)

=== Soundtrack ===
- "Ten Little Miles" (Jack Lawrence, Peter Tinturin) by Gene Autry, Smiley Burnette, Frankie Marvin, and Cowboys
- "Old Nell" (Frankie Marvin) by Smiley Burnette
- "Rocky Mountain Rose" (Joan Jasmyn, William Tracey, M. K. Jerome) by Gene Autry
- "Square Dance Call" (Traditional) by Roy Rogers
- "Eating Wax" (Abner Wilder) by Walt Shrum and His Colorado Hillbillies
- "She'll Be Comin' Round the Mountain" (Traditional) by the Stafford Sisters
- "At the Old Barn Dance" (Jack Lawrence, Peter Tinturin) by Gene Autry and auction attendees
- "At the Old Barn Dance" (Jack Lawrence, Peter Tinturin) by Gene Autry and cowboys at the end
- "Then and Now" (Smiley Burnette) by Gene Autry
- "Roamin' Around the Range" (Smiley Burnette) by Gene Autry with Sammy McKim and Smiley Burnette
- "The New Jassackaphone" (Richard Milburn, Septimus Winner) by Smiley Burnette
- "You're the Only Star in My Blue Heaven" (Gene Autry) by Gene Autry
- "The Tree in the Wood" (Traditional) by the Maple City Four
- "The Lady Wants to Dance" (Walter Hirsch, Lou Handman) by Gloria Rich
- "Old Chisholm Trail (Come a Ti Yi Yippee Yippee Yay)" (Traditional) by Gene Autry and Walt Shrum and His Colorado Hillbillies
