= O. P. Heggie =

American actor (1877–1936)

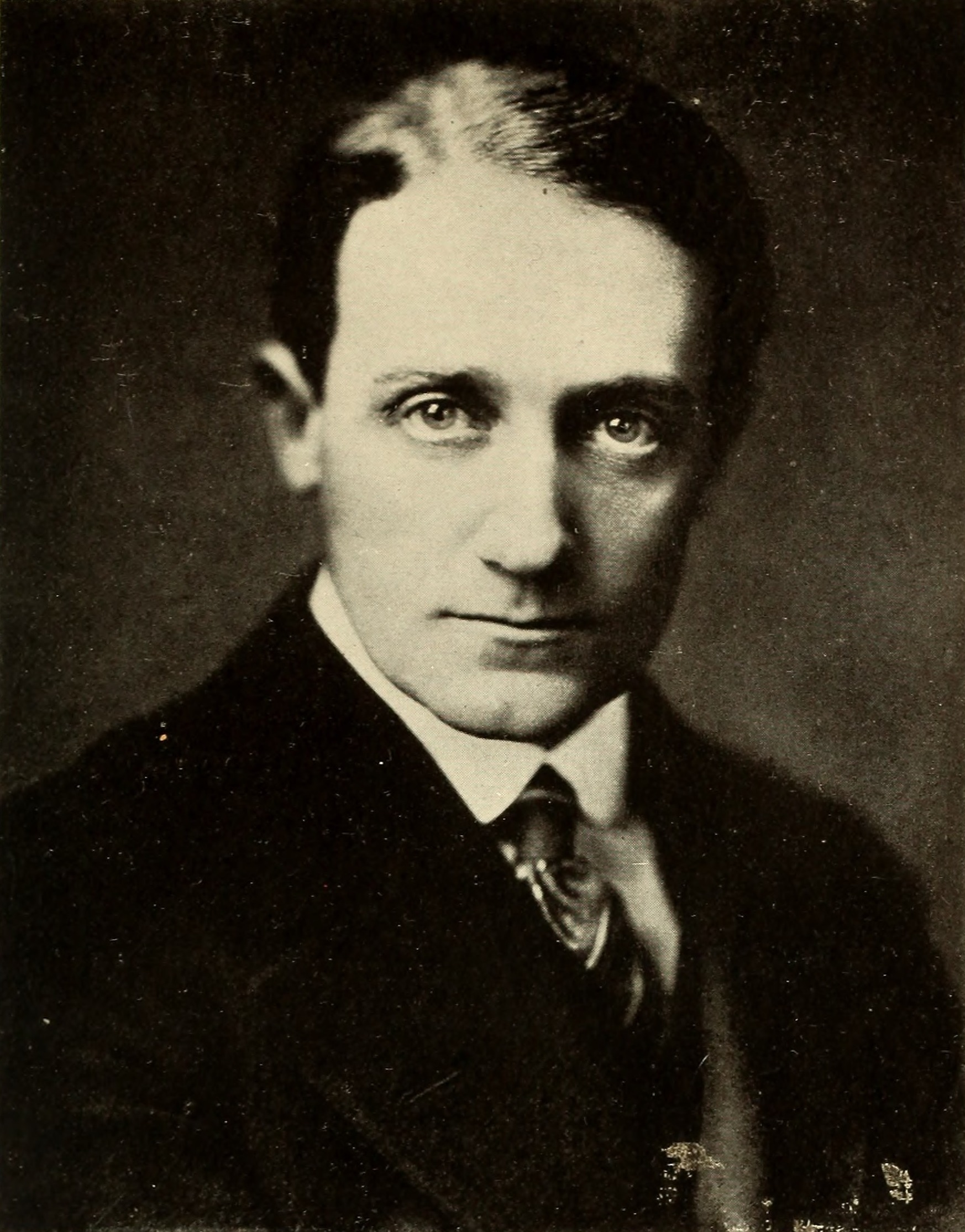
- Born: Otto Peters Heggie; 17 September 1877; Angaston, South Australia
- Died: 7 February 1936 (aged 58); Los Angeles, U.S.
- Occupation: Actor
- Years active: 1900–36
- Spouse: Lillian C (1885–1974)
- Children: 3

Oliver Peters Heggie (né Otto Peters Heggie; 17 September 1877 – 7 February 1936), billed as O. P. Heggie, was an Australian film and theatre actor best known for portraying the hermit who befriends the Monster in the film Bride of Frankenstein (1935). He was born Otto Peters Heggie at Angaston, South Australia to a local pastoralist. He was educated at Whinham College and the Adelaide Conservatoire of Music. He died in Los Angeles of pneumonia. He is buried at Woodside Cemetery in Yarmouth Port, Massachusetts.

== Career ==
Heggie appeared in local amateur dramatic companies before leaving his clerk position with the Union Bank, to pursue a career in acting and make his debut in Stolen Kisses in 1899 at the Theatre Royal, Adelaide.

He made his professional debut in A Message from Mars at the Palace, Sydney, in 1900. He later took the part of the messenger in the same play at the Bijou, Melbourne, and in the production that toured Australia and New Zealand under Walter Hawtrey. After appearing in productions of The Three Musketeers, Secret Service and The Christian, he left Australia in 1906 for England and was engaged firstly in a production at Margate on the Kent coast, before appearing on the London stage at the Criterion Theatre in a one-acter. He came to the notice of renowned actress Ellen Terry with his "Pippy" in the Lemonade Boy (October 1906). She hired him in January 1907 for her tour of America with Nance Oldfield (as Alexander Oldworthy) and Captain Brassbound's Conversion (Osman).

His subsequent London stage appearances included the part of Sam in Stingaree at the Queen's Theatre, and in 1909 the part of Henry French in The Strife, which performed matinees at the Duke of York's, and evening performances at the Haymarket. He also appeared as Julius Baker in George Bernard Shaw's Misalliance, as well as in Galworthy's Justice and in Pinero's Trelawny of The Wells. He played Sherlock Holmes in The Speckled Band, a portrayal much admired by Arthur Conan Doyle. His cabman in Haddon Chambers' Passers By of 1911 was praised also.

After playing Maximilian Cutts in productions of The New Sin at the Royal Court and the Criterion in early 1912, he took his own production to America. It played firstly on 15 October 1912 at Wallack's Theatre, New York. On 26 October 1914, he appeared at the same house as Uriah Heep in an adaptation of David Copperfield called The Highway of Life. In England, he appeared in J.M. Barrie's short play The Dramatists Get What They Want at the Hippodrome and took the lead in Androcles and The Lion (playing Androcles) at St James's. His Rev. Cyril Smith in G.K. Chesterton's first play Magic in 1914 at the Little Theatre was also highly praised.

Transferring to Broadway, he appeared in 1915 in the Man Who Married A Dumb Wife opposite Lillah McCarthy in its first presentation on an English speaking stage, reprised his role in Androcles, as Peter Quince in A Midsummer Night's Dream, and in Shaw's The Doctor's Dilemma. He followed by playing solicitor's managing clerk Robert Cokeson in Justice (1916), Oliver Blayds in The Truth About Blayds (1922), and Old Man Minick in Minick (1924). He took part in numerous revivals of classics ranging from Shylock in The Merchant of Venice (1918) to Diggory in She Stoops to Conquer in 1928.

In 1927, he was seen by Norma Shearer and her husband, producer Irving Thalberg, in the Players Club revival of Trelawny of the Wells. The couple persuaded Heggie to move to Hollywood, where he made his first film appearance in the silent film The Actress (1928) starring Shearer and based on the stage show. The film is now considered lost. Other Broadway appearances included Spellbound and Out of the Sea in 1927, The Beaux Stratagem in 1928, They Don't Mean Any Harm, and a revival of The Truth About Blayds in 1932. His later film appearances include as Louis XI in The Vagabond King (1930) and Anne Shirley's adoptive father in Anne of Green Gables (1934). His last work on Broadway was as William Owen in The Green Bay Tree (1933).

Heggie appeared in at least 27 films, including The Count of Monte Cristo (1934), The Letter, The Mysterious Dr. Fu Manchu, The Mighty, The Wheel of Life, The Bad Man, The Swan, Too Young to Marry, One Romantic Night, East Lynne (1931), Playboy of Paris, Sunny, Madame Jule, Devotion, Peck's Bad Boy, Ginger, and Smilin' Through between 1928 and his death in 1936.

== Partial filmography ==
- The Actress (1928) – Vice-Chancellor Sir William Gower
- The Letter (1929) – Howard Joyce
- The Wheel of Life (1929) – Col. John Dangan
- The Mysterious Dr. Fu Manchu (1929) – Inspector Nayland Smith
- The Mighty (1929) – J.K. Patterson
- The Vagabond King (1930) – King Louis XI
- The Return of Dr. Fu Manchu (1930) – Inspector Nayland Smith
- One Romantic Night (1930) – Father Benedict
- The Bad Man (1930) – Henry Taylor
- Playboy of Paris (1930) – Philibert
- Sunny (1930) – Peters
- East Lynne (1931) – Lord Mount Severn
- Too Young to Marry (1931) – Cyrus Bumpstead
- The Woman Between (1931) – John Whitcomb
- Devotion (1931) – Mr. Emmet Mortimer
- Smilin' Through (1932) – Dr. Owen
- The King's Vacation (1933) – Joel Thorpe
- Zoo in Budapest (1933) – Dr. Grunbaum
- Midnight (1934) – Edward Weldon
- The Count of Monte Cristo (1934) – Abbe Faria
- Peck's Bad Boy (1934) – Duffy
- Anne of Green Gables (1934) – Matthew Cuthbert
- A Dog of Flanders (1935) – Grandfather Jehan Daas
- Bride of Frankenstein (1935) – Hermit
- Chasing Yesterday (1935) – Sylvestre Bonnard
- Ginger (1935) – Rexford Whittington
- The Prisoner of Shark Island (1936) – Dr. MacIntyre (final film role)
