= Charlie Chan at the Wax Museum =

1940 American film

- Directed by: Lynn Shores
- Written by: John Larkin
- Produced by: Walter Morosco; Ralph Dietrich
- Starring: Sidney Toler; Victor Sen Yung; C. Henry Gordon; Marc Lawrence
- Cinematography: Virgil Miller
- Edited by: James B. Clark
- Music by: Emil Newman
- Production company: Twentieth Century-Fox
- Distributed by: Twentieth Century-Fox
- Release date: September 6, 1940
- Running time: 63 minutes
- Country: United States
- Language: English

Charlie Chan at the Wax Museum is a 1940 mystery film starring Sidney Toler as detective Charlie Chan. Revisiting an old case results in fresh deaths.

== Plot ==
Chan's testimony results in a death sentence for convicted murderer Steve McBirney (Marc Lawrence). However, he escapes and heads to a wax museum, a secret Mob hideout run by Dr. Cream (C. Henry Gordon). Cream, a crooked "facial surgeon", operates on McBirney, changing his appearance.

Chan is lured to the wax museum on the pretext of sparring over an old case with Dr. Otto Von Brom (Michael Visaroff) on a radio broadcast arranged by Cream. Based on Von Brom's testimony, Joe Rocke had been to be executed, but Chan is convinced that Rocke was innocent. In fact, it is all a setup so that McBirney can have his revenge, but Chan already suspects it. His son Jimmy (Victor Sen Yung) sneaks into the museum to investigate (without Chan's knowledge).

When everyone gathers at the museum, Carter Lane barges in, representing Mrs. Joe Rocke. His client also sneaks in. When the principals gather around a table to reenact a scene from the Rocke case for the broadcast, Cream makes sure Chan is in the seat wired for an electrocution. However, Von Brom insists on changing seats. Museum night watchman Willie Fern is tricked into throwing the switch. The lights go out, and Von Brom dies ... but not from electricity. (Lily Latimer, Cream's assistant, had cut the wire in an attempt to keep the museum's other function a secret.) Chan finds a small puncture wound in the dead man's neck and a bamboo blowgun dart.

Chan becomes certain that "Butcher" Dagan framed Rocke, his business partner, and that he killed Von Brom as well. Dagan was supposedly murdered by McBirney, another business partner and a friend of Rocke's. With Cream having operated on Dagan, no one knows who among those gathered at the museum is him (Jimmy even suspects Mrs. Rocke). Dagan kills McBirney and makes an attempt on Chan's life, before the detective finally unmasks and captures him.

== Cast ==
- Sidney Toler as Charlie Chan
- Victor Sen Yung as Jimmy Chan (as Sen Yung)
- C. Henry Gordon as Dr. Cream
- Marc Lawrence as Steve McBirney
- Joan Valerie as Lily Latimer, Cream's assistant
- Marguerite Chapman as Mary Bolton, a reporter
- Ted Osborne as Tom Agnew/"Butcher" Dagan, the radio program director and announcer
- Michael Visaroff as Dr. Otto Von Brom, a criminologist who puts his faith in scientific methods
- Hilda Vaughn as Mrs. Joe Rocke
- Charles Wagenheim as Willie Fern
- Archie Twitchell as Carter Lane, representing Mrs. Rocke
- Eddie Marr as Grenock, McBirney's bodyguard
- Joe King as Inspector O'Matthews
- Harold Goodwin as Edwards, the radio program's engineer

== Critical reception ==
A review of the film in The New York Times described it as an "eerie lark" that "would require a more than ordinary criminal dialectician to make head or tail out of the assorted and sinister monkeyshines crowded into" the film, and added that "Taken moment to moment the film has a chilling sequence or two, but don't ask too many questions of the plot."
