= The Mighty (1929 film) =

1929 film

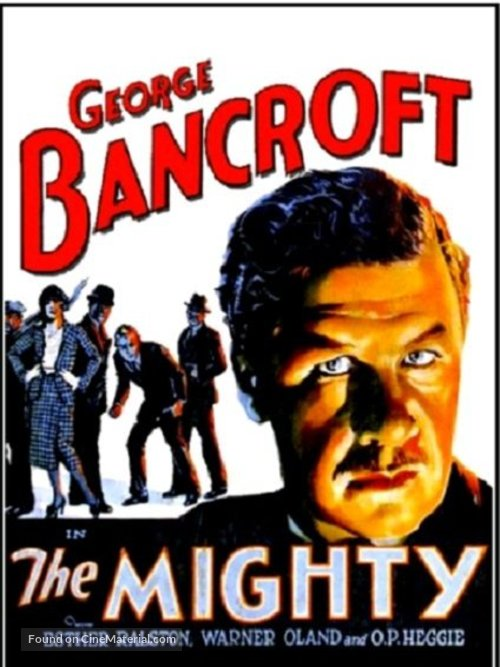
- Theatrical poster
- Directed by: John Cromwell
- Screenplay by: Grover Jones; Robert N. Lee; Herman J. Mankiewicz; William Slavens McNutt; Nellie Revell
- Starring: George Bancroft; Esther Ralston; Warner Oland; Raymond Hatton; Dorothy Revier; Morgan Farley; O.P. Heggie
- Cinematography: J. Roy Hunt
- Edited by: Otho Lovering; George Nichols Jr.
- Music by: Oscar Potoker
- Production company: Paramount Pictures
- Distributed by: Paramount Pictures
- Release date: November 16, 1929
- Running time: 75 minutes
- Country: United States
- Language: English

The Mighty (1929)

The Mighty is a 1929 American action film directed by John Cromwell.

The film was written by Grover Jones, Robert N. Lee, Herman J. Mankiewicz, William Slavens McNutt and Nellie Revell. It stars George Bancroft, Esther Ralston, Warner Oland, Raymond Hatton, Dorothy Revier, Morgan Farley and O.P. Heggie. It was released on November 16, 1929, by Paramount Pictures.

== Cast ==
- George Bancroft as Blake Greeson
- Esther Ralston as Louise Patterson
- Warner Oland as Sterky
- Raymond Hatton as Dogey Franks
- Dorothy Revier as Mayme
- Morgan Farley as Jerry Patterson
- O.P. Heggie as J.K. Patterson
- Charles Sellon as The Mayor
- E. H. Calvert as Major General
- John Cromwell as Mr. Jamieson
