= Hilda Vaughn =

American actress (1898–1957)

- Vaughn c. 1940s
- Born: December 27, 1898; Baltimore, Maryland, U.S.
- Died: December 28, 1957 (aged 59); Baltimore, Maryland, U.S.
- Education: Vassar College; American Academy of Dramatic Arts
- Occupation: Actress
- Years active: 1929–1950

Hilda Vaughn (born Hilda Weiller Strouse; December 27, 1898 – December 28, 1957) was an American actress of the stage, film, radio, and television.

== Early years ==
Born Hilda Weiller Strouse, Vaughn was the daughter of Mr. and Mrs. Eli Strouse, Vaughn attended Vassar College and the American Academy of Dramatic Arts.

== Career ==
Vaughn frequently played a "pleb", or a commoner, in the films she acted in (waitresses, maids, charwomen, governesses, and saleswomen). A fixture at MGM in the sound era of the early 1930s, she acted in more than 50 films. Her most notable films were 1933's Dinner at Eight where she was memorable as Jean Harlow's blackmailing maid, as well as Today We Live (1933), Chasing Yesterday (1935), and Charlie Chan at the Wax Museum (1940).

She appeared on Broadway, and in 1924 toured as the lead in Rain based on a story by W. Somerset Maugham. Her "smoldering quality" came back to Broadway two years later in The Seed of the Brute at the Little Theatre. She also appeared on Broadway in Glory Hallelujah.

After making several films, Vaughn was part of the Hollywood blacklist. She returned to the stage in 1942 to play the lead in Only the Heart at the American Actors Company. In 1943 she appeared in William Saroyan's Get Away Old Man, followed by several other appearances, including playing the nurse to Judith Anderson's Medea and the mother in The Devil's Disciple by George Bernard Shaw. She was also known for her concert readings of plays.

== Death ==
On December 28, 1957, Vaughn died in Baltimore.

== Filmography ==
- Three Live Ghosts (1929) - Peggy Woofers
- Manslaughter (1930) - Louise Evans
- A Tailor Made Man (1931) - (uncredited)
- It's a Wise Child (1931) - Alice Peabody
- Susan Lenox (Her Fall and Rise) (1931) - Astrid Ohlin
- Ladies of the Big House (1931) - Millie
- The Phantom of Crestwood (1932) - Mrs. Carter
- No Other Woman (1933) - Miss LeRoy - Governess
- Today We Live (1933) - Eleanor
- No Marriage Ties (1933) - Fanny Olmstead, Foster's Secretary
- Dinner at Eight (1933) - Tina
- Anne of Green Gables (1934) - Mrs. Blewett
- The Wedding Night (1935) - Hezzie Jones
- Straight from the Heart (1935) - Miss Nellie
- Chasing Yesterday (1935) - Collette - the Slavey (uncredited)
- Men Without Names (1935) - Nurse Simpson
- I Live My Life (1935) - Miss Ann Morrison
- The Trail of the Lonesome Pine (1936) - Gaptown Teacher (uncredited)
- Everybody's Old Man (1936) - Maid
- Gentle Julia (1936) - Telephone Operator (uncredited)
- Captain January (1936) - Dress Saleswoman (uncredited)
- The Witness Chair (1936) - Anna Yifnick (uncredited)
- Half Angel (1936) - Bertha
- And Sudden Death (1936) - Prison Inmate (uncredited)
- The Accusing Finger (1936) - Maid
- Charlie Chan at the Opera (1936) - Agnes - Wardrobe Woman (uncredited)
- Banjo On My Knee (1936) - Gurtha
- Danger – Love at Work (1937) - Pemberton's Maid
- Nothing Sacred (1937) - Mrs. Cartwright - Chief Ranger (uncredited)
- Maid's Night Out (1938) - Mary - Harrison's Maid
- Charlie Chan at the Wax Museum (1940) - Mrs. Rocke
- Confirm or Deny (1941) - Receptionist (scenes deleted)
