= Hat, Coat, and Glove =

1934 film directed by Worthington Miner

Hat, Coat and Glove
- Directed by: Worthington Miner; C. C. Thompson (assistant)
- Written by: Francis Faragoh (screenplay) adapted from the play by Wilhelm Speyer
- Produced by: Pandro S. Berman; Kenneth Macgowan (associate)
- Starring: Ricardo Cortez; Barbara Robbins; John Beal
- Cinematography: J. Roy Hunt
- Edited by: Ralph Dietrich
- Music by: Max Steiner
- Production company: RKO Radio Pictures
- Release dates: June 26, 1934 (Premiere-New York City); June 27, 1934 (US)
- Running time: 66 minutes
- Country: United States
- Language: English

Hat, Coat and Glove is a 1934 American pre-Code crime drama film directed by Worthington Miner from a screenplay by Francis Faragoh. It starred Ricardo Cortez, Barbara Robbins, and John Beal.

The play was filmed again in 1944 as A Night of Adventure.

== Cast ==
- Ricardo Cortez as Robert Mitchell
- Barbara Robbins as Dorothea Mitchell
- John Beal as Jerry Hutchins
- Dorothy Burgess as Ann Brewster
- Paul Harvey as The Prosecuting Attorney
- Sara Haden as The Secretary
- Margaret Hamilton as Madame Du Barry
- David Durand as Thomas Sullivan
- Murray Kinnell as The Judge
- Fred Sullivan as The Court Clerk
- Gayle Evers as The Saleslady
