= Today We Live =

1933 film by Howard Hawks, Richard Rosson

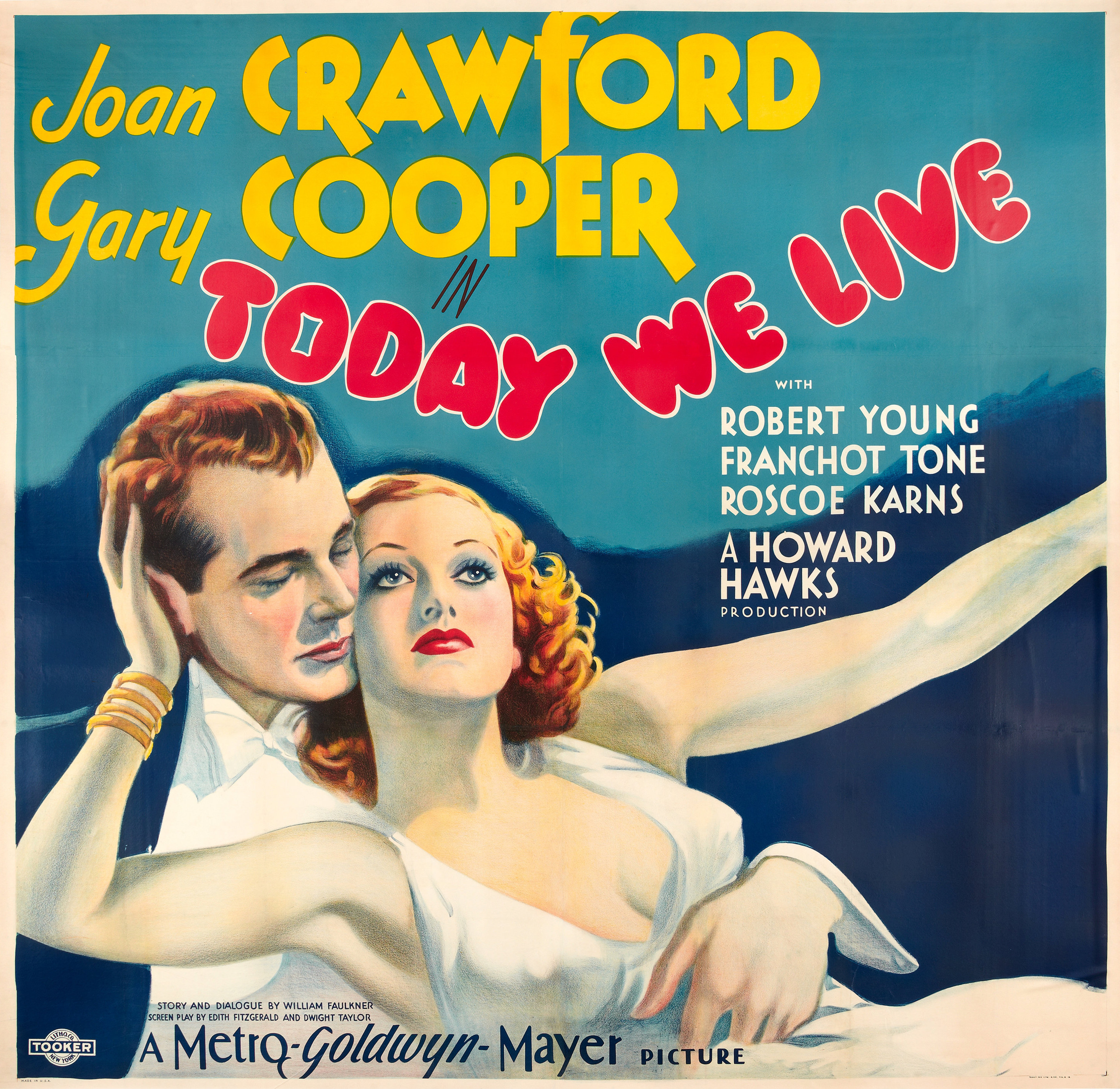
- Theatrical release poster
- Directed by: Howard Hawks
- Written by: William Faulkner (dialogue)
- Screenplay by: Edith Fitzgerald; Dwight Taylor
- Based on: Turn About; Saturday Evening Post 1932 by William Faulkner
- Produced by: Howard Hawks
- Starring: Joan Crawford; Gary Cooper; Robert Young; Franchot Tone
- Cinematography: Oliver T. Marsh; Elmer Dyer (aerial photography)
- Edited by: Edward Curtiss
- Production company: Metro-Goldwyn-Mayer
- Distributed by: Loew's Inc.
- Release date: April 21, 1933 (US)
- Running time: 113 minutes
- Country: United States
- Language: English
- Budget: $663,000
- Box office: $1,035,000

Today We Live is a 1933 American pre-Code romance drama film produced and directed by Howard Hawks and starring Joan Crawford, Gary Cooper, Robert Young and Franchot Tone.

Based on the story "Turnabout" by William Faulkner, which appeared in the Saturday Evening Post on March 5, 1932, the film is about two officers during World War I, who compete for the same beautiful young woman. Faulkner provided dialogue for the film, making it the only film version of his work that Faulkner co-wrote.

Joan Crawford's character was added to the film to include a love interest. She met her future husband Franchot Tone on the set of the film. They married two years later.

== Plot ==
During World War I, Diana "Ann" Boyce-Smith is an English girl living on her father's estate in Kent. The estate is bought by a wealthy American, Richard Bogard, who seeks to move into his new property. Right as Bogard arrives, Ann and the house's servants find out that her father has been killed in action, but Ann projects calm and brave graciousness and moves to the guest cottage without complaint. Bogard finds her strength attractive and quickly falls in love with her.

Meanwhile, her brother Lt. Ronnie Boyce-Smith and Lt. Claude Hope are both British Naval officers going off to fight in the war. Ann believes she is in love with Claude, and consents to marry him. However, she soon realizes she is in true love when meeting Bogard. Though Bogard originally proclaimed his neutrality and indifference to the war, he soon joins as a fighter pilot. Ann goes to London, and though Claude is unaware of Diana's true feelings for Bogard, Ann admits her feelings for Bogard to Ronnie. Ronnie advises her to tell Claude the truth, but Ann is intent on keeping her marriage pledge. Then Ronnie shows an announcement in the paper informing her that Bogard was reported dead during a training accident.

However, there had been a mistake, and Bogard comes back unharmed. Though she is happy to see him, she disappears soon after he arrives. Bogard comes across a drunken Claude in a bar and takes him home—a home he shares with Ann. Bogard becomes jealous, and a rivalry for Ann develops between Bogard and Claude. Claude agrees to accompany Bogard on an air fight, and Bogard is surprised by Claude's expert shooting. Bogard takes a turn at Claude's shift on a boat, and Claude is blinded when hand-launching a torpedo against a German battleship.

Ann learns of Claude's blindness and says a final goodbye to Bogard, but he realizes Diana and Bogard's true feelings for one another. Diana feels it is her duty to care for Claude, and when an aerial suicide mission comes up, all three men participate, with the outcome being that both Claude and Ronnie die in action, although their boat successfully makes a torpedo run. Their sacrifice allows Bogard to survive, and although Diana is sad to lose both Ronnie and Claude, she and Bogard are reunited.

== Cast ==
As appearing in Today We Live (main roles and screen credits identified):

- Joan Crawford as Diana "Ann" Boyce
- Gary Cooper as Lieutenant Richard Bogard
- Robert Young as Lieutenant Claude Hope
- Franchot Tone as Lieutenant Ronnie Boyce-Smith
- Roscoe Karns as "Mac" McGinnis
- Louise Closser Hale as Applegate
- Hilda Vaughn as Eleanor
- Eily Malyon as the Maid

A combination of model work and live action photography made for convincing aerial sequences.

== Production ==
With the working titles, "We Live Again" and "Turn About", Howard Hawks purchased an option on Faulkner's short story, "Turnabout" of men in combat as a star vehicle for Phillips Holmes, Charles "Buddy" Rogers, and later, Clark Gable. Faulkner took only five days to write the film himself, but when Irving Thalberg, the vice-president of MGM studios at the time, insisted that Crawford be written into the script as she was contractually committed to a $500,000 salary, working or not, the first of many rewrites began. (Note: Thalberg interfered with Today We Live as "the studio simply had to put her (Crawford) to work or lose money." A further complication was that Tallulah Bankhead, the original star, had balked at the role.) Faulkner created the role of Ann, who was involved in a love triangle. Hawks hated the studio interference in what he considered would have been a "man's picture", but found working with Crawford was pleasant. Although touted as a classic screen pairing, Today We Live was the only time Joan Crawford and Gary Cooper performed together. MGM marketed the film as a romance with the trailer focusing on the two stars, gushing on screen with the taglines, "The fiery head-strong personality of exquisite Joan Crawford" and "The calm strength, the eager romantic nature of handsome Gary Cooper."

Once Crawford was signed, an effort to go for a similar star name led to Cooper coming on board, on loan from Paramount two weeks after the projected date of principal photography, although some sources indicate that Cooper, Robert Young and Franchot Tone were Hawks' first choices. Press releases had touted that Crawford had insisted on Cooper as her co-star. Cooper was in a slight decline with two other "mediocre" films in release, and when the opportunity to work with Hawks came, it also aligned him with the mercurial Crawford, albeit in what he later would regard as a "misguided project". (Note: Crawford fretted that not only was she forced into the film but it required her to master a British accent which she felt was not altogether successful. Reviewers called it "dreadful".) A series of rewrites with both Faulkner and other screenwriters along with the cutting of key opening scenes led to a confusing jumble of versions, as the original screen time of 135 minutes of a preview print indicates.

After obtaining General Douglas MacArthur's help in reserving March Field in California, individual aerial sequences were shot although footage from Howard Hughes' Hell's Angels (1930) including the bomber mission, the "dogfight" sequence complete with the head-on collision of two aircraft, was merged into the final production print. Principal photography in both Culver City studio and location sites began in mid-December 1932 and wrapped in February 1933. After looking at rushes of the young actors that were integral to the background of the film, it was evident that their British accents were completely unconvincing and Hawks resorted to excising their scenes altogether and entering a new rewrite, focusing more heavily on Crawford's character, with no better results. The upper-class dialogue that once was considered "snappy" now appeared to be "Hemingwayesque" and combined with the ludicrous period outfits worn by the cast, especially Crawford's outlandish gowns, made it difficult for cast members to not consider the entire exercise a farce. (Note: Actors such as Cooper, wore their own 1933 styled clothing in complete contrast to what was to be a World War I setting. The enormous collar worn by Crawford "stuck in everybody's eye.")

== Reception ==
Although well received in a preview, Today We Live was a very different film in its final release form, and was almost universally panned, with Variety having a litany of complaints: "... the film was 20 minutes too long. Crawford was unconvincing, Hawks used too much aerial footage from 'Hell's Angels' (1930), the "Gowns by Adrian" were extreme and annoying, and the story was superficial ... " Mordant Hall in his review for The New York Times, was less strident, but noted the film was "at times vague and cumbersome. It possesses, however, the spark of sincerity, and its lack of clarity might be ascribed either to Howard Hawks's direction or to the script contributed by Edith Fitzgerald and Dwight Taylor, for there are sequences that are far too lengthy and others that would be considerably improved by more detail." A modern assessment was similarly damning, "... the melodrama is more clinging than the mud of the Marne."

=== Box office ===
According to MGM records the film earned $590,000 in the US and Canada and $445,000 elsewhere resulting in a loss of $23,000.
