= Topa Topa =

1938 film

- Directed by: Charles Hutchison; Vin Moore
- Written by: Charles Diltz; Hilda May Young
- Produced by: William M. Vogel
- Starring: Joan Valerie; James Bush; LeRoy Mason
- Cinematography: Robert Doran
- Edited by: Charles Diltz
- Music by: Edward Kilenyi
- Production company: Franklyn Warner Productions
- Distributed by: Pennant Pictures; Grand National Pictures
- Release date: March 17, 1938
- Running time: 58 minutes
- Country: United States
- Language: English

Topa Topa is a 1938 American Western film directed by Charles Hutchison and Vin Moore and starring Joan Valerie, James Bush and LeRoy Mason. The film was originally distributed by the Poverty Row company Pennant Pictures, but was rereleased the following year by Grand National Pictures with the alternative title Children of the Wild.

== Plot ==
After a dispute between two fur trappers ends in one being killed, suspicion wrongly falls on the dead man's wolfdog

== Cast ==
- Joan Valerie as Margaret Weston
- James Bush as Jim Turner
- LeRoy Mason as Pete Taylor
- Ruth Coleman as Laura Morton
- Jill L'Estrange as Jill Morton
- Trevor Bardette as Joe Morton
- Fred Santley as Chuck Foster
- Lyons Wickland as The Coroner
- Patsy Moran as Lydia
- Murdock MacQuarrie as Hunter
- Silver Wolf as Fangs - the Dog
- Goldie as Goldie - the Eagle

== Bibliography ==
- Pitts, Michael R. Poverty Row Studios, 1929-1940. McFarland & Company, 2005.
