= Wanda Tuchock =

American screenwriter

- Born: March 20, 1898 Pueblo, Colorado
- Died: February 10, 1985 (aged 86) Woodland Hills, Los Angeles
- Occupation: Screenwriter; director; producer; copywriter
- Education: University of California at Los Angeles
- Spouse: George DeNormand

Wanda Tuchock (March 20, 1898 – February 10, 1985) was an American advertising copywriter, screenwriter, director, and producer during the early 20th century. She was credited with writing for over thirty films, and was one of the at least three women in the 1930s to be credited as a director on a Hollywood film.

== Early life ==
Tuchock was born on March 20, 1898, in Pueblo, Colorado. She attended the University of California at Los Angeles.

== Career ==
Tuchock began her career as an advertising copy editor. In 1927, at the age of 30, she entered the silent film industry. She only had one silent film credit; she was "one of the few women who began her career in the silent era and was able to maintain her career in Hollywood during the early sound years". She was one of the few female screenwriters who worked at Metro-Goldwyn-Mayer in the early 1930s. At RKO Radio Pictures she became one of only a small number of women in the 1930s, next to Dorothy Arzner and Dorothy Davenport, to be credited as a director on a Hollywood film. Between the 1930s and the 1950s, she drew in thirty-one writing credits, two directing credits, and one producer credit. In the 1950s, Tuchock was credited as a producer, writer, and director of a short called Road Runners.

In 1929 Tuchock wrote Hallelujah, the first black-cast film produced by a major studio. In 1931 she wrote the adaptation for the film Susan Lenox (Her Fall and Rise). In 1932 she did the original adaptation for the film Little Orphan Annie, based on the comic strip. In 1934 Tuchock co-directed and wrote the film Finishing School with George Nichols Jr. In 1940 she wrote the musical Youth Will Be Served. In 1947 she wrote the screenplay for The Foxes of Harrow.

She retired in 1973 and died in 1985 at the age of 86.

=== Achievements ===
Apart from Dorothy Arzner and Dorothy Davenport, Tuchock was the only woman to receive directing credit on a Hollywood studio film in the 1930s. She wrote and co-directed the film Finishing School with George Nicholls, Jr.. She also achieved recognition during the early 20th century as a female screenwriter at Metro-Goldwyn-Mayer. Tuchock was a charter member of the Screen Writers Guild. She was named a lifetime member of the Board of Trustees of the Motion Picture and Television Fund.

== Personal life ==
She married the actor and director George DeNormand, who was born on September 22, 1903, in New York and died on December 23, 1976, in California. Tuchock retired at the age of 75 in 1973. She died on February 10, 1985, at the Motion Picture and Television Hospital in Woodland Hills, Los Angeles of an undisclosed illness at the age of 86.

== Filmography ==
Tuchock wrote for over 30 films, directed one, and produced a TV series that never aired, Man of Tomorrow

=== Writer ===
- Show People 1928
- Hallelujah 1929
- Not So Dumb 1930
- Billy The Kid 1930
- Sporting Blood 1931
- Susan Lenox (Her Fall and Rise) 1931
- The Champ 1931 (additional dialogue)
- Letty Lynton 1932 (adaptation of the novel by Marie Belloc Lowndes)
- New Morals for Old 1932 (additional dialogue)
- Bird of Paradise 1932
- Little Orphan Annie 1932
- No Other Woman 1933
- Bed of Roses 1933
- Little Women 1933
- Finishing School 1934
- Ready For Love 1934
- Grand Old Girl 1935
- O'Shaughnessy's Boy 1935
- Hawaii Calls 1938
- The Llano Kid 1939
- Youth Will Be Served 1940
- For Beauty's Sake 1941
- This Is the Life 1944
- Ladies of Washington 1944
- Sunday Dinner for a Soldier 1944
- Nob Hill 1945
- Within These Walls 1945
- The Homestretch 1947
- The Foxes of Harrow 1947
- Road Runners 1952
- The Living Swamp 1955
- Man Without a Gun 1959 (TV series, 1 episode, "Daughter of the Dragon")

=== Director ===
- Finishing School 1934
