= Wife Savers =

1928 film by Ralph Ceder

- Directed by: Ralph Ceder
- Screenplay by: Thomas J. Geraghty; Grover Jones; George Marion Jr. Arthur Wimperis
- Produced by: James Cruze; Jesse L. Lasky; Adolph Zukor
- Starring: Wallace Beery; Raymond Hatton; ZaSu Pitts; Sally Blane; Tom Kennedy; Ford Sterling
- Cinematography: Alfred Gilks; H. Kinley Martin
- Edited by: George Nichols Jr.
- Production company: Famous Players–Lasky Corporation
- Distributed by: Paramount Pictures
- Release date: January 7, 1928
- Running time: 60 minutes
- Country: United States
- Language: English

Wife Savers is a lost 1928 American comedy silent film directed by Ralph Ceder and written by Thomas J. Geraghty, Grover Jones, George Marion Jr. and Arthur Wimperis.

Wife Savers stars Wallace Beery, Raymond Hatton, ZaSu Pitts, Sally Blane, Tom Kennedy and Ford Sterling. The film was released on January 7, 1928, by Paramount Pictures.

== Plot ==
Louis Hozenozzle and 2d Lieut. Rodney Ramsbottom are two US Army soldiers stationed in Switzerland after World War I. Ramsbottom is in love with Colette, a Swiss girl.

When Rodney receives receives orders to leave Switzerland, he commands Louis to protect Colette. The Swiss Army General Lavoris desires Colette, but she rejects him. Lavoris then proclaims a fraudulent order that all unmarried Swiss women must immediately marry someone.

At Collette's request, Louis marries her to save her from Lavoris. The enraged general then writes Rodney, telling him that Louis has betrayed him. Rodney immediately returns to Switzerland and challenges Louis to a duel. Colette intercedes with Rodney, saying that she loves him and only married Louis to save herself. The town mayor grants a divorce to Louis and Colette, leaving her free to marry Rodney.

== Cast ==
Wallace Berry as Louis Hozenozzle

- Wallace Beery as Louis Hozenozzle
- Raymond Hatton as Rodney Ramsbottom
- ZaSu Pitts as Germaine
- Sally Blane as Colette
- Tom Kennedy as General Lavoris
- Ford Sterling as Tavern Keeper
- George Y. Harvey as The Major
- August Tollaire as The Mayor

== See also ==
Filmography of Wallace Beery
