= The Wheel of Life (1929 film) =

1929 film by Victor Schertzinger

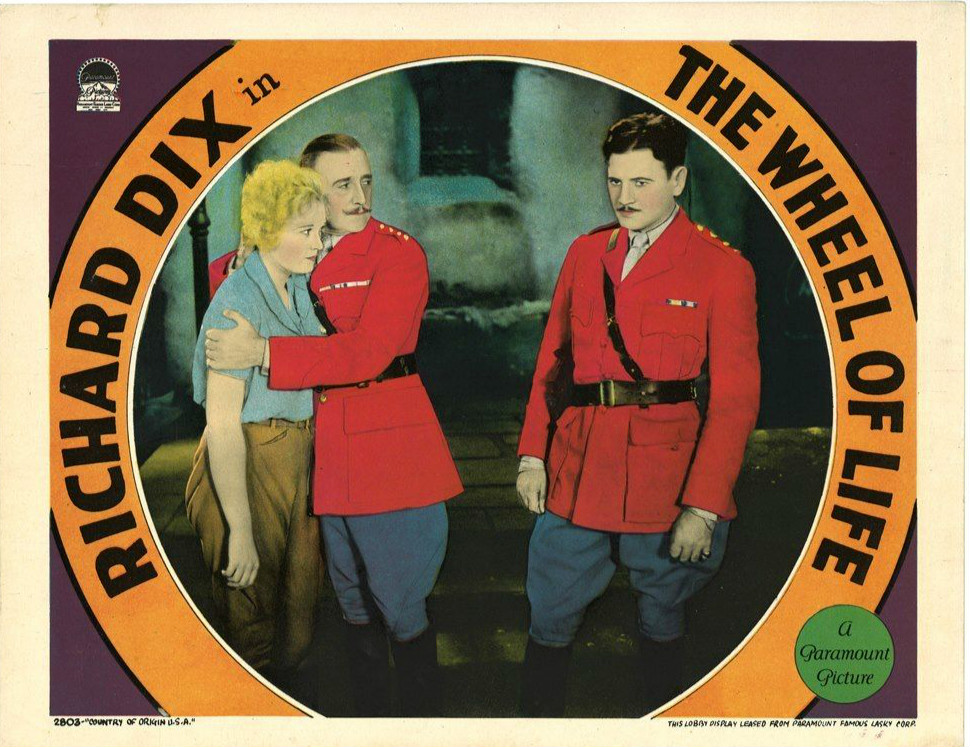
- Lobby card
- Directed by: Victor Schertzinger
- Screenplay by: James B. Fagan (play); John Farrow; Julian Johnson
- Based on: The Wheel of Life by J. B. Fagan
- Produced by: Paramount Pictures
- Starring: Richard Dix; Esther Ralston
- Narrated by: Nels Hoplin
- Cinematography: Edward Cronjager
- Edited by: Otho Lovering
- Production company: Paramount Pictures
- Distributed by: Paramount Pictures
- Release date: June 15, 1929
- Running time: 55 minutes
- Country: United States
- Language: English

The Wheel of Life is a 1929 American pre-Code romantic drama sound film directed by Victor Schertzinger and starring Richard Dix and Esther Ralston. It was produced and distributed by Paramount Pictures.

== Cast ==
- Richard Dix as Captain Leslie Yeullet
- Esther Ralston as Ruth Dangan
- O. P. Heggie as Colonel John Dangan
- Arthur Hoyt as George Faraker
- Myrtle Stedman as Mrs. Faraker
- Larry Steers as Major
- Regis Toomey as Lt. MacLaren
- Nigel De Brulier as Tsering Lama
- George Regas as Bit Role (uncredited)

== Music ==
The film features a theme song entitled "Broken Melody" which was composed by Victor Schertzinger. It is sung by an uncredited tenor offscreen and played instrumentally throughout the film.

== See also ==
- List of early sound feature films (1926–1929)
