= A Shot in the Dark (1935 film) =

1935 film by Charles Lamont

- Directed by: Charles Lamont
- Written by: Charles Belden
- Based on: The Dartmouth Murders; 1929 novel by Clifford Orr
- Produced by: George R. Batcheller
- Starring: Charles Starrett; Robert Warwick; Marion Shilling
- Cinematography: M.A. Anderson
- Edited by: Roland D. Reed
- Music by: Abe Meyer
- Production company: Chesterfield Pictures
- Distributed by: Chesterfield Pictures
- Release date: February 1, 1935
- Running time: 69 minutes
- Country: United States
- Language: English

A Shot in the Dark is a 1935 American mystery film directed by Charles Lamont and starring Charles Starrett, Robert Warwick and Marion Shilling. Produced by Chesterfield Pictures, it is an adaptation of the novel The Dartmouth Murders by Clifford Orr.

== Plot ==
A college student (Charles Starrett) discovers his roommate's body hanging from a window and calls the police. What at first looks like suicide turns out to be murder. While a police investigation is ongoing, more students are killed.

== Cast ==
- Charles Starrett as Kenneth "Ken" Harris
- Robert Warwick as Joseph Harris
- Edward Van Sloan as Prof. Bostwick
- Marion Shilling as Jean Coates
- Helen Jerome Eddy as Miss Lottie Case
- Doris Lloyd as Lucille Coates
- James Bush as Byron Coates / John Meseraux
- Julian Madison as Charlie Penlon
- Eddie Tamblyn as Bill Smart
- Ralph Brooks as Sam Anderson
- Robert McKenzie as Sheriff
- John Davidson as Prof. Brand
- Herbert Bunston as College President
- George Morrell as Deputy Ab Barber
- Broderick O'Farrell as Dr. Howell
- Jane Keckley as Bostwick's Housekeeper

== Critical reception ==
The New York Times wrote, "A Shot in the Dark, which pictures a trilogy of murders on a rural college campus, telegraphs its punches in a way that may seem insignificant to Chesterfield Productions, Inc., but is as good as a confession to us amateur gumshoes...a decided absence of liveliness both in the writing and the playing"; whereas Fantastic Movie Musings and Ramblings noted, "a very good mystery...It does have some problems, particularly in having a rather stiff and static presentation, but outside of that, this is one of the more pleasant discoveries I've made."
