= Nellie Revell =

American journalist, novelist, publicist, vaudeville performer and radio broadcaster

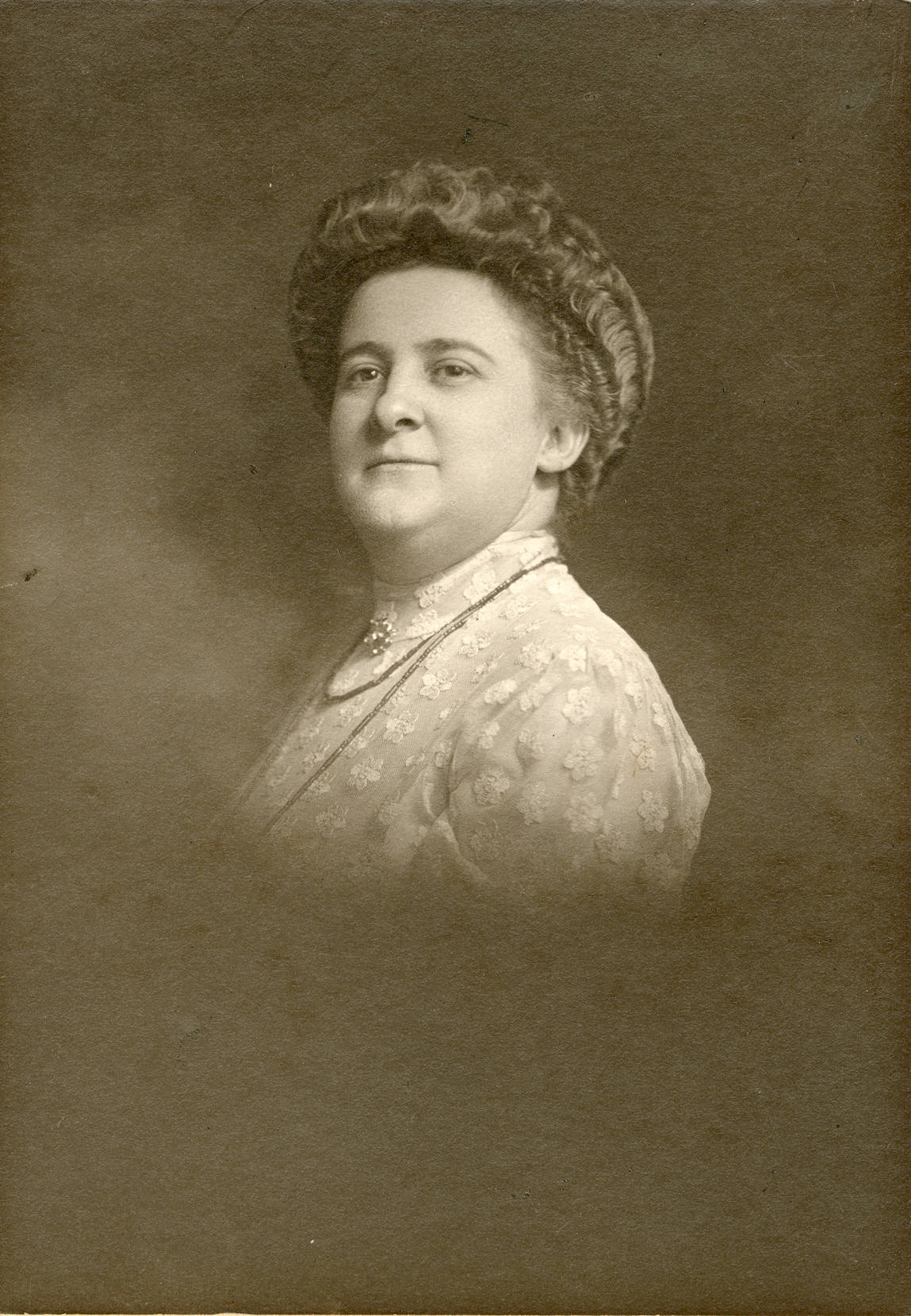
- Nellie Revell, from a 1909 photograph
- Born: Nellie McAleney; March 13, 1873; Riverton, Illinois
- Died: August 12, 1958 (aged 85)
- Occupations: Actress, publicist, writer, radio host

Nellie McAleney Revell (March 13, 1873 — August 12, 1958) was an American journalist, novelist, publicist, vaudeville performer, screenwriter, and radio broadcaster.

== Early life ==
Nellie McAleney was born in Riverton, Illinois, the daughter of Hamilton Hugh McAleney and Mary Elizabeth Evans McAleney. Her father was an Irish-born Civil War veteran; Nellie Revell sometimes said he was a newspaper man, but there is little evidence for this claim. At other times, she claimed her father was a press agent (what we today would call a publicist) who worked for such politicians as Grover Cleveland. In addition, at some times, she told reporters she had been born into a circus family, although this too is difficult to verify.

== Careers ==
=== Journalism and publicity ===
McAleney started working for newspapers as a teenager. She worked in Chicago, Denver, Seattle, New York, and San Francisco as a young woman, building a reputation for covering nontraditional stories for women reporters at the time, such as a prize fight, the Haymarket Riot, and the Iroquois Theatre fire. She traveled to Russia in 1895 to cover Czar Nicholas II's coronation, to England for Queen Victoria's funeral in 1901, and the murder trial of Harry K. Thaw in New York City in 1906. She became known for insisting that her work never be put on the women's page (where the work of female reporters was often relegated); she was among the first women reporters to successfully have her work treated equally with her male colleagues. Revell moved into publicity work after 1906, with jobs promoting vaudeville shows, circuses, and movie theatres. She became the press agent for such performers as Al Jolson, Lillie Langtry, Lillian Russell, and Will Rogers, and had her own act, singing and performing monologues.

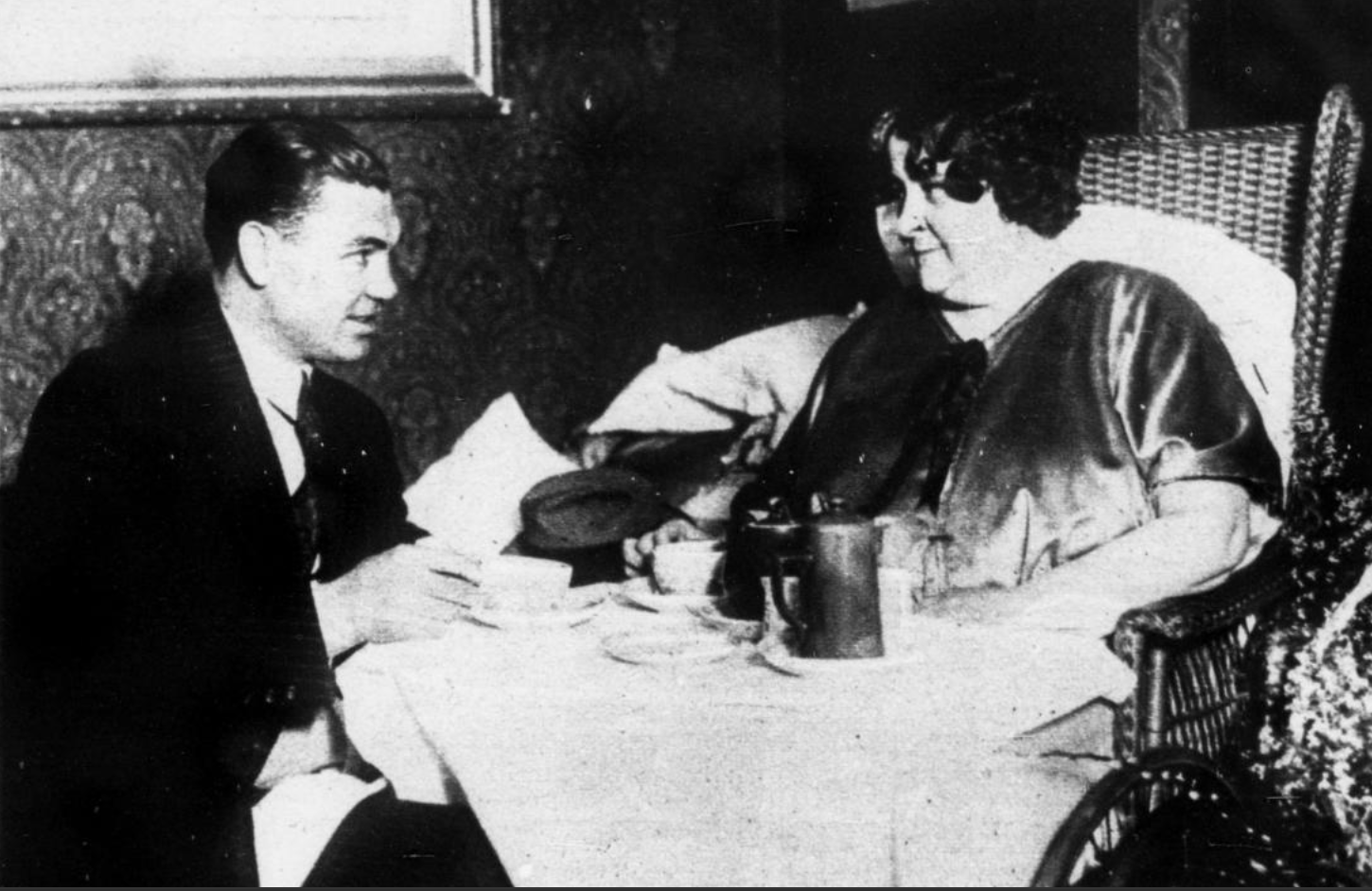
Jack Dempsey and Nellie Revell dining together; from a 1924 publication

=== "World's most famous invalid" ===
In 1919 Revell became ill with a "spinal trouble" that kept her hospitalized in a plaster cast for several years, under the care of orthopedic surgeons Adolf Lorenz and Reginald Sayre. She worked and wrote newspaper columns from her hospital bed, including a regular column for Variety magazine, which she called "Bed-Side Chats." She embracing the label "the world's most famous invalid". Illustrators Rube Goldberg, Tad Dorgan, James Montgomery Flagg and Grace Drayton made drawings of Revell in her hospital room. Benefit performances by some of her clients and colleagues were held to help her manage expenses. Hospitalized and chronically ill women wrote letters to Revell, seeking her advice for keeping hope and a positive attitude. She wrote three books about her ordeal: Right Off the Chest (1923), Fightin' Through (1925), and Funny Side Out (1925). She used a wheelchair afterward, but was able to walk again by 1925, when she was planning a lecture tour.

=== Writing ===
Revell's novel Spangles, about the circus, was adapted for the screen in 1926. She also contributed to screenplays for The Beach Club (1928) and The Mighty (1929, an early "talking" picture), and wrote titles for several silent pictures, including The Magic Flame (1927), The Golf Nut (1927), Smith's Restaurant (1928), and Smith's Farm Days (1928). She also wrote advice for an instructional manual, Writing for Vaudeville (1915, by Brett Page), and the introduction to a memoir by Sol Rothschild, It Can Be Done: A True Story (1925).

=== Radio ===
She worked in radio during the 1930s and 1940s, conducting celebrity interviews as host of a show called Neighbor Nell and Nellie Revell Presents, which ran for years on NBC radio. She retired in 1947, when cataracts began to interfere with her vision. "They've operated on me for everything except dandruff," she joked about her ongoing health issues.

== Personal life ==
Nellie McAleney was described as "a large woman, loud and opinionated, not afraid to step face-to-face with any man." She married three times. Her first husband was Charles Smith, a circus agent; they divorced. Her second husband was Joseph Revell, whose name she kept after the marriage ended. She married her third husband, agent Arthur J. Kellar, in 1913; some sources say 1915. She was widowed when Kellar died in 1940. She had twin daughters; daughter Dorothy (known as Dodo Paddack after she was adopted by friends) died in 1935. Nellie McAleney Revell died in 1958, aged 85 years. Her grave in Springfield, Illinois was unmarked until 2016, when two great-granddaughters and a grandnephew dedicated a memorial there.
