= Who Is Hope Schuyler? =

1942 film

- Theatrical release poster
- Directed by: Thomas Z. Loring
- Screenplay by: Arnaud d'Usseau
- Produced by: Sol M. Wurtzel
- Starring: Joseph Allen; Mary Howard; Sheila Ryan; Ricardo Cortez; Janis Carter; Joan Valerie
- Cinematography: Virgil Miller
- Edited by: Louis R. Loeffler
- Music by: David Raksin
- Production company: 20th Century Fox
- Distributed by: 20th Century Fox
- Release date: April 17, 1942
- Running time: 59 minutes
- Country: United States
- Language: English

Who Is Hope Schuyler? is a 1942 American action film directed by Thomas Z. Loring and written by Arnaud d'Usseau. The film stars Joseph Allen, Mary Howard, Sheila Ryan, Ricardo Cortez, Janis Carter and Joan Valerie. The film was released on April 17, 1942, by 20th Century Fox.

== Cast ==
- Joseph Allen as Tom Mason
- Mary Howard as Diane Rossiter
- Sheila Ryan as Lee Dale
- Ricardo Cortez as Anthony Pearce
- Janis Carter as Vesta Hadden
- Joan Valerie as Phyllis Guerney
- Robert Lowery as Robert Scott
- Rose Hobart as Alma Pearce
- Paul Guilfoyle as Carl Spence
- William Newell as Perley Seymour
- Pat Flaherty as Nash
- Charles Trowbridge as Judge Rossiter
- Frank Puglia as Baggott
- Edwin Stanley as Gillian Stafford
- Edward Keane as Judge
- Cliff Clark as Lt. Palmer
- Jeff Corey as Medical Examiner
- Byron Foulger as George
