= Finishing School (1934 film) =

American film by George Nicholls, Jr.

- Finishing School (1934) Movie Poster
- Directed by: George Nicholls, Jr. Wanda Tuchock
- Written by: Laird Doyle; Wanda Tuchock
- Story by: David Hempstead; Louis Weitzenkorn (uncredited)
- Based on: the play These Days by Katherine Clugston (uncredited)
- Produced by: Merian C. Cooper (executive producer); Kenneth Macgowan (associate producer)
- Starring: Frances Dee; Billie Burke; Ginger Rogers; Bruce Cabot
- Cinematography: J. Roy Hunt
- Edited by: Arthur P. Schmidt
- Production company: RKO Radio Pictures
- Distributed by: RKO Radio Pictures
- Release date: May 4, 1934
- Running time: 73 minutes
- Country: United States
- Language: English

Finishing School is a 1934 pre-Code romantic drama film starring Frances Dee as a young woman who gets into trouble after being sent to a finishing school by her neglectful parents.

This film was condemned by the Legion of Decency.

== Plot ==
Virginia Radcliff is enrolled at the exclusive Crockett Hall finishing school by her mother, with the acquiescence of her wealthy businessman father. Miss Van Alstyne, the head of the school, informs her new student of Crockett Hall's strict rules of ladylike conduct, but Virginia's new roommate, Cecilia Ferris, soon sets her straight. Van Alstyne and the rest of her staff do not really care what they do as long as it does not become public and stain the reputation of the school.

On the weekend, Cecilia (nicknamed "Pony" for her love of horses) takes Virginia to New York, chaperoned by a fake "Aunt Jessica". They meet Pony's boyfriend and Bill Martin, a conceited college football star, in a hotel room. With her new-found independence, Virginia decides to see what it feels like to get drunk. When she is, an equally-intoxicated Bill tries to take advantage of her. Hotel waiter Ralph "Mac" McFarland rescues her, punching Bill in the face. When he sees how drunk she is, Mac offers to drive her back to school. On the way, she discovers he is a medical intern at a children's hospital. The hospital does not pay him, so he has to work at the hotel to make ends meet.

Miss Van Alstyne is present when Mac drops Virginia off. Van Alstyne rebukes Virginia, not for being out with a handsome young man unchaperoned, but for being seen with him. Their relationship turns frosty. Meanwhile, Virginia sees Mac every chance she can, and they fall in love.

At the Christmas break, Virginia's father is tied up with work, and her mother decides to vacation in Florida, stranding her at school. Pony invites her to spend the holiday at her home, but Van Alstyne decides to punish her rebellious student by keeping her at school. However, Mac shows up secretly, and the couple sneaks away to the boathouse for a romantic evening. The camera pans away as they are kissing, but it is implied that they sleep together (a notion reinforced by Virginia's later actions).

A disapproving Van Alstyne intercepts and secretly tears up loving telegrams from Mac to Virginia, leaving the girl confused and heartbroken. When Van Alstyne insists that Virginia be examined by the school doctor, Virginia becomes first distraught, then defiant about what she and Mac have done. Van Alstyne summons Mrs. Radcliff and notifies her that Virginia is to be expelled. Meanwhile, Pony calls Mac to inform him what is going on. He shows up and takes Virginia away. At the school entrance, they run into Mr. Radcliff. Mac informs him that he and Virginia are going to get married that very day. After checking that his wife is not around, Mr. Radcliff offers his soon-to-be son-in-law a cigar and a congratulatory handshake.

== Cast ==
- Frances Dee as Virginia Radcliff
- Billie Burke as Helen Crawford Radcliff
- Ginger Rogers as Cecilia "Pony" Ferris
- Bruce Cabot as Ralph McFarland
- John Halliday as Frank S. Radcliffe
- Beulah Bondi as Miss Van Alstyne
- Sara Haden as Miss Fisher, a teacher
- Helen Freeman as Dr. Hewitt
- Theresa Harris as Evelyn, Mrs Radcliff's maid (uncredited)
- Marjorie Lytell as Ruth Wallace
- Adalyn Doyle as Madeleine Kelly, a student
- Anne Shirley as Billie (as Dawn O'Day)
- Irene Franklin as "Aunt Jessica"
- Ann Cameron as Miss Schmidt
- Rose Coghlan as Edith Garland
- Caroline Rankin as Miss Weber
