= Anne Shirley (actress) =

American actress (1918–1993)

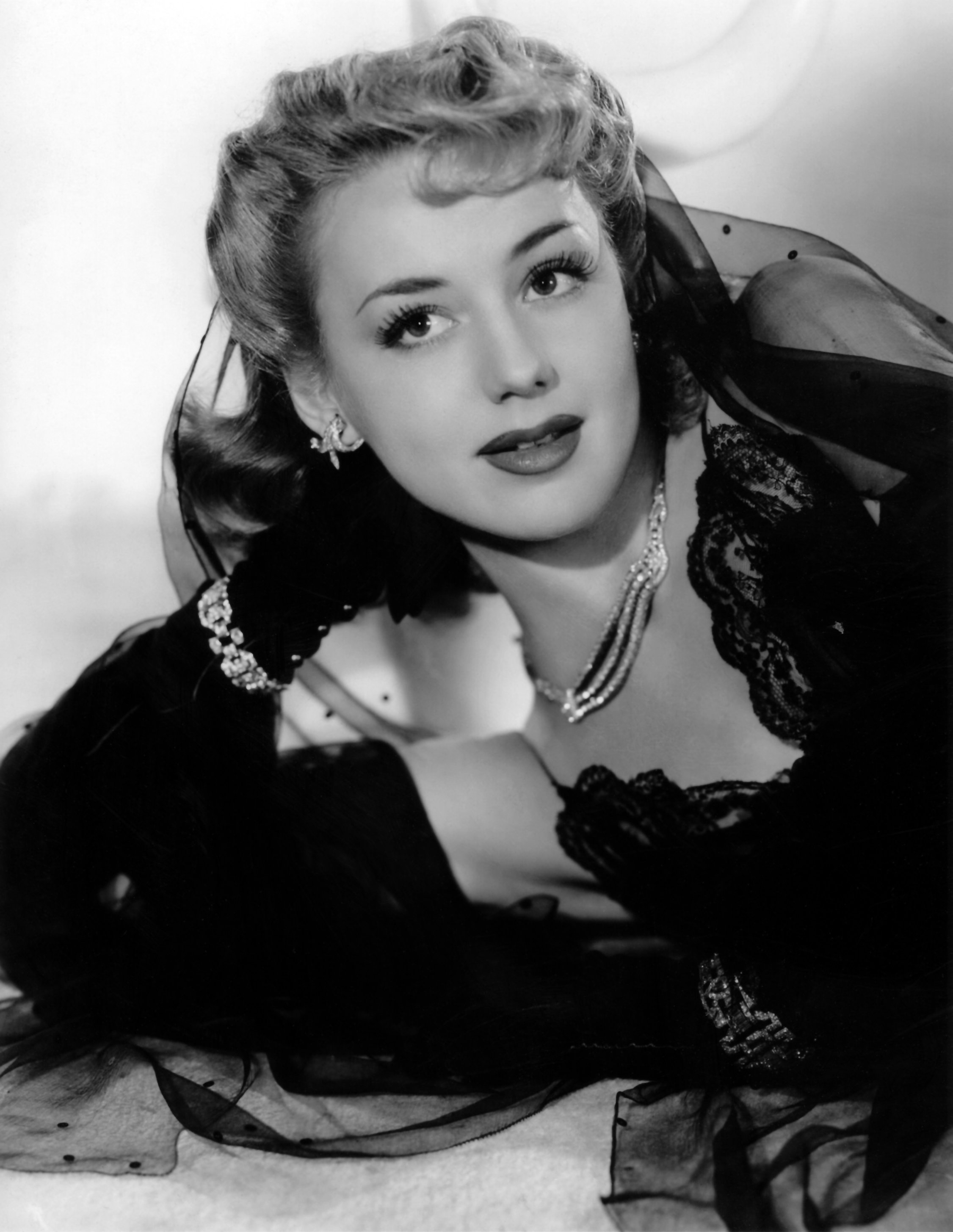
- Shirley in the 1940s
- Born: Dawn Evelyeen Paris; April 17, 1918; New York City, NY, U.S.
- Died: July 4, 1993 (aged 75); Los Angeles, California, U.S.
- Other name: Dawn O'Day
- Occupation: Actress
- Years active: 1922–1944
- Known for: Anne of Green Gables; Steamboat Round the Bend; Stella Dallas; Murder, My Sweet; Anne of Windy Poplars
- Spouses: John Payne (m. 1937; div. 1943) Adrian Scott (m. 1945; div. 1948) Charles Lederer (m. 1949; died 1976)
- Children: 2, including Julie Payne
- Awards: Hollywood Walk of Fame

Anne Shirley (born Dawn Evelyeen Paris; April 17, 1918 – July 4, 1993) was an American actress.

Beginning her career as a child actress under the stage name Dawn O'Day, she adopted the stage name of Anne Shirley after playing the titular character in the film adaptation of Anne of Green Gables in 1934, after which she achieved a successful career in supporting roles. Among her films is Stella Dallas (1937), for which she was nominated for an Academy Award for Best Supporting Actress.

Shirley left the acting profession in 1944 at the age of 26 and remained in Los Angeles, where she died at the age of 75.

== Early life ==
Born in New York City as Dawn Evelyeen Paris, Shirley began modeling as a baby and made her film debut with a featured role in Moonshine Valley (1922). She began acting at the age of five as the live-action Alice in Walt Disney's Alice Comedy Alice's Egg Plant. Shirley had a highly successful career in pre-Code films such as Liliom, Riders of the Purple Sage, So Big, Three on a Match and Rasputin and the Empress.

== Career ==
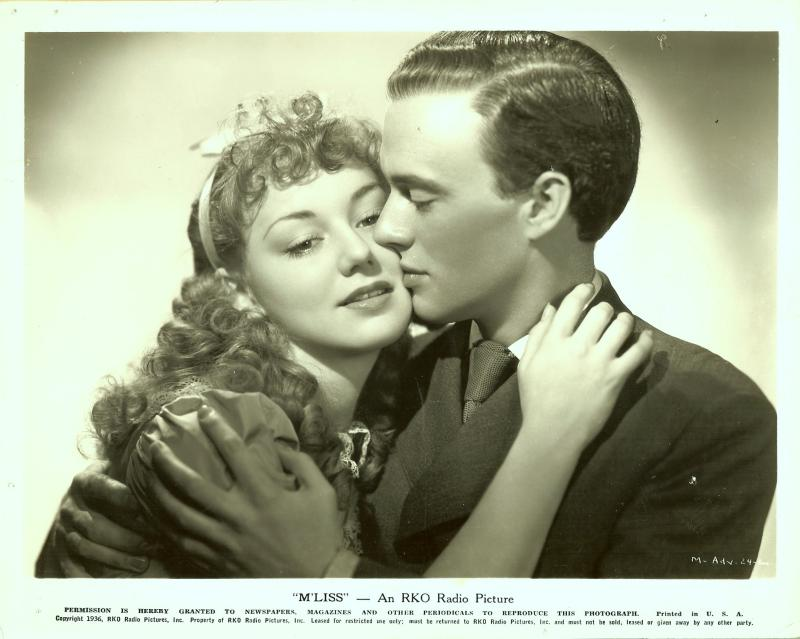
John Beal and Anne Shirley in 1936.

In 1934, Shirley starred as the character of Anne Shirley in Anne of Green Gables and took that character's name as her stage name.

Shirley tested for the role of Melanie Hamilton Wilkes in the screen version of Gone with the Wind, but Olivia de Havilland was eventually cast instead. She starred in Steamboat Round the Bend, Make Way for a Lady and Stella Dallas, for which she was nominated for the Academy Award for Best Supporting Actress. Her later roles came in films such as Vigil in the Night, Anne of Windy Poplars, The Devil and Daniel Webster and Murder, My Sweet, her final film.

Critic Bosley Crowther of The New York Times praised Shirley's performance in Saturday's Children (1940), writing that she played her role "with heroic integrity and strength of character."

== Personal life ==
Shirley married actor John Payne on August 22, 1937, in Montecito, California. They had a daughter, former actress Julie Payne, and divorced in 1943.

Her second husband was film producer and screenwriter Adrian Scott. When he was blacklisted and wanted to move the family to Europe, Shirley opted to remain in the U.S. The couple divorced in 1949.

Her third husband was Charles Lederer, nephew of Marion Davies. They had one son, Daniel Lederer.

Shirley had brief relationships with younger Western star Rory Calhoun and with French film star Jean-Pierre Aumont.

Shirley died from lung cancer in Los Angeles at the age of 75 on July 4, 1993, and was cremated. For her contributions to the motion-picture industry, she has a star on the Hollywood Walk of Fame at 7020 Hollywood Blvd.

== Filmography ==
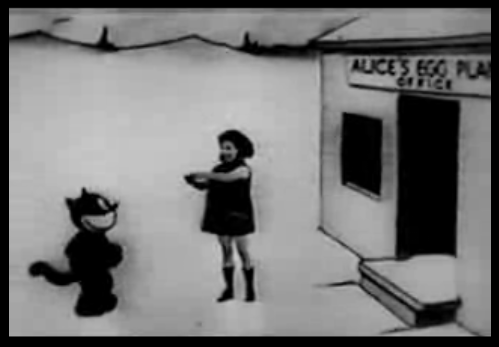
Shirley as "Alice", with Julius the Cat, in a scene from Alice's Egg Plant (1925)

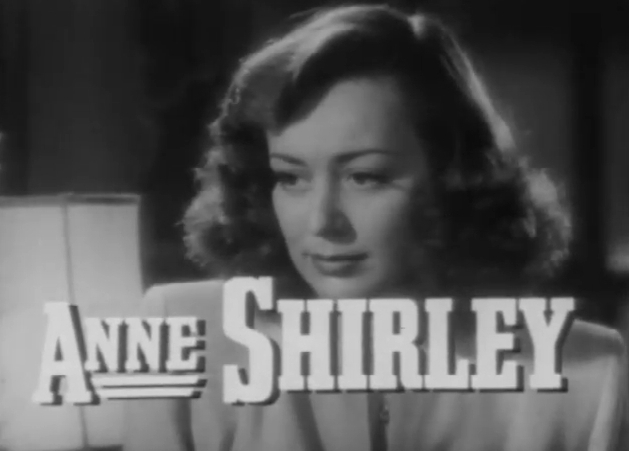
Shirley in Murder, My Sweet (1944)

Year	Title	Role	Notes
1922	The Hidden Woman	Girl	as Dawn O'Day; Lost film
1922	Moonshine Valley	Nancy	as Dawn O'Day; Lost film
1923	The Rustle of Silk	Girl	as Dawn O'Day; Lost film
1923	The Spanish Dancer	Don Balthazar Carlos	as Dawn O'Day
1924	The Man Who Fights Alone	Dorothy	as Dawn O'Day; Lost film
1924	The Fast Set	Little Margaret	as Dawn O'Day; Lost film
1925	Riders of the Purple Sage	Fay Larkin	uncredited
1925	Alice's Egg Plant	Alice	Short subject as Dawn O'Day
1927	The Callahans and the Murphys	Mary Callahan	as Dawn O'Day; Lost film
1927	Night Life	Daughter of War Profiteer	as Dawn O'Day
1928	Mother Knows Best	Sally, as a child	as Dawn O'Day; Lost film
1928	4 Devils	Marion, as a girl	as Dawn O'Day; Lost film
1928	Sins of the Fathers	Mary, as a child	as Dawn O'Day
1930	City Girl	Marie Tustine	as Dawn O'Day
1930	Liliom	Louise	as Dawn O'Day
1931	Gun Smoke	Horton's Daughter	as Dawn O'Day
1931	Hello Napoleon	The Little Girl	short, as Dawn O'Day
1931	Howdy Mate	-	short, as Dawn O'Day
1931	Rich Man's Folly	Anne, as a child	as Dawn O'Day
1932	Emma	Isabelle as a Child	uncredited
1932	Young America	Mabel Saunders	as Dawn O'Day
1932	So Big!	Selina Peake, as a Child	uncredited
1932	The Purchase Price	Sarah Tipton, the Daughter	uncredited
1932	Three on a Match	Vivian Revere as a Child	as Dawn O'Day
1932	Rasputin and the Empress	Princess Anastasia	uncredited
1933	The Life of Jimmy Dolan	Mary Lou	uncredited
1934	This Side of Heaven	Flower Girl	scenes deleted, as Dawn O'Day
1934	School for Girls	Catherine Fogarty	
1934	Finishing School	Billie	as Dawn O'Day
1934	The Key	Flower Girl	as Dawn O'Day
1934	Bachelor Bait	Miriam Ann Johnson, Marriage License Applicant	uncredited
1934	Anne of Green Gables	Anne Shirley	
1934	Picture Palace	Dawn	short, as Dawn O'Day
1934	Private Lessons	Dawn	short, as Dawn O'Day
1935	Chasing Yesterday	Jeanne Alexandre	
1935	Steamboat Round the Bend	Fleety Belle	
1936	Chatterbox	Jenny Yates	
1936	M'Liss	M'liss Smith	
1936	Make Way for a Lady	June Drew	
1937	Too Many Wives	Betty Jackson	
1937	Meet the Missus	Louise Foster	
1937	Stella Dallas	Laurel "Lollie" Dallas	nominated — Academy Award for Best Supporting Actress
1938	Condemned Women	Millie Anson	
1938	Law of the Underworld	Annabelle Porter	
1938	Mother Carey's Chickens	Nancy Carey	
1938	Girls' School	Natalie Freeman	
1938	A Man to Remember	Jean Johnson	
1939	Boy Slaves	Annie	
1939	Sorority House	Alice Fisher	
1939	Career	Sylvia Bartholomew	
1940	Vigil in the Night	Lucy Lee	
1940	Saturday's Children	Bobby Halevy	
1940	Anne of Windy Poplars	Anne Shirley	
1941	West Point Widow	Nancy Hull	
1941	Unexpected Uncle	Kathleen Brown	
1941	The Devil and Daniel Webster	Mary Stone	
1942	Four Jacks and a Jill	Karanina 'Nina' Novak	
1942	The Mayor of 44th Street	Jessey Lee	
1943	Lady Bodyguard	A.C. Baker	
1943	The Powers Girl	Ellen Evans	
1943	Bombardier	Burton Hughes	
1943	Government Girl	May Harness Blake	
1944	Man from Frisco	Diana Kennedy	
1944	Music in Manhattan	Frankie Foster	
1944	Murder, My Sweet	Anne Grayle	final film role

== Awards and nominations ==
Year	Award	Category	Nominated work	Result
1937	10th Academy Awards	Academy Award for Best Supporting Actress	Stella Dallas	Nominated
