= Francis E. Faragoh =

Hungarian-American screenwriter

Francis Edward Faragoh
- Born: Ferenc Eduárd Faragó; October 16, 1898; Budapest, Austria-Hungary
- Died: July 25, 1966 (aged 67); Oakland, California, U.S.
- Other name: Francis Edwards Faragoh
- Education: City College of New York, Columbia University
- Occupation: Screenwriter
- Years active: 1929–1947

Francis Edward Faragoh (born Ferenc Eduárd Faragó; October 16, 1898 – July 25, 1966), also known as Francis Edwards Faragoh, was a Hungarian-American screenwriter. He wrote for 20 films between 1929 and 1947. He was nominated for an Academy Award in 1931 for Best Writing, Adaptation for Little Caesar. He was born in Budapest, Hungary and died at Kaiser Hospital in Oakland, California from a heart attack.

== Selected filmography ==
- Little Caesar (1931)
- Iron Man (1931)
- Frankenstein (1931)
- The Last Man (1932)
- Hat, Coat and Glove (1934)
- Becky Sharp (1935)
- Lady from Louisiana (1941)
