= The Man Without a Country (1925 film) =

1925 film

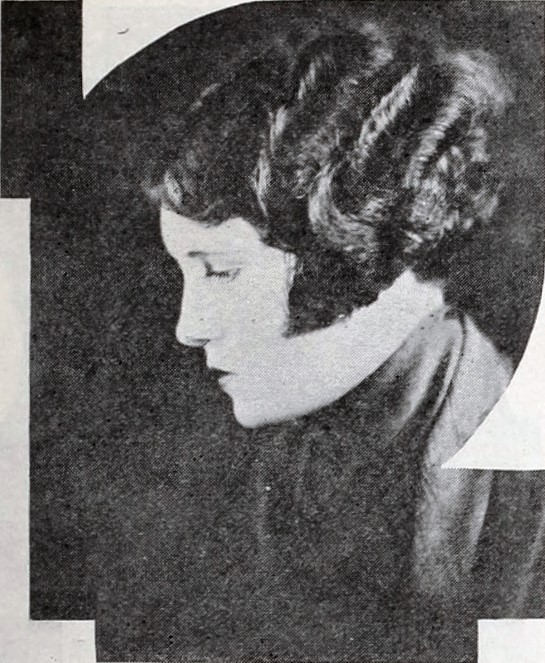
- Pauline Starke in the film
- Directed by: Rowland V. Lee
- Screenplay by: Robert N. Lee
- Based on: The Man Without a Country; 1863 story in The Atlantic Monthly by Edward Everett Hale
- Produced by: Rowland V. Lee
- Starring: Guy Edward Hearn; Pauline Starke; Lucy Beaumont; Richard Tucker; Earl Metcalfe; Edward Coxen
- Cinematography: G.O. Post
- Music by: Erno Rapee
- Production company: Fox Film Corporation
- Distributed by: Fox Film Corporation
- Release date: February 11, 1925
- Running time: 100 minutes
- Country: United States
- Language: Silent (English intertitles)

The Man Without a Country is a 1925 American drama film directed by Rowland V. Lee and written by Robert N. Lee. It is based on the 1863 short story The Man Without a Country by Edward Everett Hale. The film stars Guy Edward Hearn, Pauline Starke, Lucy Beaumont, Richard Tucker, Earl Metcalfe, and Edward Coxen. Originally titled As No Man Has Loved, the film was released on February 11, 1925, by Fox Film Corporation.

== Plot ==
As described in a film magazine review, young officer Philip Nolan, from a patriotic family, is attached to a frontier army post in 1800 when he joins the cause of Aaron Burr with his dream of a western empire. After he is court-martialed, he is asked to recant and replies, "Damn the United States! I hope that I may never hear of the United States again." His sentence is to be sent aboard a ship and never to hear of or set foot in the United States again. He begins a journey around the world that lasts through 10 presidential administrations, during which time his sweetheart Anne Bissell attempts to have him freed. After several heroic actions, including saving the day in a fight with a pirate ship, Anne secures a pardon from President Lincoln. Now old, Nolan dies as the ship is returning to the United States, and Anne dies waiting on the pier. The film ends with the spirits of Nolan and Anne together with an American flag.

== Cast ==
- Guy Edward Hearn as Lt. Philip Nolan
- Pauline Starke as Anne Bissell
- Lucy Beaumont as Mrs. Nolan
- Richard Tucker as Aaron Burr
- Earl Metcalfe as Lt. Riddle
- Edward Coxen as Lt. Harper
- Wilfred Lucas as Maj. Bissell
- Francis Powers as Col. Morgan
- Harvey Clark as Peter
- Will Walling as Capt. Shaw
- William Conklin as Capt. Danforth
- Edward Peil Sr. as Capt. Kearney
- Al Hart as President Thomas Jefferson
- Emmett King as President James Monroe
- George A. Billings as Abraham Lincoln

== Preservation ==
In February of 2021, The Man Without a Country was cited by the National Film Preservation Board on their Lost U.S. Silent Feature Films list and is therefore presumed lost.
