= In Love with Love (film) =

1924 film

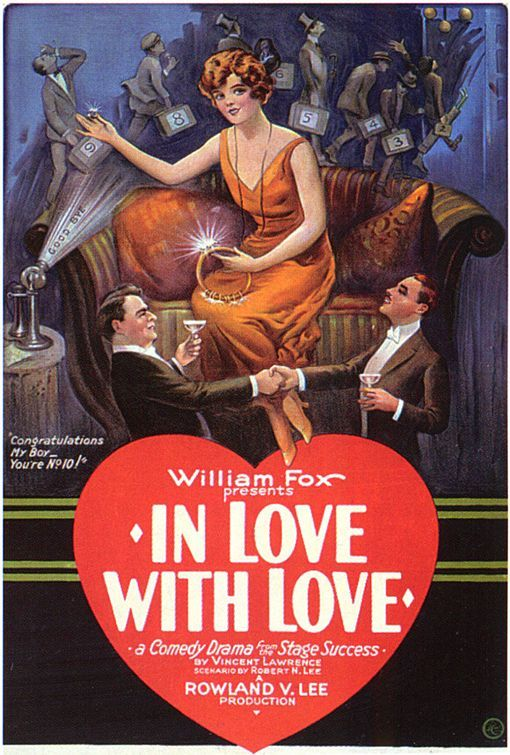
- Film poster
- Directed by: Rowland V. Lee
- Written by: Robert N. Lee (adaptation and scenario)
- Based on: In Love with Love by Vincent Lawrence
- Produced by: William Fox
- Starring: Marguerite De La Motte; Allan Forrest
- Cinematography: G. O. Post
- Distributed by: Fox Film Corporation
- Release date: December 28, 1924
- Running time: 60 minutes
- Country: United States
- Language: Silent (English intertitles)

In Love with Love is a surviving 1924 American silent comedy film directed by Rowland V. Lee and produced and distributed by the Fox Film Corporation. It starred Marguerite De La Motte. The film is based on the 1923 Broadway play In Love with Love by Vincent Lawrence which starred Lynn Fontanne, Henry Hull, and Ralph Morgan.

== Plot ==
As described in a review in a film magazine, Ann Jordan (De La Motte), the flirtatious and pampered daughter of a wealthy contractor (Walling), is inclined to favor easy going Bob (Goodwin), but breezy and conceited Frank (Sears) sweeps her off her feet and she becomes engaged to him. Shaking his hand, her father remarks that he is the thirteenth suitor he has congratulated for that reason. Bob's friend Jack (Forrest), an engineer, is preparing a design for a bridge competition. Ann's father becomes interested, invites him to the house, and copies his ideas. Ann falls in love with Jack and sweeps him off his feet, although he realizes that she is a flirt. Ann's father congratulates him on his engagement, and declares that he is responsible for Jack losing the bridge competition as he wanted the design for a bigger proposition.

== Cast ==
- Marguerite De La Motte as Ann Jordan
- Allan Forrest as Jack Gardner
- Harold Goodwin as Robert Metcalff
- William Austin as George Sears
- Mary Warren as Julia
- Will Walling as Mr. Jordan
- Allan Sears as Frank Oaks
- Mabel Forrest as Marion Sears
- Sayre Dearing as Suitor (uncredited)

== Preservation ==
The Library of Congress holds a print of this film; a nitrate from Czech film archive (cataloged under its Czech title Co Laska Natropi!).
