= Captain Kidd (film) =

1945 film by Rowland V. Lee

- Movie poster
- Directed by: Rowland V. Lee
- Screenplay by: Norman Reilly Raine
- Story by: Robert N. Lee
- Produced by: Benedict Bogeaus
- Starring: Charles Laughton; Randolph Scott; Barbara Britton
- Cinematography: Archie Stout
- Edited by: James Smith; Charles Odds
- Music by: Werner Janssen
- Production companies: Benedict Bogeaus Productions; Captain Kidd Productions
- Distributed by: United Artists
- Release date: November 22, 1945 (United States)
- Running time: 90 minutes
- Country: United States
- Language: English

Captain Kidd is a 1945 American adventure film starring Charles Laughton, Randolph Scott and Barbara Britton. It was directed by Rowland V. Lee, his last before he retired, and produced by Benedict Bogeaus and James Nasser. The music was conducted by Werner Janssen. The film was released by United Artists. It has entered the public domain because the producers neglected to renew the copyright in 1972. In his memoirs, Nikita Khrushchev noted that this was one of Joseph Stalin's favourite films, and that Stalin identified with the mischievous captain.

== Plot ==
Captain Kidd complete movie

In 1699, pirate William Kidd loots and destroys the English galleon The Twelve Apostles near Madagascar. He and his confederates bury the stolen treasure on a remote island.

He returns to London and hires a gentleman's gentleman. Kidd then presents himself at the court of William III of England as an honest shipmaster seeking a royal commission as a privateer after striking his colours to a pirate. The king is persuaded by Kidd that the captain of The Twelve Apostles was that pirate, who has disappeared with its treasure. The King grants the commission.

Kidd recruits a crew from condemned pirates in Newgate and Marshalsea prisons, promising them a royal pardon at the end of their voyage. Among them is the quarrelsome though cultured Adam Mercy. Kidd makes him the new master gunner because of his claimed prior service with pirate Captain Avery.

The King sends Kidd and his ship the Adventure Galley to the waters near Madagascar to rendezvous with the ship Quedagh Merchant and provide an escort back to England. The Quedagh Merchant carries Lord Fallsworth, the King's ambassador to the Grand Mughal, his daughter Lady Anne Dunstan, and a chest of treasure from the Indian potentate to King William.

Kidd's story about a pirate he fought nearby persuades Lord Fallsworth to switch ships with his daughter and the precious cargo. Kidd's navigator Jose Lorenzo lights a candle in the ship's magazine. Just as the transfer takes place, the Quedagh Merchant blows up. Kidd also arranges a fatal "accident" for Lord Fallsworth, leaving only a frightened Lady Anne. She turns to the only man she thinks she can trust, Shadwell, Kidd's servant. When she mentions the recent battle with pirates, Shadwell tells her it never happened. He advises her to put her faith in Adam Mercy.

On the voyage home, Kidd schemes to rid himself of his three close associates (to avoid sharing the booty) and Mercy (whom he suspects of being a spy). Mercy is really the vengeance-seeking son of Admiral Lord Blayne, the slandered captain of The Twelve Apostles. When a smitten Lorenzo tries to force himself on Lady Anne, Kidd is delighted when Mercy engages him in a sword fight. Lorenzo is driven overboard to drown. During the fight, Mercy's medallion is torn from his neck. Kidd finds it and recognizes the Blayne family crest, causing him to suspect Mercy is a relative of the murdered Captain Blayne.

Kidd drops anchor at a lagoon. Kidd, Orange Povey (his only surviving confederate, protected by an incriminating letter that will be sent to the crown authorities if he should die), and Mercy go ashore and dig up the loot from The Twelve Apostles. When Mercy sees the Blayne crest he feigns indifference, but Kidd goads him by insulting his dead father's honor. Mercy is enraged and attacks Kidd, fighting him and Povey. Outnumbered, Mercy is knocked unconscious, falls into the water, and does not resurface. While the others believe him dead, he swims secretly back to the ship. Mercy and Bart row Lady Anne away in the ship's jolly boat, but are spotted. Shadwell sacrifices himself to cover their escape and Kidd blows up the jolly boat.

Believing himself safe, Kidd appears before King William with the Mughal's treasure to claim his reward, the title and estate of Lord Blayne. He learns that Mercy and Lady Anne have survived and preceded him to court. The King's men found the loot from The Twelve Apostles after searching Kidd's cabin. Kidd is tried, condemned and hanged.

== Cast ==
- Charles Laughton as Captain William Kidd
- Randolph Scott as Adam Mercy
- Barbara Britton as Lady Anne Dunstan
- John Carradine as Orange Povey
- Gilbert Roland as Jose Lorenzo
- John Qualen as Bartholomew Blivens
- Sheldon Leonard as Cyprian Boyle
- William Farnum as Captain Rawson
- Henry Daniell as King William III
- Reginald Owen as Cary Shadwell
- Abner Biberman as Theodore Blades (uncredited)
- Harry Cording as Newgate Prison Warder
- Ray Teal as Michael O'Shawn (uncredited)
- Frederick Worlock as Landers, Newgate Prison Governor (uncredited)

== Production ==
Charles Laughton's casting was announced in December 1944. Laughton said he had long been interested in playing Kidd and liked the opportunity to show his versatility. Rowland Lee was signed to direct.

In January 1945 Randolph Scott signed to play the romantic male lead. Filming began 25 January. It was shot at the General Service Studio using a boat that had been built for The Black Swan and used for The Princess and the Pirate. Reginald Owen was borrowed from MGM.

== Awards ==
This film was nominated for an Academy Award for Best Original Score at the 18th Academy Awards.

== Notes ==
As a work of fiction rather than a documentary film, the story contains some historically incorrect material, including a London scene showing Tower Bridge two hundred years before it was built. Kidd's London prisoner crew was removed before it sailed from England and Kidd was forced to find a new crew in New York City. Kidd returned to New York, not to London.

Laughton reprised his part in the 1952 farce Abbott and Costello Meet Captain Kidd.

== See also ==
- Abbott and Costello Meet Captain Kidd, a 1952 comedy film in which Laughton reprised his role
- List of films in the public domain in the United States
