= The Guilty Generation =

1931 film

- Directed by: Rowland V. Lee
- Written by: Jo Milward; J. Kirby Hawks; Jack Cunningham
- Produced by: Harry Cohn
- Starring: Leo Carrillo; Constance Cummings; Robert Young
- Cinematography: Byron Haskin
- Edited by: Otis Garrett
- Color process: Black and white
- Production company: Columbia Pictures
- Distributed by: Columbia Pictures
- Release date: November 19, 1931
- Running time: 82 minutes
- Country: United States
- Language: English

The Guilty Generation is a 1931 American pre-code crime film directed by Rowland V. Lee and starring Leo Carrillo, Constance Cummings and Robert Young.

== Plot ==
The children of feuding gangsters fall in love and fight to escape their parents' notoriety.

== Cast ==
- Leo Carrillo as Mike Palmiero
- Constance Cummings as Maria Palmiero
- Robert Young as Marco Ricca
- Boris Karloff as Tony Ricca
- Emma Dunn as Nina Palmero
- Leslie Fenton as Joe Pamiero
- Murray Kinnell as Jerry
- Ruth Warren as Nellie Weaver

== See also ==
- Boris Karloff filmography
