= Mixed Faces =

1922 film

- Directed by: Rowland V. Lee
- Written by: Paul Schofield
- Starring: William Russell; Renée Adorée; DeWitt Jennings; Elizabeth Garrison; Charles K. French
- Cinematography: David Abel
- Production company: Fox Film Corporation
- Distributed by: Fox Film Corporation
- Release date: October 22, 1922
- Running time: 5 reels
- Country: United States
- Languages: Silent film (English intertitles)

Mixed Faces is a 1922 American silent comedy film directed by Rowland V. Lee and starring William Russell, Renée Adorée, DeWitt Jennings, Elizabeth Garrison, and Charles K. French. The film was released by Fox Film Corporation on October 22, 1922.

== Plot ==
As described in Exhibitors Herald:

Judge Granger is dating with the daughter of Mr. and Mrs. Sayre. They are in favor of the match but the girl finds him too self centered and she longs for romance. She leaves for the city and promises to write her answer to him. Jimmy Gallop, a traveling fire extinguisher salesman from the small town named Media, who so just look like the Judge too closely that the locals cannot tell them apart. Jimmy leaves for New York and accidentally encounter the Judge's girlfriend, Mary there. She also mistakes him for the Judge and invite him to her apartment. She eventually realizes that Judge Granger has romance in his soul. During the political campaign, Jimmy Gallop is bribed by the judge's opponents to deliver an address impersonating as him while they themselves abduct the judge away. This almost damages the judge's chances of be re-elected and he is unable to convince the people of the mistake. His sweetheart also sees that he does not act the same as when he was in the apartment.

Jimmy offers to do his part in squaring matters and appears on the platform with the judge to tell of the trick. Meanwhile he has replaced the judge's position in the girl's affections and she is convinced that it is Jimmy and not the judge that she loves. The judge transfers his affections to his waiting secretary.

== Cast ==
- William Russell as Judge J. Woodworth Granger / Jimmy Gallop
- Renée Adorée as Mary Allen Sayre
- DeWitt Jennings as Murray McGuire
- Elizabeth Garrison as Mrs. Sayre
- Charles French as Mr. Sayre
- Aileen Manning as Mrs. Molly Crutcher
- Harvey Clarke as William Haskins

== Reception ==
The film received mixed reviews from critics. Moving Picture World gave this film a positive review, praising its story, performances of William Russell and Renée Adorée, while photography gets some criticism stating not always up to the best standard. Exhibitors Herald and The Film Daily gave the negative reviews, former finding actor having simultaneously play two roles confusing and one coming in the middle of this film wouldn't know what it is all about. Latter criticizing unoriginally of story regarding the combination of comedy and melodrama but that isn't sufficiently strong to make a good film and some comedy bits were being marked as too short and not important. The cast were considered fair by them.

== Preservation ==
The film is presumed lost, as no copies were known to exist.

== See also ==
- List of lost films
- 1937 Fox vault fire
