= Rowland V. Lee =

American film director (1891–1975)

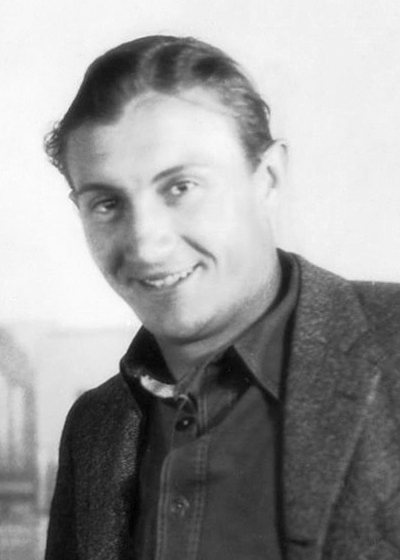
- Lee in 1928
- Born: Rowland Vance Lee; September 6, 1891; Findlay, Ohio, U.S.
- Died: December 21, 1975 (aged 84); Palm Desert, California, U.S.
- Occupations: Actor, director, producer
- Relatives: Robert N. Lee (brother)

Rowland Vance Lee (September 6, 1891 – December 21, 1975) was an American film director, actor, writer, and producer.

== Biography ==
=== Early life ===
Born in Findlay, Ohio, Lee was the son of a suffragette who founded a newspaper. He studied at Columbia University and served in the infantry during World War I.

=== Acting career ===
Lee had early appearances in Wild Winship's Widow (1917), Time Locks and Diamonds (1917), The Mother Instinct (1917), Polly Ann (1917), The Stainless Barrier (1917), The Maternal Spark (1917) and They're Off (1918).

He appeared in the films The Woman in the Suitcase, Water, Water, Everywhere, His Own Law (supporting Hobart Bosworth), and Her Husband's Friend (all 1920).

=== Directing ===
==== Change of profession ====
Thomas H. Ince suggested Lee make a choice between acting and directing. Lee moved into directing starting with A Thousand to One (1920), Cupid's Brand (1921), and The Cup of Life (1921). He directed two films for former co-star Hobart Bosworth, Blind Hearts and The Sea Lion (both 1921).

Lee made What Ho, the Cook (1921), Money to Burn (1922), The Men of Zanzibar (1922), His Back Against the Wall (1922), A Self-Made Man (1922), Dust Flower (1922), and Mixed Faces (1922).

==== Fox ====
Lee went to Fox where he directed Shirley of the Circus (1923). He directed and scripted a 1923 adaptation of the Booth Tarkington novel Alice Adams, which propelled him into the big time. He followed it with Desire (1923) at Metro. He fell ill during the making of Desire.

Back at Fox, Lee directed Gentle Julia (1923), another Tarkington adaptation. After Gentle Julia, Lee spent several months studying filmmaking in Europe, a practice he would continue for the next decade.

Lee did You Can't Get Away with It (1923), In Love with Love (1924) with Marguerite De La Motte, and an expensive adaptation of The Man Without a Country (1925).

Other credits included Havoc (1925), The Outsider (1926) (with Walter Pidgeon), and The Silver Treasure (1927), based on Nostromo by Joseph Conrad. He also directed The Whirlwind of Youth (1927).

==== Paramount ====
Lee went to Paramount in 1926 where he directed Pola Negri in Barbed Wire (1927) and The Secret Hour (1928). Doomsday (1928) starred Florence Vidor and Gary Cooper. He was reunited with Negri for Three Sinners (1928) and Loves of an Actress (1928) then did The First Kiss (1928) with Cooper and Fay Wray.

In 1929, he directed The Wolf of Wall Street featuring George Bancroft. He followed it with A Dangerous Woman (1929) starring Olga Baclanova, then Lee made the first sound Fu Manchu film, The Mysterious Dr. Fu Manchu (1929). He spent three months touring Europe in 1929.

Lee was one of many directors who contributed to the all-star revue Paramount on Parade (1930). The Return of Dr. Fu Manchu (1930) was a sequel to The Mysterious Dr Fu Manchu. Lee then made Ladies Love Brutes (1930) and Derelict (1930) with Bancroft, and A Man from Wyoming (1930), with Cooper.

==== England ====
Lee went to Warners to make The Ruling Voice (1931) with Walter Huston. He based himself in England for the next two years where he wrote an English version script of Captain Craddock (1931), did The Guilty Generation (1931) at Columbia and That Night in London (1931) for Paramount in England; the latter starred Robert Donat.

Back at Fox, Lee directed Zoo in Budapest (1933), I Am Suzanne (1933) and Gambling (1934); the latter starred George M. Cohan.

==== Edward Small ====
Edward Small hired Lee to write and direct an adaptation of The Count of Monte Cristo (1934) for United Artists starring Donat; it was a huge success and ushered in a cycle of swashbuckling films.

Fox had merged to become 20th Century-Fox whose production head Darryl F. Zanuck hired Lee to direct one of the studio's first films, the biopic Cardinal Richelieu (1935) starring George Arliss.

Lee received an offer from RKO to write and direct another swashbuckler, The Three Musketeers (1935). For United Artists he did One Rainy Afternoon (1936) and the English-shot Agatha Christie adaptation, Love from a Stranger (1937).

Back in Hollywood, Lee was reunited with Small for The Toast of New York (1937), a biopic that was a notorious flop. It was made at RKO who also financed Lee's next film, Mother Carey's Chickens (1938).

==== Universal ====
Lee signed a contract at Universal, where he directed Service de Luxe (1938). He had a big success with Son of Frankenstein (1939) starring Basil Rathbone and Boris Karloff. Lee followed it with The Sun Never Sets (1939) with Rathbone and Douglas Fairbanks Jr., and Tower of London (1939) with Rathbone and Karloff.

=== Later films ===
Lee made another swashbuckler for Small, The Son of Monte Cristo (1940). He returned to RKO to do Powder Town (1942), then made a film for another independent producer, Benedict Bogeaus, The Bridge of San Luis Rey (1944). Bogeaus liked Lee's work and used him on the swashbuckler Captain Kidd (1945). Lee announced he would then make a film about Robespierre but he ended up retiring in 1945.

=== Activism ===
In 1936 Lee was one of the founder members of the Screen Directors Guild (today the Directors Guild of America) formed to protect Directors' rights.

== The Rowland V. Lee Ranch and later life ==
Lee focused on running his ranch in the San Fernando Valley which he had bought in 1935. He raised cattle and alfalfa. In August 1940, two girls drowned in his private lake while Lee was away.

He converted part of his acreage overlooking the Chatsworth Reservoir into a motion picture location. Among the films shot there were I've Always Loved You, Strangers on a Train (1951), At Sword's Point, The Night of the Hunter (1955), Friendly Persuasion (1956),The Light in the Forest (1958) and Back Street (1961). By the early 1960s though the land had become too valuable to use as a location.

Lee decided to return to filmmaking by producing The Big Fisherman from the novel by Lloyd C. Douglas. He wrote the script with Howard Estabrook and hired Frank Borzage to direct it.

In 1975, three months past his 84th birthday, Lee died of a heart attack at home in Palm Desert, California, having just finished writing a screenplay, a mystery called The Belt. He was survived by his wife, Eleanor, and brother, Donald W. Lee, a former Hollywood film writer. While it has been reported incorrectly that the former Rowland V. Lee Ranch was subdivided and developed after his death, in fact development of the property began much earlier. Portions of the ranch had begun to be developed by the late 1950s, with the Corporate Pointe industrial park among the first major projects to be built in the area. Development continued throughout the 1960s, with much of the ranch becoming suburban single-family housing typical of the western San Fernando Valley. The section of the former ranch containing Lee Lake was the last major portion to be developed, becoming the gated community Hidden Lake Estates, which was completed by 1971. The lake remains intact as a part of the gated community.

Lee has a star on the Hollywood Walk of Fame. He was buried at Forest Lawn Memorial Park, in Glendale, California.

== Complete filmography ==
=== As actor ===
- Wild Winship's Widow (1917) - Archibald Herndon
- Time Locks and Diamonds (1917) - Edgar Seymour
- The Mother Instinct (1917) - Jacques
- Polly Ann (1917) - Howard Straightlane
- The Stainless Barrier (1917) - Richard Shelton
- The Maternal Spark (1917) - Howard Helms
- They're Off (1918) - Randolph Manners
- The Woman in the Suitcase (1920) - W.H. 'Billy' Fiske
- Water, Water, Everywhere (1920) - Arthur Gunther
- Dangerous Days (1920) - Graham Spencer
- His Own Law (1920) - Jean Saval
- Her Husband's Friend (1920) - Billy Westover (final film role)

=== As director ===
Key:

^{P} : also producer
^{W} : also writer
^{P, W} : also producer and writer

- A Thousand to One (1920)
- Cupid's Brand (1921)
- The Cup of Life (1921)
- Blind Hearts (1921)
- The Sea Lion (1921)
- What Ho, the Cook ^{W} (1921)
- Money to Burn (1922) horror-comedy
- The Men of Zanzibar (1922)
- His Back Against the Wall (1922)
- A Self-Made Man ^{W} (1922)
- The Dust Flower (1922)
- Mixed Faces (1922)
- Shirley of the Circus (1922)
- Alice Adams ^{W} (1923)
- Desire (1923)
- Gentle Julia (1923)
- You Can't Get Away with It (1923)
- In Love with Love (1924)
- The Man Without a Country (1925)
- Havoc (1925)
- The Outsider (1926)
- The Silver Treasure (1926)
- The Whirlwind of Youth (1927)
- Barbed Wire ^{P, W} (1927)
- The Secret Hour ^{W} (1928)
- Doomsday ^{P} (1928)
- Three Sinners ^{P} (1928)
- Loves of an Actress ^{W} (1928)
- The First Kiss ^{P} (1928)
- The Wolf of Wall Street (1929)
- A Dangerous Woman (1929)
- The Mysterious Dr. Fu Manchu ^{P} (1929) (uncredited)
- Paramount on Parade (1930) (sequence director)
- The Return of Dr. Fu Manchu ^{P} (1930)
- Ladies Love Brutes (1930)
- A Man from Wyoming (1930)
- Derelict (1930)
- The Ruling Voice ^{W} (1931)
- The Guilty Generation (1931)
- That Night in London (1932)
- Zoo in Budapest ^{W} (1933)
- I Am Suzanne! ^{W} (1933)
- The Count of Monte Cristo ^{W} (1934)
- Gambling (1934)
- Cardinal Richelieu (1935)
- The Three Musketeers ^{W} (1935)
- One Rainy Afternoon (1936)
- Love from a Stranger (1937)
- The Toast of New York (1937)
- Mother Carey's Chickens (1938)
- Service de Luxe ^{P} (1938)
- Son of Frankenstein ^{P} (1939)
- The Sun Never Sets ^{P} (1939)
- Tower of London ^{P} (1939)
- The Son of Monte Cristo ^{P} (1940)
- Powder Town (1942)
- The Bridge of San Luis Rey ^{P} (1944)
- Captain Kidd ^{P, W} (1945)

=== As producer ===
- Barbed Wire (1927) (uncredited)
- Doomsday (1928)
- Three Sinners (1928)
- The First Kiss (1928)
- The Mysterious Dr. Fu Manchu (1929) (uncredited)
- The Return of Dr. Fu Manchu (1930)
- The Sign of Four: Sherlock Holmes' Greatest Case (1932), production supervisor
- Service de Luxe (1938)
- Son of Frankenstein (1939)
- The Sun Never Sets (1939)
- Tower of London (1939)
- The Son of Monte Cristo (1940)
- The Bridge of San Luis Rey (1944)
- The Big Fisherman (1959)

=== As writer ===
- What Ho, the Cook (1921)
- A Self-Made Man (1922)
- Alice Adams (1923)
- Barbed Wire (1927)
- The Secret Hour (1928)
- Loves of an Actress (1928)
- The Ruling Voice (1931)
- Le capitaine Craddock (1931)
- Monte Carlo Madness (1932)
- Zoo in Budapest (1933)
- I Am Suzanne! (1933)
- The Count of Monte Cristo (1934)
- The Three Musketeers (1935)
- The Big Fisherman (1959)

== See also ==
- Multicolor
