= Leslie Fenton =

American actor

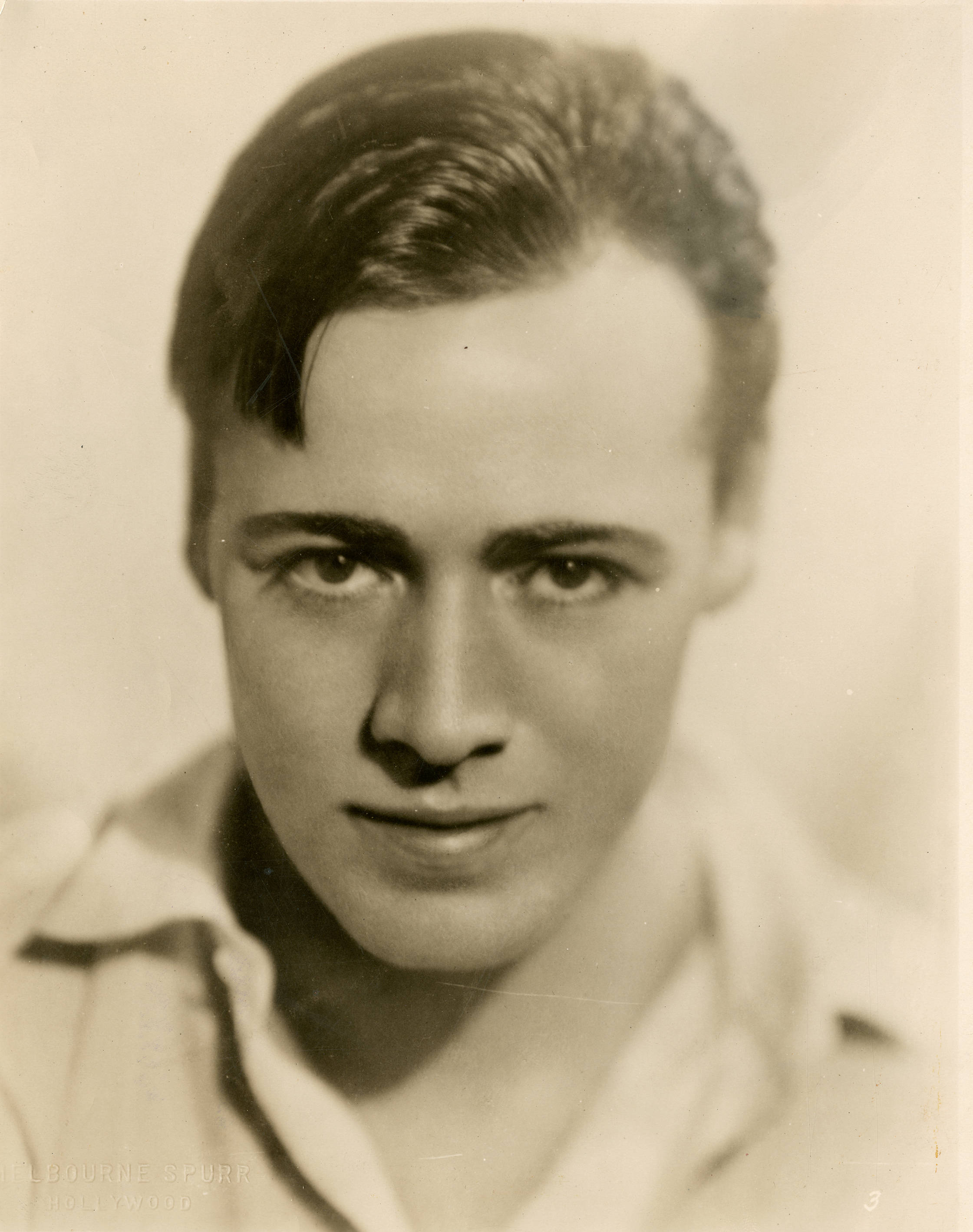
- Photo of Fenton from Film Star Who's Who on the Screen (1926)
- Born: 12 March 1902; Liverpool, Lancashire, England
- Died: 25 March 1978 (aged 76); Montecito, California, United States
- Occupations: Actor; Film director
- Years active: 1923–1951
- Spouse(s): Ann Dvorak (1932–45; divorced); Marcella Zabala Howard (1952–78; his death)

Leslie Fenton (12 March 1902 – 25 March 1978) was an English actor and film director. He appeared in more than 60 films between 1923 and 1945.

== Early life ==
Fenton immigrated to America with his mother, Elizabeth Carter Fenton, and his brothers when he was six years old. They sailed as steerage passengers on board the R.M.S. Celtic, which departed from Liverpool, 11 September 1909, and arrived at New York, where they were ferried over to Ellis Island for "U.S. Immigrant Inspection" on 19 September. They were quickly admitted and continued their journey by rail to join his father, shoe manufacturer's representative Richard Fenton, in Mifflin, Ohio.

== Career ==
As a teenager, Leslie worked as an office clerk. He moved to New York and began a career on the stage. His film career began later with Fox Studios. He also directed 19 films between 1938 and 1951.

In 1945, Fenton and actor Fred MacMurray established "Mutual Pictures", producing one film, "Pardon My Past". MacMurray starred in a dual role and Fenton directed.

== Military service ==
Fenton saw active service during the Second World War. In spring 1941, he was commissioned into the Royal Navy Volunteer Reserve. In 1942, as commander of a Motor Launch vessel, he took part in the St Nazaire Raid. He was injured in the raid and spent months convalescing in Devon, England. Unable to return to sea, he was assigned to a desk job at the War Office.

== Personal life ==
He married American actress Ann Dvorak in 1932. Dvorak (Anna May McKim) moved to Britain with Fenton while he served in the British armed forces during the Second World War. The union was childless and ended in divorce in 1945. Fenton died 25 March 1978 in Montecito, California, aged 76. Some sources, including IMDb, incorrectly cite Frank Fenton, the noted screenwriter and novelist, as his younger brother. Frank Fenton's parents were actually John Fenton and Eveline Edgington (married Liverpool, 1900), as evidenced by the ship's manifest for the RMS Caronia (page 0817, line 0008), aboard which Frank Fenton arrived in the US on 21 April 1906.

== Selected filmography ==
As actor:

- Gentle Julia (1923)
- Havoc (1925) as Babe
- Thunder Mountain (1925) as Sam Martin
- Lazybones (1925) as Dick Ritchie
- East Lynne (1925) as Richard Hare
- The Ancient Mariner (1925) as Joe Barlow
- The Road to Glory (1926) as David Hale
- Sandy (1926) as Douglas Keith
- The Shamrock Handicap (1926) as Neil Ross
- Black Paradise (1926) as James Callahan
- What Price Glory? (1926) as Lt. Moore
- The Gateway of the Moon (1928) as Jim Mortlake
- The Showdown (1928) as Kilgore Shelton
- The Drag Net (1928) as Shakespeare
- The First Kiss (1928) as Carol Talbot
- The Office Scandal (1929) as Andrew 'Andy' Corbin
- Girls Gone Wild (1929) as Boogs
- A Dangerous Woman (1929) as Peter Allerton
- The Man I Love (1929) as Carlo Vesper
- Broadway (1929) as 'Scar' Edwards
- Paris Bound (1929) as Richard Parrish
- Woman Trap (1929) as Eddie Evans
- The Last Performance (1929) as Buffo Black
- Dynamite (1929) as Young 'Vulture'
- The Man Who Came Back (1931) as Baron le Duc
- The Public Enemy (1931) as Samuel 'Nails' Nathan
- Kick In (1931) as Charlie
- Murder at Midnight (1931) as Walter Grayson
- The Pagan Lady (1931) as Gerald 'Gerry' Willis
- The Guilty Generation (1931) as Joe Palmero
- The Hatchet Man (1932) as Harry En Hai
- The Famous Ferguson Case (1932) as Jim Perrin
- The Strange Love of Molly Louvain (1932) as Nicky Grant
- Thunder Below (1932) as Webb
- Air Mail (1932) as Tony Dressel
- F.P.1 (1933) as Capt. B.E. Droste
- Night Flight (1933) as Jules' Radio Operator / Co-Pilot
- Lady Killer (1933) as Duke
- I Believed in You (1934) as Russell Storm
- Fugitive Road (1934) as Frank Riker
- Take the Stand (1934) as Hugh Halliburton
- Marie Galante (1934) as Gen. Saki Tenoki
- Strange Wives (1934) as Svengaart
- White Lies (1934) as Dan Oliver
- The Casino Murder Case (1935) as Dr. Kane
- Star of Midnight (1935) as Tim Winthrop
- Stolen Harmony (1935) as Joe Harris (uncredited)
- Chinatown Squad (1935) as Su Quong
- Men Without Names (1935) as Monk
- East of Java (1935) as Captain Wong Bo
- Two in the Dark (1936) as Stuart Eldredge
- Murder on a Bridle Path (1936) as Don Gregg
- Sworn Enemy (1936) as Steve Sherman
- The Longest Night (1936) as Carl Briggs
- House of Secrets (1936) as Barry Wilding
- China Passage (1937) as Anthony Durand
- Boys Town (1938) as Dan Farrow

As director:

- Tell No Tales (1939)
- The Man from Dakota (1940)
- The Saint's Vacation (1941)
- Whispering Smith (1948)
- Streets of Laredo (1949)
- The Redhead and the Cowboy (1951)
