= The First Kiss (1928 American film) =

1928 film

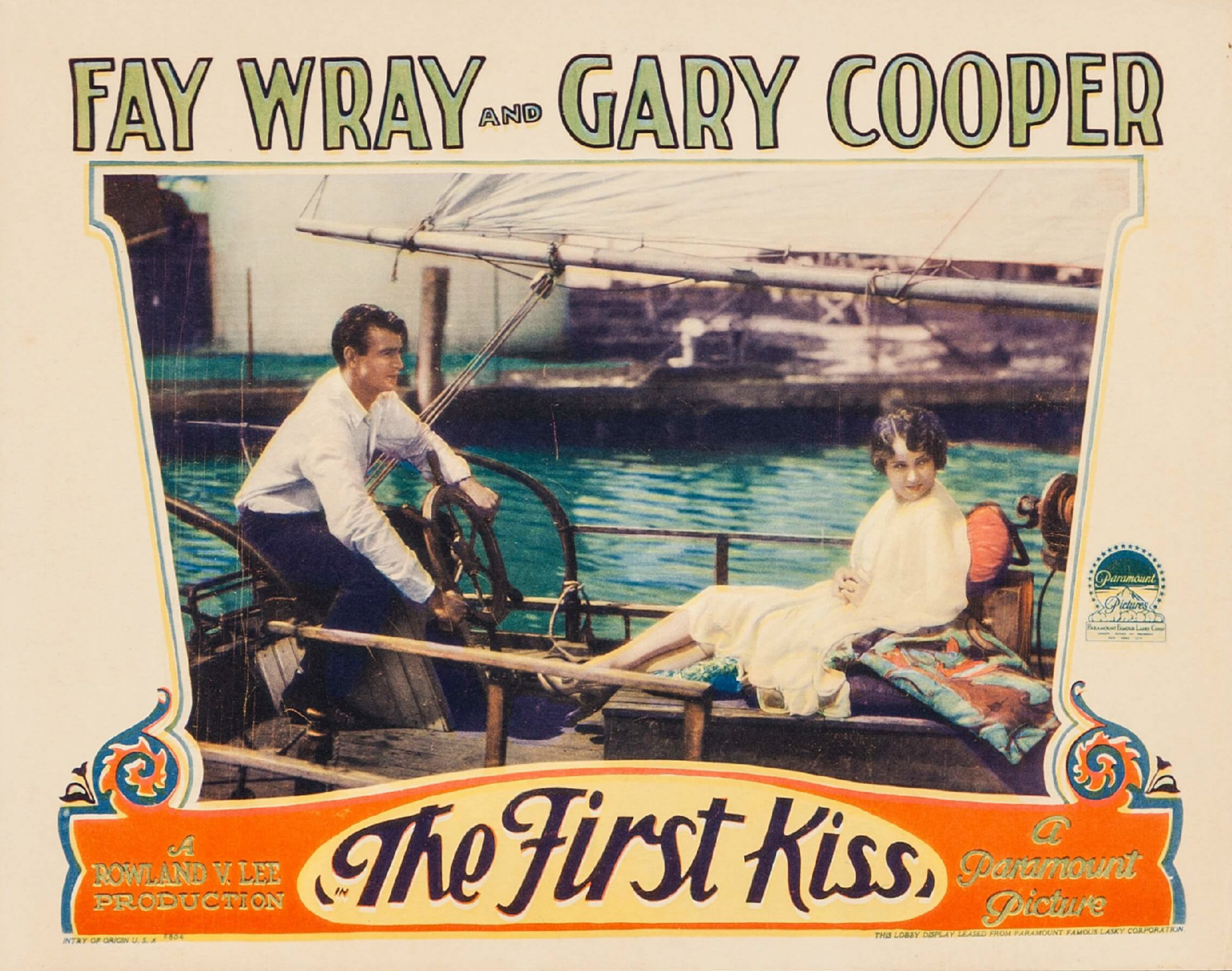
- Lobby card
- Directed by: Rowland V. Lee
- Written by: John Farrow; Tom Reed
- Based on: Four Brothers by Tristram Tupper
- Produced by: B. P. Schulberg; Rowland V. Lee; Adolph Zukor; Jesse Lasky
- Starring: Fay Wray; Gary Cooper
- Cinematography: Alfred Gilks
- Edited by: Lee Helen
- Production company: Paramount Pictures
- Distributed by: Paramount Pictures
- Release date: August 25, 1928 (USA)
- Running time: 60 minutes (6 reels)
- Country: United States
- Languages: Sound (Synchronized) (English Intertitles)

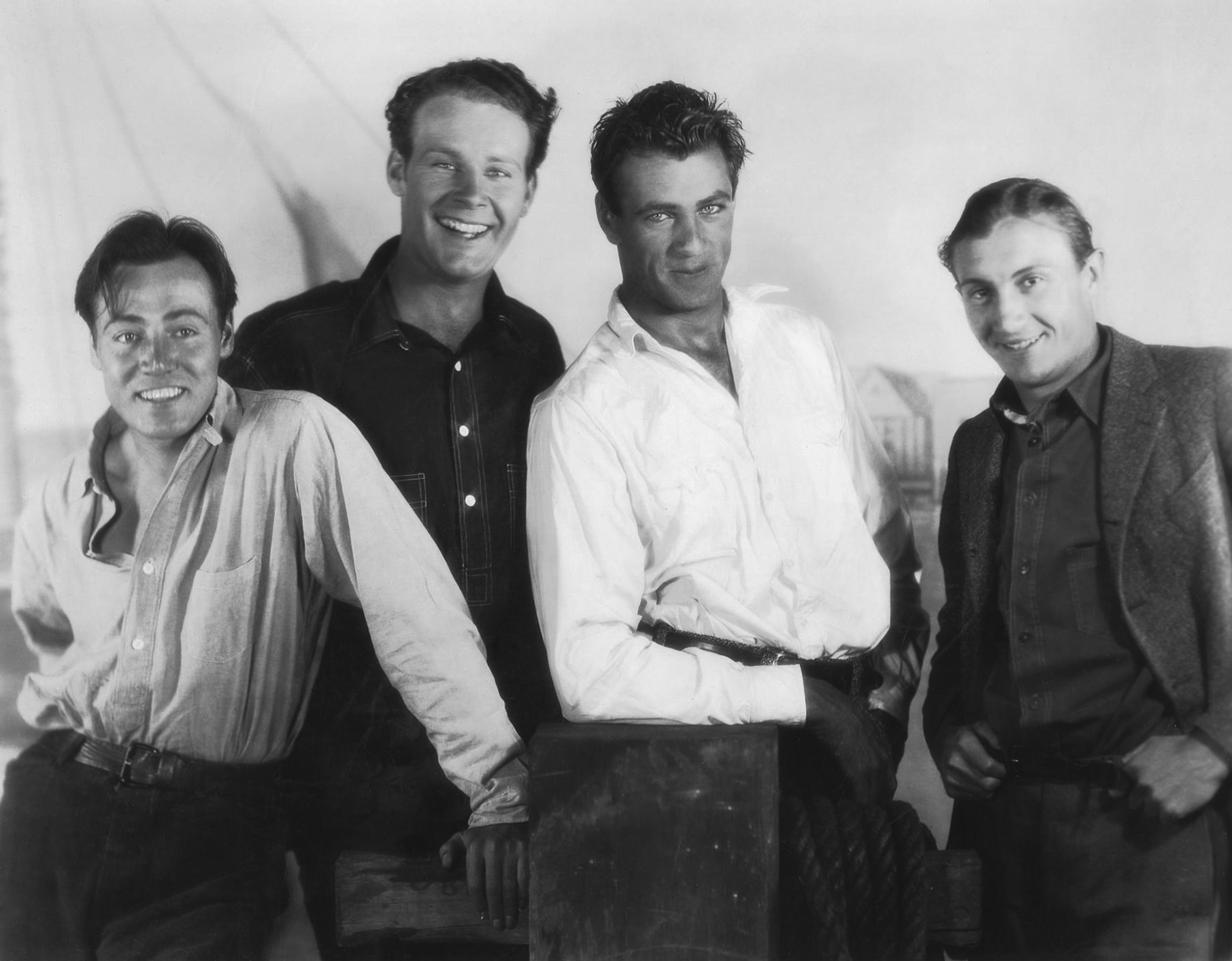
Leslie Fenton, Lane Chandler, Gary Cooper and director Rowland V. Lee

The First Kiss is a 1928 American sound romantic drama film directed by Rowland V. Lee and starring Fay Wray and Gary Cooper. While the film has no audible dialog, it features a synchronized musical score with sound effects and a theme song. Based on the short story Four Brothers by Tristram Tupper, the film is about a Chesapeake Bay fisherman who turns to pirating in order to be rich enough to marry a society girl.

The First Kiss was produced by Famous Players–Lasky and released by Paramount Pictures. Today it is considered to be a lost film. Some filming took place on the Chesapeake Bay in Saint Michaels, Maryland.

== Cast ==
- Fay Wray as Anna Lee
- Gary Cooper as Mulligan Talbot
- Lane Chandler as William Talbot
- Leslie Fenton as Carol Talbot
- Paul Fix as Ezra Talbot
- Malcolm Williams as Pap
- Monroe Owsley as Other Suitor

== Music ==
The film featured a theme song entitled “The First Kiss” which was composed by Al Dubin and J. Russell Robinson.
