= Loves of an Actress =

1928 film

- Theatrical release one-sheet poster
- Directed by: Rowland V. Lee
- Written by: Ernest Vajda; Rowland V. Lee; Julian Johnson
- Produced by: Jesse L. Lasky; Adolph Zukor
- Starring: Pola Negri; Nils Asther; Mary McAllister; Paul Lukas
- Cinematography: Victor Milner
- Edited by: Robert Bassler; E. Lloyd Sheldon
- Music by: Karl Hajos
- Production company: Paramount Pictures
- Distributed by: Paramount Pictures
- Release date: July 29, 1928
- Running time: 80 minutes (8 reels)
- Country: United States
- Language: Sound (Synchronized) (English Intertitles)

Loves of an Actress is a 1928 American synchronized sound romantic drama film directed by Rowland V. Lee and starring Pola Negri. While the film has no audible dialog, it was released with a synchronized musical score with sound effects using the sound-on-film Western Electric Sound System process. The film was produced by Adolph Zukor and Jesse Lasky with the distribution through Paramount Pictures.

== Plot ==
In a muddy village road in France, a peddler's wagon creaks forward through the mire. Inside are Felix, his wife, and their brood of children—including their youngest, Rachel. When the tiny bundle of a child tumbles from the back, she is scooped up by a kindly farmer and returned to the wagon, though her father grumbles that he has enough mouths to feed.

Years pass. Rachel has risen from obscurity to become a tragedienne of the French stage. At the Comédie Française, she gives a performance. Among the guests backstage are her three most persistent suitors: Richard Tucker as Baron Hartman, the wealthiest man in France; Philip Strange as Count Vareski, a nobleman with ties to Napoleon; and Paul Lukas as Dr. Durande, an influential newspaper magnate.

After the performance, Rachel evades her admirers by pretending exhaustion. Durande sees through the act but accepts her explanation—for now.

Rachel visits her family, the Felixes, and trains for her next role under the guidance of her acting coach, Samson. She is a woman of mystery—clever, passionate, and proud of her power to seduce.

In Marseilles, following another triumph, Rachel begins the journey back to Paris. Meanwhile, Nils Asther as Raoul Duval, a charming young nobleman destined for a diplomatic post in Russia, is preparing to leave an inn despite warnings of bandits. His traveling companions include Robert Fischer as Count Morency, a family friend, and Mary McAllister as Lisette, Morency's daughter, who is secretly in love with Raoul.

On the road, Raoul is ambushed—his horse tripped by a rope stretched by highwaymen. Stranded, he is rescued by a passing coach, inside which sits Rachel. She refuses to reveal her identity during the long ride, keeping Raoul at a romantic distance. But by the time they reach Paris, he is utterly enchanted. She cryptically tells him to attend the theatre if he wishes to see her again.

That night, Raoul attends the Comédie Française with Lisette and Count Morency. To his shock, the mysterious woman from the road is the celebrated actress onstage. Rachel, meanwhile, is equally drawn to the youthful sincerity of Raoul and plays her role directly to him. Love blossoms.

After the performance, they meet in secret, wandering into a moonlit park where Rachel surrenders to her feelings. For the first time, she vows to give up everything—her fame, her lovers, her power—for true love. She writes to Vareski and Hartman to end their affairs. But Durande, furious at being spurned, threatens to publish Rachel's passionate love letters in his paper.

Then Lisette pays Rachel a visit, pleading with her to release Raoul. Touched by the girl's innocence, Rachel makes the ultimate sacrifice. When Raoul arrives, she coldly tells him that she was only acting—that their romance meant nothing. Heartbroken and confused, Raoul leaves.

Rachel confronts Durande, explaining that exposing her past would only destroy Raoul's diplomatic future. Moved by her selflessness, Durande agrees not to publish the letters.

Back on stage, Rachel gives the performance of her lifetime, channeling the grief of lost love into her role. The audience is rapturous. In a poignant curtain speech, she tells them that her next "stage death" will be real—that her life is nearing its close.

At her villa in Le Canet, Rachel lies pale and still in bed, attended by Samson. She dies quietly.

The final image is of her funeral cortege. One of the wheels of the carriage turns slowly through the mire, echoing the opening image of her childhood journey. Among the mourners, Raoul and Lisette stand arm in arm, the past buried with Rachel.

== Cast ==
- Pola Negri as Rachel
- Nils Asther as Raoul Duval
- Mary McAllister as Lisette
- Richard Tucker as Baron Hartman
- Philip Strange as Count Vareski
- Paul Lukas as Dr. Durande
- Nigel De Brulier as Samson
- Robert Fischer as Count Moorency
- Helen Giere as Marie

== Music ==
The film featured a theme song entitled "Sunbeams (Bring Dreams of You)" which was composed by J. Keirn Brennan and Karl Hajos.

== Preservation ==
Loves of an Actress is currently presumed lost. In February of 2021, the film was cited by the National Film Preservation Board on their Lost U.S. Silent Feature Films list.

== See also ==
- List of early sound feature films (1926–1929)

== Bibliography ==
- Mariusz Kotowski. Pola Negri: Hollywood's First Femme Fatale. University Press of Kentucky, 2014.
