= Evelyn Selbie =

American actress (1871–1950)

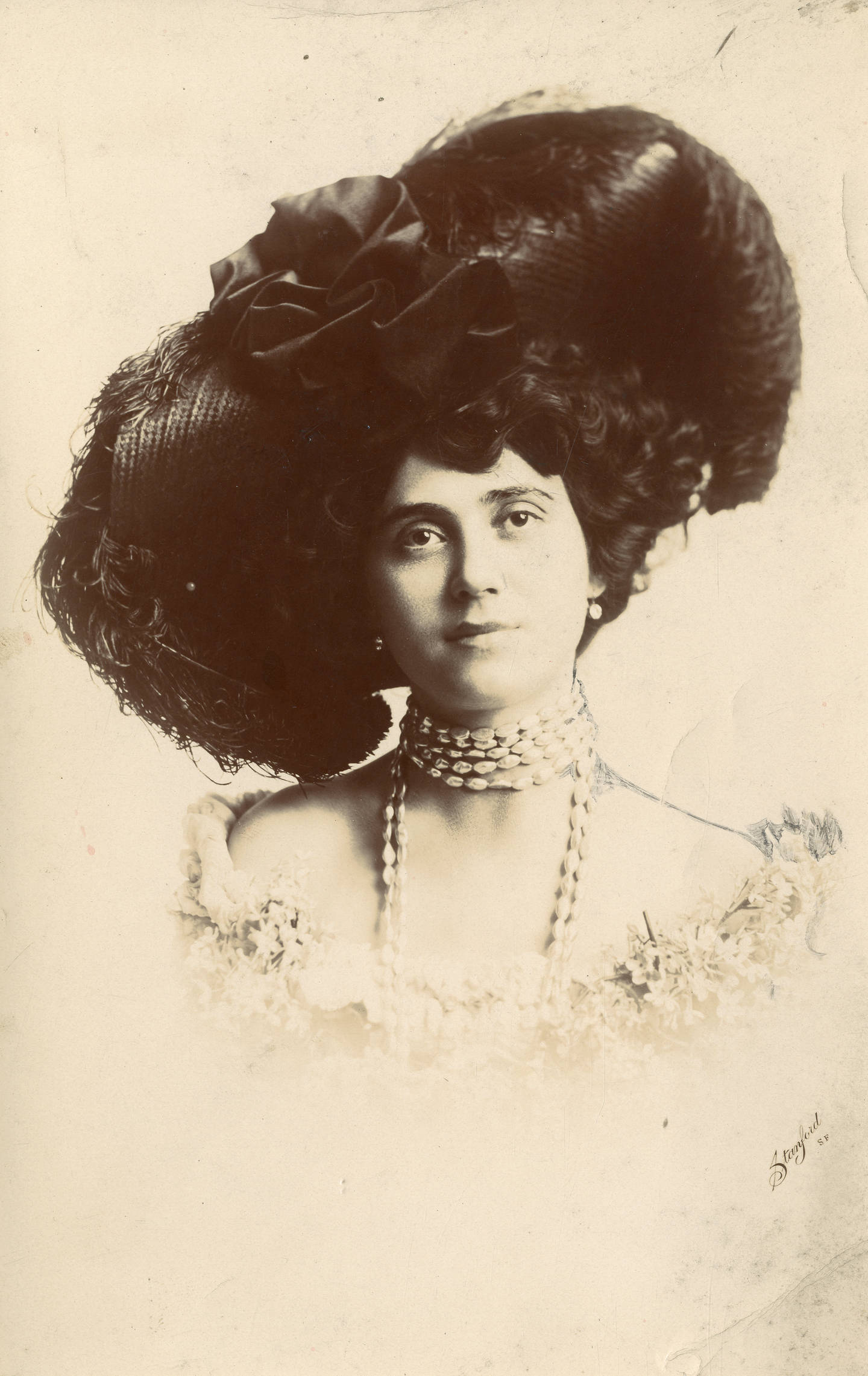
- Selbie in 1919
- Born: July 6, 1871; Louisville, Kentucky, U.S.
- Died: December 7, 1950 (aged 79); Woodland Hills, Los Angeles, U.S.
- Resting place: Inglewood Park Cemetery, Inglewood, California, U.S.
- Occupation: Actress
- Years active: 1916–1941

Evelyn Selbie (July 6, 1871 – December 7, 1950) was an American stage actress and performer in both silent and sound films.

== Biography ==
Born in Louisville, Kentucky, as a young woman Selbie was a sidesaddle rider. She had a career which lasted twenty-five years on the stage. She began in Proctor's stock companies in New York after leaving her home. She acted in plays like Human Hearts and The Cat and the Canary. In the former production she starred for two seasons. Selbie also acted in the stock theater company that operated at the Grand Theater in Reno, Nevada. Then she ventured west where she tenured 18 months at the old Central Theatre in San Francisco, California. This was followed by a season in stock in San Diego, California and then a long one in Alaska with T.D. Frawley. During the Alaska tour Evelyn alternated leads with Virginia Thornton.

In 1909, Selbie joined a vaudeville team, leaving the Bentley stock company.

Selbie began her motion picture career in 1912 with the Essanay Company as the leading lady of Broncho Billy Anderson and worked with that company nine years. Her silent movie credits include The Squaw Man, which was the first Hollywood production of Cecil B. De Mille. She continued in motion pictures until 1949 with The Doolins of Oklahoma, in which she played Birdie. She participated in the Fu Manchu film serials and did freelance work on radio.

On December 7, 1950, Selbie died at the Motion Picture Country Hospital in Los Angeles, California. She was 79. Selbie entered the Motion Picture Country Hospital two weeks after suffering a heart attack. The interment was at Inglewood Park Cemetery, Inglewood, California.

== Selected filmography ==
- The People vs. John Doe (1916) – Mrs. Doe
- The Price of Silence (1916) – Jenny Cupps
- The Mysterious Mrs. M (1917) – Mrs. Musselwhite
- The Terror (1917) – Mrs. Connelly
- The Voice on the Wire (1917, Serial) – Pale Ida
- The Flower of Doom (1917) – Arn Fun
- The Hand That Rocks the Cradle (1917) – Sarah
- The Flashlight (1917) – Mrs. Barclay
- Pay Me! (1917) – Hilda Hendricks
- Sirens of the Sea (1917) – Hadji
- The Grand Passion (1918) – Boston Kate
- The Two-Soul Woman (1918) – Leah
- Danger, Go Slow (1918) – Miss Witherspoon (uncredited)
- The Red Glove (1919) – Tiajuana
- Uncharted Channels (1920) – Elsa Smolski
- A Broadway Cowboy (1920) – Miss Howell
- Seeds of Vengeance (1920) – Martha Ryerson
- The Devil to Pay (1920) – Mrs. Roan
- The Broken Gate (1920) – Julia Delafield
- Devil Dog Dawson (1921)
- Without Benefit of Clergy (1921) – Ameera's mother
- The Devil Within (1921) – Witch
- Silver Spurs (1922) – Tehama
- The Half Breed (1922) – Mary
- Thorns and Orange Blossoms (1922) – Fallie, Rosita's Maid
- Omar the Tentmaker (1922) – Zarah
- The Tiger's Claw (1923) – Azun
- Snowdrift (1923) – Wananebish (prologue)
- The Broken Wing (1924) – Quichita
- Name the Man (1924) – Lisa Collister
- Flapper Wives (1924) – Hulda
- Poisoned Paradise: The Forbidden Story of Monte Carlo (1924) – Madame Tranquille
- Mademoiselle Midnight (1924) – Chiquita
- Romance Ranch (1924) – Tessa
- A Cafe in Cairo (1924) – Batooka
- The Prairie Pirate (1925) – Marie – Housekeeper (uncredited)
- Lord Jim (1925) – Sultan's Wife (uncredited)
- The Test of Donald Norton (1926) – Nee-tah-wee-gan
- Hell-Bent for Heaven (1926) – Meg Hunt – Sid's Mother
- Silken Shackles (1926) – Tade's Mother
- The Silver Treasure (1926) – Mother Teresa
- Flame of the Argentine (1926) – Nana
- Into Her Kingdom (1926) – Stepan's Mother
- The Country Beyond (1926) – Martha Leseur
- Prisoners of the Storm (1926) – Lillian Nicholson
- Rose of the Tenements (1926) – Sara Kaminsky
- Camille (1927) – Camille's Mother
- The King of Kings (1927) – (uncredited)
- Wings (1927) – Dressing Room Attendant (uncredited)
- The American (1927) (never-released widescreen film)
- Eager Lips (1927)
- Wild Geese (1927)
- Eternal Love (1929)
- The Mysterious Dr. Fu Manchu (1929)
- Love Comes Along (1930)
- Dangerous Paradise (1930)
- The Return of Dr. Fu Manchu (1930)
- Desert Vengeance (1931)
- Diamond Frontier (1940)
- White Eagle (1941)
