= Shirley of the Circus =

1922 film

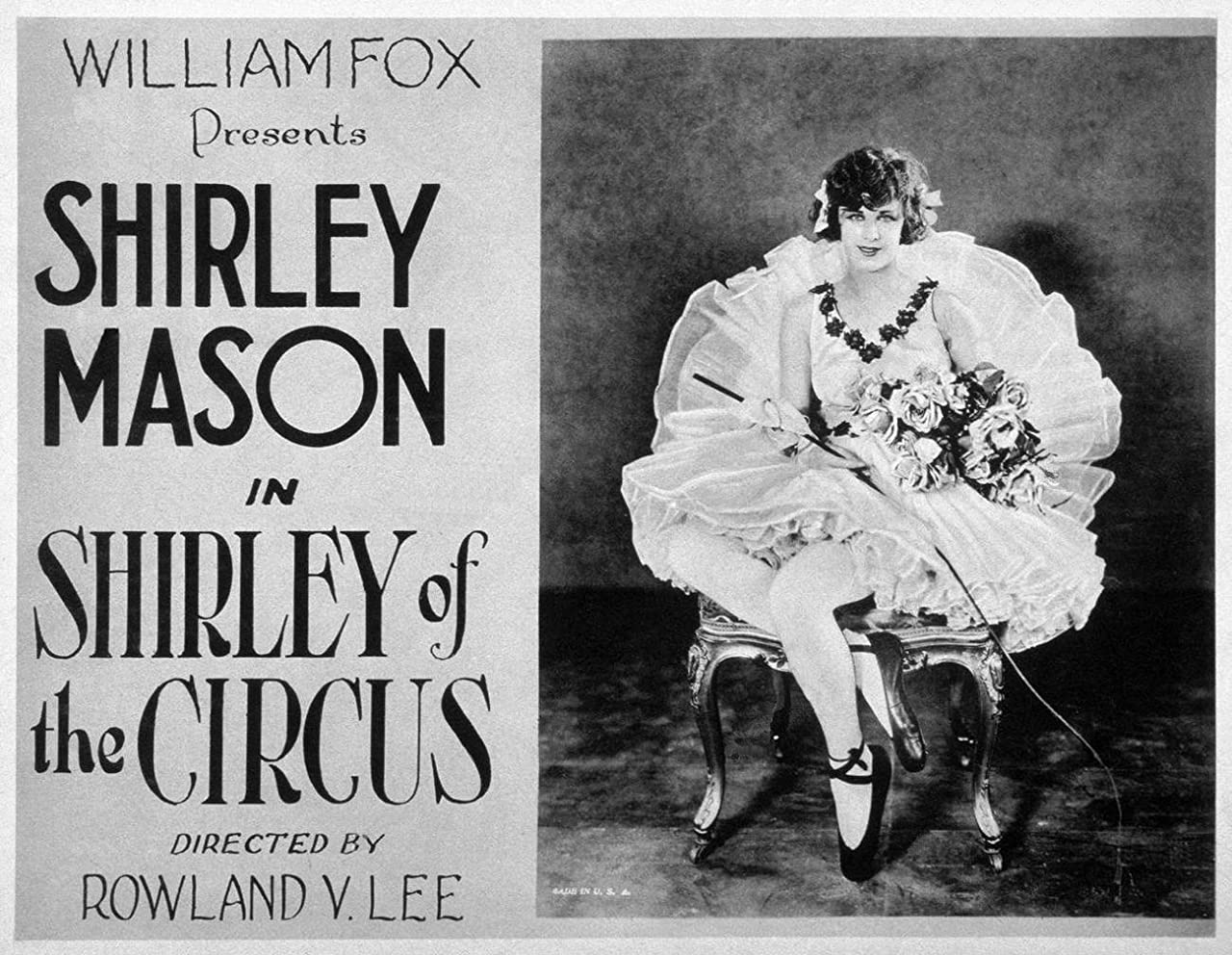
- Lobby card
- Directed by: Rowland V. Lee
- Screenplay by: Robert N. Lee
- Starring: Shirley Mason; George O'Hara; Crauford Kent; Alan Hale Sr. Lule Warrenton
- Cinematography: G.O. Post
- Production company: Fox Film Corporation
- Distributed by: Fox Film Corporation
- Release date: November 12, 1922
- Running time: 50 minutes
- Country: United States
- Language: Silent (English intertitles)

Shirley of the Circus is a 1922 American silent drama film directed by Rowland V. Lee, and starring Shirley Mason, George O'Hara, Crauford Kent, Alan Hale Sr., and Lule Warrenton. The film was released by Fox Film Corporation on November 12, 1922.

== Cast ==
- Shirley Mason as Nita
- George O'Hara as Pierre
- Crauford Kent as James Blackthorne
- Alan Hale Sr. as Max
- Lule Warrenton as Blanquette
- Maude Wayne as Susan Van Der Pyle
- Mathilde Brundage as Mrs. Van Der Pyle

== Preservation ==
The film is now considered lost.

== See also ==
- List of lost films
- 1937 Fox vault fire
