= Service de Luxe =

1938 film by Rowland V. Lee

- Directed by: Rowland V. Lee
- Written by: Vera Caspary; Bruce Manning; Gertrude Purcell; Leonard Spigelgass
- Produced by: Edmund Grainger
- Starring: Constance Bennett; Vincent Price; Charles Ruggles; Helen Broderick
- Cinematography: George Robinson
- Edited by: Ted J. Kent
- Music by: Charles Henderson
- Production company: Universal Pictures
- Distributed by: Universal Pictures
- Release date: October 12, 1938
- Running time: 85 minutes
- Country: United States
- Language: English

Service de Luxe is a 1938 American comedy film directed by Rowland V. Lee and starring Constance Bennett, Vincent Price (in his film debut) and Charles Ruggles.

== Plot ==
Helen Murphy, alias Dorothy Madison number 1, runs a very successful agency, "Dorothy Madison Services," for wealthy people who need someone to run their lives. A huge staff is up 24 hours a day to attend to all sorts of problems. Her alter ego, Pearl, alias Dorothy Madison 2, is there to assist Murphy, who dreams of finding a man who is able to run his own life.

Robert Wade, a young inventor from Albany, New York, leaves behind him five old aunts who tried to run his life. He comes to town to develop his tractor model. Murphy and Wade meet on the boat. Murphy is there on orders from Wade's uncle, who is a client of Madison Services, but she picks the wrong man to send back home, while she meets Wade and is instantly fascinated by him, although he thinks she's not a career girl, as well as being rather helpless.

When she discovers that the man she met on the boat was Wade, she has some problems how to manage this relationship. Her client Mr. Robinson is willing to finance Wade's tractor model and arranges a laboratory for him. Unfortunately, his daughter Audrey wants to marry Wade. While her father has adapted a kitchen in his library to be taught how to cook by Bibenko, Audrey tries to be in the basement laboratory with Wade. When it comes out that Bibenko is a Russian prince, Audrey finds he's the better husband-to-be. Wade marries Murphy, who leaves behind her career-girl life to become a wife.

== Cast ==
- Constance Bennett as Helen Murphy
- Vincent Price as Robert Wade
- Charles Ruggles as Mr. Robinson
- Helen Broderick as Pearl
- Mischa Auer as Bibenko
- Joy Hodges as Audrey Robinson
- Frances Robinson as Secretary
- Halliwell Hobbes as Butler
- Raymond Parker as Bellhop
- Frank Coghlan Jr. as Bellhop
- Lawrence Grant as Voroshinsky
- Nina Gilbert as Mrs. Devereaux
- Crauford Kent as Mr. Devereaux
- Lionel Belmore as Robert Wade (uncle)
- Chester Clute as Bridegroom
- Ben Hall as Yokel

== Bibliography ==
- Kellow, Brian. The Bennetts: An Acting Family. University Press of Kentucky, 2004.
