= Harry Fischbeck =

German-born cinematographer (1879–1968)

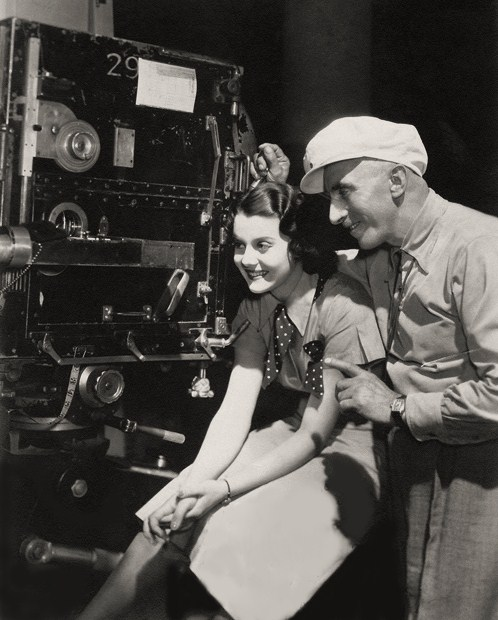
- With Olympe Bradna while shooting The Last Train from Madrid
- Born: June 3, 1879; Hanover, German Empire
- Died: May 28, 1968 (aged 88); Palm Springs, California, United States
- Occupation: Cinematographer
- Years active: 1914-1940 (film)

Harry Fischbeck (1879–1968) was a German-born cinematographer who emigrated to the United States where he worked in the American film industry. He was employed by a variety of different studios during his career including Universal, United Artists and Warner Brothers, but primarily for Paramount Pictures. One of his first credits was for the historical The Lincoln Cycle films directed by John M. Stahl.

== Selected filmography ==
- Life's Shop Window (1915)
- The Lincoln Cycle (1917)
- Wives of Men (1918)
- Her Code of Honor (1919)
- The Devil (1921)
- Nobody (1921)
- Disraeli (1921)
- You Find It Everywhere (1921)
- The Man Who Played God (1922)
- The Ruling Passion (1922)
- The Man from Beyond (1922)
- The Curse of Drink (1922)
- Mark of the Beast (1923)
- The Green Goddess (1923)
- Backbone (1923)
- Twenty Dollars a Week (1924)
- The Humming Bird (1924)
- Monsieur Beaucaire (1924)
- A Sainted Devil (1924)
- Cobra (1925)
- Sally of the Sawdust (1925)
- That Royle Girl (1925)
- Aloma of the South Seas (1926)
- Cabaret (1927)
- The World at Her Feet (1927)
- Serenade (1927)
- Honeymoon Hate (1927)
- Love and Learn (1928)
- The Secret Hour (1928)
- The Street of Sin (1928)
- His Tiger Lady (1928)
- The Fleet's In (1928)
- A Night of Mystery (1928)
- Dangerous Curves (1929)
- Marquis Preferred (1929)
- The Mysterious Dr. Fu Manchu (1929)
- Illusion (1929)
- The Canary Murder Case (1929)
- The Devil's Holiday (1930)
- Paramount on Parade (1930)
- A Man from Wyoming (1930)
- Only the Brave (1930)
- Ladies Love Brutes (1930)
- Her Wedding Night (1930)
- The Gang Buster (1931)
- The Age for Love (1931)
- Working Girls (1931)
- Lady and Gent (1932)
- Evenings for Sale (1932)
- If I Had a Million (1932)
- The Big Stampede (1932)
- The Night of June 13 (1932)
- Her Bodyguard (1933)
- The Eagle and the Hawk (1933)
- Big Executive (1933)
- Terror Aboard (1933)
- Limehouse Blues (1934)
- Search for Beauty (1934)
- Double Door (1934)
- Now and Forever (1934)
- No More Women (1934)
- Stolen Harmony (1935)
- Millions in the Air (1935)
- Timothy's Quest (1936)
- The Jungle Princess (1936)
- Border Flight (1936)
- Three Cheers for Love (1936)
- My American Wife (1936)
- The Crime Nobody Saw (1937)
- A Doctor's Diary (1937)
- King of Gamblers (1937)
- Night of Mystery (1937)
- John Meade's Woman (1937)
- The Last Train from Madrid (1937)
- Bulldog Drummond's Revenge (1937)
- Bulldog Drummond's Peril (1938)
- King of Alcatraz (1938)
- Prison Farm (1938)
- Persons in Hiding (1939)
- Grand Jury Secrets (1939)
- Television Spy (1939)
- Bulldog Drummond's Bride (1939)
- Unmarried (1939)
- Million Dollar Legs (1939)
- Parole Fixer (1940)
- Mystery Sea Raider (1940)

== Bibliography ==
- Bruce Babington & Charles Barr. The Call of the Heart: John M. Stahl and Hollywood Melodrama. Indiana University Press, 2018.
