= The Secret Hour (film) =

1928 film

- Lobby card
- Directed by: Rowland V. Lee
- Written by: Rowland V. Lee (scenario)
- Based on: play, They Knew What They Wanted, by Sidney Howard
- Produced by: Adolph Zukor; Jesse Lasky
- Starring: Pola Negri
- Cinematography: Harry Fischbeck
- Edited by: Robert Bassler
- Distributed by: Paramount Pictures
- Release date: February 4, 1928
- Running time: 80 minutes
- Country: USA
- Languages: Silent Version; Sound Version (Synchronized); English Intertitles

The Secret Hour is a lost 1928 silent film romance drama directed by Rowland V. Lee and starring Pola Negri. A sound version was released during the latter half of 1928. While the sound version of the film had no audible dialog, it featured a synchronized musical score with sound effects using both the sound-on-disc and sound-on-film process. It is based on the 1924 Broadway play, They Knew What They Wanted by Sidney Howard. It was produced by Paramount Famous Lasky Corporation and distributed through Paramount Pictures.

In 1956, the film entered the public domain in the United States because the claimants did not renew its copyright registration in the 28th year after publication.

== Cast ==
- Pola Negri - Amy
- Jean Hersholt - Tony
- Kenneth Thomson - Joe
- Christian J. Frank - Sam
- George Kuwa - Ah Gee
- George Periolat - Doctor

== Music ==
The sound version of the film featured a theme song entitled "The Beggar" with music by Ted Snyder and words by Francis Wheeler and Irving Kahal.

== See also ==
- A Lady to Love (1930)
- They Knew What They Wanted (1940)
