= The Mysterious Dr. Fu Manchu =

1929 film

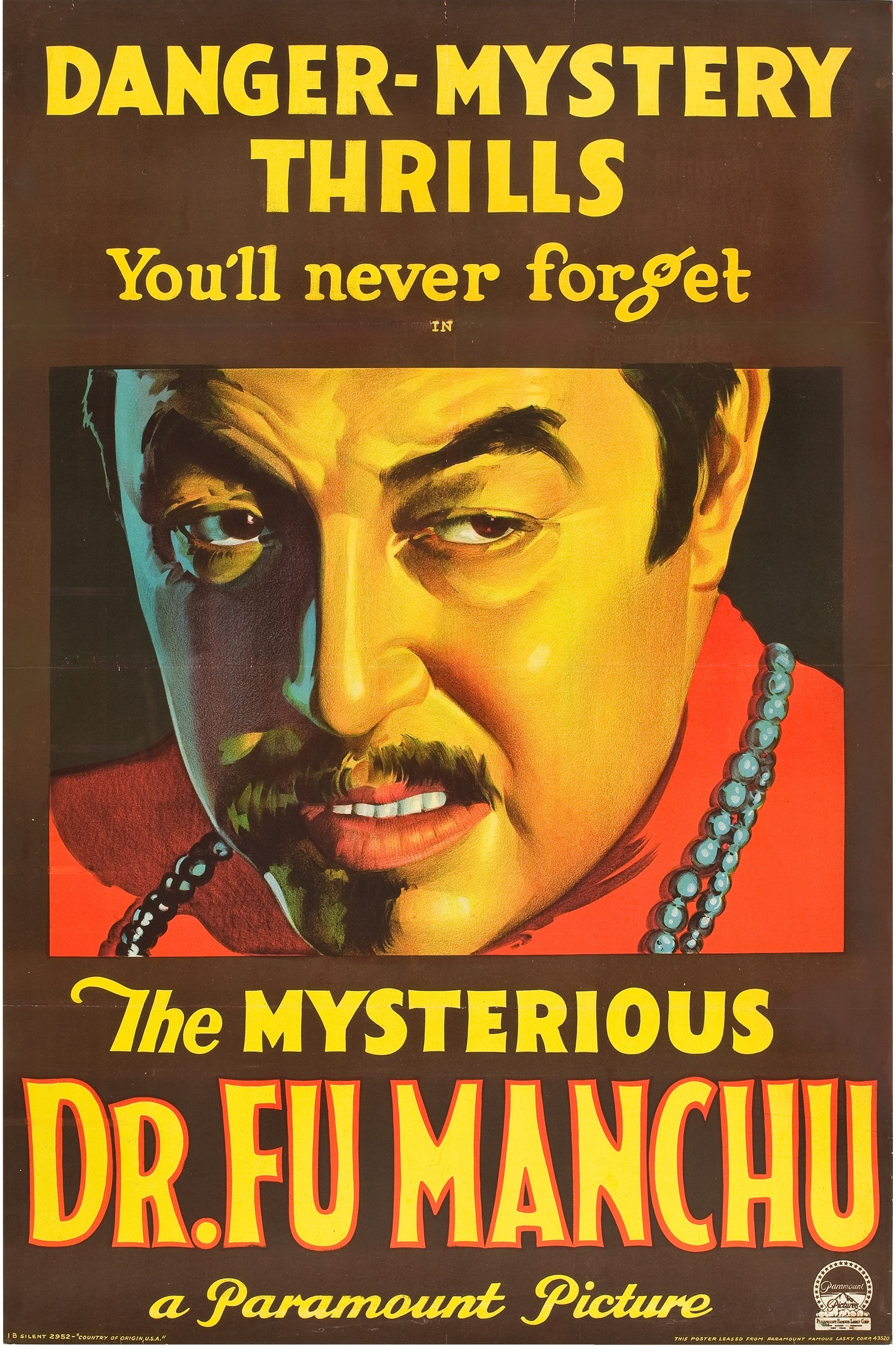
- Original film poster
- Directed by: Rowland V. Lee
- Written by: Lloyd Corrigan; Florence Ryerson; George Marion, Jr. (uncredited); Joseph L. Mankiewicz (uncredited)
- Based on: The Mystery of Dr. Fu-Manchu by Sax Rohmer
- Produced by: Rowland V. Lee
- Starring: Warner Oland; Neil Hamilton; Jean Arthur; O. P. Heggie
- Cinematography: Harry Fischbeck
- Edited by: George Nichols Jr.
- Music by: Oscar Potoker
- Production company: Paramount Pictures
- Distributed by: Paramount Pictures
- Release date: August 10, 1929
- Running time: 82 minutes
- Country: United States
- Language: English

The Mysterious Dr. Fu Manchu (1929)

The Mysterious Dr. Fu Manchu is a 1929 American pre-Code drama film directed by Rowland V. Lee and starring Warner Oland as Dr. Fu Manchu. It was the first Fu Manchu film of the talkie era. Since this was during the transition period to sound, a silent version was also released in the United States, although only the sound version exists today.

== Plot ==
A young white girl, Lia Eltham, is left in Fu Manchu's care. A British regiment, chasing Boxer rebels, fires on Fu Manchu's home, killing his wife and child. When Lia Eltham grows up, he uses her as an instrument for revenge, killing all descendants of those who killed his family. Opposing Fu Manchu are Police Inspector Nayland Smith and Dr. Jack Petrie.

== Cast ==
- Warner Oland as Dr. Fu Manchu
- Neil Hamilton as Dr. Jack Petrie
- Jean Arthur as Lia Eltham
- O. P. Heggie as Inspector Nayland Smith
- William Austin as Sylvester Wadsworth
- Claude King as Sir John Petrie
- Charles A. Stevenson as General Petrie
- Evelyn Selbie as Fai Lu
- Noble Johnson as Li Po
- Laska Winter as Fu Mela
- Wong Chung as Chinese Official (uncredited)
- Lawford Davidson as Clarkson (uncredited)
- Chappell Dossett as Reverend Mr. Eltham (uncredited)
- Charles Giblyn as Weymouth (uncredited)
- Donald MacKenzie as Trent (uncredited)
- Tully Marshall as Chinese Ambassador (uncredited)
- Evelyn Mills as Little Girl (uncredited)
- William J. O'Brien as Servant (uncredited)
- Charles Stevens as Singh (uncredited)
- USC Trojan Marching Band as Marching Band (uncredited)

== Production ==
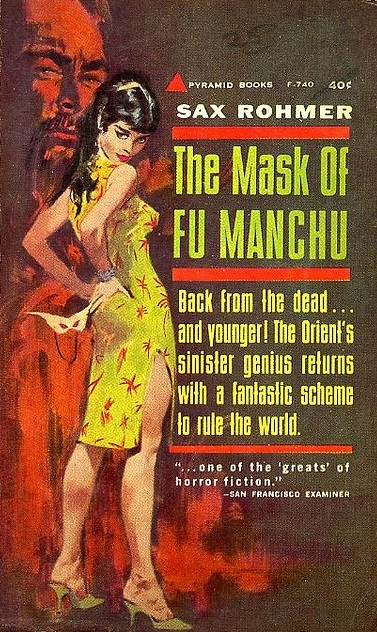
Cover of "The Mask of Fu Manchu" by Sax Rohmer. Illustration by Ronnie Lesser, 1962.

The film was very loosely based on the 1913 novel The Mystery of Dr. Fu-Manchu by Sax Rohmer. The lead character of the novel, Sir Nayland Smith, is played down in this film, and the secondary hero, Dr. Petrie, becomes the main character. Warner Oland, an actor of Swedish descent, was so believable in the role of Fu Manchu that he embarked on a career of playing Asian types throughout the 1930s, portraying the famous Asian detective Charlie Chan, until his death in 1938.

== Characterization ==
The Mysterious Dr. Fu Manchu incorporates several Yellow Peril stereotypes typical of that era in its portrayal of Fu Manchu, including his skillful use of poison, blow darts, and use of hypnosis to control a white woman throughout the film.

== Critical response ==
A review of the film in The New York Times reported that it "runs along smoothly over its various crimes and intended crimes without faltering on the way. Its climax is in the proper place and its comic relief is well situated," and that "Warner Oland [...] gives a good interpretation of his role." Variety reported that the film was "a first class mystery story, shrewdly built up with new twists [...] rich in surprises and suspense and splendidly acted and produced," and noted its "interesting bizarre atmosphere, attractive romance and neat touches of contrasting comedy."

== Sequels ==
Several of the actors portray the same roles in the 1930 sequel The Return of Dr. Fu Manchu, which was followed by the conclusion of the trilogy, the 1931 Daughter of the Dragon. Immediately after, MGM picked up the rights for the Fu Manchu character to produce their 1932 The Mask of Fu Manchu, a one-shot production which featured Boris Karloff in the title role.
