= The Return of Dr. Fu Manchu =

1930 film

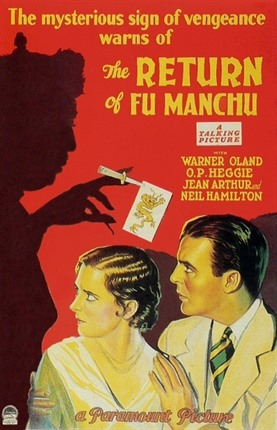
- Directed by: Rowland V. Lee
- Written by: Lloyd Corrigan; Florence Ryerson
- Based on: The Return of Dr. Fu Manchu by Sax Rohmer
- Produced by: Rowland V. Lee
- Starring: Warner Oland; O. P. Heggie; Jean Arthur; Neil Hamilton
- Cinematography: Archie Stout
- Production company: Paramount Pictures
- Distributed by: Paramount Pictures
- Release date: May 2, 1930
- Running time: 71-73 minutes
- Country: United States
- Language: English

The Return of Dr. Fu Manchu is a 1930 American pre-Code film directed by Rowland V. Lee. It is the second of three films starring Warner Oland as the fiendish Fu Manchu, who returns from apparent death in the previous film, The Mysterious Dr. Fu Manchu (1929), to seek revenge on those he holds responsible for the death of his wife and child. It was loosely adapted from the 1916 novel of the same name by Sax Rohmer.

== Plot ==
The Return of Dr. Fu Manchu (1930)

== Cast ==
- Warner Oland as Fu Manchu
- O. P. Heggie as Inspector Nayland Smith
- Jean Arthur as Lia Eltham
- Neil Hamilton as Dr. Jack Petrie
- Evelyn Hall as Lady Agatha Bartley
- William Austin as Sylvester Wadsworth
- Margaret Fealy as Lady Helen Bartley
- Shayle Gardner as Detective Harding
- Evelyn Selbie as Fai Lu
- Olaf Hytten as Deacon at Wedding (uncredited)

== Critical reception ==
The New York Times critic wrote, "melodramatic as the film is, it is not quite as exciting as its predecessor, The Mysterious Dr. Fu, in which Warner Oland did better work. O.P. Heggie as the inspector, Neil Hamilton as Petrie and Jean Arthur in the rôle of Lia are acceptable". A review of the film in Variety reported that "it's absurd [...] written down to the dumbest level in the audience mass," that it had an "awful literary quality," and "[b]est that can be said of this production is that the audience didn't laugh at its creepy sequences."
