= The Ruling Voice =

1931 film

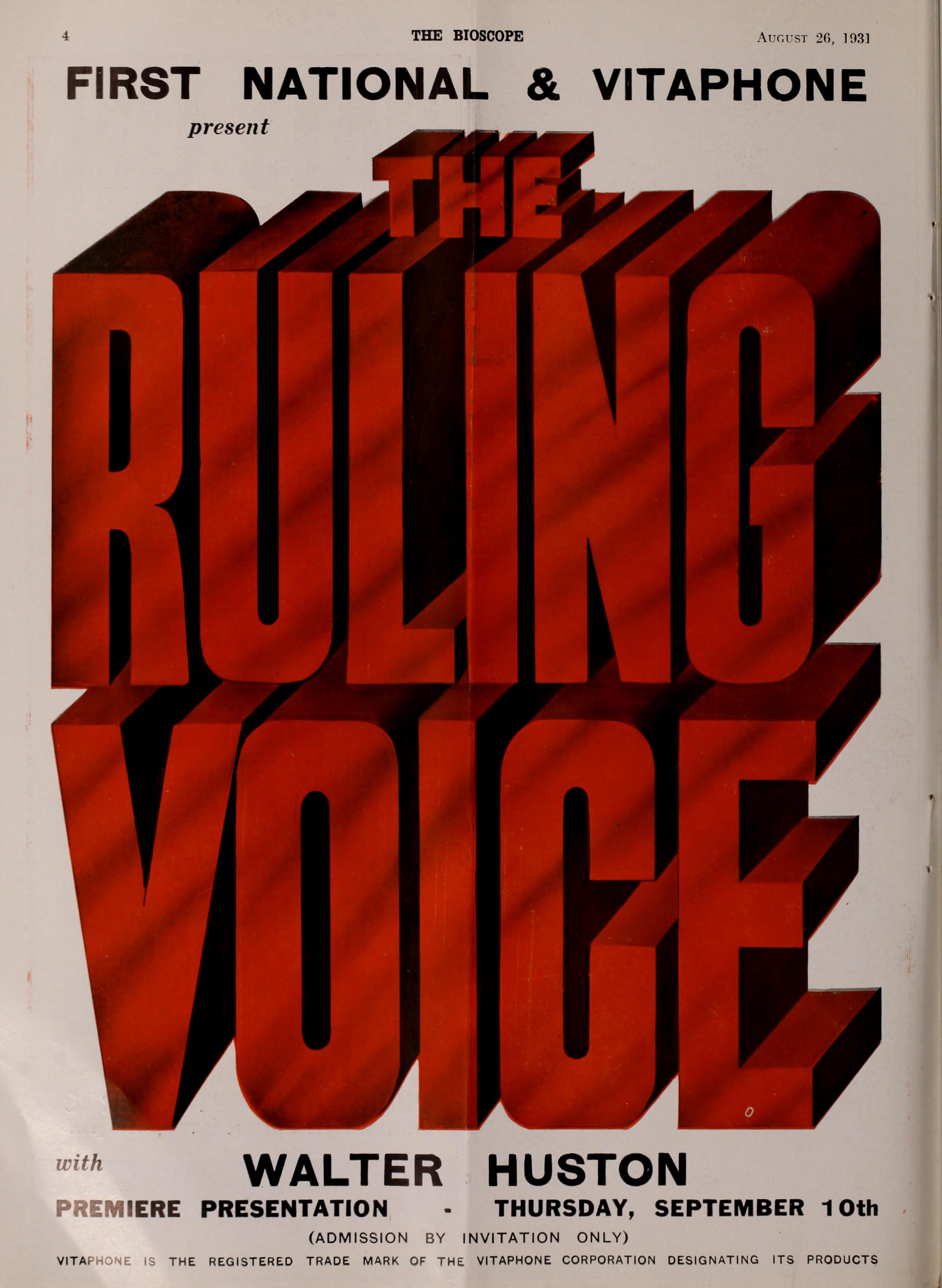
- Advertisement in a 1931 magazine
- Directed by: Rowland V. Lee
- Written by: Robert Lord (adaptation)
- Screenplay by: Byron Morgan
- Story by: Rowland V. Lee; Donald W. Lee
- Starring: Walter Huston; Loretta Young; Doris Kenyon
- Cinematography: Sol Polito
- Edited by: George Amy
- Music by: David Mendoza
- Production company: First National Pictures
- Distributed by: Warner Bros. Pictures
- Release date: October 31, 1931
- Running time: 76 minutes
- Country: United States
- Language: English

The Ruling Voice is a 1931 American pre-Code gangster drama film directed by Rowland V. Lee, starring Walter Huston, Loretta Young, and Doris Kenyon. It had an alternate title Upper Underworld, and was produced by First National Pictures and distributed by Warner Bros. Pictures.

== Cast ==
- Walter Huston as Jack Bannister
- Loretta Young as Gloria Bannister
- Dudley Digges as Abner Sneed
- David Manners as Dick Cheney
- Doris Kenyon as Mary Stanton
- John Halliday as Dexter Burroughs
- Willard Robertson as Ed Bailey
- Gilbert Emery as Andrew Gregory
- Douglas Scott as Malcolm Stanton

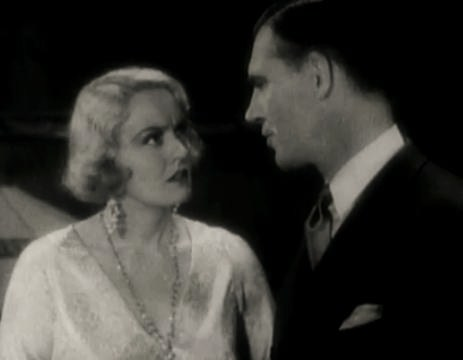
Doris Kenyon and Walter Huston

== Preservation ==
A copy of The Ruling Voice is preserved at the Library of Congress. The film had its copyright renewed and will enter the American public domain on January 1, 2027. (Note: Under R226207)
