= The Cup of Life (1921 film) =

1921 film by Rowland V. Lee

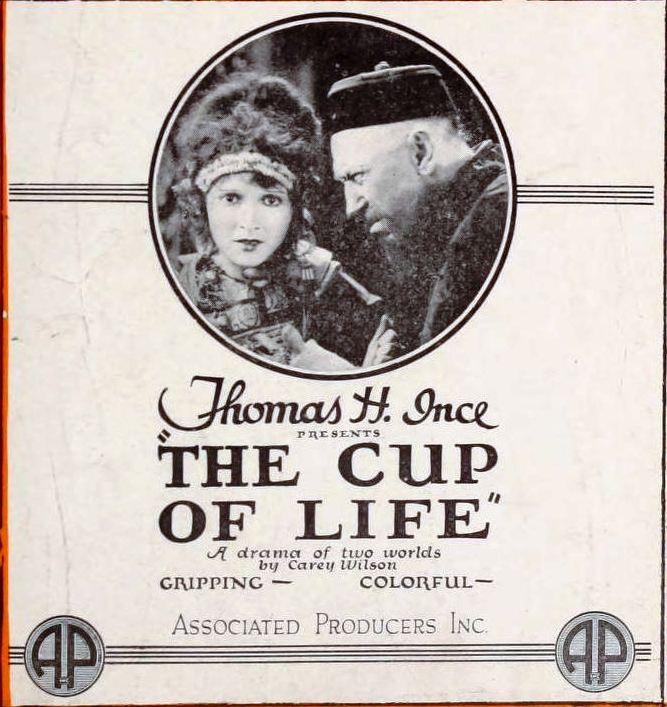
- Directed by: Rowland V. Lee
- Written by: Carey Wilson; Joseph F. Poland
- Produced by: Thomas H. Ince
- Starring: Niles Welch; Madge Bellamy; Hobart Bosworth
- Cinematography: G. O. Post; J. O. Taylor
- Production company: Thomas H. Ince Corporation
- Distributed by: Associated Producers
- Release date: August 7, 1921
- Running time: 60 minutes
- Country: United States
- Languages: Silent; English intertitles

The Cup of Life is a 1921 American crime drama film directed by Rowland V. Lee and starring Niles Welch, Madge Bellamy and Hobart Bosworth. A print of The Cup of Life exists.

== Plot ==
This is the plot summary from the Exhibitors Herald for October 21, 1921:

"The Cup of Life" is dramatic, swift, picturesque, clean and convincing. It tells a "bang up" yarn in vigorous, forceful incidents snugly strung together on the single taut thread of the plot. It should make much money for many exhibitors.

Hobart Bosworth makes his swashbuckling pearl pirate "a man for a' that." Tully Marshall's wily Chan Chang is ten-tenths Oriental. Madge Bellamy, as his white ward, and Xiles Welch, as the son of the pirate, satisfy plot and audience demands fully. The remainder of the cast is capable but unimportant.

In the story "Bully" Brand, pearl pirate, welcomes his son, who believes him his guardian, at Singapore, when he has completed his schooling. Chan Chang, powerful Oriental and foster father of Pain, a white girl, covets a pearl in Brand's possession which will complete Pain's marriage necklace. Roy, Brand's son. is given the pearl by his father and gives it to Pain, whom he has met secretly and learned to love. Chan identifies it in her possession, believes Brand has betrayed her, and arranges an enforced marriage to which Brand consents to protect his son. of whom he believes the worst. Roy intervenes, not knowing his father's identity, and father and son battle in darkness for the girl's hand and their respective lives.

The last situation is the biggest of many that are big. The finish is as satisfactory as it is unexpected. The whole constitutes six reels of brilliantly satisfying entertainment.

This synopsis was in the original Library of Congress copyright filing for the film:

Bully Brand, a daring and notorious pearl smuggler of Singapore, secures a wonderful pearl. Chan Chang, a wealthy Chinese merchant, who disposes of Brand's goods, offers him any price for the gem, wishing it for a necklace he is making for his adopted white daughter. Brand refuses to sell it, saying that he will use it some day to win an otherwise uncorruptible woman.

Brand's son, Warren Bradford, returns to Singapore from college, believing Brand to be his guardian. Because of his bad reputation, the father is loath to disclose the relationship.

Warren meets Pain, the adopted daughter of Chan Chang, and the apple of the old merchant's eye, and immediately falls in love with her. She tells him of the necklace, and the missing pearl which Chang is attempting to obtain to complete it.

Later, when Brand offers Warren any sort of a gift he may choose, the boy asks for the pearl, which the father is unable to refuse him. Warren immediately takes the pearl to Pain, who places it in her necklace.

Upon recognizing the pearl, Chang becomes furiously angry, remembering Brand's statement about the woman whom he would win with it. Believing Brand has wronged Pain, he sends for the smuggler and tells him he must marry Pain, under penalty of death. Neither Pain nor Brand reveal the truth, both attempting to protect Warren.

Brand attempts to escape, but is brought to the wedding room by Chang's men. Warren, hearing of the impending marriage but ignorant of the identity of the bridegroom, goes to Chang asking him to prevent the ceremony. The old Chinaman, seeing an opportunity for double revenge, plays one against the other. A terrific fight between the two results in the dark of the wedding room, but Brand discovers his assailant's identity, brings Chang to account and arranges the marriage between Warren and Pain.

== Cast ==
- Niles Welch as Roy Bradley or Warren Bradford
- Madge Bellamy as Pain
- Hobart Bosworth as 'Bully' Brand
- Tully Marshall as Chan Chang
- Monte Collins as Larry Donovan
- May Wallace as Mollie
