= Nostromo =

1904 novel by Joseph Conrad

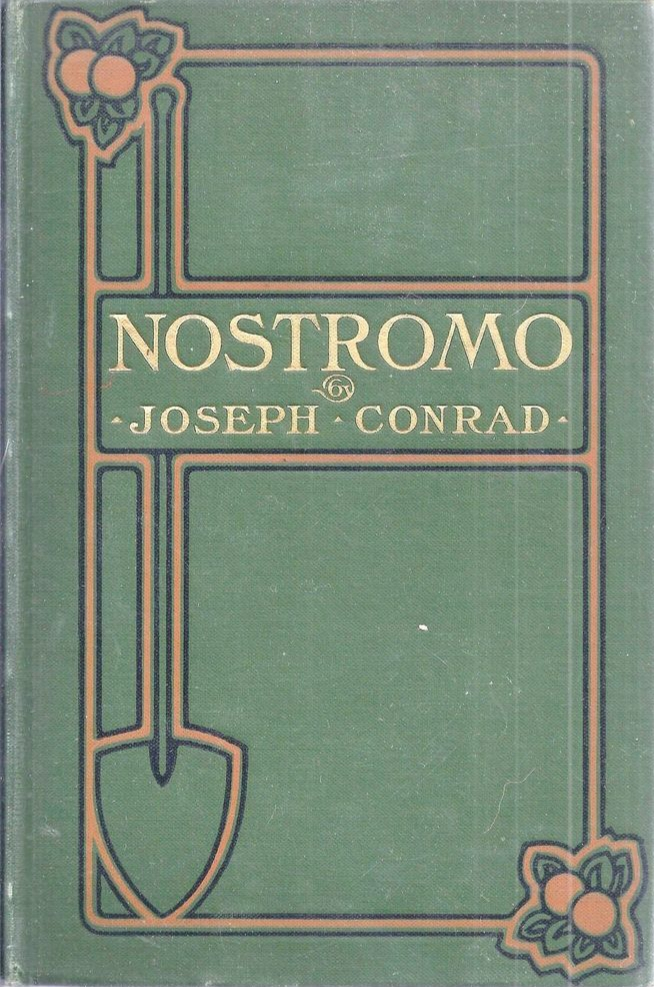
- First US edition
- Author: Joseph Conrad
- Language: English
- Genre: Novel
- Publisher: Harper & Bros
- Publication date: 1904
- Publication place: United Kingdom
- Text: Nostromo at Wikisource

Nostromo: A Tale of the Seaboard (1904) is a novel by Joseph Conrad, set in the fictitious South American republic of "Costaguana". First serialized in monthly installments of T.P.'s Weekly, in 1998 it was ranked 47th on the Modern Library 100 Best Novels in 20th-century English. It is often considered Conrad's best work of long fiction, and F. Scott Fitzgerald famously said, "I'd rather have written Nostromo than any other novel."

== Background ==
Conrad set his novel in the town of Sulaco, a port in the western region of the imaginary country Costaguana.

In his "Author's Note" to later editions of Nostromo, Joseph Conrad provides a detailed explanation of the inspirational origins of his novel. There he relates how, as a young man of about seventeen, while serving aboard a ship in the Gulf of Mexico, he heard the story of a man who had stolen, single-handedly, "a whole lighter-full of silver". As Conrad goes on to relate, he forgot about the story until some twenty-five years later when he came across a travelogue in a used-book shop in which the author related how he worked for years aboard a schooner whose master claimed to be that very thief who had stolen the silver.

== Plot summary ==
Nostromo is set in the fictional South American country of Costaguana, and more specifically in that country's Occidental Province and its port city of Sulaco. Though Costaguana is a fictional nation, its geography as described in the book resembles real-life Colombia. Costaguana has a long history of tyranny, revolution and warfare, but has recently experienced a period of stability under the dictator Ribiera.

Charles Gould is a native Costaguanero of English descent who owns an important silver-mining concession near the key port of Sulaco. He is tired of the political instability in Costaguana and its concomitant corruption, and uses his wealth to support Ribiera's government, which he believes will finally bring stability to the country after years of misrule and tyranny by self-serving dictators. Instead, Gould's refurbished silver mine and the wealth it has generated inspires a new round of revolutions and self-proclaimed warlords, plunging Costaguana into chaos. Among others, the forces of the revolutionary General Montero invade Sulaco after securing the inland capital. Gould, adamant that his silver mine should not become spoil for his enemies, orders Nostromo, the trusted "Capataz de Cargadores" (Head Longshoreman) of Sulaco, to take the mine's most recent load of silver offshore, and arranges for the mine complex to be destroyed by dynamite if the coup leaders try to take it.

Nostromo is an Italian expatriate who has risen to his position through his bravery and daring exploits. ("Nostromo" is Italian for "shipmate" or "boatswain"). Nostromo's real name is Giovanni Battista Fidanza —Fidanza meaning "trust" in archaic Italian.

Nostromo is a commanding figure in Sulaco, respected by the wealthy Europeans and seemingly limitless in his abilities to command power among the local population. He is, however, never admitted to become a part of upper-class society, but is instead viewed by the rich as their useful tool. He is believed by Charles Gould and his own employers to be incorruptible, and it is for this reason that Nostromo is entrusted with removing the silver from Sulaco to keep it from the revolutionaries. Accompanied by the young journalist Martin Decoud, Nostromo sets off to smuggle the silver out of Sulaco. However, the lighter on which the silver is being transported is struck at night in the waters off Sulaco by a transport carrying the invading revolutionary forces under the command of Colonel Sotillo. Nostromo and Decoud manage to save the silver by putting the lighter ashore on Great Isabel. Decoud and the silver are deposited on the deserted island of Great Isabel in the expansive bay off Sulaco, while Nostromo scuttles the lighter and manages to swim back to shore undetected. Back in Sulaco, Nostromo's power and fame continues to grow as he daringly rides over the mountains to summon the army which ultimately saves Sulaco's powerful leaders from the revolutionaries and ushers in the independent state of Sulaco. In the meantime, left alone on the deserted island, Decoud eventually loses his mind. He takes the small lifeboat out to sea and there shoots himself, after first weighing his body down with some of the silver ingots so that he would sink into the sea.

His exploits during the revolution do not bring Nostromo the fame he had hoped for, and he feels slighted and used. Feeling that he has risked his life for nothing, he is consumed by resentment, which leads to his corruption and ultimate destruction, for he has kept secret the true fate of the silver after all others believed it lost at sea. He finds himself becoming a slave of the silver and its secret, even as he slowly recovers it ingot by ingot during nighttime trips to Great Isabel. The fate of Decoud is a mystery to Nostromo, which combined with the fact of the missing silver ingots only adds to his paranoia. Eventually a lighthouse is constructed on Great Isabel, threatening Nostromo's ability to recover the treasure in secret. The ever resourceful Nostromo manages to have a close acquaintance, the widower Giorgio Viola, named as its keeper. Nostromo is in love with Giorgio's younger daughter, but ultimately becomes engaged to his elder daughter Linda. One night while attempting to recover more of the silver, Nostromo is shot and killed, mistaken for a trespasser by old Giorgio.

== Major characters ==
- Nostromo (or Giovanni Battista Fidanza) – a charismatic Italian seaman who has settled in Sulaco and established a reputation for leadership and daring; as an employee of the Oceanic Steam Navigation Company, he earns the unofficial title of the "Capataz de Cargadores", or "Head Longshoreman"
- Charles "don Carlos" Gould, known as the "King of Sulaco" – an Englishman by ancestry and temperament, he is nevertheless a third generation Costaguanero; owner of the San Tomé Silver Mine, a bequest from his late father who was forced into ownership of the then derelict mine as repayment for many forced loans made to the corrupt government of Guzman Bento; the mine becomes his single-minded obsession
- Mrs. "dona Emilia" Gould – the English-born wife of Charles Gould; an altruistic and refined woman of strong will but who ultimately finds herself second to the mine in her husband's attentions
- Dr. Monygham – a misanthropic and taciturn English doctor and long-time resident of Costaguana; rumours swirl about him regarding his past involvement in political plots
- Martin Decoud – a Costaguanero who has spent much of his time in Paris and considers himself a European by temperament if not birth; he returns to Costaguana and becomes an outspoken journalist and editor of the progressive newspaper Porvenir ("The Future"); initially a cynic, he becomes the intellectual force behind the idea of independence for the Occidental Province of Costaguana; he is also in love with Antonia Avellanos
- Don José Avellanos – the patriarch of one of the most prominent families of Sulaco and a close confidant of Charles Gould; he suffered greatly under the dictatorship of Guzman Bento and now has complete allegiance to Gould
- Antonia Avellanos – a highly educated and cosmopolitan daughter of Don José; held in awe by the other young women of Sulaco
- Giorgio Viola – an exiled Italian revolutionary who once fought alongside Garibaldi but who is now an innkeeper in Sulaco and the father of two daughters
- Teresa Viola – the wife of Giorgio Viola
- Linda Viola – the eldest daughter of Teresa and Giorgio; she is in love with Nostromo
- Giselle Viola – the youngest daughter of Teresa and Giorgio
- Captain Joseph "Fussy Joe" Mitchell – the English Superintendent of the Oceanic Steam Navigation Company's offices in Sulaco and supervisor of Nostromo
- President don Vincente Ribiera – Costaguana's first civilian head of state, who takes over after the overthrow of the tyrannical Guzman Bento; a member of the landed aristocracy; corpulent to the point of infirmity; highly respected abroad and full of good intentions, and many of the characters, including Charles Gould, place their hopes in his ability to bring democracy and stability to Costaguana
- Guzman Bento – a former dictator of Costaguana whose death some years before the novel opens had ushered in a renewed period of political and economic instability; the period of his rule was a dark and bloody chapter in the history of Costaguana
- General Montero – an early supporter of Ribiera; a self-made man from peasant stock; he manages to muster an army of supporters to eventually overthrow Ribiera
- Pedro Montero – the younger brother of General Montero
- Senor Hirsch – a Jewish hide merchant who finds himself in Sulaco at the time of the political upheavals that comprise most of the novel
- Colonel Sotillo – the commander of a military unit in Esmeralda, up the coast from Sulaco; he abandons the Ribiera regime and joins the uprising of General Montero and is the first to arrive in Sulaco after the fall of the Ribiera government; his loyalties, however, are soon consumed by a mad desire to get hold of the silver of the San Tomé Mine
- Holroyd – wealthy American industrialist and financier of the San Tomé Mine
- Hernandez – leader of a gang of bandits
- Father Roman – Catholic Priest, chaplain to miners, former military padre, and Hernandez's "bandit chaplain"
- Father Corbelán – Catholic Priest, Don José's brother-in-law, and eventually Cardinal Archbishop of Sulaco
- General Barrios – commander of the military in the Occidental Province
- Don Pepe – the manager of the San Tomé Silver Mine under Charles Gould; under Gould's orders, he is prepared to blow up the mine rather than let it fall into the hands of the Montero forces

== Adaptations and translations ==
Fox Film produced a lavish silent film version in 1926 called The Silver Treasure directed by Rowland V. Lee and starring George O'Brien. It is now a lost film.

In 1991, British director David Lean was to film the story of Nostromo, with Steven Spielberg producing it for Warner Bros., but Lean died a few weeks before the principal photography was to begin in Almería. Marlon Brando, Paul Scofield, Peter O'Toole, Isabella Rossellini, Christopher Lambert, Dennis Quaid and Alexei Sayle had all been set to star in this adaptation, along with Georges Corraface in the title role.

In 1996, a television adaptation Nostromo was produced. It was adapted by John Hale and directed by Alastair Reid for the BBC, Radiotelevisione Italiana, Televisión Española, and WGBH Boston. It starred Claudio Amendola as Nostromo, and Colin Firth as Señor Gould.

The novel was translated to Polish for the first time in 1928 by Stanisław Wyrzykowski. It received several other translations to Polish: in 1972 by Jadwiga Korniłowiczowa, in 1981 by Jan Józef Szczepański and in 2023 by Maciej Świerkocki.

== References in other works ==
- Andrew Greeley's novel Virgin and Martyr (1985) has much of the story set in the fictional country of Costaguana. Many of the place names are borrowed from Conrad's novel.
- In Ridley Scott's Alien (1979), the spacecraft is named the Nostromo; the escape vessel is named Narcissus, an allusion to another of Conrad's works, The Nigger of the "Narcissus". In James Cameron's sequel Aliens (1986), the Marine transport vessel is named Sulaco. Furthermore, appearing in the video game Aliens: Colonial Marines, a vessel of the same class as the Sulaco is named the Sephora, a reference to Conrad's The Secret Sharer. In the later sequel Alien: Romulus (2024), the mining hauler is named Corbelan.
- In Dean Koontz's novel Fear Nothing (1998), the protagonist Christopher Snow visits a man named Roosevelt Frost, who lives aboard a boat named Nostromo.
- In the Warhammer 40,000 science fantasy franchise, "Nostramo" ("nostramo" is Catalan for "nostromo", "shipmate" or "boatswain"), is the name of a corruption-ridden city world covered in unending darkness. Nostramo eventually falls under control of a brutal serial killer demigod named Konrad Curze, an allusion to the name of a central character in Conrad's novella Heart of Darkness, later used by Francis Ford Coppola as the base for the film Apocalypse Now.
- Colombian writer Juan Gabriel Vásquez's novel The Secret History of Costaguana (2007) narrates the secession of Panamá from Colombia as the background story that (in this fictional work) served as Conrad's inspiration for Nostromo.
- In the USA Network series Colony, the fighters of the Resistance use copies of the book as a decoder key for their encrypted communications.
- The travel writer John Gimlette suggests in his At the Tomb of the Inflatable Pig: Travels through Paraguay (2003) that there are many similarities to Paraguay and its 19th-century history of despotism, war, and revolution: "Conrad, meanwhile, was absorbing the Paraguayan story. His nightmarish political novel, Nostromo, emerged in 1904. It is Paraguay, seen through the prisms of his great friend's anger – Napoleonic dictators and a Great Conspiracy. There is even 'a barefoot army of scarecrows' and a priest who becomes the state torturer." Graham arrived in Paraguay in 1873 and wrote many books on it.

== See also ==
- Politics in fiction
