= His Back Against the Wall =

1922 film

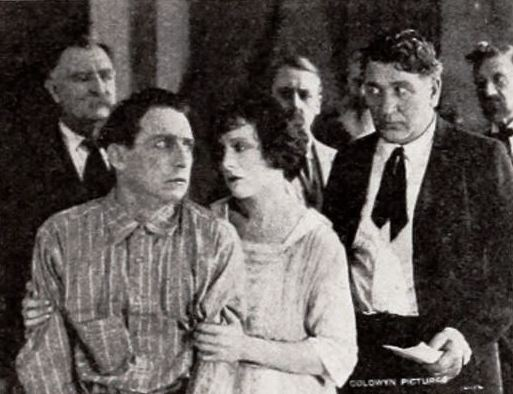
- Film still
- Directed by: Rowland V. Lee
- Screenplay by: Julien Josephson
- Story by: John Frederick
- Starring: Raymond Hatton; Virginia Valli; Will Walling; J. Gordon Russell; W.H. Bainbridge; Virginia Madison
- Cinematography: Max Fabian
- Production company: Goldwyn Pictures
- Distributed by: Goldwyn Pictures
- Release date: May 21, 1922
- Running time: 50 minutes
- Country: United States
- Language: Silent (English intertitles)

His Back Against the Wall is a 1922 American comedy film directed by Rowland V. Lee and written by Julien Josephson. The film stars Raymond Hatton, Virginia Valli, Will Walling, J. Gordon Russell, W.H. Bainbridge and Virginia Madison. The film was released on May 21, 1922, by Goldwyn Pictures.

== Cast ==
- Raymond Hatton as Jeremy Dice
- Virginia Valli as Mary Welling
- Will Walling as Sheriff Lawrence
- J. Gordon Russell as Bronc Lewis
- W.H. Bainbridge as Henry Welling
- Virginia Madison as Mrs. Welling
- Fred Kohler as Arizona Pete
- Jack Curtis as Lew Shaler
- Dudley Hendricks as Dr. Farley
- Shannon Day as Dorothy Petwell
- Raymond Cannon as Jimmy Boyle
- Louis Morrison as Foutch

== Preservation status ==
- The film survives in the MGM Library.
