= Havoc (1925 film) =

1925 film

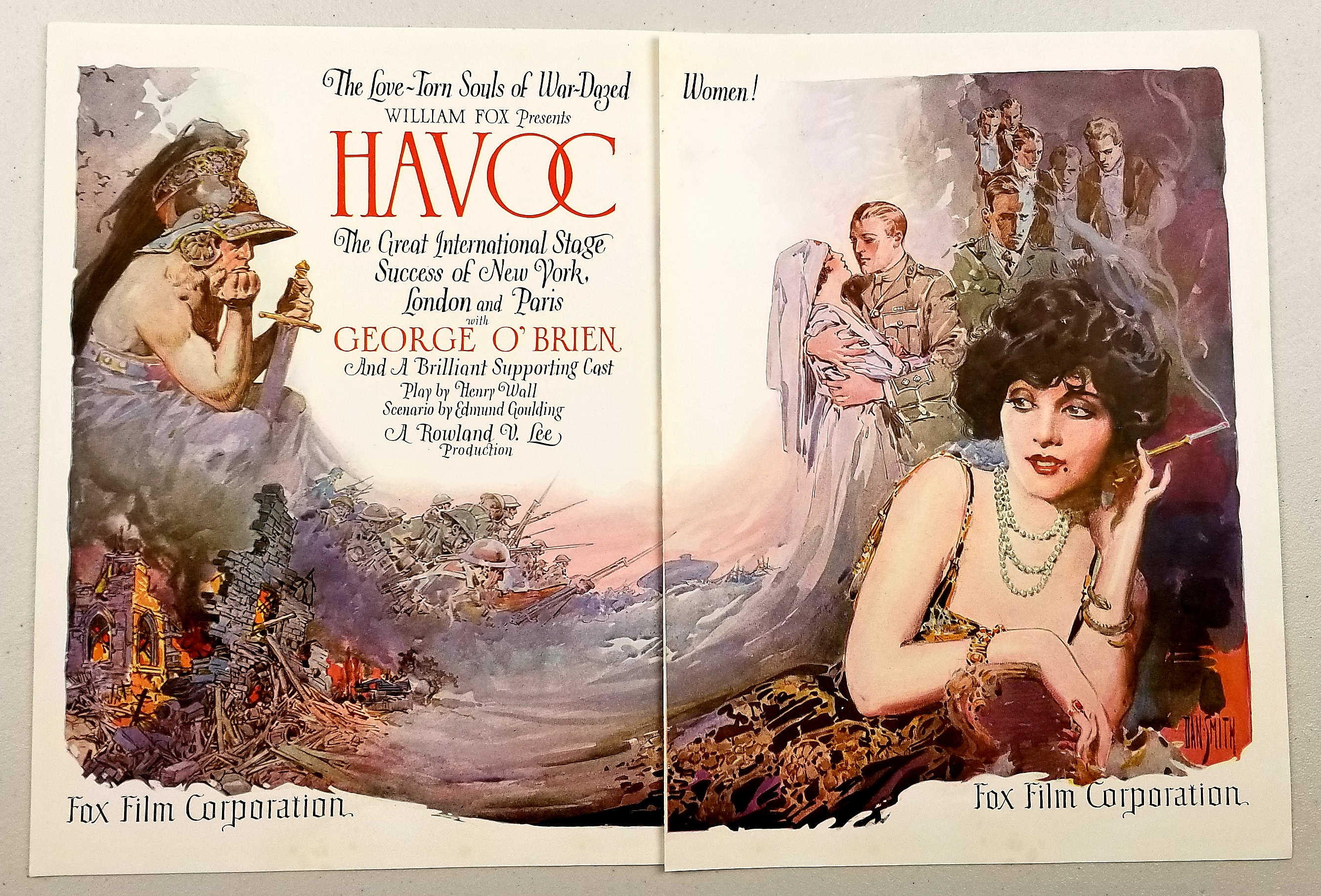
- Directed by: Rowland V. Lee
- Written by: Edmund Goulding
- Based on: Havoc by Henry Wall
- Produced by: William Fox
- Starring: Madge Bellamy; George O'Brien; Walter McGrail
- Cinematography: G.O. Post
- Production company: Fox Film
- Distributed by: Fox Film
- Release date: September 27, 1925
- Running time: 9 reels
- Country: United States
- Language: Silent (English intertitles)

Havoc is a 1925 American silent war drama film directed by Rowland V. Lee and starring Madge Bellamy, George O'Brien, and Walter McGrail.

== Plot ==
As described in a film magazine reviews, in England before the outbreak of the First World War, Captain Roddy Dunton and Lieutenant Dick Chappel court the same woman, Violet Deering. She becomes engaged to Dunton, and Chappel accepts her choice. On leave from the British Army on the Western Front, Chappel brings Violet a message from Dunton. Violet infatuates him and Dunton's sister Tessie sees them embrace. Violet, trapped, breaks her engagement with Dunton. When Chappel returns to the trenches, Dunton, angered, persuades Chappel to take part in a reckless attack on the German lines, hoping he will be killed. Instead, the brave Chappel is badly wounded. Later, full of remorse, Dunton shoots himself, committing suicide. Chappel returns home where he denounces Violet and is nursed back to health by Dunton's sister Tessie.

== Cast ==
- Madge Bellamy as Tessie Dunton
- George O'Brien as Dick Chappel
- Walter McGrail as Roddy Dunton
- Eulalie Jensen as Alice Deering
- Margaret Livingston as Violet Deering
- Leslie Fenton as Babe
- David Butler as Smithy
- Harvey Clark as Biddle
- Wade Boteler as Sergeant Major
- Edythe Chapman as Mrs. Chappel
- E.H. Calvert as Regimental Adjutant
- Bertram Grassby as Alexi Betskoy

== Censorship ==
Before Havoc could be exhibited in Kansas, the Kansas Board of Review required the removal of a closeup of a liquor bottle and flask, Violet smoking and in a negligee, a drunken soldier in mud, a man kissing Violet on the shoulder, and the reel 8 intertitle "Shut up - damn you - shut up!"

== Bibliography ==
- Solomon, Aubrey. The Fox Film Corporation, 1915-1935: A History and Filmography. McFarland, 2011.
