= His Own Law =

1920 film

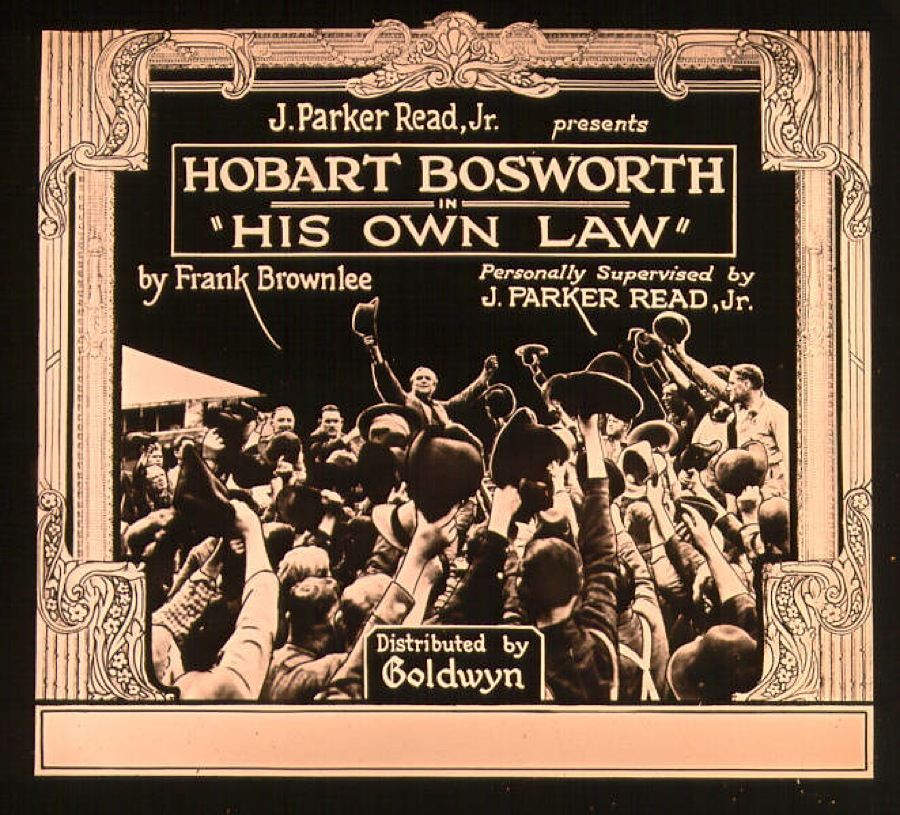
- Lantern slide
- Directed by: J. Parker Read, Jr.
- Written by: Frank Brownlee (story); E. Magnus Ingleton (scenario)
- Produced by: J. Parker Read, Jr.
- Starring: Hobart Bosworth
- Cinematography: G.O. Post
- Distributed by: Goldwyn Pictures
- Release date: September 1, 1920
- Running time: 7 reels
- Country: United States
- Language: Silent (English intertitles)

His Own Law

His Own Law is a 1920 American silent drama film, produced and directed by J. Parker Read, Jr., and released by Goldwyn Pictures. Starring Hobart Bosworth, the film survives in the Library of Congress.

== Plot ==
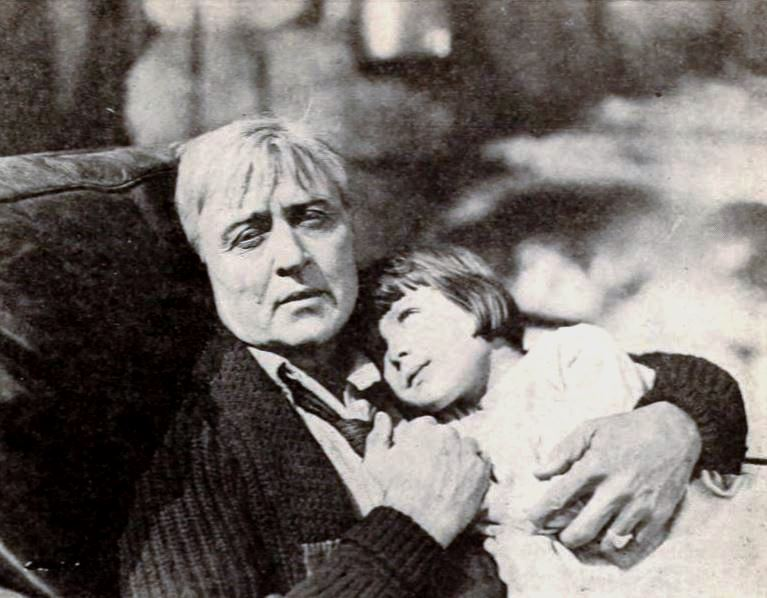
His Own Law, 1920

As summarized in a Film Daily, J.C. MacNeir (Hobart Bosworth), a construction engineer of repute, becomes attached to young French engineer Jean Saval (Rowland V. Lee), whom he meets during one of the drunken sprees he indulges in between jobs. After a night spent in cheap lodging, MacNeir takes Saval home with him and then to the next job in Chinook. Here Saval falls in love with Sylvia Harris (Jean Calhoun). After he is suddenly called up for French military service, and with no one to marry them, Saval pledges his faith and gives Sylvia a wedding ring. When MacNeir hears that Saval has been killed in battle, he marries Sylvia so that his friend's child will have a name and father. They are happy together as Saval becomes less distinct in Sylvia's memory. Then, after four years in a German prison, Saval returns and initially denounces MacNeir, who has sacrificed everything to protect Sylvia and her child. Saval gradually learns the truth and, convinced that Sylvia loves MacNeir, determines to leave. MacNeir says that he must be the one to go and, although he is very much in love with Sylvia, tells "Frenchy" that he has always considered Sylvia to be Saval's wife. The two men decide to leave the decision to the woman. Although she has tremendous regard for MacNeir, Sylvia's heart forces her to choose Saval. MacNeir congratulates the two of them through his tears.

== Cast ==
- Hobart Bosworth - J.C. MacNeir
- Rowland V. Lee - Jean Saval
- Jean Calhoun - Sylvia

unbilled

- Frank Brownlee
