= A Thousand to One =

1920 film by Rowland V. Lee

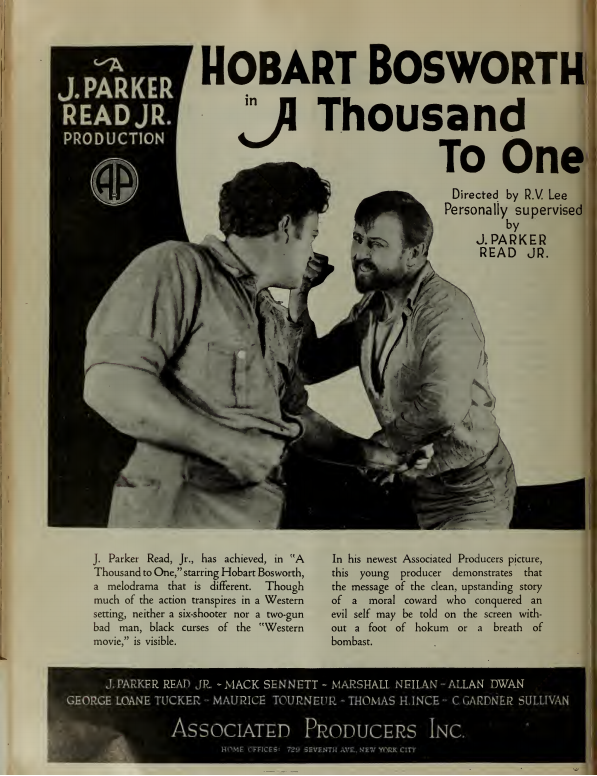
- Directed by: Rowland V. Lee
- Written by: Max Brand; Joseph F. Poland
- Starring: Hobart Bosworth; Ethel Grey Terry; Charles West
- Cinematography: J.O. Taylor
- Edited by: Ralph Dixon
- Production company: J. Parker Read Jr. Productions
- Distributed by: Associated Producers
- Release date: December 5, 1920
- Running time: 70 minutes
- Country: United States
- Languages: Silent; English intertitles

A Thousand to One is a lost 1920 American silent drama film directed by Rowland V. Lee and starring Hobart Bosworth, Ethel Grey Terry and Charles West.

== Plot ==
The story follows William Newlands, a man deep in debt who marries wealthy Beatrice on the advice of his unscrupulous friend, Jimmy Munroe. On their honeymoon train, they experience a derailment where Beatrice saves the life of mine owner Steven Crawford, but loses sight of her husband who is presumed dead.

In reality, Newlands has survived the wreck and is filled with remorse for his past actions. He disguises himself with a beard and finds work at Crawford's mine, eventually becoming the foreman. During his time there, he brings law and order to the miners and discovers a rich vein of ore, saving Crawford from financial ruin.

Despite his success, Newlands avoids Beatrice as he has decided to stay out of her life. However, Beatrice recognizes him and begs for a second chance at their marriage. Newlands ultimately agrees and the story ends with the couple reconciling.

== Cast ==
- Hobart Bosworth as William Newlands
- Ethel Grey Terry as Beatrice Crittenden
- Charles West as Jimmy Munroe
- Landers Stevens as Steven Crawford
- J. Gordon Russell as Georgeson
- Fred Kohler as Donnelly

== Preservation ==
With no holdings located in archives, A Thousand to One is considered a lost film.

== Bibliography ==
- Taves, Brian. Thomas Ince: Hollywood's Independent Pioneer. University Press of Kentucky, 2012.
