= Water, Water, Everywhere =

1920 film directed by Clarence G. Badger

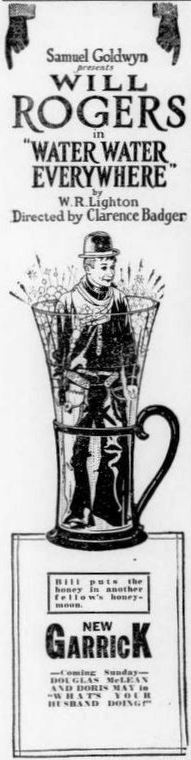
- Newspaper advertisement
- Directed by: Clarence G. Badger
- Screenplay by: Robert F. Hill
- Based on: Billy Fortune and the Hard Proposition by William Rheem Lighton
- Produced by: Samuel Goldwyn
- Starring: Will Rogers; Irene Rich; Rowland V. Lee; Wade Boteler
- Cinematography: Marcel Le Picard
- Production company: Goldwyn Pictures
- Distributed by: Goldwyn Pictures
- Release date: February 8, 1920
- Running time: 50 minutes
- Country: United States
- Language: Silent (English intertitles)

Water, Water, Everywhere is a 1920 American silent comedy film directed by Clarence G. Badger and written by Robert F. Hill. It is based on the 1912 novel Billy Fortune and the Hard Proposition by William Rheem Lighton. The film stars Will Rogers, Irene Rich, Rowland V. Lee, Wade Boteler, Margaret Livingston, and Milton Brown. The film was released on February 8, 1920, by Goldwyn Pictures.

Water, Water, Everywhere is a lost film.

== Cast ==
- Will Rogers as Billy Fortune
- Irene Rich as Hope Beecher
- Rowland V. Lee as Arthur Gunther
- Wade Boteler as Ben Morgan
- Margaret Livingston as Martha Beecher
- Milton Brown as Sam Beecher
- Victor Potel as Steve Brainard
- William Courtright as Daddy Sammett
- Sidney De Gray as Red McGee
- Lillian Langdon as Fay Bittinger
- Lydia Yeamans Titus as Mrs. Red McGee

== Production ==
=== Shooting locations ===
Director Clarence Badger recalled that the film had been shot near the Alabama Hills outside of Lone Pine, Inyo County, California. The film was released on February 8, 1920, suggesting that filming took place in late 1919 or very early 1920. If this information is correct, Water, Water Everywhere was one of the earliest productions to take place at the Alabama Hills, which would later become a standard shooting location for many western films.
