= A Man from Wyoming =

1930 film

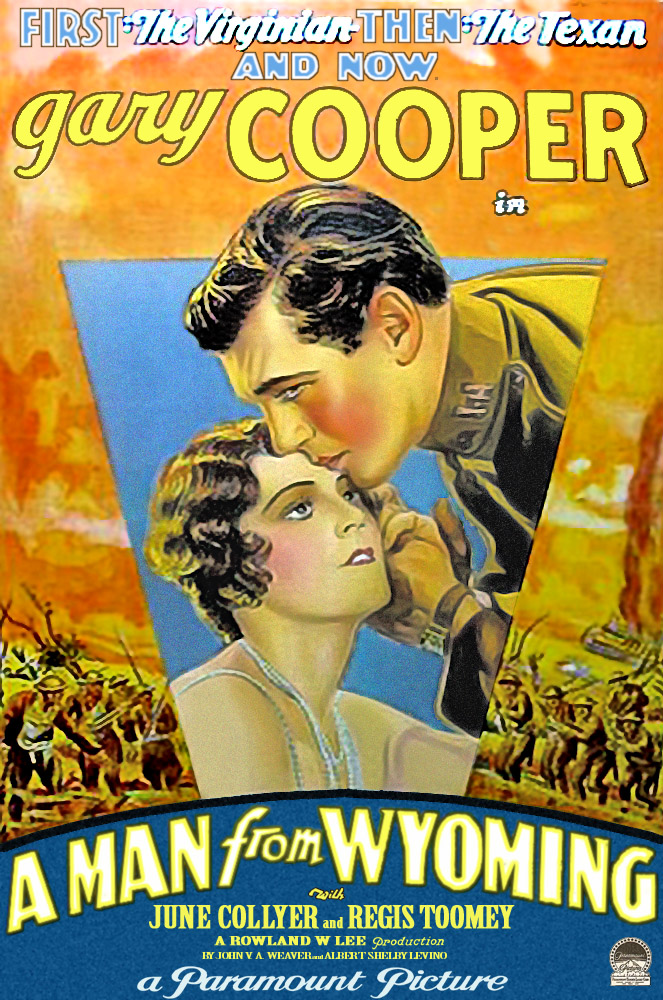
- Theatrical release poster
- Directed by: Rowland V. Lee
- Written by: Albert S. Le Vino; John V.A. Weaver
- Story by: Lew Lipton; Joseph Moncure March
- Starring: Gary Cooper; June Collyer; Regis Toomey
- Cinematography: Harry Fischbeck
- Edited by: Robert Bassler
- Music by: Karl Hajos
- Production company: Paramount Pictures
- Distributed by: Paramount Pictures
- Release date: July 12, 1930 (USA)
- Running time: 70 minutes
- Country: United States
- Language: English

A Man from Wyoming is a 1930 American Pre-Code war romance film directed by Rowland V. Lee and starring Gary Cooper, June Collyer, and Regis Toomey. Written by Albert S. Le Vino and John V.A. Weaver, the film is about a man from Wyoming who enlists in the Army and is sent to the front during World War I. There he saves the life of an American society girl working in the Ambulance Corps. Afterwards at a rest camp, they meet again, fall in love, and are secretly married.

== Plot ==
After the United States enters World War I in 1917, Wyoming native Jim Baker and his fellow engineer Jersey are sent to France with the United States Army Corps of Engineers. On the battlefield, Baker rescues Patricia Hunter, an American society girl who wanders onto the battlefield. Having worked for the Ambulance Corps, Hunter went AWOL to escape the boredom of her job. After rescuing her from enemy fire, Baker reprimands her for her actions. Later at a rest camp, Baker and Hunter see much of each other, fall in love, and are secretly married. Sometime later, Jim is sent back to the front. When Hunter reads about Baker's death, she opens a family chateau to entertain servicemen and try to forget the man she loves. When Jim arrives at the chateau, having only been wounded, he sees her apparent gaiety and misunderstands her feelings. When he encourages her to return with him to Wyoming, she refuses, and he decides to return to the front. On Armistice Day, Baker finds her waiting for him in the town where they were married.

== Cast ==
- Gary Cooper as Jim Baker
- June Collyer as Patricia Hunter
- Regis Toomey as Jersey
- Morgan Farley as Lt. Lee
- E.H. Calvert as Maj. Gen. Hunter
- Mary Foy as Inspector
- Emile Chautard as French mayor
- Edgar Dearing as Sergeant
- William B. Davidson as Major
- Ben Hall as Orderly
- J. Parker McConnell as captain in dugout

== Production ==
A Man from Wyoming was filmed on location at Paramount Ranch in Agoura, California.
