= The Silver Treasure =

1926 film by Rowland V. Lee

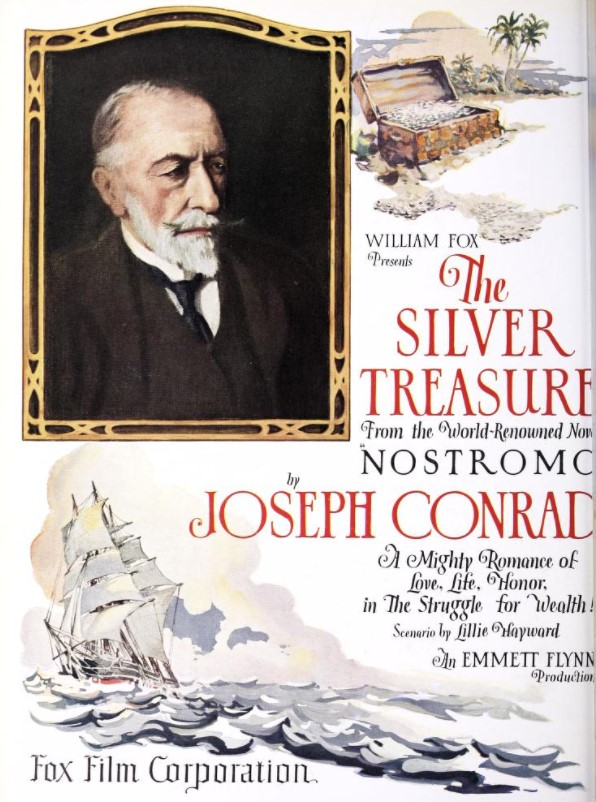
- Advertisement
- Directed by: Rowland V. Lee; Mike Miggins
- Written by: Robert N. Lee (scenario); Elizabeth Pickett Chevalier (titles)
- Based on: Nostromo by Joseph Conrad
- Produced by: William Fox
- Cinematography: G. O. Post
- Distributed by: Fox Film Corporation
- Release dates: June 19, 1926 (St. Petersburg, Florida); July 25, 1926 (New York City)
- Running time: 6 reels
- Country: United States
- Language: Silent (English intertitles)

The Silver Treasure is a 1926 American silent action drama film directed by Rowland V. Lee and starring George O'Brien. It is based on the 1904 novel Nostromo by Joseph Conrad. It was produced and distributed by the Fox Film Corporation.

== Plot ==
As described in a film magazine review, Nostromo, a young superintendent of stevedores who is loved by his men and adored by the young women of the town in a South American country, is suddenly enmeshed in love and in a plot to steal a shipment of silver from his friend Charles Gould, a mine owner. He plans to outwit the bandits, and partly succeeds. However, he finds that he is himself tempted to become a thief for the woman he loves, and attempts to steal the silver. Gould gives him a check for a large amount when he returns the silver, and Nostromo confesses his prior temptation to take it. This is forgiven and, following his second defeat of the bandits, he returns to the town to claim his sweetheart Giselle.

== Cast ==
- George O'Brien as Nostromo
- Jack Rollins as Ramirez
- Helena D'Algy as Linda Viola
- Joan Renee as Giselle Viola
- Evelyn Selbie as Mother Teresa
- Lou Tellegen as Solito, the Bandit
- Otto Matieson as Martin Decoud
- Stewart Rome as Charles Gould
- Hedda Hopper as Mrs. Gould
- Daniel Makarenko as Giorgio Viola
- Fred Becker as Hernandez
- Harvey Clark as Tito
- Gilbert Clayton as Dr. Monygham
- Sidney De Gray as Captain Mitchell
- George Kuwa as Luis

== Preservation ==
With no prints of The Silver Treasure located in any film archives, it is a lost film.
