= Will Walling =

American actor (1872–1932)

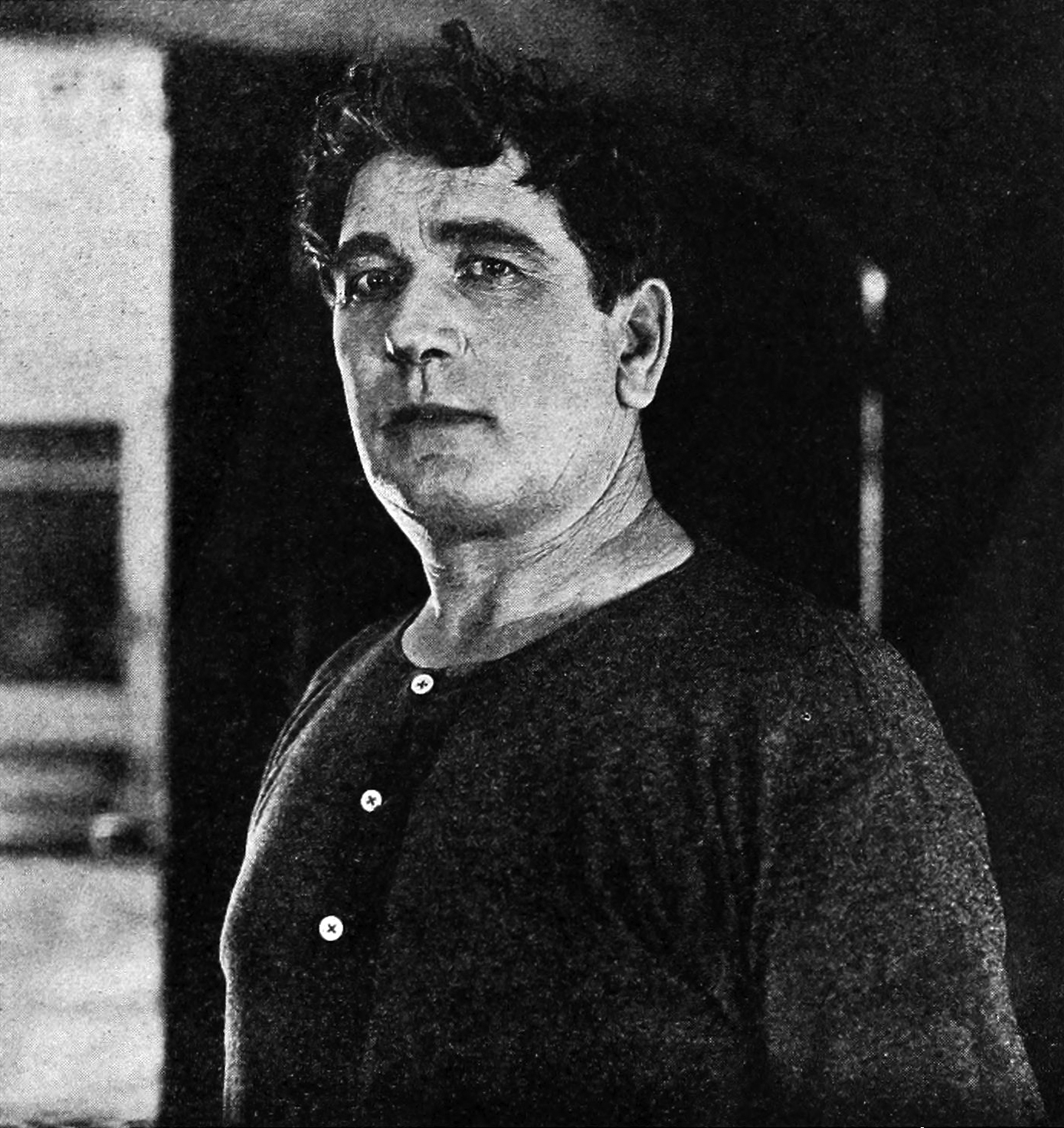
- Still from The Village Blacksmith (1922)
- Born: June 2, 1872; Iowa
- Died: March 5, 1932 (aged 59); California
- Occupation: Actor
- Years active: 1921–1932
- Spouse: Effie Bond
- Children: Richard Walling

William R. Walling (June 2, 1872 – March 5, 1932) was an American actor of stage and film in the silent era.

== Biography ==
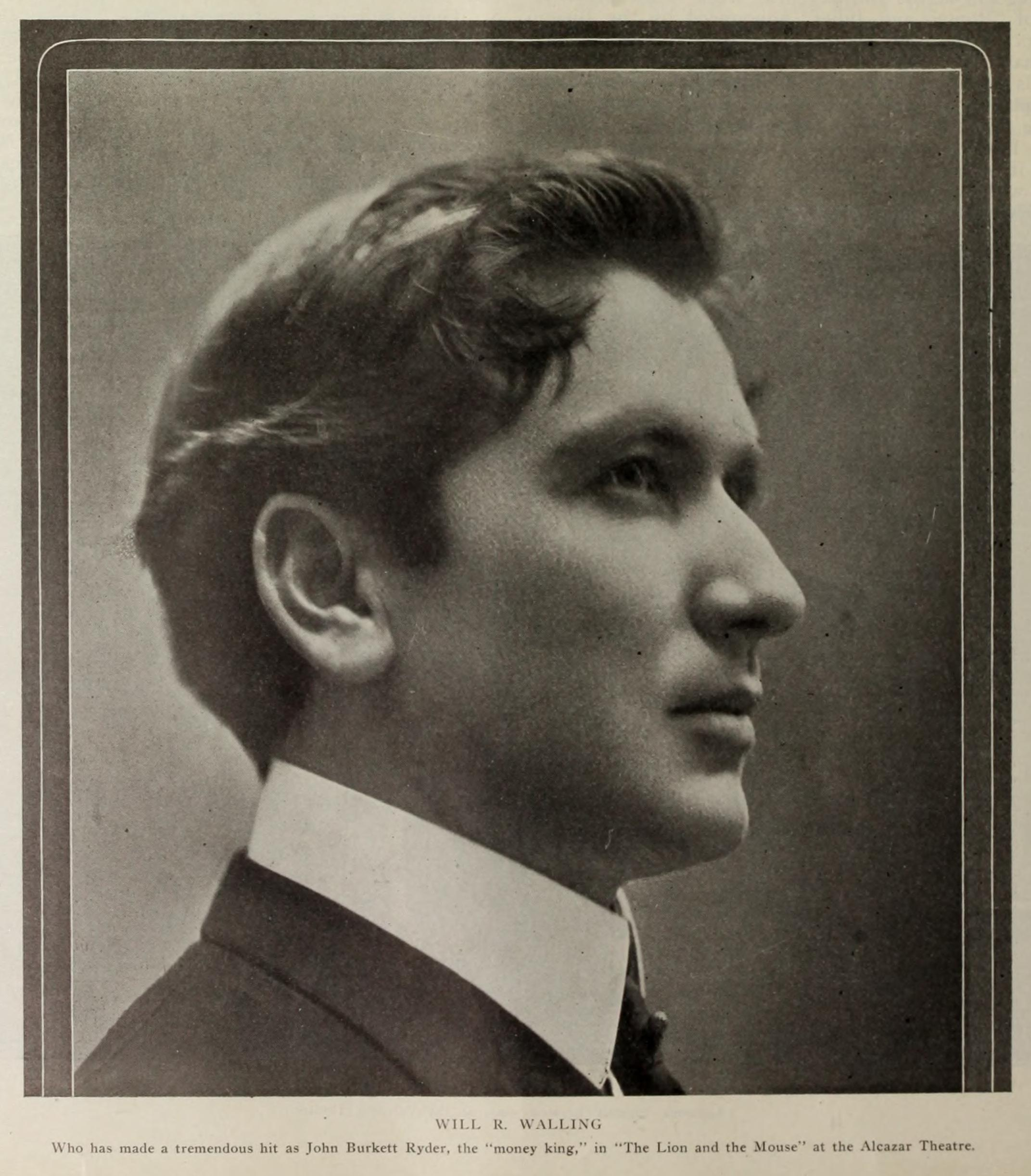
Walling in Town Talk, August 28, 1909

Before he acted in films, Walling traveled the United States performing with stock theater companies. In 1912, he was a member of the stock company at the Alcazar Theatre in San Francisco, California.

He appeared in 60 films between 1921 and 1932. He is known for his role as the railroad president in the 1926 film The Great K & A Train Robbery, which starred Tom Mix.

He died on March 5, 1932, in California, aged 59. He was married to actress Effie (née Bond) Walling and was the father of actor and photographer Richard Walling (also known as William Walling Jr.).

== Partial filmography ==
- The Killer (1921)
- The Little Minister (1921)
- North of the Rio Grande (1922)
- The Village Blacksmith (1922)
- While Satan Sleeps (1922)
- His Back Against the Wall (1922)
- The Ladder Jinx (1922)
- Nobody's Money (1923)
- North of Hudson Bay (1923)
- Nellie, the Beautiful Cloak Model (1924)
- The Iron Horse (1924)
- In Love with Love (1924)
- The Clash of the Wolves (1925)
- Ranger of the Big Pines (1925)
- The Timber Wolf (1925)
- His Master's Voice (1925)
- The Gentle Cyclone (1926)
- Sir Lumberjack (1926)
- Lost at Sea (1926)
- Womanpower (1926)
- The Great K & A Train Robbery (1926)
- The Canyon of Light (1926)
- The Devil's Partner (1926)
- Sin Cargo (1926)
- The Princess from Hoboken (1927)
- The Devil's Saddle (1927)
- The Harvester (1927)
- The King of Kings (1927)
- Now I'll Tell One (1927)
- The Noose (1928)
- Dark Streets (1929)
- Beyond the Law (1930)
- Range Feud (1931)
- Two Fisted Justice (1931)
- Riders of the North (1931)
- The Painted Desert (1931) as Kirby
- Ridin' for Justice (1932)
- High Speed (1932)
