= Robert N. Lee =

American screenwriter

- Born: May 12, 1890; Butte, Montana, U.S.
- Died: September 18, 1964 (aged 74); Hollywood, California, U.S.
- Occupation: Screenwriter
- Years active: 1922–45
- Relatives: Rowland V. Lee (brother)

Robert N. Lee (12 May 1890 – 18 September 1964) was an American screenwriter. He wrote for 31 films between 1922 and 1945. He was nominated for an Academy Award for Adapted Screenplay at the 4th Academy Awards for Little Caesar. He was born in Butte, Montana, and died in Hollywood, California, from a heart attack.

== Partial filmography ==
- Shirley of the Circus (1922)
- Cameo Kirby (1923)
- You Can't Get Away with It (1923)
- Western Luck (1924)
- The Hunted Woman (1925)
- The Silver Treasure (1926)
- Underworld (1927)
- The Dude Wrangler (1930)
- Little Caesar (1931)
- The Dragon Murder Case (1934)
- While the Patient Slept (1935)
