= The Exquisite Sinner =

1926 film

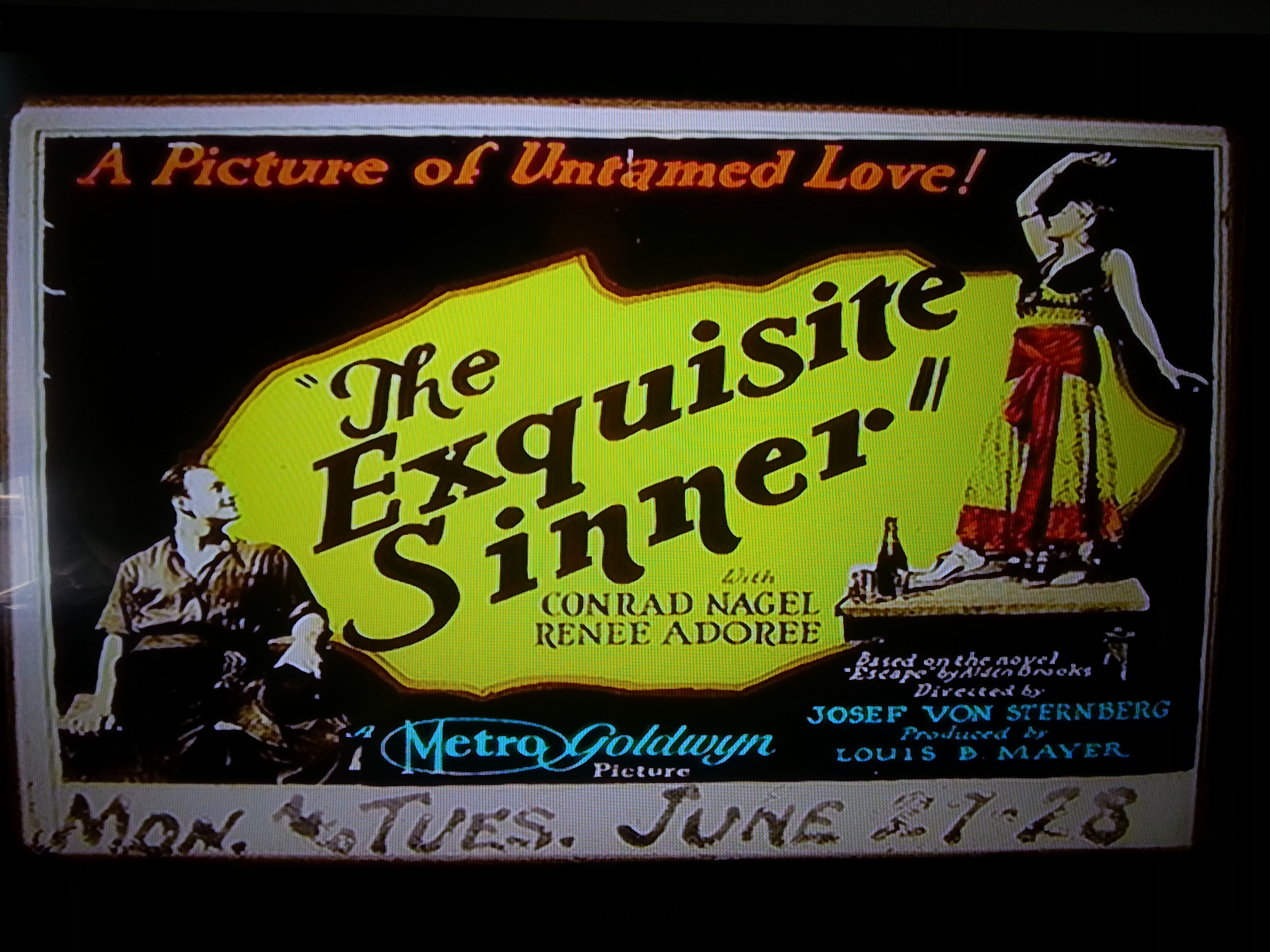
- Coming attraction slide
- Directed by: Josef von Sternberg; Phil Rosen
- Written by: Alice D. G. Miller; Josef von Sternberg
- Based on: Exquisite Sinner by Alden Brooks
- Starring: Conrad Nagel; Renée Adorée; Paulette Duval; Frank Currier
- Cinematography: Max Fabian
- Distributed by: Metro-Goldwyn-Mayer
- Release date: March 28, 1926
- Running time: 60 minutes
- Country: United States
- Language: Silent (English intertitles)

The Exquisite Sinner is a 1926 American silent drama film directed by Josef von Sternberg and adapted by Alice Duer Miller from the novel Escape by Alden Brooks. Starring Conrad Nagel and Renée Adorée, the Metro-Goldwyn-Mayer (MGM) never given a general release. No known print of the film has been recovered to date. Later that same year a second feature film Heaven on Earth, directed by Phil Rosen was released with the same cast and same sets, but a different screenplay. Rosen's version performed poorly at the box office. Sternberg reported, "the result was two ineffective films instead of one.” The American Film Institute Catalog Feature Films: 1921-30 by The American Film Institute.

== Plot ==
The film concerns a young bourgeois Frenchman, Dominique Prad, who spurns his family's lucrative silk business for the bohemian life of an artist. Fleeing his estate to join a band of gypsies, the mentally unstable painter falls in love with a pretty gypsy maiden, Silda.

== Cast ==
- Conrad Nagel as Dominique Prad
- Renée Adorée as Silda, a gypsy maid
- Paulette Duval as Yvonne
- Frank Currier as Colonel
- George K. Arthur as Colonel's orderly
- Matthew Betz as Secchi, the Gypsy chief
- Helena D'Algy as Dominique's sister
- Claire Du Brey as Dominique's sister
- Myrna Loy as Living statue

== Background ==
On the basis of Sternberg's impressive directorial debut, The Salvation Hunters, actor-producer Mary Pickford invited him to direct her next feature and Metro-Goldwyn-Mayer brought him under contract. When Sternberg presented her with a screenplay entitled Backwash that incorporated experimental camera techniques and in which she would play a blind girl, Pickford declined it. M-G-M assigned Sternberg, now under an eight-movie contract, to direct a more conventional project, The Exquisite Sinner.

== Pre-production ==
The Exquisite Sinner, Sternberg's first commercial feature, would be meticulously vetted by MGM: “In 1924, the year in which it was formed, Metro-Goldwyn-Mayer …possessed a sophisticated system for accessing stories” monitoring every stage of production from story to the screen.

Escape - the working title during production – was based on a novel by the same name by Alden Brooks, a romance set in France just after the end of the First World War. MGM reviewers regarded the novel as “highly dramatic, but slight” that could be made into “a beautiful and compelling picture.” Sternberg presented the studio with “a continuity sketch” (i.e. “treatment”) based on the work...and scriptwriter Alice Duer Miller submitted “a screenplay of 120 scenes based on the novel.” MGM's estimate of Sternberg's sketch was positive, with a caveat: “refreshing…it seems to be directed toward [a] pictorial treatment rather than a logical and consistent development of the story.” Sternberg flew to Quebec, Canada to gather a sense of French Canadian “atmosphere”.

== Production ==
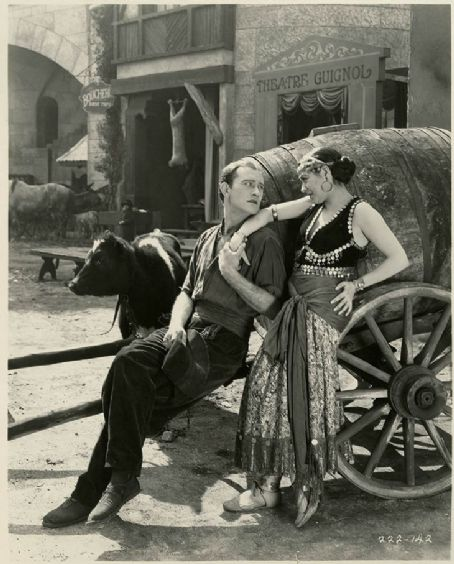
The Exquisite Sinner. L to R, Conrad Nagel, Renée Adorée

The Exquisite Sinner was filmed in Hollywood during February 1925. Robert Florey, the films assistant director, provides a sketch of Sternberg's on-set persona in the journal Hollywood d'hier et d'aujourd'hui.

"At 8:45 Sternberg arrived on the set. All actors were lined up. He passed before them in review, inspecting them from head to foot, their sergeant-major waiting at a respectful distance. When he arrived at the twenty-first gendarme, Sternberg stopped, hypnotizing the poor man. Then he turned to the technicians and shouted angrily, ‘What do you take me for? For Niblo or Vidor? Who do you think I am?’ Enraged, he began rapping on the camera with his cane, to the alarm of Max Fabian, the operator. ‘Get me the head of production. I will not permit you to mock me’ etc. Bush and Cohn arrived at a gallop, and Sternberg exposed the reason for his protest. ‘A button is missing from the tunic of this gendarme. I will not endure an insult of this sort!...”

Metro-Goldwyn-Mayer had recently endured the “Teutonic tantrums” exhibited by director Erich von Stroheim during the filming of The Merry Widow and were not amused by Sternberg's histrionics. As the production proceeded, studio executives began to doubt Sternberg's commitments to satisfying their expectations of a commercial success. Despite Sternberg's eccentricities, Florey regarded the completed film as cinematically advanced in photographic technique, describing the movie as “full of interest” and exhibiting “the humor of which Sternberg was a master.”

When MGM reviewed the “finished version”, the film was deemed “photographically and pictorially [impressive]...But it is in vain we look for the theme of the story.” An MGM staff reader considered it “well worthwhile to reconstruct the story and the picture” through re-editing, as well as “injecting some vital sequences.” After a rigorous re-working and a new title - The Exquisite Sinner - the film was previewed to a test audience in March 1925 and “[poor] audience reaction…was a serious blow to the production.” The preview seems to have been “crucial” in determining MGM's decision not to release the film. Despite the considerable investment “The Exquisite Sinner was put on hold.” Studio executives hoped “to make it into something [appealing] to a mass audience.” Their ambivalence towards the picture would result in “two versions of the film [screenplays] that MGM was eventually to make and release by 1927.” By the time The Exquisite Sinner had been pulled “Sternberg had already moved to The Masked Bride, the project that would prompt him to walk out on MGM in the summer of 1925” after just two weeks. His replacement, Christy Cabanne, would garner sole directorial credit for the Mae Murray feature.

In an effort to salvage The Exquisite Sinner, “MGM set its veteran director Phil Rosen to work on a second version of the film…using the same stars.” This demonstrates that the studio was in a position financially and organizationally to delay release of a major production and “in the meantime entirely rescript and reshoot the film under another director in an attempt to produce a certain profit-earner.” The movie was re-scripted as “a bittersweet wartime romance, the studio hoping to emulate the success of King Vidor’s The Big Parade (1925), which also starred Renée Adorée in a romance with a young Frenchman. As a result “MGM had two films on its shelf that shared a [story] source, a title and their stars. It is not clear if the Rosen film also made use of any footage that Sternberg shot in 1925.” Rosen's version was re-titled “Heaven on Earth...a farce comedy...told on screen in a brisk and logical manner which unifies the plot and holds the attention of the audience” according to an MGM reviewer. The second film was released in 1927, after a number retakes.

Film historian John Baxter describes the Hollywood studio system that was emerging when Sternberg was beginning to make commercial features:

"By the 1920s, as the studios that had sprung up in southern California coalesced into an increasingly rigid system for turning out a predictable quantity of commodities for a market approaching saturation, they were developing a repertoire of discursive models with more or less proven ability to generate saleable products. Systemization itself militate against taking financial risks on atypical ventures...”

== Critical response ==
As The Exquisite Sinner was never released to the general public, the “reception” to the film is limited to studio employees involved in the production and to film historians. Writing in the early 1930s documentary filmmaker and critic John Grierson defended the film and its director: "He made a fine picture for Metro called The Exquisite Sinner and had been heaved off the payroll for adding some genuine local color to the Breton scene."

The National Board of Review, despite the film's poor performance and Sternberg's own misgivings, selected The Exquisite Sinner as among the top forty best pictures of 1926.

== Preservation status ==
SilentEra says a copy of the film is in the Turner Entertainment Co. archives. It is rumored that the Warner Bros. and Turner Entertainment archives holds a full print of this film, but as of 2014, no print has surfaced. Only a few images, promotional artwork and productions stills are currently known to exist.

== Sources ==
- Sarris, Andrew. 1966. The Films of Josef von Sternberg. Museum of Modern Art/Doubleday. New York, New York.
- Baxter, John. 1971. The Cinema of Josef von Sternberg. The International Film Guide Series. A.S Barners & Company, New York.
- Baxter, John, 1993. Just Watch! Paramount, Sternberg and America. British Film Institute, BFI Publishing. ISBN 0-85170-387-9
