= The Salvation Hunters =

1925 film

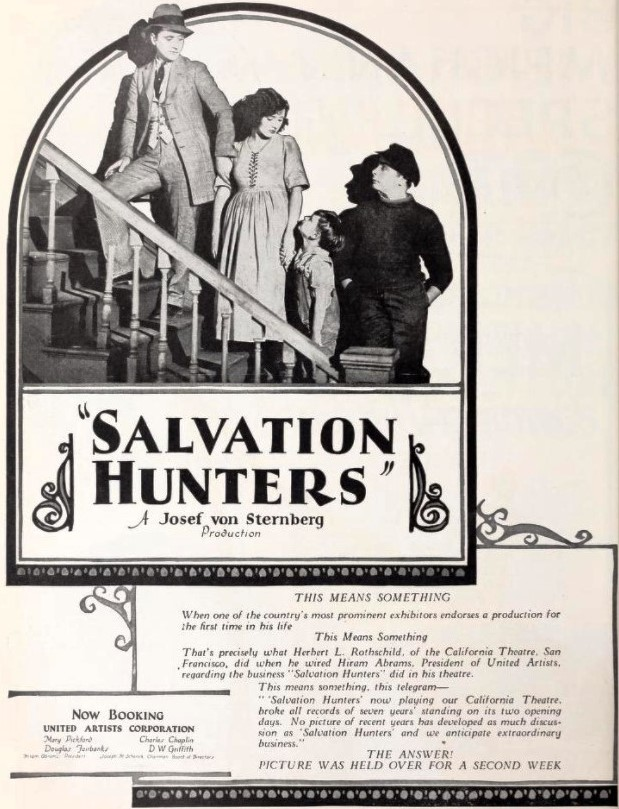
- Advertisement in Moving Picture World
- Directed by: Josef von Sternberg
- Written by: Josef von Sternberg
- Produced by: Josef von Sternberg
- Starring: Georgia Hale; George K. Arthur
- Cinematography: Edward Gheller
- Distributed by: United Artists
- Release date: February 15, 1925
- Running time: 65 minutes
- Country: United States
- Language: Silent (English intertitles)

The Salvation Hunters is a 1925 American silent drama film which marked the directorial debut of the 30-year old Josef von Sternberg. The feature stars Georgia Hale and George K. Arthur, and would bring Sternberg, "a new talent", to the attention of the major movie studios, including Metro-Goldwyn-Mayer and Paramount Pictures. Film Mercury included The Salvation Hunters in its ten-best list for the films of 1925.

== Plot ==
The Salvation Hunters

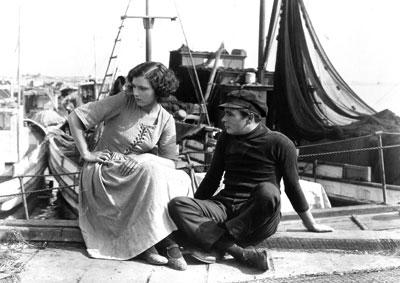
L-R "The Girl" (Georgia Hale) and "The Boy" (George K. Arthur): "... down-and-out drifters"

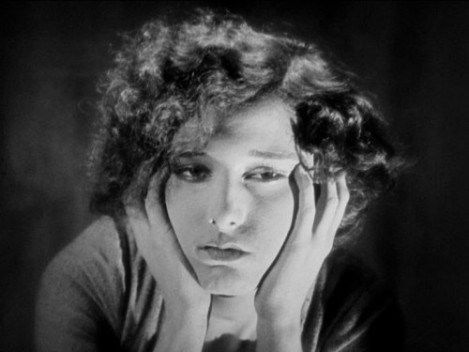
Director von Sternberg: Hale's "sullen charm" - Georgia Hale as "The Girl"

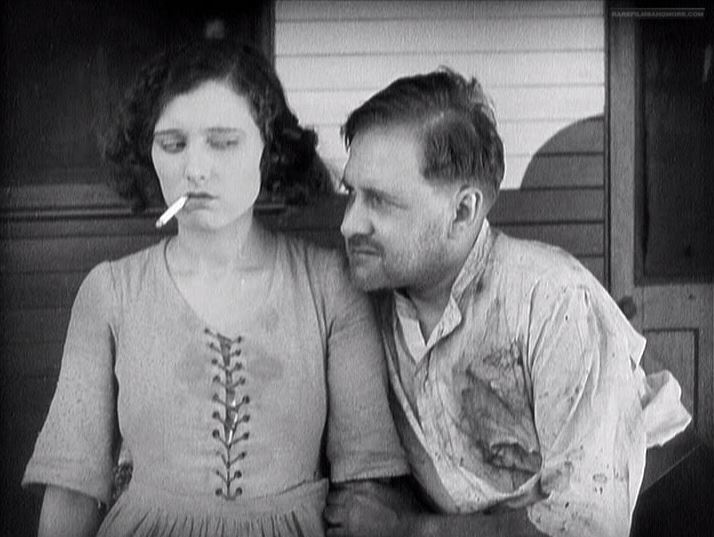
The Girl (Georgia Hale) and The Brute (Olaf Hytten)

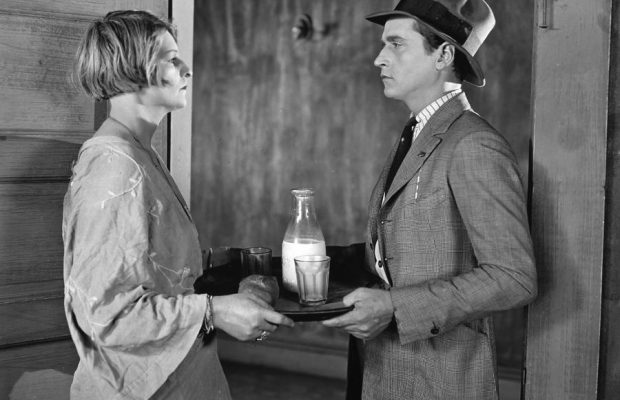
The Woman (Nellie Bly Baker) and The Man (Otto Matiesen)

The film opens with a foreword:

There are important fragments of life that have been avoided by the motion picture because Thought is concerned and not the Body. A thought can create and destroy nations—and it is all the more powerful because it is born of suffering, lives in silence, and dies when it has done its work. Our aim has been to photograph a thought—A thought that guides humans who crawl close to the earth—whose lives are simple—who begin nowhere and end nowhere.

The story begins along a bleak waterfront in an unidentified harbor. Industrial refuse litters the shore. A giant Sisyphean dredge scoops mud from a channel and into a massive barge. Four characters, "humans who crawl close to the earth" occupy the brooding landscape:

The Boy, a fainthearted and feckless youth, wanders aimlessly amid the wreckage. He fancies The Girl.
The Girl, older and hardened by her impoverishment, has "sunk as low as her socks." Maintaining a sullen dignity in her solitude, she spurns The Boys diffident advances.
The Child is an orphaned youngster. He silently haunts the mud barge where his parents lost their lives.
The Brute is a man of indeterminate age and short-tempered. He acts as watchman aboard the barge.

The Brute makes a pass at The Girl. She cuts him cold with a glare and he retreats. Frustrated, The Brute assaults The Child who has trespassed on the barge. The Boy witnesses the assault, but is frozen by his cowardice. The Girl, with a single word, shames him into action. He gingerly collects The Child, and they flee together with The Brute in pursuit. The Girl, with a look, signals the dredge operator, who unleashes a torrent of mud on the head of The Brute.

The Boy, The Girl and The Child escape from the desolate docks to the slums of an unnamed metropolis.

As the threesome trudge through the back alleys of the city, they are spotted by The Man and his client, The Gentleman. The Man accosts The Boy and confirms what he suspects: they are homeless and penniless. He assures The Boy that jobs are plentiful, and offers to provide a room for the trio while The Boy seeks employment. Unbeknownst to them, the "room" is located in a brothel. The Man's aim is to enlist The Girl as a prostitute. When they are ushered into the seedy flat, The Woman, a sex worker, attempts to provide them with some refreshment. The Man stops her: "Hunger will whisper things in their ears that I might find troublesome to say."

As the hours pass, The Girl becomes increasingly anxious due to The Child's pleas for food. The Boy returns from his futile search for work demoralized. They are on the verge of despair. The Boy indulges in a vivid fantasy, in which he, The Girl and The Child are transformed into wealthy aristocrats, who arrive at their estate escorted by servants dressed in faux-military livery.

The Gentlemen, with the encouragement of the Man, enters the room expecting to negotiate sex with a prostitute. The Girl coldly considers the proposition. The Boy becomes distraught when he discerns The Girl's ambivalence. The Gentleman, grasping her dilemma, bestows a gift of money on the Girl without comment and quietly takes his leave. The Child snatches the largesse and bolts to the door, returning shortly with provisions for a meal – the crisis past.

The Man, thwarted in his endeavor, devises another plan in collusion with The Woman. They invite the young trio to an outing in the countryside. There, he intends to seduce The Girl and coerce her into the sex trade: "…let romance do a little work.". The Woman is tasked with distracting The Boy during the seduction.

The party of five arrives in the country in a touring car. They park next to a real estate sign that reads "Here Your Dreams Come True." Despite The Man's best efforts, The Girl remains unresponsive to his blandishments. Exasperated, he lashes out at The Child. The Boy, shedding his fear, leaps to the defense of the little boy and beats The Man into submission with his fists. The Girl rejoices that The Boy has claimed his manhood.

Triumphantly, the trio – now a family –strides into the sunset, "children of the sun."

== Cast ==
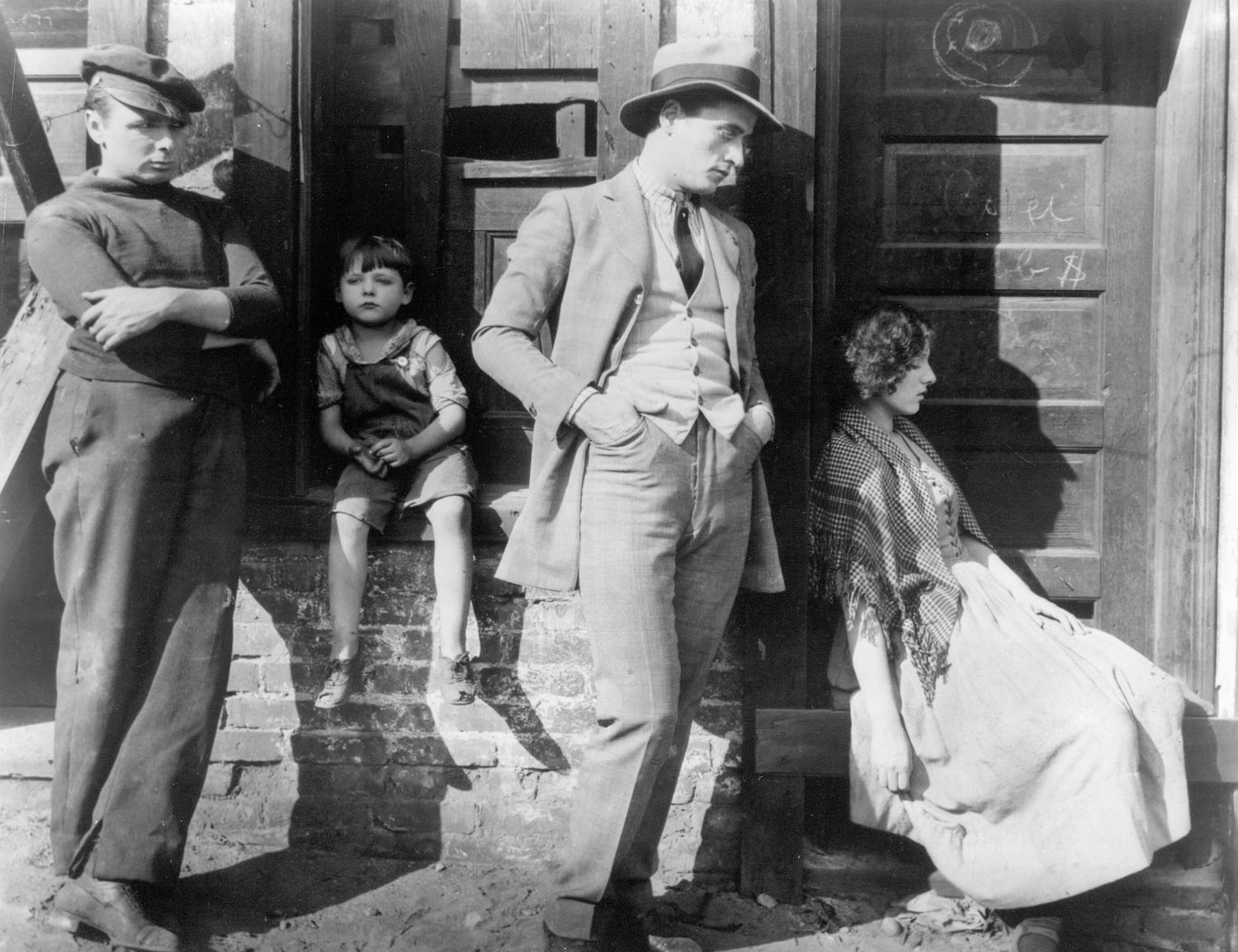
L-R, The Boy (George K. Arthur), The Child (Bruce Guerin), The Man (Otto Matiesen), The Girl (Georgia Hale)

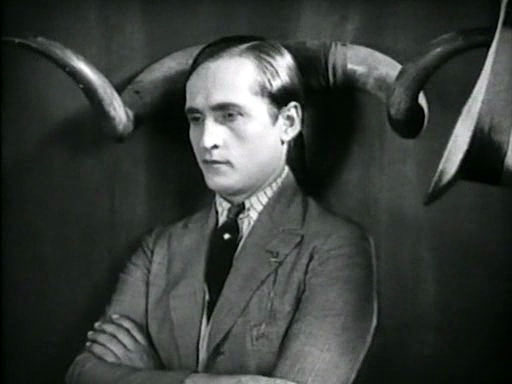
The Salvation Hunters (1925). Otto Matieson as "The Man".

- George K. Arthur as The Boy
- Georgia Hale as The Girl
- Bruce Guerin as The Child
- Otto Matieson as The Man
- Nellie Bly Baker as The Woman
- Olaf Hytten as The Brute
- Stuart Holmes as The Gentleman

== Background ==
English actor and producer George K. Arthur approached Sternberg to film a comedy entitled “Just Plain Buggs". Sternberg had recently served as assistant-director and writer on Roy William Neill’s film By Divine Right (1924) and accepted the offer, with the caveat that they substitute his own screenplay, The Salvation Hunters, to which Arthur agreed.

Though the details remain “confused and controversial” the film was financed by Sternberg and Arthur for just under five thousand dollars. Sternberg contributed the bulk of his personal savings to meet budgetary shortfalls. In this respect, The Salvation Hunters may be considered an independent film and as such “an almost unique specimen in its time.”

== Production ==
Filming began in the fall of 1924. The movie was shot on location in California, including San Pedro, Chinatown, San Fernando Valley and at Grand-Asher Studios.

Due to budgetary restraints, Sternberg and Arthur employed Hollywood extras, so-called "supers", rather than featured players. Georgia Hale was a cabaret singer and dress extra on Vanity's Price (1924) when Sternberg tapped her for the role of The Girl. She and most of the cast agreed to "defer" salaries. Stuart Holmes, who played The Gentleman, was an exception; a well-known screen "villain" - and famous sculptor - he was paid $100 in advance for his brief, but effective, appearance in The Salvation Hunters.

== Reception ==
The Salvation Hunters was a “complete failure” at its New York City premiere, where it ran less than a week. Nationwide, attendance was “unspectacular.” As Sternberg, at the Hollywood premiere remarked, “The members of the cast were in the audience, which greeted my work with laughter and jeers and finally rioted. Many walked out, and so did I.”

In the aftermath of the film's brief showing, Arthur took steps to see that a print was smuggled into the home of actor-director-producer Charlie Chaplin, where it received a private viewing by the film star and associates Douglas Fairbanks, Sr., Mary Pickford and Joseph Schenck. Subsequently, The New York Times Sunday entertainment section of February 1, 1925 carried the following announcement:

”The Salvation Hunters directed by Josef von Sternberg, a young Austrian, is to be presented at the Mark Strand this week. This is the film which caught the fancy of Charles Chaplin, Douglas Fairbanks and Mary Pickford. Mr. Chaplin was particularly enthusiastic about the picture.”

At years’ end Film Mercury movie critic Anabel Lane included The Salvation Hunters in the top-10 list for 1925:

1. D. W. Griffith’s Isn't Life Wonderful
2. King Vidor’ The Big Parade
3. Erich von Stroheim’s Greed
4. Sven Gade’s Siège
5. Augusto Genina’s Cyrano de Bergerac
6. Clarence Badger’s Paths to Paradise
7. F. W. Murnau’s The Last Laugh
8. Josef von Sternberg’s The Salvation Hunters
9. Malcolm St. Clair’s Are Parents People?
10.Herbert Brenon’s Peter Pan

With his star rising among the studio executives, Sternberg signed a long-term contract with Metro-Goldwyn-Mayer. Despite this promising entry into commercial movie-making his "association [with Metro] was doomed from the start" as evidenced in his first feature The Exquisite Sinner.

== Theme ==
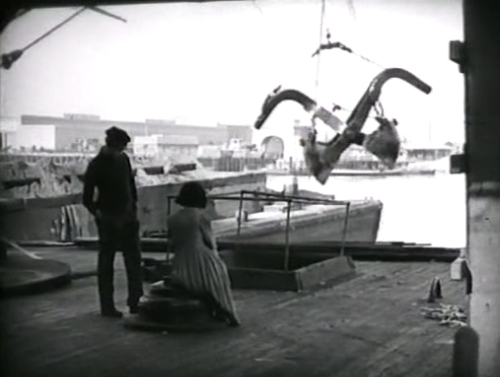
The Girl (Georgia Hale) and The Boy (George K Arthur): The Mud Dredge, "mechanical motion as the representation of cosmic futility"

“The underlying theme of Sternberg’s cinema,” observes critic Andrew Sarris, is the relationships of men and women “or more precisely, man’s confrontation of the myths of womanhood.” His oeuvre demonstrates this “from The Salvation Hunters to Anatahan”, his last film.

The Gentleman (played by Stewart Holmes) is “curious”: the “first screen character who respects the women he seeks to reduce to prostitution.” The Gentleman is portrayed neither as a depraved denizen of bordellos nor a salacious deviate. “Though eager to sleep with The Girl, he never loses his dignity or bearing [and] respects her reluctance when he discovers she is driven by hunger”, as well as concern for her younger companions. Sternberg's Gentleman is a “far more advanced” depiction of the “predatory Men of the World” than achieved by directors Chaplin or Lubitsch in the 1920s. The character “prefigures G.W. Pabst’s treatment of Louise Brooks and her respectful lovers in Diary of a Lost Girl and Pandora's Box” in the late twenties.

The Girl, who with merely a look succeeds in deflecting The Brute and commands the operation of heavy equipment (the mud-dredge), exhibits “a mystical authority...[an] authority which marks Sternberg’s attitude toward women long before the debut of Marlene Dietrich. “The real drama of The Salvation Hunters is not concerned with the rise of the downtrodden, but rather with the moving (emotion in motion) spectacle of a Girl waiting for a Boy to grow into a Man.”

== See also ==
- A Woman of the Sea (1926), film directed by Sternberg for Chaplin

== Sources ==
- Baxter, John (1971). The Cinema of Josef von Sternberg. The International Film Guide Series. New York: A.S Barners & Company. ISBN 0-4980-7991-0.
- Baxter, Peter (1993). Just Watch! Paramount, Sternberg and America. British Film Institute. BFI Publishing. ISBN 0-85170-387-9.
- Messerli, Douglas (2013). "Children of the Sun: Josef von Sternberg/The Salvation Hunters". World Cinema Review.
- Sarris, Andrew (1966). The Films of Josef von Sternberg. New York: Doubleday. ASIN B000LQTJG4.
- Silver, Charles (2010). Josef von Sternberg's The Docks of New York.
- Weinberg, Herman G. (1967). Josef von Sternberg. A Critical Study. New York: Dutton.
