= The Town (1945 film) =

1944 film by Josef von Sternberg

- Directed by: Josef von Sternberg
- Written by: Joseph Krumgold
- Produced by: Philip Dunne
- Cinematography: Larry Madison
- Production company: United States Office of War Information
- Release date: 1945
- Running time: 12 minutes
- Country: United States
- Language: English

The Town is a short propaganda film produced by the Office of War Information in 1943. The documentary, depicting the American Midwestern city of Madison, Indiana was filmed by Josef von Sternberg in 1943 and released in 1945.

== Synopsis ==
The Town is a 1943 American documentary film whose subject is the Midwestern town of Madison, Indiana. Endorsed by the United States Office of War Information (OWI), which oversaw propaganda during World War II, the 11-minute film presents Madison “as the model American town where citizens embodied American ideals and values.” Filmed by the acclaimed Hollywood director Josef von Sternberg, the camera showcases the people of Madison – many of whom were European immigrants – in their “public libraries, corner drugstores, schoolhouses and public swimming pools.”

The Town was created as part of The American Scene series and “shown overseas to remind troops what they were fighting to preserve and to demonstrate American cultural values to foreigners. It was translated into 32 languages.”

The Academy Film Archive preserved The Town in 2012. The film is part of the Academy War Film Collection, one of the largest collections of World War II era short films held outside government archives.

== Theme ==
Sternberg's portrait of Madison, Indiana in the sun-drenched summer of 1943 serves to artistically unite the Old World influences brought by European immigrants with the “progressive social and political ideas of the New World.”

Sternberg opens the documentary show-casing “an Italian campanile, a palladian portico, a Renaissance fountain” as if these were features from a European travelogue. The audience is disabused of that impression when a narrator identifies the structures as the functional and egalitarian architecture of a small Mid-western community: “the fountain belongs to the local swimming pool, a courthouse, the portico to a courthouse and the campanile is the Madison Fire Brigade bell-tower.”

The citizenry of Madison, some identifiable ethnically as Austrian, Greek, Swedish and French are all active in work and social life. Employing tracking and dissolve shots, Sternberg's camera explores the social institutions in town and country, urban and rural, as well as quiet and secure suburban streets and homes.

Commenting on Sternberg's approach to his wartime assignment, film critic John Baxter writes:

”The Town is a work of a happy man, reacting without bitterness to a project considerably beneath his own abilities.”

== See also ==
- List of Allied propaganda films of World War II

== Sources ==
- Baxter, John. 1971. The Cinema of Josef von Sternberg. The International Film Guide Series. A.S Barners & Company, New York.
- National Park Service. No date provided. Twentieth Century: Madison, Indiana. US Department of Interior. Retrieved 30 May 2018.
- Supten, Tom. 2006. This is The Town and These Are the People. Bright Lights Film Journal. September 15, 2006. Retrieved 30 May 2018. http://brightlightsfilm.com/this-is-the-town-and-these-are-the-people/#.Ww7lLlKouUk
