= Paul Nelson (architect) =

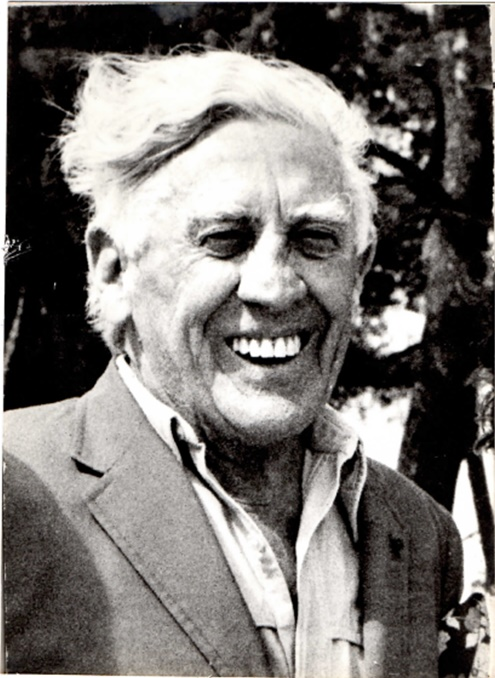
- Born: November 8, 1895; Chicago, Illinois, U. S.
- Died: 1979 (aged 83–84); Marseille
- Occupation: Architect
- Known for: Modern Architecture

Paul Nelson (8 November 1895 – 1979) was an American-turned-French Modern architect.

== Biography ==
Nelson was born in Chicago, Illinois to an American middle-class family of Irish origin. From 1913 to 1917 he studied at Princeton University and in 1917 he enrolled as a volunteer in the LaFayette Escadrille, which was a U.S. unit constituted in 1916 and operated under French command during World War I.

Nelson returned to America after the war to work at a bank and then transitioned to work at his father's interior decoration company. He moved to Paris in 1920 and continued his studies at the École Nationale Supérieure des Beaux-Arts in the private workshop of Emmanuel Pontremoli and Auguste Perret. He married a French woman, Francine Le Cœur. Francine was the daughter of François Le Cœur, an architect and teacher at the École Spéciale d'Architecture in Paris.

In 1927, Nelson entered the Register of Architects and was certified by the government. He settled in Varengeville-sur-Mer, working in the same workshop used years before by Claude Monet, Jean-Baptiste Corot, and Eugène Isabey. He was friends with figures such as Ernest Hemingway, Ezra Pound, and Francis Scott Fitzgerald. He knew many artists such as Georges Braque, Joan Miró, Pablo Picasso, Alexander Calder, André Derain, Fernand Léger, and Alberto Giacometti.

During the Second World War, Nelson returned to the United States and acted as chairman of the “France for ever” movement, which aimed to spread French culture to Americans. In 1944, he was appointed as head of the Construction and Urban Planning division at the French Supply mission in Washington. In 1945, he became the Technical Advisor to the French Ministry of Reconstruction. He later took the role as adviser to the US National Health Service for the French Ministry of Public Health. He organized an exhibition at Grand Palais regarding American architectural and construction techniques. His wife died in 1951, and a year later he married the painter Madd Giannattasio, daughter of Ugo Giannattasio, futurist painter and writer. The couple had two sons, Ugo and Rory, an architect and a musician respectively.

Nelson taught in the most prestigious American universities. In 1963, André Malraux appointed him as Director of Atelier Franco-Américain d’Architecture at l’École Nationale Supérieure des Beaux-Arts. Between 1967 and 1977, he also headed the Atelier Franco-International in Marseille.

In 1973, Nelson obtained French citizenship.

Nelson died in 1979. He was buried in the Varengeville-sur-Mer cemetery, near his wife Madd Giannattasio and the painter Georges Braque, his great friend who had joined him in Normandy in 1929 and for whom he had designed the atelier.

== Works ==
Nelson's research was focused on space conception and the use of prefabrication. He became an expert on hospital architecture, which was the subject of his thesis.

One of Nelson's first works was the Parisian residence of the American author Alden Brooks, designed in 1929. In 1930, he designed the decorations of Allan Dwan's movie What a widow! with Gloria Swanson.

In 1932, Nelson presented a project for the new hospital in Lille, published in Cahiers d’Art in 1933. The project was ambitious but was refused due to being a foreign architect.

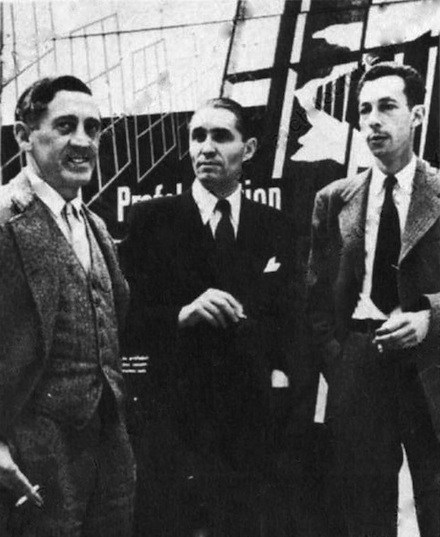
Paul Nelson, on the left, with Robert Pontraby and Anatole Koop, on the right

In 1934, Nelson designed the surgical building of the hospital of the Suez Canal company in Ismailia, north-east Egypt. He changed the form of operating rooms, which become ovoid, using glass floors and walls. Despite his work's appreciation, it was not carried out in his innovation and the hospital was built using more traditional designs created by the company architect. The project was published on Cahiers d’Art in 1935 in an article signed by Jean Hélion.

From 1936 to 1938, Nelson worked on the design of a suspended house to show the benefits of steel construction as a solution to standard housing. For the project, he involved artists such as Jean Arp, Alexandre Calder, Fernand Léger, Joan Miró.

In 1937, Nelson participated in the competition of the international exhibition "Arts et Techniques dans la Vie Moderne" for the Palais de la Découverte at Grand Palais. His constructivist architecture project was not accepted. The same year, he joined his friend Fernand Léger in a contest for the radio WGN of Chicago.

After the war, Nelson worked on his magnum opus: the Centre Hospitalier Mémorial France - États-Unis in Saint-Lô, designed and built between 1946 and 1956, with contribution from the United States.

In 1946, Nelson worked together with Alberto Giacometti to design a memorial to Gabriel Péri.

Nelson took part in an experimental construction project of three modern buildings with the help of Charles Tillon (Minister for Reconstruction and Urban Planning in 1947). It was related to Noisy-le-Sec reconstruction. He worked on it closely from 1950 to 1953 with architects Roger Gilbert and Charles Sébillotte.

In 1955, Nelson submitted a design for the Musée national Fernand Léger in Biot; it was not accepted, and the museum was built to the design of Andreï Svetchine.

Between 1967 and 1977, Nelson designed the Policlinique François I in Le Havre, as well as Dinan (1968) and Arles hospitals (1965–1974).
