= Vanity's Price =

1924 film

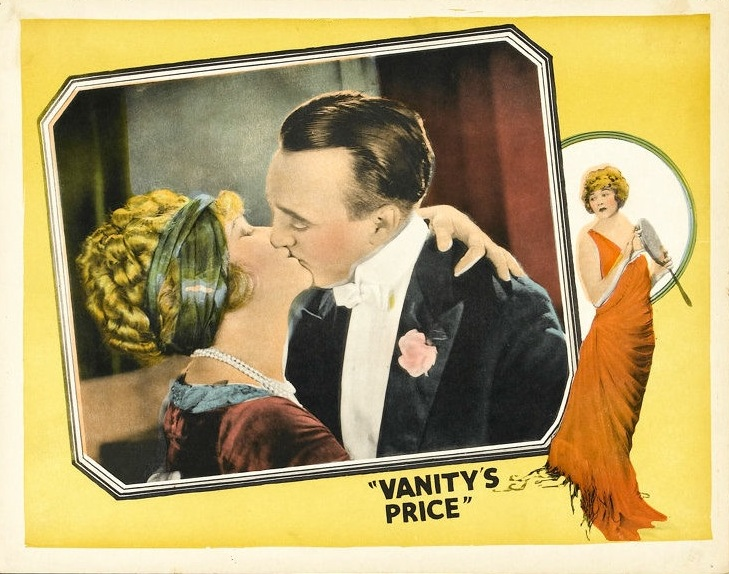
- Lobby card
- Directed by: Roy William Neill; Josef von Sternberg (ass't director)
- Written by: Paul Bern (story, scenario)
- Produced by: Gothic Productions
- Starring: Anna Q. Nilsson
- Cinematography: Hal Mohr
- Production company: Gothic Productions
- Distributed by: Film Booking Offices of America
- Release date: September 7, 1924
- Running time: 60 minutes; 6 reels
- Country: United States
- Language: Silent (English intertitles)

Vanity's Price is a 1924 American silent drama film directed by Roy William Neill and starring Anna Q. Nilsson. It was produced by the Gothic Productions company and released by FBO.

The film is notable as the feature that brought assistant director Josef von Sternberg to the attention of critics for his handling of two sequences in the film.

== Cast ==
- Anna Q. Nilsson as Vanna Du Maurier
- Stuart Holmes as Henri De Greve
- Wyndham Standing as Richard Dowling
- Arthur Rankin as Teddy, Vanna's son
- Lucille Ricksen as Sylvia, Teddy's fiancée
- Robert Bolder as Bill Connors, Theatrical Manager
- Cissy Fitzgerald as Mrs. Connors
- Dot Farley as Katherine, Vanna's Maid
- Charles Newton as Butler
- Rowfat-Bey Haliloff as Dancer

== Production ==
Von Sternberg, in his 1965 autobiography recalls:

Two incidents had been left out of the supposedly completed Vanity’s Price, which the director [Roy William Neill] had not considered worthwhile doing, and the studio [FBO] head now pleaded with me to direct those short episodes.” One of the scenes concerned a young couple on a park bench, in love. The other involved a surgery in which a woman is operated in a therapeutic procedure related to the "Monkey gland" theory of Serge Voronoff.

Von Sternberg writes:

I gave orders to build an operating theatre with a deep pit and circular rows of seats rising steeply above the other to make it look like a cockfight arena. I planned to have the student physicians watch the surgery through binoculars with an occasional ironic grin.

When the picture was previewed this sequence was praised by critics and von Sternberg was offered a position as director at FBO studios, but he turned it down to make an independently financed film, The Salvation Hunters (1925).

== Preservation ==
Vanity's Price is currently presumed lost. In February of 2021, the film was cited by the National Film Preservation Board on their Lost U.S. Silent Feature Films list.

== Sources ==
- Baxter, John. 1971. The Cinema of Josef von Sternberg. London: A. Zwemmer / New York: A. S. Barnes & Co. ISBN 978-0498079917
- Hall, Mordaunt. 1924. THE SCREEN: “A Rejuvenation Story.” The New York Times, October 8, 1924. https://www.nytimes.com/1924/10/08/archives/the-screen-a-rejuvenation-story.html Retrieved 20 May 2024.
- Sternberg, Josef von. 1988. Fun in a Chinese Laundry. Mercury House, San Francisco, California. ISBN 0-916515-37-0 (pbk.)
