= Anatahan (film) =

1953 film by Josef von Sternberg

- American re-release poster
- Directed by: Josef von Sternberg
- Screenplay by: Josef von Sternberg; Tatsuo Asano (also dialogue)
- Produced by: Kazuo Takimura
- Starring: Akemi Negishi; Tadashi Suganuma; Kisaburō Sawamura; Shōji Nakayama
- Narrated by: Josef von Sternberg
- Cinematography: Kōzō Okazaki
- Edited by: Mitsuzō Miyata
- Music by: Akira Ifukube
- Production company: Daiwa Production Inc.
- Distributed by: Toho
- Release date: June 28, 1953
- Running time: 92 minutes
- Country: Japan
- Languages: English; Japanese
- Budget: $375,000

Anatahan (アナタハン), also known by its on-screen title of The Saga of Anatahan, is a 1953 black-and-white Japanese war drama film directed by Josef von Sternberg, with special effects by Eiji Tsuburaya. It was adapted by Sternberg from Michiro Maruyama's nonfiction account of the seven years he and a group of World War II Japanese holdouts spent on Anatahan island, which was then part of the South Seas Mandate of Imperial Japan and is now one of the Northern Mariana Islands of the United States.

The film was the final one directed by Sternberg (although Jet Pilot, which he worked on earlier, was his final film to be released), and he had an unusually high degree of control over the project, which was made outside the studio system, allowing him to not only direct, but also to write, photograph, and narrate. It opened modestly well in Japan in 1953 and was screened in competition at the 14th Venice International Film Festival, but it did poorly in the US, and Sternberg continued to re-cut the film for four more years. Eventually, he abandoned Anatahan and went on to teach film at UCLA for most of the remainder of his life.

== Plot ==
On June 12, 1944, a small fleet of Japanese supply ships are attacked by American planes between Japan and New Guinea. Only twelve seamen, some soldiers and some fishermen drafted into service, are able to make it to the nearby jungle island of Anatahan, where they remain stranded for seven years. The island's only inhabitants are the overseer of an abandoned copra plantation and an attractive young Japanese woman. Discipline is initially enforced by a former warrant officer, but ends when he suffers a catastrophic loss of face, and a struggle for power and possession of the woman develops. Two of the men discover pistols in the wreckage of an American airplane, and, by the time they can be convinced that the war is really over and are rescued in 1951, five of the men are dead. The warrant officer decides to stay on the island, leaving seven men and the woman as the only survivors to return to Japan.

== Cast ==
The "Queen Bee"

- Akemi Negishi as Keiko, the only woman on Anatahan

The "Husband"

- Tadashi Suganuma as Kusakabe, who stabs Yananuma and is stabbed in the jungle by Yoshiri

The 5 "Drones"

- Kisaburo Sawamura as Kuroda, the oldest sailor, who has a beard
- Shōji Nakayama as Nishio, a signalman who finds a gun, stabs Sennba, and is shot twice in the back by Yananuma
- Jun Fujikawa as Yoshiri, a cook who stabs Kusakabe and is shot (probably by Keiko)
- Hiroshi Kondō as Yananuma, a signalman who finds a gun, shoots Nishio, and is stabbed in the back by Kusakabe
- Shozo Miyashita as Sennba, who is stabbed in a hammock by Nishio

The 2 Skippers

- Tsuruemon Bando as Doi
- Kikuji Onoe as Kaneda, captain of the lead boat, the Hyosuke Meru

At the Shamisen

- Rokuriro Kineya as Marui

The Homesick Ones

- Daijiro Tamura as Kanzaki, a lookout, who gets several letters
- Chizuru Kitagawa as Nagasa
- Takeshi Suzuki as Takahashi, the first sailor to approach Keiko

The Patriot

- Shiro Amikura as Warrant Officer Amanuma

Narrator

- Josef von Sternberg (uncredited)

== Background ==
Anatahan, one of the Mariana Islands in Micronesia, was the scene of a wartime stranding of thirty Japanese sailors and soldiers and one Japanese woman in June 1944. The castaways remained in hiding until surrendering to a US Navy rescue team in 1951, six years after Japan was defeated by allied forces. The twenty who survived the ordeal were warmly received upon their return to post-war Japan. International interest, including an article in Life magazine on 16 July 1951, inspired Josef von Sternberg to adapt the story as a fictional film.

By the end of 1951, lurid personal accounts surfaced describing deaths and disappearances on Anatahan arising from inter-male competition for the only woman on the island, Higa Kazuko. These sensationalised depictions produced a backlash in popular opinion, and sympathy for the survivors cooled. The end of the post-war US occupation of Japan in 1952 saw a revival of political and economic sovereignty and a desire among the Japanese to suppress memories of wartime suffering. This "rapid transformation of the political and social climate" negatively influenced perceptions of Anatahan upon its release in Japan the following year.

== Production ==
=== Daiwa and Towa Corporations ===
Daiwa Productions, Inc., an independent Japanese film production company, was founded in 1952 solely for the purpose of making Anatahan. The co-executives included Sternberg, Nagamasa Kawakita, and Yoshio Osawa, the latter two of whom were entrepreneurial international film distributors.

Kawakita established the Towa Trading Company in 1928 to promote an exchange of Japanese and European films in “the urban art cinema market.” He also acted as a representative for German film corporation UFA GmbH in Japan. German director-producer Arnold Fanck joined with Kawakita in 1936 to produce the German-Japanese propaganda film The Daughter of the Samurai (entitled The New Earth in English language releases and Die Tocher der Samurai in Germany) to foster mutual cultural bonds between the countries. Filmed entirely in Japan, the high-profile, big-budget feature was endorsed and promoted by Reich Minister of Propaganda Josef Goebbels in Nazi Germany, where it opened to critical acclaim in 1937.

Sternberg travelled to Japan in 1937, shortly after ending his professional ties with Paramount Pictures and Columbia Pictures. He met with Japanese critics and film enthusiasts who had studied and admired his silent and sound films. Kawakita and Fanck were filming The New Earth at the time, and Sternberg visited them on location to discuss a possible collaboration, but the talks were suspended when war broke out in 1939.

Both Kawakita and Osawa served Imperial Japan throughout the war, producing propaganda films in China and Japan, respectively. When Japan was defeated in 1945, the Supreme Commander for the Allied Powers (SCPA) designated both producers as Class B war criminals, barring them from the Japanese film industry until 1950.

=== Pre-production ===
Sternberg reestablished contact with Kawakita in 1951, and in 1952 the producer agreed to finance a large-budget film based on the Anatahan incident, engaging the Toho company as distributor. Kazuo Takimura was hired as credited producer on the project, with Kawakita and Osawa going uncredited. Eiji Tsuburaya, soon to be renowned for his Godzilla series, was hired as the film's special effects director, the film score and sound effects were created by composer Akira Ifukube, and the 33-year old Kozo Okazaki, then a second unit cameraman, was drafted during pre-production to serve as a cinematographer for the film.

After arriving in Japan in August 1952, Sternberg examined numerous accounts of the Anatahan affair translated into English, some of which were dramatized and lurid, and decided to adapt the memoir of survivor Michiro Maruyama for the film. Scriptwriter Tatsuo Asano was enlisted to add local vernacular to the film's dialogue. Sternberg's narrative requirements reduced the number of participants to thirteen men and one woman and spanned the entire seven years they spent in isolation. The actual number of castaways in 1944 had been reported at 30-32 people, of whom twenty survived.

Unable to obtain permission to use the Toho studio facilities in Tokyo, producer Osawa moved the project to the Okazaki Industrial Park in Kyoto, where multiple open air sets were constructed. Sternberg arrived at the ad hoc studios with two Japanese interpreters and launched a painstaking collaborative process, wielding control over every aspect of the production. When Sternberg was asked by a French critic why he had gone to the Far East to build a studio set to film Anatahan, when he could have constructed an identical set in a Hollywood back lot, he replied "because I am a poet".

A highly detailed storyboard—"the Anatahan Chart"—was prepared, which provided schematics for every aspect of the narrative. Flow charts for actors were colour-coded to indicate timing and intensity of emotions, action, and dialogue, so as to dictate the "psychological and dramatic" continuity of each scene. These visual aids served, in part, to obviate misunderstandings related to language barriers, as Sternberg spoke no Japanese and the crew and actors, which Sternberg selected "based on his first impression by seeing their physical appearance disregarding their acting skills", spoke no English.

=== Filming ===
Production began in December 1952 and ended in February 1953. Virtually the entire film was shot on the stylised and highly crafted sets in Kyoto. The actors in the film speak Japanese, and Sternberg's "disembodied" narration, which explains "the action, events and Japanese culture and rituals", is in English.

== Release ==
Ahead of Anatahan's release in Japan in June 1953, Sternberg produced a pamphlet and issued press statements in which he promised his upcoming film would be an artistic endeavor, pleasing to Japanese audiences, rather than a forensic recreation of a wartime disaster, and said his goal was to create a timeless tale of human isolation—a universal allegory. The premiere and first-run public showings in Tokyo and Kyoto received "lukewarm" support. While Sternberg's English-language narration was subtitled on Japanese prints of the film, the Japanese-language dialogue was not subtitled on American prints of the film.

Producer Kawakita presented The Saga of Anatahan at the 14th Venice International Film Festival in August 1953, where it was overshadowed by another Kawakita entry, director Kenji Mizoguchi’s Ugetsu. When Kawakita edited Anatahan for distribution in Europe, Sternberg’s "monotonous" narration was replaced with that of a Japanese youth, delivering the same text in broken English so as to make it more "authentically" Japanese to English-speaking audiences.

The film received a limited theatrical release in the United States in 1954. Overall, it was a modest commercial success, and investors broke even on the project.

== Reception ==
Critics questioned why Sternberg had adapted a story that might trigger "unpleasant feelings" among many Japanese who had been traumatized by war and defeat, and critical evaluation of the film was uniformly hostile, including a multi-journalist round-table published in Kinema Junpo. As film historian Sachiko Mizuno wrote:

Journalists lambasted the film by severely critiquing Sternberg’s direction, his exotic view, the cast’s amateurish acting, and his idea of making a film out of the story in the first place. They criticized Kawakita and Osawa for granting Sternberg complete control over an expensive film production that only objectified the Japanese on screen.

Writing in the Evening Post, Patrick Fleet was highly critical of the film, saying that "the treatment is generally heavy-handed and at times tedious", and "The film is recommended only for devotees of the 'art of cinema'—and more as a curiosity than anything else."

Criticism was also directed at Sternberg for adopting a sympathetic attitude towards the lone woman on the island and the male survivors. Condemnation of the film was particularly harsh from critic Fuyuhiko Kitagawa, who accused Sternberg of moral relativism and being out of touch with Japanese post-war sentiments.

On the other hand, Anatahan was the favorite film of Jim Morrison of The Doors, who was a film student at UCLA when Sternberg was a professor there, and François Truffaut reportedly cited it as one of the ten best American films ever made.

== See also ==
- Cage on the Sea, a 1998 novel by Japanese author Kaoru Ohno inspired by the same events

== Sources ==
- Baxter, John. 1971. The Cinema of Josef von Sternberg. The International Film Guide Series. A.S Barners & Company, New York.
- Eyman, Scott. 2017. Sternberg in Full: Anatahan. Film Comment, May 15, 1017. Retrieved 29 May 2018. https://www.filmcomment.com/blog/sternberg-full-anatahan/
- Gallagher, Tag. 2002. Josef von Sternberg. Senses of Cinema, March 2002. Retrieved 29 May 2018. http://sensesofcinema.com/2002/feature-articles/sternberg/
- Mizuno, Sachiko. 2009. The Saga of Anatahan and Japan. Transnationalism and Film Genres in East Asian Cinema. Dong Hoon Kom, editor, Spectator 29:2 (Fall 2009): 9-24 http://cinema.usc.edu/assets/096/15618.pdf Retrieved 24 May 2018.
- Rosenbaum, Jonathan. 1978. Aspects of Anatahan. Posted January 11, 1978. Retrieved 23. January, 2021. https://www.jonathanrosenbaum.net/2020/12/aspects-of-anatahan-tk/
- Sarris, Andrew: The Films of Josef von Sternberg. New York: Doubleday, 1966. ASIN B000LQTJG4
