= The Masked Bride =

1925 film

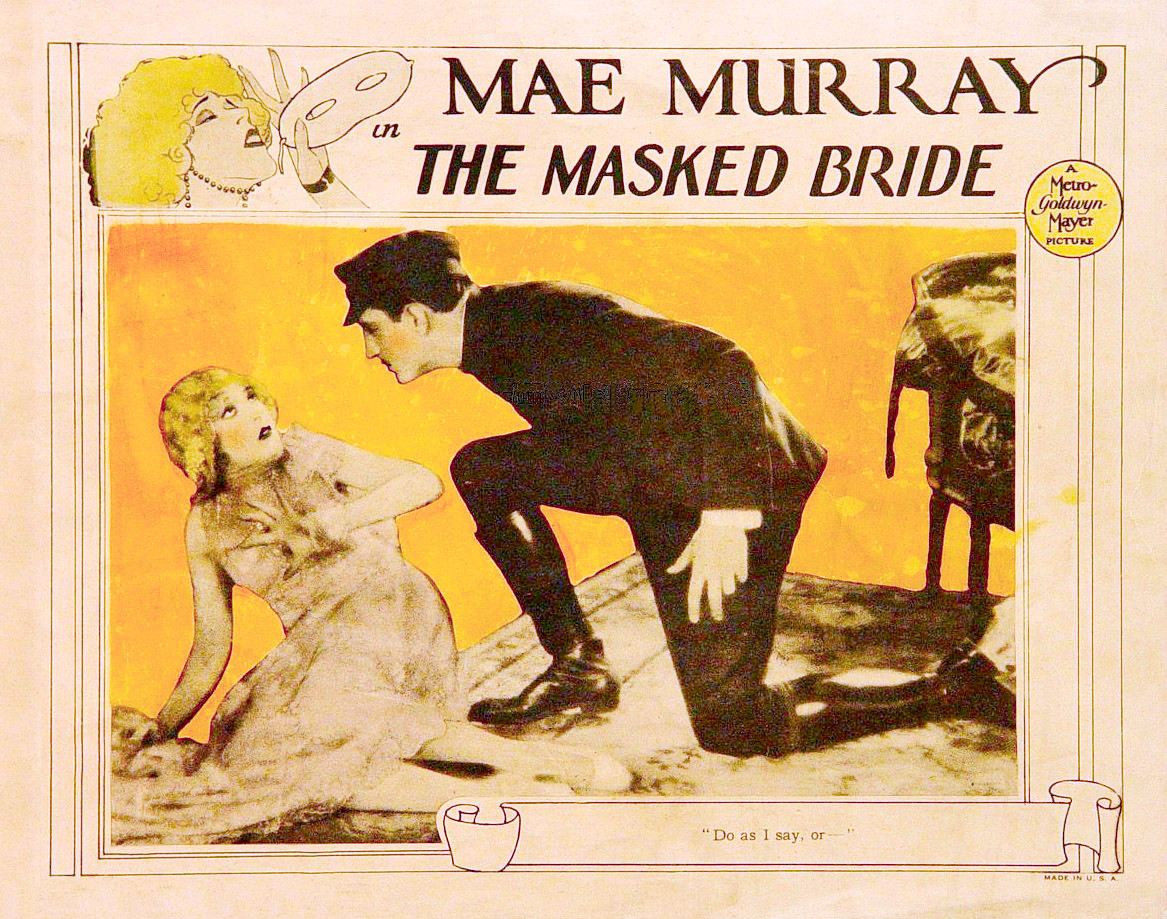
- Lobby card
- Directed by: Christy Cabanne; Josef von Sternberg (uncredited)
- Written by: Carey Wilson (scenario)
- Story by: Leon Abrams
- Starring: Mae Murray; Francis X. Bushman; Basil Rathbone
- Cinematography: Oliver Marsh
- Production company: Metro-Goldwyn-Mayer
- Distributed by: Metro-Goldwyn-Mayer
- Release date: December 13, 1925
- Running time: 68 minutes
- Country: United States
- Language: Silent (English intertitles)

The Masked Bride is a lost 1925 American silent romantic drama film directed by Christy Cabanne and starring Mae Murray, Francis X. Bushman, and Basil Rathbone. The film was both produced and distributed by Metro-Goldwyn-Mayer.

== Plot ==
As described in a review in a film magazine, Gaby is an Apache dancer at a cabaret in the Montmartre section of Paris whose dancing partner Antoine and friends are thieves. She meets Grover, an American millionaire who is a reformer and making a study of crime. She kids him along, even falling in with her partners' scheme to rob him of a valuable necklace. She plays the game to the extent of preparing for the ceremony, but her better self comes to the fore when she realizes the depth of the American's love and the duplicity of her sweetheart who chose the necklace in preference to her. She finds happiness as the American's wife.

== Cast ==
- Mae Murray as Gaby
- Francis X. Bushman as Grover
- Roy D'Arcy as Prefect of Police
- Basil Rathbone as Antoine
- Pauline Neff as Grover's Sister
- Chester Conklin as Wine Waiter
- Fred Warren as Vibout
- Leo White as Floor Manager

== Production ==
Josef von Sternberg was originally hired to direct the film. After two weeks of filming, he became frustrated with Mae Murray's behavior on the set and ordered the cameramen to film the rafters. He eventually walked out on the picture and was replaced by Christy Cabanne.

Filming began in early August 1925, and a large Parisian cafe set was constructed at the Culver City MGM studios. In the picture, Mae Murray wears a necklace composed of ninety "violet phosphorescent" diamonds, which Moving Picture World claimed was the only one in existence. They also claimed the necklace was insured for $300,000.

== Reception ==
The Film Daily review was mixed, finding the story to be weak, but the settings lavish and Mae Murray to be entertaining.

The Moving Picture World reviewer C.S. Sewell gave the film a positive review, despite describing the plot as "highly improbable." Mae Murray's performance and dancing were praised, as well as the performances of the rest of the cast. The reviewer noted the return of Francis X. Bushman after two years of absence from the screen, and described his appearance as "handsome as ever."

Variety's review was mostly negative, describing the film as "a melodrama of the hoakiest kind" and the production as if "made in a rush."

== Preservation ==
With no holdings located in archives, The Masked Bride is considered a lost film.
