= Alden Brooks =

American writer

Alden Brooks was an American writer, chiefly remembered for his proposal that Sir Edward Dyer wrote the works of William Shakespeare.

== Career ==
=== World War I ===
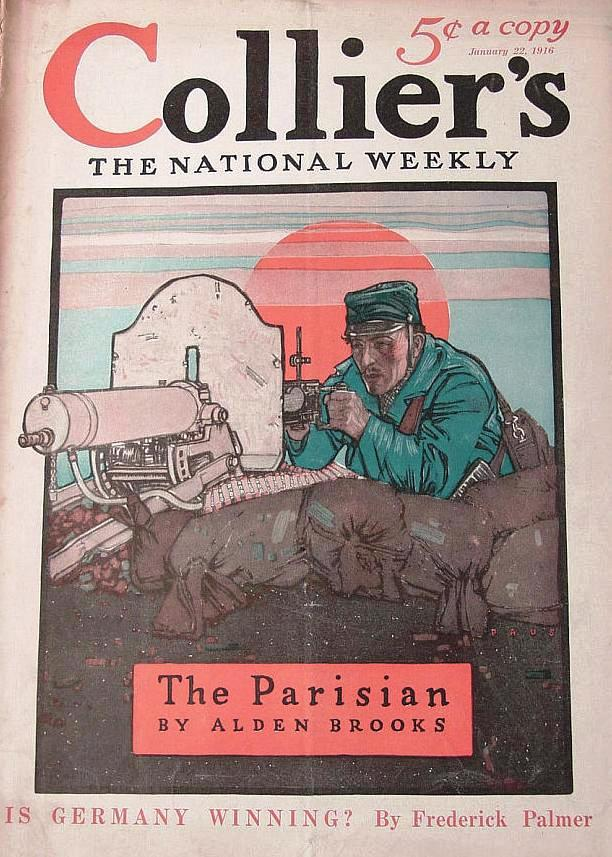
Brooks's pieces originally written during WW I for Collier's were collected for his first book.

World War I broke out while Brooks was in France, and he became an ambulance driver and subsequently a newspaper correspondent for The New York Times and Collier's. He eventually took up duty as an ambulance driver for American troops on the front line. He was eager to join the A.E.F and thought the quickest way would be to study in a French artillery school. He served with the French Army and rose to the rank of lieutenant of a field battery, after his petition for transfer to the American forces was turned down on the grounds of poor eyesight. He saw action at Marne, Chemin-des-Dames, Chateau-Thierry and Meuse-Argonne, and was awarded the Croix de Guerre with a silver star for gallantry while engaged in special missions in France on July 15 and 16, 1918. He deplored much of what he saw, including how General Robert Lee Bullard sent American troops to fight and die even though the Armistice was due to be declared in a few hours, and wrote of war's folly:

War is stupid, insensate, unheroic to the last degree. War is not waged like a game. Analogies of the football field and of the chessboard are completely erroneous. War is a brutal chaos, governed by no laws.

Brooks published his first book, The Fighting Men, in 1917. It consisted of a series of six short sketches depicting the respective psychological and behavioral traits of an ethnic group of soldiers, respectively English, Slav, American, French, Belgian and Prussian.

Brooks lived for a long period in France, and his home in Paris, Maison Brooks built at 80 boulevard Arago in 1929, was designed by the architect Paul Nelson. His experiences of the war are recounted in his 1929 book Battle in 1918, As Seen by an American in the French Army, published in the United States as As I Saw It.

=== Shakespeare authorship theories ===
Aside from a novel, Escape (1924), Brooks wrote extensively on the Shakespeare authorship question, and in 1937 produced a preliminary volume, Will Shakspere: Factotum and Agent, in an attempt to prove that Shakespeare did not write the works attributed to him. In this book, Shakespeare is considered to be a pseudonym, and the sonnets are attributed to Thomas Nashe, Samuel Daniel, Barnabe Barnes and some other editorial hand. A contemporary scholar reviewing Brooks's ideas commented that although "there is absolutely no evidence to support any of his statements [this] disturbed neither Brooks nor his publishers."

Six years later, he fulfilled his earlier promise of identifying the supposed real author by publishing Will Shakspere and the Dyer's Hand (1943) declaring that Sir Edward Dyer was the true author. His methodology consisted of specifying 54 criteria or qualifications which worked to the exclusion of the many false claimants the establishment of the true author's identity, only all of which his candidate, Sir Edward Dyer, was thought to meet in "concordance with the pattern". The book, in the ironical words of one historian of the phenomenon, "did not ignite a crusade".

William Shakespeare was, in Brooks' imaginative reconstruction, little more than a "fool, knave, usurer, vulgar showman, illiterate, bluffer, philander, pander, and brothel keeper" who however acted at the same time as the literary agent of Dyer, the concealed author. An anonymous reviewer for Time magazine summed up the plot in the following way:

He depicts Shakespeare as a butcher's son in Stratford, "a country youth who has to leave school early in order to assist his father in the killing of cattle ... one who sows his wild oats so liberally that he must, first, marry against his will a woman eight years his senior, and, secondly, run away to London, apparently to escape legal prosecution." ... in London he got a job holding theatergoers' horses. Soon he earned enough money to rent out theatrical costumes and furnishings. Something of a wit in his coarse way, he began editing plays for production, soon became a play agent, buying and renting the works of others. On the side he kept a brothel: "In his tavern in Deadman's Lane, sub-leased to Widow Lee, Will Shakspere ... created ... a roistering hubbub." His "broken, almost falsetto voice" became a feature of London life. His "fat body" was soon "taxed by excesses." Many suffered from "his scheming tricks ... his dirty dealing and underhand passing of coin, all the shabby pretense in the double-faced glutton and roisterer." Meanwhile a grey-haired courtier with "wrinkled visage, deep-set eyes ... walked nervously in the gardens" a stone's throw from Will's brothel. The courtier's name was Sir Edward Dyer, known to literati mainly as the author of a rather smug poem called My Mind to Me a Kingdom Is. No one guessed his secret, but for years, says Author Brooks, Dyer had been getting Shakespeare to buy bad plays for him and had rewritten them into the classics we read today.

He overcame the problem that Dyer died in 1607, several years before Shakespeare's The Tempest is believed to have been written, by arguing that this was early work, which he believed was proven by its appearance as the first play in the 1623 Folio edition of Shakespeare's plays.

== Personal life and legacy ==
Brooks married Hilma Chadwick, an artist, at St Ives, Cornwall, England, on 11 July 1908, and moved to France. They had four children.

Brook's vivid depictions of soldiers and war have been highly praised by specialists. Phillip K. Jason argues that he wrote "two of the most intriguing books about World War 1." His research attempting to reveal Sir Edward Dyer behind Shakespeare have usually been dismissed as fantasies. William M. Murphy writes:

To a man who can tell us so much about Shakespeare on no visible evidence, no flight of illogical fancy is impossible.

He has, however, decisively influenced one recent independent researcher into the authorship heterodoxy. Diana Price, in her book Shakespeare's Unorthodox Biography (2001) writes on her acknowledgements page of "the ground-breaking research of Alden Brooks".

== Bibliography ==
- Escape, Charles Scribner's Sons, New York, 1924
- As I Saw It, Knopf, New York, 1930
- Will Shakspere: Factotum and Agent, 1937
- Will Shakspere and the Dyer's Hand, 1943
