= Francis X. Bushman filmography =

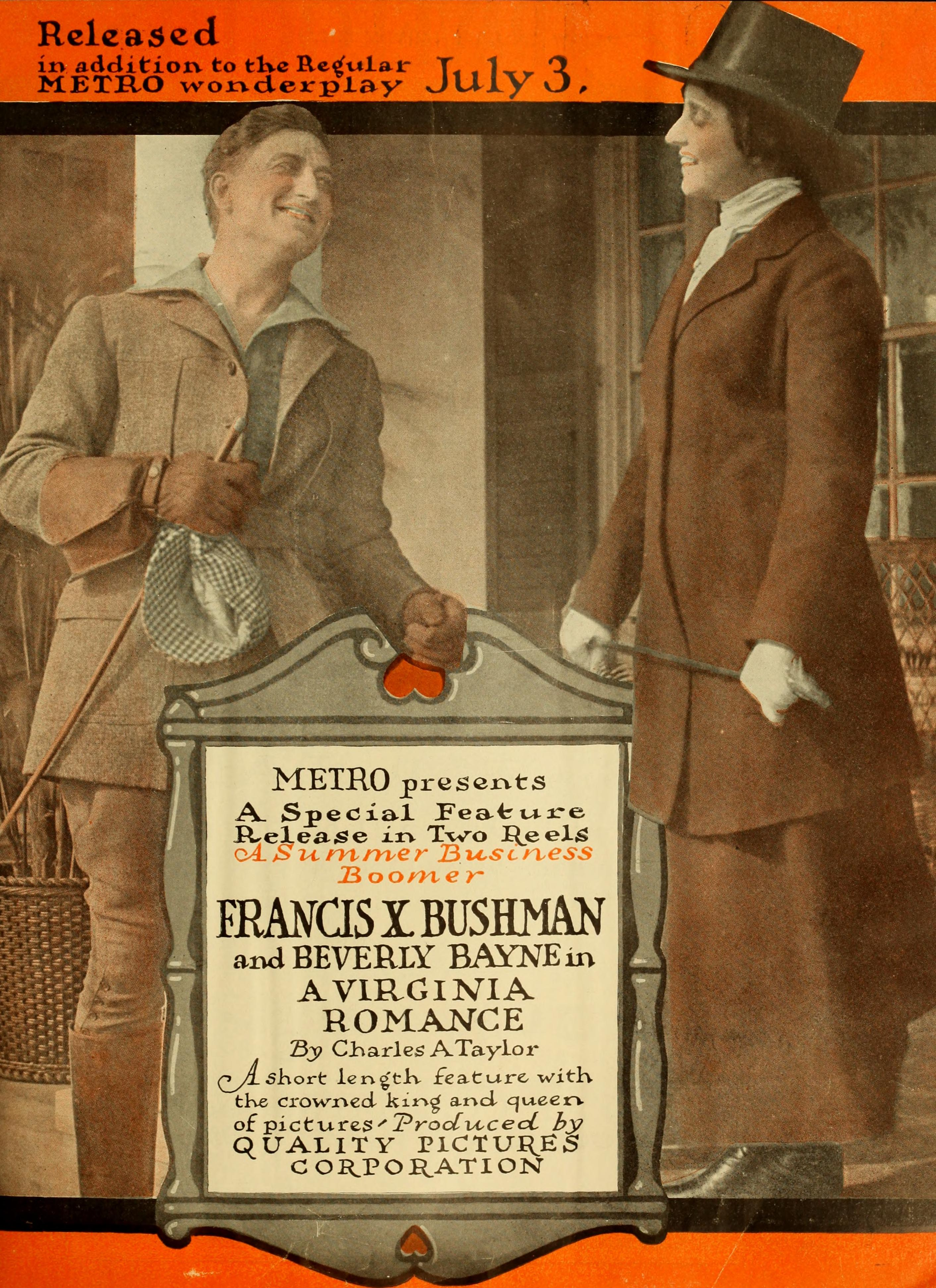
A Virginia Romance (1916)

This page is devoted to the film and television work of Francis X. Bushman. It encompasses the years 1911-66.

== 1911 ==
- His Friend's Wife as The Artist
- The Rosary as Young Payne
- Her Dad the Constable as Tom Thornton
- God's Inn by the Sea as Chaplain Crandall
- The New Manager as Phillip Carlton
- The Gordian Knot as Harry Robins
- Live, Love and Believe as Harry Ainsworth
- Fate's Funny Frolic as Richard Malcolm
- The Playwright as Frank Richardson
- Putting It Over as George Moore Tenth
- The Dark Romance of a Tobacco Tin as George M. Jackson
- Two Men and a Girl as John Lincoln
- The Burglarized Burglar as Howard Graham
- Saved from the Torrents as Arthur Chester
- Lost Years as James Brown
- Reparation as David Warren
- A False Suspicion as John Barton, The Husband
- Pals as Fred
- Bill Bumper's Bargain as Mephisto
- He Fought for the U.S.A. as Frank Langdon - First Brother
- The Empty Saddle as John Twenty
- Too Much Turkey as himself
- The Quinceville Raffle as Ezra Higgins
- The Madman as The Madman
- The Long Strike as Jim Blakely
- The Goodfellow's Christmas Eve as James Sawyer
- For Memory's Sake as Jim

== 1912 ==
- Daydream of a Photoplay Artist
- The Mail Order Wife
- The Old Florist
- The Little Poet
- Alias Billy Sargent
- A Brother's Error
- The Hospital Baby
- The Melody of Love
- Her Boys
- Tracked Down
- The Little Black Box
- The Turning Point
- Out of the Depths
- At the End of the Trail
- Teaching a Liar a Lesson
- Lonesome Robert
- The Rivals
- Napatia, the Greek Singer
- Out of the Night
- The Eye That Never Sleeps
- A Good Catch
- The Laurel Wreath of Fame
- The Mis-Sent Letter
- The Passing Show
- Return of William Marr
- Billy and the Butler
- White Roses
- The Butterfly Net
- Signal Lights
- The Understudy
- Her Hour of Triumph
- The New Church Organ
- The Old Wedding Dress
- The Magic Wand
- Twilight
- The Fall of Montezuma
- Neptune's Daughter
- The Voice of Conscience
- The End of the Feud
- The Warning Hand
- Chains
- When Wealth Torments
- The House of Pride
- The Penitent
- The Iron Heel
- The Error of Omission
- The Virtue of Rags
- The Cat's Paw
- Requited Love

== 1913 ==
- Little Ned
- When Soul Meets Soul (extant;Library of Congress)
- The Thirteenth Man
- The Farmer's Daughter
- The Discovery
- A Mistaken Accusation
- The Pathway of Years
- The Spy's Defeat
- Let No Man Put Asunder
- A Brother's Loyalty
- The Whip Hand
- The Power of Conscience
- The Hermit of Lonely Gulch
- Sunlight
- The Right of Way
- For Old Time's Sake
- Tony, the Fiddler
- Dear Old Girl
- The Way Perilous
- The Toll of the Marshes
- The Little Substitute
- The Stigma

== 1914 ==
- Hearts and Flowers as John Martin
- The Hour and the Man as Frank Maxwell
- Through the Storm as Andy Burton
- The Girl at the Curtain as Warren Bradley
- Dawn and Twilight as Pietro Delani, a Blind Musician
- The Other Girl as Frank Dixon
- Shadows as Secret Service Agent Dan Grayson
- The Three Scratch Clue as Norman Arnold
- In the Moon's Ray as Richard Neal
- The Man for A'That as Frank Willard
- Yarn a-Tangle
- The Mystery of Room 643 as Richard Neal
- Mongrel and Master as Frank Mitchell, the Master
- Ashes of Hope as Fred Willard
- The Voice in the Wilderness as Frank - the Author
- Blood Will Tell as Richard Brimsmore
- The Elder Brother as Dr. Phillip Caldwell - the Elder Brother
- Jane as The Red-Haired Man
- Finger Prints as Richard Neal
- The Countess (as Richard Hasbrook
- Trinkets of Tragedy as Harrison Hyde
- A Night with a Million as Jack Wilton
- The Night Hawks as Humphrey
- His Stolen Fortune as Frank Wentworth
- One Wonderful Night
- The Motor Buccaneers as William Mash
- The Masked Wrestler as Louis de Luzon
- Ambushed as Frank Mitchell
- Under Royal Patronage as Richard Savage
- The Plum Tree as Craig Ewell
- Sparks of Fate as Frank Graham
- A Splendid Dishonor as Frank Sergeant
- The Other Man as Harry Ross
- In the Glare of the Lights as Glen Duval
- The Private Officer as Harry Lampton / Lt. Frothingham
- The Unplanned Elopement as Frank Melbourne
- The Prince Party as Prince Francis of Fournia
- Scars of Possession as Payne Forsythe
- The Battle of Love as Arthur Chandler

== 1915 ==
- The Fable of the Bush League Lover Who Failed to Qualify as The Matinee Idol
- Every Inch a King as King Leofric of Vidonia
- The Battle of Love as Arthur Chandler
- Any Woman's Choice as The Mutual Friend
- The Shanty at Trembling Hill as Richard Scott
- The Gallantry of Jimmy Rodgers as Jimmy Rodgers
- The Ambition of the Baron as Count Jean de Lugnan
- Thirteen Down as Arnold Austin
- The Accounting as Gordon Bannock
- Stars Their Courses Change as Robert Cameron
- The Great Silence as John Landon
- Graustark (survives) as Grenfall Lorry
- The Return of Richard Neal as Richard Neal
- Thirty (Short) as Dick Thompson
- The Slim Princess as Alexander H. Pike
- Providence and Mrs. Urmy as Barton the Chauffeur & Lord Chilminster
- The Second in Command (survives) as Lt. Col. Miles Anstruther
- The Silent Voice as Franklyn Starr
- Pennington's Choice (survives) as Robert Pennington

== 1916 ==
- Man and His Soul as John Conscience / John Power
- The Red Mouse
- The Wall Between (survives)
- A Million A Minute as Stephen Quaintance
- The Voice in the Darkness
- A Virginia Romance as Ralph Everly
- In the Diplomatic Service (survives) as Dick Stansbury
- Romeo and Juliet as Romeo

== 1917 ==
- The Great Secret as William Montgomery Strong
- Their Compact as James Van Dyke Moore
- The Adopted Son as Two Gun Carter
- The Voice of Conscience (survives) as William Poatter / James Houston
- Red, White and Blue Blood as John Spaulding

== 1918 ==
- Under Suspicion as Gerry Simpson
- The Brass Check as Richard Trevor
- With Neatness and Dispatch as Paul Donaldson
- Cyclone Higgins, D.D. as Cyrus 'Cyclone' Higgins, D.D.
- Social Quicksands as Warren Dexter
- A Pair of Cupids as Peter Warburton

== 1919 ==
- The Poor Rich Man (survives) as Vantyne Carter
- God's Outlaw as Andrew Craig
- Daring Hearts as Hugh Brown

== 1920s ==
- Smiling All the Way (1920) as Doubtful Cameo Appearance (uncredited)
- According to Hoyle (1922)
- Making the Grade (1922)
- Modern Marriage (1923, survives) as Hugh Varley
- The Masked Bride (1925) as Grover
- Ben-Hur: A Tale of the Christ (1925, survives) as Messala
- Playing the Swell (1926)
- The Marriage Clause (1926, survives in a one reel cut down version) as Barry Townsend
- The Lady in Ermine (1927) as Gen. Dostal
- The Flag (1927) as George Washington
- The Thirteenth Juror (1927) as Henry Desmond
- Una nueva y gloriosa nacion (1928) as Belgrano
- The Grip of the Yukon (1928) as Colby MacDonald
- Say It with Sables (1928) as John Caswell
- Midnight Life (1928) as Jim Logan

== 1930s ==
- Call of the Circus (1930) as The Man
- The Dude Wrangler (1930) as Canby
- Once a Gentleman (1930) as Bannister
- Watch Beverly (1932) as President Orloff
- Hollywood Boulevard (1936) as Frank - Director, Desert Scene
- Dick Tracy (1937, Serial) as Chief Clive Anderson
- Thoroughbreds Don't Cry (1937) as Racing Steward (uncredited)

== 1940s ==
- Peer Gynt (1941) (voice)
- Mr. Celebrity (1941) as himself
- Silver Queen (1942) as Creditor
- Wilson (1944) as Bernard Baruch (uncredited)

== 1950s ==
- Hollywood Story (1951) as himself
- David and Bathsheba (1951) as King Saul (uncredited)
- Apache Country (1952) as Commissioner Latham
- The Bad and the Beautiful (1952) as Eulogist (uncredited)
- Sabrina (1954) as Mr. Tyson
- The Story of Mankind (1957) as Moses

== 1960s ==
- 12 to the Moon (1960) as Secretary General of the International Space Order
- The Phantom Planet (1961) as Sessom
- The Ghost in the Invisible Bikini (1966) as Malcolm
