= The Rosary =

The Rosary may refer to:

- Rosary, Roman Catholic prayer beads
- The Rosary (house), a moated house built by Edward II in Southwark
- The Rosary (novel), a 1909 novel by Florence L. Barclay
- The Rosary, 1910 play by Edward Everett Rose
- The Rosary (1911 film)
- The Rosary, 1915 film by Colin Campbell
- The Rosary (1922 film)
- The Rosary (1931 film), a British film directed by Guy Newall
- "The Rosary", song by Ethelbert Nevin

== See also ==
- Rosary (disambiguation)
