= Saved from the Torrents =

- Produced by: G. M. Anderson
- Starring: Francis X. Bushman
- Production company: Essanay Studios
- Distributed by: General Film Company
- Release date: September 11, 1911
- Running time: 1 reel
- Country: USA
- Language: Silent..English titles

Saved from the Torrents is a 1911 silent drama film short produced by the Essanay Studios and released by the General Film Company. It was released in split-reel format with another Essanay film Live, Love and Believe.

== Plot ==
Jack Carrington is a listless young man prone to the vices of gambling and drink, and is unshaken by Katie, his sister's, pleas. He has fallen into bad company and runs away from home and takes up residence in the next town over, where he gets into trouble. Katie is the object of affection by Arthur Chester, a station agent, who informs her that her brother is evading the police and will be taking the express train back home. Katie bars Chester from the station office so that he can't deliver news that would lead to Jack's arrest. Unfortunately, the train that Jack is on is hurtling towards a trestle that is in danger of being swept away by the Chippewa River. Becoming aware of her brother's danger, Katie and her lover rush to stop the train before it plummets into the river. They race to the scene on a hand car, where they cross over the trestle and stop the train safely, where just moments later, the trestle falls into the river. Jack spends a short while in jail and becomes reformed, and Katie and Chester are married.

== Cast ==
- Francis X. Bushman - Arthur Chester
- Dorothy Phillips - Katie Carrington
- Bryant Washburn - Jack Carrington, Katie's Brother

== See also ==
- Francis X. Bushman filmography
