= Lily Branscombe =

New Zealand actress

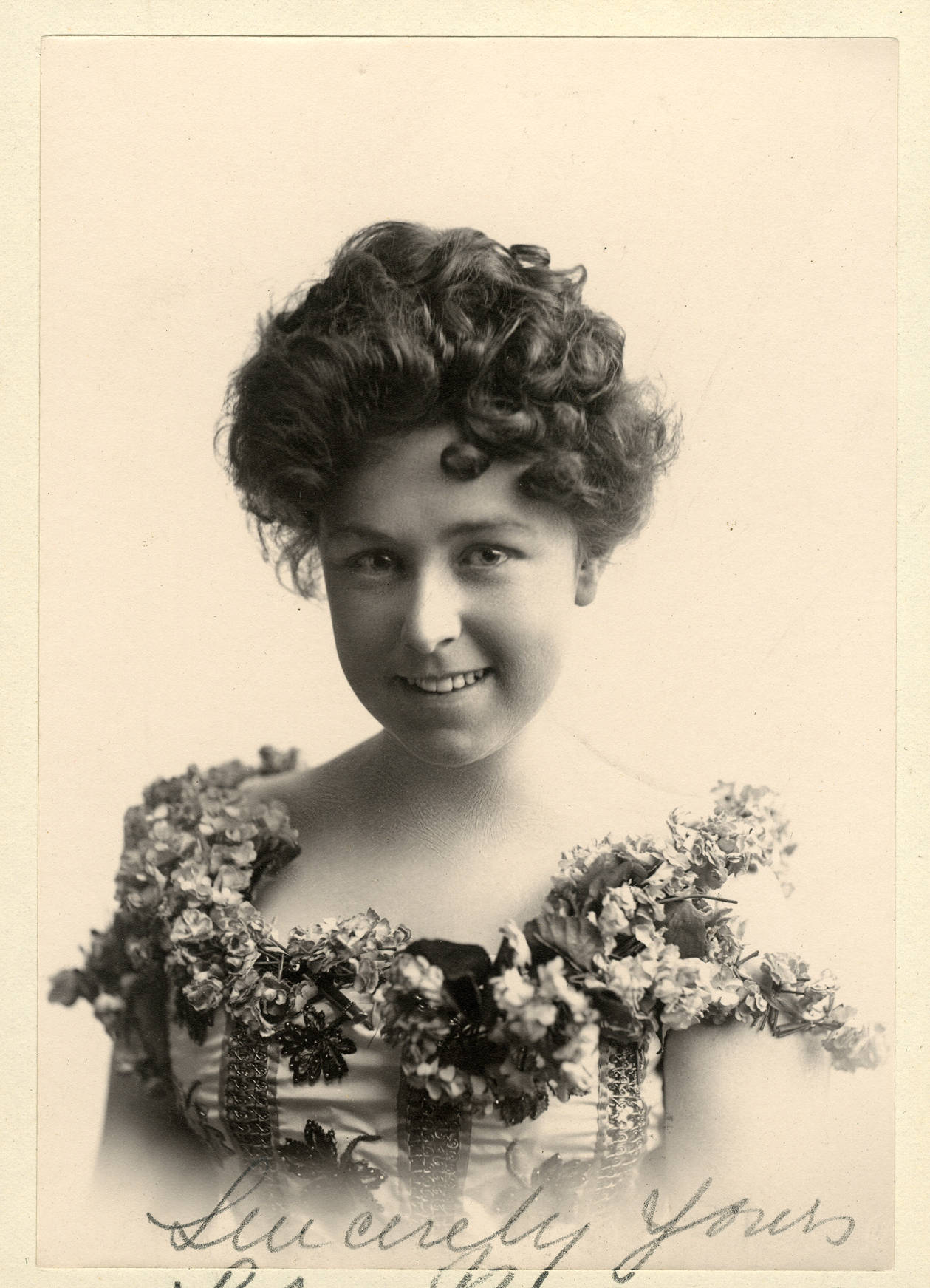
- Branscombe in 1901
- Born: Lillian Rodman; February 28, 1876; Carterton, New Zealand
- Died: September 26, 1970 (aged 94); San Francisco, California, U.S.
- Occupations: Stage, film actress
- Years active: 1890–1912
- Spouse: Herbert Ashton (m. 1900)

Lily Branscombe (born Lillian Rodman, February 28, 1876 – September 26, 1970) was a stage and film actress from New Zealand.

== Biography ==
Branscombe was born as Lillian Rodman in Carterton, in the North Island of New Zealand, and educated in New South Wales, Australia. She acted with the Maggie Moore Company in Australia and New Zealand before moving to the United States of America around 1900. There, she acted with the Frawley Company and later in silent films produced by the Essanay Company, opposite stars such as Francis X. Bushman, Bryant Washburn, and John Steppling. She also appeared in a number of episodes of the short comedic film series Alkali Ike in 1911 and 1912.

== Personal life ==
In 1900, she married Herbert Ashton in San Francisco.

== Filmography ==
- He Fought for the U.S.A. (1911)
- The Goodfellow's Christmas Eve (1911)
- For Memory's Sake, 1911
- Alias Billy Sargent (1912)
- Detective Dorothy, 1912
- The Melody of Love, 1912
- Her Hour of Triumph,1912
- The Snare (1912)
