= The Long Strike =

1911 silent short film

- Produced by: Essanay Studios; G. M. Anderson
- Starring: Francis X. Bushman
- Distributed by: General Film Company
- Release date: December 7, 1911
- Running time: 1 reel
- Country: USA
- Language: Silent..English titles

The Long Strike is a 1911 silent film drama short produced by the Essanay Studios. It was distributed by the General Film Company.

== Cast ==
- Francis X. Bushman - Jim Blakely
- Bryant Washburn - Bert Readly
- Harry Cashman - Noah Dixon
- Tom Shirley - Bob Dixon (*Tommy Shirley)

== See also ==
- Francis X. Bushman filmography
