= The Burglarized Burglar =

- Directed by: R. F. Baker (*Richard Foster Baker)
- Produced by: Essanay Studios
- Starring: Francis X. Bushman; Dorothy Phillips
- Distributed by: General Film Company
- Release date: September 15, 1911
- Running time: short
- Country: USA
- Language: Silent..English titles

The Burglarized Burglar is a 1911 silent film crime short directed by R. F. Baker(Richard Foster Baker) with Francis X. Bushman and Dorothy Phillips in the leads and an early role by later star Bryant Washburn. It was produced by the Essanay Studios(Chicago) and distributed by the General Film Company.

== Cast ==
- Francis X. Bushman - Howard Graham
- Dorothy Phillips - Dorothy Willard
- Bryant Washburn - The Burglar (?unconfirmed)
- Harry Cashman - Mr. Willard
- Eleanor Blanchard - Mrs. Willard
- William Walters - Policeman

== See also ==
- Francis X. Bushman filmography
