= The Playwright =

1911 silent short film

- Starring: Francis X. Bushman
- Production company: Essanay Studios
- Distributed by: General Film Company
- Release date: August 29, 1911
- Running time: 1 reel
- Country: USA
- Language: Silent..English titles

The Playwright is a 1911 American silent short drama film starring Francis X. Bushman. It was produced at the Essanay Studios, Chicago and released by the General Film Company.

== Plot ==
According to a film magazine, "Frank Richardson is writing a play his first play. Imbued with a feeling that his work is one of more than ordinary value and that great success awaits him when it is finished, he labors day and night, sometimes without eating or sleeping. His finances, however, have run low and he is one day awakened to the necessity of his earning at least enough to pay for his room and aboard. But the play nearly finished and until he is turned out of his room and his typewriter taken from him, does he realize his position. He finishes the play on a park bench and with great confidence of its success, visits a theatrical manager. Here his reception is cold and he is turned down by the manager, who refuses to even look at the manuscript. He tries another one and in despair is again turned down. Undaunted, he returns to the first manager, but unable to see him, leaves the manuscript with a clerk, who, after the young man has departed, throws the manuscript into a waste basket. The manager, entering at the moment rescues the manuscript and glances through it. His interest is immediately aroused as delighted, he realizes he has made a find. The young playwright, in the meantime, has fallen in a faint on the street and is rescued by a young lady and her mother, who give him a room in their house. The daughter and the playwright fall in love and a few days later they read a personal in the paper, advertising for Frank Richardson, author of "The Golden Age." whose play is to be produced. In delight, Richardson visits the office of the theatrical manager, who presents Richardson with a good sized check, advanced royalties on his play."

== Cast ==
- Francis X. Bushman

== See also ==
- Francis X. Bushman filmography
