= God's Inn by the Sea =

- Directed by: R. F. Baker (*Richard Foster Baker)
- Produced by: Essanay Film Manufacturing Company
- Starring: Francis X. Bushman
- Distributed by: General Film Company
- Release date: July 31, 1911
- Running time: 1 reel
- Country: USA
- Language: Silent..English intertitles

God's Inn by the Sea is a 1911 American silent short drama film directed by R.F. Baker (Richard Foster Baker) and starring Francis X. Bushman. It was produced by the Essanay Film Manufacturing Company and distributed by the General Film Company. Released in split-reel form with Her Dad the Constable.

== Plot ==
According to a film magazine, "Learning that his schooner, "Petrel," on which his five-year-old daughter, Dora, and a crew of thirty men had been lost at sea after two days out at Liverpool, Commodore Leighton, hopeful that his daughter might have been saved, offers $5,000 reward for her return. Not until ten years later, when he again advertises for the girl does he obtain any clue to her whereabouts. In the advertisement there had been a reproduced tattoo design, a duplicate of one on the girl's left ankle. Thinking that they can easily obtain the reward, a man and woman employ a young girl, on whom they place the mark of identification, but their scheme is spoiled when it is found that the tattoo mark is of a recent date. About this time a pleasure party cruising out of Liverpool, land at an unfrequented island, where Chaplain Crandal, who is a personal friend of Commodore Leighton, meets a young woman on whom he finds the tattoo mark which seems to identify her as the lost Dora Leighton. Communicating with Commodore Leighton, Crandal inquires further into the girl's history and makes certain that she is Leighton's daughter. The old commodore arrives a week later, and is satisfied that the girl is his daughter. A happy reunion takes place, followed shortly after by the marriage of Crandal and Dora."

== Cast ==
- Francis X. Bushman

== See also ==
Francis X. Bushman filmography
