= When Soul Meets Soul =

1913 silent short film

- Directed by: Norman McDonald
- Produced by: Essanay Studios
- Starring: Francis X. Bushman; Dolores Cassinelli
- Distributed by: General Film Company
- Release date: January 3, 1913
- Running time: 1 reels
- Country: USA
- Language: Silent..English titles

When Soul Meets Soul is a 1913 silent film romantic fantasy short directed by Norman MacDonald and produced by the Essanay Studios out of Chicago. It starred Francis X. Bushman and Dolores Cassinelli. It was produced by the Essanay Studios and distributed by the General Film Company.

This film survives in the Library of Congress collection.

== Cast ==
- Francis X. Bushman - Prince Arames/Professor Delaplane
- Dolores Cassinelli - Princess Charazel
- Fred Wulf - Professor's Assistant
- Beverly Bayne - 1st Egyptian Lady
- Ruth Stonehouse - 2nd Egyptian Lady
- Mildred Watson - 3rd Egyptian Lady
- Eva Prout - Serving Girl

unbilled

- Helen Dunbar -
- Bryant Washburn

== See also ==
- Francis X. Bushman filmography
