= The Spy's Defeat =

- Directed by: Harry McRae Webster
- Written by: Harry McRae Webster
- Produced by: Essanay Studios
- Starring: Francis X. Bushman; Ruth Stonehouse
- Distributed by: General Film Company
- Release date: March 31, 1913
- Running time: 2 reels
- Country: USA
- Language: Silent..English titles

The Spy's Defeat is a 1913 silent film drama short directed by Harry McRae Webster and starring Francis X. Bushman and Ruth Stonehouse. It was produced by the Essanay Film Manufacturing Company and released by the General Film Company.

== Cast ==
- Francis X. Bushman - Lt. Carl Heinrich
- Ruth Stonehouse - Fredericka
- Frank Dayton - Count Plentoff, The Spy
- Lillian Drew - Olga
- William Walters - Von Metzing, The Russian
- Bryant Washburn

== See also ==
- Francis X. Bushman filmography
