= Rosary (disambiguation) =

The Rosary usually refers to the Catholic Marian devotional prayers.

It may also refer to:

- A rosary, the prayer beads themselves
- Other rosary-based prayers in Christian contexts
- Similar devotional prayers in other denominations and faiths
- Rosary, a coin minted in Europe as a counterfeit form of the sterling silver penny of Edward I
- Rosary Lakes, a group of lakes in Oregon
- "Rosary" (song), by Don Toliver featuring Travis Scott
- The Rosary (disambiguation)
