= The Goodfellow's Christmas Eve =

- Produced by: Essanay Studios; G. M. Anderson
- Distributed by: General Film Company
- Release date: December 15, 1911
- Running time: 1 reel
- Country: USA
- Language: Silent..English titles

The Goodfellow's Christmas Eve is a 1911 silent film short starring Francis X. Bushman and produced by the Essanay Studios. It was released through the General Film Company.

== Cast ==
- Francis X. Bushman - James Sawyer
- Harry Cashman
- Eva Prout
- Lily Branscombe
- Frank Dayton
- William Walters
- Whitney Raymond

== See also ==
- Francis X. Bushman filmography
