= A False Suspicion =

1911 silent short film

- Starring: Francis X. Bushman
- Production company: Essanay Studios
- Distributed by: General Film Company
- Release date: October 17, 1911
- Running time: 1 reel
- Country: USA
- Language: Silent...English titles

A False Suspicion is a 1911 American silent drama film short produced by the Essanay Studios. It starred Francis X. Bushman and was distributed by the General Film Company.

== Plot ==
Mildred Barton has a habit of spending too much on extravagant clothing, and her husband tells her that he will no longer be responsible for their cost. Soon after, her friend Mrs. Landor invites her on a shopping trip where she induced to buy a ludicrously expensive opera cloak, which she charges to her account. She continues to buy more and is harassed by creditors. When she fails to get a loan from a money lender, she asks to borrow money from a gentleman friend of the family, Richard Lee. Her husband finds the signed receipts from Lee, and interrogates his wife on her relationship with him, where she reveals that she borrowed money from him. Mildred is distraught by her husband's treatment of her, and goes to bed alone. In the morning, a letter arrives from Lee, apologetic for lending her the money and misreading their friendship as something more, and telling her that he is leaving town. When her husband reads the letter, he immediately understands that he was cruel and suspicious for no good reason.

== Cast ==
- Francis X. Bushman - John Barton, The Husband
- Bryant Washburn - Richard Lee
- Mabel Moore - Mildred Barton, The Wife
- Doris Kelcey - The Little Girl
- Kenneth Kelcey - The Little Boy
- Eleanor Blanchard - Madame Mantele
- Dorothy Phillips - The Model
- Dolores Cassinelli - Mrs. Landor's Maid
- Howard Missimer -
- Whitney Raymond -
- John Steppling -
- William Walters -

== Reception ==
Moving Picture World gave the film a positive review, saying "This slight plot is developed with a great deal of significance and humanity and makes a very pleasing picture."

== See also ==
- Francis X. Bushman filmography
