= Richard Foster Baker =

American film director

- Born: 25 January 1857
- Died: 21 February 1921 (aged 64)
- Occupation: Film director
- Years active: 1915–1921

Richard Foster Baker (January 25, 1857 - February 21, 1921) was a director and actor in the U.S. during the silent movie era.

Richard Foster Baker was born January 25, 1857, in Detroit, Wayne, Michigan, USA. He died February 21, 1921, in Chicago, Illinois, USA.

== Selected filmography ==
- The Rosary (1911)
- Her Dad the Constable (1911)
- God's Inn by the Sea (1911)
- The Gordian Knot (1911)
- Fate's Funny Frolic (1911)
- The Burglarized Burglar (1911)
- Lost Years (1911)
- The Fable of the Roistering Blades (1915)
- The Fable of Elvira and Farina and the Meal Ticket (1915)
- Sweedie Goes to College (1915)
- On Trial (1917)
- Kidder & Ko (1918)
