= Daydream of a Photoplay Artist =

- Starring: Francis X. Bushman
- Production company: Essanay Film Manufacturing Company
- Distributed by: General Film Company
- Release date: 1912
- Running time: short
- Country: USA
- Language: Silent..English titles

Daydream of a Photoplay Artist is a 1912 silent film dramatic short starring Francis X. Bushman. It was produced by the Essanay Film Manufacturing Company and distributed through General Film Company.

== Cast ==
- Francis X. Bushman

== See also ==
- Francis X. Bushman filmography
