= Alias Billy Sargent =

1912 silent short film

- Starring: Francis X. Bushman
- Production company: Essanay Studios
- Distributed by: General Film Company
- Release date: January 25, 1912
- Running time: 1 reel
- Country: USA
- Language: Silent..English titles

Alias Billy Sargent is a 1912 silent dramatic short film produced by the Essanay Studios and starring Francis X. Bushman. It was distributed by the General Film Company.

== Plot ==
John Steele is a wholesale jeweler and is visited in his office by diamond broker, Mr. William Sargent. After examining Steele's stock of diamonds, Sargent says he will consider the purchase and make an appointment with him later. Later that night, Sargent phones Steele's home and leaves a message with his wife to have her husband meet him at the Arms Hotel at 8 o'clock. Steele has tickets to the opera, but she forgets to give him the message until after they leave the theater. Her husband is upset until Mrs. Steele hires detectives to trail Sargent and they learn a week later that the "diamond broker" has been arrested for jewel robbery. Steele now realizes that his wife, inadvertently, saved him from financial ruin.

== Cast ==
- Francis X. Bushman - Mr. Weston
- Lily Branscombe - Mrs. Weston
- Frank Dayton - Sargent
- Evelyn Coates - The Child
- Bryant Washburn - Hotel Clerk

== See also ==
- Francis X. Bushman filmography
