= Twenty-One (1918 film) =

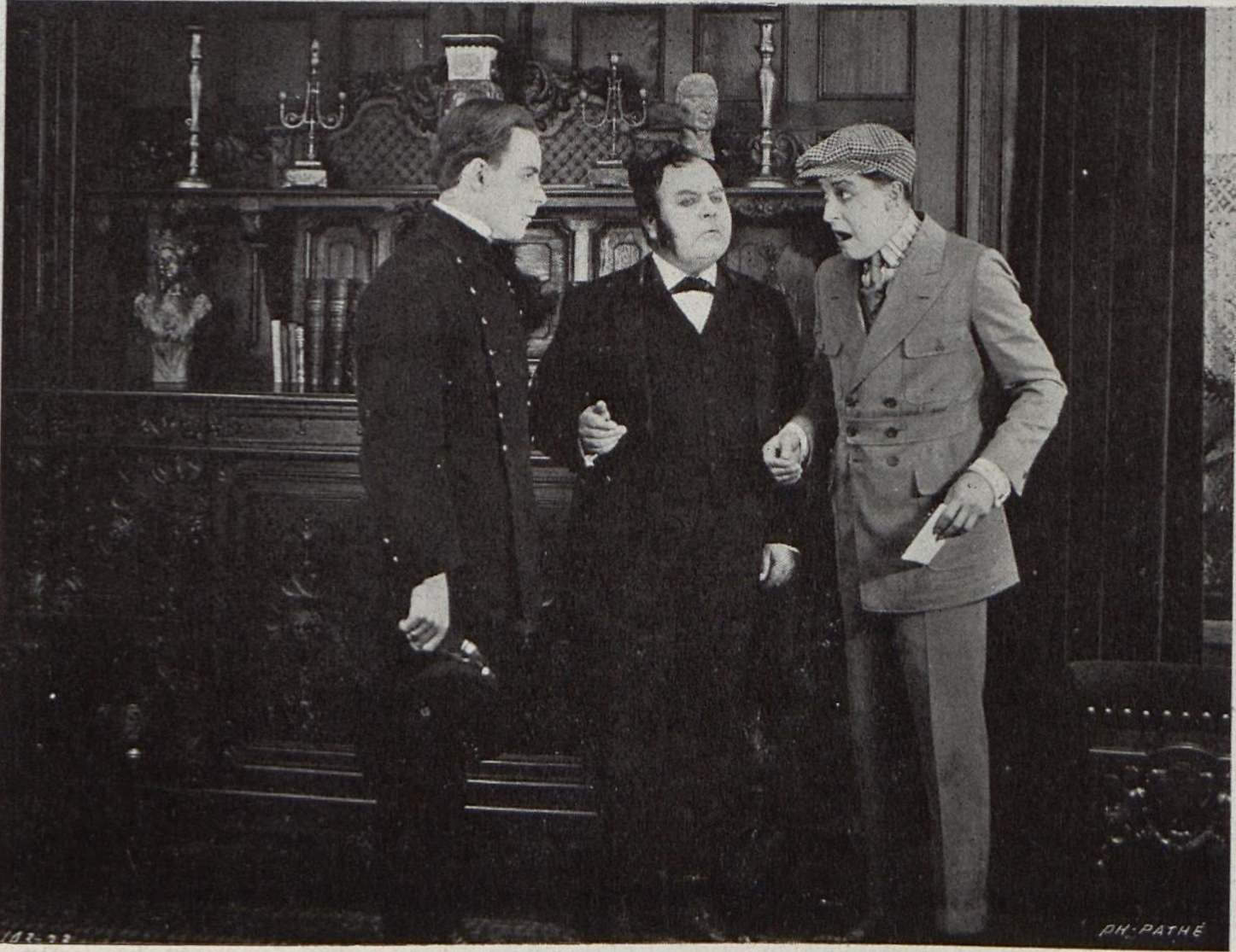
- Scene from Twenty-One
- Directed by: William Worthington
- Written by: George Randolph Chester (story)
- Starring: Bryant Washburn; Gertrude Selby
- Production company: Anderson-Brunton Co.
- Distributed by: Pathé Exchange
- Release date: April 7, 1918
- Country: United States
- Language: Silent (English intertitles)

Twenty-One is a 1918 American comedy drama silent film presumed lost. It was directed by William Worthington and starred Bryant Washburn and Gertrude Selby.

Washburn and Selby starred together again in Kidder & Ko.

== Plot ==
As described by the film's copyright description, Jimmy is mollycoddled and dictated to by his uncle, aunt, and valet. Only Maggie Curtis, the pretty maid, takes his part. Then he reaches the age of twenty-one and comes into his late father's fortune. Maggie suggests rebellion. Jimmy rebels. The young man proudly cashes a check for a thousand dollars and starts forth to seek adventure.

Fate, assisted by a pet dog, causes the tennis ball of pretty Dixie Taylor to roll through a hole in the hedge which shields the court from the eyes of curious pedestrians. Jimmy returns the ball and is progressing nicely until Dixie's big brother, Joe arrives on the scene, Jimmy flees. Later Jimmy drifts into a sporting club where boxing bouts are in progress. To his amazement one of the boxers in a preliminary contest, is his double. Jimmy slips into Dave Carey's dressing room and offers the pugilist $100 to swap clothes and homes with him for twenty-four hours.

Jimmy, through contact with Dave's trainers, learns that he possesses a knockout punch. He no longer fears Dixie's brother. So he goes to call on her. Meanwhile, Dave Carey has rescued Dixie from her runaway horse while she was riding with her brother. Dave also has fallen in love with Maggie, the maid, and brought about her discharge. He is caught kissing her by Jimmy's amazed and indignant aunt. Dixie, returning to her home in a taxi-cab, after her rescue runs down Maggie. The girl is not badly injured but Dixie insists on taking her to her destination, a boarding house behind the sport club, which has been recommended by Dave.

Jimmy is a little surprised at the warmth of his reception when he calls on Dixie. Joe rushes toward him to thank him for saving his sister's life, but Jimmy thinks Joe is attacking him. He knocks Joe out. Jimmy goes to the sport club that evening to re-exchange clothes with Dave who is to meet a near champion, named Sullivan. But Dave is attacked by thugs and prevented from coming. Jimmy takes his place in the ring and knocks out Sullivan. Dave arrives on the scene at the moment of Jimmy's triumph.

At a signal from Jimmy, Dave slips to the dressing room where each dons his own clothes. Dixie is worried about Maggie. She goes to the boarding house to see the injured girl. The young women are attacked by ruffians, Jimmy and Dave dash to the rescue and rout the toughs. The girls fall into the arms of their rescuers and almost get the wrong husbands-to-be because of their strong resemblance. But Jimmy and Dave straighten that out.

== Cast ==
- Bryant Washburn - Jimmy Mufferton/'Battling' Dave Carey
- Gertrude Selby - Dixie Charlton

== Production ==
Filming began in mid-February at the Paralta Studios in Los Angeles, and had wrapped up by late March.

== Reception ==
Moving Picture World reviewer Robert C. McElravy gave the film a positive review despite there being "no longer any particular novelty in plots of this type, depicting the mixed identities of two individuals who look exactly alike."

Variety's review was also positive, praising the film for its production and Bryant Washburn's acting, also saying "It is not the story, but rather the handling that makes it worth while as a feature."

== See also ==
- List of boxing films
