= Harry Cashman =

American actor

Harry C. Cashman
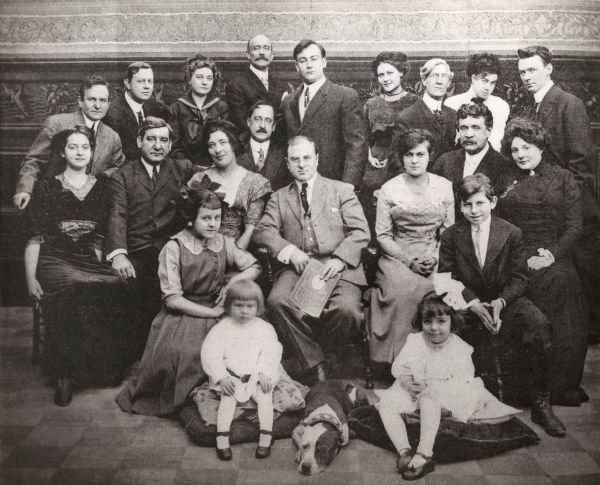
- Cashman seated left (with hand on Florence Hoffman's knee), Essanay Company, 1911
- Born: June 20, 1869; Cincinnati, Ohio, US
- Died: December 14, 1912 (aged 43); Chicago, Illinois, US
- Resting place: Graceland Cemetery, Chicago
- Occupation: Actor
- Years active: 1911–1912

Harry C. Cashman (June 20, 1869 – December 14, 1912) was an American stage and silent film actor. He was born in Ohio and died in Chicago, Illinois. He worked primarily for the Essanay Company of Chicago. He often costarred with Francis X. Bushman in Bushman's first couple of years in films. Cashman died of pneumonia.

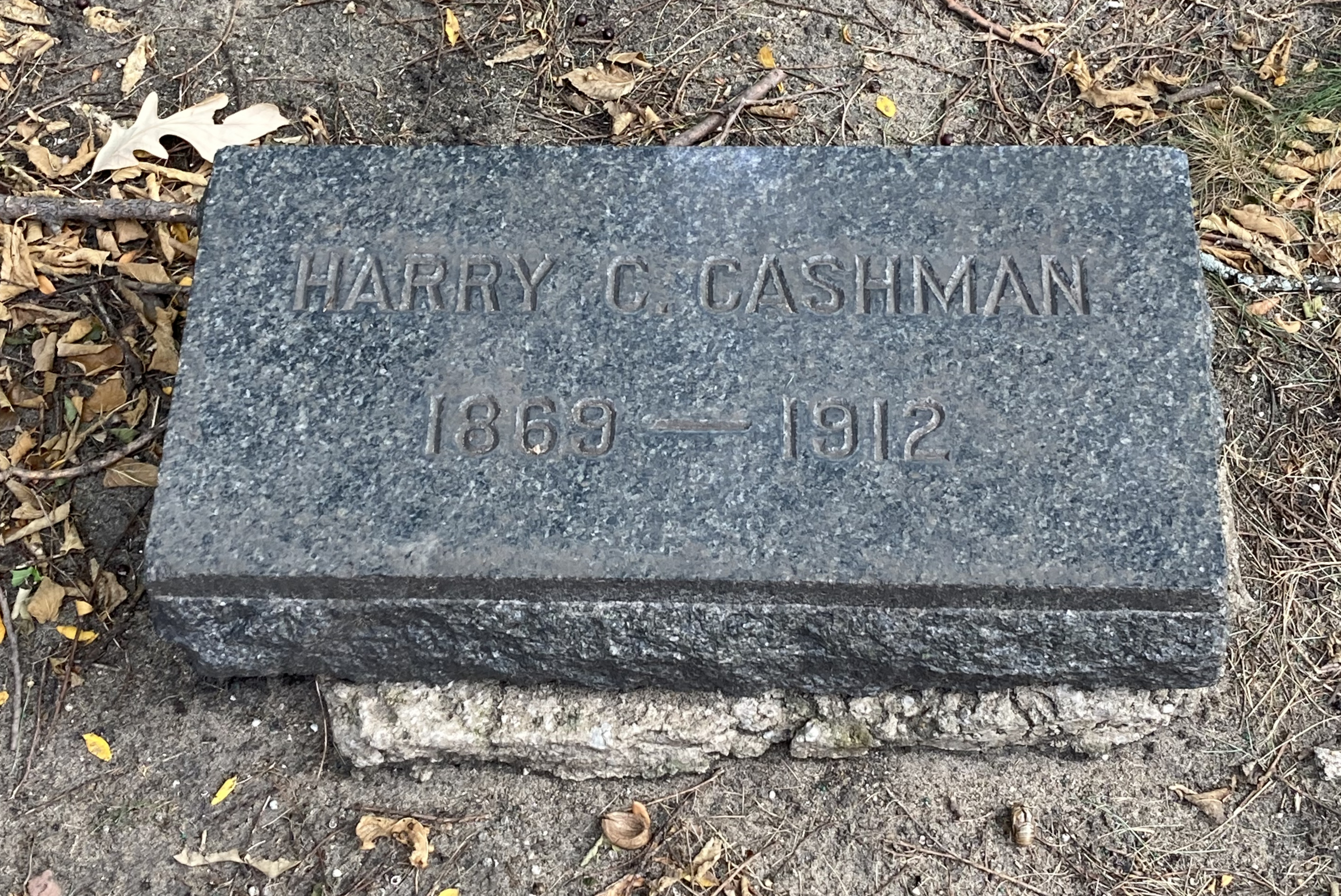
Cashman's grave

== Selected filmography ==
- Taming a Tyrant (1911)*short
- What Happened to Aunty (1911)*short
- The Laundry Lady's Luck (1911)*short
- She Got the Money (1911)*short
- Her Dad the Constable (1911)*short
- The Dark Romance of a Tobacco Tin (1911)*short
- The Burglarized Burglar (1911)*short
- Bill Bumper's Bargain (1911)*short
- He Fought for the U.S.A. (1911)*short
- The Madman (1911)*short
- The Long Strike (1911)*short
- The Goodfellow's Christmas Eve (1911)*short
- The Valley of Regrets (1912)*short
