= Her Dad the Constable =

1911 silent short film

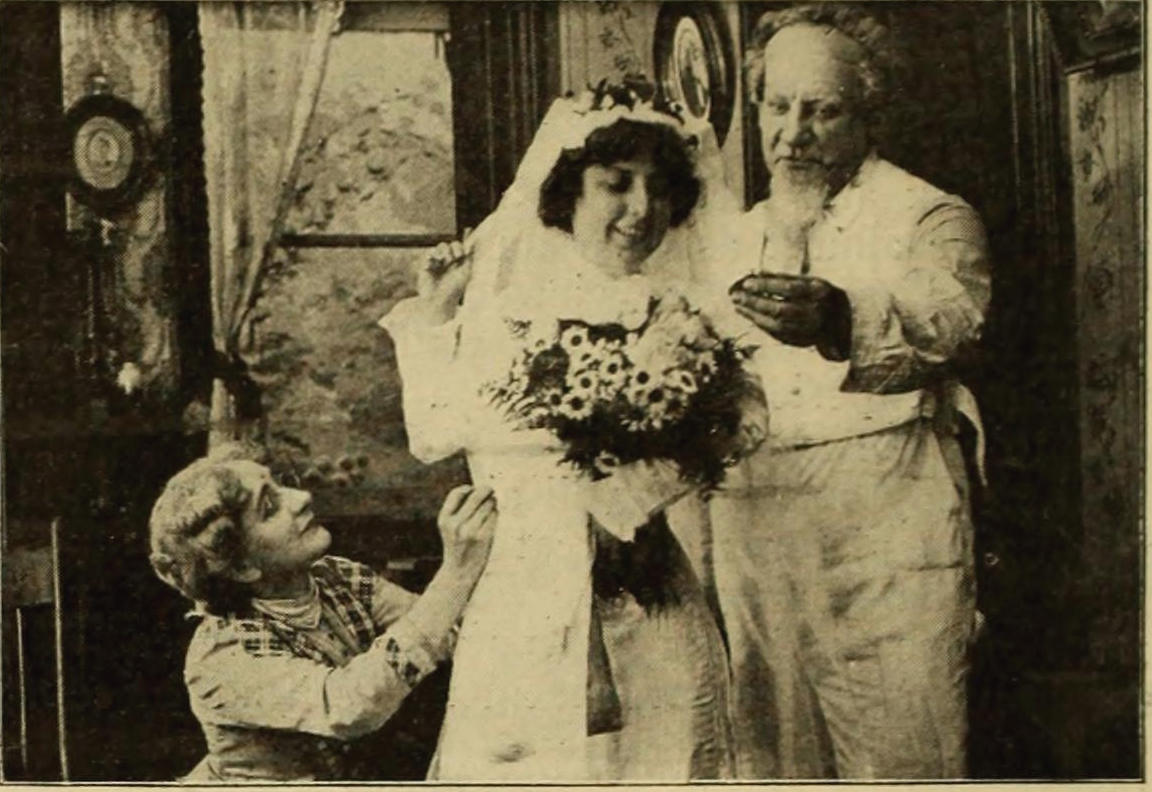
- Directed by: R. F. Baker (*Richard Foster Baker)
- Starring: Francis X. Bushman
- Production company: Essanay Studios
- Distributed by: General Film Company
- Release date: July 18, 1911
- Running time: 1 reel
- Country: USA
- Language: Silent ..English titles

Her Dad the Constable is a 1911 American silent comedy-romance short film directed by R. F. Baker (Richard Foster Baker) and starring Francis X. Bushman. Released as a split-reel with God's Inn by the Sea.

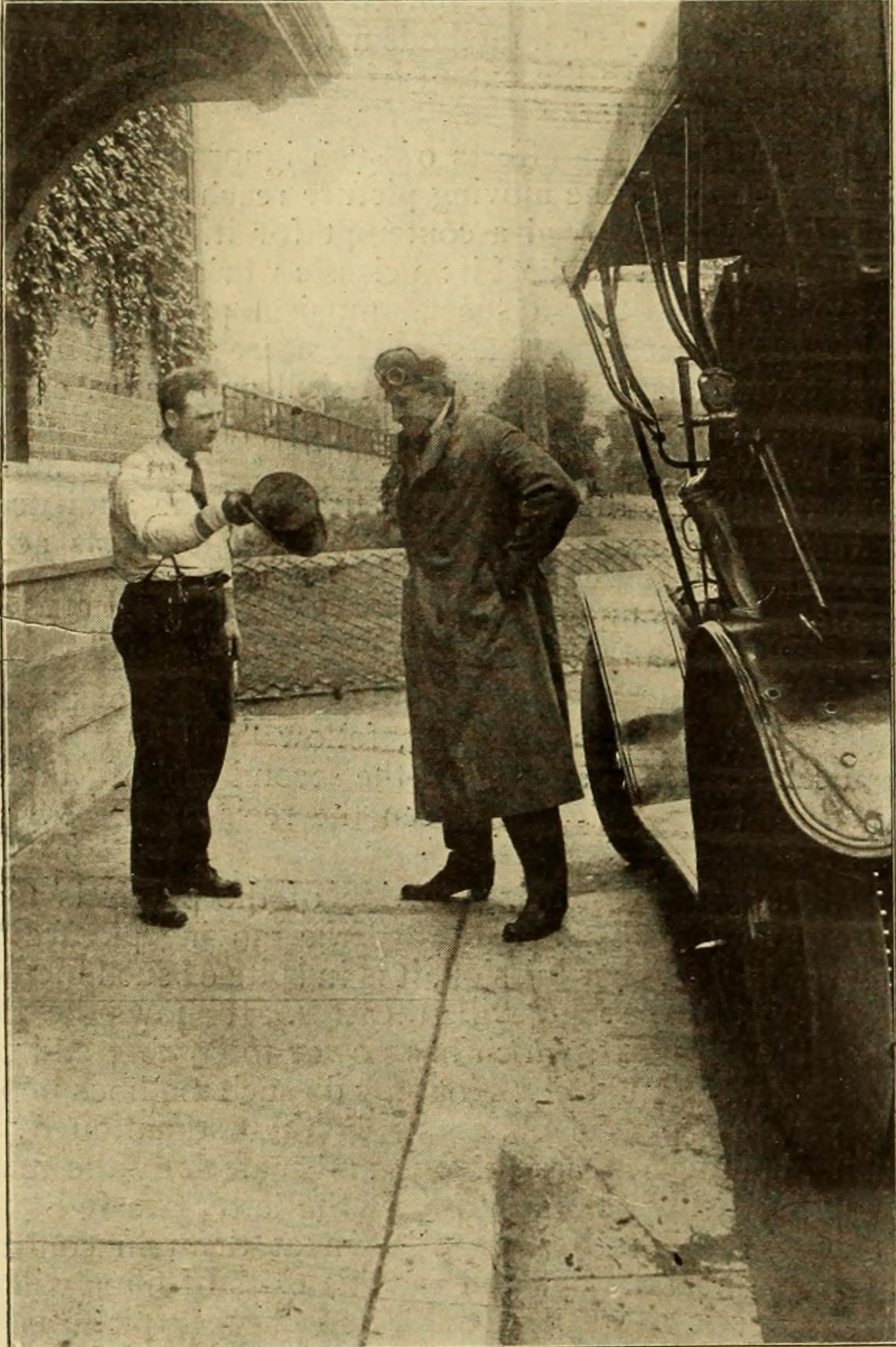
Publicity still

== Plot ==
According to a film magazine, "Mary Perkins, a country girl, goes to the city intending to visit friends. In endeavoring to find her way to her trend's home, she is lost and after wandering aimlessly about the streets is assisted by a young man, who is also acquainted with Mary's friends. Young Thornton soon fails in love with Mary and on the eve of her departure for home, proposes and is accepted. Mary writes to her father and mother, telling them of the engagement and that she and Tom will be married at the country home within a week. On the wedding day Tom misses his train and decides to drive out to Mary's home in his motor alone. On the way be is delayed several times by accidents and urging his car to its utmost speed, sails like a streak through the country towns, paying no attention to the various village constables who try to arrest him for speeding. Perkins, Mary's father, is the constable of their village, and when the guests are anxiously awaiting the arrival of Tom, he receives a telephone message from another constable, that a speeder is coming his way. As a result Tom is arrested, while Perkins, who has never seen Tom before, refuses to listen to any explanation. Locking the young man up in the calaboose, Perkins hurriedly returns home, when it is learned that the young man he had arrested is his prospective son-in-law. The affair ends happily enough when Tom is released and the delayed ceremony takes place."

== Cast ==
- Francis X. Bushman as Tom Thornton
- Harry Cashman as The Constable
- Dorothy Phillips as Mary Perkins

== Reception ==
Moving Picture World's review was quite positive, praising the acting of the performers and calling the film "classy."

== See also ==
- Francis X. Bushman filmography
