= He Fought for the U.S.A. =

1911 silent short film

- Produced by: G. M. Anderson
- Starring: Francis X. Bushman
- Production company: Essanay Studios
- Distributed by: General Film Company
- Release date: November 7, 1911
- Running time: 1 reels
- Country: USA
- Language: Silent..English titles

He Fought for the U.S.A. is a 1911 American silent historical romantic drama short film produced by the Essanay Studios and starring Francis X. Bushman. It was distributed by the General Film Company.

== Plot ==
According to a contemporary film magazine, "The scene of this story is laid on a plantation of a wealthy Southerner in Virginia. Frank Langdon, a young Southerner, is in love with Virginia Randolph, while his brother Bob, is infatuated with Virginia's sister. War is declared between the North and South, and while Bob and his father are faithful to the South, Frank declares he will fight for the North. Branded a traitor by Virginia, Frank joins the Northern army. Later, made a Lieutenant, he meets his brother on the battle field, saves the latter's life, but pursues him with a squad of foot soldiers to the old Southern home, near which the engagement took place. Virginia hides Bob and when Frank enters she begs him to spare the younger brother. Frank finally consents to do so, but under the impression that Virginia loves Bob, writes his former sweetheart a note, in which he expresses his hope that she and Bob will be happy together. Not until after the war, when Frank returns, does he learn that Virginia has always loved him, while Bob has become engaged to Virginia's sister."

== Cast ==
- Francis X. Bushman - First Brother
- Bryant Washburn - Second Brother
- Harry Cashman - Major Langdon
- Frank Dayton - Colonel Randolph
- Lily Branscombe - Virginia Randolph

== See also ==
- Francis X. Bushman filmography
