= The Mail Order Wife =

- Produced by: G. M. Anderson
- Starring: Francis X. Bushman; Bryant Washburn
- Production company: Essanay Studios
- Distributed by: General Film Company
- Release date: January 2, 1912
- Running time: 1 reel
- Country: USA
- Language: Silent..English titles

The Mail Order Wife is a 1912 silent film drama short produced by the Essanay Studios and starring Francis X. Bushman. It was distributed by the General Film Company.

== Cast ==
- Francis X. Bushman - Bob Strong
- Bryant Washburn - John White

== See also ==
- Francis X. Bushman filmography
