= The Dark Romance of a Tobacco Tin =

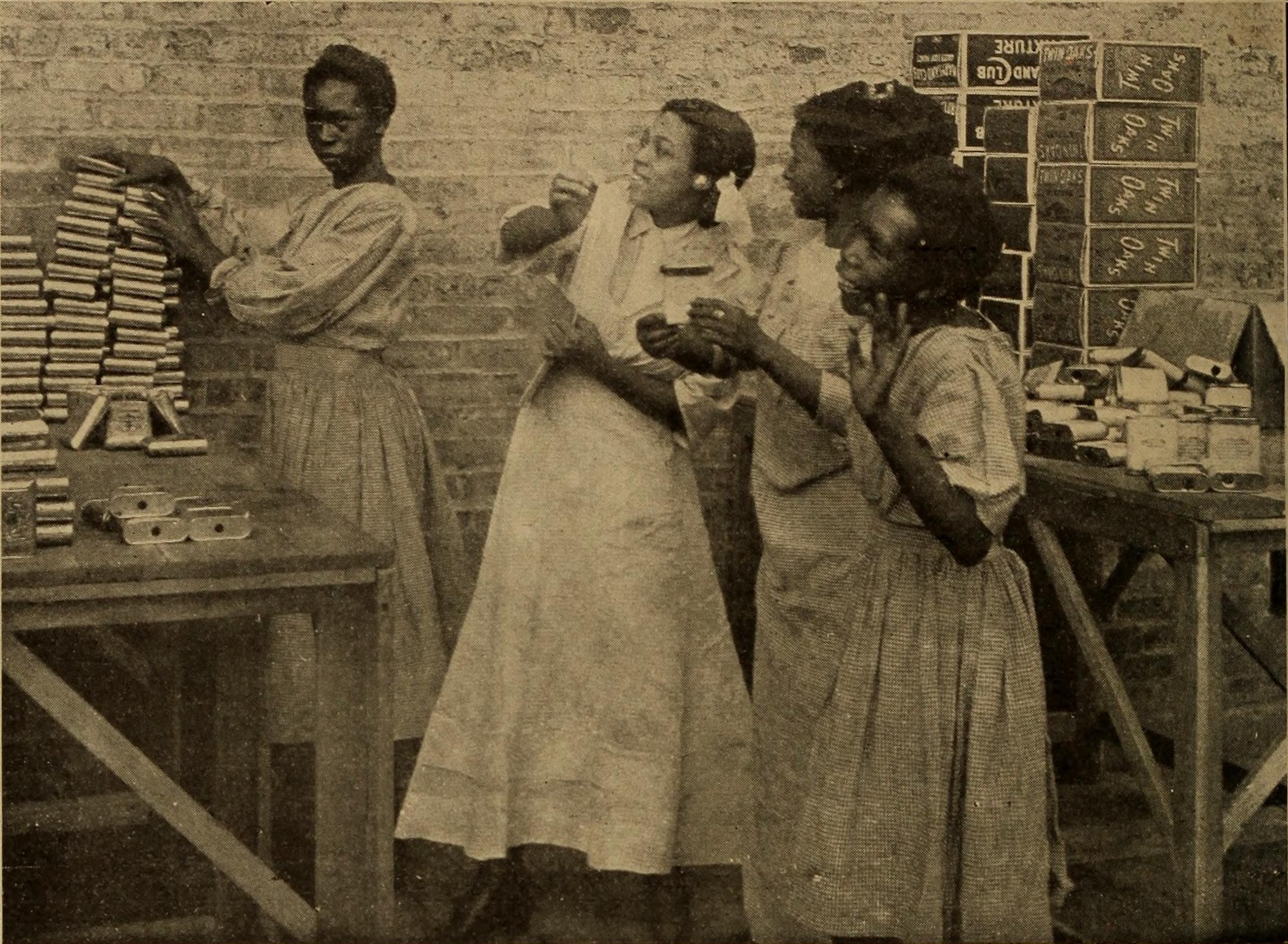
- Starring: Francis X. Bushman
- Production company: Essanay Studios
- Distributed by: General Film Company
- Release date: September 7, 1911
- Running time: short; 1 reel
- Country: USA
- Language: Silent (English intertitles)

The Dark Romance of a Tobacco Tin is a 1911 American silent short comedy film produced by the Essanay Studios of Chicago. It starred Francis X. Bushman with an early appearance by Bryant Washburn. The General Film Company distributed the picture.

== Plot ==
Grace Williams is a young black girl working in a tobacco factory, who slips a note with her name and address into a can, before it's sealed and sent out. Several years later, George M. Jackson buys up a can of tobacco as he leaves to read his uncle's will with his lawyer, Harvey Dickson. Inside, the will says that Jackson must marry within a week of his uncle's passing. Opening up the tin of tobacco to fill his pipe with, he reads the note left behind by Grace, and quickly writes a letter telling her to visit him. A week passes, and she finally arrives, but he tosses her out of the house in horror and despair. With time running out, he proposes to the maid and hurries off with her to the marriage license bureau, where they are married.

== Cast ==
- Francis X. Bushman - George M. Jackson
- Harry Cashman - Harvey Dickson
- Bryant Washburn - Telegraph Clerk

== See also ==
- Francis X. Bushman filmography
