= The Challenge (1922 film) =

1922 film

- Directed by: Tom Terriss
- Starring: Rod La Rocque; Dolores Cassinelli; Warner Richmond
- Cinematography: Harold S. Sintzenich
- Production company: Star Productions
- Distributed by: American Releasing Corporation
- Release date: November 26, 1922
- Running time: 50 minutes
- Country: United States
- Language: Silent (English) intertitles

The Challenge is a 1922 American silent drama film directed by Tom Terriss and starring Rod La Rocque, Dolores Cassinelli and Warner Richmond.

== Cast ==
- Rod La Rocque as Stanley Roberts
- Dolores Cassinelli as Barbara Hastings
- Warner Richmond as Ralph Westley
- De Sacia Mooers as Peggy Royce
- Jane Jennings as Mrs. Hastings
- Frank Norcross as Mr. Hastings

== Bibliography ==
- Connelly, Robert B. The Silents: Silent Feature Films, 1910-36, Volume 40, Issue 2. December Press, 1998.
- Munden, Kenneth White. The American Film Institute Catalog of Motion Pictures Produced in the United States, Part 1. University of California Press, 1997.
