= The Power of Conscience =

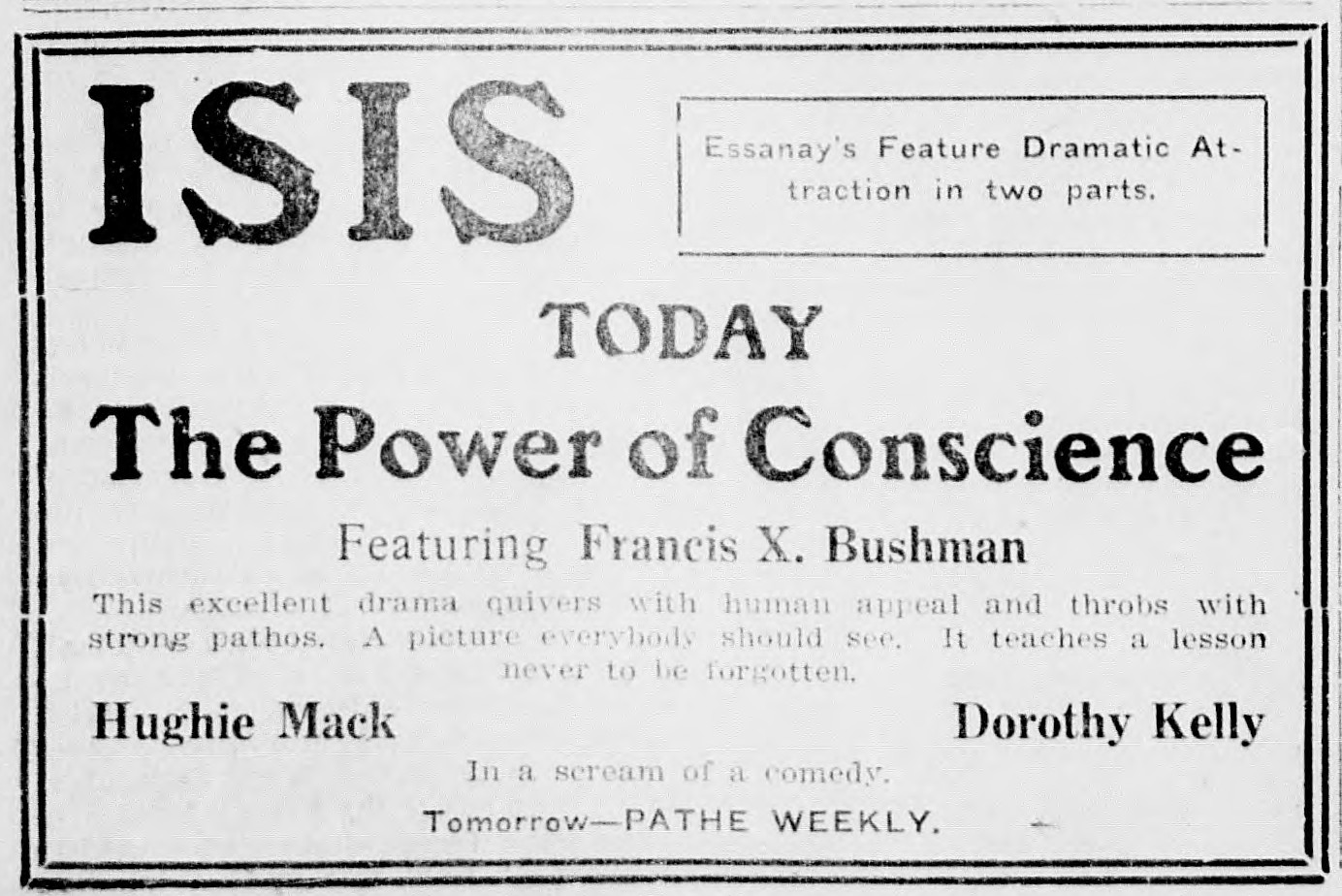
- Newspaper advertisement
- Directed by: Theodore Wharton
- Produced by: Essanay Film
- Starring: Francis X. Bushman; Dorothy Phillips; Bryant Washburn
- Distributed by: General Film Company
- Release date: August 22, 1913
- Running time: two reels
- Country: United States
- Language: Silent..English

The Power of Conscience is a 1913 silent film short film directed by Theodore Wharton and starring Francis X. Bushman. It was produced by the Essanay Film Company and distributed through General Film Company.

== Cast ==
- Francis X. Bushman - Reverend Stanley Waters
- Dorothy Phillips - Dora Gordon
- Bryant Washburn - Byron Waters
- Frank Dayton - Farmer Gordon
- E. H. Calvert - Edward Hale
- Helen Dunbar - Mrs. Waters
- William Bailey - uncredited
- Beverly Bayne - uncredited
- Otto Breslin - uncredited
