= Easy to Make Money =

1919 silent film directed by Edwin Carewe

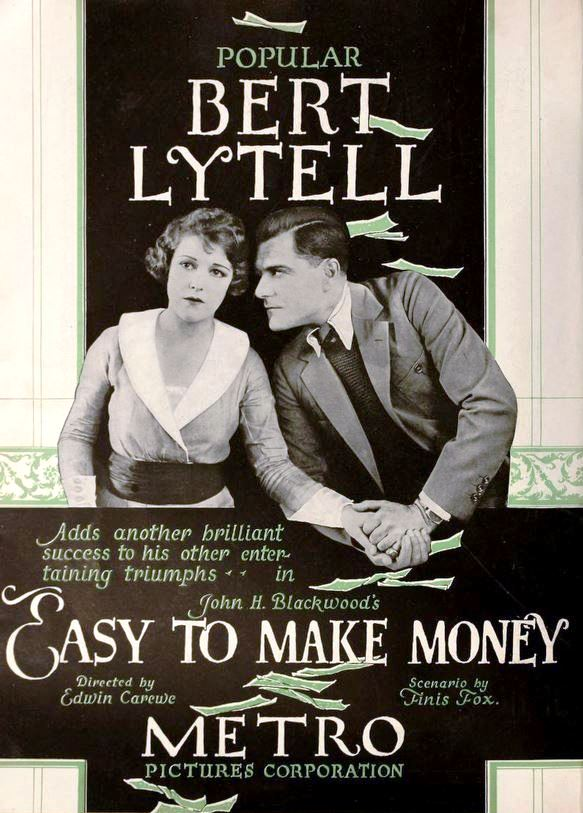
- Advertisement in Motion Picture News
- Directed by: Edwin Carewe
- Screenplay by: Finis Fox (Scenario)
- Story by: John H. Blackwood
- Produced by: B. A. Rolfe
- Starring: Bert Lytell; Gertrude Selby; Frank Currier
- Cinematography: Robert B. Kurrle
- Production company: Metro Pictures
- Release date: August 4, 1919 (US)
- Running time: 5 reels
- Country: United States
- Language: Silent (English intertitles)

Easy to Make Money, originally titled It's Easy to Make Money is a 1919 American silent comedy film directed by Edwin Carewe. It stars Bert Lytell, Gertrude Selby, and Frank Currier, and was released on August 4, 1919.

== Plot ==
James Frederick Slocum Sr. is disappointed in his son, James Jr., who has repeated run-ins with the law, particularly as it concerns his speeding while driving. He bets his son $25,000 that the son cannot go a full year without being arrested more than once. The son accepts the bet, then hatches a scheme to win it wherein he will get arrested and jailed for the entire year period, thus making it impossible for him to be arrested more than once. To accomplish this, he stages a fight in a bar, during which he demolishes the interior. After his arrest, the judge only sentences him to six months behind bars, so James Jr. insults him, resulting in the judge adding six months for contempt of court. While in jail, he befriends a bank robber, Charles Miller.

After his release from jail, he is traveling cross-country when he gets stranded in a small town. He becomes besotted with a local innkeeper, Gertrude Shelby, whose inn is failing. He takes over management of the inn, and utilizing the water from a spring on the property, turns the inn into a successful operation. However, Katherine Fowler, the daughter of the local banker, Henry Fowler, has also taken an interest in James Jr., and is jealous of the success of Ethel's inn. She gets her father to foreclose on the inn. Using the $25,000 he won from his father, James Jr. opens his own bank and saves the day. When James Sr. arrives in town, he is quite pleased with the progress his son has made and blesses his marriage to Ethel.

== Cast ==
- Bert Lytell as James Frederick Slocum Jr.
- Gertrude Selby as Ethel Wheeler
- Frank Currier as James Frederick Slocum Sr.
- Stanton Heck as Henry Fowler
- Ethel Shannon as Katherine Fowler
- Edward J. Connelly as Jasper Kennedy
- Bull Montana as Charles Miller, aka "Kid"
- Hal Wilson

== Production ==
In early May 1919, it was announced that Lytell's next picture would be a film written by John H. Blackwood, entitled, Easy to Make Money, Maxwell Karger having purchased the rights to Blackwood's story for Metro. Later in May it was revealed that Edwin Carewe would be the director. Principal photography on the film began on May 12, with the working title, It's Easy to Make Money. In June 1919, Bert Lytell confirmed that his next film would be Easy to Make Money. That same month it was announced that Metro had begun production on the film. The complete interior fixtures, furniture and equipment of a famous Chicago landmark, the Au Revoir Bar, were relocated to Hollywood, so that they could be reconstructed, after which they were totally destroyed by Lytell during the filming of the picture. Filming on the picture was completed on June 8. In early July, Metro announced the film was scheduled for release on August 4, and that was the day of its general release, although it had a world premiere at the New York Theater in New York City on August 3. The picture marked the film debut of Ethel Shannon.

== Reception ==
The Hartford Courant gave the film a favorable review, saying Lytell's performance in the film, "shows him in one of those light comedy roles in which he invariably shows himself as one of the accomplished of comedy stars. The Altoona Tribune also enjoyed the picture, stating that it was "the best vehicle Mr. Lytell has had for some time". They felt, "It is the way he [Lytell] goes about it, the manner in which he accomplishes his tricks, the intensely humorous situations which result from his actions, the inimitable refreshing personality of Lytell and the ingenious bits of business which he does that make 'Easy to Make Money' a meritorious picture." Variety, on the other hand, was less kind to the movie, saying it "isn't a bad little feature, though its five parts are full of riduculous assumptions." They did not compliment Finis Fox' scenario, and called Robert Kurrle's photography merely average.

== Preservation ==
With no prints of Easy to Make Money located in any film archives, it is considered a lost film.
