= The Madman (film) =

- Produced by: Essanay Studios; G. M. Anderson
- Starring: Francis X. Bushman
- Distributed by: General Film Company
- Release date: December 5, 1911
- Running time: 1 reel
- Country: United States
- Language: Silent (English intertitles)

The Madman is a 1911 silent film short produced by the Essanay Studios and distributed by the General Film Company. The film is preserved in the BFI National Archive. It revolves around a man in a mental institution.

== Cast ==
- Francis X. Bushman as The Madman
- Harry Cashman as The Warden
- Frank Dayton as The Butler
- Charles Hitchcock as an Official
- William Walters as The Guard
- Bryant Washburn as A Balloonist
