= Gertrude Selby =

American actress

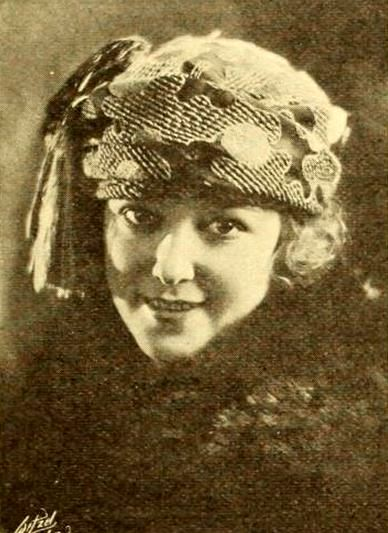
- Selby in March 1919
- Born: Gertrude Olga Selby; November 7, 1894; Philadelphia, Pennsylvania, U.S.
- Died: June 22, 1975 (aged 80); Los Angeles, California, U.S.
- Occupation: Actress
- Spouse: Townsend Netcher (div.)

Gertrude Selby was an American actress who was active in Hollywood in the silent era. She appeared in dozens of films between 1914 and 1920, mostly short comedies.

== Early life and education ==
Gertrude was born in Philadelphia to William Selby and Olga Hansen, and she was educated in New York City.

== Career ==
She began her career as a vaudevillian before breaking into the nascent motion picture industry around 1914, working frequently on L-KO comedies.

In 1919, at age 24, she married wealthy Chicago socialite Townsend Netcher in Beverly Hills, California after a three-week courtship, against the wishes of Necher's family. The couple divorced in the late 1920s, with Selby filing on the grounds of cruelty. Netcher later married actress Constance Talmadge.

Selby appears to have retired from acting around the time she married Netcher, and spent several years post-divorce living in Spain with her mother and sister. The three were evacuated from their apartment in Barcelona at the start of the Spanish Civil War.

Selby then spent time in a penthouse in Paris before returning to the United States in the early 1940s at the outbreak of World War II. She does not appear to have ever remarried.

== Select filmography ==
- Easy to Make Money (1919)
- Kidder & Ko (1918)
- Twenty-One (1918)
- The Double Room Mystery (1917)
- A Child of Mystery (1916)
- The Sign of the Poppy (1916)
