= Dolores Cassinelli =

American actress and singer (1888–1984)

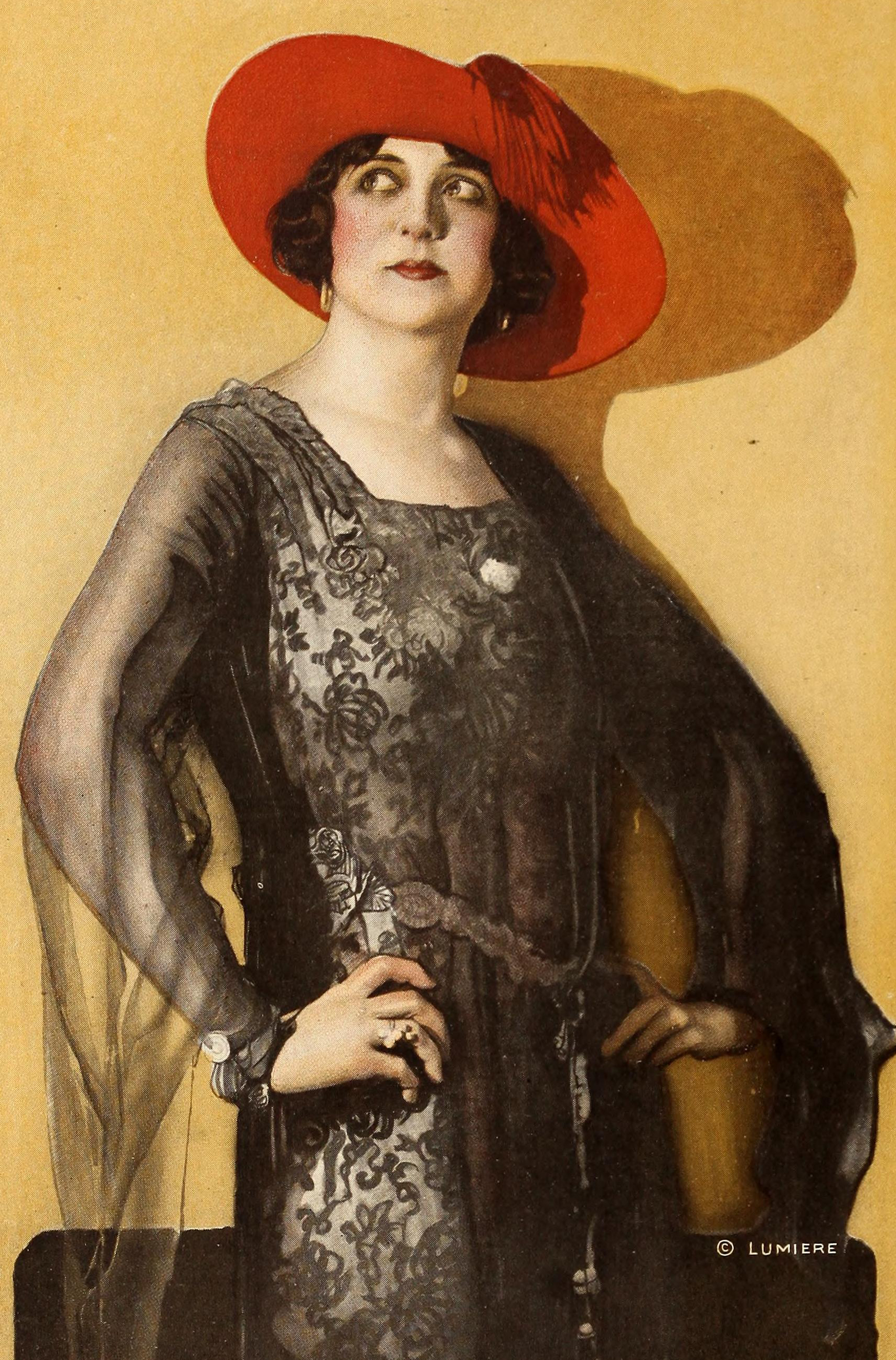
- Cassinelli, 1919
- Born: Elvere Dolores Cassinelli; July 4, 1888; New York City, U.S.
- Died: April 26, 1984 (aged 95); New Brunswick, New Jersey, U.S.
- Occupations: Actress, singer
- Years active: 1911–1925

Dolores Cassinelli (July 4, 1888 – April 26, 1984) was an American film actress and singer. She appeared in 69 films between 1911 and 1925.

Born in New York City, Cassinelli and her family moved to Chicago. Her parents put her in a convent with plans for her to become a nun, but she preferred to become an actress.

By 1929, Cassinelli had left acting and turned to singing professionally. She said that she would return to films only if she could make a singing film, "for radio is my life now".

She is interred at Holy Redeemer Cemetery in South Plainfield, New Jersey.

== Selected filmography ==
- A False Suspicion (1911)
- From the Submerged (1912) *short
- When Soul Meets Soul (1913) *short
- Lafayette, We Come (1918)
- The Virtuous Model (1919)
- Tarnished Reputations (1920)
- The Web of Deceit (1920)
- Forever (1921)
- Anne of Little Smoky (1921)
- The Hidden Light (1921)
- The Secrets of Paris (1922)
- The Challenge (1922)
- Columbus (1923) - Queen Isabella
- Jamestown (1923) - Pocahontas
- Dangerous Money (1924)
- Lend Me Your Husband (1924)
- The Unguarded Hour (1925)
- The Midnight Girl (1925)
