= Lafayette, We Come =

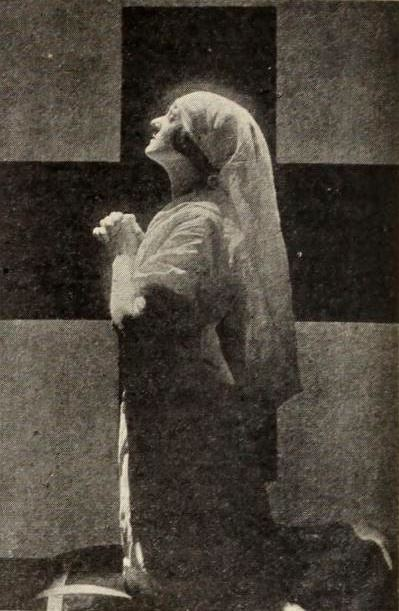
- Directed by: Léonce Perret
- Written by: Léonce Perret
- Produced by: Léonce Perret
- Starring: E. K. Lincoln; Dolores Cassinelli
- Cinematography: Alfred Ortlieb
- Distributed by: Affiliated Distributors' Corporation; Mutual Film
- Release date: November 17, 1918
- Running time: 6 reeks
- Country: USA

Lafayette, We Come is a lost 1918 silent World War I propaganda film produced and directed by Léonce Perret and starred E. K. Lincoln and Dolores Cassinelli.

== Cast ==
- E. K. Lincoln - Leroy Trenchard
- Dolores Cassinelli - Therese Verneuil
- Emmett King - Mr. Trenchard
- Ethel Winthrop - Mrs. Trenchard
- Ernest Maupain - The Marquis
- Valentine Petit - The Marquise
- Marcel Duchamp - Wounded Man

themselves

- Ferdinand Foch
- John J. Pershing
- Woodrow Wilson
- Douglas Haig
