= The Double Room Mystery =

- Directed by: Hobart Henley
- Written by: Elliott J. Clawson; Stella Wynne Herron
- Starring: Gertrude Selby; Hayward Mack; Ed Brady
- Cinematography: Stephen S. Norton
- Production company: Red Feather Photoplays
- Distributed by: Universal Pictures
- Release date: January 15, 1917
- Running time: 50 minutes
- Country: United States
- Languages: Silent; English intertitles

The Double Room Mystery is a 1917 American silent thriller film directed by Hobart Henley and starring Gertrude Selby, Hayward Mack and Ed Brady.

== Cast ==
- Gertrude Selby as Suzanne - a Slavey
- Hayward Mack as Speed Cannon
- Ed Brady as Bill Greely
- Edward Hearn as Silver Joe
- Ernest Shields as James
- Mattie Witting as Mrs. Wiggins
- Harry Mann as Dago Low

== Bibliography ==
- Robert B. Connelly. The Silents: Silent Feature Films, 1910-36, Volume 40, Issue 2. December Press, 1998.
