= Lost Years (film) =

1911 film by Richard Foster Baker

- Directed by: Richard Foster Baker
- Produced by: Essanay Studios; Theodore Wharton
- Starring: Francis X. Bushman
- Distributed by: General Film Company
- Release date: September 26, 1911
- Running time: 1 reel
- Country: USA
- Languages: Silent, English intertitles

Lost Years is a 1911 silent film dramatic short directed by Richard Foster Baker and starring Francis X. Bushman. It was produced by the Essanay Studios and released by the General Film Company.

== Cast ==
- Francis X. Bushman - James Brown
