= The Snare (1912 film) =

- Directed by: Theodore Wharton
- Produced by: Essanay Studios
- Starring: Beverly Bayne; William Bailey
- Distributed by: General Film Company
- Release date: October 17, 1912
- Running time: 1-reel
- Country: USA
- Language: Silent..English titles

The Snare is a 1912 silent film short directed by Theodore Wharton and starring Beverly Bayne, William Bailey and Lily Branscombe. It was produced by Essanay Studios and distributed through General Film Company.

== Cast ==
- William Bailey - Tom Ransom
- Lily Branscombe - Mrs. Ransom, Tom's Mother
- Beverly Bayne - Mary Clement, Detective
- Frank Dayton - Police Chief
- E. H. Calvert - Detective
- Charles Hitchcock - Detective
- Billy Mason - Detective (*William Mason)
- Howard Missimer - Telegraph Operator
- Whitney Raymond - Boy in Detective Office
