= Live, Love and Believe =

- Produced by: G. M. Anderson
- Starring: Francis X. Bushman
- Production company: Essanay Studios
- Distributed by: General Film Company
- Release date: August 18, 1911
- Running time: 1 reel
- Country: USA
- Language: Silent..English titles

Live, Love and Believe is a 1911 American silent short drama film produced by the Essanay Studios and released through the General Film Company. The film starred Francis X. Bushman and Dorothy Phillips. It was released in split-reel form with Saved from the Torrents.

== Plot ==
According to a contemporary description by Moving Picture World, the film follows

"Ainsworth, a young man who has fallen through drink and is drifting about in the slums of the city, is influenced to mend his ways by the influence of Dorothy Chalmers, a mission worker. Through her good influence he becomes a man, but finding that he has fallen in love with her and knowing he can never be her equal, socially, he leaves the settlement, after penning her a line, thanking her for the good she has done for him and informing her of his intentions of joining the army. After several years of service in the army and mainly through his sobriety and integrity, he is prompted to second lieutenant. At a military ball Lieutenant Ainsworth meets Colonel Chalmers, the father of Dorothy and learns that she is at the ball. He seeks her out and in good time, for Dorothy has been approached by another admirer, whose ardent wooing which is not returned, soon turns to violence, Lieutenant Ainsworth sends the man away and then learns that it is his old friend of the mission he has defended. All the pent up emotions of the past years swell up in his bosom and he tells her of his love. Needless to say, the girl who has always loved him goes to his arms, when they are found by Colonel Chalmers, who congratulates them."

== Cast ==
- Francis X. Bushman as Harry Ainsworth
- Dorothy Phillips as Dorothy Chalmers

== See also ==
- Francis X. Bushman filmography
