= The Gordian Knot (film) =

The Gordion Knot
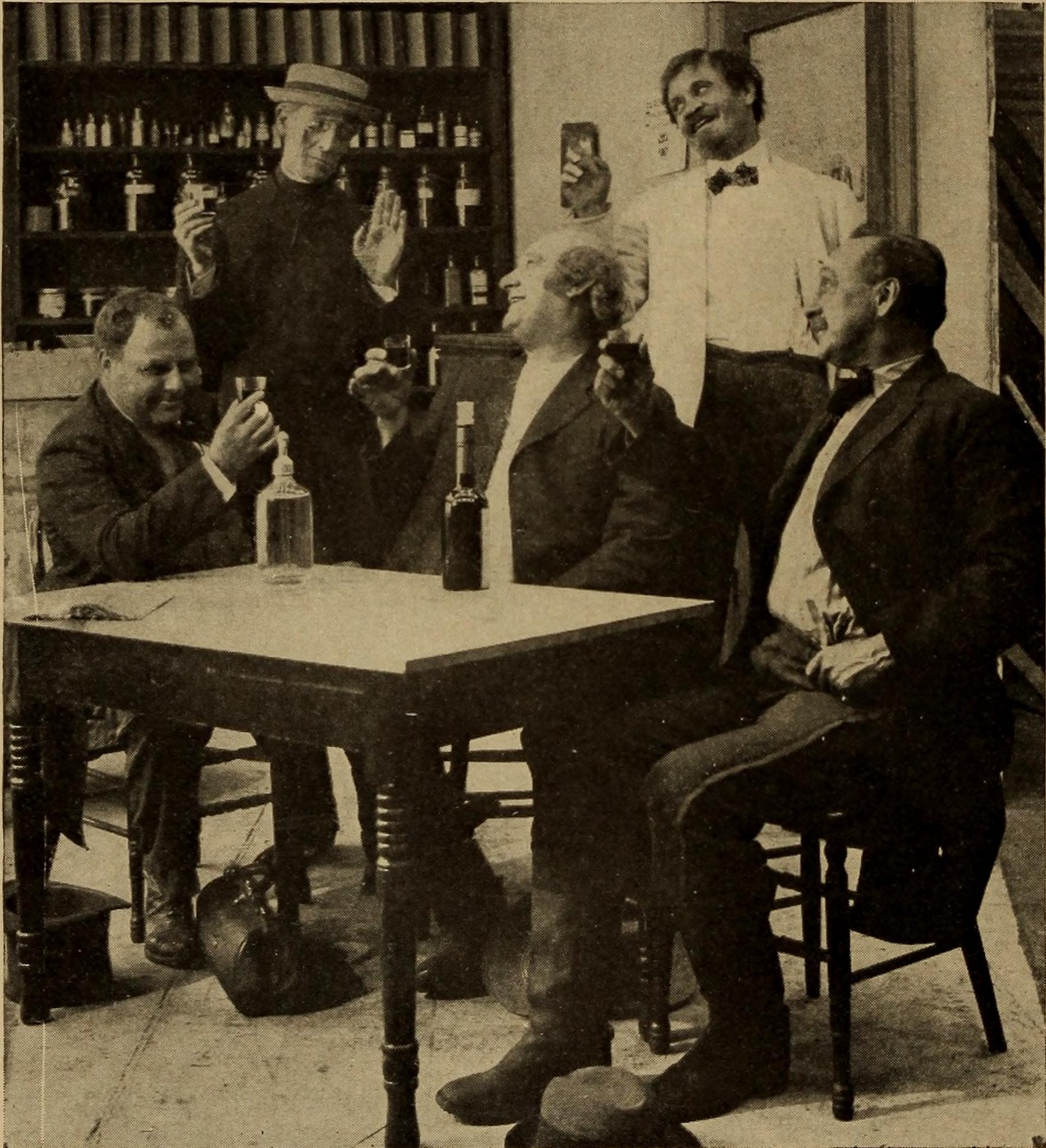
- Directed by: R. F. Baker (*Richard Foster Baker)
- Starring: Francis X. Bushman
- Production company: Essanay Studios
- Distributed by: General Film Company
- Release date: August 11, 1911
- Running time: 1 reel
- Country: USA
- Language: Silent..English titles

The Gordian Knot is a 1911 American silent romantic comedy film directed by R. F. Baker (*Richard Foster Baker) and produced by the Essanay Studios. It starred Francis X. Bushman and was distributed by the General Film Company.

== Plot ==
According to a film magazine, "Marion Walters and Harry Robbins are in love. Robbins is a promising young contractor and has the esteem of Marion's father, a shrewd old fellow who wants to see the young people happy and see Marion married before he dies. The happy prospects are quashed, however, when Elizabeth, Marion's older sister, elopes with a young man of the village, leaving a note stating that she feels Marion will surely not care to marry as long as her father is alive, whereat Marion breaks off her engagement with Harry, despite his pleas and her father's endeavor to change her mind. A plan is finally concocted in the dark room of the drugstore, with Doctor Finney's assistance. Walters has driven into town with Marion and has persuaded her to go driving with Harry. After they are out of sight, the old man is carried out of the drugstore, helped into a buggy and driven home by the doctor, while the news is spread that Walters is dying. The young couple are sent for and arrive home, where Marion finds her father apparently gasping out his last breath, in which he asks her to marry Harry immediately. A preacher is there and the ceremony is conducted, after which the old man springs to his feet and tells them of his conspiracy. Marion's wrath is soon appeased and the happy couple are congratulated by all present."

== Cast ==
- Francis X. Bushman - Harry Robbins
- Dorothy Phillips - Marion Walters
