= The Rosary (1911 film) =

1911 film

- Directed by: R. F. Baker (*Richard Foster Baker)
- Starring: Francis X. Bushman; Dorothy Phillips
- Production company: Essanay Film Manufacturing Company
- Distributed by: General Film Company
- Release date: July 14, 1911
- Running time: 1 reel
- Country: USA
- Language: Silent..English titles

The Rosary (also The Two Devotions) is a 1911 American silent romantic drama short film directed by R.F. Baker aka Richard Foster Baker and starring Francis X. Bushman. It was produced by the Essanay Film Manufacturing Company and distributed by the General Film Company.

== Plot ==
According to a film magazine, "Mrs. Payne, an invalid, is propped up in bed with her little son kneeling beside her when there is a knock at the door, and the priest, Father Grant, enters. Realizing that the woman is beyond physical aid, the old priest goes through the last rites of the church and the invalid mother falls back dead. Feeling a great love for the little fellow, Father Grant resolves to adopt him and when he consents, leads him away to his home. Ten years later the boy has resolved to become a priest and has already taken the preliminary steps. One day he is sent by Father Grant to the home of an old friend, where he meets Ruth Martin, a beautiful and innocent young girl. This first meeting results in the mutual love of both, although each hardly realize what it means to them. A few months later finds the young man where he must foreswear the church or the girl, and with aching heart young Payne resolves to sacrifice his sweetheart for the priesthood. Alone that night his heart is filled with bitter regret, as he realizes he has lost Ruth forever. Tempted to see her once more, and if possible to persuade Father Grant to release him from his vows, he steals back to the girl's cottage that night, and tells her of his love. It is she who awakens him to the folly of the step, and she tells him she will be glad to sacrifice all worldly pleasures if he will return to the church. Turning away, ashamed and repentant, he moves slowly out of the house, while the girls drops on her knees with her head bowed in agony."

== Cast ==
- Francis X. Bushman - young Payne
- Dorothy Phillips - Ruth Martin

== Reception ==
The Moving Picture World review was positive, describing the film as "unusual" and "certain to make a deep impression." The reviewer also praised the performances of the leads.

Moving Picture World also reported the displeasure of an unnamed Coeur d'Alene, Idaho Catholic priest, who decried the depiction of last rites in a motion picture. He said of the film in a Sunday sermon, that it was "wrong and entirely untrue and incorrect."
