= Kidder & Ko =

1918 film

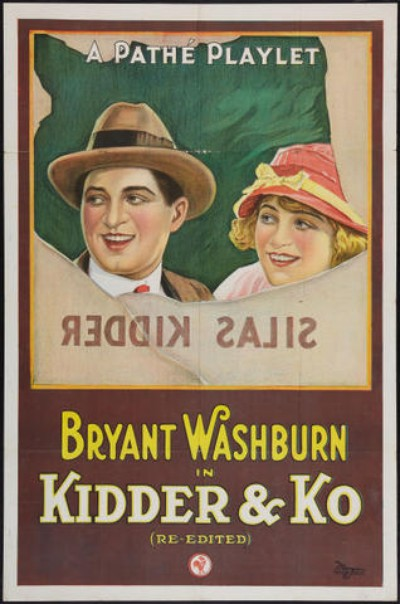
- Film poster
- Directed by: Richard Foster Baker
- Written by: John Grey (story); M. Ramirez-Torres (story); Charles Sarver (scenario)
- Produced by: Diando Film Corporation
- Distributed by: Pathé Exchange
- Release date: June 16, 1918
- Country: United States
- Language: Silent..(English intertitles)

Kidder & Ko is a lost 1918 silent film comedy directed by Richard Foster Baker and starring Bryant Washburn and Gertrude Selby.

== Cast ==
- Bryant Washburn - Cuthbert Kidder
- Harry Dunkinson - Silas Kidder
- Gertrude Selby - Julie Knight
- Wadsworth Harris - James Knight
- Carl Stockdale
