= Rosary Lakes =

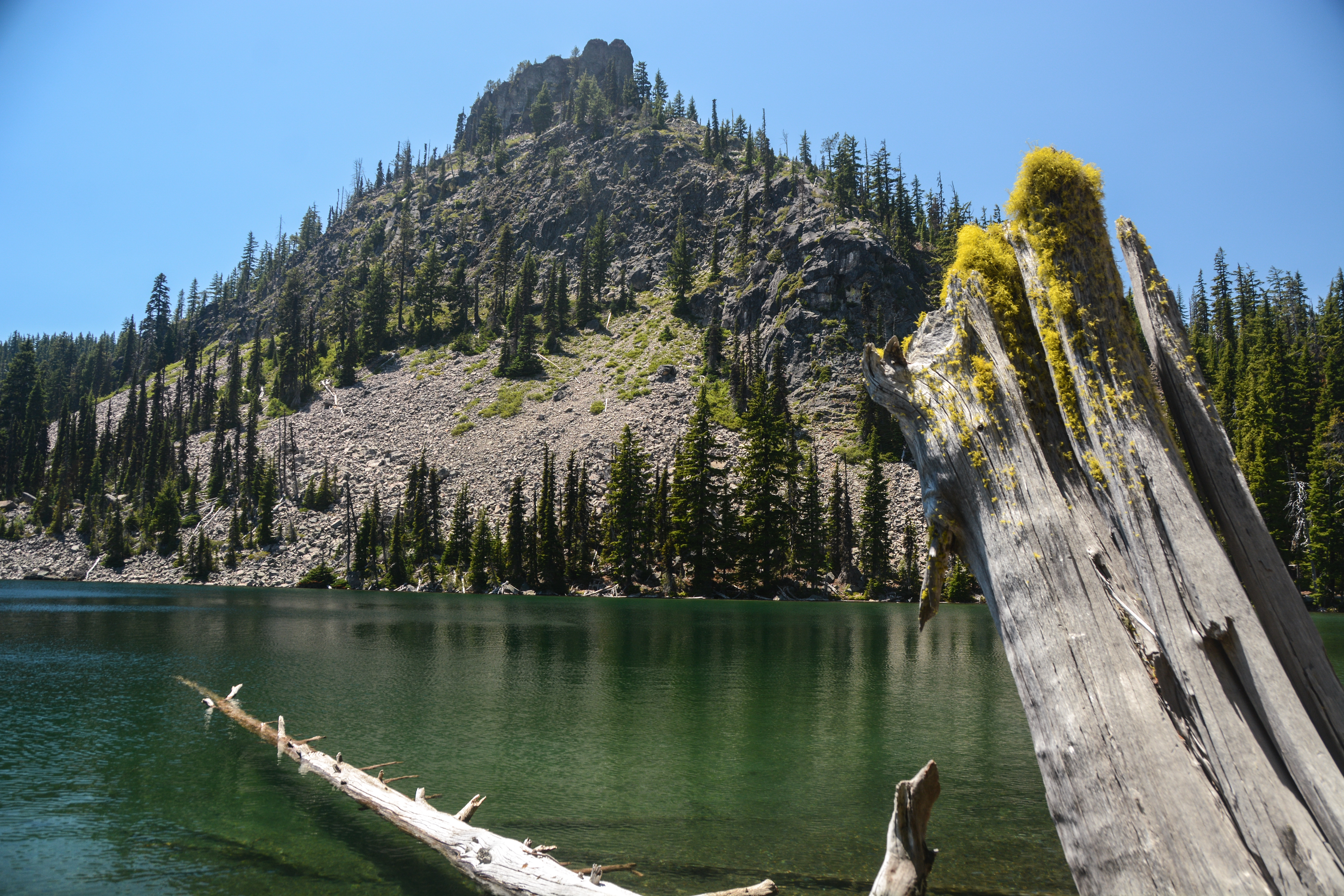
- Pulpit Rock above Middle Rosary Lake
- Interactive map of Rosary Lakes
- Location: Klamath County, Oregon, United States
- Coordinates: 43°38′N 122°5′W
- Type: Group of lakes
- Basin countries: United States

The Rosary Lakes are a group of three lakes in Klamath County, Oregon, in the United States. All three lakes are within the Deschutes National Forest.

The lake group consists of Lower Rosary Lake, Middle Rosary Lake, and North Rosary Lake. The lakes were named from the fact their outlines together resemble the Rosary.

== See also ==
- List of lakes in Oregon
