= The Rosary (house) =

Historic house in London

Coordinates: 51.505°N 0.083°W

The Rosary was a moated house built by King Edward II of England in Southwark, to the east of the southern end of London Bridge, opposite the Tower of London.

At this time, much of the land on the south bank the River Thames was marshy, with sand and gravel islands. Another moated manor house, Dunley Place, owned by the Dunley family, had been constructed to the west, nearer London Bridge, before 1300. Edward II acquired land to the east of Dunley Place in around 1324, taking a lease from Lady Agnes de Dunley, and started construction of a moated pleasure-house, probably largely built with wood, although some stone walls and buttresses have been discovered by archaeologists. Edward II visited the construction site several times, but it was probably not completed before his death in 1327.

Little remained of Dunley Place and the Rosary by 1440, when the land was acquired by Sir John Fastolf. He constructed a large moated residential complex on the site, including a counting house, a chamber for his round table, and a brewery or granary with wharf, all surrounded by a large brick wall with two gatehouses and causeways over the moat. The land was divided after a long-running legal dispute following Fastolf's death in 1459. The area was later used for tidal mills, wharves, and warehouses. The site is now part of Hay's Galleria (formerly Hay's Wharf) and the More London site further east towards Tower Bridge (formerly Gun and Shot Wharf).
