= Bryant Washburn =

American actor (1889–1963)

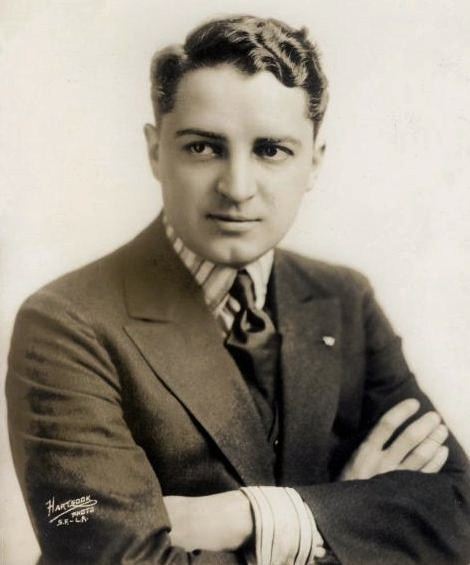
- Washburn, c. 1915
- Born: Franklin Bryant Washburn III; April 28, 1889; Chicago, Illinois, U.S.
- Died: April 30, 1963 (aged 74); Hollywood, California, U.S.
- Occupation: Actor
- Years active: 1911–1947

Franklin Bryant Washburn III (April 28, 1889 – April 30, 1963) was an American actor who appeared in more than 370 films between 1911 and 1947.

== Early years ==
Washburn's parents were Franklin Bryant Washburn II and Metha Catherine Johnson Washburn. He attended Lake View High School in Chicago.

== Career ==
Washburn's early acting experience came in stock theater. He debuted in film in 1911 with Essanay Studios. He quickly became a comedy star after appearing in films such as Skinner's Baby and Skinner's Dress Suit in 1917.

== Personal life ==
Washburn married actress Mabel Forrest in Chicago in 1914, and they had two children. She sued for divorce in January 1928. His second marriage was to actress Virginia Vance. They had a child together.

== Selected filmography ==
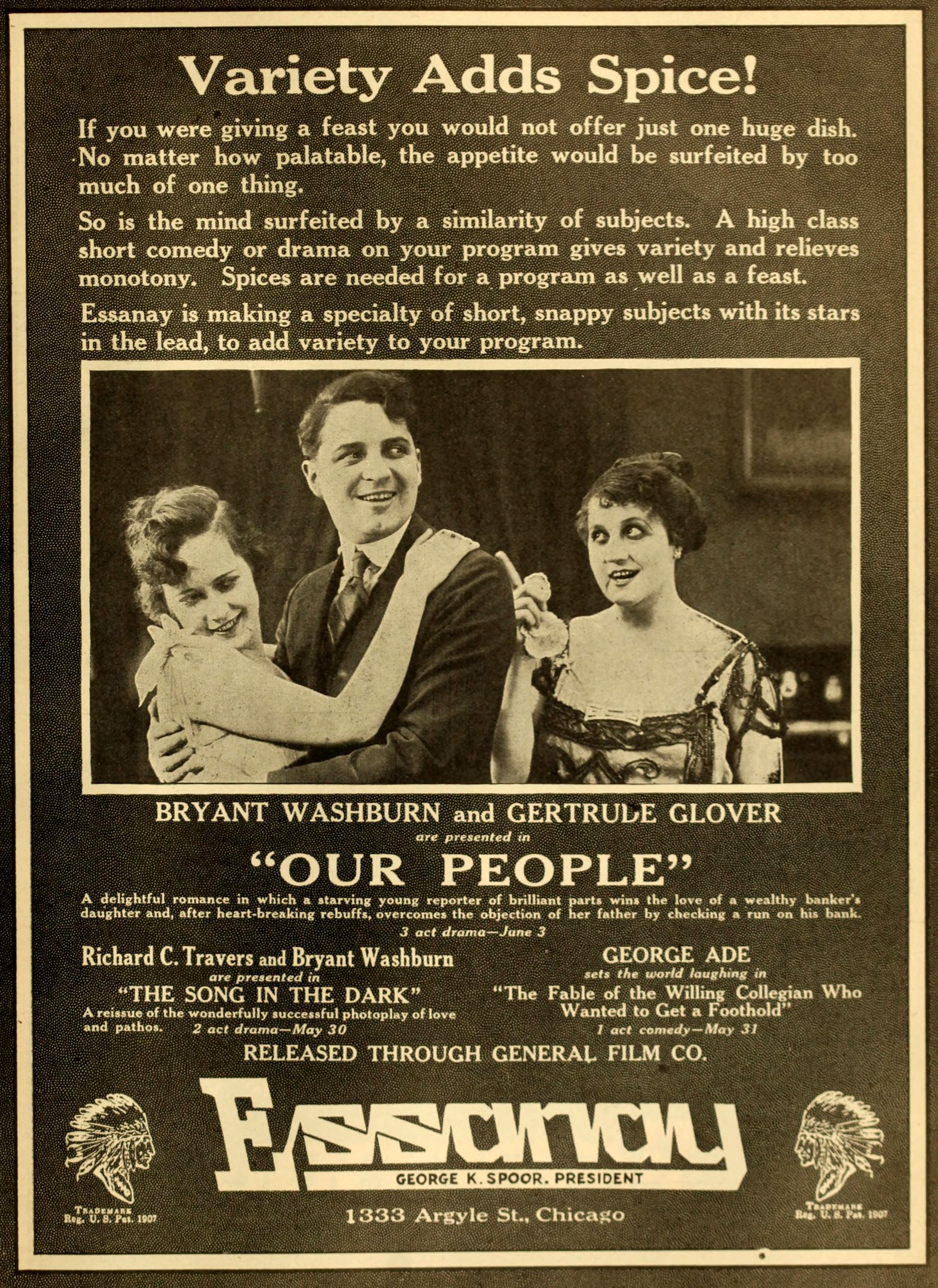
Our People (1916)

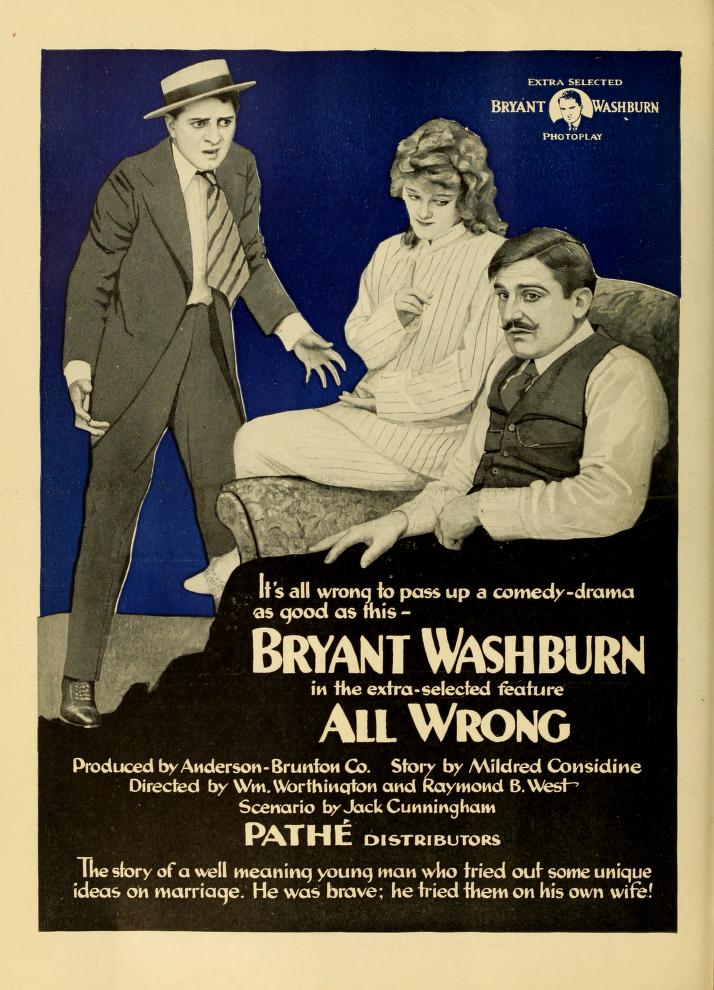
All Wrong (1919)

- The Dark Romance of a Tobacco Tin (1911, short) as Telegraph Clerk
- Saved from the Torrents (1911, short) as Jack Carrington as Katie's Brother
- A False Suspicion (1911, short) as Richard Lee
- He Fought for the U.S.A. (1911, short) as Bob Langdon as Second Brother
- The Madman (1911, short) as Balloonist (uncredited)
- From the Submerged (1912, short)
- The Mail Order Wife (1912) as John White
- Alias Billy Sargent (1912, short) as Hotel Clerk
- When Soul Meets Soul (1913, short)
- The Spy's Defeat (1913, short)
- The Power of Conscience (1913, short) as Byron Waters
- One Wonderful Night (1914) as Howard Devar, Curtis' Friend
- Graustark (1915) as Prince Lorenz
- The Slim Princess (1915) as Rawley Plumston
- The Blindness of Virtue (1915) as Archibald Graham
- The Sky Hunters (1915) as Steve Jackson
- The Crimson Wing (1915) as Lt. von Arnheim
- The Alster Case (1915) as George Swan
- The Havoc (1916) as Paul Hessert
- The Prince of Graustark (1916) as Prince Robin of Graustark
- The Breaker (1916) as John Widder
- Marriage a la Carte (1916)
- Skinner's Dress Suit (1917) as William Manning Skinner
- Skinner's Bubble (1917) as William Manning Skinner
- Filling His Own Shoes (1917) as William Ruggles
- The Man Who Was Afraid (1917) as Benton Clune
- The Golden Idiot (1917) as Barry Owen
- Skinner's Baby (1917) as William Manning Skinner
- The Fibbers (1917) as Peter Cort
- The Voice of Conscience (1917) as Minor Role
- Twenty-One (1918) as Jimmy Mufferton / 'Battling' Dave Carey
- Kidder & Ko (1918) as Cuthbert Kidder
- The Ghost of the Rancho (1918) as Jeffrey Wall
- Till I Come Back to You (1918) as Capt. Jefferson Strong
- The Gypsy Trail (1918) as Edward Andrews
- The Way of a Man with a Maid (1918) as Arthur McArney
- Venus in the East (1919) as Buddy McNair
- The Poor Boob (1919) as Simpson Hightower
- Something to Do (1919) as Jack Merrill
- Putting It Over (1919) as Robert 'Buddy' Marsh
- All Wrong (1919) as Warren Kent
- A Very Good Young Man (1919) as LeRoy Sylvester
- Love Insurance (1919) as Dick Minot
- Why Smith Left Home (1919) as John Brown Smith
- It Pays to Advertise (1919) as Rodney Martin
- Too Much Johnson (1919) as Augustus Billings
- The Six Best Cellars (1920) as Henry Carpenter
- Mrs. Temple's Telegram (1920) as Jack Temple
- The Sins of St. Anthony (1920) as Anthony Osgood
- What Happened to Jones (1920) as Jimmie Jones
- A Full House (1920) as George Howell
- Burglar Proof (1920) as John Harlow
- An Amateur Devil (1920) as Carver Endicott
- The Road to London (1921) as Rex Rowland
- June Madness (1922) as Ken Pauling
- White Shoulders (1922) as Cole Hawkins
- Hungry Hearts (1922) as David
- The Woman Conquers (1922) as Frederick Van Court, III
- Night Life in Hollywood (1922) as himself
- Temptation (1923) as Jack Baldwin
- Mary of the Movies (1923) as himself (uncredited)
- Rupert of Hentzau (1923) as Count Fritz
- Hollywood (1923, lost film) as himself
- Mine to Keep (1923) as Victor Olney
- The Common Law (1923) as John Buleson
- The Love Trap (1923) as Martin Antrim
- The Meanest Man in the World (1923) as Ned Stevens
- Other Men's Daughters (1923) as Alaska Kid
- Try and Get It (1924) as Joseph Merrill
- Hello, 'Frisco (1924) as himself
- My Husband's Wives (1924) as William Harvey
- The Star Dust Trail (1924) as John Warding
- The Parasite (1925) as Doctor Brooks
- Wizard of Oz (1925) as Prince Kynd
- Passionate Youth (1925) as Corbin
- Wandering Footsteps (1925) as Hal Whitney
- Wet Paint (1926) as Her brother
- Meet the Prince (1926)
- Her Sacrifice (1926) as Donald Gorham
- Young April (1926) as Prince Michael
- Flames (1926) as Hilary Fenton
- The Love Thrill (1927) J. Anthony Creelman
- Beware of Widows (1927)
- The King of Kings (1927) as Young Roman
- Black Tears (1927)
- Sitting Bull at the Spirit Lake Massacre (1927) as Donald Keefe
- Breakfast at Sunrise (1927) as Marquis
- In the First Degree (1927) as Philip Stanwood
- The Chorus Kid (1928) as John Powell
- Modern Daughters (1927)
- Jazzland (1928)
- A Bit of Heaven (1928)
- Honeymoon Flats (1928) as Tom Twitchell
- Nothing to Wear (1928) as Tommy Butler
- Swing High (1930)
- Kept Husbands (1931) as Charles Bates
- Crashing Hollywood (1931)
- Stout Hearts and Willing Hands (1931)
- The Lure of Hollywood (1931)
- The Mystery Train (1931) as William Mortimer
- Thrill of Youth (1932) as Colby Sherwood
- The Arm of the Law (1932) as John Welling
- Drifting Souls (1932) as Littlefield
- What Price Hollywood? (1932) as Washed-Up Star (uncredited)
- Night of Terror (1933) as John Rinehart
- Devil's Mate (1933) as District Attorney
- The Woman Who Dared (1933)
- Cleopatra (1934) as Undetermined Role (uncredited)
- Tailspin Tommy (1934, Serial) as Mr. Grant, director of Midnight Patrol
- The Call of the Savage (1935) as Dr. Harry Trevor
- Swellhead (1935) as Malone
- The Drunkard (1935) as Mr. Karnes
- Danger Ahead (1935) as Nick Conrad
- The Throwback (1935) as Jack Thorne
- Tailspin Tommy in the Great Air Mystery (1935) as Ned Curtis, Betty's uncle and a heroic oil tycoon
- Taming the Wild (1936) as Bert Graham
- The Preview Murder Mystery (1936) as Carl Jennings
- The Millionaire Kid (1936) as Terry Malone
- It Couldn't Have Happened – But It Did (1936) as Norman Carter
- Gambling with Souls (1936) as 'Million Dollar' Taylor
- Wanted! Jane Turner (1936) as Magee
- Conflict (1936) as City Editor
- The Toast of New York (1937) as Vanderbilt's Broker (uncredited)
- Sky Patrol (1939) as Brainbridge
- Abe Lincoln in Illinois (1940) as Minor Role (uncredited)
- King of the Royal Mounted (1940, Serial) as Matt Crandall
- Adventures of Captain Marvel (1941, Serial) as Harry Carlyle
- The Spider Returns (1941) as Westfall
- Paper Bullets (1941) as Attorney Bruce King
- Shadows on the Sage (1942) as Banker John Carson
- Sin Town (1942) as Anderson
- War Dogs (1942) as Col. Mason
- Carson City Cyclone (1943) as Doctor Andrews
- The Law Rides Again (1943) as Commissioner Lee
- The Girl from Monterrey (1943) as Fight Commissioner Bogart
- Nabonga (1944) as White Hunter
- Follow the Leader (1944) as Colonel
- The Falcon in Mexico (1944) as Humphrey Wade, artist
- West of the Pecos (1945) as Doc Howard
