= Francis X. Bushman =

American actor, director, writer (1883–1966)

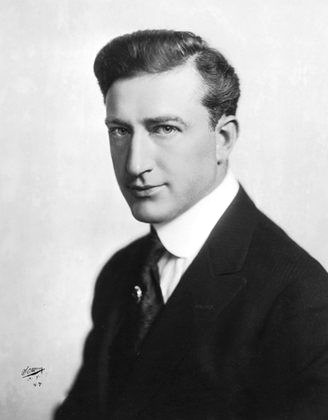
- Bushman in 1912
- Born: Francis Xavier Bushman; January 10, 1883; Baltimore, Maryland, U.S.
- Died: August 23, 1966 (aged 83); Los Angeles, California, U.S.
- Resting place: Forest Lawn Memorial Park, Glendale, California
- Occupations: Actor, director, writer
- Years active: 1911–1966
- Height: 1.83 m (6 ft 0 in)
- Spouses: Josephine Louisa Fladung (m. 1902; div. 1918) Beverly Bayne (m. 1918; div. 1925) Norma Emily Atkin (m. 1932; died 1956) Iva Millicent Richardson (m. 1956)

Francis Xavier Bushman (January 10, 1883 – August 23, 1966) was an American film actor and director. His career as a matinee idol started in 1911 in the silent film His Friend's Wife. He gained a large female following and was one of the biggest stars of the 1910s and early '20s.

Bushman, like many of his contemporaries, broke into the moving picture business via the stage. He rose to fame at Essanay Studios in Chicago, where he was first noticed for his muscular, sculpted frame. He appeared in nearly 200 feature film roles—more than 175 films before 1920, and 27 in his screen debut year of 1911 alone. He also worked for the Vitagraph studio before signing with Metro in 1915. He later went into radio and television.

== Biography ==
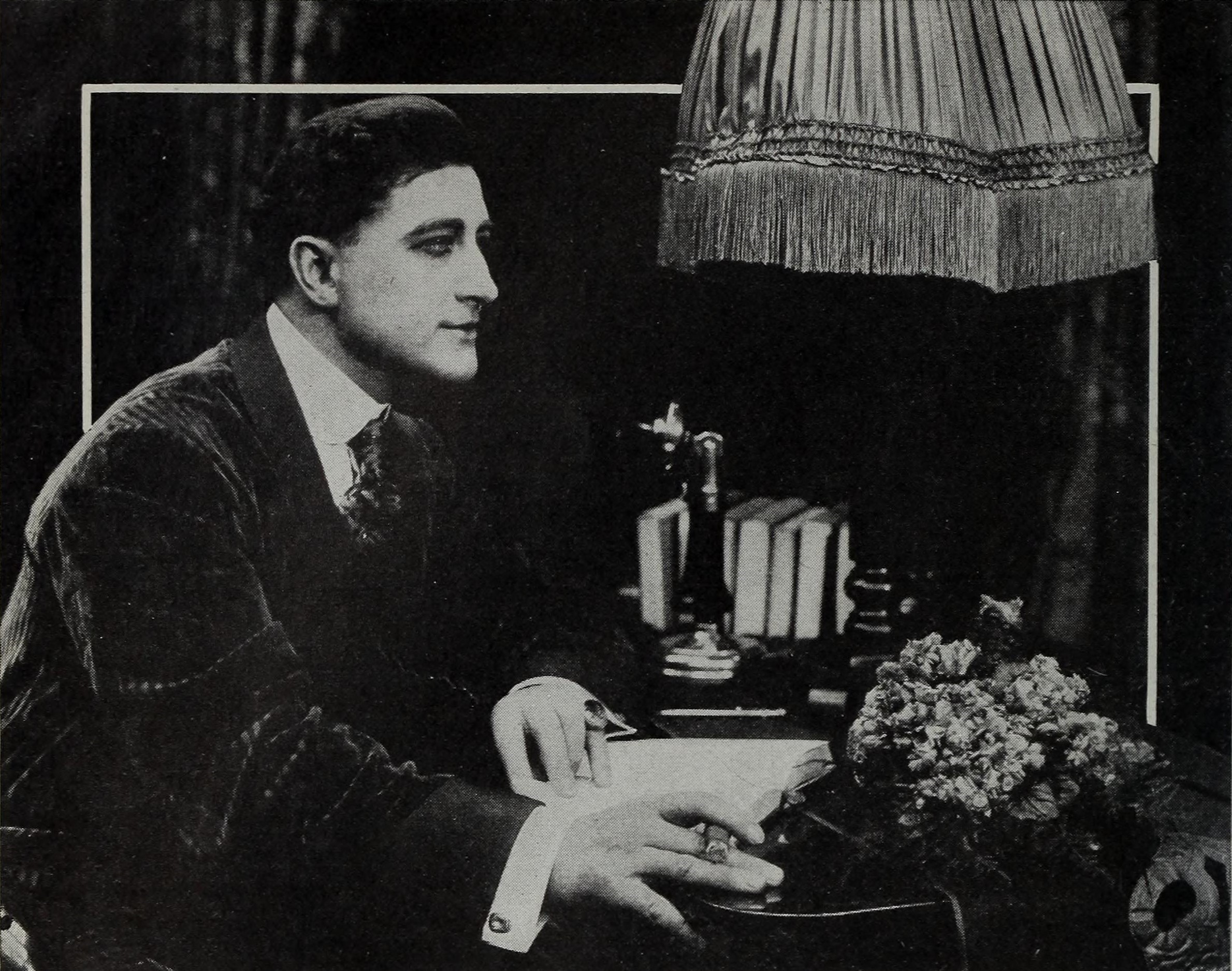
Bushman in 1915

Bushman was born in Baltimore, Maryland. As a young man he joined the Maryland Athletic Club and began a body building regimen that would give him his famous film physique. He cited Eugen Sandow as one of his body building influences. In New York City, he worked as a sculptor's model, often posing in the nude in sessions. In 1902, he married seamstress Josephine Louisa Fladung. By the launch of his film career, the couple had five children. After appearing in theater, Bushman was hired by Essanay Studios in Chicago in 1911, launching his film career and stardom. Over the next five years he appeared generally as the leading man in over a hundred silent films for the studio. The studio's publicity department kept secret his marriage from his fans, who sent him thousands of letters, including marriage proposals.

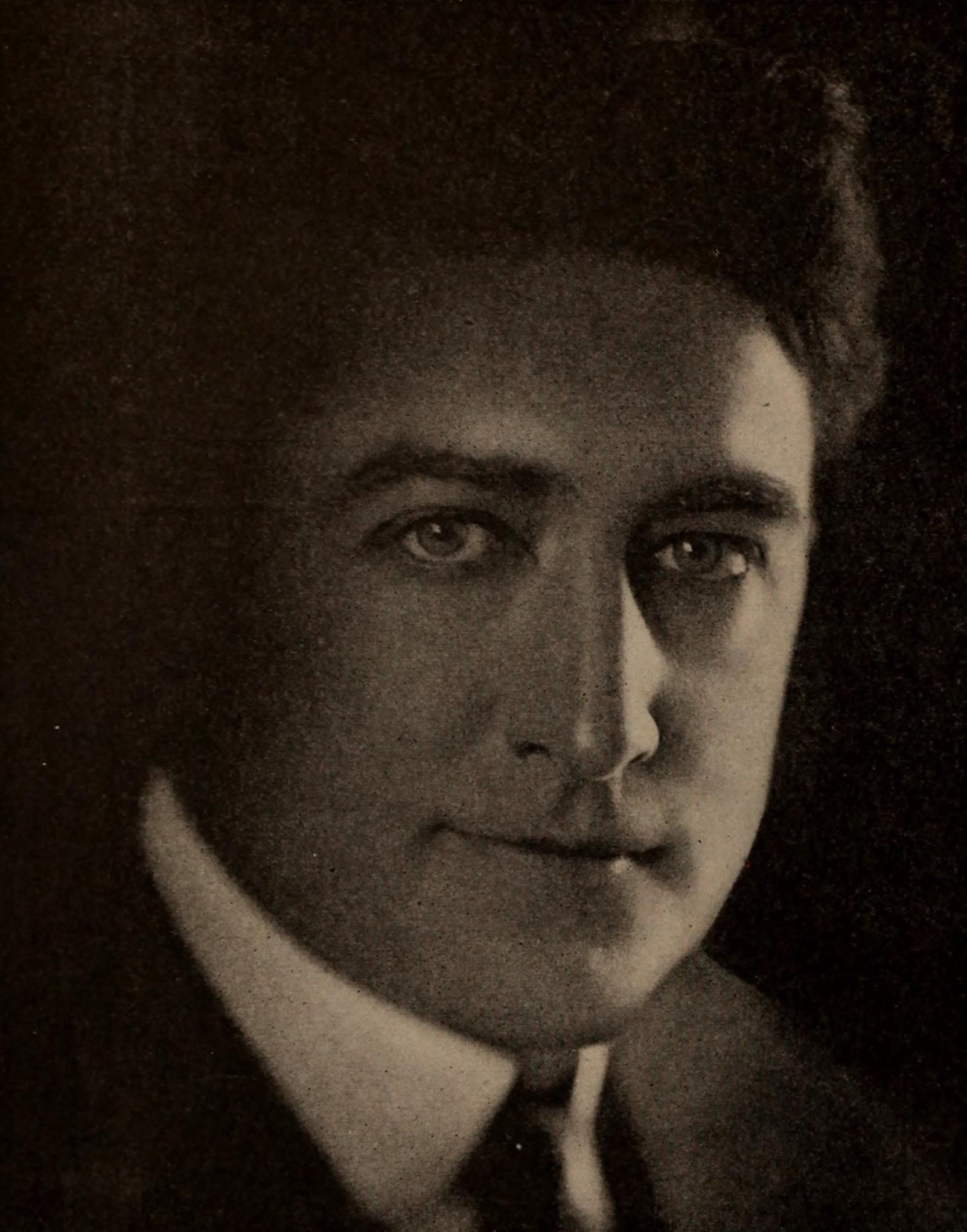
Bushman in 1916

In 1918, he was the subject of a national scandal as his affair with longtime costar Beverly Bayne became public. Three days after his divorce with Josephine was final, Bushman and Bayne were married; they would eventually have a son. Bushman and his studios had kept his marriage secret for fear of losing popularity. He was married four times. In late 1919 and 1920, Bushman and Bayne co-starred in the stage play The Master Thief, from a story by Richard Washburn Child, which successfully toured the country.

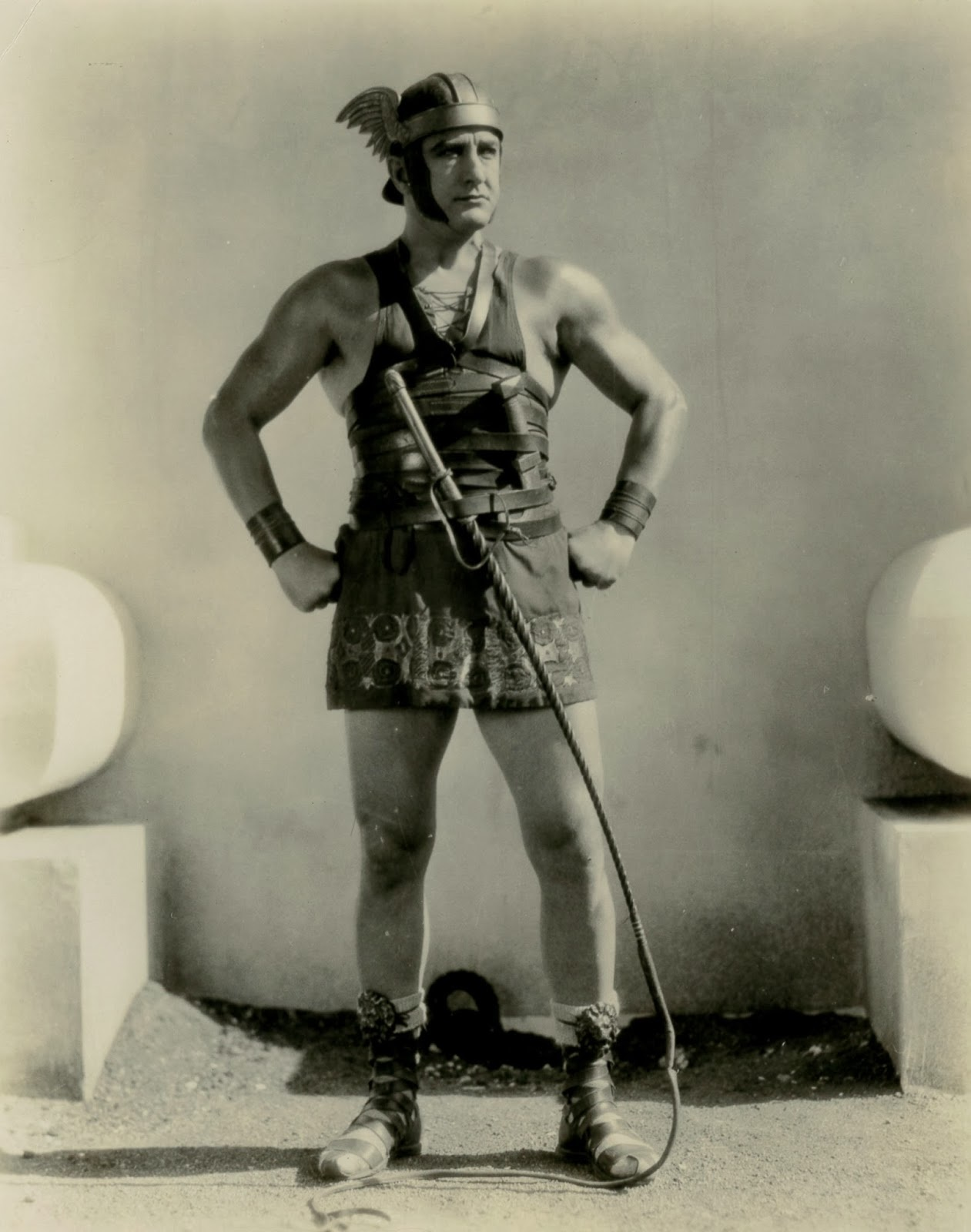
Bushman as Messala in Ben-Hur

Bushman eventually retained the services of Harry Reichenbach as his agent. When Bushman noted that he would be well-suited to starring in an upcoming 1925 film, Ben-Hur, Reichenbach had a plan to increase his client's marketability. From a railway station, Reichenbach took Bushman to see studio executives, while dropping pennies to the street from his pocket. Many people followed the two, picking up the coins along the way. The crowd gave the studio executives the impression that Bushman was very popular, and they cast him as Messala. Bushman was concerned that playing a villain would affect his career, so he asked the advice of William S. Hart, who had played the part on stage for years. "Take it," Hart advised. "It's the best part in the play!" Unlike Ramon Novarro, the star of the picture, Bushman knew how to drive a team of horses and a chariot without getting severely injured or killed in the process. When Ben Hur was remade in 1959, Charlton Heston had to learn the technique and quipped: "The only man in Hollywood who can drive a chariot is Francis X. Bushman — and he's too old!"

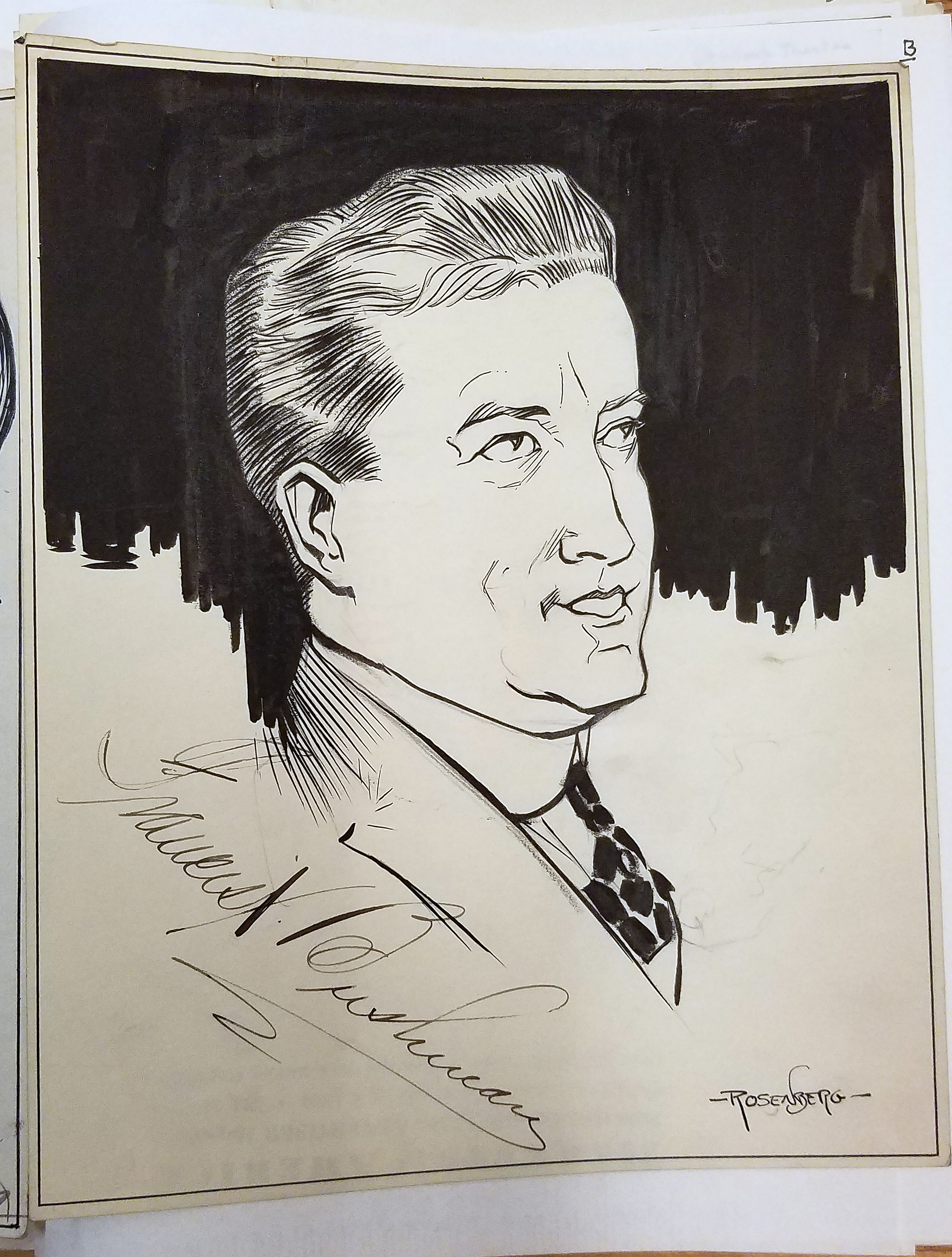
Francis X Bushman autographed sketch by Manuel Rosenberg for the Cincinnati Post, 1920

Bushman was paid large salaries during his screen career, and donated the land upon which Sid Grauman erected his famous Chinese Theater. But his fortune was wiped out in the Wall Street Crash of 1929, and his career as a movie star had had its run. After his film career had waned, Bushman made his broadcasting mark on the CBS Radio network's long-running dramatic serial entitled Those We Love. In the soap opera, which ran from 1938 to 1945, he played the role of John Marshall, father of twins played by Richard Cromwell and Nan Grey. Robert Cummings rounded out the cast. Bushman took small roles in pictures, appearing perhaps most prominently as a business tycoon in Billy Wilder's 1954 film Sabrina, and attempted to run a few small businesses, all of which lost money. On viewing one of his early films, Bushman is said to have remarked, "My God, look at that! I'm putting all my emotion into my chin!"

In later years, Bushman made guest appearances on American television in the 1950s and 1960s. On February 6, 1958, he and his wife Iva Millicent Richardson appeared on the quiz show You Bet Your Life with Groucho Marx and won $1,000 by successfully answering questions in a geography quiz. He also performed on weekly sitcoms and television dramas, including Burns and Allen, Peter Gunn, Make Room for Daddy, The Many Loves of Dobie Gillis, Perry Mason, The Adventures of Ozzie and Harriet, and Dr. Kildare. Bushman guest-starred as well in 1966 on a two-part episode of Batman. Both Bushman and Neil Hamilton, his co-star in The Grip of the Yukon, appeared in the Batman episode—their first reunion acting together in 38 years. Bushman's role as a wealthy collector of silent pictures and promoter of a silent film festival (Batman episodes 31 & 32) was his last appearance on camera.

Bushman is mentioned numerous times by the character Pearl Bodine in the first season of The Beverly Hillbillies. In the episode entitled "No Place Like Home," Pearl has written a song which she plays when the silent version of Ben-Hur is shown in the Clampetts' hometown. In a later episode, when Pearl visits the Clampetts in Los Angeles, she speaks about hoping to meet Bushman. In the episode "Jed's Dilemma," Jed takes the family on a sightseeing tour of Beverly Hills. When passing a fancy home, Pearl wonders if it could be the home of a movie star, possibly Francis X. Bushman. Jed tells her it cannot be Bushman's home because he got a good look in the yard and did not see room for horses or a chariot.

== Death ==
Bushman suffered a heart attack and died at his home in Pacific Palisades, California, on August 23, 1966. He was interred in the Freedom Mausoleum at Forest Lawn Memorial Park Cemetery in Glendale, California.

== Filmography ==
See Francis X. Bushman filmography.

=== Television ===
Year	Title	Role	Notes
1954	The Pepsi-Cola Playhouse		Episode "Hollywood, Home Sweet Home"
1954	Schlitz Playhouse	Max	Episode "The Secret"
1957	Mr. Adams and Eve	Himself	Episode "The Business Manager"
1957	Official Detective	John Cosgrove	Episode "Missing"
1958	The Court of Last Resort	Priest	Episode "Missing"
1958	The Adventures of Ozzie and Harriet	Dr. Russell	Episode "The Bachelor"
1958	77 Sunset Strip	Bramwell Stone	Episode "All Our Yesterdays"
1959	The Danny Thomas Show	George - Traffic Court Judge	Episode "Rusty's Day in Court"
1959-1960	General Electric Theatre	Philip Vandermoot/Abgarus	Two episodes
1960	The Many Loves of Dobie Gillis	Prof. Millican	Episode "The Flying Millicans"
1960	Shotgun Slade	Eckhart	Episode "Crossed Guns"
1960-1964	Perry Mason	Lawrence King/Courtney Jeffers/Philip	Three episodes
1961	Peter Gunn	Clinton Hobart	Episode "Last Resort"
1965	Dr. Kildare	Mr. Cooper	Episode "Life in the Dance Hall"
1966	Batman	Mr. Van Jones	Two episodes
1966	Voyage to the Bottom of the Sea	Old Man	Episode "The Terrible Toys"

== Legacy ==
His son Ralph Everly Bushman (1903–1978) had a film career from the 1920s through the 1940s. Tall (6'4") and good-looking, he was in over 40 films, often playing stuffy upper-class types or menacing gangsters. In Brown of Harvard (1926) he was cast against William Haines and Jack Pickford. He was often billed as "Francis X. Bushman Jr."

Francis Bushman's granddaughter, Barbara Bushman Quine (1925–2013), married actor Harry Morgan. A grandson, Pat Conway (1931–1981), the son of film director Jack Conway and Bushman's daughter, Virginia, starred on the ABC western television series Tombstone Territory.

For his contributions to the film industry, Bushman was inducted into the Hollywood Walk of Fame in 1960 with a motion pictures star located at 1651 Vine Street.
