= One Wonderful Night =

One Wonderful Night may refer to:

- One Wonderful Night (1914 film), an American silent mystery drama film
- One Wonderful Night (1922 film), an American silent mystery film
