= Uneasy Money =

Uneasy Money may refer to:

- Uneasy Money (novel), a 1916 novel by P. G. Wodehouse
- Uneasy Money (1918 film), an American silent romantic comedy film, based on the novel
- Uneasy Money (1926 film), a German silent film
