= Rapley Holmes =

Canadian actor

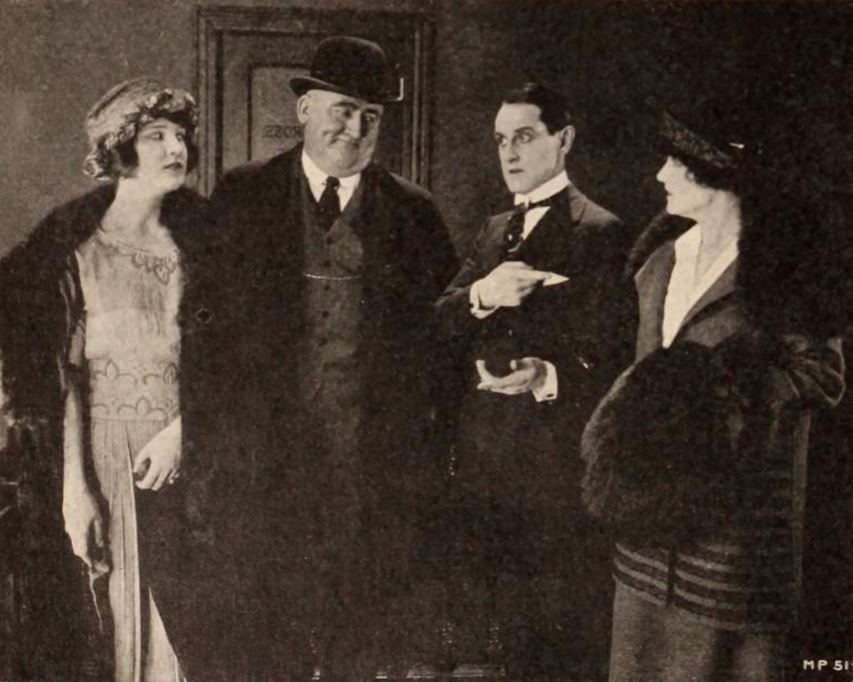
- Holmes (second from left) in Nothing But Lies, 1920
- Born: June 1, 1867; St. Marys, Ontario, Canada
- Died: January 11, 1928 (aged 60); Strathroy, Ontario, Canada
- Resting place: Strathroy, Ontario, Canada; 43°00′N 81°30′W
- Occupation: Actor
- Spouse: Gerda Holmes

Rapley Holmes (June 1, 1868 – January 11, 1928) was a stage and screen actor. He was born in Canada and married actress Gerda Holmes.

Holmes played the part of Joe Horn in the long running Somerset Maugham play Rain (1922) starring Jeanne Eagels. On stage he appeared with many greats of the Edwardian era including Maxine Elliott, Elsie Ferguson, Nance O'Neil, Doug Fairbanks and both William and Dustin Farnum.

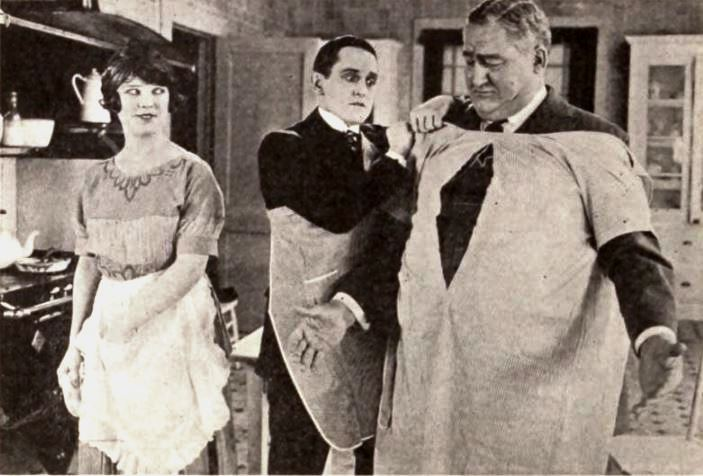
Holmes (right) with Justine Johnstone and Taylor Holmes(no relation) in Nothing But Lies, 1920

Holmes began appearing in silent films in 1914 while still maintaining an active role in Broadway plays. His last film role was in 1920, two years before the huge hit of Rain. Acting in Rain dominated the rest of Holmes's career up until his death in January 1928. His role in Rain was played by James A. Marcus in the 1928 Gloria Swanson hit re-titled Sadie Thompson and by Guy Kibbee in the 1932 talkie Rain with Joan Crawford.

== Selected filmography ==
- One Wonderful Night (1914)
- The Verdict (1914), a short
- Through Eyes of Love (1914), a short
- The Fable of the People's Choice Who Answered the Call of Duty and Took Seltzer (1914)*short
- Within Three Hundred Pages (1914)*short
- The Servant Question (1914), a short
- The Means and the End (1914), a short
- The Buffer (1914), a short
- The Place, the Time and the Man (1914)*short
- The Fable of the Bush League Lover Who Failed to Qualify (1914), a short
- The Battle of Love (1914)
- The Fable of the City Grafter and the Unprotected Rubes (1915), a short
- The Fable of Hifaluting Tillie and Her Plain Parents (1915), a short
- The Fable of the Syndicate Lover (1915)*short
- The Creed of the Clan (1915), a short
- The Fable of Elvira and Farina and the Meal Ticket (1915)*short
- The Fable of the Cold Gray Dawn of the Morning After (1915)*short
- The Victory of Virtue (1915)
- Gloria's Romance (1916)
- Nothing But Lies (1920)
- The Servant Question (1920)
