= Ruggles of Red Gap (1918 film) =

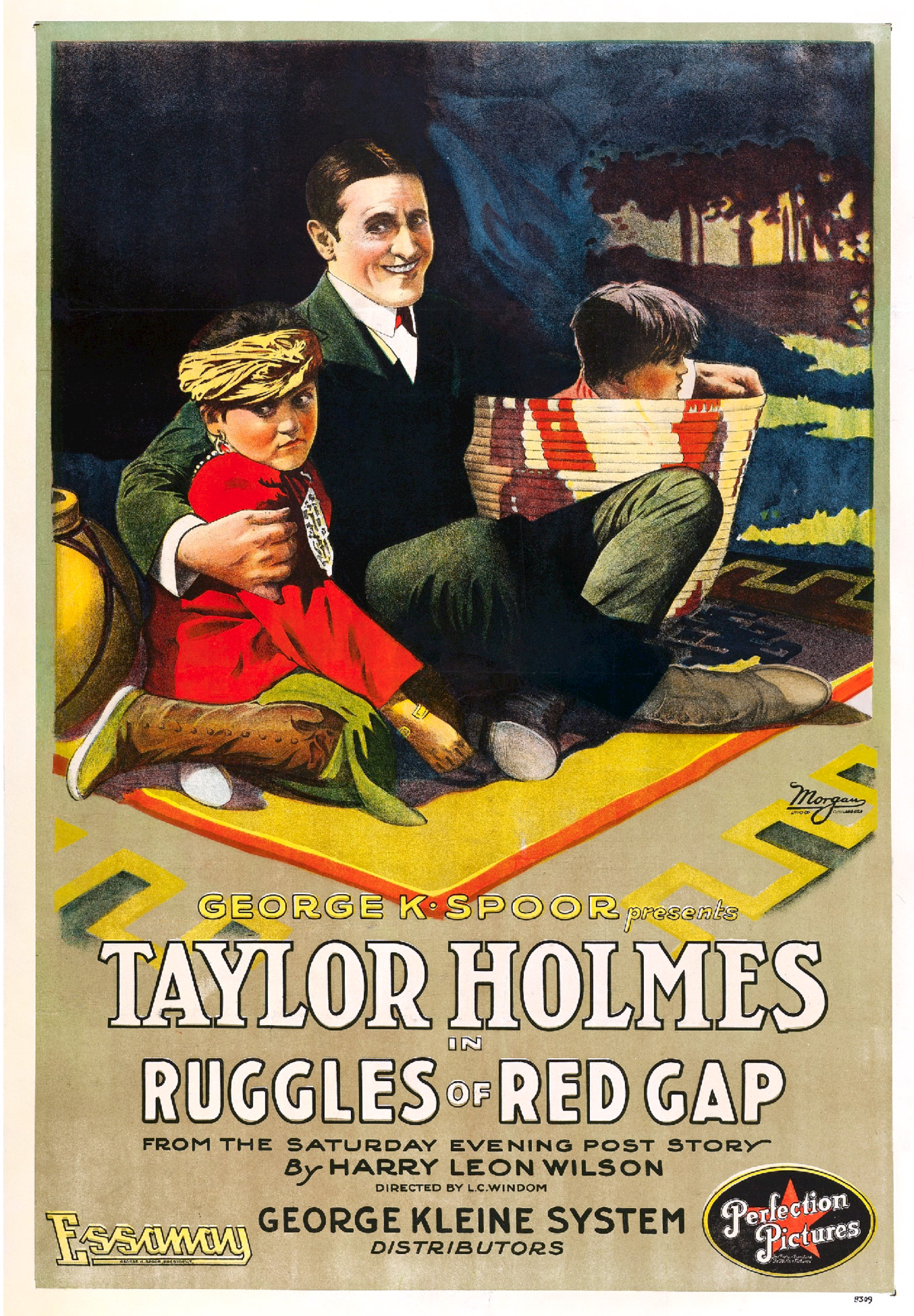
- Film poster
- Directed by: Lawrence C. Windom
- Written by: Charles J. McGuirk
- Based on: Ruggles of Red Gap; 1915 novel by Harry Leon Wilson
- Starring: Taylor Holmes
- Cinematography: Arthur Reeves
- Production company: Essanay Studios
- Distributed by: George Kleine System
- Release date: February 25, 1918
- Running time: 7 reels
- Country: United States
- Language: Silent (English intertitles)

Ruggles of Red Gap is a lost 1918 American silent comedy film directed by Lawrence C. Windom and starring Taylor Holmes, a Broadway stage actor. It was produced by veteran film company Essanay Studios. It was based on Harry Leon Wilson's novel Ruggles of Red Gap.

== Cast ==
- Taylor Holmes as Marmaduke Ruggles
- Frederick Burton as Cousin Egbert Floud
- Lawrence D'Orsay as Honorable George Vane-Basingwell
- Virginia Valli as Widow Judson
- Edna Phillips as "Klondike" Kate Kenner
- Lillian Drew as Mrs. Effie Floud
- Rose Mayo as Ma Pettingill
- Charles Lane as Earl of Brinstead
- Rod La Rocque as Belknap Jackson
- Frances Conrad as Mrs. Belknap Jackson
- James F. Fulton as Jeff Tuttle
- Ferdinand Munier as Senator Floud
