= The Iron Ring (film) =

1917 film directed by George Archainbaud

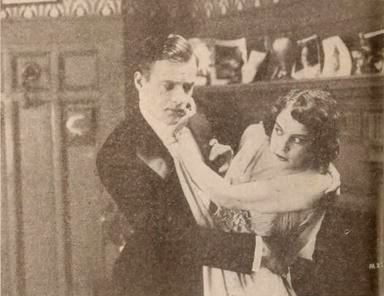
- Directed by: George Archainbaud
- Written by: Horace Hazeltine
- Produced by: William A. Brady
- Starring: Edward Langford; Gerda Holmes; Arthur Ashley
- Cinematography: Philip Hatkin
- Production company: Peerless Productions
- Distributed by: World Film
- Release date: July 30, 1917
- Running time: 5 reels
- Country: United States
- Languages: Silent; English intertitles

The Iron Ring is a 1917 American silent drama film directed by George Archainbaud and starring Edward Langford, Gerda Holmes and Arthur Ashley. It was shot at Fort Lee in New Jersey.

== Cast ==
- Edward Langford as Aleck Hulette
- Gerda Holmes as Bess Hulette
- Arthur Ashley as Jack Delamore
- J. Herbert Frank as Ellery Leonard
- George MacQuarrie as Stephen Graves
- George Cowl as Charles Brown
- Alexandria Carewe as Mrs. Georgie Leonard
- Gladys Thompson as Dorothy Delamore
- Victor Kennard as Dr. Hogue
- Richard Clarke as Sloane

== Bibliography ==
- Paul C. Spehr. The Movies Begin: Making Movies in New Jersey, 1887-1920. Newark Museum, 1977.
