= Untamed Heiress =

1954 film by Charles Lamont

- Theatrical release poster
- Directed by: Charles Lamont
- Screenplay by: Barry Shipman
- Story by: Jack Townley
- Produced by: Sidney Picker
- Starring: Judy Canova; Don "Red" Barry; George Cleveland; Taylor Holmes; Chick Chandler; Jack Kruschen
- Cinematography: Reggie Lanning
- Edited by: Arthur Roberts
- Music by: Stanley Wilson
- Production company: Republic Pictures
- Distributed by: Republic Pictures
- Release date: April 1, 1954
- Running time: 70 minutes
- Country: United States
- Language: English
- Budget: $271,393
- Box office: $295,609

Untamed Heiress is a 1954 American comedy film directed by Charles Lamont, written by Barry Shipman and starring Judy Canova, Don "Red" Barry, George Cleveland, Taylor Holmes, Chick Chandler and Jack Kruschen. It was released on April 1, 1954, by Republic Pictures.

== Cast ==
- Judy Canova as Judy
- Don "Red" Barry as 'Spider' Mike Lawrence
- George Cleveland as Andrew 'Cactus' Clayton
- Taylor Holmes as Walter Martin
- Chick Chandler as Eddie Taylor
- Jack Kruschen as Louie
- Hugh Sanders as Williams
- Douglas Fowley as Pal
- William Haade as Friend
- Ellen Corby as Mrs. Flanny

== Reception ==
After distribution, advertising and prints the film recorded a loss of $126,363.
