= Notoriety (1922 film) =

1922 silent film

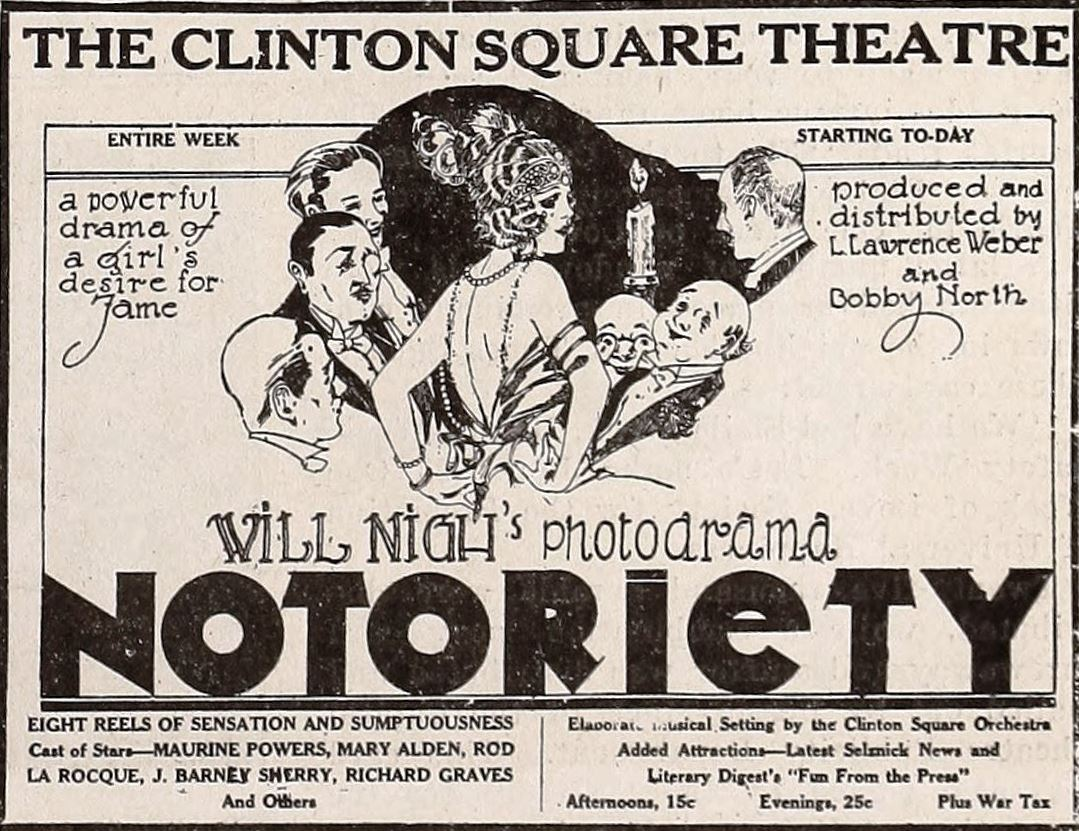
- Directed by: William Nigh
- Written by: William Nigh
- Starring: Maurine Powers; Mary Alden; Rod La Rocque
- Cinematography: James Diamond
- Edited by: William Nigh
- Production companies: Weber & North Productions
- Distributed by: Apollo Trading Corporation
- Release date: October 3, 1922
- Running time: 80 minutes
- Country: United States
- Languages: Silent; English intertitles

Notoriety is a 1922 American silent drama film directed by William Nigh and starring Maurine Powers, Mary Alden and Rod La Rocque.

== Cast ==
- Maurine Powers as 'Pigeon' Deering
- Mary Alden as Ann Boland
- Rod La Rocque as Arthur Beal
- George Hackathorne as Batty
- Richard Travers as Tom Robbins
- J. Barney Sherry as Horace Wedderburn
- Mona Lisa as Dorothy Wedderburn
- Anders Randolf as Theatrical Agent
- John Goldsworthy as Van Dyke Gibson
- Ida Waterman as Mrs. Beal
- William Gudgeon as The Hired Man

== Bibliography ==
- Munden, Kenneth White. The American Film Institute Catalog of Motion Pictures Produced in the United States, Part 1. University of California Press, 1997.
