= Leslie King (actor) =

American actor

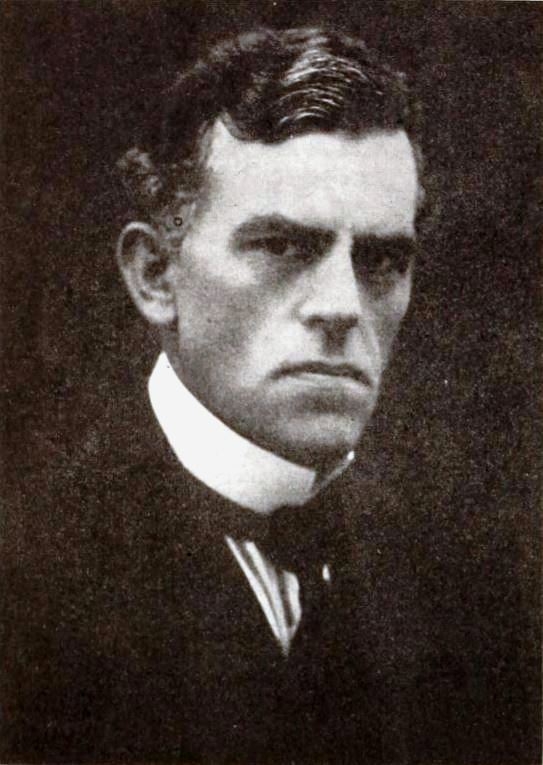
- Born: Leslie T. King; 1876; Baltimore, Maryland
- Died: October 10, 1947; Amityville, New York
- Occupation: Actor

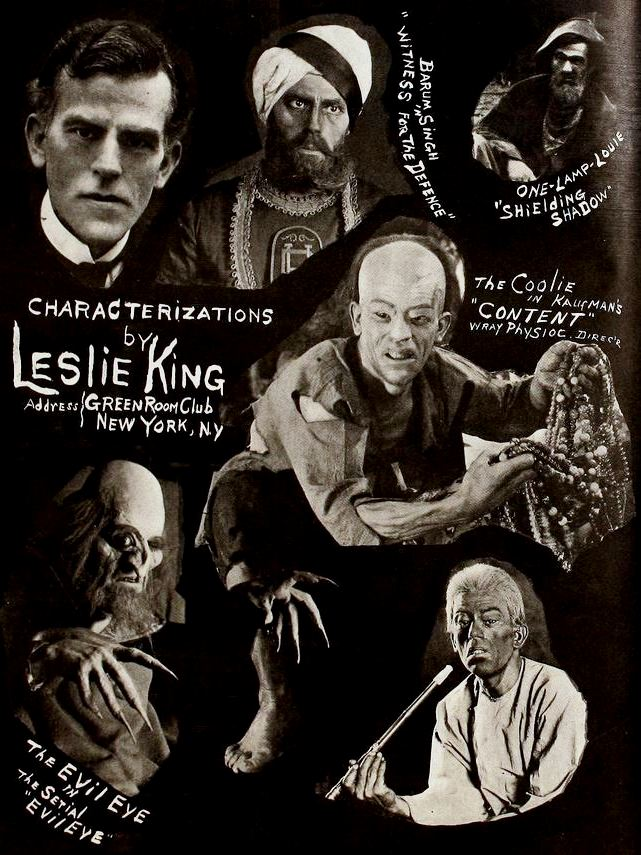
Characterizations by Leslie King.

Leslie King (1876 - October 10, 1947) was an American stage and screen actor. He is best remembered for appearing as Jacques-Forget-Not in D. W. Griffith's Orphans of the Storm opposite Lillian and Dorothy Gish.

== Selected filmography ==
- The Shielding Shadow (1916)
- Here Comes the Bride (1919)
- The Witness for the Defense (1919)
- The Fatal Fortune (1919)
- The Evil Eye (1920)
- Idols of Clay (1920)
- Experience (1921)
- Orphans of the Storm (1921)
- The Bond Boy (1922)
- The Streets of New York (1922)
- If Winter Comes (1923)
- Broadway Broke (1923)
- The New School Teacher (1924)
- Alice in Wonderland (1931)
- The Horror (1932)
