= The Right That Failed =

1922 film directed by Bayard Veiller

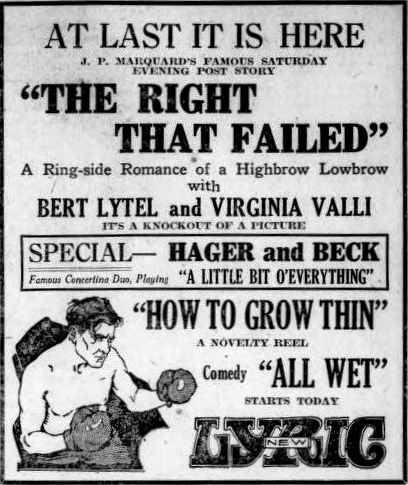
- Newspaper advertisement
- Directed by: Bayard Veiller
- Written by: Lenore Coffee
- Based on: "The Right That Failed" by John Phillips Marquand
- Starring: Bert Lytell; Virginia Valli; De Witt Jennings
- Cinematography: Arthur Martinelli
- Production company: Metro Pictures
- Release date: February 20, 1922 (US)
- Running time: 5 reels
- Country: United States
- Language: Silent (English intertitles)

The Right That Failed is a 1922 American silent melodrama film directed by Bayard Veiller. Based on a short story by John Phillips Marquand, the film stars Bert Lytell, Virginia Valli, and De Witt Jennings. It was released by Metro Pictures on February 20, 1922. It is not known whether the film currently survives.

== Plot ==
As described in a film magazine, prize fighter Johnny Duffey falls in love with a young society woman Constance Talbot. When he breaks his right hand in a bout and is forced to rest for three months, Johnny goes to the fashionable resort Craigmoor to be near Constance. One of his hero-worshipers, a chauffeur, becomes his valet and tutor in correct social etiquette. Constances father recognizes Johnny but keeps his secret until Johnny whips Roy Van Twiller, a cad who was attempting to expose him. Constance learns Johnny's true profession, and they obtain her parents’ approval for their marriage.

== Cast ==
- Bert Lytell as Johnny Duffey
- Virginia Valli as Constance Talbot
- De Witt Jennings as Mr. Talbot
- Philo McCullough as Roy Van Twiller
- Otis Harlan as Mr. Duffey
- Max Davidson as Michael Callahan
