= Wild Oranges =

1924 film directed by King Vidor

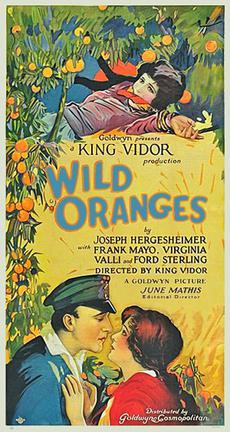
- Film poster
- Directed by: King Vidor
- Written by: King Vidor
- Based on: Wild Oranges; 1919 novel by Joseph Hergesheimer
- Starring: Virginia Valli
- Cinematography: John W. Boyle
- Music by: Vivek Maddala
- Production company: Goldwyn Pictures
- Distributed by: Goldwyn-Cosmopolitan
- Release date: January 20, 1924
- Running time: 70 minutes
- Country: United States
- Language: Silent (English intertitles)

Wild Oranges is a 1924 American silent drama film directed by King Vidor, adapted from a story by Joseph Hergesheimer. On January 12, 2010, the film had its first home video release, on the Warner Archive DVD series.

== Plot ==
When John Woolfolk's wife dies in an accident, he vows not to open himself to future emotional harm. With a shipmate, Paul Halvard, he begins sailing around the world, coming to anchor near an isolated, dilapidated mansion on the Southern coast, inhabited by a young woman, Nellie Stope, and her grandfather, Litchfield, who lives in fearful seclusion after his experiences in the Civil War. The one other inhabitant is a brutish "servant," Iscah Nicholas, who terrorizes the other two and is later revealed to be an escaped convict and "homicidal maniac."

Nicholas, a "man-child," lusts after Nellie and harasses her, placing her on a stump in the alligator-infested swamp until she agrees to kiss him, but he is momentarily satisfied with a peck on the cheek. Woolfolk comes to shore to ask Litchfield for water, noting the wild oranges that grow on the estate. Tasting one, he finds it is bitter, but on a second taste he enjoys the sweetness that the fruit reveals. He notices Nellie and the two talk together, but he still tries to keep emotionally distant from her.

The next day when Halvard fills a water cask, he is confronted by Nicholas, who smashes the barrel and knocks Halvard down. Woolfolk comes and warns Nicholas to leave the two men alone. Nellie asks to see Woolfolk's ship and he takes her out on the open sea, where she at first relishes the sense of freedom but is soon overwhelmed by the ocean's vastness. Returning to shore, Woolfolk is attacked by Nicholas, who has a knife, but Woolfolk disarms him.

Afraid of being drawn into a relationship with Nellie, Woolfolk has Halvard set to sea that evening as Nellie tearfully watches them from her window. Nicholas enters the house and pleads with Nellie to marry him, but she rejects him. Meanwhile, Woolfolk has a change of heart and has Halvard turn the ship back to shore. Finding Nellie, he tells her that he is in love with her and will take her and her grandfather away from their self-imposed confinement. The two agree to meet at the estate's dock that evening.

When Nicholas realizes that Nellie and Litchfield are planning to leave, he confronts them in their parlor, knocking Litchfield down and killing him. He takes Nellie to an upstairs bedroom where he ties her to the bed, demanding that she marry him. Woolfolk comes to the house, looking for Nellie and discovers Litchfield's body. Carefully climbing the stairs with a pistol drawn, he trips on a hole in the floor and drops his gun. Nicholas comes out of the bedroom, and the two engage in an extended fight on the landing and down the stairs as Nellie manages to free herself. Nicholas is temporarily distracted when he knocks over a lamp and starts a fire. Woolfolk and Nellie head to the wharf with Nicholas close behind. They manage to get on a rowboat to go to the ship, but Nicholas returns to the house, finds the gun that Woolfolk had dropped, and shoots at them across the water, wounding Halvard in the process.

While this fight has been going on, a dog who has been abused by Nicholas finally breaks free from his chains and attacks him, eventually killing him. Risking being shipwrecked on the sandbar that guards the coastal inlet, Woolfolk heads his ship for the open water. When Halvard becomes too weak to steer the ship, Nellie takes the wheel and the craft clears the bar. As they sail away, Nellie has lost her fear of the ocean's freedom, and Woolfolk has lost his fear of love.

== Cast ==
- Virginia Valli as Nellie Stope
- Frank Mayo as John Woolfolk
- Ford Sterling as Paul Halvard
- Nigel De Brulier as Lichtfield Stope
- Charles A. Post as Iscah Nicholas

== Production ==
Wild Oranges was partially filmed on location in the swamps near Savannah, Georgia.
