= Rod La Rocque =

American actor (1898–1969)

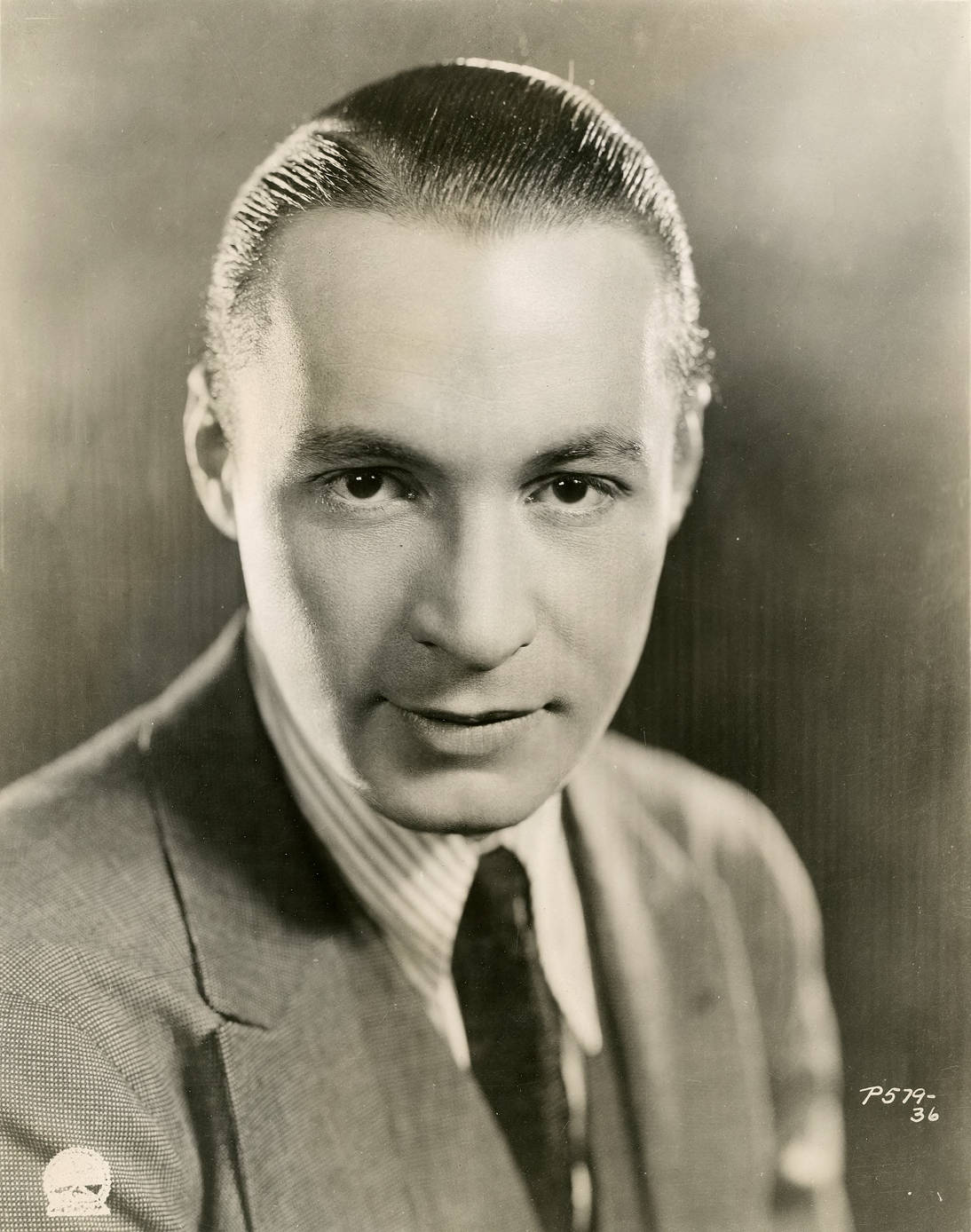
- La Rocque in 1925
- Born: Roderick Ross La Rocque; November 29, 1898; Chicago, Illinois, U.S.
- Died: October 15, 1969 (aged 70); Beverly Hills, California, U.S.
- Occupation: Actor
- Years active: 1914–1941
- Spouse: Vilma Bánky (m. 1927–1969)

Roderick Ross La Rocque (November 29, 1898 – October 15, 1969) was an American actor who appeared on stage and films.

== Career ==
La Rocque was born in Chicago, Illinois to Edmund La Rocque and Ann (née Rice) La Rocque. His father was of French-Canadian descent and his mother was of Irish descent. He began appearing in stock theater at the age of seven and eventually ended up at the Essanay Studios as a teenager in Chicago where he found steady work until the studios closed. He then moved to New York City and worked on the stage until he was noticed by Samuel Goldwyn who took him to Hollywood. Over the next two decades, he appeared in films and made the transition to sound films.

He retired from movies in 1941 and became a real estate broker.

== Personal life ==
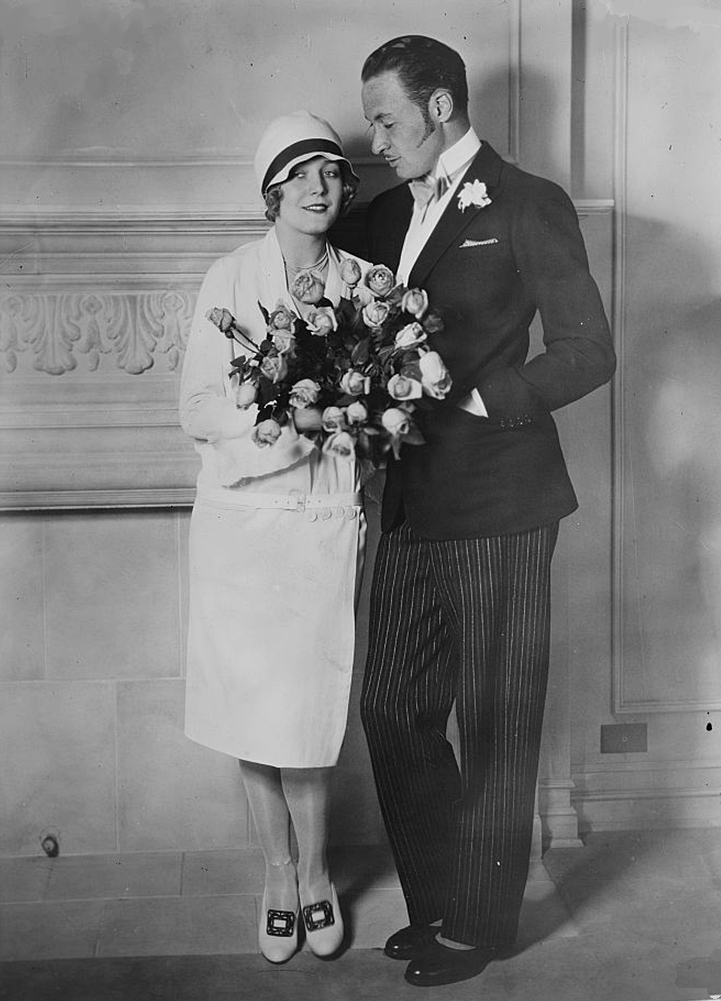
La Rocque and Vilma Bánky, 1927

In 1927, he married Hungarian actress Vilma Bánky in a lavish, highly publicized wedding. They were married until his death in 1969. The couple had no children.

== Legacy ==
For his contribution to the film industry, La Rocque was awarded a star on the Hollywood Walk of Fame.

== Partial filmography ==
| Year | Title | Role | Notes |
|---|---|---|---|
| 1914 | The Showman | Minor Role | Uncredited |
| 1915 | The Alster Case | Allen Longstreet | |
| 1916 | The Little Shepherd of Bargain Row | | |
| 1916 | The Prince of Graustark | | |
| 1917 | Efficiency Edgar's Courtship | Wimple | |
| 1917 | Filling His Own Shoes | Dick Downing | |
| 1917 | The Dream Doll | Her Sweetheart | |
| 1917 | Sadie Goes to Heaven | Coal Heaver | |
| 1918 | Uneasy Money | Johnny Gates | |
| 1918 | Ruggles of Red Gap | Belknap Jackson | |
| 1918 | Let's Get a Divorce | Chauffeur | |
| 1918 | The Venus Model | Paul Braddock | |
| 1918 | Money Mad | William Gavin Jr. | |
| 1918 | Hidden Fires | George Landis | |
| 1918 | A Perfect 36 | O.P. Dildock | |
| 1918 | A Perfect Lady | Bob Griswold | |
| 1919 | Love and the Woman | Walter Pemberton | |
| 1919 | The Trap | Doc Sloan - the Blackmailer | |
| 1919 | Miss Crusoe | Harold Vance | |
| 1919 | Easy to Get | Dick Elliott | |
| 1920 | The Stolen Kiss | Dudley Hamilt | |
| 1920 | The Garter Girl | Arthur Lyle | |
| 1920 | The Common Sin | Hugh Stanton | |
| 1920 | Life | Tom Burnett | |
| 1920 | The Discarded Woman | Sam Radburn - Gold Digger | |
| 1921 | Paying the Piper | Larry Grahame | |
| 1921 | Suspicious Wives | Bob Standing | |
| 1922 | Slim Shoulders | Richard Langden | |
| 1922 | What's Wrong with the Women? | Jack Lee | |
| 1922 | A Woman's Woman | Dean Laddbarry | |
| 1922 | Notoriety | Arthur Beal | |
| 1922 | The Challenge | Stanley Roberts | |
| 1923 | Jazzmania | Jerry Langdon | |
| 1923 | The French Doll | Pedro Carrova | |
| 1923 | The Ten Commandments | Dan McTavish - Her Son | |
| 1923 | Don't Call It Love | Patrick Delaney | |
| 1924 | Phantom Justice | Kingsley | |
| 1924 | A Society Scandal | Daniel Farr | |
| 1924 | Triumph | King Garnet | |
| 1924 | Code of the Sea | Bruce McDow | |
| 1924 | Feet of Clay | Kerry Harlan | |
| 1924 | Forbidden Paradise | Capt. Alexei Czerny | |
| 1925 | The Golden Bed | Admah Holtz | |
| 1925 | Night Life of New York | Ronald Bentley | |
| 1925 | Wild, Wild Susan | Tod Waterbury | |
| 1925 | The Coming of Amos | Amos Burden | |
| 1925 | Braveheart | Braveheart | |
| 1925 | Red Dice | Alan Beckwith | |
| 1926 | Bachelor Brides | Percy Ashfield - Earl of Duncraggan | |
| 1926 | Gigolo | Gideon Gory | |
| 1926 | Cruise of the Jasper B | Jerry Cleggett | |
| 1927 | Resurrection | Prince Dimitry Ivanitch Nekhludov | |
| 1927 | The Fighting Eagle | Etienne Gerard | |
| 1928 | Stand and Deliver | Roger Norman | |
| 1928 | Hold 'Em Yale | Jaime Emmanuel Alvarado Montez | |
| 1928 | Captain Swagger | Captain Swagger / Hugh Drummond | |
| 1928 | Show People | Rod La Rocque | Uncredited |
| 1928 | Love Over Night | Richard Hill | |
| 1929 | The One Woman Idea | Prince Ahmed | |
| 1929 | The Man and the Moment | Michael Towne | |
| 1929 | Our Modern Maidens | Abbott | |
| 1929 | The Delightful Rogue | Lastro | |
| 1929 | The Locked Door | Frank Devereaux | |
| 1930 | Beau Bandit | Montero | Preserved Library of Congress |
| 1930 | One Romantic Night | Prince Albert | |
| 1930 | Let Us Be Gay | Bob Brown | |
| 1933 | SOS Iceberg | Dr. Carl Lawrence | English-language version of SOS Eisberg with Leni Riefenstahl |
| 1935 | Mystery Woman | Jacques Benoit | |
| 1935 | Hi, Gaucho! | Escurra, aka Captain Garcia | |
| 1935 | Frisco Waterfront | Dan Elliott | |
| 1936 | Taming the Wild | Dick Clayton | |
| 1936 | The Preview Murder Mystery | Neil DuBeck / Joe Walker | |
| 1936 | Till We Meet Again | Carl Schrottle | |
| 1936 | The Drag-Net | Lawrence Thomas Jr. | |
| 1937 | Clothes and the Woman | Eric Thrale | |
| 1937 | The Shadow Strikes | Lamont Granston | |
| 1938 | International Crime | Lamont Cranston | |
| 1939 | The Hunchback of Notre Dame | Phillippe | |
| 1940 | Beyond Tomorrow | Phil Hubert | |
| 1940 | Dr. Christian Meets the Women | Prof. Kenneth Parker | |
| 1941 | Dark Streets of Cairo | Inspector Joachim | |
| 1941 | Meet John Doe | Ted Sheldon | Final film role |
