= One Wonderful Night (1914 film) =

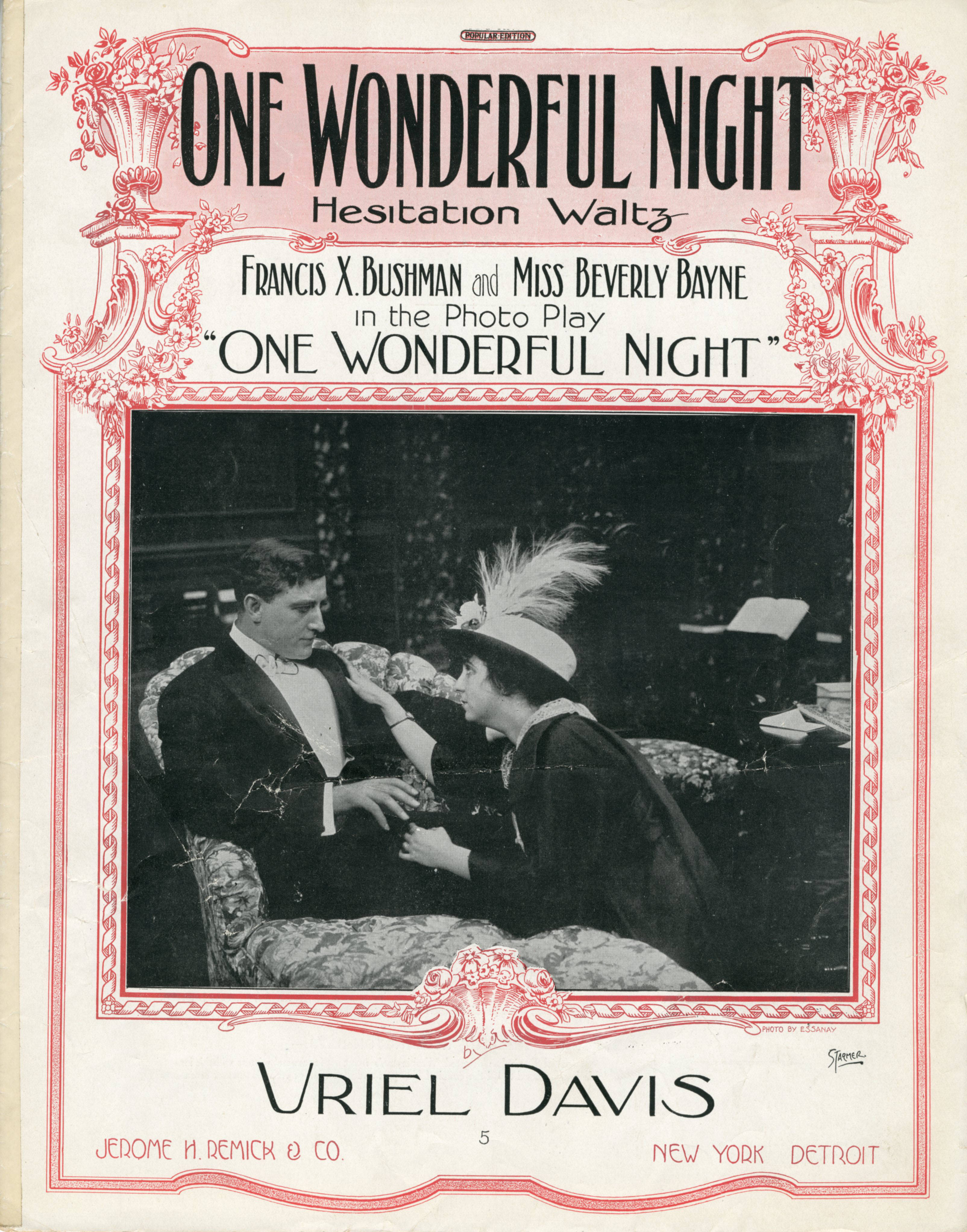
- Sheet music cover
- Directed by: E. H. Calvert
- Written by: Louis Tracy
- Based on: his novel One Wonderful Night
- Starring: Francis X. Bushman
- Cinematography: Jackson J. Rose
- Production company: Essanay Studios
- Distributed by: General Film Company
- Release date: July 18, 1914
- Running time: 4 reels
- Country: United States
- Language: Silent (English intertitles)

One Wonderful Night is a lost 1914 American silent mystery drama film starring Francis X. Bushman and Beverly Bayne, at the time a romantic screen couple. It was produced by the Chicago-based Essanay Studios.

The same story was later filmed in 1922 at Universal with Herbert Rawlinson.

== Cast ==
- Francis X. Bushman as John Delancey Curtis
- Beverly Bayne as Lady Hermione
- John Cossar as Horace P. Curtis
- Helen Dunbar as Mrs. Horace P. Curtis
- Lillian Drew as Marcelle
- Howard Watrous as Henry R. Hunter
- Thomas Commerford as The Earl of Vallefort
- Rapley Holmes as Count Vassilan
- Leo White as Jean de Curtois
- E. J. Babille as Antonie Lamotte (credited as Edward Babille)
- Charles Hitchcock as Gregory Martiny
- Robert Bolder as Mr. Schmidt
- M.C. Von Betz as Ferdinand Rossi

== Reception ==
Motion Picture News reviewer C.J. Verhalen felt very positive about the film, calling it "something extraordinary." The reviewer said Francis X. Bushman's acting was some of his best, the production was "in harmony with the story," and praised the story as being "interesting throughout."
