= Sybil Carmen =

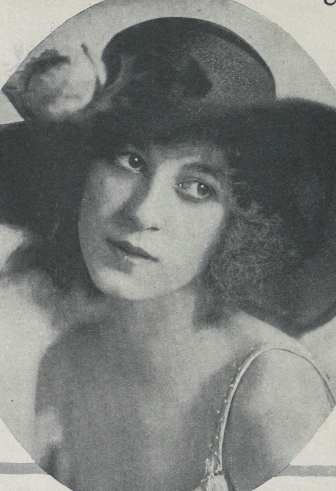
- Sybil Carmen, from a 1916 publication
- Born: Carmen Regina Attkisson; December 23, 1896; Parkersburg, West Virginia, U.S.
- Died: April 14, 1929 (aged 32); Paris, French Third Republic
- Occupation(s): Actress, dancer, Ziegfeld girl
- Spouse: Maurice Sydney Revnes (m. 1919)
- Children: 2

Carmen Regina Revnes (née Attkisson; December 23, 1896 — April 14, 1929), known professionally as Sybil Carmen, was an American actress, dancer, and Ziegfeld girl.

== Early life ==
Sybil Carmen was born Carmen Regina Attkisson on December 23, 1896 in Parkersburg, West Virginia, and was raised in Pittsburgh, Pennsylvania, the daughter of Russell Attkisson and Agnes Gertrude Attkisson (née Haggerty, 1875–1952). She had two brothers, Charles and Edgar, and one sister, Dagmar. She moved to New York as a young woman to pursue a career as a dancer.

== Career ==
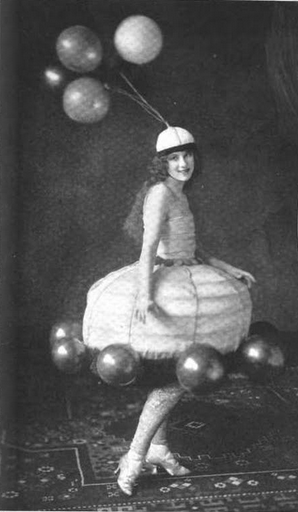
Sybil Carmen in her "balloon girl" costume for the Ziegfeld Midnight Frolic, from a 1916 publication.

Carmen appeared on Broadway in two productions by Florenz Ziegfeld Jr. She was a principal performer in the 1915 Ziegfeld Midnight Frolic as a "balloon girl", sharing the bill with The Dolly Sisters, Will Rogers, Eddie Cantor, and Olive Thomas; and she returned as a principal player in the Ziegfeld Girls of 1920, on a bill with Fanny Brice, W. C. Fields, and Lillian Lorraine. In 1918 she was in a similar rooftop revue show at the Century Grove. She acted in two silent films, A Romance of the Underworld (1918) and Experience (1921), both of which are now lost.

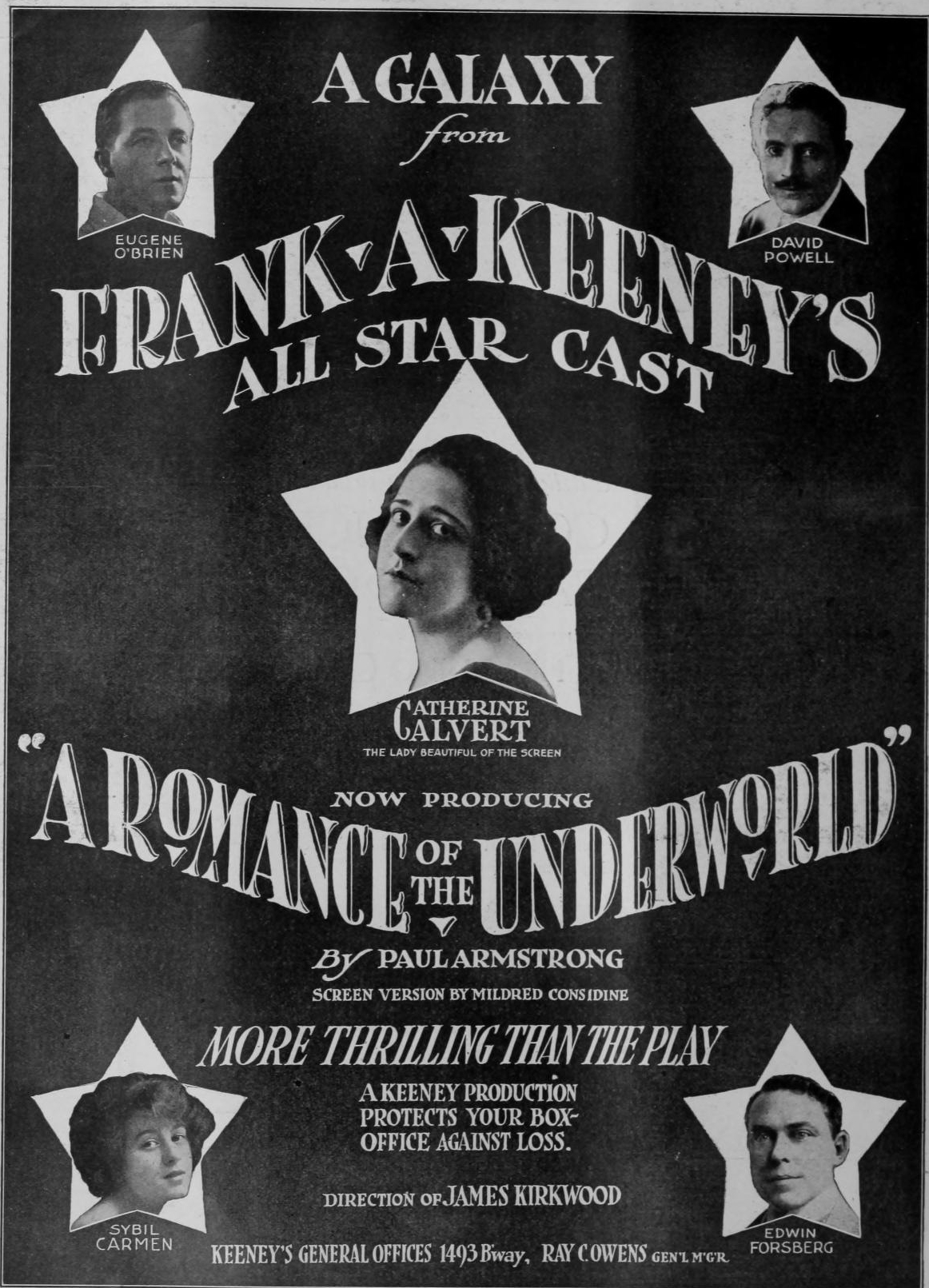
Poster for Romance of the Underworld (1918); Sybil Carmen's photograph is in the lower left star

== Personal life ==
Sybil Carmen married writer and film executive Maurice Sydney Revnes on September 8, 1919; in 1926 they moved to France where he represented Pathé Studios. They had two children, a son Richard (1923–1990) and a daughter Carmen (born 1921). On April 14, 1929 at 7:30 P.M., Sybil Carmen died of pneumonia at 8 Rue Quentin-Bauchart in Paris. She was cremated on April 20, 1929, and her ashes were scattered in New York City.
