= The Street of Illusion =

1928 film

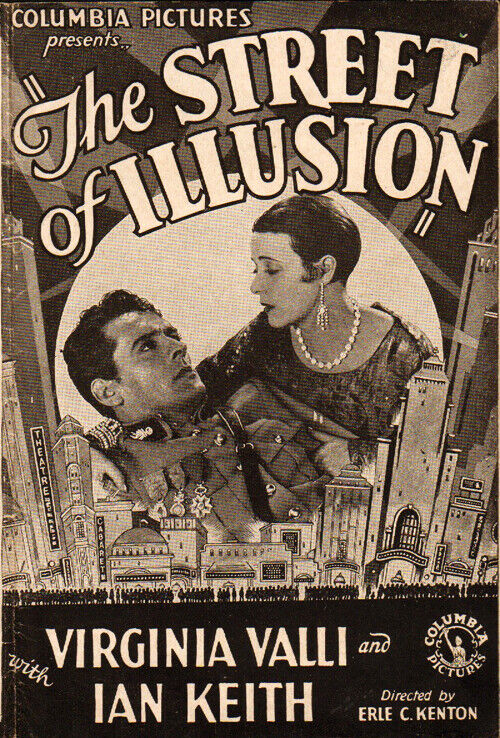
- Directed by: Erle C. Kenton
- Written by: Mort Blumenstock; Dorothy Howell; Channing Pollock; Harvey F. Thew
- Produced by: Harry Cohn
- Starring: Virginia Valli; Ian Keith; Harry Myers
- Cinematography: Joseph Walker
- Edited by: Frank Atkinson
- Production company: Columbia Pictures
- Distributed by: Columbia Pictures
- Release date: September 3, 1928
- Running time: 65 minutes
- Country: United States
- Language: Silent (English intertitles)

The Street of Illusion is a 1928 American silent drama film directed by Erle C. Kenton and starring Virginia Valli, Ian Keith, and Harry Myers.

== Cast ==
- Virginia Valli as Sylvia Thurston
- Ian Keith as Edwin Booth Benton
- Harry Myers as Lew Fielding
- Kenneth Thomson as Curtis Drake

== Preservation ==
With no prints of The Street of Illusion located in any film archives, it is a lost film.

== Bibliography ==
- Langman, Larry. American Film Cycles: The Silent Era. Greenwood Publishing, 1998.
