= Night Life in Reno =

1931 film

- Directed by: Raymond Cannon
- Written by: Gloria Stiratt (story); Arthur Hoerl (scenario)
- Starring: See below
- Cinematography: M.A. Anderson; Mike Santacrosse
- Edited by: W. Donn Hayes; Martha Dresback
- Release date: November 2, 1931
- Running time: 58 minutes
- Country: United States
- Language: English

Night Life in Reno is a 1931 American pre-Code film directed by actor/screenwriter Raymond Cannon.

== Cast ==
- Virginia Valli as June Wyatt
- Jameson Thomas as John Wyatt
- Dorothy Christy as Gwen Maynard
- Arthur Housman as Roy Carlton
- Dixie Lee as Dorothy
- Clarence Wilson as Adrian Garrett
- Carmelita Geraghty as Rita Carlton
