= The Man Who Found Himself (1925 film) =

1925 film

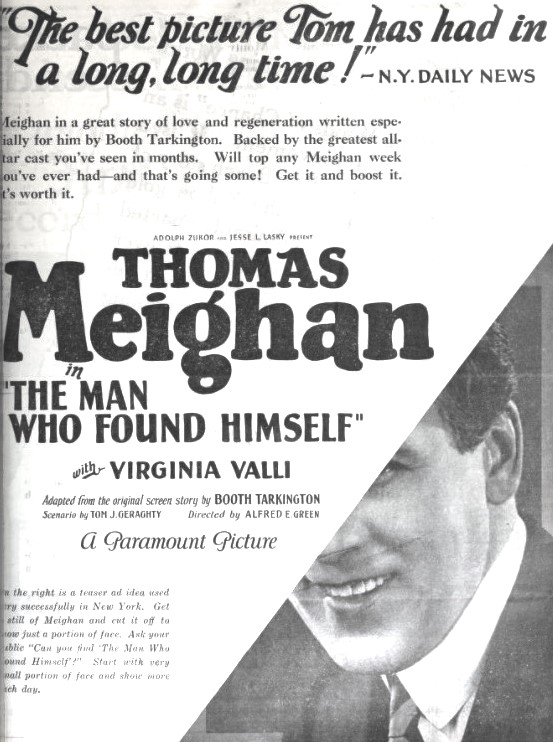
- Advertisement
- Directed by: Alfred E. Green
- Screenplay by: Thomas J. Geraghty
- Story by: Booth Tarkington
- Produced by: Jesse L. Lasky; Adolph Zukor
- Starring: Thomas Meighan; Virginia Valli; Frank Morgan; Ralph Morgan; Charles A. Stevenson; Julia Hoyt
- Cinematography: Alvin Wyckoff
- Production company: Famous Players–Lasky Corporation
- Distributed by: Paramount Pictures
- Release date: August 23, 1925
- Running time: 70 minutes
- Country: United States
- Language: Silent (English intertitles)

The Man Who Found Himself is a 1925 American silent drama film directed by Alfred E. Green and written by Thomas J. Geraghty based upon a story by Booth Tarkington. The film stars Thomas Meighan, Virginia Valli, Frank Morgan, Ralph Morgan, Charles A. Stevenson, and Julia Hoyt. The film was released on August 23, 1925, by Paramount Pictures.

== Plot summary ==
Tom and Edwin Macauley are directors at a bank owned by their father. Edwin uses the banks funds to speculate, and plans to incriminate Tom with the help of banker Lon Morris. Tom is sent to prison, where he becomes a Trusty. He breaks out when he learns that Morris is set to marry his fiancée. Nora Brooks. He confronts, then attacks Morris, before returning to prison. Tom's father dies, and Tom is released from prison. With the help of friends he made in prison, Tom breaks into his father's bank, which is now controlled by Morris. He steals money, plants it in Morris' house, and notifies the bank examiners. Morris, who was already embezzling bank funds, goes back to the bank to get more money. He is caught and killed by a watchman before he can escape. Tom reunites with Nora, and they marry.

== Cast ==
- Thomas Meighan as Tom Macauley
- Virginia Valli as Nora Brooks
- Frank Morgan as Lon Morris
- Ralph Morgan as Edwin Macauley Jr.
- Charles A. Stevenson as Edwin Macauley Sr.
- Julia Hoyt as Evelyn Corning
- Lynn Fontanne as Mrs. Macauley Jr.
- Mildred Ryan as Polly Brooks
- Hugh Cameron as Hoboken Williams
- Victor Moore as Humpty Dumpty Smith
- Russell Griffin as Tom Macauley Jr.
- Norman Trevor as Commodore Branding
- John Harrington as Warden

== Preservation ==
With no prints of The Man Who Found Himself located in any film archives, it is a lost film.
