= Gerda Holmes =

American actress (1891–1943)

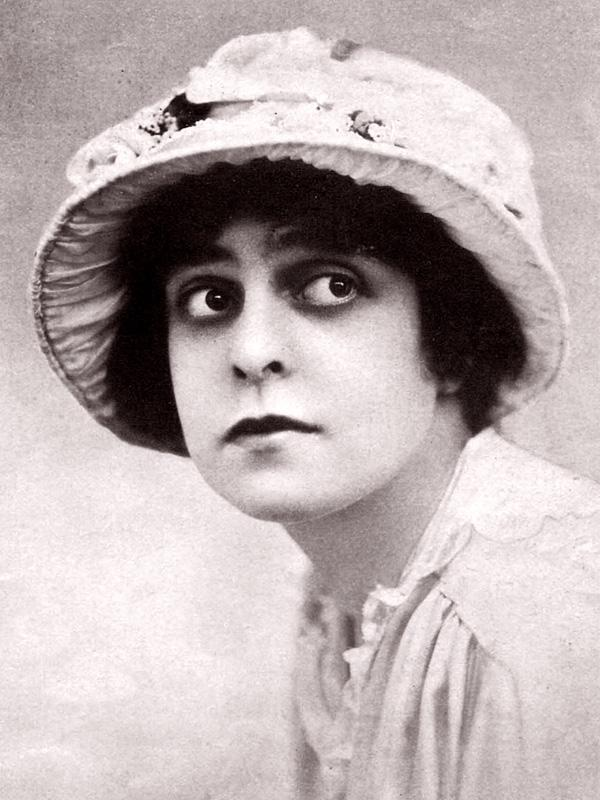

Gerda Holmes, née Gerda Helen Elfrida Henius (April 2, 1891 – October 11, 1943), was an actress during the silent film era and in theater. She had major roles in numerous films including The Fable of Elvira and Farina and the Meal Ticket (1915) and The Iron Ring (1917) with Arthur Ashley.

Born in Chicago, Illinois, Holmes was Danish. Her grandfather managed the Royal Danish Theatre in Copenhagen for more than two decades, and her father was a doctor in Chicago. She studied music in Denmark and began performing on stage there at about age 14. Her first marriage was to Rapley Holmes.

The cover of the December 1916 issue of The Masses magazine featured a "stylish and very modern" portrait of Holmes by Frank Walts.

== Selected filmography ==
- The Family Honor (1917)

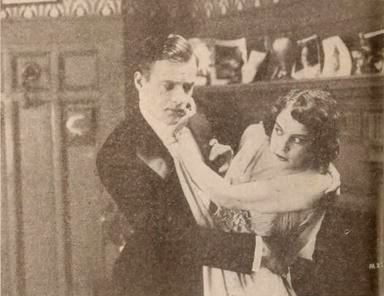
With Arthur Ashley in The Iron Ring (1917)

List of acting performances in feature films
Year	Title	Role	Notes	Source
1913	Robin Hood	Marian	Silent film starring William Russell	
1915	The Ambition of the Baron			
1915	The Fable of Elvira and Farina and the Meal Ticket			
1916	The Gilded Cage	Queen Vesta		
1916	Friday the 13th	Beulah Sands		
1916	His One Big Chance		Starring Willard Mack and Clara Whipple	
1916	Husband and Wife		Starring Ethel Clayton and Holbrook Blinn	
1916	The Chain Invisible	Anne Dalton		
1917	The Man Who Forgot	The woman, also known as Mary Leslie		
1917	The Iron Ring	Bess Hulette		
1917	A Hungry Heart	Louis Bregard		
