= Experience (1921 film) =

1921 film by George Fitzmaurice

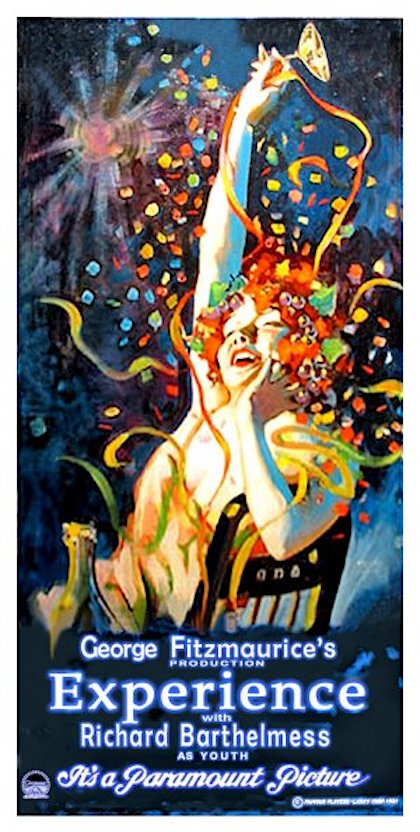
- 1921 theatrical poster
- Directed by: George Fitzmaurice
- Written by: Waldemar Young (scenario)
- Based on: Experience by George V. Hobart
- Produced by: Adolph Zukor; Jesse L. Lasky
- Starring: Richard Barthelmess; Lilyan Tashman; Reginald Denny; Marjorie Daw
- Cinematography: Arthur C. Miller
- Distributed by: Paramount Pictures
- Release date: October 23, 1921
- Running time: 70 minutes
- Country: United States
- Language: Silent (English intertitles)

Experience is a 1921 American silent morality drama film produced by Famous Players–Lasky and distributed by Paramount Pictures. The allegorical film was directed by George Fitzmaurice and starred Richard Barthelmess. It was based on George V. Hobart's successful 1914 Broadway play of the same name. It was the film debut of Lilyan Tashman.

Experience is presumed to be a lost film.

== Plot ==
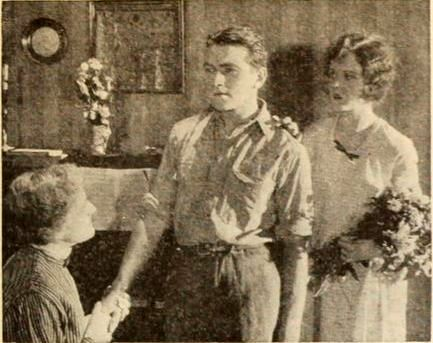
Youth (Richard Barthelmess) hears Ambition's call and leaves his mother (Kate Bruce) and Love (Marjorie Daw) to seek his fortune.

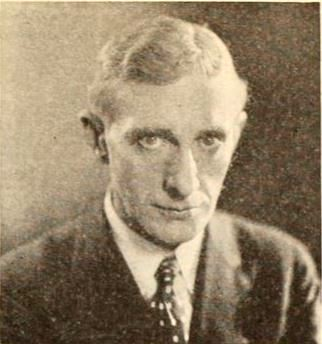
Experience (John Miltern) is to teach Youth many things about life.

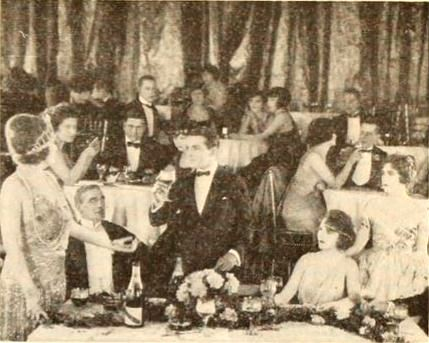
Youth encounters Pleasure, Beauty, and Wealth. He asks Opportunity to wait for him. But Opportunity cannot!

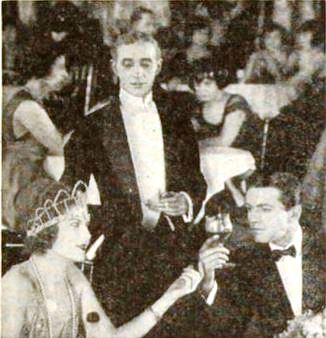
Youth is enthralled by Pleasure (Lilyan Tashman) and, while Experience looks on, is welcomed into the gay party.

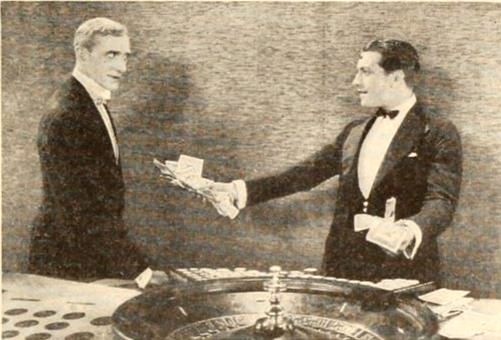
Youth's funds run low and Chance directs him to a gambling house where he can double his money. At first he wins, but later luck leaves him.

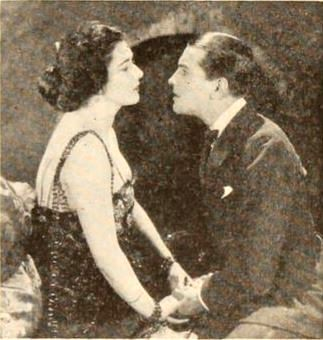
Temptation (Nita Naldi) fascinates Youth. She intercepts a letter telling Youth of his mother's death.

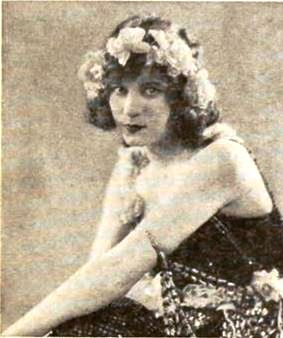
Experience meanwhile teaches Youth to know Excitement (Sibyl Carmen).

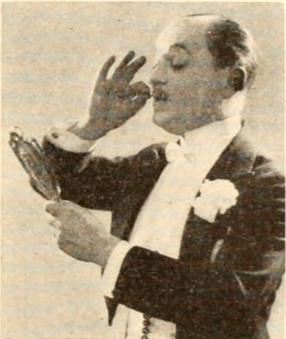
Smirking Conceit (Robert Schable) with his ever-present mirror.

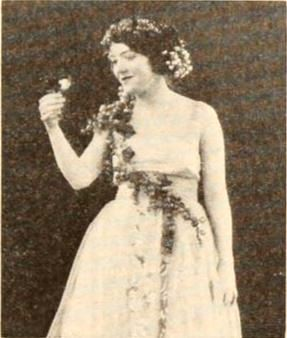
And Intoxication (an all-too-present companion) (Helen Ray).

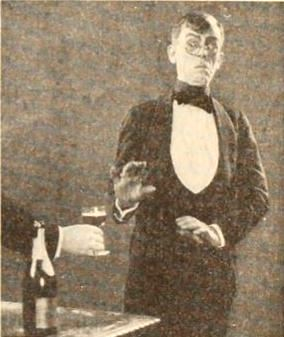
And - eventually - the sanctimonious Prohibition (Leslie King).

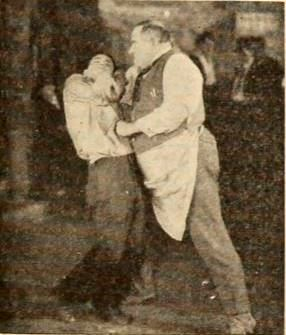
Finally, accused of theft, Youth is ejected to the gutter.

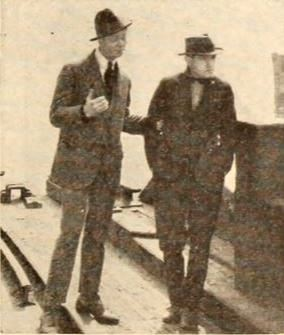
Crime (Louis Wolheim) seeks to persuade Youth to rob Wealth's house.

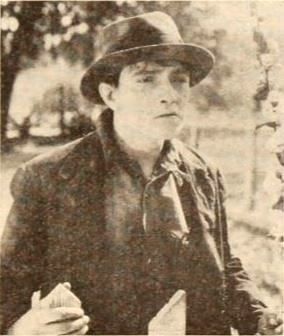
But Youth returns home, where Love and Hope await.

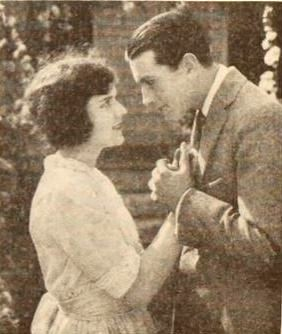
With Love by his side, Youth is enriched by Experience.

== Cast ==
- Richard Barthelmess as Youth
- Reginald Denny (unidentified role)
- John Miltern as Experience
- Marjorie Daw as Love
- E. J. Ratcliffe as Ambition
- Betty Carpenter as Hope
- Kate Bruce as Mother
- Lilyan Tashman as Pleasure
- R. Senior as Opportunity
- Joseph W. Smiley as Chance
- Fred Hadley as Tout
- Harry J. Lane as Despair
- Helen Ray as Intoxication
- Jed Prouty as Good Nature
- Barney Furey as Poverty
- Charles A. Stevenson as Wealth
- Edna Wheaton as Beauty
- Yvonne Routon as Fashion
- Ned Hay as Sport
- Sibyl Carmen as Excitement
- Robert Schable as Conceit
- Nita Naldi as Temptation
- Frank Evans as Work
- Frank McCormack as Delusion
- Louis Wolheim as Crime
- Agnes Marc as Habit
- Mrs. Gallagher as Degradation
- Florence Flinn as Frailty
- Mac Barnes as Makeshift
- Leslie King as Gloom
- Leslie Banks (unidentified role)

== Production ==
Some of the minor roles were filled through contests held in various cities, which gave advance publicity for the film. For example, Edna Wheaton was selected for the role of "Beauty" through a contest run by the New York Daily News.

== See also ==
- List of lost films
- Everywoman (1919)
