= The Fable of Elvira and Farina and the Meal Ticket =

- Directed by: Richard Foster Baker
- Written by: George Ade
- Starring: Lillian Drew; Gloria Swanson
- Distributed by: Essanay Studios
- Release date: February 3, 1915
- Running time: 3 reels
- Country: United States
- Languages: Silent; English intertitles

The Fable of Elvira and Farina and the Meal Ticket is a 1915 silent film directed by Richard Foster Baker. Gloria Swanson made her first credited appearance in this film as Farina.

== Cast ==
- Lillian Drew - Elvira
- Gloria Swanson - Farina, Elvira's Daughter (as Gloria Mae Swanson)
- Rapley Holmes - The Meal Ticket
- Gerda Holmes
