= The Price of Pleasure =

1925 film

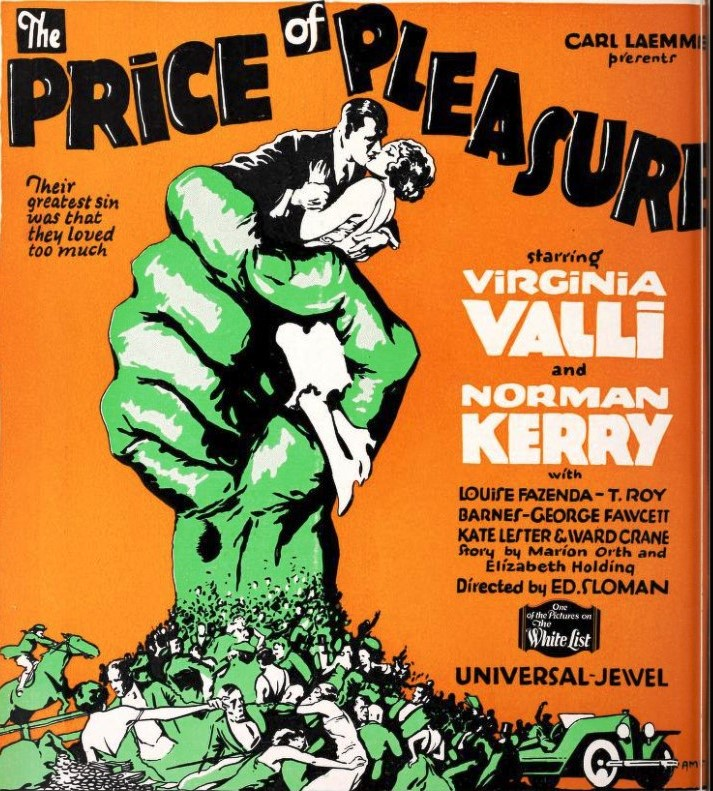
- Advertisement for the film
- Directed by: Edward Sloman
- Written by: J.G. Hawks; Raymond L. Schrock
- Story by: Elisabeth Sanxay Holding; Marion Orth
- Produced by: Carl Laemmle
- Starring: Virginia Valli; Norman Kerry; Louise Fazenda
- Cinematography: John Stumar
- Production company: Universal Pictures
- Distributed by: Universal Pictures
- Release date: March 15, 1925
- Running time: 70 minutes
- Country: United States
- Language: Silent (English intertitles)

The Price of Pleasure is a 1925 American silent drama film directed by Edward Sloman and starring Virginia Valli, Norman Kerry, and Louise Fazenda.

== Plot ==
As described in a film magazine, Garry Schuyler (Kerry), a young millionaire, is charmed by Linnie Randall (Valli), a department store clerk whom he hears sighing for at least one week of real pleasure. He takes her up on that, just for a lark. From then on her life is one round of delights after another. He takes her to his palatial home, now empty because his mother and sister are out of town. At the end of the week, the very evening when she is to return to her dreary room, he takes pity on her, realizing that now her unhappiness is to be greater than ever. He proposes marriage and saves her feelings. When they return to his home, his mother (Lester) and Grace (Astaire), his sister, unexpectedly return, unknown to the newlyweds. Linnie goes upstairs and is ordered out of the room by Garry's sister, who thinks she is one of the maids. Then it is that the mother and daughter make life miserable for Linnie. One night she dashes away from the table, into the blinding night rain. Garry follows and accidentally runs her down in his car. Early in the morning, believing she is dead, he falls in a faint, and thereafter has brain fever. His people take him to Europe to recover and forget. Linnie has a child, and supports herself by doing fashionable dancing at a leading Broadway cabaret. Garry returns with his mother about a year later. A word from his faithful butler (Barrows), and he begins to stir about in search of his wife, whom he finds being attacked by her dancing partner. The latter proves to be a crook, whom the family lawyer had hired in order to get sufficient evidence so as to get a divorce for Garry without consulting him. A swift unravelling results as the pair is happily reunited.

== Cast ==
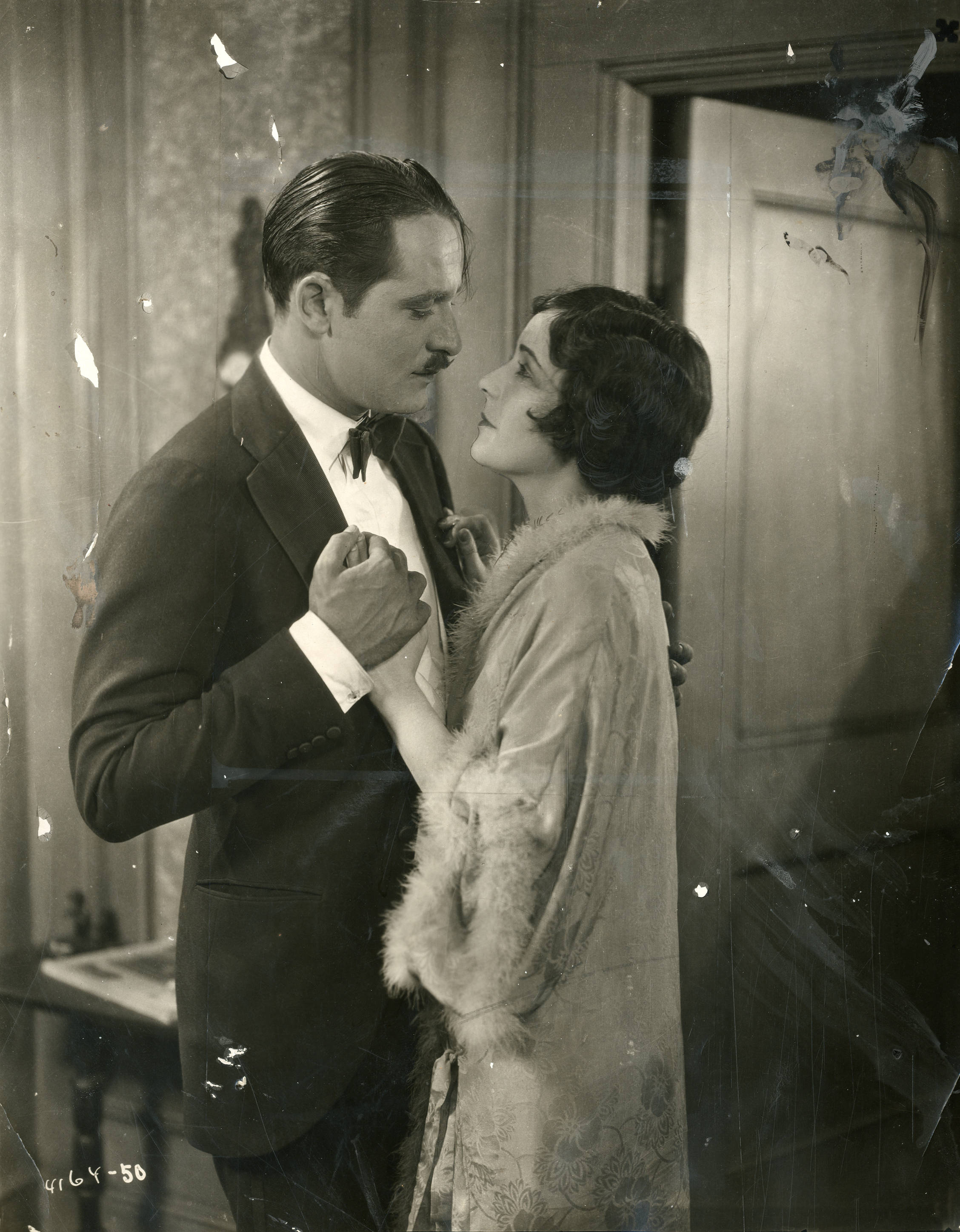
Still with Valli and Kerry

- Virginia Valli as Linnie Randall
- Norman Kerry as Garry Schuyler
- Louise Fazenda as Stella Kelly
- Kate Lester as Mrs. Schuyler
- George Fawcett as John Osborne
- T. Roy Barnes as Bill McGuffy
- James O. Barrows as Jenkins
- Marie Astaire as Grace Schuyler

== Preservation ==
With no prints of The Price of Pleasure located in any film archives, it is a lost film.

== Bibliography ==
- Munden, Kenneth White. The American Film Institute Catalog of Motion Pictures Produced in the United States, Part 1. University of California Press, 1997.
