= A Woman's Woman =

1922 silent film

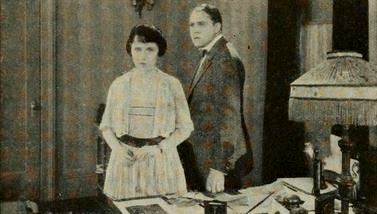
- Directed by: Charles Giblyn
- Written by: Nalbro Bartley (novel); Raymond L. Schrock
- Starring: Mary Alden; Dorothy Mackaill; Holmes Herbert
- Cinematography: Jacques Bizeul
- Production company: Albion Productions
- Distributed by: Allied Producers & Distributors Corporation
- Release date: September 24, 1922
- Running time: 80 minutes
- Country: United States
- Languages: Silent; English intertitles

A Woman's Woman is a 1922 American silent drama film directed by Charles Giblyn and starring Mary Alden, Dorothy Mackaill and Holmes Herbert.

== Cast ==
- Mary Alden as Densie Plummer
- Louise Lee as Harriet Plummer
- Dorothy Mackaill as Sally Plummer
- Holmes Herbert as John Plummer
- Albert Hackett as Kenneth Plummer
- Rod La Rocque as Dean Laddbarry
- Horace James as Sam Hippler
- Cleo Madison as Iris Starr
- Donald Hall as Rex Humberstone
- J. Barney Sherry as Senator James Gleason

== Preservation ==
In February 2021, A Woman's Woman was cited by the National Film Preservation Board on their Lost U.S. Silent Feature Films list and is therefore presumed lost.

== Bibliography ==
- Goble, Alan. The Complete Index to Literary Sources in Film. Walter de Gruyter, 1999.
