= Lawrence D'Orsay =

British actor (1853–1931)

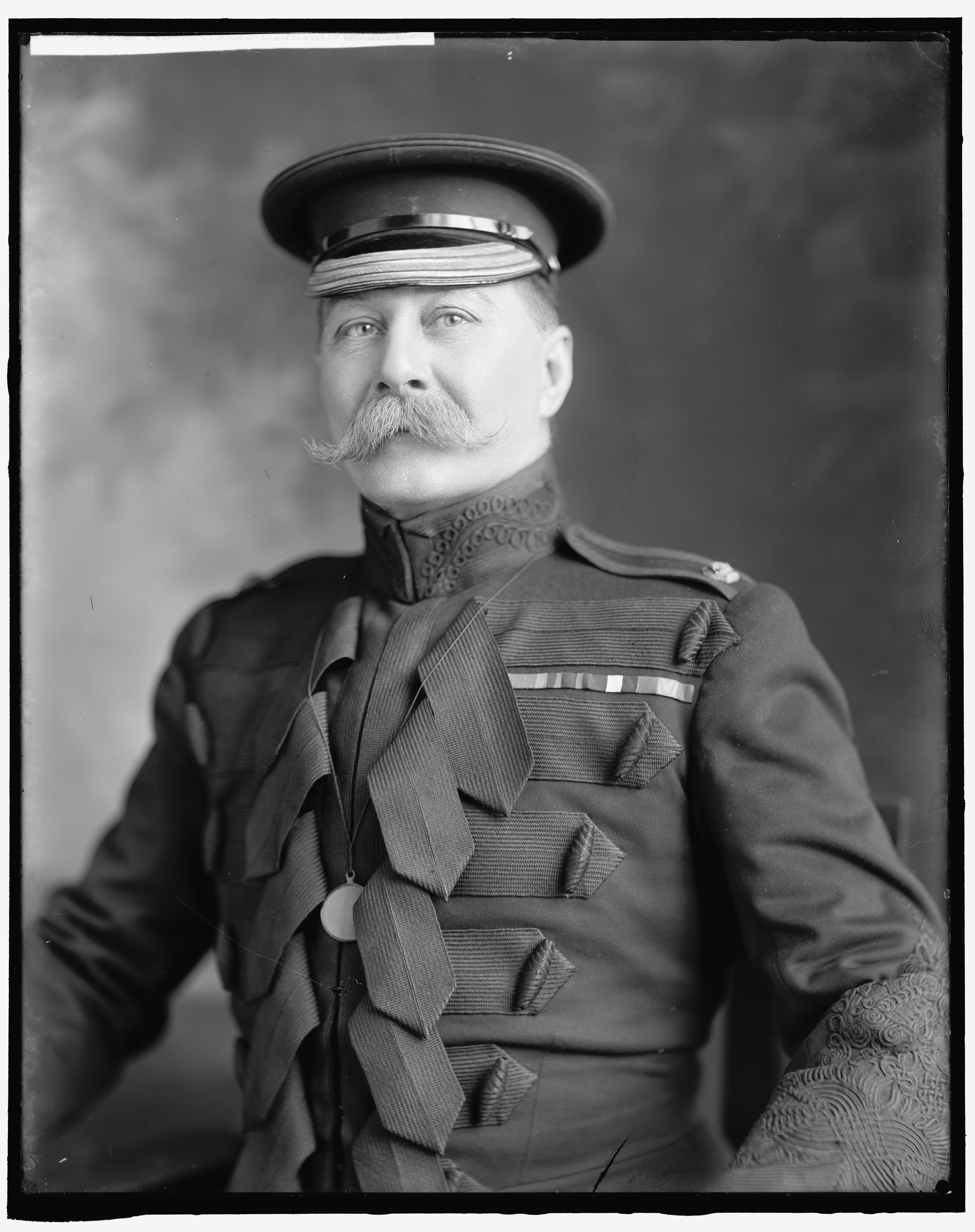
- From a play
- Born: Dorset William Lawrance; 19 August 1853; Peterborough, Northamptonshire, England
- Died: 13 September 1931 (aged 78); London, England
- Occupation: Actor
- Years active: 1877–1929
- Spouses: Marie Dagmar; Susan Rusholme

Lawrence D'Orsay (1853–1931); some sources (Lawrance D'Orsay), was a British born stage and film actor.

== Biography ==
He was born in 1853 as Dorset William Lawrance to solicitor John W. Lawrance. He was educated at Merchant Taylors' School and was intended to go into Law. Made his first appearance on the stage in 1877, he toured the English provinces for five years to 1882. Much work in London theatres. He went to New York City in 1884, making his first appearance at Haverley's Theatre on 6 October 1884. He started in silent films in 1912, making his last film in 1926.

In the theatre he played the type of servile Englishman remembered by later actors such as Arthur Treacher and Sebastian Cabot.

== Selected filmography ==
- Ruggles of Red Gap (1918)
- The Bond Boy (1923)
- His Children's Children (1923)
- The Side Show of Life (1924)
- Miss Bluebeard (1925)
- The Sorrows of Satan (1926)
