= The Escape (1928 film) =

1928 film

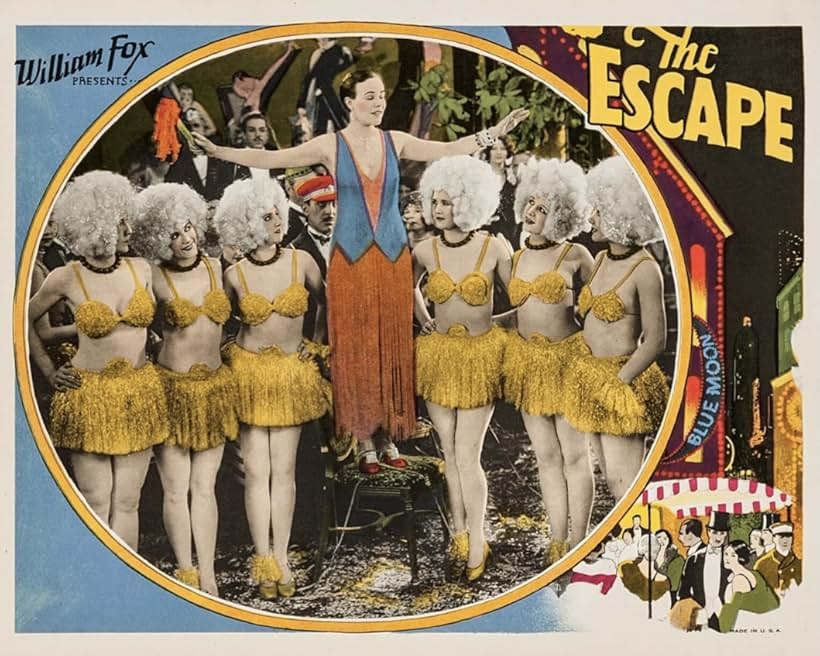
- Lobby card
- Directed by: Richard Rosson
- Screenplay by: Garrett Graham; Paul Schofield
- Based on: The Escape by Paul Armstrong
- Starring: William Russell; Virginia Valli; Nancy Drexel; George Meeker
- Cinematography: H. Kinley Martin
- Edited by: J. Logan Pearson; J. Edwin Robbins
- Production company: Fox Film Corporation
- Distributed by: Fox Film Corporation
- Release date: April 29, 1928
- Running time: 58 minutes
- Country: United States
- Language: Silent (English intertitles)

The Escape is a 1928 American silent drama film directed by Richard Rosson and written by Garrett Graham and Paul Schofield. It is based on the 1913 play The Escape by Paul Armstrong. The film stars William Russell, Virginia Valli, Nancy Drexel, George Meeker, William Demarest, and James Gordon. The film was released on April 29, 1928, by Fox Film Corporation.

== Cast ==
- William Russell as Jerry Magee
- Virginia Valli as May Joyce
- Nancy Drexel as Jennie Joyce
- George Meeker as Dr. Don Elliott
- William Demarest as Trigger Caswell
- James Gordon as Jim Joyce
