= The Bond Boy =

1922 film by Henry King

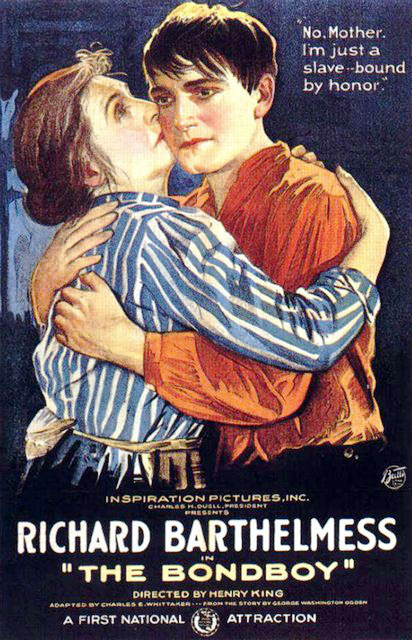
- Theatrical release poster
- Directed by: Henry King
- Written by: Charles E. Whittaker
- Based on: The Bond Boy by George Washington Ogden
- Produced by: Charles H. Duell; Inspiration Pictures
- Starring: Richard Barthelmess
- Cinematography: Roy Overbaugh
- Edited by: W. Duncan Mansfield
- Distributed by: Associated First National Pictures
- Release date: October 8, 1922
- Running time: 70 minutes
- Country: United States
- Languages: Silent film (English intertitles)

The Bond Boy is a lost 1922 American silent drama film directed by Henry King and starring Richard Barthelmess. It was produced by Barthelmess and Charles Duell and released through Associated First National Pictures.

== Cast ==
- Richard Barthelmess as Peter Newbolt/John Newbolt
- Charles Hill Mailes as Isom Chase
- Ned Sparks as Cyrus Morgan
- Lawrence D'Orsay as Colonel Price
- Bob Williamson as Lawyer Hammer (*Robert Williamson)
- Leslie King as District Attorney
- Jerry Sinclair as Sheriff
- Tom Maguire as Saul Greening (*as Thomas Maguire)
- Lucia Backus Seger as Mrs. Greening
- Virginia Magee as Alice Price
- Mary Alden as Mrs. Newboat
- Mary Thurman as Ollie Chase
