= Paid to Love =

1927 film

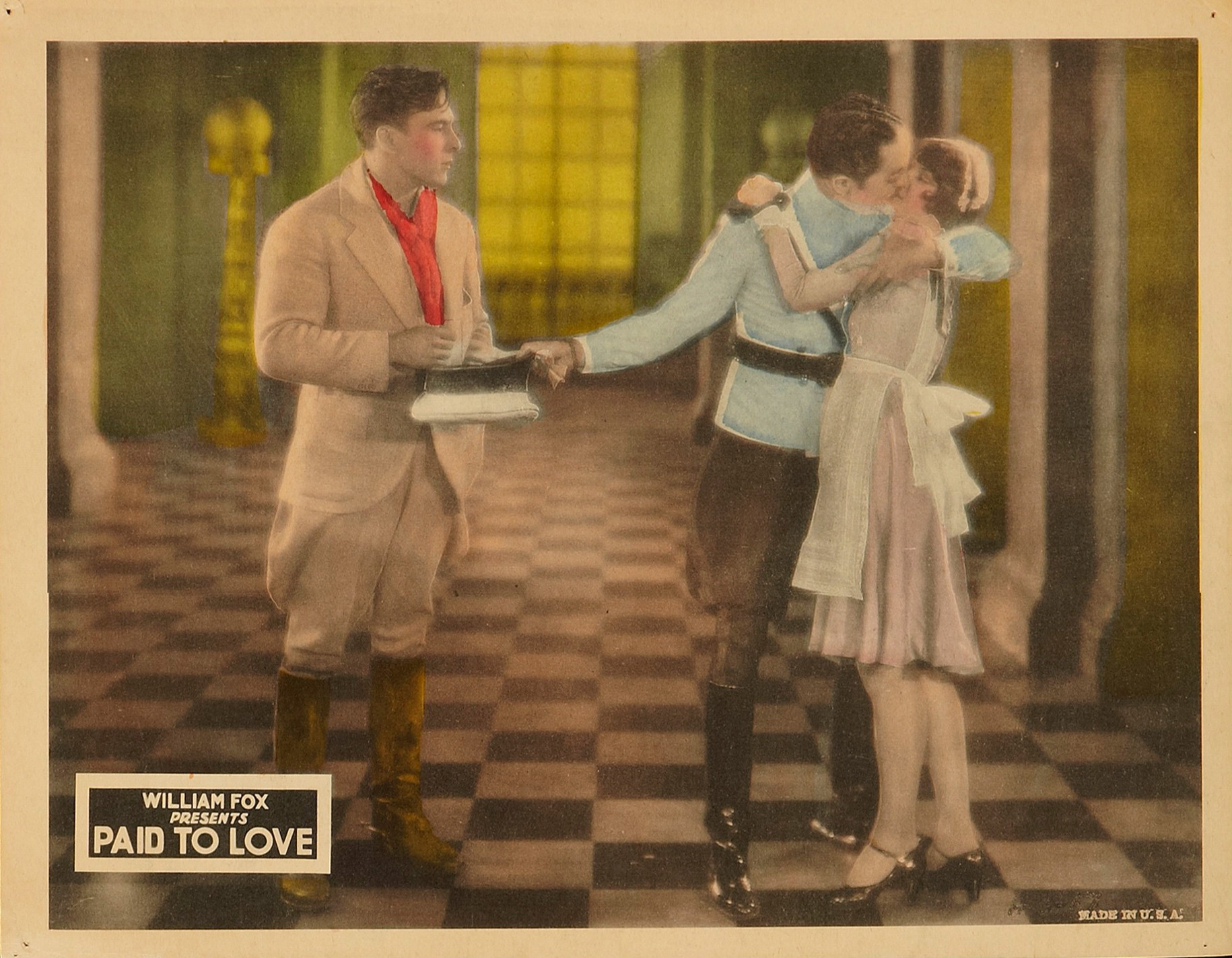
- Lobby card
- Directed by: Howard Hawks
- Screenplay by: Malcolm Stuart Boylan; William M. Conselman; Benjamin Glazer; Seton I. Miller
- Story by: Harry Carr
- Produced by: William Fox
- Starring: George O'Brien; Virginia Valli; J. Farrell MacDonald; William Powell; Thomas Jefferson; Hank Mann
- Cinematography: L. William O'Connell
- Edited by: Ralph Dixon
- Production company: Fox Film Corporation
- Distributed by: Fox Film Corporation
- Release date: July 23, 1927
- Running time: 76 minutes
- Country: United States
- Language: Silent (English intertitles)

Paid to Love is a 1927 American silent comedy film directed by Howard Hawks and written by Malcolm Stuart Boylan, William M. Conselman, Benjamin Glazer, and Seton I. Miller. The film stars George O'Brien, Virginia Valli, J. Farrell MacDonald, William Powell, Thomas Jefferson, and Hank Mann. The film was released on July 23, 1927, by Fox Film Corporation.

== Plot ==
The full film

== Cast ==
- George O'Brien as Crown Prince Michael
- Virginia Valli as Dolorès
- J. Farrell MacDonald as Peter Roberts
- William Powell as Prince Eric
- Thomas Jefferson as King
- Hank Mann as Servant
- Merta Sterling as Maid
- Henry Armetta as Valet
