= Wild, Wild Susan =

1925 film by A. Edward Sutherland

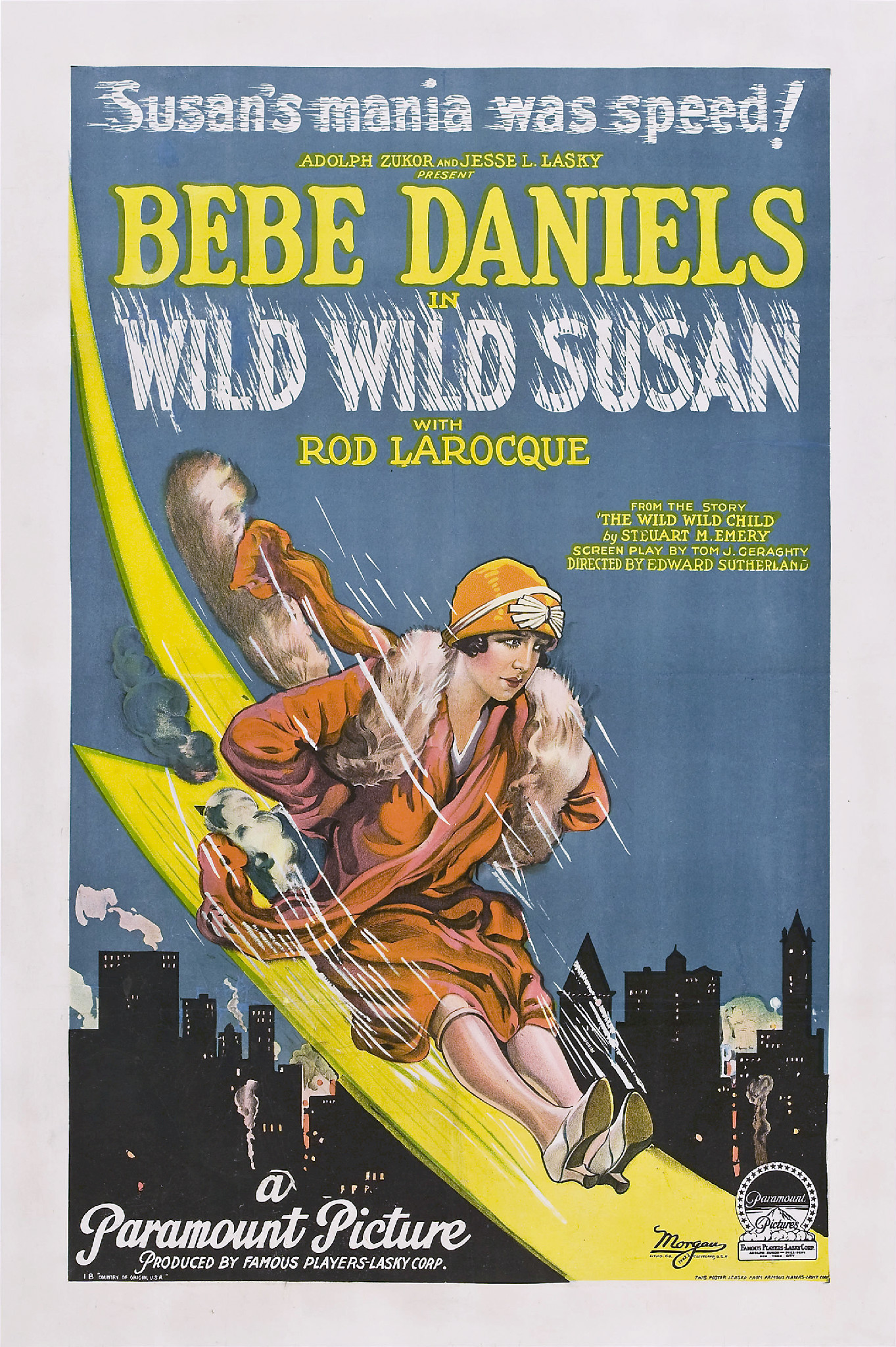
- Film poster
- Directed by: A. Edward Sutherland
- Written by: Thomas J. Geraghty (scenario)
- Story by: Stewart M. Emery
- Produced by: Adolph Zukor; Jesse Lasky
- Starring: Bebe Daniels; Rod La Rocque
- Cinematography: J. Roy Hunt
- Distributed by: Paramount Pictures
- Release date: September 7, 1925
- Running time: 60 minutes; 6 reels
- Country: United States
- Language: Silent (English intertitles)

Wild, Wild Susan is a 1925 American silent comedy film directed by A. Edward Sutherland and starring popular Bebe Daniels. Famous Players–Lasky produced and Paramount Pictures distributed.

== Cast ==
- Bebe Daniels as Susan Van Dusen
- Rod La Rocque as Tod Waterbury
- Henry Stephenson as Peter Van Dusen
- Jack Kane as Edgar
- Helen Holcombe as Emily Dutton
- Osgood Perkins as M. Crawford Duton
- Ivan F. Simpson as Malcolm
- Russell G. Medcraft as Eustace Waterbury
- Warren Cook as Chauncey Ames Waterbury
- Joseph W. Smiley as Parker (credited as Joseph Smiley)
- Mildred Ryan as Edgar's Sweetheart

== Preservation ==
With no prints of Wild, Wild Susan located in any film archives, it is a lost film.
