= The Christmas Carol =

1949 television special

- Directed by: Arthur Pierson
- Screenplay by: Arthur Pierson
- Based on: A Christmas Carol; 1843 novella by Charles Dickens
- Produced by: Bernard Ebert; Mike Stokey
- Starring: Vincent Price; Taylor Holmes; Patrick Whyte
- Narrated by: Vincent Price
- Cinematography: Meredith Merle Nicholson
- Edited by: Art Seid
- Music by: Edward Paul
- Color process: Black-and-white
- Production company: Jerry Fairbanks Productions
- Distributed by: Jerry Fairbanks Productions
- Release date: December 25, 1949
- Running time: 25 minutes
- Country: United States
- Language: English

The Christmas Carol is a 1949 low-budget, black and white television special narrated by Vincent Price. Compressing Charles Dickens' classic 1843 story into a half-hour, it is stated to be "the oldest extant straight adaptation of the story" for television. It was originally produced as a syndicated production for airing on 22 stations across the United States on Christmas Day in 1949. It was sponsored by Magnavox and represented that company's first use of television advertising. In 1952, the show was acquired by Consolidated Television Sales for further syndication.

The production is considered primitive by modern standards; it is also noted for misspelling Ebenezer Scrooge's name as "Ebeneezer" in the opening credits and on the headstone of his grave. The cast is led by Taylor Holmes as Scrooge and includes an early appearance by Jill St. John, then age 9 and billed as Jill Oppenheim, who plays one of the Cratchit daughters.

== Cast ==
- Taylor Holmes as Ebeneezer Scrooge
- Patrick Whyte as Bob Cratchit (as Pat White)
- Robert Clarke as Fred
- Earl Lee as Ghost of Marley
- Nelson Leigh as Ghost of Christmas Past
- Joe Battista as Boy Scrooge
- George James as Ghost of Christmas Present
- Queenie Leonard as Mrs. Cratchit
- Mike Miller as Peter Cratchit
- Karen Kester as Belinda Cratchit
- Jill St. John as Missie Cratchit (as Jill Oppenheim)
- Robert Hyatt as Tiny Tim (as Bobby Hyatt)
- Constance Cavendish as Martha (as Connie Cavendish)
- Jack Nestle as Ghost of Christmas Yet to Come
- Paul Maxey as Fat Gentleman
- Leonard Carey as Thin Gentleman
- Ann Howard as Caroline

== See also ==
- Adaptations of A Christmas Carol
- List of Christmas films
