= Virginia Valli =

American actress

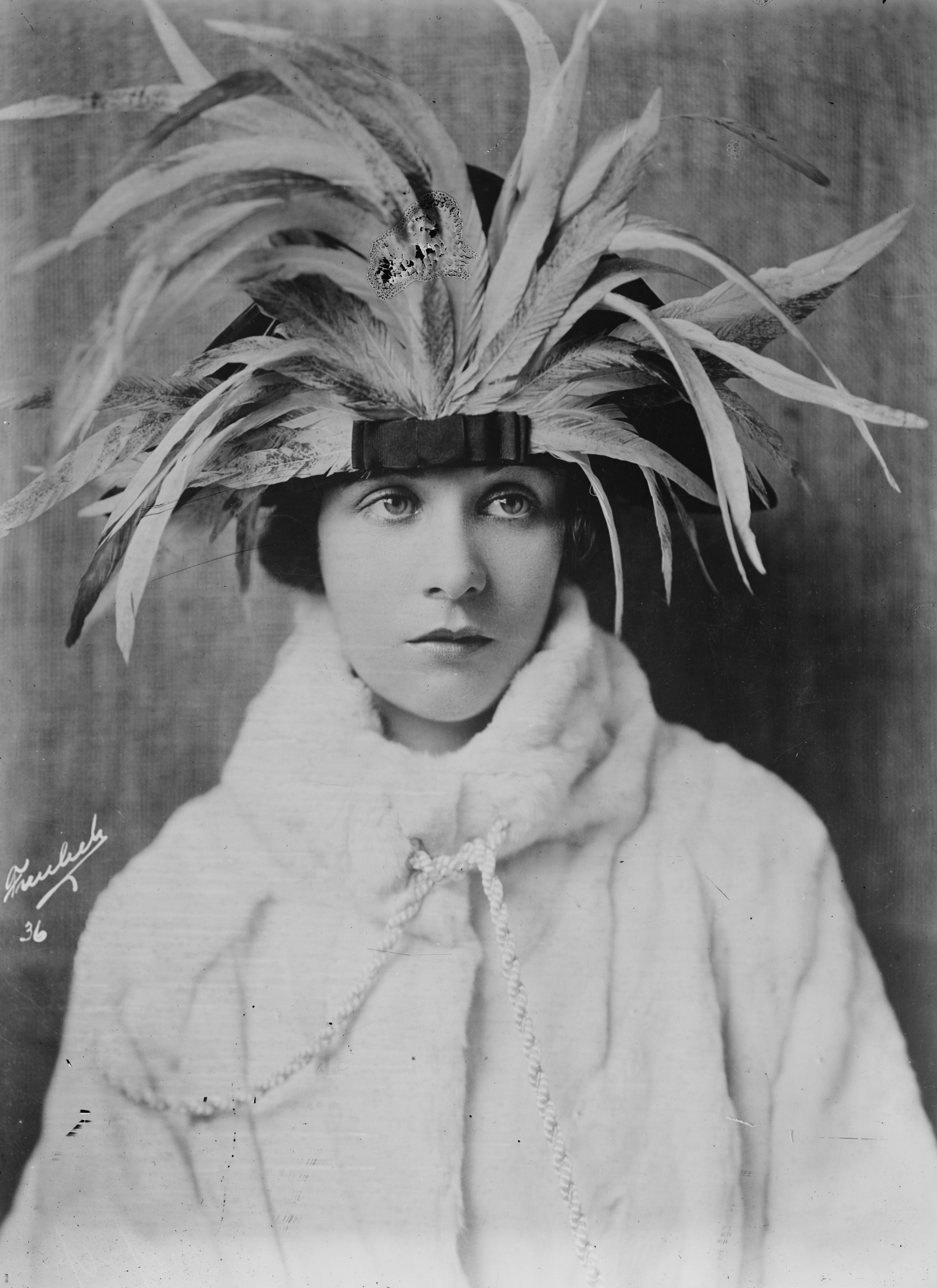
- Valli, c. 1920
- Born: Virginia McSweeney; January 18, 1895; Chicago, Illinois, U.S.
- Died: September 24, 1968 (aged 73); Palm Springs, California, U.S.
- Resting place: Welwood Murray Cemetery, Palm Springs
- Years active: 1916–1931 (film)
- Spouses: George Lamson (m. 1921; div. 1926) Charles Farrell (m. 1931)

Virginia Valli (January 18, 1895 – September 24, 1968) was an American stage and film actress whose motion picture career started in the silent film era and lasted until the beginning of the sound film era of the 1930s.

== Early life ==
Valli was born as Virginia McSweeney in 1895 (although some sources say 1898) in Chicago, Illinois. She got her acting start in Milwaukee with a stock company. She also did some film work with Essanay Studios in Chicago, starting in 1916.

== Film career ==
Valli continued to appear in films throughout the 1920s. She was an established star at the Universal studio by the mid-1920s. In 1924 she was the female lead in King Vidor's southern gothic Wild Oranges, a film now recovered from film vault obscurity. She also appeared in the romantic comedy, Every Woman's Life, about "the man she could have married, the man she should have married and the man she DID marry." Most of her films were made between 1924 and 1927, and included Alfred Hitchcock's debut feature, The Pleasure Garden (1925), Paid to Love (1927), with William Powell, and Evening Clothes (1927), which featured Adolphe Menjou. In 1925 Valli performed in The Man Who Found Himself, with Thomas Meighan.

Her first sound picture was The Isle of Lost Ships with Jason Robards Sr. and Noah Beery Sr. in 1929. Her last film was in Night Life in Reno, in 1931.

== Personal life ==
Valli was first married to George Lamson and the two shared a bungalow in Hollywood, near the Hollywood Hotel.

In 1931, she married her second husband, actor Charles Farrell. They moved to Palm Springs, where she was a social fixture for many years.

She suffered a stroke in 1966, and died two years later, aged 73, in Palm Springs. She was buried in the Welwood Murray Cemetery in Palm Springs. She had no children.

== Filmography ==
- Filling His Own Shoes (1917)
- The Golden Idiot (1917)
- The Fibbers (1917)
- Satan's Private Door (1917)
- Uneasy Money (1918)
- Ruggles of Red Gap (1918)
- His Father's Wife (1919)
- The Black Circle (1919)
- The Very Idea (1920)
- The Dead Line (1920)
- The Midnight Bride (1920)
- The Common Sin (1920)
- The Plunger (1920)
- The Silver Lining (1921)
- Sentimental Tommy (1921)
- The Idle Rich (1921)
- The Man Who (1921)
- A Trip to Paradise (1921)
- The Devil Within (1921)
- Love's Penalty (1921)
- The Right That Failed (1922)
- His Back Against the Wall (1922)
- The Black Bag (1922)
- The Village Blacksmith (1922)
- Tracked to Earth (1922)
- The Storm (1922)
- The Shock (1923)
- A Lady of Quality (1924)
- Wild Oranges (1924)
- The Confidence Man (1924)
- The Signal Tower (1924)
- K – The Unknown (1924)
- In Every Woman's Life (1924)
- The Lady Who Lied (1925)
- The Price of Pleasure (1925)
- The Man Who Found Himself (1925)
- Siege (1925)
- Up the Ladder (1925)
- The Pleasure Garden (1925)
- Watch Your Wife (1926)
- Flames (1926)
- The Family Upstairs (1926)
- Stage Madness (1927)
- Judgment of the Hills (1927)
- Evening Clothes (1927)
- Marriage (1927)
- Paid to Love (1927)
- Ladies Must Dress (1927)
- East Side, West Side (1927)
- The Street of Illusion (1928)
- The Escape (1928)
- The Isle of Lost Ships (1929)
- The Lost Zeppelin (1929)
- Mister Antonio (1929)
- Behind Closed Doors (1929)
- Guilty? (1930)
- Night Life in Reno (1931)
