= Taylor Holmes =

American actor (1878–1959)

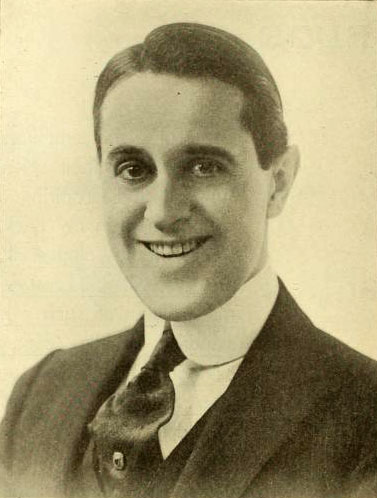
- Holmes in 1919
- Born: May 16, 1878; Newark, New Jersey, U.S.
- Died: September 30, 1959 (aged 81); Hollywood, Los Angeles, U.S.
- Resting place: Holy Cross Cemetery, Culver City
- Occupation: Actor
- Years active: 1899–1959
- Spouse: Edna Phillips
- Children: 3, including Phillips Holmes

Rudyard Kipling's poem "Boots" performed by Taylor Holmes, 1915

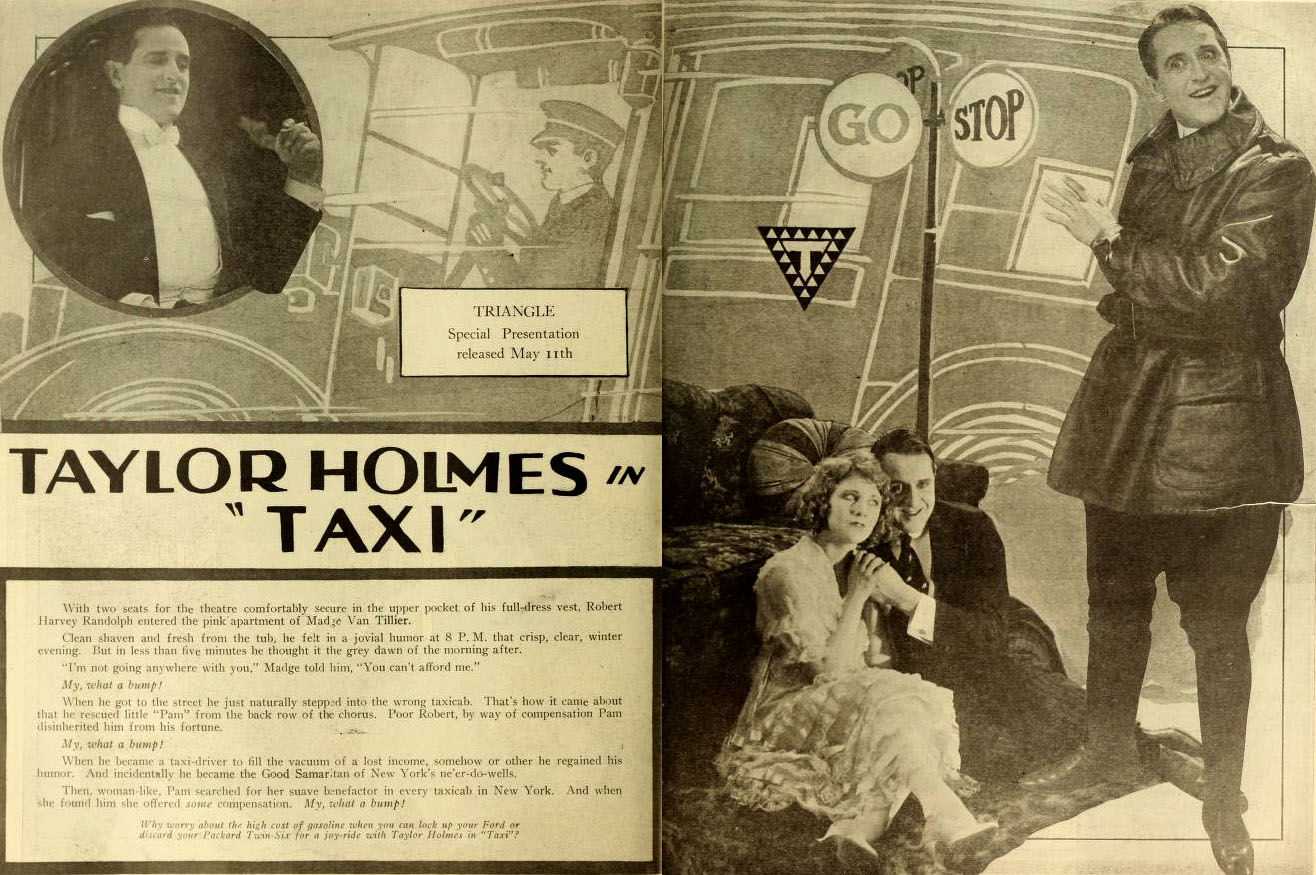
Advertisement (1919)

Taylor Holmes (May 16, 1878 – September 30, 1959) was an American actor who appeared in over 100 Broadway plays and on-screen performances over his five-decade career. His 1915 spoken word recording of Rudyard Kipling's "Boots" is considered the seminal performance of the poem, used in military training and referenced across modern pop culture.

== Early life ==
Holmes was born on May 16, 1878, in Newark, New Jersey, and educated in Chicago. He had a brother, Herbert Holmes.

== Career ==
Holmes's early activities in entertaining occurred in Chicago, where he produced plays for amateur companies and worked "as a parlor, club and concert entertainer". When Olga Nethersole was performing in Chicago, Holmes did his "singing and grotesque dancing act" on stage for her and some friends after a matinee. She liked his act enough to invite him to join her company, but his commitments in Chicago prevented him from accepting.

=== Stage ===
Holmes debuted on stage in Sapho at Keith's Vaudeville Theater in Boston on May 16, 1899. He made his Broadway debut in February 1900 portraying De Potter in the controversial play Sapho, which was briefly closed for indecency. Holmes played Rosencrantz with E. H. Sothern in a production of Hamlet and toured with Robert Edeson. He appeared in stage hits such as The Commuters, The Music Master, and His Majesty Bunker Bean.

In 1901-1903, he performed with Blaney's stock company in Newark, progressing from a "utility man" to a "heavy man" to a light comedian as time went on. In March 1903 he joined Keith's stock company at the Bijou Theater in Philadelphia. He went on to perform in plays in other cities including Buffalo and New York.

=== Film ===
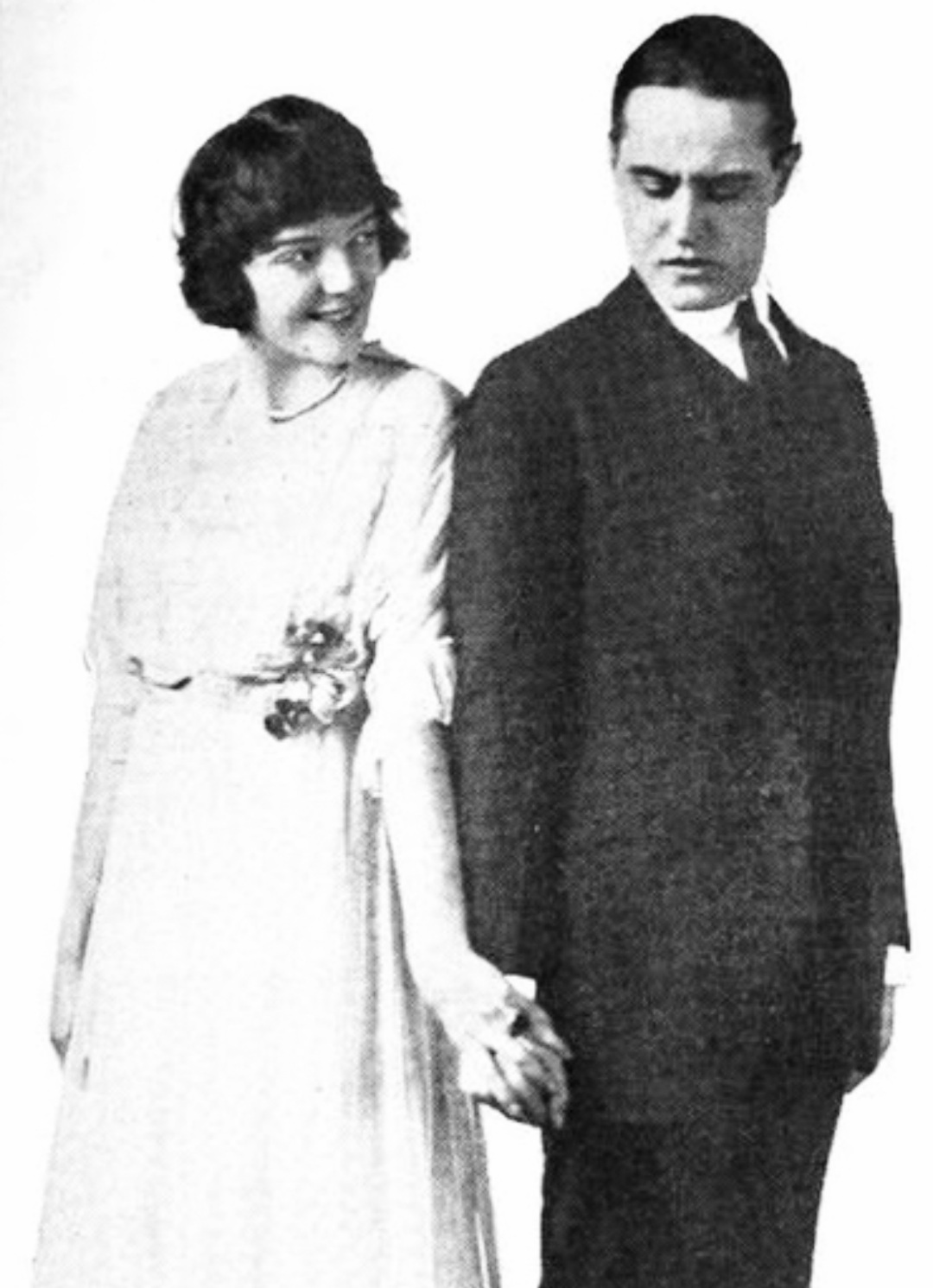
Florence Shirley and Holmes in promotion for the 1916 Broadway play His Majesty Bunker Bean

Early film appearances included Efficiency Edgar's Courtship and Fools for Luck. One of his first starring roles was in A Pair of Sixes (1918).

In the 1940s, he worked more on film than on stage. Holmes played a number of memorable roles, particularly in film noir, including the gullible millionaire conned in Nightmare Alley (1947), a shifty lawyer in Kiss of Death (1947), and as Gavery, a reptilian disbarred lawyer in Act of Violence (1949).

He played the Bishop of Avranches, who fiercely denounces Pierre Cauchon in the Ingrid Bergman Joan of Arc (1948), and Marilyn Monroe's potential father-in-law in the 1953 Gentlemen Prefer Blondes ("I don't want to marry your son for his money, I want to marry him for your money!").

He was the voice of King Stefan in the final cut of Disney's animated feature Sleeping Beauty (1959), Holmes' last credited screen role. He played Ebenezer Scrooge in a low-budget half-hour television version of Charles Dickens's A Christmas Carol, first telecast in 1949.

== Personal life ==
Holmes was married to actress Edna Phillips. He is the father of actors Phillips Holmes, Madeleine Taylor Holmes, and Ralph Holmes.

Holmes died on September 30, 1959, at the age of 80 in his Hollywood home. He was interred in Culver City's Holy Cross Cemetery.

== Legacy ==
Holmes has a star on the Hollywood Walk of Fame.

Holmes’ 1915 spoken-word recording of the Rudyard Kipling poem "Boots" was used for its psychological effect in U.S. military SERE schools.

Holmes's recitation was used in the cinematic trailer for the Call of Duty: Black Ops 6 Zombies map "Terminus". The same recording was used in the 2023 horror film Horror in the High Desert 2: Minerva, as well as on the track "Boots" by Young Fathers, as part of their soundtrack for the 2025 horror film 28 Years Later, as well as its acclaimed trailer.

In January 2026, the official Valorant TikTok account posted a stitched compilation of several cinematics animated by Fortiche with an arrangement of Holmes's recitation as the main audio.

== Partial filmography ==
Silent

- Efficiency Edgar's Courtship (1917) (short) as Edgar Bumpus
- Fools for Luck (1917) as Philander Jepson
- Two-Bit Seats (1917) as Jimmy Mason
- The Small Town Guy (1917) as Ernest Gledhill
- Uneasy Money (1918) as Lord Dawlish
- Ruggles of Red Gap (1918) as Marmaduke Ruggles
- A Pair of Sixes (1918) as T. Boggs Johns
- It's a Bear (1919) as Orlando Wintrhop
- A Regular Fellow (1919) (*George Eastman preserved) as Dalion Pemberton
- Taxi (1919) as Robert Hervey Randolph
- Upside Down (1919) as Archibald Pim
- Three Black Eyes (1919) as Larry Van Cortlandt
- Nothing But the Truth (1920) as Robert Bennett
- The Very Idea (1920) as Gilbert Goodhue
- Nothing but Lies (1920) as George Cross
- Twenty Dollars a Week (1924) as William Hart
- Her Market Value (1925) as Courtney Brooks
- The Crimson Runner (1925) as Bobo (valet)
- The Verdict (1925) as Valet
- Borrowed Finery (1925) as Billy
- One Hour of Love (1927) as Joe Monahan
- Should a Mason Tell? (1927) (short) as Henry
- Their Second Honeymoon (1927) (short) as Henry
- King Harold (1927) (short) as Henry

Sound

- Lovers' Delight (1929, Short)
- He Did His Best (1929, Short)
- Let Me Explain (1930, Short)
- Dad Knows Best (1930, Short)
- Terry of the 'Times' (1930) (unconfirmed, uncredited)
- It Happened in Paris (1932)
- Before Morning (1933) as Leo Bergman
- The First Baby (1936) as Mr. Wells
- The Crime of Dr. Forbes (1936) as Dr. Robert Empey
- Make Way for a Lady (1936) as George Terry
- Boomerang (1947) as T.M. Wade
- Kiss of Death (1947) as Earl Howser—Attorney
- Nightmare Alley (1947) as Ezra Grindle
- Let's Live Again (1948) as Uncle Jim
- Smart Woman (1948) as Dr. Jasper
- Hazard (1948) as Mr. Meeler
- The Plunderers (1948) as Eben Martin
- Joan of Arc (1948) as The Bishop of Avranches
- That Wonderful Urge (1948) as Attorney Rice
- Act of Violence (1948) as Gavery
- Joe Palooka in the Big Fight (1949) as Dr. Benson
- Mr. Belvedere Goes to College (1949) as Dr. Gibbs
- Once More, My Darling (1949) as Jed Connell
- A Christmas Carol (1949) as Ebeneezer Scrooge
- Woman in Hiding (1950) as Jed Connell
- Mr. Belvedere Goes to College (1950) as Lucius Maury
- Quicksand (1950) as Harvey
- Caged (1950) as Senator Ted Donnolly (uncredited)
- Father of the Bride (1950) as Warner
- Bright Leaf (1950) as Lawyer Calhoun
- Copper Canyon (1950) as Theodosius Roberts
- Double Deal (1950) as C.D. 'Corpus' Mills
- The First Legion (1951) as Father Keene
- Rhubarb (1951) as P. Duncan Munk
- Drums in the Deep South (1951) as Albert Monroe
- Two Tickets to Broadway (1951) as Willard Glendon
- Hold That Line (1952) as Dean Forrester
- Hoodlum Empire (1952) as Benjamin Lawton
- Sudden Fear (1952) as Scott Martindale (uncredited)
- Beware, My Lovely (1952) as Mr. Walter Armstrong
- Woman of the North Country (1952) as Andrew Dawson
- Ride the Man Down (1952) as Lowell Priest
- She's Back on Broadway (1953) as Talbot (uncredited)
- Gentlemen Prefer Blondes (1953) as Mr. Esmond Sr.
- Wonder Valley (1953) as Sweetheart's Father
- Untamed Heiress (1954) as Walter Martin
- The Outcast (1954) as Andrew Devlin
- Tobor the Great (1954) as Prof. Arnold Nordstrom
- Hell's Outpost (1954) as Timothy Byers
- Lady and the Tramp (1955) as Jim's Friend #2/Doctor (voice, uncredited)
- The Fighting Chance (1955) as Railbird - the Tout
- The Maverick Queen (1956) as Pete Callaher
- The Peacemaker (1956) as Mr. Wren
- The Book of Acts Series (1957) as High Priest
- The Helen Morgan Story (1957) as Elderly Actor on Train (uncredited)
- Wink of an Eye (1958) as Mr. Vanryzin
- Sleeping Beauty (1959) as King Stefan (voice) (final film role)
