= Uneasy Money (1918 film) =

- Directed by: Lawrence C. Windom
- Written by: Raymond E. Dakin
- Based on: Uneasy Money by P. G. Wodehouse
- Produced by: George K. Spoor
- Starring: Taylor Holmes; Virginia Valli; Arthur W. Bates
- Cinematography: Arthur E. Reeves
- Production companies: Essanay Film Manufacturing Company and Perfection Pictures
- Distributed by: George Kleine System
- Release date: 1 January 1918
- Running time: 5–6 reels
- Country: United States
- Language: Silent (English intertitles)

Uneasy Money is an American silent romantic comedy film released in 1918, starring Taylor Holmes, Virginia Valli, and Arthur W. Bates. The film is based on the 1916 novel Uneasy Money by P. G. Wodehouse. It is a lost film, with no surviving reels available.

== Cast ==
- Taylor Holmes as Lord Dawlish
- Virginia Valli as Elizabeth Nutcombe
- Arthur W. Bates as Nutty Nutcombe
- Charles Gardner as Ira Nutcombe
- Virginia Bowker as Lady Wetherby
- Fred Tiden as Lord Wetherby
- Lillian Drew as Claire Edmont
- James F. Fulton as Mr. Pickering
- Rod La Rocque as Johnny Gates

== Production ==
The film was produced by George K. Spoor and directed by Lawrence C. Windom.
