= One Wonderful Night (1922 film) =

1922 film by Stuart Paton

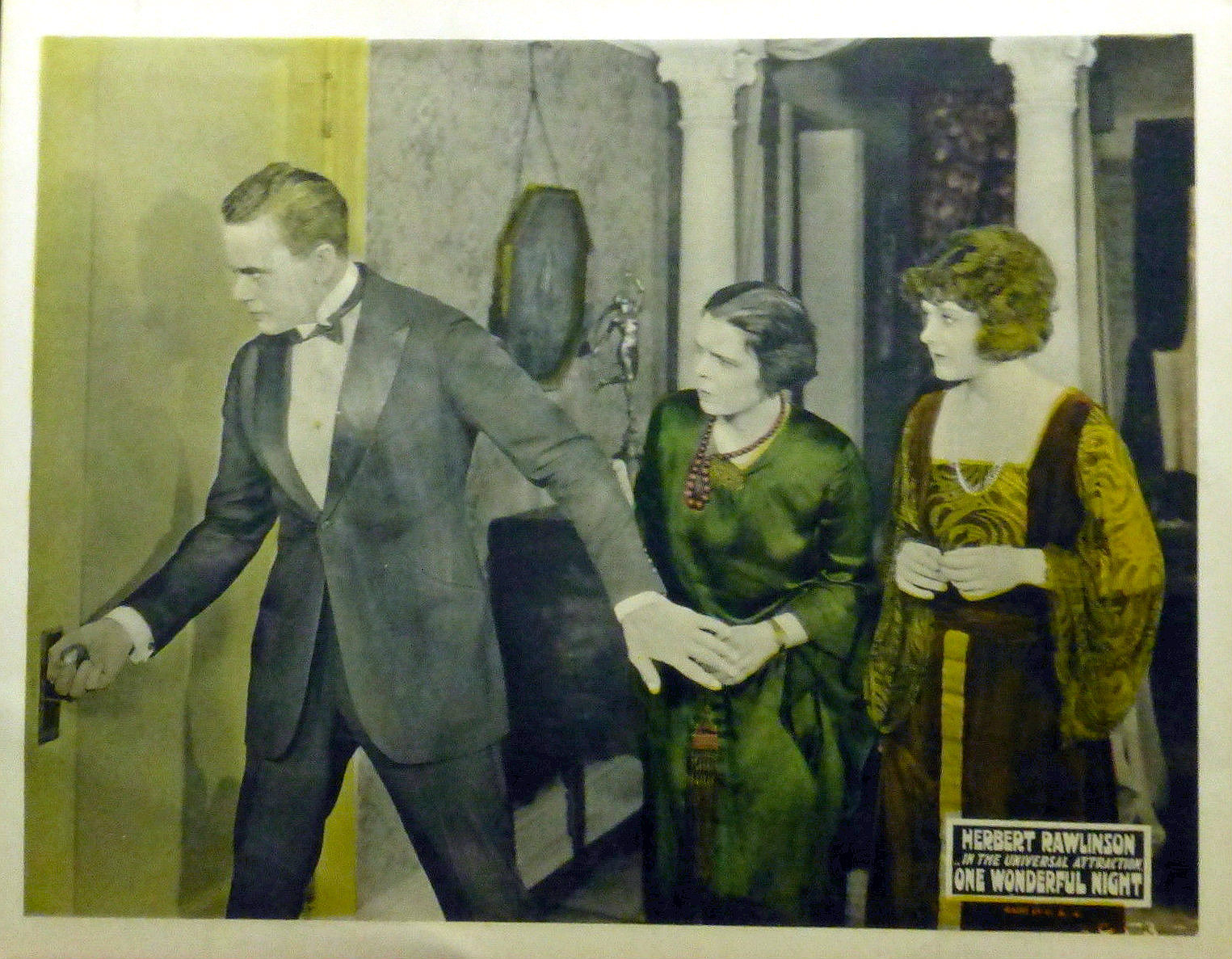
- Lobby card
- Directed by: Stuart Paton
- Written by: George C. Hull (scenario)
- Based on: One Wonderful Night by Louis Tracy
- Produced by: Carl Laemmle
- Starring: Herbert Rawlinson
- Cinematography: G. W. Warren
- Distributed by: Universal Film Manufacturing Company
- Release date: December 17, 1922
- Running time: 5 reels
- Country: United States
- Language: Silent (English intertitles)

One Wonderful Night is a 1922 American silent mystery film directed by Stuart Paton and starring Herbert Rawlinson. It was produced and distributed by Universal Film Manufacturing Company and is based on the novel of the same name by Louis Tracy.

The story had been filmed in 1914 at Essanay starring Francis X. Bushman.

== Plot ==
As described in a film magazine, John D. Curtis (Rawlinson) arrives in New York City after 5 years spent in China. Stepping from the door of his hotel, he sees a man struck down by thugs. As he was the only witness, the police are not sure of his innocence, but they allow him to go upon his promise of an early return for questioning. By mistake he carries off the assaulted man's overcoat, and in the pocket he finds a marriage license with the names of Jean de Curtois (De Briac) and Hermione Fane (Rich). "Hermione Fane," he thinks, "the charming girl I met at the Ambassador's Ball in Peking." Visiting Hermione, John finds that she had hired Jean to marry her so as to escape marriage to the Count de Mauriat (Aitken). She is distressed by the news that Jean had been killed. By a provision in a will, she must marry by midnight or lose her fortune. John decides to rescue the situation and they are married. Her father (De Gray) and the Count arrive and are outraged. They call the police, but John clears himself. Then he sees a taxi whose occupants had assaulted Jean. With the police he captures the driver and they learn of the Count's guilt in the promotion of the assault. Then there is the news that Jean is alive, which complicates matters. Meanwhile, the Count and father attempt to harm John's reputation with Hermione, but the Count is discovered to be counterfeit and reveals his nature by attempting to blackmail Hermione. In the end John resolves matters with his bride.

== Cast ==
- Herbert Rawlinson as John D. Curtis
- Lillian Rich as Hermione Fane
- Dale Fuller as Maid
- Sidney De Gray as A. F. Fane
- Joseph W. Girard as Chief of Detectives
- Jean De Briac as Jean de Curtois
- Amelio Mendez as Anatole
- Sidney Bracey as Juggins
- Spottiswoode Aitken as Minister, the Count de Mauriat

== Preservation status ==
A copy of the film is held at the Gosfilmofond archive, Moscow.
