= Uneasy Money (novel) =

1917 novel by P. G. Wodehouse

- First edition (US)
- Author: P. G. Wodehouse
- Language: English
- Publisher: D. Appleton & Company (US); Methuen & Co. (UK)
- Publication date: 17 March 1916 (US); 4 October 1917 (UK)
- Publication place: United States
- Media type: Print

Uneasy Money is a novel by P. G. Wodehouse, first published in the United States on 17 March 1916 by D. Appleton & Company, New York, and in the United Kingdom on 4 October 1917 by Methuen & Co., London. The story had earlier been serialised in the U.S in the Saturday Evening Post from December 1915, and in the UK in the Strand Magazine starting December 1916.

Taking place primarily in New York City and then-rural Long Island, the story tells of amiable but hard-up "Bill", Lord Dawlish, who inherits a fortune from a rich American he once helped in golf. When Bill learns that the rich man left nothing to his niece Elizabeth Boyd, he feels uneasy and decides to give half the money to her, though this turns out to be unexpectedly difficult.

Some of the characters and locations in the novel appear in other Wodehouse stories. Marvis Bay features in numerous stories and novels. Publicist Roscoe Sherriff appears in Indiscretions of Archie (1921), and young lawyer Gerald "Jerry" Nichols returns in Bachelors Anonymous (1973). New York restaurant Reigelheimer's is referenced in the short story "The Aunt and the Sluggard" (1916), the village of Brookport appears again in Jill the Reckless (1920), and the character Claire Fenwick travels on the White Star Line steamship Atlantic, which is featured in The Girl on the Boat (1921).

== Plot ==
William FitzWilliam Delamere Chalmers, Lord Dawlish, or "Bill", makes his living as a London club secretary. His beautiful fiancée, Claire Fenwick, will not marry him unless he makes more money. Bill hopes to make money in America, and his American friend Gates lends Bill the keys to his New York apartment. Claire gets a letter from her American friend Pauline or "Polly", who married Algie, Lord Wetherby, another impecunious English lord. Polly is earning a large salary in New York dancing at Reigelheimer's Restaurant. She invites Claire to visit, and mentions that she bought a snake named Clarence and a monkey named Eustace for publicity as directed by her press agent, Roscoe Sherriff. Bill learns from his friend, lawyer Jerry Nichols, that he inherited a million pounds from Ira Nutcombe, an American whom Bill once helped at golf. The millionaire left his nephew only twenty pounds, and nothing to his niece, to whom he had left all his money in older wills. Bill feels he should see her and split the money with her. The niece, Elizabeth Boyd, is a hard-working beekeeper in Brookport, Long Island, where she lives with her irresponsible brother "Nutty", Claude Nutcombe Boyd. A letter from Jerry informs them that Nutcombe's money went to someone called Lord Dawlish.

In New York, Bill sends a letter to Elizabeth offering to split the money, but she sends a reply refusing. Nutty, a friend of Gates, shows up at Gates's apartment and meets Bill. He invites Bill, who only calls himself Bill Chalmers, to join him with friends at Reigelheimer's. At the restaurant, Claire sees Bill, who crashes loudly into a waiter while dancing, but does not approach him because Polly's rich friend Dudley Pickering is interested in Claire. Nutty learns Bill is Lord Dawlish, and, hoping to get some money, invites him to the bee farm. Elizabeth is initially annoyed when Nutty brings a stranger home, but she bonds with Bill over beekeeping and golf. Since she is angry at Lord Dawlish, feeling he tried to give her charity, Bill keeps his identity secret. Polly brings Algie, Claire, Dudley, and the monkey to her house in Brookport. Dudley and Claire get engaged. She sees Bill again, and breaks up with him, using the excuse that she saw Bill dancing with a girl at Reigelheimer's. Dudley, concerned by recent local burglaries, suspects Bill is a thief.

At Polly's house, the monkey throws eggs and plates, and bites Dudley, then runs off. Nutty sees the monkey, but Elizabeth, who wants Nutty to stop drinking, pretends not to see it, and Nutty swears off drink. Elizabeth decides to keep the monkey for a day or two in case Nutty changes his mind. Bill discovers that Claire got engaged to Dudley shortly before breaking up with him. Claire denies knowing Bill, making Dudley more certain Bill is a burglar. Dudley investigates the bee farm carrying a revolver, and accidentally fires his gun and kills the monkey without realizing it. Bill and Elizabeth find the dead monkey, and uncertain of what to do, they carry him away. Dudley follows, thinking they are burglars carrying their loot, and Elizabeth hears him. She gets scared, but Bill comforts her and they confess their feelings for each other. They leave the dead monkey in Algie's shack, which Dudley enters. He is found there by Polly, Algie, and Claire. They rebuke Dudley for shooting the monkey and Claire ends their engagement.

Claire finds out about Bill's inheritance and tries to win him back, but he refuses, being happily engaged to Elizabeth. Claire insists that Elizabeth knows who Bill is and is marrying him for his money, and returns to Dudley. Nutty, mistakenly believing Elizabeth got engaged to Bill for the money, tries to console her. Bill overhears this, and thinks that Claire was right. Elizabeth explains that Nutty told her Bill was Lord Dawlish days ago but she truly loves him. Bill believes her, but Elizabeth, afraid that Bill will come to doubt her feelings for him, tells him to go, and he reluctantly leaves for the city. Jerry Nichols appears, and asks Elizabeth not to tell his father, the head of his legal firm, about how he acted prematurely; Nutcombe actually left his money to Elizabeth in his final will. Nutty celebrates with Jerry while Elizabeth rushes off and catches Bill's train. They plan to get married when the train reaches New York and later run a big bee farm together.

== Background ==
The exclusive club that Bill works for as secretary in the beginning of the novel, Brown's, was based on a real London club, White's. Brown's is stated in the first chapter of Uneasy Money to be located in St James Street; White's is in fact located in St James's Street.

In the last chapter, Elizabeth and Bill decide to get married in a church "on Twenty-ninth Street, just round the corner from Fifth Avenue"; this is a reference to the Little Church Around the Corner, where Wodehouse married his wife Ethel in 1914. The fictional village in the novel, Brookport, was likely inspired by Bellport, a village in Brookhaven, New York, where the Wodehouses lived in the first years of their marriage.

== Publication history ==
The story was published as a serial in the Saturday Evening Post between 4 December 1915 and 15 January 1916, and in the Strand Magazine between December 1916 and June 1917. It was the second novel Wodehouse sold to George Horace Lorimer of the Post, after Something Fresh. Both serials were published in seven parts. The Post serial is nearly identical to the US edition book, and the Strand serial is nearly identical to the UK edition book. Illustrations by Clarence F. Underwood were used for both serials.

The US edition is dedicated: "To My Wife, Bless Her". The first US edition featured a frontispiece and seven illustrations by Clarence F. Underwood. Underwood drew the colour illustration on the front of the dust jacket, which appeared in black and white facing page 222 of the text (and in the final part of both magazine serials). A new foreword by Wodehouse was printed in the 1976 UK edition.

A volume containing both Uneasy Money and Aunts Aren't Gentlemen was published by Heron Books in London in the 1970s. The book, designed by William B. Taylor, was one of a set of eighteen volumes published by Heron Books, each containing two Wodehouse books.

== Adaptations ==
A silent film adaptation, also titled Uneasy Money, was released in 1918.
