= Lillian Drew =

American actress

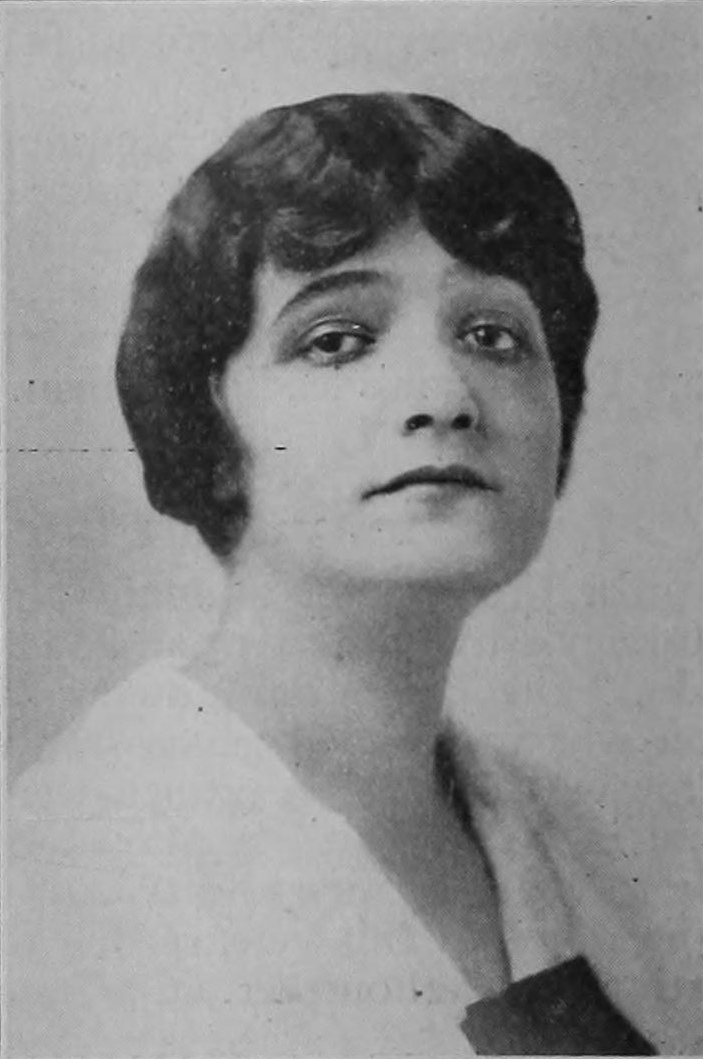
- Lillian Drew, from a 1916 publication
- Born: Lillian Margaret Flannery; August 1882; Chicago, Illinois
- Died: February 4, 1924 (aged 41); Chicago, Illinois
- Occupation: Actress
- Spouse: E. H. Calvert

Lillian Drew (August 1882 – February 4, 1924), born Lillian Margaret Flannery, was an American actress during the silent film era.

== Early life ==
Lillian Margaret Flannery was born in Chicago, the daughter of Patrick J. Flannery and Marguerite M. Flannery. All of her grandparents were born in Ireland.

== Career ==
Drew made more than eighty silent films, mostly short films, for Essanay Studios in Chicago and Chattanooga. She was known for her riding skills, and preference for "heavy dramatic" roles. Her first film was The Broken Heart (1913) with Ruth Stonehouse. She appeared with Gloria Swanson in The Fable of Elvira and Farina and the Meal Ticket (1915). Other films with Drew include Blind Man's Bluff (1914), The Clutch of Circumstance (1915), In the Palace of the King (1915), A Million for a Baby (1916), Money to Burn (1916), The Secret of the Night (1916), The Other Man (1916), My Country, 'Tis of Thee (1916) The Woman Always Pays (1916), Vultures of Society (1916), Uneasy Money (1918), and Ruggles of Red Gap (1918). Her last movie was Children of Jazz (1923) with Ricardo Cortez. She worked as a dressmaker in her last years.

== Personal life ==
Lillian Drew married fellow actor and director E. H. Calvert in 1907. They had a son, William Calvert, who became a child actor. The Calverts were separated, and she was recovering from an injury, when she died in Chicago in 1924, from an overdose of barbital, aged 41 years. Her death was ruled accidental by a coroner's jury.
