= Master Thief =

Master Thief may refer to:

- The Master Thief, a fairytale collected by Peter Christen Asbjørnsen and Jørgen Moe.
- The Master Thief, a 1919 play by Edward Everett Rose.
