= The Age of Innocence (1934 film) =

1934 film by Philip Moeller

- Directed by: Philip Moeller
- Screenplay by: Sarah Y. Mason; Victor Heerman
- Based on: The Age of Innocence 1920 novel by Edith Wharton; The Age of Innocence 1928 play by Margaret Ayer Barnes
- Produced by: Pandro S. Berman
- Starring: Irene Dunne; John Boles; Lionel Atwill
- Narrated by: John Boles
- Cinematography: James Van Trees
- Edited by: George Hively
- Music by: Max Steiner (uncredited)
- Production company: RKO Radio Pictures
- Distributed by: RKO Radio Pictures
- Release date: September 14, 1934
- Running time: 81 minutes
- Country: United States
- Language: English

The Age of Innocence is a 1934 American drama film directed by Philip Moeller and starring Irene Dunne, John Boles and Lionel Atwill. The film is an adaptation of the 1920 novel The Age of Innocence by Edith Wharton, set in the fashionable New York society of the 1870s. Prolific on Broadway, Philip Moeller directed only two films: this, and the 1935 Break of Hearts with Katharine Hepburn.

The novel was also adapted in a 1924 silent film version starring Beverly Bayne and a 1993 film version that starred Michelle Pfeiffer. A 1928 Broadway stage adaptation starred Katharine Cornell.

== Plot ==
At his 1875 engagement party, the wealthy Newland Archer is surprised to meet his childhood friend Ellen, beautiful and grown up and now Countess Olenska. Olenska is the cousin of his fiancee May and is considered scandalous by the strait-laced society of the time. Newland, however, treats her well and sends her two dozen yellow roses. Olenska turns to Newland for advice about a possible divorce.

== Cast ==
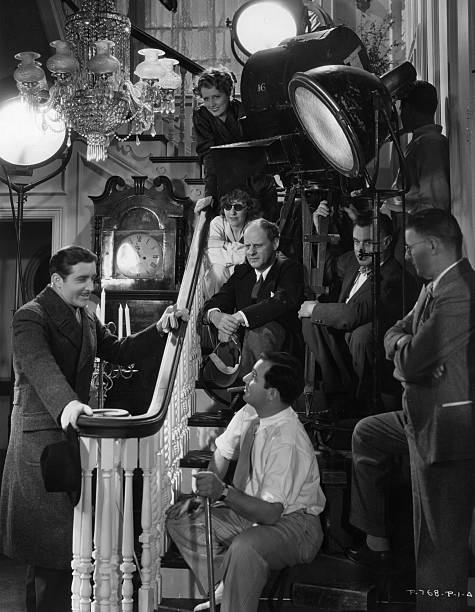
Director Philip Moeller (seated center, holding eye-shade) on the set of The Age of Innocence. Assistant director Edward Killy (seated center foreground) rehearses actor John Boles (left); Irene Dunne is behind the lights, smiling down.

- Irene Dunne as Countess Ellen Olenska
- John Boles as Newland Archer
- Lionel Atwill as Julius Beaufort
- Helen Westley as Granny Manson Mingott
- Laura Hope Crews as Augusta Welland
- Julie Haydon as May Welland
- Herbert Yost as Howard Welland
- Teresa Maxwell-Conover as Mrs. Archer
- Edith Van Cleve as Jane Archer
- Leonard Carey as Jasper, the Butler
- Harry Beresford as Museum Guard (uncredited)
- Herbert Bunston as W.J. Letterblair (uncredited)

== Reception ==
The film was a box-office disappointment.
