= The Age of Innocence =

1920 novel by Edith Wharton

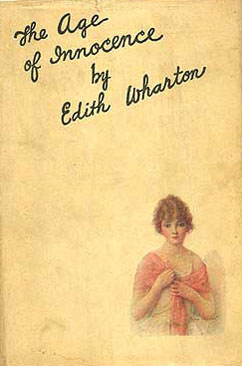
- 1920 first edition dust jacket
- Author: Edith Wharton
- Language: English
- Publisher: D. Appleton & Company
- Publication date: October 25, 1920
- Publication place: United States
- Awards: 1921 Pulitzer Prize for Fiction
- Text: The Age of Innocence online

The Age of Innocence is a novel by American author Edith Wharton, published on 25 October 1920. It was her eighth novel, and was initially serialized in 1920 in four parts, in the magazine Pictorial Review. Later that year, it was released as a book by D. Appleton & Company. It won the 1921 Pulitzer Prize for Fiction, making Wharton the first woman to win the prize. Though the committee had initially agreed to give the award to Sinclair Lewis for Main Street, the judges, in rejecting his book on political grounds, "established Wharton as the American 'First Lady of Letters'". The story is set in the 1870s, in upper-class, "Gilded Age" New York City. Wharton wrote the book in her 50s, after she was already established as a major author in high demand by publishers.

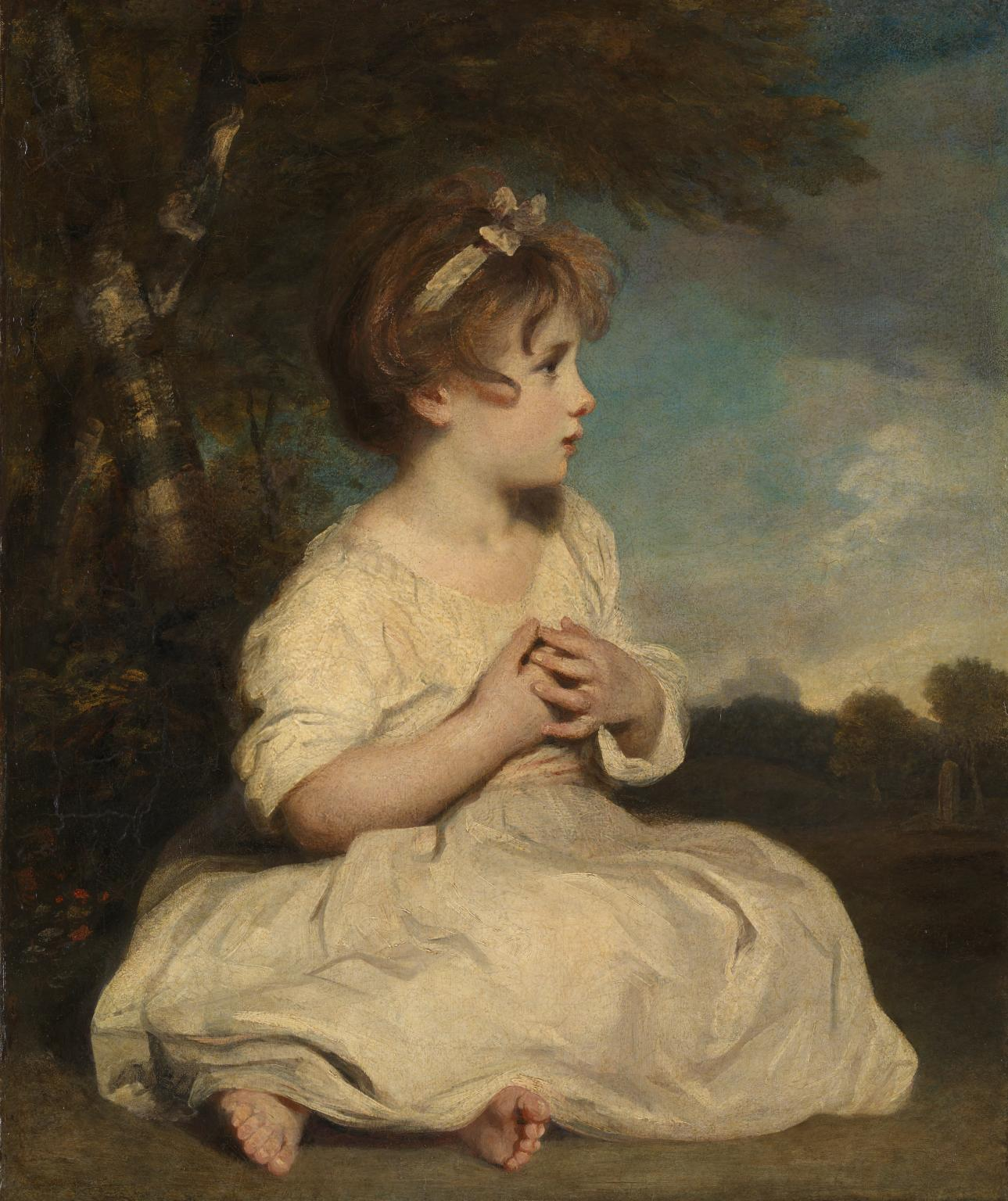
The Age of Innocence, a character study by the Englishman Joshua Reynolds completed in either 1785 or 1788, is believed to have been the inspiration for the title of Wharton's novel.

== Background ==
The Age of Innocence, which was set in the time of Wharton's childhood, was a softer and gentler work than The House of Mirth, which Wharton had published in 1905. In her autobiography, Wharton wrote that The Age of Innocence had allowed her to find "a momentary escape in going back to my childish memories of a long-vanished America... it was growing more and more evident that the world I had grown up in and been formed by had been destroyed in 1914." Scholars and readers alike agree that The Age of Innocence is fundamentally a story that struggles to reconcile the old with the new.

Wharton was raised in the old world of rigid and proper New York society, which features in the story. She had spent her middle years, including the whole of World War I, in Europe, where the devastation of a new kind of mechanized warfare was felt most deeply. As explained by Millicent Bell in the Cambridge companion to Wharton, "The Age of Innocence was composed and first read in the aftermath of [Theodore] Roosevelt's death and in the immediate wake of World War I. We frame the ending remembering the multiple losses... not only the loss of Roosevelt but the destruction of the prewar world and all that Wharton valued in it."

The Age of Innocence centers on an upper-class couple's impending marriage, and the introduction of the bride's cousin, plagued by scandal, whose presence threatens their happiness. Though the novel questions the assumptions and morals of 1870s New York society, it never develops into an outright condemnation of the institution. The novel is noted for Wharton's attention to detail and its accurate portrayal of how the 19th-century East Coast American upper class lived, as well as for the social tragedy of its plot. Wharton was 58 years old at publication; she had lived in that world and had seen it change dramatically by the end of World War I.

The title is an ironic comment on the polished outward manners of New York society when compared to its inward machinations. It is believed to have been drawn from the popular painting A Little Girl by Sir Joshua Reynolds that later became known as The Age of Innocence (though Reynolds himself never called it that; the title was given by the engraver Joseph Grozer in 1794), and was widely reproduced as the commercial face of childhood in the later half of the 18th century. The title, while ironic, was not as caustic as the title chosen for The House of Mirth, which Wharton had published in 1905.

== Plot summary ==
The story opens in the 1870s with Newland Archer, gentleman lawyer and heir of one of New York City's most illustrious families, happily anticipating his highly desirable marriage to the sheltered, shallow, and beautiful May Welland. But he finds reason to doubt his choice of bride after the appearance of Countess Ellen Olenska, May's exotic and fascinating cousin. Ellen strikes Archer as the opposite of the innocent and ignorant May. She has returned to New York from Europe after scandalously separating herself from a disastrous marriage to a Polish count. At first, Ellen's arrival and its potential effect on the reputation of his bride-to-be's family disturbs Newland, but he becomes intrigued by Ellen, who brazenly flouts New York society's fastidious rules. As Newland's admiration for her grows, so do his doubts about marrying May, a perfect product of Old New York society; the match no longer seems the ideal fate he had imagined.

Ellen's decision to divorce Count Olenski causes a social crisis for the other members of her family, who are terrified of scandal and disgrace. Living apart can be tolerated, but divorce is unacceptable. Count Olenski has also threatened to besmirch Ellen's reputation by insinuating she has had an affair with his secretary if she formally divorces him, which would destroy the family's standing. To save the Wellands' reputation, a law partner of Newland asks him to dissuade Ellen from going through with the divorce. He succeeds, but in the process comes to care for her. Afraid of falling in love with Ellen, Newland begs May to elope and accelerate their wedding date, but she refuses.

Some weeks later, Newland tells Ellen he loves her; Ellen reciprocates, but is horrified that their love will hurt May, and does not want him to leave May for her. Newland receives May's telegram agreeing to wed sooner.

Newland and May marry. He tries to forget Ellen. His society marriage is mediocre, and the social life he once found absorbing has become empty and joyless. Though Ellen lives in Washington and has remained distant, he is unable to cease loving her. Their paths cross while he and May are in Newport, Rhode Island. Newland discovers that Count Olenski wishes Ellen to return to him, but she has refused, although her family wants her to reconcile with him and return to Europe. Frustrated by her independence, the family has cut off her money, as the count had already done.

Newland obsessively seeks a way to leave May and be with Ellen. Despairing of never making Ellen his wife, he urges her to run away with him, but she refuses. Then Ellen is recalled to New York City to care for her sick grandmother, who accepts her decision to remain separated and agrees to reinstate her allowance.

Back in New York and under renewed pressure from Newland, Ellen relents and agrees to meet with him in secret to consummate their relationship. But shortly after their conversation, Newland discovers that Ellen has decided to return to Europe. When May announces that she and Newland are throwing a farewell party for Ellen, Newland makes up his mind to abandon May and follow Ellen to Europe. That night, after the party, Newland resolves to tell May he is leaving her for Ellen. She interrupts him to tell him that she learned that morning that she is pregnant; she reveals that she had told Ellen of her pregnancy two weeks earlier, despite not being sure of it at the time. The implication is that May did so because she suspected the affair and that this is Ellen's reason for returning to Europe. Hopelessly trapped, Newland decides to remain with May and not to follow Ellen, surrendering his love for his child's sake.

Twenty-six years later, after May's death, Newland and his eldest son are in Paris. The son, learning that his mother's cousin lives there, has arranged to visit Ellen in her Paris apartment. Newland is stunned at the prospect of seeing Ellen again. On arriving outside the apartment building, Newland sends up his son (who resembles his youthful self) alone to meet Ellen, while he waits outside, watching the balcony of her apartment. Newland considers going up, but in the end decides not to; he walks back to his hotel without seeing her. Newland's final words about the love affair are "It's more real to me here than if I went up."

== Major characters ==
=== Newland Archer ===
The story's protagonist is a young, popular, and successful lawyer living with his mother and sister in an elegant New York City house. Since childhood, his life has been shaped by the customs and expectations of upper-class New York City society. His engagement to May Welland is one in a string of accomplishments. At the story's start, he is proud and content to dream about a traditional marriage in which he will be the husband-teacher and she the wife-student. His life changes when he meets Countess Ellen Olenska. Through his relationship with her—first friendship, then love—he begins questioning the values on which he was raised. He sees the sexual inequality of New York society and the shallowness of its customs, and struggles to balance social commitment to May with love for Ellen. He cannot find a place for their love in the intricate, judgmental web of New York society. Throughout the story, he transgresses the boundaries of acceptable behavior for love of Ellen: first following her to Skuytercliff, then Boston, and finally deciding to follow her to Europe (though he changes his mind). In the end, Newland finds that the only place for their love is in his memories. Some scholars see Wharton most in Newland, rather than Ellen.

=== May Welland ===
Newland Archer's fiancée, then wife. Raised to be a perfect wife and mother, she follows and perfectly obeys all of society's customs. Mostly, she is the shallow, uninterested and uninteresting young woman that New York society requires. When they are in St. Augustine, though, May gives Newland a rare glimpse of the maturity and compassion he had previously ignored. She offers to release him from their engagement so he can marry the woman he truly loves, thinking he wants to be with Mrs. Rushworth, a married woman with whom he had recently ended a love affair. When he assures May that he loves only her, May appears to trust him, at least at first. Yet after their marriage, she suspects that Newland is Ellen's lover. Nonetheless, May pretends to be happy before society, maintaining the illusion that she and he have the perfect marriage expected of them. Her unhappiness activates her manipulative nature, and Newland does not see it until too late. To drive Ellen away from him, May tells Ellen of her pregnancy before she is certain of it. Yet there still is compassion in May, even in their mediocre marriage's long years after Ellen's leaving. After May's death, Newland Archer learns she had always known of his continued love for Ellen; as May lay dying, she told their son Dallas that the children could always trust their father, Newland, because he surrendered the thing most meaningful to him out of loyalty to their marriage. Outwardly, May is a picture of Innocence.

=== Ellen Olenska ===
May's cousin and Mrs. Manson Mingott's granddaughter. She became a countess by marrying Polish Count Olenski, a European nobleman. Her husband was allegedly cruel and abusive, stole Ellen's fortune and had affairs with other women. When the story begins, Ellen has fled her unhappy marriage, lived in Venice with her husband's secretary, and has returned to her family in New York City. She is a free spirit who helps Newland Archer see beyond narrow New York society. She treats her maid, Nastasia, as an equal, offering the servant her own cape before sending her out on an errand. She attends parties with disreputable people such as Julius Beaufort and Mrs. Lemuel Struthers, and she invites Newland, the fiancé of her cousin May, to visit her. Ellen suffers as much as Newland from their impossible love, but she is willing to live in emotional limbo so long as they can love each other at a distance. Ellen's love for Newland drives her important decisions: dropping divorce from Count Olenski, remaining in America, and offering Newland the choice of sexual consummation only once, and then disappearing from his life. Her conscience and responsibility to family complicate her love for Newland. When she learns of May's pregnancy, Ellen immediately decides to leave America, refusing Newland's attempt to follow her to Europe, and so allow cousin May to start her family with her husband Newland. The reception of Ellen's character has changed over time. From a willful temptress to a fabulously independent woman, far ahead of her time, one thing is for certain: “Ellen has only to walk alone across a drawing room to offend its definitions.”

=== Mrs. Manson Mingott ===
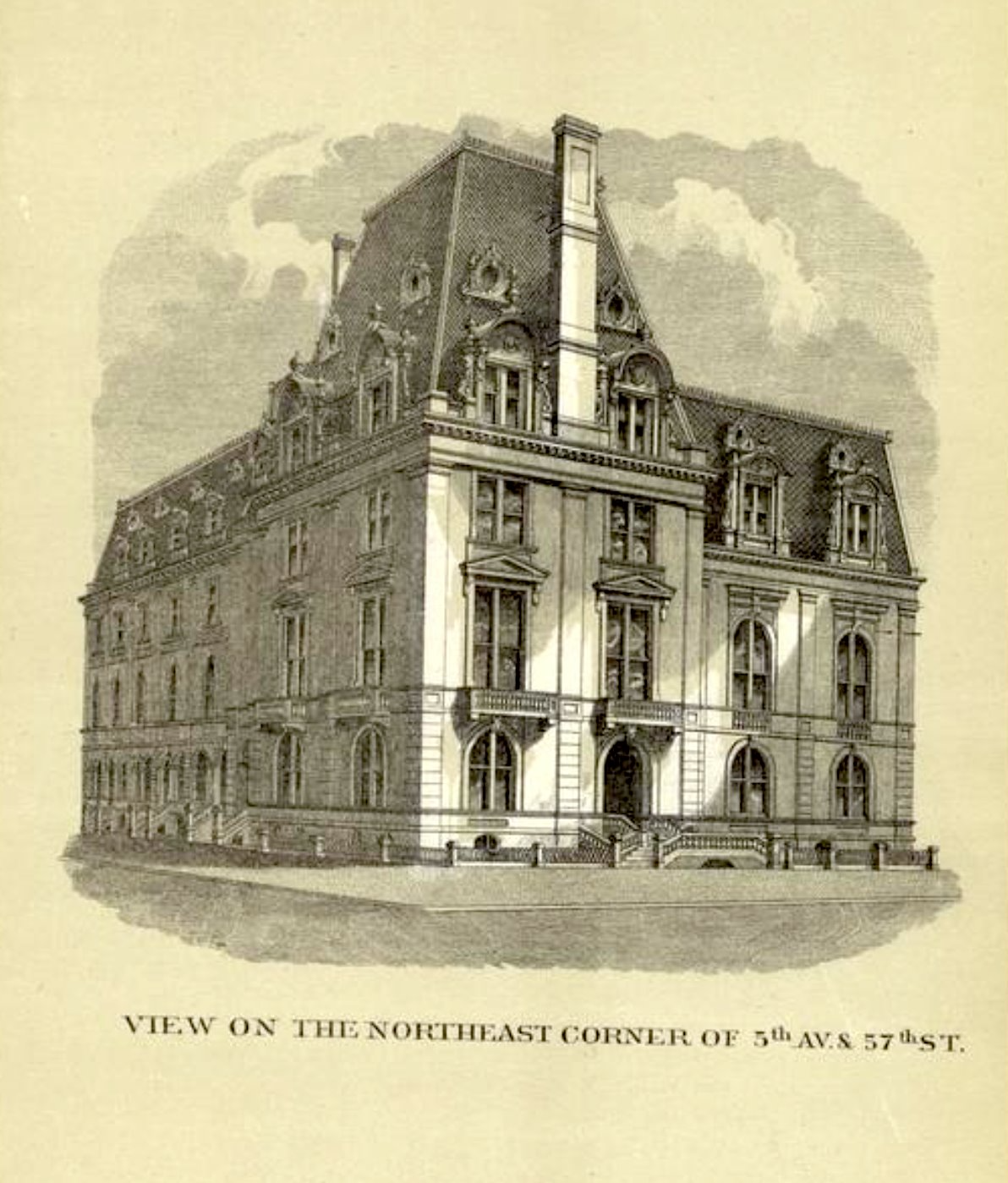
The home of the real-world Mrs. Manson Mingott, Mary Mason Jones, at the northeast corner of Fifth Avenue and 57th Street in Manhattan.

The matriarch of the powerful Mingott family, and grandmother to Ellen and May. She was born Catherine Spicer, to an inconsequential family. Widowed at 28, she has ensured her family's social position through her own shrewdness and force of character. She controls her family: at Newland's request, she has May and Mrs. Welland agree to an earlier wedding date. She controls the money—withholding Ellen's living allowance (when the family is angry with Ellen), and having niece Regina Beaufort ask for money when in financial trouble. Mrs. Mingott is a maverick in the polite world of New York society, at times pushing the boundaries of acceptable behavior, such as receiving guests in her house's ground floor, though society associates that practice with women of questionable morals. Her welcoming Ellen is viewed skeptically, and she insists the rest of the family support Ellen. Mrs. Mingott was inspired by Edith Wharton's own portly great-great-aunt, Mary Mason Jones, who is said to have given rise to the phrase "Keeping up with the Joneses", due to her belief that fashionable society would always strive to keep up with her.

=== Mrs. Augusta Welland ===
May's mother, who has raised her daughter to be a proper society lady. May's dullness, lack of imagination, and rigid views of appropriate and inappropriate behavior are a consequence of this influence. Augusta has effectively trained her husband, the weak-willed Mr. Welland, to conform to her desires and wishes. Mrs. Welland is the driving force behind May's commitment to a long engagement. Without her mother's influence, May might have agreed sooner to Newland's request for an earlier wedding date. After a few years of marriage, Newland Archer foresees in May the attributes of his mother-in-law — a woman who is stolid, unimaginative, and dull. Later he comes to experience the same molding by May which was imposed upon Mr. Welland.

== Themes ==
One of the most prominent themes that can be seen throughout the text is the idea of wealth and social class. The characters take pride in their social standings and those that come from "old money" feel threatened by those that are coming from "new money". The characters' lives revolve around staying up to date on the latest fashion, gatherings, appearances, etc. Being accepted by this high society is the most important thing to the people in this novel and they're willing to do anything to be accepted. Being accepted by high-class acquaintances is another common theme that is displayed throughout this novel. Another theme that is clear in the novel is love, whether it be the love between Newland Archer and May Welland, or the undeniable love and lust between Newland Archer and Ellen Olenska. Newland Archer's infatuation with May Welland's innocence can't be missed in the beginning scenes of the novel. The theme of innocence changes throughout the novel, as May states she is pregnant only to ensure that Ellen stays away from Newland.

== Changing perceptions of The Age of Innocence ==
Helen Killoran explains in The Critical Reception of Edith Wharton that critics have always admired Wharton's craftsmanship, her attention to structure, and her subtle ironies, along with her description of interiors (attributed to her time as an interior designer). In the decades since the book's publication, critics have placed more stress on the portrayal of money and class distinctions in the book.

Ellen Olenska and May Welland have also long been at the heart of critical discussion. Originally perceived as having done the right thing by talking about her pregnancy in order to save her marriage, May Welland can also be seen as manipulative rather than sympathetically desperate. Ellen Olenska brings up the general "woman question" in modern literary criticism.

Rather than focusing on the lavish lifestyle which Newland Archer has not had to work for, some modern readers identify with his grim outlook.

Hillary Kelly suggests that Wharton's "status made her story more than believable—it made the story real… Novelists before Wharton understood that storytelling was an act of exposure, but she built it into the architecture of The Age of Innocence and weaponized it."

== Adaptations ==
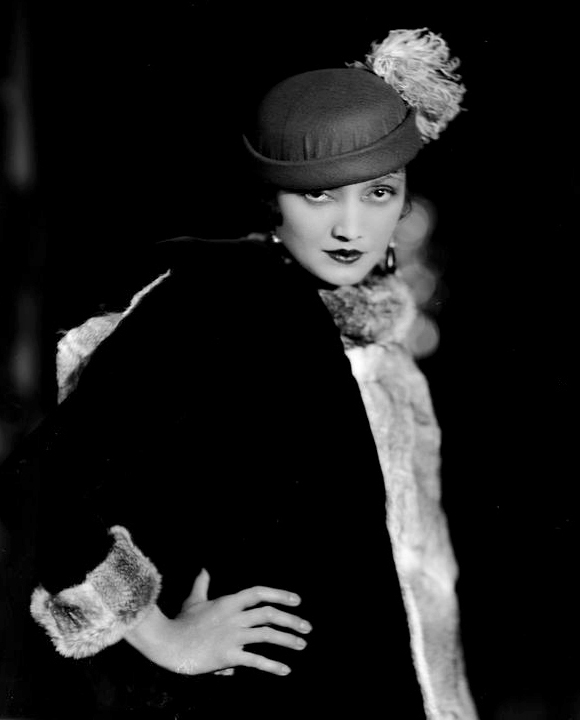
Katharine Cornell in the Broadway production of The Age of Innocence (1928)

- In 1924, a silent-film adaptation was released by Warner Brothers. Directed by Wesley Ruggles, it starred Beverly Bayne as Countess Olenska and Elliott Dexter as Newland Archer. This film is now lost.
- The Age of Innocence is a play in five scenes by Margaret Ayer Barnes that was adapted from Edith Wharton's novel; it premiered at the Teck Theatre in Buffalo, New York on November 12, 1928. It moved to Broadway's Empire Theatre where it opened on November 27, 1928.
- In 1934, a film adaptation was directed by Philip Moeller (based on both the novel and the play), starring Irene Dunne as Countess Olenska, and John Boles as Archer.
- In 1947, there was a Theatre Guild on the Air radio adaptation.
- In 1949, NBC University Theatre broadcast a dramatization.
- In 1993, Martin Scorsese directed a film adaptation.
- A BBC Radio adaptation was first broadcast in 2007.
- In 2018, The Age of Innocence was performed at Hartford Stage in Hartford, Connecticut. The show ran from April 5 to May 6, 2018, before the production moved to Princeton, New Jersey's McCarter Theatre for a run from September 7 to October 7, 2018.
- In 2024, the Old Globe Theatre in San Diego, CA, debuted their Globe-commissioned world première of a new adaptation.
- In 2025, Netflix ordered an upcoming series adaptation of the novel, screenwritten by Emma Frost, and starring Kristine Froseth as May Welland, Ben Radcliffe as Newland Archer, Camila Morrone as Ellen Olenska and Margo Martindale as Mrs. Manson-Mingott. It is set to premiere on February 18, 2027.
