= The Great Secret (serial) =

1917 film directed by Christy Cabanne

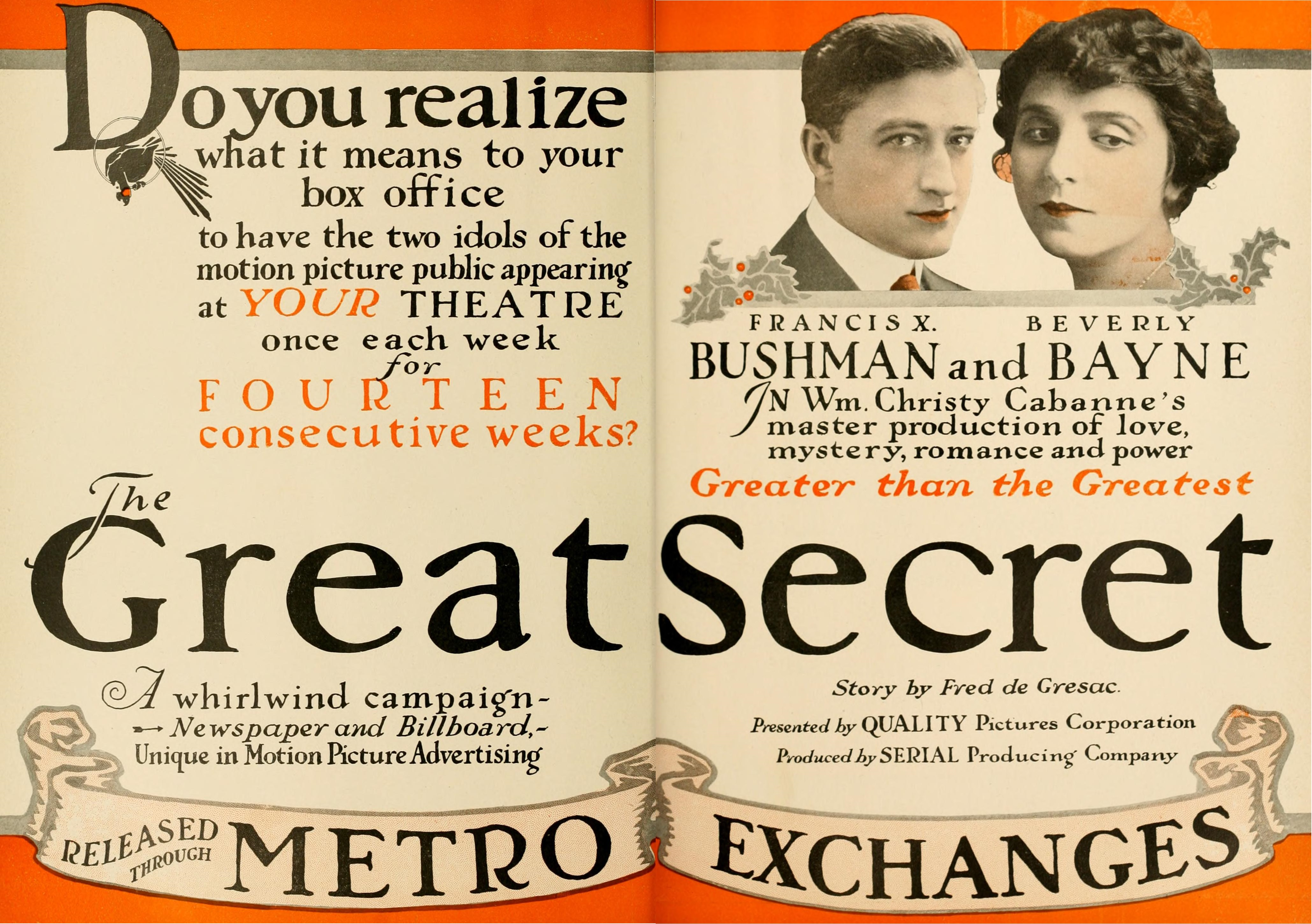
- herald style ad to the serial
- Directed by: Christy Cabanne
- Written by: Fred de Gresac
- Produced by: Quality Pictures Corporation; Louis B. Mayer; Christy Cabanne
- Starring: Francis X. Bushman; Beverly Bayne
- Cinematography: William Fildew
- Distributed by: Metro Pictures
- Release date: January 8, 1917
- Running time: 18 chapters
- Country: USA
- Language: Silent..English

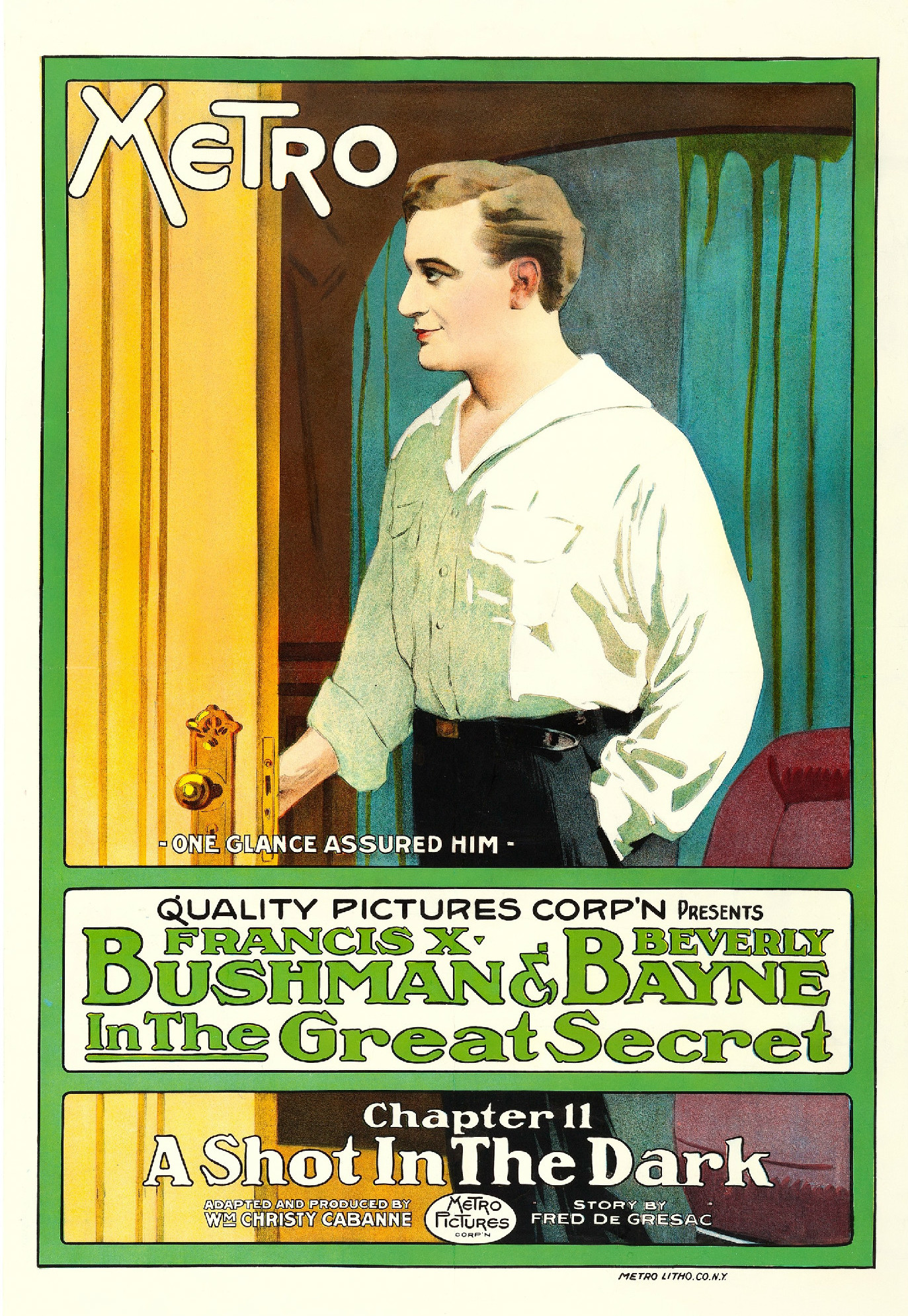
lobby poster Chapter 11.

The Great Secret is a 1917 American silent adventure serial film directed by Christy Cabanne and starring Francis X. Bushman and Beverly Bayne. It was produced independently by Louis B. Mayer and released through Metro Pictures. Mayer's first production credit.

It is now lost.

== Cast ==
- Francis X. Bushman - William Montgomery Strong
- Beverly Bayne - Beverly Clarke
- Fred R. Stanton - The Great Master
- Edward Connelly - Dr. Eulph
- Tom Blake - Bull Whalen
- Helen Dunbar - Jane Warren
- Sue Balfour - Mrs. Clarke
- Belle Bruce - Sava Laring
- Dorothy Haydel - Eunice Manton
- William J. Butler - Tom Clarke
- Charles Ripley - The Spider
- Artie Ortego - The Rat
- Charles Fang
- Tammany Young
- Jack J. Clark - Beverly's uncle
