= God's Outlaw =

God's Outlaw may refer to:

- God's Outlaw (1919 film), 1919 silent American film directed by Christy Cabanne
- God's Outlaw (1986 film), a 1986 British historical film directed by Tony Tew
