= The Age of Innocence (1924 film) =

1924 film directed by Wesley Ruggles

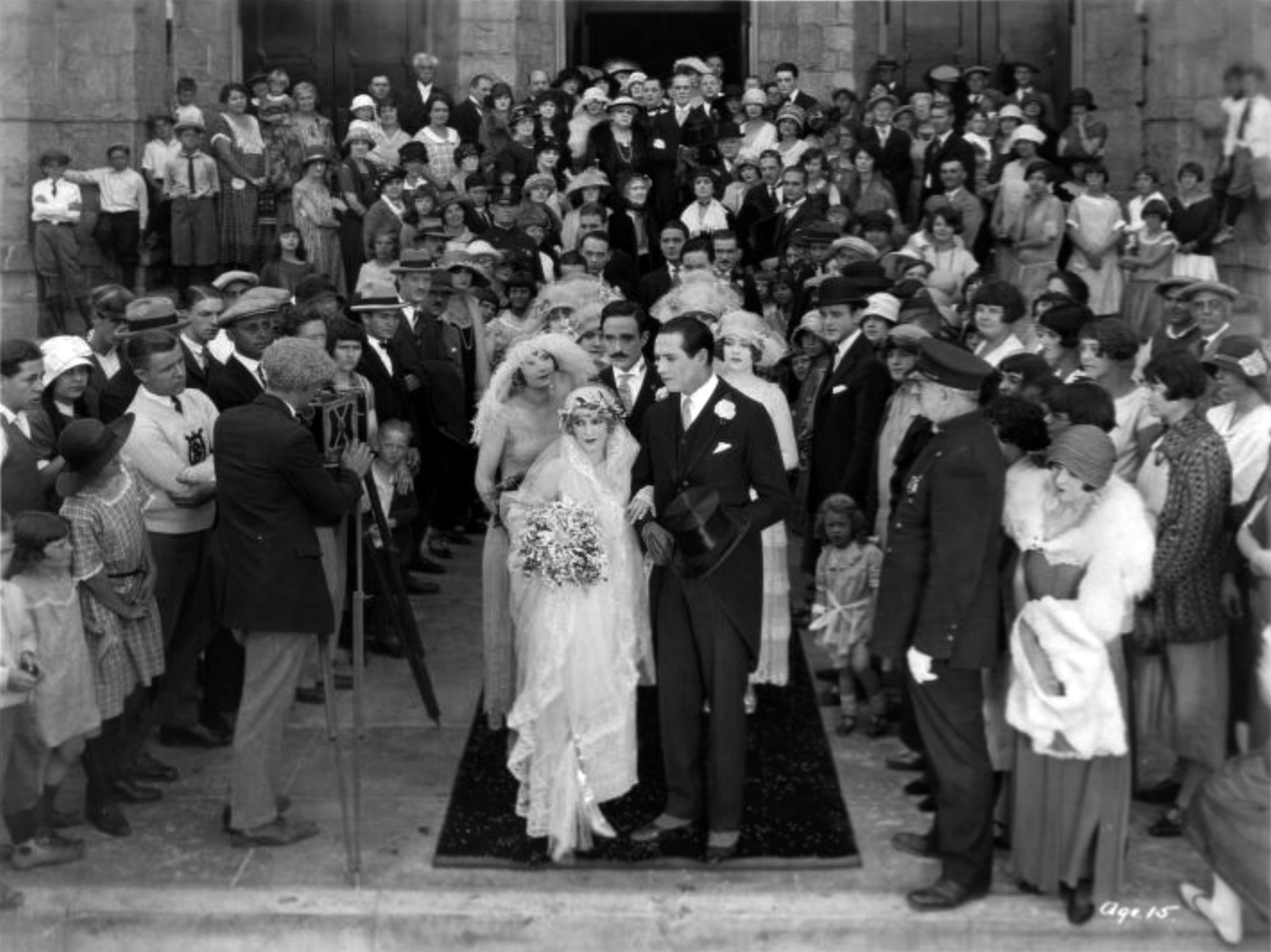
- Wedding scene from the film
- Directed by: Wesley Ruggles
- Screenplay by: Olga Printzlau
- Based on: The Age of Innocence (1920 novel) by Edith Wharton
- Starring: Beverly Bayne; Elliott Dexter; Edith Roberts; Willard Louis
- Production company: Warner Bros.
- Distributed by: Warner Bros.
- Release date: November 1, 1924
- Running time: 7 reels
- Country: United States
- Languages: Silent; English intertitles

The Age of Innocence is a 1924 American silent film directed by Wesley Ruggles. It is the first film adaptation of Edith Wharton's 1920 novel The Age of Innocence. It was produced and distributed by Warner Bros.

== Plot ==
Newland Archer is engaged to May Mingott of a prominent New York family. Shortly after the engagement is announced, Newland finds himself attracted to May's older married cousin Countess Ellen Olenska. After his marriage to May, Newland and Ellen agree to run away together. Before this can happen, May visits her husband's lover and informs her that she is expecting a child. Ellen and Newland part ways, Newland vowing to be a better husband to his wife May.

== Cast ==
- Beverly Bayne as Countess Ellen Olanska
- Edith Roberts as May Mingott
- Elliott Dexter as Newland Archer
- Willard Louis as Cornelius Beaufort
- Fred Huntley
- Gertrude Norman
- Sigrid Holmquist

== Preservation status ==
In February 1956, Jack L. Warner sold the rights to all of his pre-December 1949 films to Associated Artists Productions. In 1969, UA donated 16mm prints of some Warner Bros. films from outside United States. No copies of The Age of Innocence are known to exist. Therefore it is considered a lost film.

== Legacy ==
- In 1928, Margaret Ayer Barnes adapted the novel into a play, first produced on Broadway, starring Katharine Cornell as Countess Ellen Olenska.
- In 1934 an adaptation of the novel was directed by Philip Moeller. It was released by RKO Radio Pictures and stars Irene Dunne as Countess Ellen Olenska, John Boles as Newland Archer, Julie Haydon as May Welland Archer, Lionel Atwill, and Helen Westley.
- In 1993 an adaptation of the novel was directed by Martin Scorsese. It was released by Columbia Pictures and stars Michelle Pfeiffer as Countess Ellen Olenska, Daniel Day-Lewis as Newland Archer, Winona Ryder as May Welland Archer, Richard E. Grant, and Miriam Margolyes. Ryder won a Golden Globe Award for her portrayal of May Welland Archer, and the film won an Oscar for costume design.
