= A Pair of Cupids =

1918 silent film directed by Charles Brabin

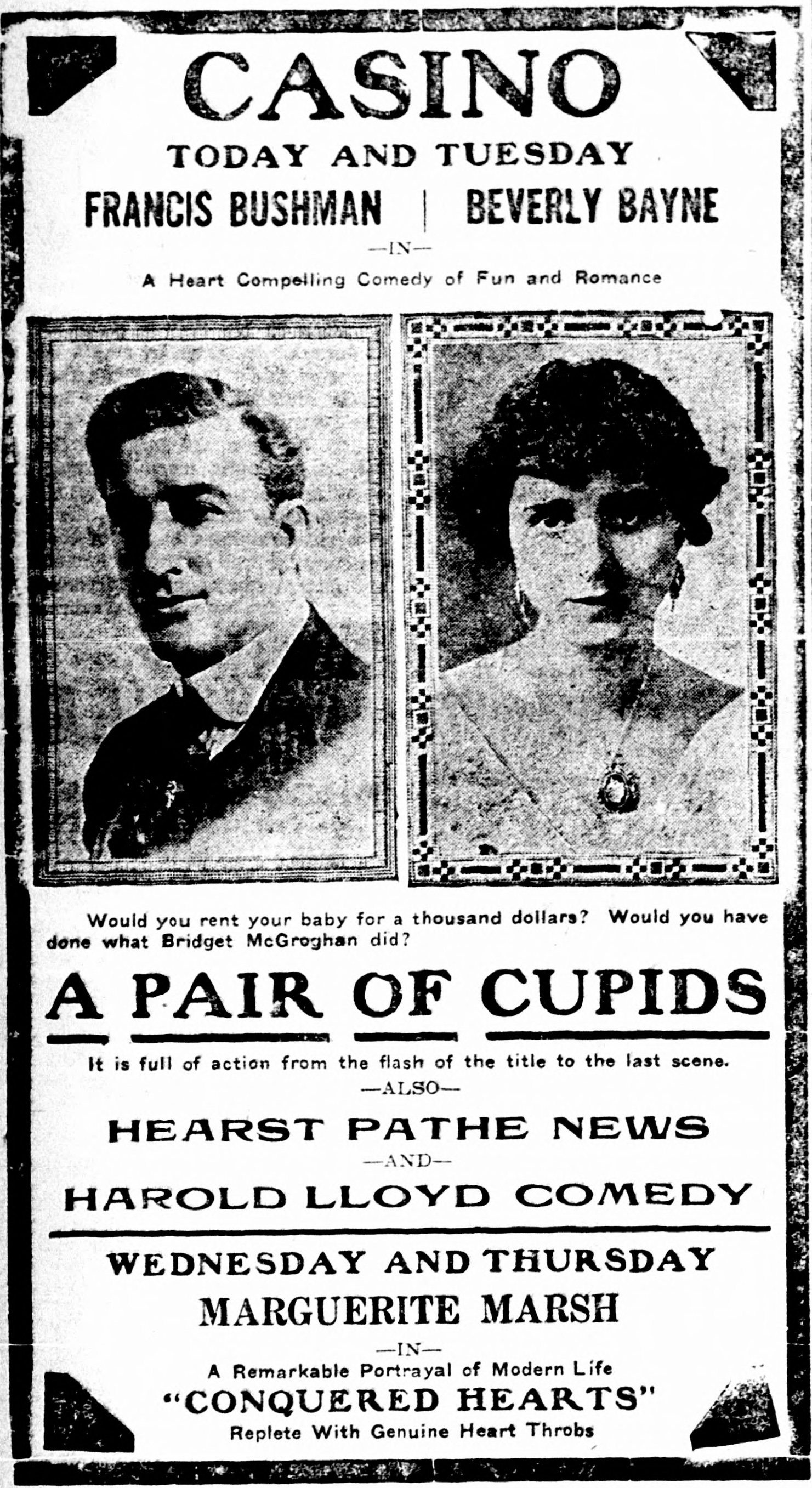
- Contemporary advertisement
- Directed by: Charles Brabin
- Written by: Luther A. Reed
- Produced by: Maxwell Karger
- Starring: Francis X. Bushman; Beverly Bayne; Charles Sutton
- Cinematography: R. J. Bergquist
- Production company: Metro Pictures
- Release date: July 29, 1918 (US)
- Running time: 5 reels
- Country: United States
- Language: English

A Pair of Cupids, also known by its pre-release title of Both Members, is a 1918 American silent comedy-drama film, directed by Charles Brabin. It stars Francis X. Bushman, Beverly Bayne, and Charles Sutton, and was released on July 29, 1918.

== Cast list ==
- Francis X. Bushman as Peter Warburton
- Beverly Bayne as Virginia Parke
- Charles Sutton as Henry Burgess
- Gerald Griffin as Michael McGroghan
- Jessie Stevens as Bridget McGroghan
- Edgar Norton as Martin
- Lou Gorey as Marie
- Mrs. Turner as Lizette
- Thomas Blake as Bat Small
- Louis Wolheim as Dirk Thomas
- John Judge as John Henry McGroghan
- Elwell Judge as Mary Ann McGroghan
