= With Neatness and Dispatch =

1918 American silent film directed by William Senderling Davis

- Directed by: Will S. Davis
- Written by: June Mathis; Luther Reed
- Based on: the short story, "With Neatness and Dispatch" by Kenneth L. Roberts
- Produced by: Maxwell Karger
- Starring: Francis X. Bushman; Beverly Bayne; Frank Currier
- Cinematography: John Arnold
- Production company: Metro Pictures
- Release date: April 15, 1918 (US)
- Running time: 5 reels
- Country: United States
- Language: English

With Neatness and Dispatch is a 1918 American silent comedy film directed by Will S. Davis and starring Francis X. Bushman, Beverly Bayne, and Frank Currier. It was released on April 15, 1918.

== Cast list ==
- Francis X. Bushman as Paul Donaldson
- Beverly Bayne as Geraldine Ames
- Frank Currier as Roger Burgess
- Walter Miller as John Pierce
- Hugh Jeffrey as Inspector Corcoran
- Sylvia Arnold as Mary Ames
- Ricca Allen as Aunt Letitia
- Adella Barker as Fanny
- John Charles as "Slim" Keegan
- Arthur Housman as Burns
- Sidney D'Albrook as Daly
