= Helen Dunbar =

American actress

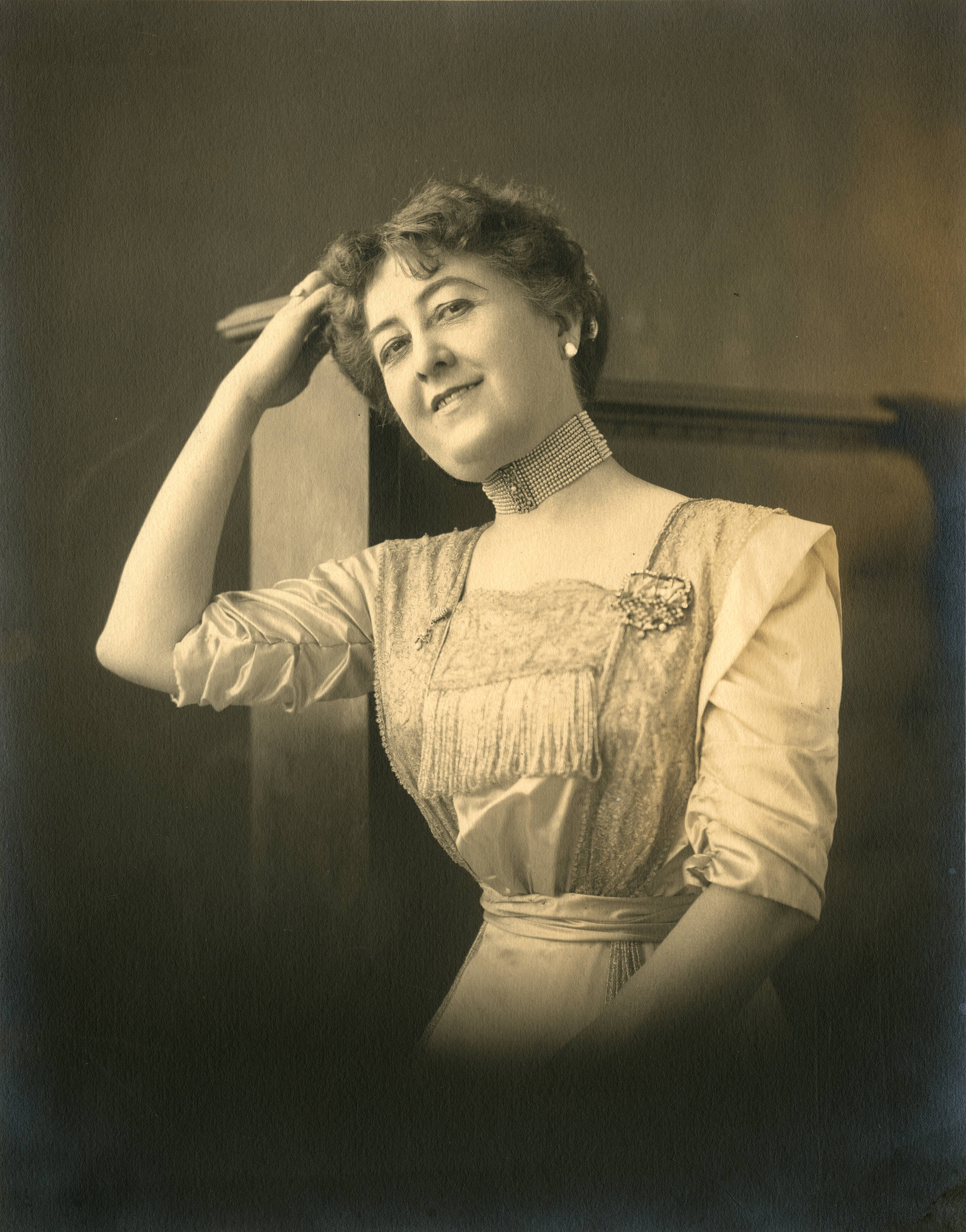
- Born: Katheryn Burke Lackey; October 10, 1863; Philadelphia, Pennsylvania, U.S.
- Died: August 28, 1933 (aged 69); Los Angeles, California, U.S.
- Resting place: Hollywood Forever Cemetery
- Occupation: Actress
- Years active: 1899–1926

Helen Dunbar (born Katheryn Burke Lackey; October 10, 1863 – August 28, 1933) was an American theatrical performer and silent film actress.

== Career ==
Born in Philadelphia, Pennsylvania, Dunbar first appeared with the Weber & Fields Stock Company, when it began its career on the New York stage. In 1899 she appeared in Whirl-i-gig and The Other Way at the Weber and Fields' Broadway Music Hall. She also worked with the Charles Dillingham Company and the Boston Opera Company. She appeared in motion pictures beginning in 1912 and continued until 1926. Her stage and screen career extended over thirty-five years.

Dunbar's film career started with Out of the Depths (1912). The production starred Francis X. Bushman. She became a leading lady for the old Essanay Studios. For a number of years she was under contract to Famous Players–Lasky. Aside from Bushman, Dunbar made films with stars like Harry Cashman, Richard Carroll, Ruth Stonehouse, Beverly Bayne, Frank Keenan, John Gilbert, Mary Astor, Phyllis Haver, Norma Talmadge, and Noah Beery. Her final movie was Stranded in Paris (1926), which featured Bebe Daniels and Tom Ricketts.

== Death ==
Dunbar died of complications of arthritis in 1933 at the home of her daughter, 1203 Poinsettia Place, Los Angeles, California. Her funeral was conducted from Pierce Brothers' Mortuary with interment at Hollywood Forever Cemetery.

== Partial filmography ==
- Dear Old Girl (1913)
- One Wonderful Night (1914)
- The Ambition of the Baron (1915)
- Graustark (1915)
- The Second in Command (1915)
- The Silent Voice (1915)
- Man and His Soul (1916)
- A Corner in Cotton (1916)
- A Million A Minute (1916)
- A Virginia Romance (1916)
- Molly Entangled (1917)
- The Shuttle (1918)
- Blindfolded (1918)
- Cyclone Higgins, D.D. (1918)
- Maid o' the Storm (1918)
- More Trouble (1918)
- Inside the Lines (1918)
- Hitting the High Spots (1918)
- The Squaw Man (1918)
- Jane Goes A-Wooing (1919)
- All Wrong (1919)
- Venus in the East (1919)
- The Winning Girl (1919)
- Common Clay (1919)
- Josselyn's Wife (1919)
- Fires of Faith (1919)
- Men, Women, and Money (1919)
- Fighting Through (1919)
- God's Outlaw (1919)
- Young Mrs. Winthrop (1920)
- The City of Masks (1920)
- You Never Can Tell (1920)
- Behold My Wife! (1920)
- The Furnace (1920)
- Sham (1921)
- Sacred and Profane Love (1921)
- The Great Moment (1921)
- Her Winning Way (1921)
- The Law and the Woman (1922)
- The Man of Courage (1922)
- The World's Champion (1922)
- Beyond the Rocks (1922)
- The Impossible Mrs. Bellew (1922)
- Thirty Days (1922)
- The Cheat (1923)
- The Call of the Canyon (1923)
- Three Weeks (1924)
- The Fighting Coward (1924)
- Changing Husbands (1924)
- New Lives for Old (1925)
- She Wolves (1925)
- Siege (1925)
- His Majesty, Bunker Bean (1925)
- Compromise (1925)
- Lady Windermere's Fan (1925)
- Rose of the World (1925)
- The Reckless Sex (1925)
- His Jazz Bride (1926)
- The Beautiful Cheat (1926)
- The Man Upstairs (1926)
- Fine Manners (1926)
- Meet the Prince (1926)
- Stranded in Paris (1926)
