= Under Suspicion (1918 film) =

1918 American film by Will S. Davis

- Directed by: Will S. Davis
- Written by: Albert Shelby Le Vino
- Based on: "The Woolworth Diamonds" by Hugh C. Weir
- Produced by: Metro Pictures
- Starring: Francis X. Bushman; Beverly Bayne
- Cinematography: Rudolph Bergquist
- Distributed by: Metro Pictures
- Release date: February 4, 1918
- Running time: 5 reels
- Country: United States
- Language: Silent (English intertitles)

Under Suspicion is a 1918 American silent film comedy-mystery directed by Will S. Davis and starring Francis X. Bushman and Beverly Bayne. Based upon the short story "The Woolworth Diamonds" by Hugh C. Weir that appeared in The Saturday Evening Post, it was produced and distributed by Metro Pictures.

This is a lost film.

== Plot ==
As described in a film magazine, Gerry Simpson meets newspaper reporter Virginia Blake and, after learning that she has no use for the idle rich, decides to become a reporter and make Virginia believe he is poor in order to win her. Both are very happy until Virginia comes to believe that Gerry is responsible for a series of robberies that have occurred at fashionable functions. She goes to his apartment but is interrupted by Gerry's valet. Gerry arrives home in time to save Virginia from the wrath of the crooked valet and after the thief is brought to justice, Virginia, convinced of Gerry's innocence, promises to marry him.

== Cast ==
- Francis X. Bushman as Gerry Simpson
- Beverly Bayne as Virginia Blake
- Eva Gordon as Mrs. Alice Woolworth
- Hugh Jeffrey as Rogers
- Frank Montgomery as Sweeney
- Sidney D'Albrook as Murphy
- Arthur Housman as Red Hogan
- Jack Newton as Cassidy
- Franklyn Hanna as Chief of detectives

== Reception ==
Like many American films of the time, Under Suspicion was subject to cuts by city and state film censorship boards. The Chicago Board of Censors required cuts, in Reel 2, of the stealing from a safe, examining the loot after the valet gets home, and, in Reel 5, the stealing of a necklace.
