= The Voice of Conscience (1917 film) =

1917 US silent film directed by Edwin Carewe

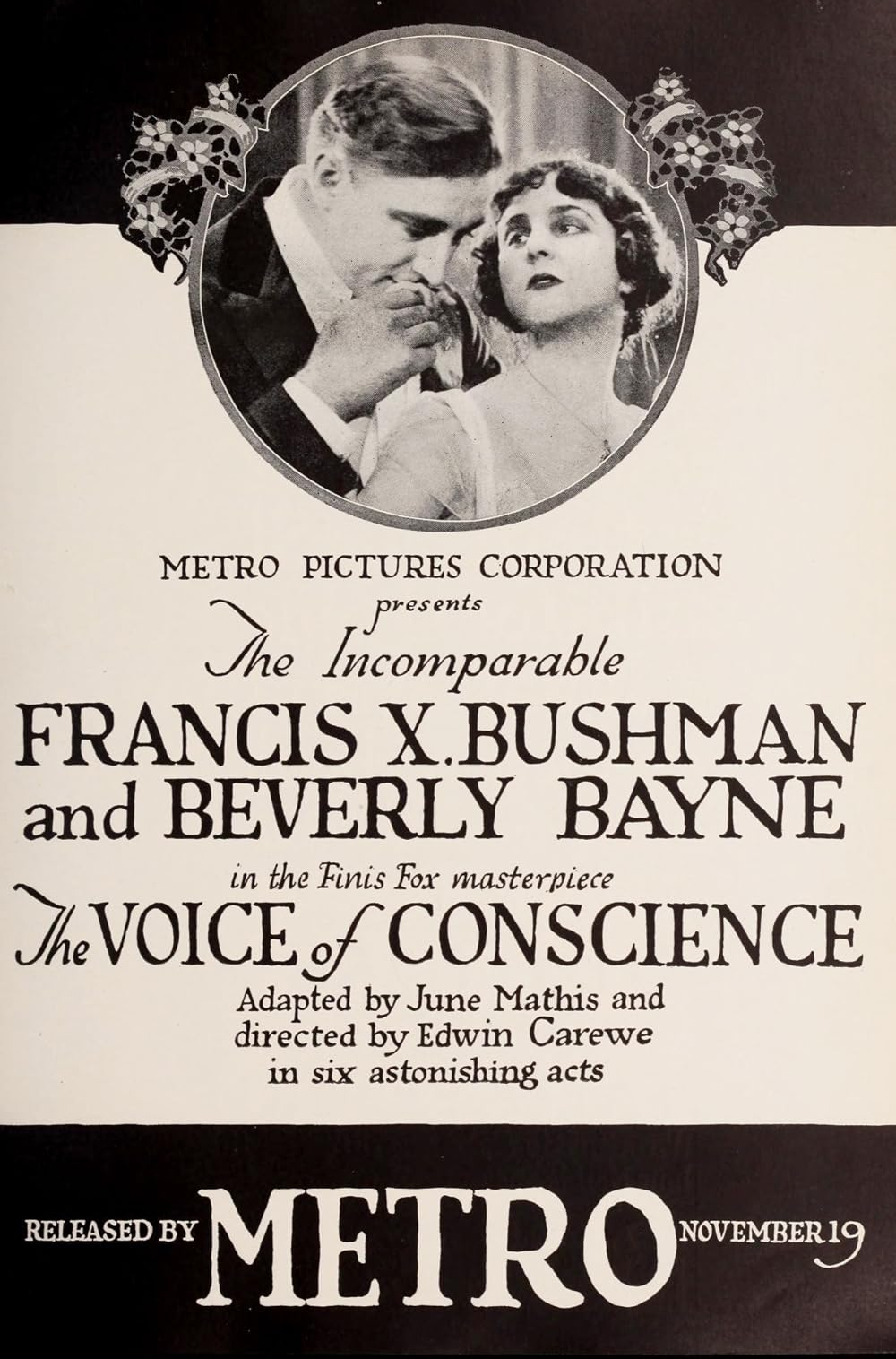
- Movie poster of The Voice of Conscience
- Directed by: Edwin Carewe
- Screenplay by: June Mathis (scenario)
- Story by: Finis Fox
- Produced by: B. A. Rolfe
- Starring: Francis X. Bushman; Beverly Bayne; Harry S. Northrup
- Cinematography: R. J. Bergquist
- Production company: Metro Pictures
- Release date: November 19, 1917 (US)
- Running time: 5-6 reels
- Country: United States
- Language: Silent (English intertitles)

The Voice of Conscience is a 1917 American silent drama film directed by Edwin Carewe and starring Francis X. Bushman, Beverly Bayne, and Harry S. Northrup. It was released on November 19, 1917.

The movie was at least partially filmed at the "dilapidated nineteenth-century mansion" called the Hermitage, just outside Savannah, Georgia, which served as the home of Beverly Bayne's character. Carewe hired over 200 African Americans in the Savannah area to play extras, likely in stereotypical Southern plantation scenes as enslaved people picking cotton in the field.

== Synopsis ==
The story follows William Potter, who has been "framed" by Dick Liggett, and sent to jail for a crime he did not commit. Occupying an adjoining cell is James Houston, who is really guilty. There is a remarkable resemblance between the two men. Houston urges Potter to go to his home, and take his place, as his mother, whose eyesight has failed is near death. Houston cannot go as he has a few months yet to serve. He points out that his sister was only a little girl when he left home, and his mother, almost blind, will not recognize a difference between the two men.

While staying with the family, Potter begins to fall in love this Houston's sister, Allane. Liggett, who is living under the alias Stephen Johnson, becomes overly familiar with Allane, and when he tries to kiss her, she lashes him with her whip. When she reaches home, she tells Potter of the occurrence, and he goes to Johnson's office and thrashes him. Crazy Pete comes in while Johnson is suffering from his blows. At the sight of Johnson's lacerated face, Pete runs in terror, dropping the mail in his haste. Johnson sees and opens a letter from the real James Houston to his impersonator, saying that he is returning. Johnson exposes Potter, denouncing him to Allane, but she refuses to believe him. However, now released from his promise by Mrs. Houston's death, Potter tells Allane his identity and confesses his love, which, while initially surprised, she returns. He promises her that he will clean himself from the charge upon which he was jailed, before marrying.

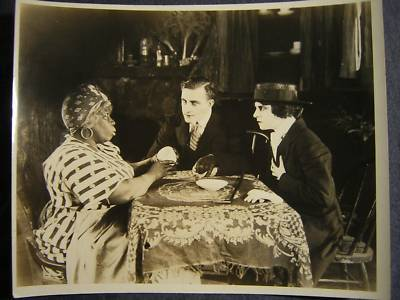
movie still featuring Pauline Dempsey (left), Francis X. Bushman (center) and Beverly Bayne (right).

In the meantime the real Jim Houston is on his way home. Pete and Johnson, hiding in ambush, see him approaching. They think it is Potter and Pete is afraid to shoot, so Johnson does the deed himself. Potter rushes out and finds Houston, and Johnson hurries to the police to accuse Potter of the murder.

On the night before the jury are to return the verdict, Aunt Jenny uses a voodoo charm to make Pete tell the truth, and he confesses. Johnson tries to jump out of the window to escape punishment, but the sheriff stops him and he dies of the wound. In the end, Potter and Allane are united, with no barrier to their love to come between them.

== Cast list ==
- Francis X. Bushman as William Potter/James Houston
- Beverly Bayne as Allane Houston
- Harry S. Northrup as Dick Liggett
- Maggie Breyer as Mrs. Wallace Houston
- Pauline Dempsey as Aunt Jennie
- Walter Broussard as Crazy Pete
- Anthony Byrd as Uncle Mose

== Preservation ==
There is a complete print of The Voice of Conscience held by the Museum of Modern Art.
