= Fred R. Stanton =

American Actor

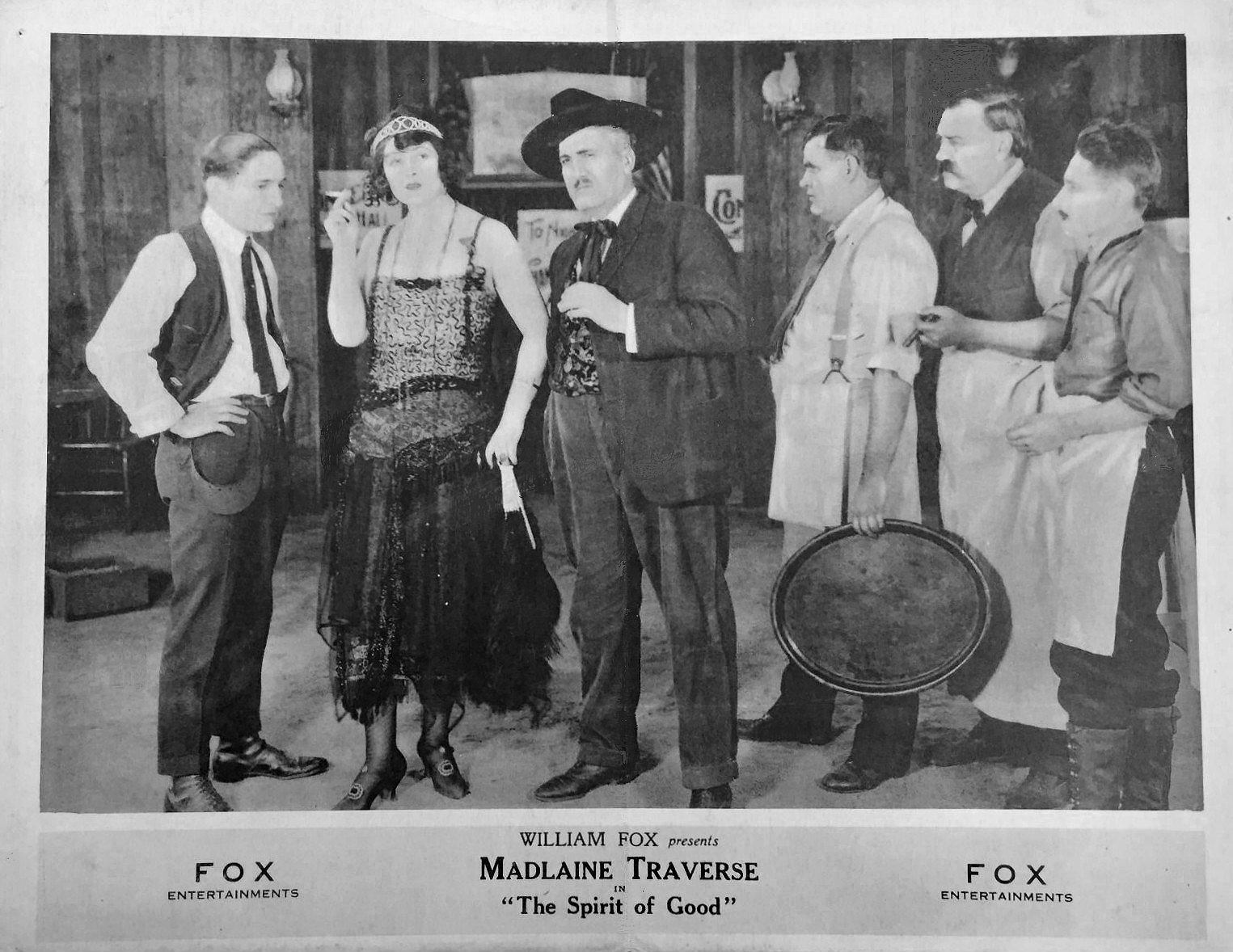
The Spirit of Good lobby card

Fred R. Stanton, born Frederick R. Schwerd, (1881–May 27, 1925) was an actor in the United States. He had numerous film roles and also performed in theater.

He portrays a Native American in The Son of the Wolf and has a memorable knife fight with the star. He died on May 27, 1925, in Los Angeles of stomach cancer.

== Filmography ==
- Daredevil Kate (1916) as Bently
- The Great Secret (1917) as The Great Master
- De Luxe Annie (1918) as Detective Cronin
- The Great Victory (1919) as Sergeant Gross
- The Great Secret (serial) (1920), a serial as The Great Master
- The Fighting Chance (1920) as Beverly Plank
- The Spirit of Good (1920) as Neal Bradford
- Jenny Be Good (1920) as Aaron Shuttles
- The Silver Horde (1920) as big George Bolt
- The Fire Bride (1922)
- Her Sturdy Oak (1921) as Ranch Foreman
- Perils of the Yukon (1922), a serial as Ivan Petroff
- The Son of the Wolf (1922)
- Danger Ahead (1923)
- Little Church Around the Corner (1923) as The Sheriff
- A Million to Burn (1923) as Langden
- Canyon of the Fools (1923) as Jim Harper / Polhill
- Trifling with Honor (1923) as Lute Clotz
- When a Man's a Man (1924) as Nick Cambert
- Find Your Man (1924) as Sheriff
