= Richard Washburn Child =

American diplomat

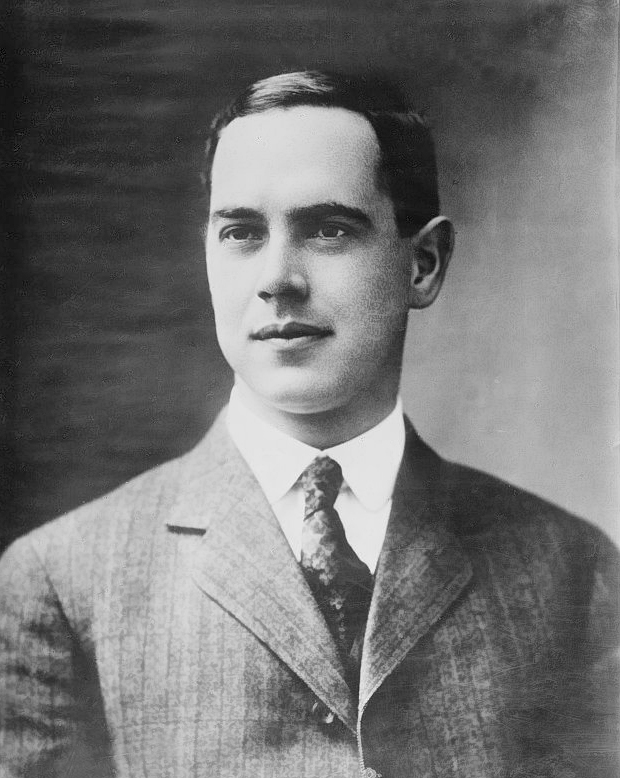

United States Ambassador to Italy
- In office July 28, 1921 – January 20, 1924
- President: Warren G. Harding; Calvin Coolidge
- Preceded by: Robert Underwood Johnson
- Succeeded by: Henry P. Fletcher

Personal details
- Born: August 5, 1881 Worcester, Massachusetts, U.S.
- Died: January 31, 1935 (aged 53) New York City, U.S.
- Education: Harvard University; Harvard Law School

Richard Washburn Child (August 5, 1881 – January 31, 1935) was an American author and diplomat. Both during and after his service as United States Ambassador to Italy, he was a well-known promoter of fascism, in particular Italian Fascism, in the early 20th century.

== Early life and career ==
Born in Worcester, Massachusetts, in 1881, Child went to Harvard University and Law School where he graduated in 1906 to become a business lawyer. Child founded the Progressive Republican League in Massachusetts, a forerunner of the Progressive Party. During World War I, he worked first as a correspondent in Europe and Russia, then for the U.S. Treasury, writing propaganda.

In 1916 he published a book, calling for U.S. investment in Russia. After the war he became editor of Collier's Weekly (1919).

In 1919 and 1920, Francis X. Bushman and Beverly Bayne successfully toured the play The Master Thief, based on a story by Child.

In 1920 he wrote campaign material for Presidential candidate Warren G. Harding, who rewarded him with the ambassadorship in Italy (from May 1921 to February 1924), where among other diplomatic activities he encouraged Benito Mussolini to start his March on Rome, as he records in his memoir A Diplomat looks at Europe (1925). He also promoted U.S. investment in Italy under Mussolini, especially from the J. P. Morgan bank. After his return to the United States, he became editor for The Saturday Evening Post and served on the National Crime Commission in 1925. In 1926 he divorced.

In 1928 he became a paid propaganda writer for Benito Mussolini, whose notes he ghostwrote and serialized as My Autobiography in The Saturday Evening Post, and whose politics he praised in numerous articles for the Hearst press. My Autobiography was published in America in 1928 by Charles Scribner's Sons, and in England in 1936 by Hurst and Blackett (the title page of the Hurst and Blackett edition says "11th thousand"). Together with Thomas W. Lamont he rates as one of the most influential American promoters of Italian Fascism until his death in 1935. Child also wrote a number of crime stories and promotional tracts throughout his career. His Paymaster stories, in which his anti-hero - a criminal dubbed “the Paymaster” - regularly outwitted his opponents, including the police, and other more dangerous villains, were widely known in the first decades of the 20th century.

Child was a critic of spiritualism and skeptical of paranormal claims. In his article The Will to Believe he dismissed the medium Eusapia Palladino as a fraud.

On January 31, 1935, Child died of pneumonia in New York City. Following a deathbed conversion to Catholicism, his funeral Mass was held at the Church of St. Vincent Ferrer.

== Publications ==
- Jim Hands (1911)
- The Blue Wall (1912)
- Potential Russia (1916)
- The Vanishing Men (1920)
- The Velvet Black (1921)
- The Will to Believe (1921)
- The Hands of Nara (1922)
- Fresh Waters and Other Stories (1924)
- A Diplomat Looks at Europe (1925)
- Battling the Criminal (1925)
- My Autobiography (1928) [By Benito Mussolini with a Foreword by Richard Washburn Child]
- The Writing on the Wall: Who Shall Govern Us Next? (1929)

Diplomatic posts
Preceded by Robert Underwood Johnson	United States Ambassador to Italy; 1921–1924	Succeeded by Henry P. Fletcher
