= Their Compact =

1917 film

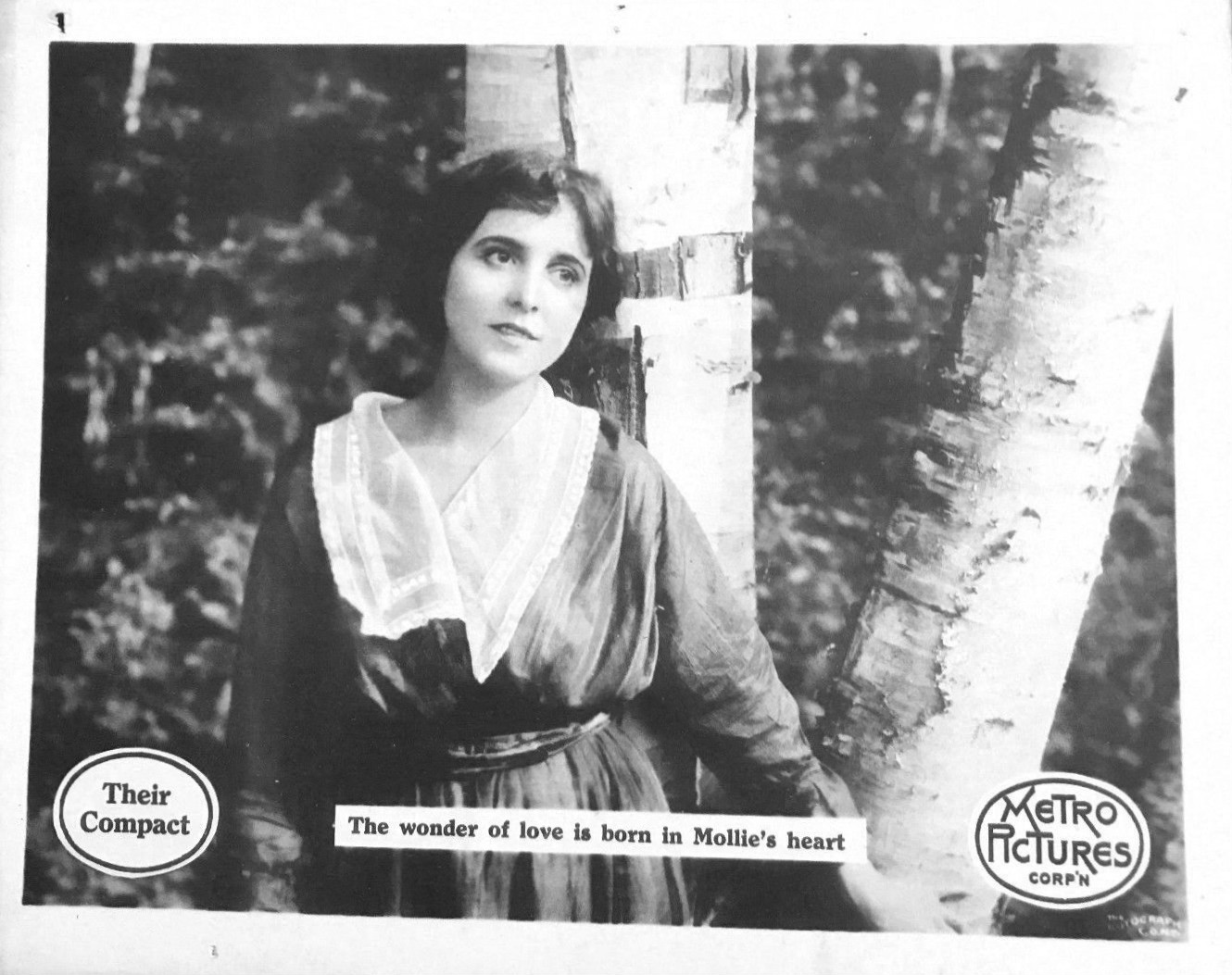
- Directed by: Edwin Carewe
- Written by: Charles A. Logue (story); Albert S. Le Vino (scenario)
- Starring: Francis X. Bushman; Beverly Bayne
- Cinematography: R. J. Bergquist
- Production company: Metro Pictures
- Distributed by: Metro Pictures
- Release date: September 17, 1917
- Running time: 7 reels
- Country: United States
- Languages: Silent; English intertitles

Their Compact is a 1917 American silent Western film produced and distributed by Metro Pictures and directed by Edwin Carewe. The film stars Francis X. Bushman and Beverly Bayne, a popular romantic screen duo at the time.

== Plot ==
As described in a film magazine, Jim (Bushman) goes west to forget an affair with a vivacious but heartless eastern girl. He is wounded by a gang of toughs who try to scare him away from his mine, and Mollie (Bayne) nurses him until he recovers. Verda (Adams), his former sweetheart, comes west as the wife of his chum Bob (Mortimer). While Bob places his wife in Jim's care and leaves on a business trip, Verda plans to run away with the leader of the thugs, who has stolen the gold from Jim's mine. However, the early return of Jim frustrates her plans, so she accuses Jim of insulting her. Bob then swears that he will kill Jim, but is shot by the gang leader. Verda and the gangster leave, but Jim overtakes them and brings Verda back to her dying husband. She is then driven out of town, and Jim and Mollie have a happy reunion.

== Cast ==
- Francis X. Bushman - James Van Dyke Moore
- Beverly Bayne - Mollie Anderson
- Henry Mortimer - Robert Forrest
- Harry S. Northrup - 'Ace High' Norton
- Mildred Adams - Verda Forrest
- Robert Chandler - 'Pop' Anderson
- John Smiley - Peters
- Thomas Delmar - 'Pay Dirt' Thompson

== Reception ==
Like many American films of the time, Their Compact was subject to cuts by city and state film censorship boards. The Chicago Board of Censors directed that two shooting scenes at the cabin during a fight be cut.

== Preservation ==
With no prints of Their Compact located in any film archives, it is considered a lost film.
