= The Ambition of the Baron =

1915 film

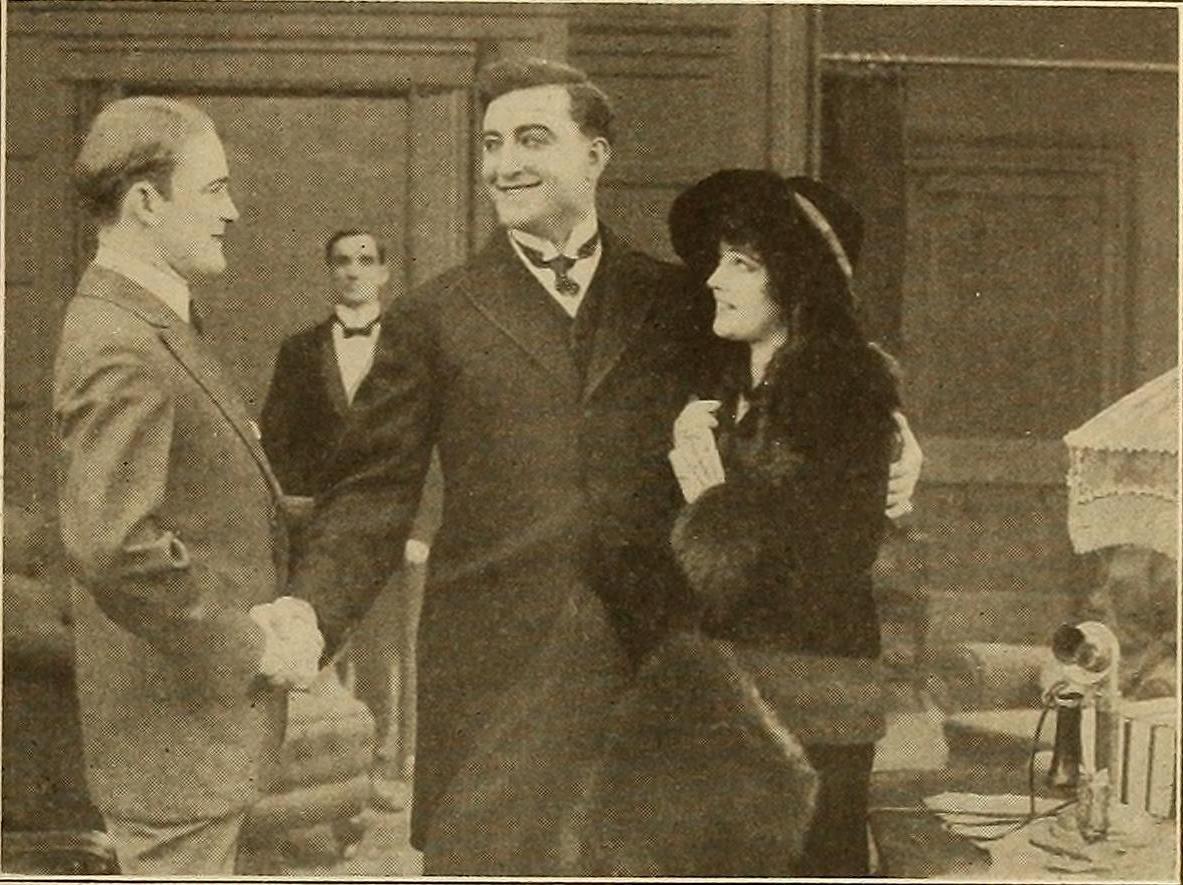
- Based on: The Ambition of the Baron by Marvin Dana
- Starring: Francis X. Bushman
- Production company: Essanay Studios
- Distributed by: General Film Company
- Release date: January 29, 1915
- Running time: 2 reels
- Country: United States
- Language: Silent with English intertitles

The Ambition of the Baron is a 1915 American silent short drama film. The film was based on the story of the same name by Marvin Dana, which was first published in The Smart Set Magazine. Gloria Swanson had a bit-part role.

== Plot ==
According to a film magazine, "Baron von Tollen, a master hand at politics and intrigue, wishes to control Leutala, a small continental country. He picks the Count Jean de Lugnan as the man he wishes to make the king. In order to get him interested, the Baron has his beautiful daughter, Annetta, flee past the Count one night in a cab. She looks out of the window and drops a note reading "Follow me and save me." The Count is ever ready to risk his life to rescue beauty in distress, so follows in another cab to a country estate just outside of London.* He scales the wall and finds the girl, climbs back over the wall and takes her to her home.

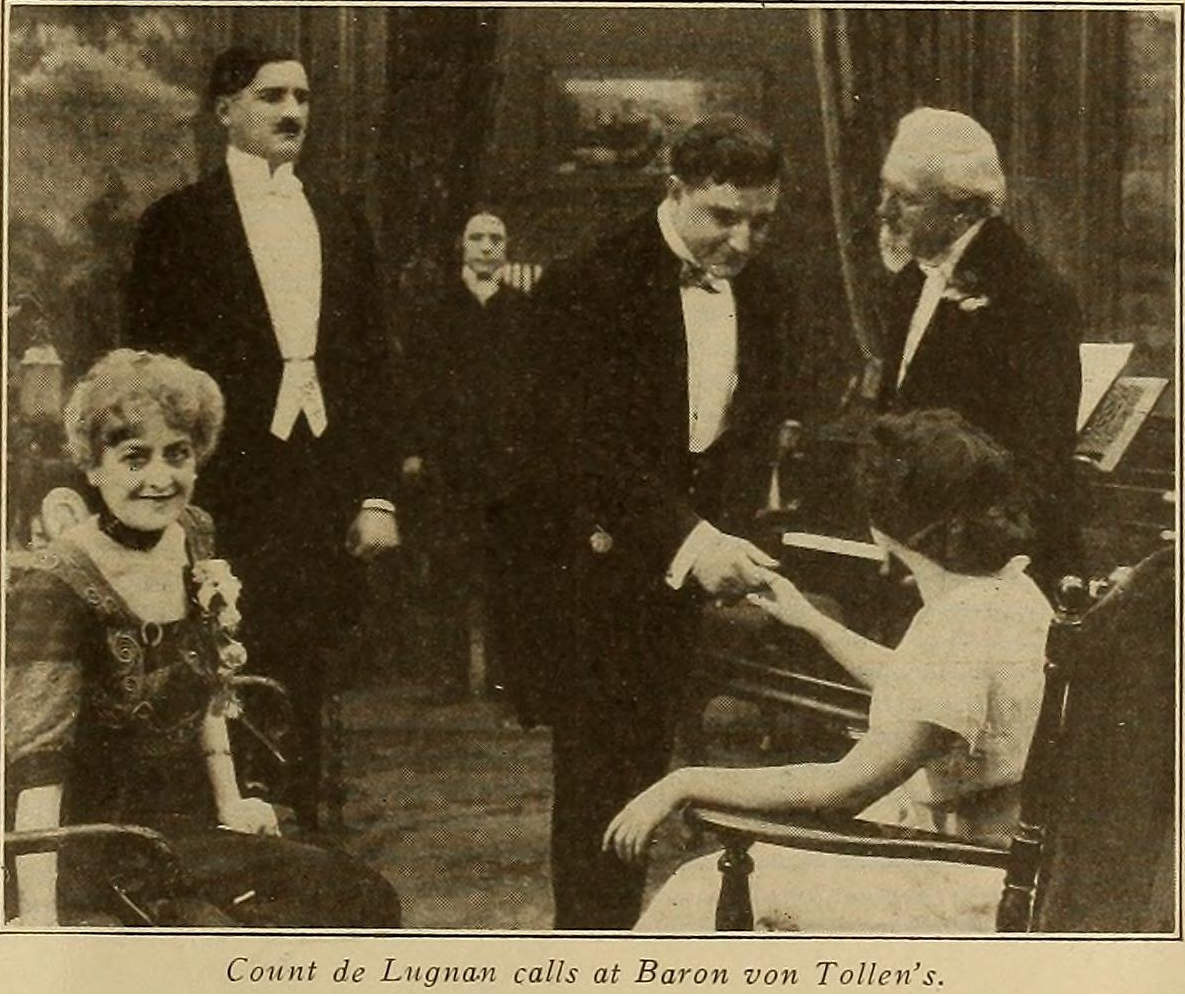
Publicity still with Francis X. Bushman

The Baron pretends to be overjoyed at her return and invites the Count to dinner. The Count falls in love with the daughter and finally asks for her hand. The Baron consents on condition that the Count enter his plot to start a revolution in Leutala and to become king when the country is captured. The Count is willing. They all go to the country, where Captain Tanner, a former military man, has preceded them, to stir up the revolution. Captain Tanner also is in love with Annetta and asks the Baron for her hand. The Baron is enraged and says she is promised to the Count. Tanner then goes to the Count and threatens to expose the plot unless the Count gives up Annetta. The Count draws and they fight a fierce battle in a darkened room. Tanner is worsted and escapes.

The Captain rushes to inform the authorities, but is arrested. He is executed as a revolutionist and the plot is exposed. The Baron's party flee to his private yacht and escape. Annetta confesses her part in the plot to the Count, but tells him that she really has fallen in love with him. He readily forgives her. While the Baron's ambition is blasted, he is reconciled by the fact that the Count and his daughter are really in love."

== Cast ==
- Francis X. Bushman as Count Jean de Lugnan
- Beverly Bayne as Annetta von Tollen
- Thomas Commerford
- Lester Cuneo
- Joseph Byron Totten
- Betty Brown
- Helen Dunbar
- Richard Travers
- Gerda Holmes
- Gloria Swanson (bit part)

== Reception ==
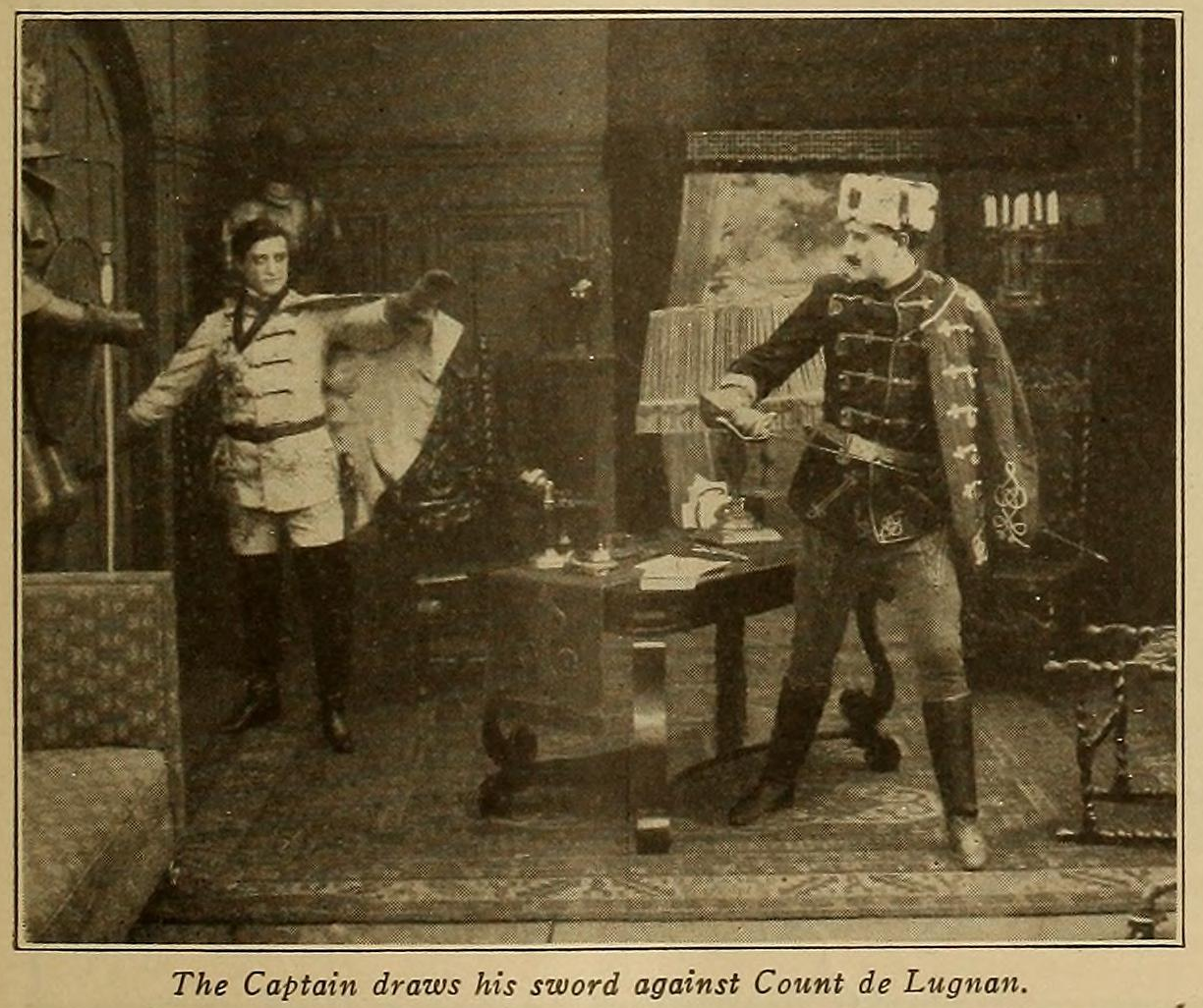
Publicity still with Francis X. Bushman

Motography reviewer Neil G. Caward gave the film a positive review, saying "the story is so constructed as to grip and hold one's attention from start to finish."
