= Her Sturdy Oak =

1921 film

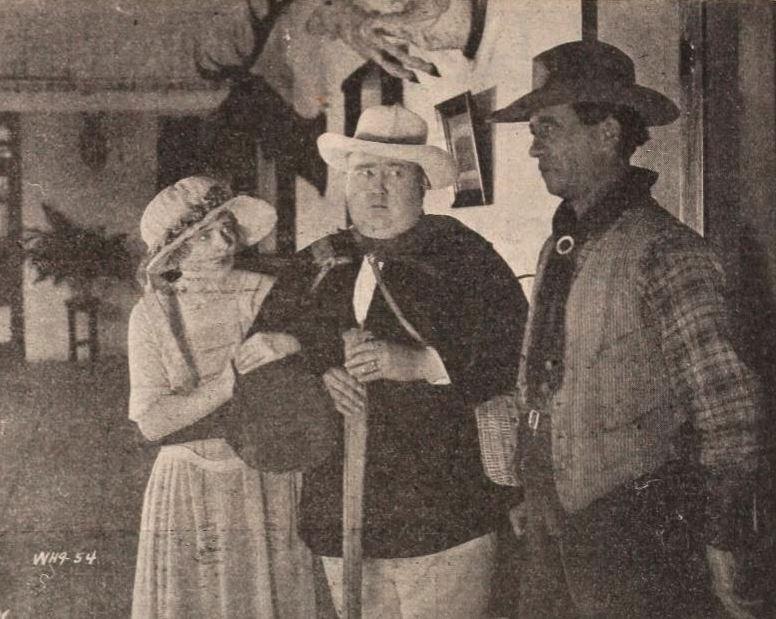
- Directed by: Thomas N. Heffron
- Screenplay by: Elmer Blaney Harris
- Story by: Elmer Blaney Harris
- Starring: Wanda Hawley; Walter Hiers; Sylvia Ashton; Mayme Kelso; Leo White; Fred R. Stanton
- Cinematography: William E. Collins
- Production company: Realart Pictures Corporation
- Distributed by: Realart Pictures Corporation
- Release date: July 14, 1921
- Running time: 50 minutes
- Country: United States
- Language: English

Her Sturdy Oak (also known as The Clinging Vine) is a 1921 black & white silent American comedy film directed by Thomas N. Heffron and written by Elmer Blaney Harris. Released by Realart Pictures Corporation, the film stars Wanda Hawley, Walter Hiers, and Sylvia Ashton, with a supporting cast of Mayme Kelso, Leo White and Fred R. Stanton.

Her Sturdy Oak is considered a "lost silent feature" by the US Library of Congress.

== Cast ==
- Wanda Hawley as Violet White
- Walter Hiers as Samuel Butteers
- Sylvia Ashton as Belle Bright
- Mayme Kelso as Mrs. White
- Leo White as Archibald Mellon
- Fred R. Stanton as Ranch Foreman
