= Man and His Soul =

1916 film by John W. Noble

- Directed by: John W. Noble
- Starring: Francis X. Bushman; Beverly Bayne
- Cinematography: Herbert Oswald Carleton; Marty Malone (asst. camera)
- Production company: Quality Pictures
- Distributed by: Metro Pictures
- Release date: January 31, 1916
- Running time: 5 reels
- Country: United States
- Language: Silent (English intertitles)

Man and His Soul is a 1916 American silent melodrama film produced by Quality Pictures and distributed by Metro Pictures. The film was directed by Metro's resident director John W. Noble and starred Francis X. Bushman and Beverly Bayne. Much of the film was shot in Jacksonville, Florida. The film is now considered a lost film.

== Cast ==
- Francis X. Bushman as John Conscience/John Power
- Beverly Bayne as Mary Knowles
- Edward Brennan as Reverend Edward Knowles
- Charles Prince as Stephen Might Sr. (*as Charles H. Prince)
- John Davidson as Stephen Might Jr.
- Helen Dunbar as Mrs. Conscience, John's mother
- Grace Valentine as Eve
- Etta Mansfield as Unknown role
- Fred Sittenham as Unknown role
- Anita Snell as Little girl

== See also ==
- Francis X. Bushman filmography
