= The Brass Check (film) =

- Directed by: Will S. Davis
- Written by: June Mathis
- Starring: Francis X. Bushman; Beverly Bayne
- Cinematography: Rudolph Bergquist
- Production company: Metro Pictures
- Distributed by: Metro Pictures
- Release date: March 11, 1918
- Running time: 5 reels
- Country: United States
- Language: Silent (English intertitles)

The Brass Check is a lost 1918 American silent comedy-drama film directed by Will S. Davis and starring Francis X. Bushman and Beverly Bayne. Metro Pictures produced and distributed the film.

== Plot ==
As described in a film magazine, ordered out of the family home because he refused to marry the woman selected by this father Silas Trevor (Currier), Richard Trevor (Bushman) finds himself out in the world without funds or a way of earning some. Becoming a detective, he finds a suitcase check and follows this clue to a private insane asylum. There he helps Henry Everett (Joyner) escape. Richard than assists Everett and his sister Edith (Bayne) across the state line, but then returns to line up the men who made Everett their victim. Richard is surprised to find that his own father was at the bottom of the scheme, and that Everett was being held at the asylum because he had discovered a method of manufacturing rubber but refused to sell it. In a clever way Richard has his father pay a high price for Everett's patent, and then introduces Edith as future wife.

== Cast ==
- Francis X. Bushman as Richard Trevor
- Beverly Bayne as Edith Everett
- Augustus Phillips as Wellington Dix
- Frank Currier as Silas Trevor
- Ollie Cooper as Norma Glanor
- Francis Joyner as Henry Everett (credited as Frank Joyner)
- Rudolph De Cordova as Cornelius Everett
- Bob Williamson as Peter Glanor (credited as Robert Williamson)
- Hugh Jeffrey as Blake
- John Smiley as William Roberts
- Hugh d'Arcy as J. Osborne Cole
- Jack Newton as Robert Dexler
- Syn De Conde

== Reception ==
Like many American films of the time, The Brass Check was subject to cuts by city and state film censorship boards. For example, the Chicago Board of Censors required a cut, in Reel 2, of the boy picking up a pocketbook and running to corner with the same, Reel 4, closeup of man taking rings and following view of him placing them in pocket, and the closeup of an open drawer showing money and following scene with burglar placing money in pockets.
