= Red, White and Blue Blood =

Film directed by Charles Brabin

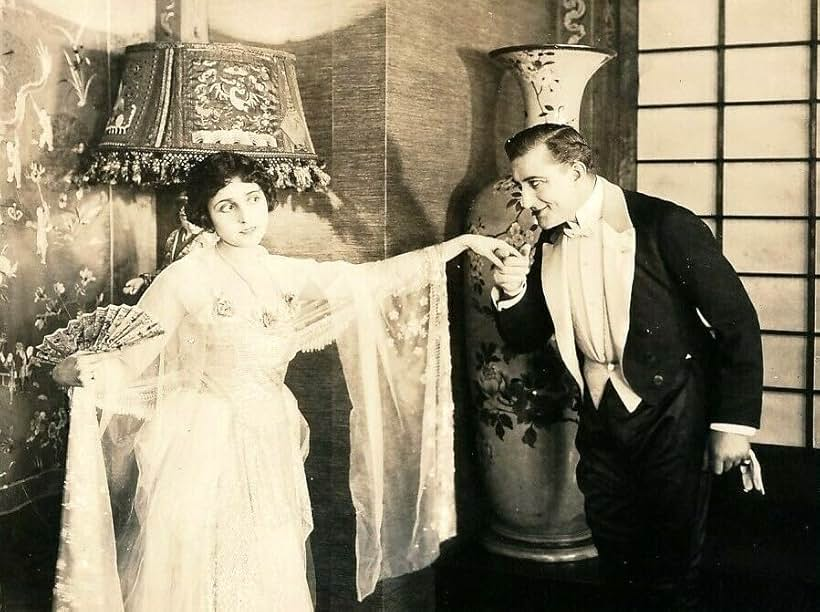
- Directed by: Charles Brabin
- Screenplay by: June Mathis (scenario)
- Story by: Shannon Fife
- Produced by: Maxwell Karger
- Starring: Francis X. Bushman; Beverly Bayne; Adella Barker
- Cinematography: R. J. Bergquist
- Production company: Metro Pictures
- Release date: December 24, 1917 (US)
- Running time: 5 reels
- Country: United States
- Language: Silent (English intertitles)

Red, White and Blue Blood is a lost 1917 American silent comedy film directed by Charles Brabin. It stars Francis X. Bushman, Beverly Bayne, and Adella Barker, and was released on December 24, 1917.

== Cast list ==
- Francis X. Bushman as John Spaulding
- Beverly Bayne as Helen Molloy-Smythe
- Adella Barker as Mrs. Molloy-Smythe
- William H. Tooker as Patrick Spaulding
- Duncan McRae as Count Jules Berratti
- Cecil Fletcher as Bob Molloy-Smythe
- Jack Raymond as Light-fingered Bertie
- C. R. McKinney as Charlie Jadwin
- Arthur Housman
