= Dear Old Girl =

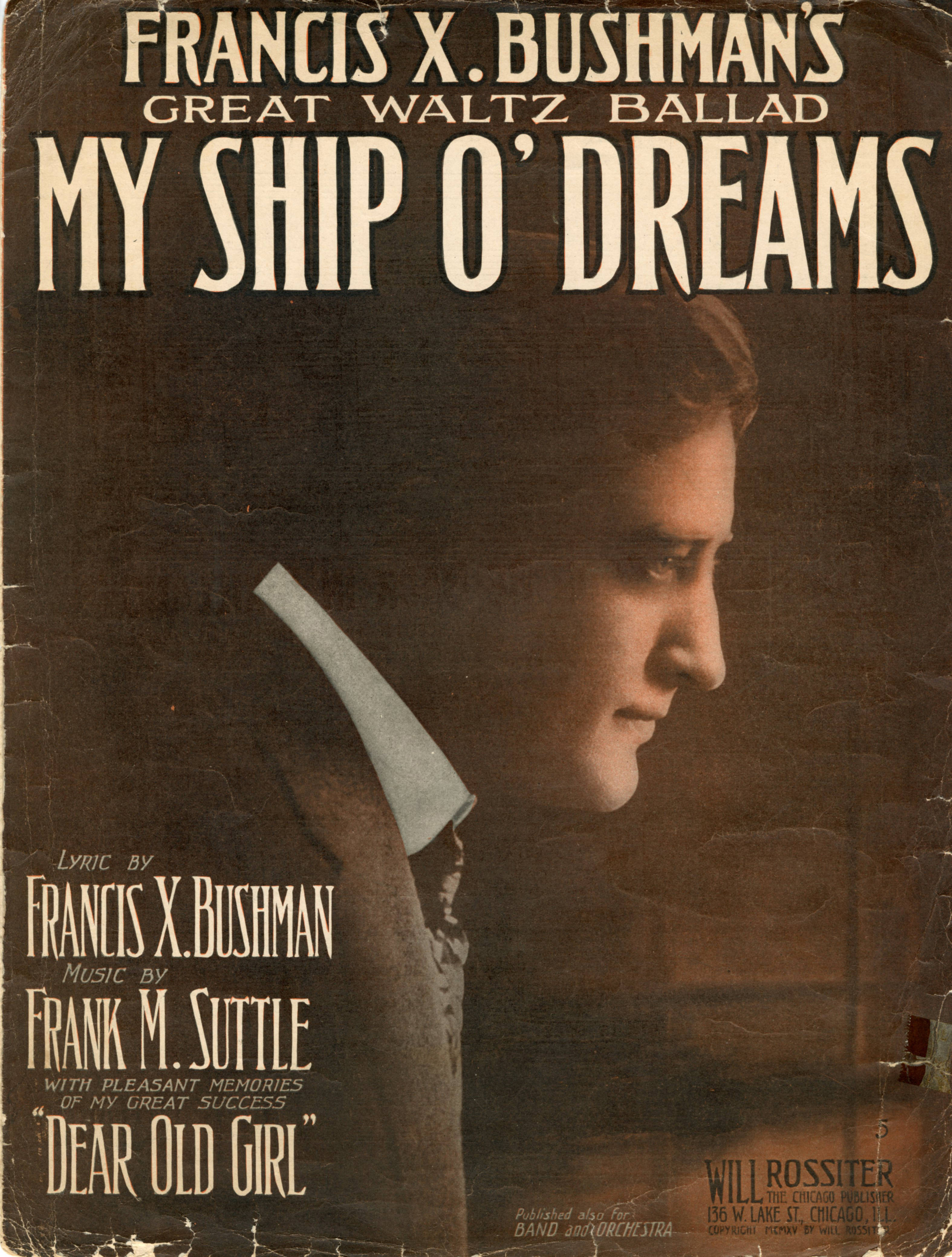
- sheet music played at the film
- Directed by: Theodore Wharton
- Written by: Theodore Wharton
- Produced by: Essanay Studios; Theodore Wharton
- Starring: Francis X. Bushman; Beverly Bayne
- Cinematography: D. T. Hargan
- Distributed by: General Film Company
- Release date: October 10, 1913
- Running time: 20 minutes

Dear Old Girl is a 1913 silent short romance film directed by Theodore Wharton and starring Francis X. Bushman and Beverly Bayne. It was made by the Essanay Company of Chicago.

It is not known whether the film currently survives.

== Cast ==
- Francis X. Bushman - Ted Warren, a Student
- Beverly Bayne - Dora Allen
- William Bailey - Friend of Ted Warren's
- Frank Dayton - John Allen
- Helen Dunbar - Mrs. Allen
- Theodore Tweston - William Warren, Ted's Father
- Robert Walker - Jim - Colored servant
- Eleanor Blanchard -
- William Glasby -

== See also ==
- Francis X. Bushman filmography
