= My Autobiography (Mussolini book) =

1928 autobiography of Benito Mussolini

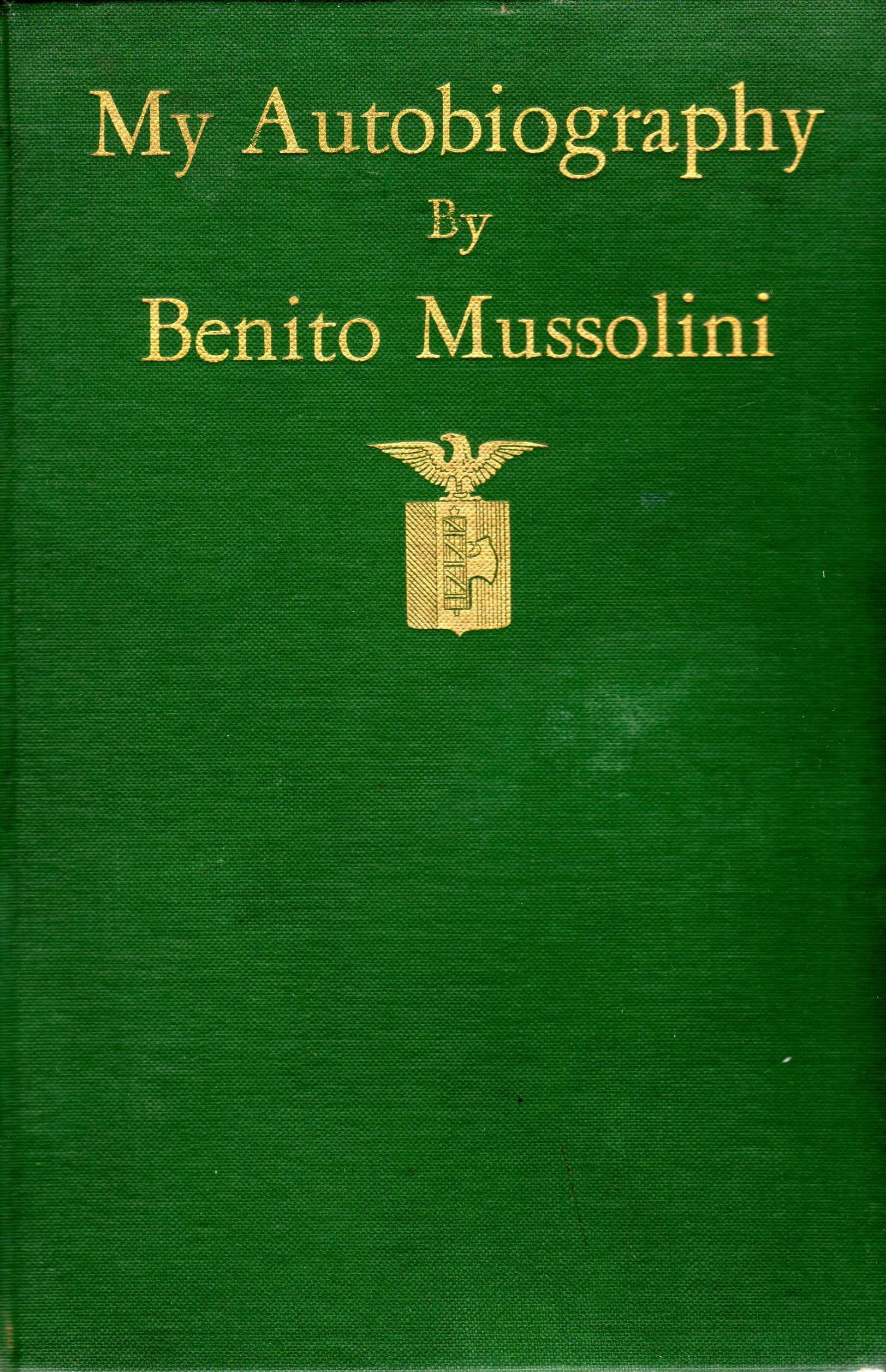
- Cover of the first Scribner edition
- Author: Benito Mussolini
- Language: English
- Subject: Fascism
- Publisher: Charles Scribner's Sons
- Publication date: 1928
- Publication place: United States
- Media type: Print (hardcover)
- Pages: 318
- OCLC: 917663
- LC Class: DG575.M8 A2 1928

My Autobiography is a book by Benito Mussolini. It is a dictated, narrative autobiography recounting the author's youth, his years as an agitator and journalist, his experiences in World War I, the formation and revolutionary struggles of the Fascist Party, the March on Rome, and his early years in power. It was first published in 1928; Richard Washburn Child, together with Luigi Barzini, Jr., served as the book's ghostwriter.

== Background ==
Mussolini dictated parts of the text to his brother Arnaldo Mussolini who handed the manuscripts, together with other material supplied by Mussolini's lover Margherita Sarfatti, to Richard Washburn Child (the former American ambassador to Italy). Child served together with Luigi Barzini, Jr. as a ghostwriter for the autobiography, which was mainly aimed at readers in the U.S. It was a paid work of propaganda and remained unpublished in Italy until 1971. It was first serialized in The Saturday Evening Post (May to Oct. 1928) and then published as a book, with a foreword, by Child. In this preface, he wrote:

In our time it may be shrewdly forecast that no man will exhibit dimensions of permanent greatness equal to those of Mussolini.

— Richard Washburn Child

== Publishing history ==
The autobiography was first published as a book in gilt-lettered green cloth by Charles Scribner's Sons in 1928. The text's typescript is held in the Houghton Library at Harvard University. Hurst & Blackett reprinted a Paternoster Library cheap edition in 1936 (the title page says 11th thousand). A Japanese translation was published in 1937. In 1939, Hutchinson & Co. published an edition with "specially authorized additions by arrangement and approval of Il Duce, bringing it up to the year 1939".

Greenwood Press reprinted the 1928 edition in 1970 (ISBN 0-8371-4294-6). In 1998, Da Capo Press published My Rise and Fall (ISBN 0-306-80864-1) combining My Autobiography with The Fall of Mussolini: His Own Story (1948).

== Contents ==
- Foreword
1. A Sulphurous Land
2. My Father
3. The Book of Life (in some editions the first three chapters are one titled: Youth)
4. War and Its Effect upon a Man
5. Ashes and Embers
6. The Death Struggle of a Worn out Democracy
7. The Garden of Fascism
8. Toward Conquest of Power
9. Thus We Took Rome
10. Five Years of Government
11. New Paths
12. The Fascist State and the Future
13. En Route
- Index
