= The Poor Rich Man =

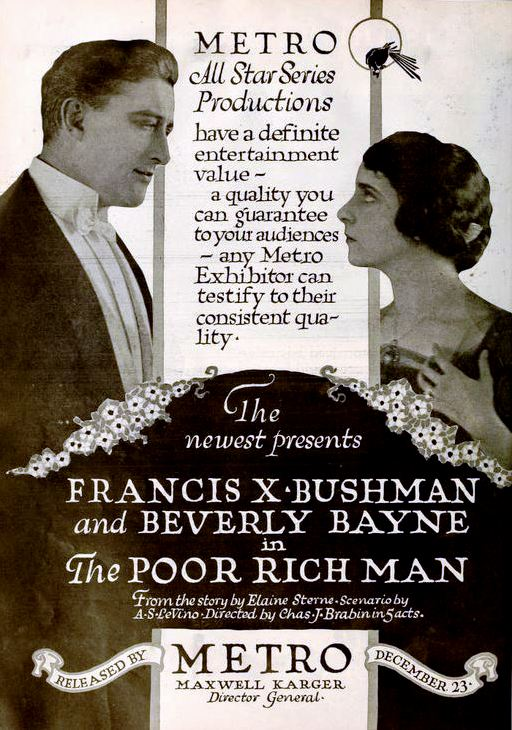
- Advertisement in Moving Picture World
- Directed by: Charles Brabin
- Screenplay by: Albert S. Le Vino
- Story by: Elaine Sterne
- Produced by: Maxwell Karger
- Starring: Francis X. Bushman; Beverly Bayne
- Cinematography: Frank D. Williams
- Production company: Metro Pictures
- Distributed by: Metro Pictures
- Release date: December 23, 1918
- Running time: 5 reels
- Country: United States
- Language: Silent (English intertitles)

The Poor Rich Man is a surviving 1918 American silent costume-romance film, produced and distributed by Metro Pictures. It was directed by Charles Brabin and starred screen lovers Francis X. Bushman and Beverly Bayne.

== Cast ==
- Francis X. Bushman as Vantyne Carter
- Beverly Bayne as Arizona Brown
- Stuart Holmes as Teddy Carter
- Sally Crute as Edith Trentoni
- William Frederic as Pecos Bill Brown
- C.J. Williams as James Carter
- Jules Cowles as Hobo
- Louis Wolheim as Wrestler

== See also ==
- Francis X. Bushman filmography

== Preservation status ==
This film is preserved at the BFI National Film and Television Archive in London, courtesy of MGM.
