= A Virginia Romance =

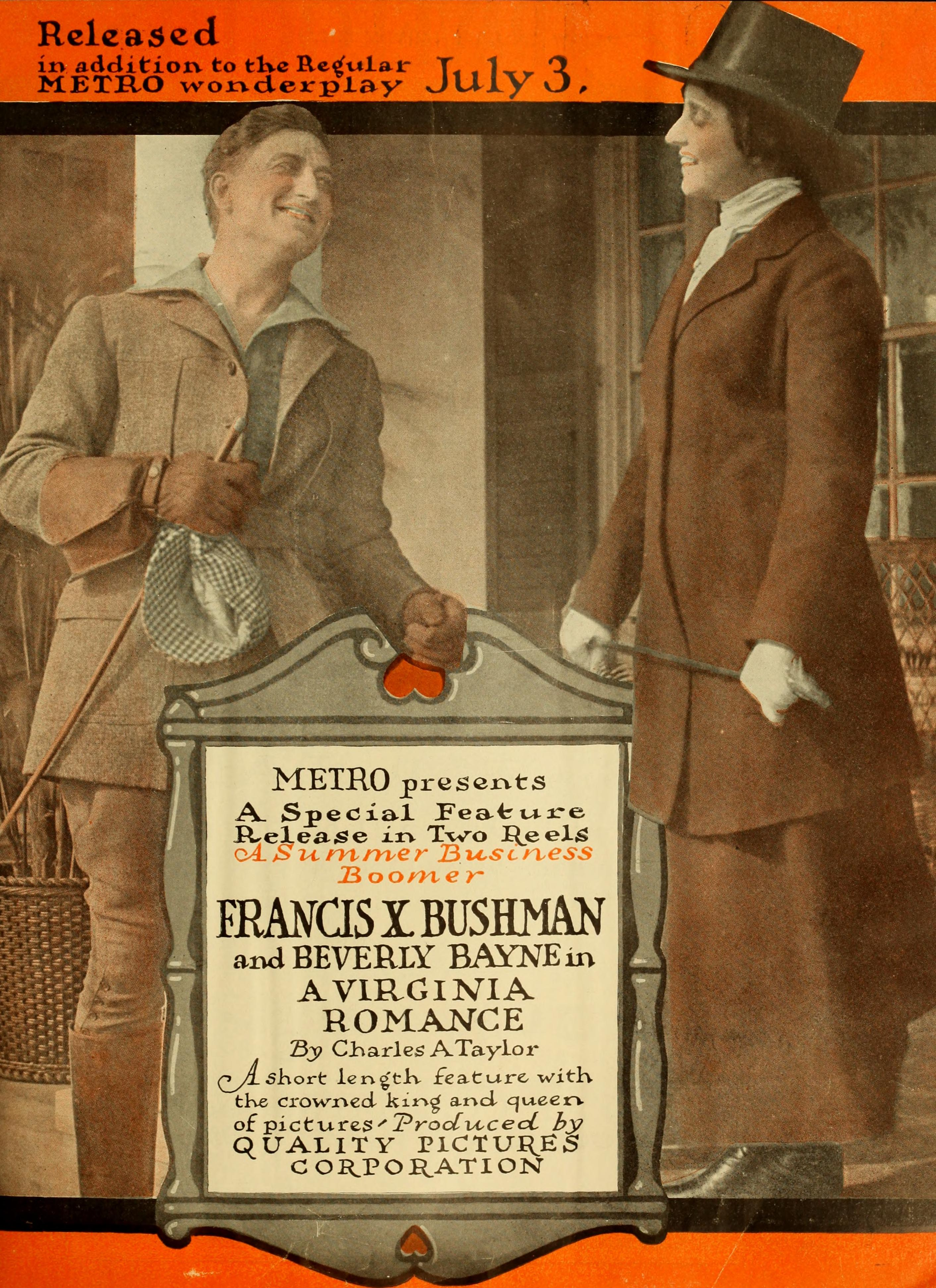
- Directed by: Charles Belmore
- Written by: Charles A. Taylor
- Produced by: Quality Pictures Corporation
- Starring: Francis X. Bushman; Beverly Bayne
- Production company: Metro Pictures
- Distributed by: Metro Pictures
- Release date: July 22, 1916
- Running time: 2 reels
- Country: USA
- Language: Silent..English titles

A Virginia Romance is a 1916 American silent short drama film directed by Charles Belmore and starring Francis X. Bushman and Beverly Bayne. It was produced and distributed by Metro Pictures. Writer Charles A. Taylor was at one time married to Laurette Taylor.

== Cast ==
- Francis X. Bushman - Ralph Everly
- Beverly Bayne - Georgia Daniels
- Lester Cuneo - Harry Daniels
- Helen Dunbar - Mrs. Daniels
