= A Million a Minute =

1916 film by John W. Noble

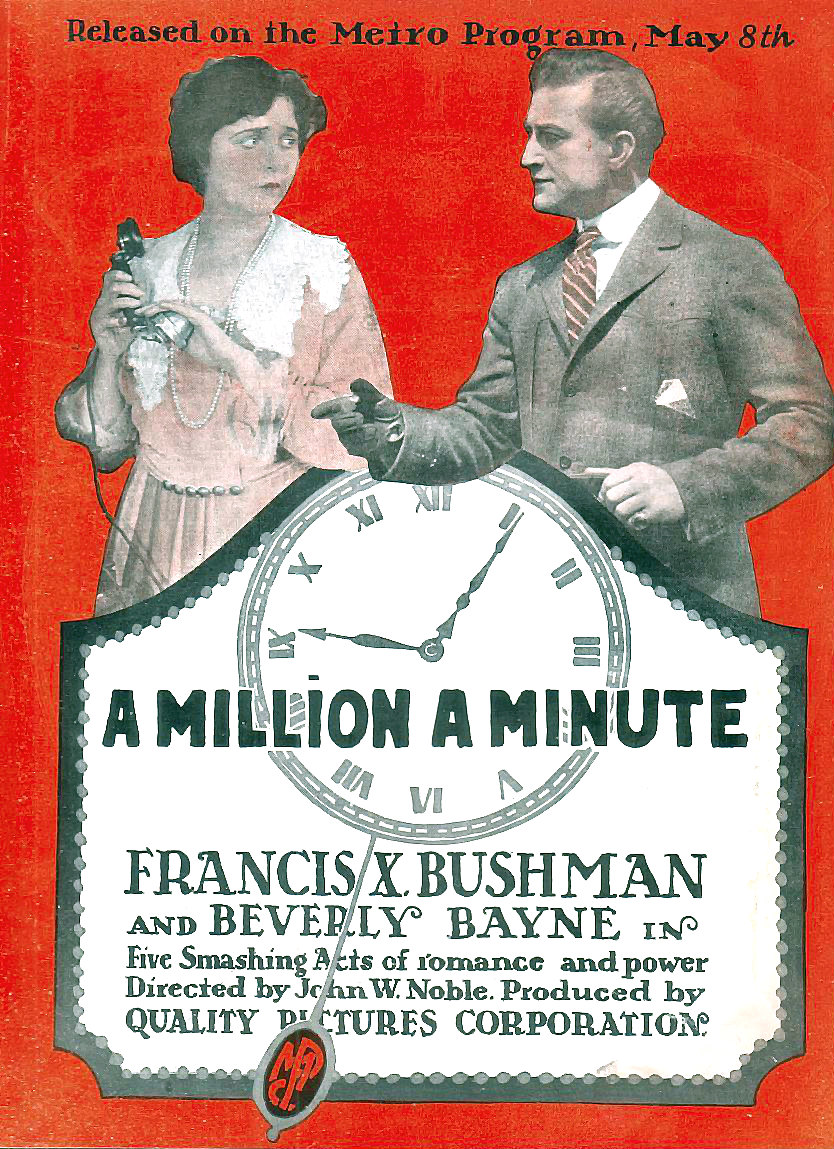
- Directed by: John W. Noble
- Written by: Robert Aitken (novel); Howard Irving Young
- Starring: Francis X. Bushman; Beverly Bayne
- Production company: Quality Pictures
- Distributed by: Metro Pictures
- Release date: May 8, 1916
- Running time: 5 reels
- Country: United States
- Languages: Silent; English intertitles

A Million a Minute is a lost 1916 American silent drama film directed by John W. Noble and starring Francis X. Bushman and Beverly Bayne. The film is based on a novel, A Million a Minute: A Romance of Modern New York and Paris by Robert Aitken. John W. Noble, a regular director for Metro releases, did directing honors.

== Cast ==
- Francis X. Bushman as Stephen Quaintance
- Beverly Bayne as Dagmar Lorraine
- Robert Cummings as Timothy O'Farrell
- William Bailey as Mark Seager
- Helen Dunbar as Fanchette
- John Davidson as Duke de Reves
- Charles Prince as Jules, His Valet
- Mrs. Walker as Mrs Smith
- Carl Brickert as Stephen Quaintance Sr.
- Mary Moore as Ellen Sheridan
- Jerome Wilson as Miles Quaintance

== See also ==
- Francis X. Bushman filmography

== Bibliography ==
- Goble, Alan. The Complete Index to Literary Sources in Film. Walter de Gruyter, 1999.
