= God's Outlaw (1919 film) =

1919 film

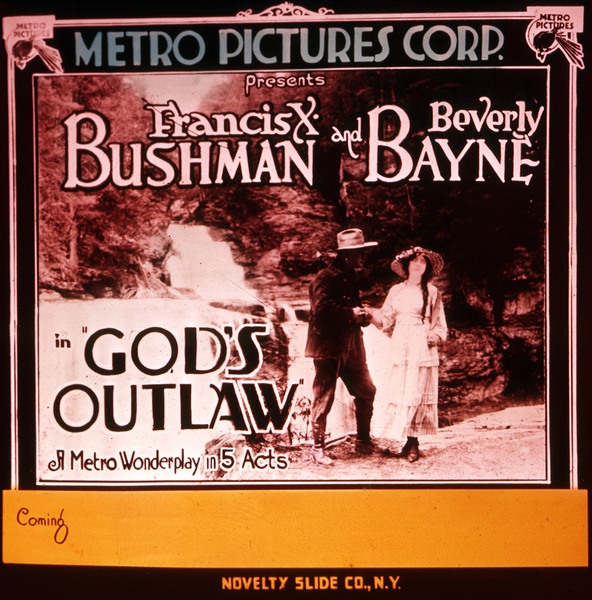
- Directed by: Christy Cabanne
- Written by: Christy Cabanne
- Starring: Francis X. Bushman; Beverly Bayne; Helen Dunbar
- Cinematography: William E. Fildew
- Production company: Metro Pictures
- Release date: July 7, 1919 (US)
- Running time: 5 reels
- Country: United States
- Languages: Silent; English intertitles

God's Outlaw is a lost 1919 American silent Western comedy film directed by Christy Cabanne. It stars Francis X. Bushman, Beverly Bayne, and Helen Dunbar, and was released on July 7, 1919.

== Cast ==
- Francis X. Bushman as Andrew Craig
- Beverly Bayne as Ruth Heatherly
- Helen Dunbar as Mrs. Heatherly
- Samuel Framer as Rufus Sanborn
- Charles Fang as Wu Sing
- Belle Bruce as Edith
- Valentine Mott as Percy Smallwood
- Emily Chichester as Lonesome Lizzie

== Reception ==
Variety's review was very negative, finding that the comedy was deeply unfunny and "The result is that it is about as bunk a piece of hokum as has ever been slipped to exhibitors."
