= The Master Thief (play) =

Play by E. E. Rose

The Master Thief is a mystery play based on a story by Richard Washburn Child, dramatized by playwright E. E. Rose. It has sixteen speaking roles.

Although it was reported in the press that there were plans to film the story, this never came to pass.

== Summary ==
A 1919 news story about a performance states:

”Of course it is a mystery play, the title makes that fact apparent. The play bill further says that ‘you meet eastern men and women, good people and shady people, all involved in an intensely dramatic, engrossing story. Of course there is a love interest all the time in the prologue and the three acts.’”

Another news account states:

”The play is of the mystery type, with its thrills and surprises, and carries a comedy vein all through.”

== Performances ==
Francis X. Bushman and Beverly Bayne, who married in 1918, successfully toured the production for eight months, from at least October 1919 until July 1920, produced by Oliver Morosco. The production then returned to the East Coast for a 38-week run in New York City.

Admission charged at Sacramento, California, probably typical of the era, was 50 cents and one dollar for a matinee, and a dollar and $1.50 for evening performances.

=== Background ===
When the Morosco production played Seattle, the Post-Intelligencer interviewed Beverly Bayne, and reported that the play was apparently suggested by an incident in Child’s then-famous Paymaster stories, in which his anti-hero - a criminal dubbed “the Paymaster” - regularly outwitted his opponents, including the police, and other more dangerous villains. The play was intended as satire on the melodramas popular in the first part of the century.

”The play, as adapted, was a mystery in which Bushman played a shady East India millionaire whose close business associates begin meeting terrible fates (either personal or financial ruin) that seem to be the work of some sinister group. Bayne, of course, played the millionaire’s love interest, who helps him crack the case before he himself becomes a victim.”

The play originally opened in New York City, in the Bronx, and the production was not intended to tour, but an actor’s strike sent the show on the road and extended Bushman’s involvement with Morosco.

A Post-Intelligencer writer, Everhardt Armstrong, stated that the plot ”unloosed every tried and true device for the production of thrills that the playwright, E.E. Rose, could pry out of his memory.” The reviewer continued that, even so, the writer managed to throw in enough new material to keep the story unique. “Whatever might be said of The Master Thief, dullness is not one of its defects. Things happen. Revolvers gleam. Good women and bad juggle with the destinies of desperate men. The deep-eyed villain, careless of the rights and lives of others is thwarted in his sinister purposes by the omniscient hero, who eventually, of course, win [sic] the heart of the pure girl whom the evil genius sought to make his own. They are al [sic] there, our old friends so dear to the hearts of all true lovers of melodrama at its worst, or best. And among them insidiously glides through her serpentine course, a ‘vamp’ of the kind Theda Bara used to delineate so fetchingly.”

The Seattle writer also noted the irony of Bushman and Bayne portraying a particularly orthodox couple in the play, in light of the scandal two years prior when the duo’s affair became public before Bushman had secured a divorce.
