= Beverly Bayne =

American silent film actress (1894–1982)

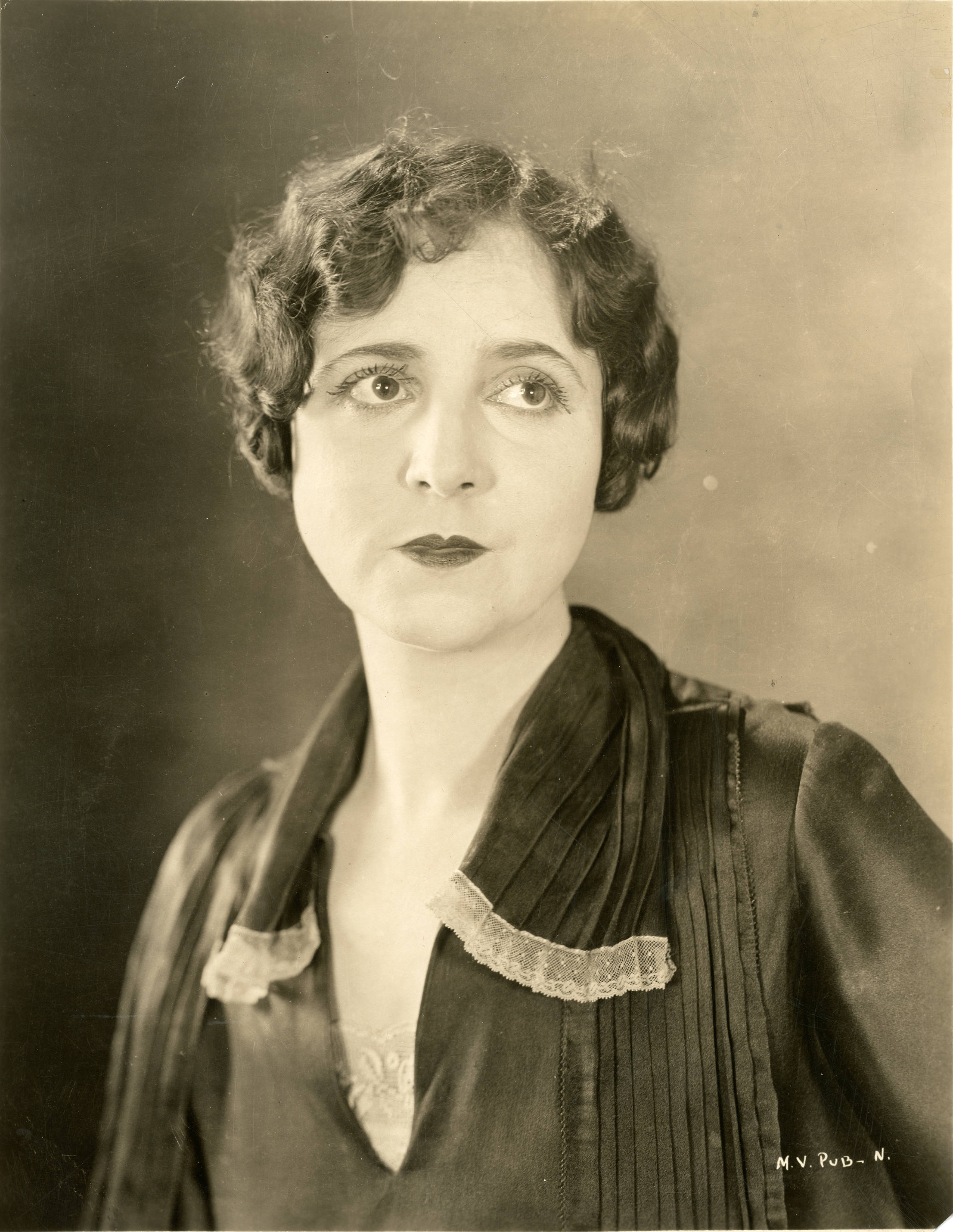
- Bayne in 1924
- Born: Pearl Beverly Bayne or Bain; November 11, 1894; Minneapolis, Minnesota, U.S.
- Died: August 18, 1982 (aged 87); Scottsdale, Arizona, U.S.
- Occupations: Stage, film actress
- Years active: 1912–1951
- Spouses: Francis X. Bushman (m. 1918; div. 1925) Charles T. Hvass (m. 1937; div. 1944)
- Children: 1

Beverly Bayne (born Pearl Beverly Bayne or Bain; November 11, 1894 – August 18, 1982) was an American actress who appeared in silent films beginning in 1910 in Chicago, Illinois, where she worked for Essanay Studios.

== Early life ==
Born in Minneapolis, Minnesota, Bayne moved to Chicago when she was six. She stayed there for a time, and in Philadelphia, Pennsylvania, before she settled in Chicago. She was sixteen when by curiosity she happened by the Essanay Studios. She was told she had a camera face. She began working there at a salary of $35/week. It was soon increased to $75 a week ($2,600 today). In a few years the actress was earning $350 weekly.

== Film career ==
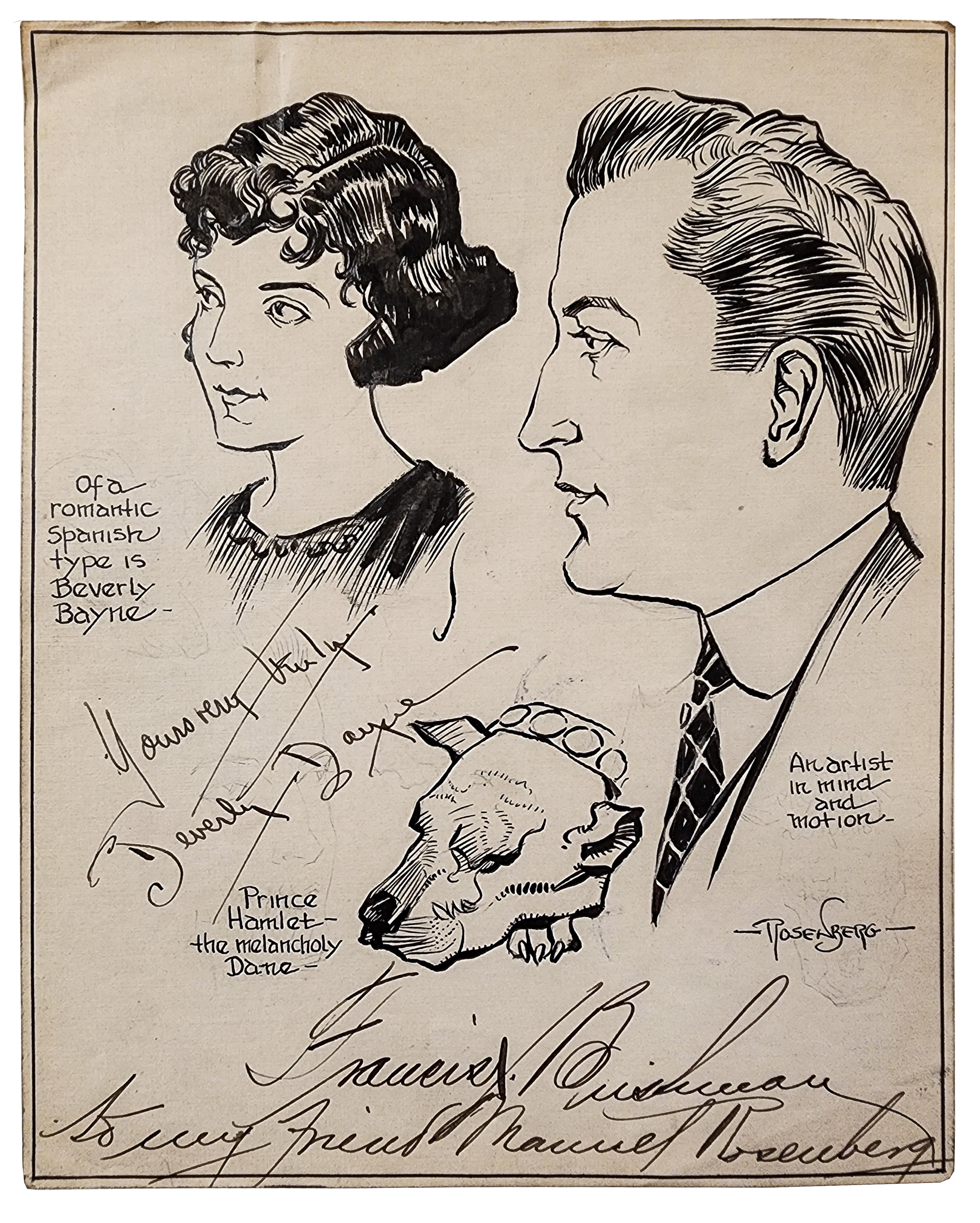
Drawing of Beverly Bayne with Francis X Bushman by Manuel Rosenberg for The Cincinnati Post, 1920

Her first films were The Rivals and The Loan Shark, both in 1912. She played the feminine lead in the latter. Under contract to Essanay at this time was Gloria Swanson. It is said that Swanson wept because her eyes were blue and not brown as were Bayne's. Brown eyes were considered preferable for photography then. Francis X. Bushman. demanded Bayne as his female lead, and soon they were a romantic duo, appearing in 24 films. In 1916 the couple made Romeo and Juliet, which generated a sizeable profit. Bushman and Bayne were married in 1918, only three days after Bushman divorced his wife.

Bayne and Bushman left Essanay and made films for Metro Pictures from 1916 to 1918 and are credited as the first romantic team in film. In 1919–1920 the couple starred in a play, The Master Thief, based on a story by Richard Washburn Child, which did well. Later they appeared in vaudeville and as guest stars in dramatic stock.

In 1924, a silent-film adaptation of The Age of Innocence was released by Warner Brothers; directed by Wesley Ruggles, it starred Bayne as Countess Olenska and Elliott Dexter as Newland Archer. This film is now lost.

Eventually Bayne and Bushman drifted apart. Bayne and Bushman divorced in 1925, and her career went into decline after that. Soon both she and Bushman were out of motion pictures. On reflecting, Bushman believed their demise in films was caused by a new valet who inadvertently snubbed Louis B. Mayer. The movie mogul had called on him during a personal appearance tour. Others contend that the Hollywood establishment disapproved of Bushman divorcing his wife and marrying the much younger Bayne.

Bayne later married Charles T. Hvass, and they lived on a farm in Piscataway, New Jersey.

Her final silent film was Passionate Youth in 1925. Unable to make a comeback, she worked on stage productions and on Broadway throughout the 1930s and 1940s. During the early 1940s, Bayne performed in radio and did an occasional play. During World War II her serious work involved British War Relief.

Her only sound film was The Naked City (1948) with Barry Fitzgerald and Howard Duff, although her name does not appear in the credits. It was her last film.

In 1960, Bayne received a motion pictures star on the Hollywood Walk of Fame at 1752 Vine Street.

== Partial filmography ==
- The Loan Shark (1912)
- Teaching a Liar a Lesson (1912) (Bushman and Bayne)
- A Soul Reclaimed (1912)
- A Brother's Loyalty (1913) (Bushman and Bayne)
- The Rivals (1912) (Bushman and Bayne)
- A Soul Reclaimed (1912)
- A Good Catch (1912)
- The Legacy of Happiness (1912)
- Billy Changes His Mind (1912)
- The Mis-Sent Letter (1912)
- Springing a Surprise (1912)
- White Roses (1912)
- The Butterfly Net (1912) (Bushman and Bayne)
- The Understudy (1912) Bushman and Bayne)
- The New Church Organ (1912)
- The Old Wedding Dress (1912) (Bushman and Bayne)
- An Adamless Eden (1912)
- The Magic Wand (1912) (Bushman and Bayne)
- The Return of Becky (1912)
- The Hermit (1912)
- Back to the Old Farm (1912)
- Billy McGrath's Love Letters (1912)
- Well Matched (1912)
- The Redemption of Slivers (1912)
- The Snare (1912)
- When Soul Meets Soul (1913) *short
- The Hermit of Lonely Gulch (1913) (Bushman and Bayne)
- Dear Old Girl (1913) (Bushman and Bayne)
- One Wonderful Night (1914) (Bushman and Bayne)
- The Ambition of the Baron (1915) (Bushman and Bayne)
- Graustark (1915) (Bushman and Bayne)
- Pennington's Choice (1915) (Bushman and Bayne)
- Man and His Soul (1916) (Bushman and Bayne)
- A Million a Minute (1916) (Bushman and Bayne)
- A Virginia Romance (1916) (Bushman and Bayne)
- Romeo and Juliet (1916) (Bushman and Bayne)
- The Great Secret (1917) (Bushman and Bayne)
- Their Compact (1917) (Bushman and Bayne)
- The Adopted Son (1917) (Bushman and Bayne)
- Red, White and Blue Blood (1917) (Bushman and Bayne)
- The Voice of Conscience (1917) (Bushman and Bayne)
- Under Suspicion (1918) (Bushman and Bayne)
- The Brass Check (1918) (Bushman and Bayne)
- The Poor Rich Man (1918) (Bushman and Bayne)
- Cyclone Higgins, D.D. (1918) (Bushman and Bayne)
- With Neatness and Dispatch (1918) (Bushman and Bayne)
- Social Quicksands (1918) (Bushman and Bayne)
- A Pair of Cupids (1918) (Bushman and Bayne)
- God's Outlaw (1919) (Bushman and Bayne)
- Modern Marriage (1923) (Bushman and Bayne)
- The Age of Innocence (1924)
- The Tenth Woman (1924)
- Her Marriage Vow (1924)
- Who Cares (1925)
- Passionate Youth (1925)
- The Naked City (1948)

== Later years ==
She retired from performing completely in 1950 and settled in Scottsdale, Arizona, where she died from a heart attack in 1982 at the age of 87. She was buried in Scottsdale's Paradise Memorial Gardens.
