= List of baseball films =

This is a list of films about baseball, featuring notable films where baseball plays a central role in the development of the plot.

| Year | Title | Director | Genre | Summary |
|---|---|---|---|---|
| 1898 | The Ball Game | William Heise | Documentary | Short film depicting an 1898 baseball game between Reading and Newark. |
| 1911 | Baseball and Bloomers | | Short | An all-girl baseball team uses two Harvard boys in disguise. |
| 1915 | Right Off the Bat | | Drama | A bio-pic of sorts starring professional baseball player Mike Donlin. |
| 1916 | Casey at the Bat | Lloyd Ingraham | Drama | A lost five-reeler based on Ernest Thayer's poem and starring DeWolf Hopper. |
| 1917 | Somewhere in Georgia | George Ridgwell | Drama | Ty Cobb as a ball-playing bank clerk in a story by Grantland Rice. |
| 1917 | Baseball Madness | Billy Mason | Comedy | A silent film starring Gloria Swanson. |
| 1919 | The Busher | Jerome Storm | Comedy | Small-town ballplayer gets a big head after joining the St. Paul Pink Sox. |
| 1920 | Headin' Home | Lawrence C. Windom | Biographical | A silent film about young Babe Ruth, who stars as himself. |
| 1924 | Life's Greatest Game | Emory Johnson | Drama | Chicago Cubs pitcher Jack Donovan refuses to throw a game. |
| 1924 | The Battling Orioles | Fred Guiol, Ted Wilde | Comedy | A barber enlists the help of his father and his old professional baseball teammates to solve a problem. |
| 1926 | The New Klondike | Lewis Milestone | Comedy | A pitcher and his manager clash over a Florida land purchase. |
| 1927 | Babe Comes Home | Ted Wilde | Comedy | Babe Ruth stars as a baseball player who falls for the laundry woman who cleans his uniform. |
| 1927 | Casey at the Bat | Monte Brice | Comedy | Wallace Beery in slugger's fable based on Ernest Thayer poem. |
| 1927 | Slide, Kelly, Slide | Edward Sedgwick | Comedy | A cocky newcomer thinks he's the New York Yankees' new star. |
| 1927 | The Bush Leaguer | Howard Bretherton | Comedy | An eccentric inventor is also the local team's star pitcher. |
| 1928 | Warming Up | Fred C. Newmeyer | Romance | New player competes with team's star for owner's daughter. |
| 1929 | Fast Company | A. Edward Sutherland | Comedy | Elmer Kane (Jack Oakie) hopes the Yankees and an actress are interested in him. |
| 1930 | Hot Curves | Norman Taurog | Comedy | Pittsburgh pitcher finds romance with manager's daughter. |
| 1930 | They Learned About Women | Jack Conway, Sam Wood | Musical | Two pals play ball by day, perform in vaudeville by night. |
| 1930 | Up the River | John Ford | Comedy | A prison baseball game prompts Spencer Tracy and Humphrey Bogart to break into the pen. |
| 1932 | Fireman, Save My Child | Lloyd Bacon | Comedy | Joe E. Brown as a small-town fireman who is also the town's star ballplayer. |
| 1932 | Slide, Babe, Slide | Benjamin Stoloff | Short | Babe Ruth plays baseball with a group of kids who refuse to believe he is who he says he is. |
| 1932 | Perfect Control | Benjamin Stoloff | Short | A schoolboy dreams that his classmates play a sandlot game with Babe Ruth. |
| 1932 | Over the Fence | Lou Breslaw | Short | Babe Ruth convinces a schoolteacher to allow the class to play baseball instead of having their math lesson. |
| 1932 | Just Pals | Benjamin Stoloff | Short | Babe Ruth umpires a baseball game at an orphanage. |
| 1932 | Fancy Curves | Lou Breslaw | Short | Babe Ruth coaches a women's baseball team, and ends up in drag as one of the players. |
| 1933 | Elmer, the Great | Mervyn LeRoy | Drama | Joe E. Brown as an egotistical Chicago Cubs baseball star. Remake of 1929 film. |
| 1934 | Death on the Diamond | Edward Sedgwick | Mystery | Ballplayer (Robert Young) tries to find who's killing his fellow St. Louis Cardinals. |
| 1935 | Alibi Ike | Ray Enright | Comedy | Joe E. Brown as a pitcher with a million excuses. |
| 1937 | Girls Can Play | Lambert Hillyer | Mystery | A women's softball team owner murders a player (Rita Hayworth) by poisoning her catcher's mitt. |
| 1937 | Home Run on the Keys | Roy Mack | Short | Musicians Zez Confrey and Byron Gay sit with Babe Ruth and write a song about baseball. |
| 1942 | The Pride of the Yankees | Sam Wood | Biographical | The life and career of Lou Gehrig, with Gary Cooper as Gehrig and Babe Ruth as himself. |
| 1942 | It Happened in Flatbush | Ray McCarey | Comedy | Hard-hearted manager (Lloyd Nolan) falls for Brooklyn team's owner. |
| 1943 | Ladies' Day | Leslie Goodwins | Comedy | Sox pitcher Wacky Waters (Eddie Albert) is distracted by a hot Hollywood movie star, Pepita Zorita (Lupe Vélez). |
| 1948 | The Babe Ruth Story | Roy Del Ruth | Biographical | The life and career of Babe Ruth, starring William Bendix. |
| 1949 | It Happens Every Spring | Lloyd Bacon | Comedy | Ray Milland as a scientist whose secret formula turns him into a great pitcher. |
| 1949 | The Stratton Story | Sam Wood | Biographical | The career and fateful accident of pitcher Monty Stratton, starring James Stewart. |
| 1949 | Take Me Out to the Ball Game | Busby Berkeley | Musical | Frank Sinatra and Gene Kelly as singing, dancing ballplayers. |
| 1949 | The Kid from Cleveland | Herbert Kline | Drama | The '48 World Series champion Cleveland Indians come to the aid of a young fan. |
| 1950 | Kill the Umpire | Lloyd Bacon | Comedy | William Bendix as a baseball fan who becomes an umpire. |
| 1950 | The Jackie Robinson Story | Alfred E. Green | Biographical | Baseball pioneer Jackie Robinson as himself, with Ruby Dee as his wife. |
| 1951 | Angels in the Outfield | Clarence Brown | Comedy | A Pittsburgh Pirates manager (Paul Douglas) gets some help from above. |
| 1951 | Rhubarb | Arthur Lubin | Comedy | Ray Milland in a cute tale about a cat who inherits a baseball team. |
| 1952 | The Pride of St. Louis | Harmon Jones | Biographical | Dan Dailey as the colorful pitcher Dizzy Dean. |
| 1952 | The Winning Team | Lewis Seiler | Biographical | Based on pitcher Grover Cleveland Alexander, played by Ronald Reagan. |
| 1953 | The Kid from Left Field | Harmon Jones | Comedy | The son of a peanut vendor (Dan Dailey) becomes the leader of a big-league team. |
| 1953 | Big Leaguer | Robert Aldrich | Drama | Hans Lobert (Edward G. Robinson) runs a training camp for baseball's New York Giants. |
| 1954 | Roogie's Bump | Harold Young | Comedy | A mysterious bump somehow gives a boy a big-league arm. |
| 1956 | "Bang the Drum Slowly" (The United States Steel Hour) | Daniel Petrie | Drama | A pitcher develops a friendship with a catcher who has a terminal disease. Broadcast on The United States Steel Hour. Based on the novel of the same name by Mark Harris. |
| 1956 | The Great American Pastime | Herman Hoffman | Comedy | A man (Tom Ewell) decides to coach a Little League team, then regrets it. |
| 1957 | Fear Strikes Out | Robert Mulligan | Biographical | The life and career of Jimmy Piersall, played by Anthony Perkins. |
| 1958 | Damn Yankees | George Abbott and Stanley Donen | Musical | A man sells his soul to the devil on behalf of the Washington Senators. |
| 1962 | Safe at Home! | Walter Doniger | Comedy | With Mickey Mantle and Roger Maris as themselves. |
| 1973 | Bang the Drum Slowly | John D. Hancock | Drama | Robert De Niro and Michael Moriarty star in Mark Harris's adaptation of his own novel about a pitcher who develops a friendship with a catcher who has a terminal disease. |
| 1974 | It's Good To Be Alive | Michael Landon | Biographical | TV movie about former Brooklyn Dodgers catcher Roy Campanella, whose career was cut short when he lost the use of his legs in an auto accident in January 1958. |
| 1976 | The Bad News Bears | Michael Ritchie | Comedy | Walter Matthau's bad Little League team gets help from a girl pitcher (Tatum O'Neal) and a motorcycle-riding slugger (Jackie Earle Haley). |
| 1976 | The Bingo Long Traveling All-Stars & Motor Kings | John Badham | Comedy | A barnstorming team of Negro leagues players, with James Earl Jones, Billy Dee Williams, Richard Pryor. |
| 1977 | Murder at the World Series | Cy Chermak | Drama | TV film starring Karen Valentine and Janet Leigh. |
| 1977 | The Bad News Bears in Breaking Training | Michael Pressman | Comedy | Sequel to 1976 film, with William Devane as the team's coach. |
| 1978 | One in a Million: The Ron LeFlore Story | William Graham | Biographical | TV film on the life and career of Ron LeFlore, starring LeVar Burton. |
| 1978 | A Love Affair: The Eleanor and Lou Gehrig Story | Fielder Cook | Biographical | TV film on Yankee immortal's marriage and tragedy, featuring Blythe Danner and Edward Herrmann. |
| 1978 | The Bad News Bears Go to Japan | John Berry | Comedy | Second sequel to 1976 film, this time starring Tony Curtis. |
| 1979 | The Kid from Left Field | Adell Aldrich | Comedy | Made-for-TV remake of the 1953 film, starring Gary Coleman. |
| 1979 | Aunt Mary | Peter Werner | Drama | A disabled women sets up a baseball team of street kids to save them from juvenile delinquency. |
| 1979 | Squeeze Play! | Lloyd Kaufman | Comedy | Sexy women form a softball team. |
| 1980 | The Comeback Kid | Peter Levin | Comedy | Former minor leaguer (John Ritter) begins coaching underprivileged kids. |
| 1981 | Don't Look Back: The Story of Leroy 'Satchel' Paige | Richard A. Colla | Biographical | TV film with Louis Gossett Jr. as Satchel Paige. |
| 1981 | Only The Ball Was White | Ken Solarz | Documentary | A tribute to the topflight players of the Negro leagues. |
| 1983 | Blue Skies Again | Richard Michaels | Comedy | Denver Devils' potential second baseman isn't a man, it's a young woman. |
| 1983 | Tiger Town | Alan Shapiro | Comedy | Early Disney Channel film about an aging Detroit Tigers (Roy Scheider). |
| 1984 | The Natural | Barry Levinson | Drama | Robert Redford in a fable about an unlikely, unlucky hero, Roy Hobbs. |
| 1985 | Brewster's Millions | Walter Hill | Comedy | Richard Pryor as a minor-leaguer with a chance to inherit 300 million dollars. |
| 1985 | The Slugger's Wife | Hal Ashby | Romance | An Atlanta Braves player tries to break Roger Maris' record and make a marriage work. |
| 1986 | A Winner Never Quits | Mel Damski | Biographical | A television film on one-armed pro ballplayer Pete Gray, played by Keith Carradine. |
| 1987 | Long Gone | Martin Davidson | Comedy | Early cable television film about a minor-league ballclub starring William Petersen. |
| 1987 | Trading Hearts | Neil Leifer | Comedy | Has-been player (Raúl Juliá) and his romance with a Florida single mom. |
| 1987 | Amazing Grace and Chuck | Mike Newell | Drama | A Montana boy refuses to pitch Little League until the world bans nuclear weapons. With Gregory Peck as President of the United States. |
| 1987 | New York Yankees (The Movie) | Lawrence Miller | Documentary | Interviews and footage covering the then-84 year history of the New York Yankees. |
| 1988 | Bull Durham | Ron Shelton | Rom-Com | Ron Shelton's screwball comedy of a woman's (Susan Sarandon) summer with two minor-leaguers (Kevin Costner and Tim Robbins). |
| 1988 | Eight Men Out | John Sayles | Biographical | Based on the 1919 Black Sox Scandal. |
| 1988 | Stealing Home | Steven Kampmann and William Porter | Drama | Mark Harmon and Jodie Foster in a fictional tale of lost love. |
| 1988 | The Naked Gun: From the Files of Police Squad! | David Zucker | Comedy | Someone's out to kill the Queen of England during a California Angels baseball game, and it's up to bumbling detective Frank Drebin (Leslie Nielsen) to foil the plot. |
| 1989 | Field of Dreams | Phil Alden Robinson | Drama | Voices tell an Iowa farmer (Kevin Costner) to build a baseball stadium in his cornfield. |
| 1989 | Major League | David S. Ward | Comedy | Fictional story of a team of misfit Cleveland Indians. |
| 1989 | Night Game | Peter Masterson | Crime drama | A ballpark murder mystery starring Roy Scheider. |
| 1990 | Mr. Destiny | James Orr | Comedy | A man (James Belushi) blames his misfortune on a long-ago baseball game. |
| 1990 | Taking Care of Business | Arthur Hiller | Comedy | A man (James Belushi) escapes jail to see the Chicago Cubs play in a World Series. |
| 1990 | Pastime | Robin B. Armstrong | Drama | A pair of minor leaguers, one 17, one 40, form a bond. |
| 1990 | The Court-Martial of Jackie Robinson | Larry Peerce | Drama | Andre Braugher in TV biopic of Robinson's court-martial in U.S. Army. |
| 1991 | Talent for the Game | Robert M. Young | Drama | A fictional Los Angeles Angels baseball scout (Edward James Olmos) finds a fantastic young pitcher. |
| 1992 | The Babe | Arthur Hiller | Biographical | Based on the life and career of Babe Ruth, starring John Goodman. |
| 1992 | The Comrades of Summer | Tommy Lee Wallace | Comedy | A television film about a manager (Joe Mantegna) asked to take over a Soviet ballclub. |
| 1992 | A League of Their Own | Penny Marshall | Comedy | A fictionalized account of the All-American Girls Professional Baseball League of the 1940s, starring Geena Davis and Tom Hanks. |
| 1992 | Mr. Baseball | Fred Schepisi | Rom-Com | Tom Selleck as a baseball star who ends up in Japan. |
| 1993 | Rookie of the Year | Daniel Stern | Comedy | A boy develops a magical right arm and becomes a big-league pitcher for the Cubs. |
| 1993 | The Man From Left Field | Burt Reynolds | Comedy | A television film about a homeless man (Burt Reynolds) coaching a Little League team. |
| 1993 | The Sandlot | David Mickey Evans | Comedy | A man reminisces about his childhood friends and the games they played. |
| 1993 | Cooperstown | Charles Haid | Drama | A former pitcher is visited by the ghost of his catcher. |
| 1994 | Baseball | Ken Burns | Documentary | Comprehensive history of the game, 18 hours-plus, as chronicled by Ken Burns. |
| 1994 | Angels in the Outfield | William Dear | Comedy | Disney remake of the 1951 film of the same name. |
| 1994 | Cobb | Ron Shelton | Biographical | The career and last days of Ty Cobb, played by Tommy Lee Jones. |
| 1994 | Little Big League | Andrew Scheinman | Comedy | A child becomes owner of the Minnesota Twins. |
| 1994 | Major League II | David S. Ward | Comedy | Second film in the Major League series about the Cleveland Indians. |
| 1994 | The Scout | Michael Ritchie | Comedy | A New York Yankees scout (Albert Brooks) finds a phenomenal but psychologically troubled prospect. |
| 1995 | Baseball Girls | Lois Siegel | Documentary | A history of women's baseball. |
| 1995 | Hank Aaron: Chasing the Dream | Michael Tollin | Documentary | Aaron's pursuit of Babe Ruth's all-time homer record, directed by Michael Tollin. |
| 1996 | Dorf on the Diamond | Berry Landen | Comedy | Direct-to-video short film in the Dorf series starring Tim Conway. |
| 1996 | Ed | Bill Couturié | Comedy | Matt LeBlanc befriends a baseball-playing chimpanzee. |
| 1996 | The Fan | Tony Scott | Thriller | A deranged San Francisco fan (Robert De Niro) kills a player, kidnaps another's son. |
| 1996 | Soul of the Game | Kevin Rodney Sullivan | Biographical | Story of baseball trailblazers including Jackie Robinson, Satchel Paige, Josh Gibson. |
| 1997 | Joe Torre: Curveballs Along the Way | Sturla Gunnarsson | Biographical | Paul Sorvino as the former New York Yankees manager. |
| 1998 | The Life and Times of Hank Greenberg | Aviva Kempner | Documentary | The life and career of a former Detroit Tigers star and war hero. |
| 1998 | If the Sun Rises in the West | Lee Eun | Drama | South Korean story of an umpire. |
| 1998 | Major League: Back to the Minors | John Warren | Comedy | Third film in the Major League series. |
| 1999 | For Love of the Game | Sam Raimi | Drama | In possibly his last start, a Detroit pitcher (Kevin Costner) goes after a perfect game. |
| 2000 | Perfect Game | Dan Guntzelman | Comedy | Television film starring Ed Asner. |
| 2000 | Angels in the Infield | Robert King | Comedy | Patrick Warburton in second made-for-TV sequel to the 1994 film. |
| 2001 | 61* | Billy Crystal | Drama | HBO film directed by Billy Crystal about the 1961 season of Roger Maris and Mickey Mantle. |
| 2001 | Hardball | Brian Robbins | Drama | Keanu Reeves as a young man who takes charge of an inner-city team. |
| 2001 | Summer Catch | Michael Tollin | Romance | Fictional love story starring Freddie Prinze, Jr.. |
| 2002 | Air Bud: Seventh Inning Fetch | Robert Vince | Comedy | Fourth entry in the Air Bud series. |
| 2002 | The Rookie | John Lee Hancock | Biographical | Based on true story of a high school coach, pitcher Jim Morris, portrayed by Dennis Quaid. |
| 2002 | Bleacher Bums | Saul Rubinek | Comedy | TV version of the 1970s stage play about diehard fans in the outfield bleachers. |
| 2003 | Battlefield Baseball | Yūdai Yamaguchi | Action | Japanese film. |
| 2003 | Day of Independence | Chris Tashima | Drama | Short film about baseball in a Japanese-American internment camp during World War II. |
| 2004 | Hustle | Peter Bogdanovich | Biographical | ESPN dramatization on success and scandal of Pete Rose, starring Tom Sizemore. |
| 2004 | Mickey | Hugh Wilson | Drama | John Grisham story about a Little Leaguer and his father. |
| 2004 | Mr. 3000 | Charles Stone III | Comedy | A potential Hall of Famer (Bernie Mac) is told he's actually three hits shy of 3,000. |
| 2004 | Nine Innings From Ground Zero | | Documentary | How the 2001 World Series helped America cope with 9/11. |
| 2004 | This Old Cub | Jeff Santo | Documentary | Chronicles life of Ron Santo, focusing on his struggle with type 1 diabetes. |
| 2004 | Up for Grabs | Michael Wranovics | Documentary | A battle over who owns ball hit in 2001 by Barry Bonds for his 73rd home run. |
| 2004 | The Winning Season | John Kent Harrison | Drama | A child from 1985 wakes up in 1909 and meets hero Honus Wagner (Matthew Modine). |
| 2004 | Still We Believe: The Boston Red Sox Movie | Paul Doyle Jr. | Documentary | A chronicle of the 2003 Boston Red Sox season. |
| 2005 | Fever Pitch | Peter Farrelly and Bobby Farrelly | Rom-Com | Loosely based on Nick Hornby soccer story, in this case a Boston Red Sox fan (Jimmy Fallon). |
| 2005 | Game 6 | Michael Hoffman | Drama | A playwright (Michael Keaton) has a wild night during a Red Sox playoff series. |
| 2005 | Bad News Bears | Richard Linklater | Comedy | Remake of 1976 film of same name, starring Billy Bob Thornton. |
| 2005 | The Sandlot 2 | David Mickey Evans | Comedy | Direct-to-video sequel to The Sandlot. |
| 2006 | The Benchwarmers | Dennis Dugan | Comedy | David Spade and Rob Schneider as middle-aged nerds who want to play ball. |
| 2006 | Everyone's Hero | Christopher Reeve, Daniel St. Pierre and Colin Brady | Animation | Cartoon family film with baseball theme. |
| 2006 | Beer League | Frank Sebastiano | Comedy | A town drunk plays in a big softball game. |
| 2006 | Off the Black | James Ponsoldt | Drama | An umpire (Nick Nolte) befriends a high school player who hated him. |
| 2006 | Kokoyakyu: High School Baseball | Kenneth Eng | Documentary | Broadcast on the U.S. PBS series POV. Explores the phenomenon of high school baseball in Japan. |
| 2007 | The Final Season | David Mickey Evans | Drama | Based on 1991 season of Norway High School in Norway, Iowa, before it was closed and consolidated into its county school district, starring Sean Astin. |
| 2007 | The Sandlot: Heading Home | William Dear | Comedy | Second direct-to-video sequel to The Sandlot. |
| 2007 | The Bronx Is Burning | Jeremiah Chechik | Biographical | A docudrama of the events surrounding the 1977 New York Yankees season, with John Turturro as Billy Martin. |
| 2007 | Black Irish | Brad Gann | Drama | Boston teen tries to escape family problems through his pitching. |
| 2007 | American Pastime | Desmond Nakano | Drama | Based on true events, depicts life inside internment camps, where baseball was one of the major diversions from the reality of the internees' lives. |
| 2008 | City Without Baseball | Lawrence Ah Mon | Drama | Chinese film. |
| 2008 | Signs of the Time | Don Casper | Documentary | Hour-long film which focuses on the origin of hand signals in baseball. |
| 2008 | Sugar | Anna Boden and Ryan Fleck | Drama | Story about a Dominican prospect and his adjustment to life in the U.S. |
| 2008 | Touching Home | Logan Miller and Noah Miller | Drama | Brothers with pro-ball ambitions deal with their homeless father (Ed Harris). |
| 2009 | The Perfect Game | William Dear | Drama | Based on true story of Mexico team that won 1957 Little League World Series. |
| 2009 | The Open Road | Michael Meredith | Drama | Minor leaguer Justin Timberlake has issues with baseball-legend dad Jeff Bridges. |
| 2009 | Calvin Marshall | Gary Lundgren | Comedy | Talentless baseball player Alex Frost tries to make Steve Zahn coached college team. |
| 2010 | 4192: The Crowning of the Hit King | Terry Lukemire | Documentary | Reviewing the achievements, controversies of all-time hit leader Pete Rose. |
| 2010 | Chasing 3000 | Gregory J. Lanesey | Drama | Two boys go a long way to witness 3,000th career hit of Roberto Clemente. |
| 2010 | Fernando Nation | Cruz Angeles | Documentary | Made for TV as a part of ESPN's 30 for 30 series. Chronicles impact of Fernando Valenzuela's 1981 rookie season with Los Angeles Dodgers. |
| 2010 | Four Days in October | Gary Waksman | Documentary | Made for TV as a part of ESPN's 30 for 30 series. On the Boston Red Sox' comeback from 3–0 series deficit against Yankees in 2004 ALCS. |
| 2010 | How Do You Know | James L. Brooks | Rom-Com | A romantic triangle involving a softball player (Reese Witherspoon) and a Washington Nationals pitcher (Owen Wilson). |
| 2010 | The House of Steinbrenner | Barbara Kopple | Documentary | Made for TV as a part of ESPN's 30 for 30 series. Explores the legacy of George Steinbrenner's ownership of the New York Yankees. |
| 2010 | Jews and Baseball: An American Love Story | Peter Miller | Documentary | Documentary film on the connection and history between American Jews and baseball. |
| 2010 | Jordan Rides the Bus | Ron Shelton | Documentary | Made for TV as a part of ESPN's 30 for 30 series. Explores Michael Jordan's brief career in minor league baseball after his first retirement from basketball. |
| 2010 | Little Big Men | Al Szymanski | Documentary | Made for TV as a part of ESPN's 30 for 30 series. On a Kirkland National Little League team's stunning victory in 1982 Little League World Series, and players' lives in the decades that followed. |
| 2010 | Silly Little Game | Adam Kurland and Lucas Jansen | Documentary | Made for TV as a part of ESPN's 30 for 30 series. About the New York City writers and academics who created Rotisserie fantasy baseball, and how their creation eventually left them behind. |
| 2011 | Catching Hell | Alex Gibney | Documentary | Made for TV as a follow-up to ESPN's 30 for 30 series. Explores relationship between Steve Bartman and other Chicago Cubs fans since foul-ball incident in Game 6 of 2003 NLCS. |
| 2011 | A Mile in His Shoes | William Dear | Drama | A minor-league manager stumbles on a hidden talent who throws apples on a farm. |
| 2011 | Moneyball | Bennett Miller | Drama | Based on a true story, the Michael Lewis best-seller about Oakland A's exec Billy Beane, played by Brad Pitt, and assistant general manager Peter Brand (based on Paul DePodesta, played by Jonah Hill). |
| 2011 | Ballplayer: Pelotero | Jonathan Paley, Ross Finkel and Trevor Martin | Documentary | A behind-the-scenes glimpse into the remarkably organized and well-managed system in the Dominican Republic that has produced an inordinate amount of elite athletes. |
| 2012 | Trouble with the Curve | Robert Lorenz | Drama | Clint Eastwood as a veteran Atlanta Braves scout whose vision is fading. |
| 2012 | Knuckleball! | Ricki Stern and Anne Sundberg | Documentary | A season following pitchers Tim Wakefield and R. A. Dickey. |
| 2012 | You Don't Know Bo | Michael Bonfiglio | Documentary | Made for TV as a part of ESPN's 30 for 30 series about baseball and football star Bo Jackson. |
| 2013 | Home Run | David Boyd | Drama | A ballplayer dealing with substance abuse returns to his hometown. |
| 2013 | 42 | Brian Helgeland | Biographical | Story of Jackie Robinson's (Chadwick Boseman) historic signing with Brooklyn Dodgers under guidance of team executive Branch Rickey (played by Harrison Ford). |
| 2013 | Gibsonburg | Jonathon Kimble and Bob Mahaffey | Drama | Story of the 2005 Gibsonburg High School baseball team, the first Ohio high school team in any sport to win a state championship with a losing record. |
| 2014 | Kano | Umin Boya | Documentary | Based on a true story depicting the multiethnic 1931 Kano baseball team from Japanese-era Taiwan, overcoming extreme odds to represent the island in the Japanese High School Baseball Championship at Koshien Stadium. |
| 2014 | Hero | Manny Edwards | Drama | Christian film about fathers and sons. |
| 2014 | Million Dollar Arm | Craig Gillespie | Drama | A sports agent (Jon Hamm) arranges a baseball tryout for two cricket players from India. |
| 2014 | The Vancouver Asahi | Yuya Ishii | Drama | Set in Canada during the 1930s. |
| 2014 | The Battered Bastards of Baseball | Chapman Way and Maclain Way | Documentary | Look at a Portland minor-league team, featuring Bing (the team's owner) and Kurt Russell (who played for the team and later worked in its front office). |
| 2014 | Henry & Me | Barrett Esposito | Animation | Guardian angel introduces an ill 12-year-old to New York Yankees of different eras. |
| 2015 | The Phenom | Noah Buschel | Drama | A talented young baseball player struggles professionally as he deals with his abusive father. |
| 2016 | Everybody Wants Some!! | Richard Linklater | Comedy | Film by Richard Linklater about immature 1980 college baseball players in Texas. |
| 2016 | Doc & Darryl | Judd Apatow and Michael Bonfiglio | Documentary | Made for TV as a part of ESPN's 30 for 30 series. Explores the lives, careers, and struggles with addiction of former New York Mets stars Dwight "Doc" Gooden and Darryl Strawberry. |
| 2016 | Fastball | Jonathan Hock | Documentary | With Kevin Costner narrating, lead a cast of baseball legends and scientists who explore the magic within the 396 milliseconds it takes a fastball to reach home plate, and decipher who threw the fastest pitch ever. |
| 2016 | Spaceman | Brett Rapkin | Biographical | Josh Duhamel portrays a colorful left-handed pitcher, Bill Lee. |
| 2016 | Undrafted | Joseph Mazzello | Comedy-drama | After a college baseball star doesn't make the Major League Baseball draft, an intramural game with friends becomes hugely important to him as he tries to accept his broken dreams. |
| 2017 | World Beaters | Jonathan Hock | Documentary | ESPN Films production chronicling the Maine–Endwell Little League team that won the 2016 Little League World Series, becoming the smallest community ever to win that event. |
| 2018 | Brampton's Own | Michael Doneger | Drama | A 30-year-old minor league prospect reconnects with his high school sweetheart during the off season. |
| 2018 | Heading Home | Seth Kramer, Daniel A. Miller, and Jeremy Newberger | Documentary | About the underdog Israel national baseball team competing for the first time in the World Baseball Classic. |
| 2019 | Koshien: Japan's Field of Dreams | Ema Ryan Yamazaki | Documentary | US–Japanese coproduction exploring Japanese high school baseball, focusing on two schools trying to reach the 100th Summer Koshien national tournament and the differing approaches of their coaches. |
| 2019 | Bottom of the 9th | Raymond De Felitta | Drama | After serving 17 years in prison for a violent mistake he made in his youth, a once-aspiring baseball player returns to his Bronx neighborhood. |
| 2020 | Baseball Girl | Choi Yoon-tae | Drama | Story of a high school student who tries to join a professional team with the help of her coach. |
| 2020 | Long Gone Summer | AJ Schnack | Documentary | Made for TV as a part of ESPN's 30 for 30 series. A look back at the 1998 home run chase between Mark McGwire and Sammy Sosa. |
| 2021 | Once Upon a Time in Queens | Nick Davis | Documentary | Made for TV as a part of ESPN's 30 for 30 series. A four-part exploration of the 1986 New York Mets and their enduring place in sports culture. |
| 2022 | It Ain't Over | Sean Mullin | Documentary | Explores the life and career of New York Yankees Hall of Fame catcher Yogi Berra. |
| 2022 | Facing Nolan | Bradley Jackson | Documentary | Explores the life and career of Hall of Fame Pitcher Nolan Ryan. |
| 2023 | Tomorrow's Game | Jonathan Coria and Trevor Wilson | Children and family, Science fiction | On the day of his uncle's ascendance into the Baseball Hall of Fame, Daniel is forced to embark on a journey through time that sees him restore his family's legacy and rewrite baseball history. With Paul Rodriguez. |
| 2023 | Shohei Ohtani: Beyond the Dream | Toru Tokikawa | Documentary | Documentary made by ESPN Films exploring Shohei Ohtani's rise from his beginning in Japan to becoming a two-way superstar in Major League Baseball. Starring Pedro Martínez as narrator. |
| 2023 | The Hill | Jeff Celentano | Biographical | The true-life story of Rickey Hill's improbable journey to play Major League Baseball. |
| 2024 | Nos Amours: The Saga of the Montreal Expos | Robbie Hart | Documentary | Canadian film telling the story of the Montreal Expos, including the continuing attempts to return MLB to the city. |
| 2024 | Eephus | Carson Lund | Drama | About the final game of an amateur New England baseball league before their stadium is demolished. |
| 2025 | Who Killed the Montreal Expos? | Jean-François Poisson | Documentary | Canadian film, released in both English and French versions, that details the reasons for the demise and relocation of the Montreal Expos. |
| 2026 | Homecoming: The Tokyo Series | Jason Sterman | Documentary | A documentary from the director who made "The Bear", following a historic series between the Chicago Cubs and the LA Dodgers. |

== List of highest grossing baseball films ==
The following is a list of the highest grossing baseball films of all time.

The Bad News Bears is the most frequent franchise with four entries on the list.

1994 is the most frequent year with five films on the list. 96% of the films were released after 1950; all films had a theatrical run (including re-releases) after 1948. Films that have not played since then do not appear on the chart due to ticket price inflation, population size, and ticket purchasing trends not being considered.

List of highest grossing baseball films
| Rank | Film | Box office | Year | Ref. |
|---|---|---|---|---|
| 1 | A League of Their Own | $132,440,069 | 1992 | |
| 2 | Moneyball | $110,206,216 | 2011 | |
| 3 | Field of Dreams | $84,532,235 | 1989 | |
| 4 | The Rookie | $80,693,537 | 2002 | |
| 5 | The Naked Gun: From the Files of Police Squad! | $78,756,177 | 1988 | |
| 6 | Rookie of the Year | $56,500,758 | 1994 | |
| 7 | Major League II | $53,000,000 | 1994 | |
| 8 | Bull Durham | $50,888,729 | 1988 | |
| 9 | Fever Pitch | $50,605,163 | 2005 | |
| 10 | Angels in the Outfield | $50,236,831 | 1994 | |
| 11 | Major League | $49,797,148 | 1989 | |
| 12 | The Natural | $48,000,000 | 1984 | |
| 13 | For Love of the Game | $46,112,640 | 1999 | |
| 14 | Brewster's Millions | $45,800,000 | 1985 | |
| 15 | Hardball | $44,102,389 | 2001 | |
| 16 | The Fan | $42,000,000 | 1997 | |
| 17 | The Sandlot | $34,348,443 | 1993 | |
| 18 | Bad News Bears | $34,252,847 | 2005 | |
| 19 | The Bad News Bears | $32,211,330 | 1976 | |
| 20 | Mr. 3000 | $21,839,377 | 2004 | |
| 21 | Mr. Baseball | $20,883,046 | 1992 | |
| 22 | Taking Care of Business | $20,005,435 | 1990 | |
| 23 | The Babe | $19,930,973 | 1992 | |
| 24 | Summer Catch | $19,772,447 | 2001 | |
| 25 | The Bad News Bears in Breaking Training | $19,104,350 | 1977 | |
| 26 | Mr. Destiny | $15,379,253 | 1990 | |
| 27 | Little Big League | $12,267,790 | 1994 | |
| 28 | Kano | $11,890,062 | 2014 | |
| 29 | Stealing Home | $7,467,504 | 1988 | |
| 30 | The Bad News Bears Go to Japan | $7,092,495 | 1978 | |
| 31 | Eight Men Out | $5,680,515 | 1988 | |
| 32 | Squeeze Play! | $4,650,000 | 1979 | |
| 33 | The Stratton Story | $4,488,000 | 1949 | |
| 34 | Ed | $4,422,330 | 1996 | |
| 35 | Take Me Out to the Ball Game | $4,344,000 | 1949 | |
| 36 | The Pride of the Yankees | $4,200,000 | 1942 | |
| 37 | Amazing Grace and Chuck | $4,000,000 | 1987 | |
| 38 | Major League: Back to the Minors | $3,600,000 | 1998 | |
| 39 | The Scout | $2,694,234 | 1994 | |
| 40 | Damn Yankees | $2,600,000 | 1958 | |
| 41 | The Babe Ruth Story | $2,400,000 | 1948 | |
| 42 | The Slugger's Wife | $1,878,561 | 1985 | |
| 43 | It Happens Every Spring | $1,850,000 | 1949 | |
| 44 | The Pride of St. Louis | $1,700,000 | 1952 | |
| 45 | The Winning Team | $1,700,000 | 1952 | |
| 46 | Angels in the Outfield | $1,665,000 | 1951 | |
| 47 | Rhubarb | $1,450,000 | 1951 | |
| 48 | Cobb | $1,007,583 | 1994 | |

== See also ==
- List of sports films
- List of highest-grossing sports films
