= George Moriarty =

American baseball player, manager, and umpire (1884–1964)

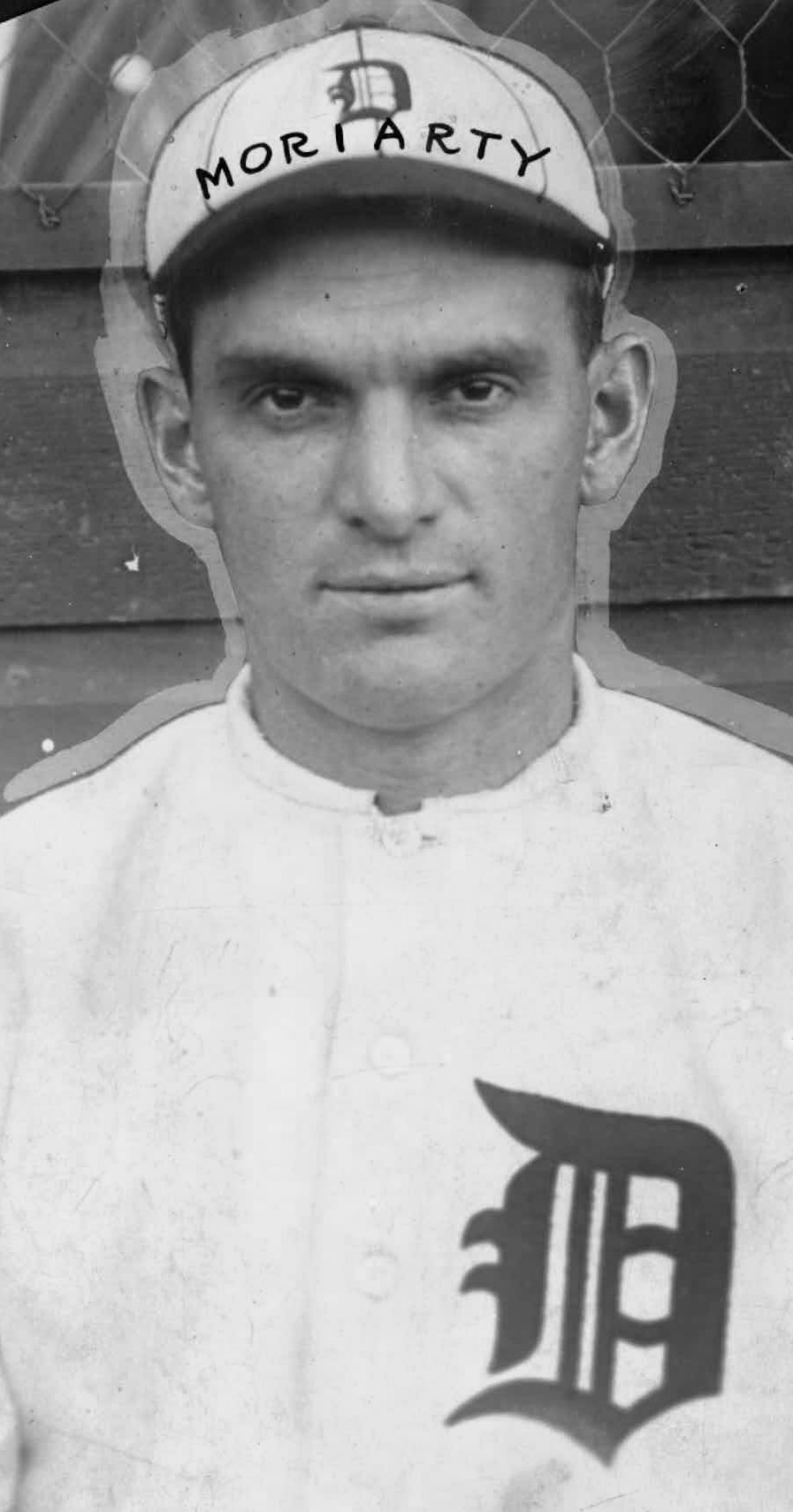
- Moriarty in 1909
- Third baseman / Umpire / Manager
- Born: July 7, 1884; Chicago, Illinois, U.S.
- Died: April 8, 1964 (aged 79); Miami, Florida, U.S.
- Batted: Right Threw: Right

MLB debut
- September 27, 1903, for the Chicago Cubs

Last MLB appearance
- May 4, 1916, for the Chicago White Sox

MLB statistics
- Batting average: .251
- Home runs: 5
- Runs batted in: 376
- Stolen bases: 248
- Managerial Record: 150–157
- Winning percentage: .489
- Stats at Baseball Reference

Teams
- As player: Chicago Cubs (1903–1904); New York Highlanders (1906–1908); Detroit Tigers (1909–1915); Chicago White Sox (1916); As manager: Detroit Tigers (1927–1928)

George Joseph Moriarty (July 7, 1884 – April 8, 1964) was an American third baseman, umpire and manager in Major League Baseball (MLB) from 1903 to 1940. He played for the Chicago Cubs, New York Highlanders, Detroit Tigers, and Chicago White Sox from 1903 to 1916.

== Life ==
Moriarty was born in Chicago, where he grew up near the Union Stock Yards. He made his major league debut on September 7, 1903, at the age of 19 with the Cubs. He was an average hitter but an outstanding baserunner, with 20 or more stolen bases in eight consecutive seasons and 248 career stolen bases, including eleven steals of home. He played his last major league game on May 4, 1916, with the White Sox.

Afterward, he became an American League umpire from 1917 to 1940, interrupted only by a two-year stint as manager of the Tigers in 1927–28. He was one of the AL's most highly regarded umpires in his era, working in the 1921, 1925, 1930, 1933 and 1935 World Series (as crew chief in 1930 and 1935), as well as the second All-Star Game in 1934.

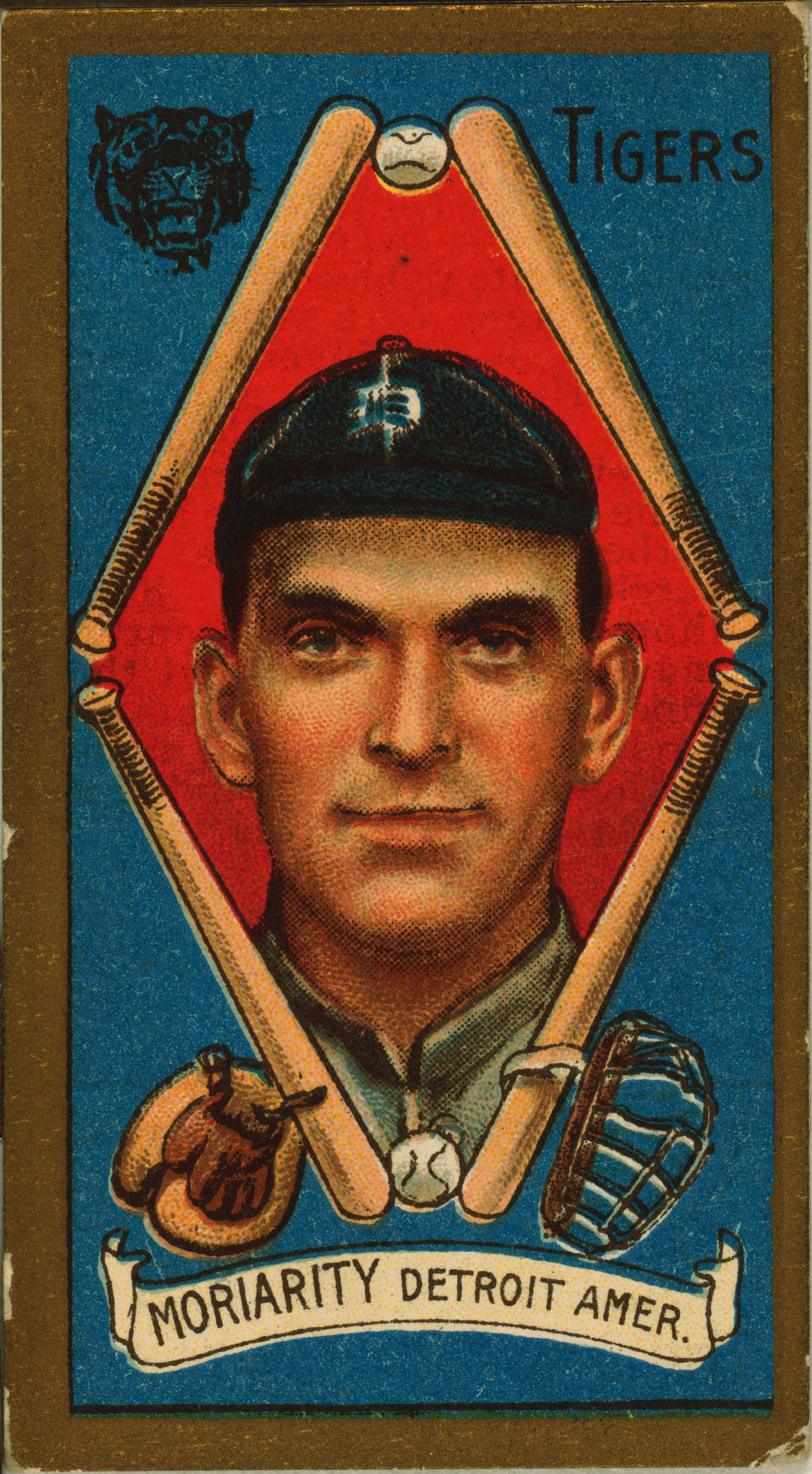
A baseball card of Moriarty as a member of the Detroit Tigers in 1911

On Memorial Day in 1932, Moriarty worked behind the plate for a Cleveland Indians home game against the White Sox. When several Chicago players took exception to his calls, he challenged them to settle the dispute under the stands of League Park after the game. Pitcher Milt Gaston took him on first but Moriarty knocked him flat, breaking his hand. Several White Sox, including manager Lew Fonseca and catcher and future AL umpire Charlie Berry, took him on in turn. The next day, AL president Will Harridge issued numerous fines and a 10-day suspension for Gaston.

Moriarty's baseball cards misspelled his name as "Moriarity".

Moriarty also was noted for coming to the defense of Tiger slugger Hank Greenberg in the 1935 World Series (eventually won by Detroit), when he warned several Chicago Cubs to stop yelling antisemitic slurs at Greenberg. When they defied him and kept up the abuse, he took the unusual step of clearing the entire Chicago bench—a move that got him fined by longtime Commissioner/Judge Kenesaw Mountain Landis. Three years later, when Greenberg was pursuing Babe Ruth's single-season home run record, Moriarty kept the final game of the 1938 season going until darkness made it impossible to continue, Greenberg finishing with 58 homers, two shy of Ruth's record.

In his biography, Greenberg recalled:

Much later in my career George Moriarty and I became very good friends. Back in the early 1900s he played third base for Detroit, and he used to steal home. Somebody wrote a poem about him, and the title was "Never Die on Third Moriarty." All through the rest of his life George felt he knew something about stealing home. When he was umpiring on third base, and on occasion when I'd get on third, he coached me on how to take a lead so I could steal home. I never had the guts enough to try, because I didn't think I could make it. I'd run down the line, and he'd keep insisting that I take a bigger lead. I was always afraid that I was going to get picked off. But it was interesting to see Moriarty, who was umpiring at third base, coaching me on how to steal home for the Tigers. It became a joke among the players, but I never got up the nerve to try it.

Despite his combative field persona Moriarty was quite congenial off the field, maintaining close friendships with Jesuit priests at the College of the Holy Cross in central Massachusetts. He also was a lyricist, supplying the words for Richard A. Whiting's tune "Love Me Like the Ivy Loves the Old Oak Tree", and J. R. Shannon on "Maybe I'll Forget You Then" and "Ragtime 'Rastus Brown" in 1912.

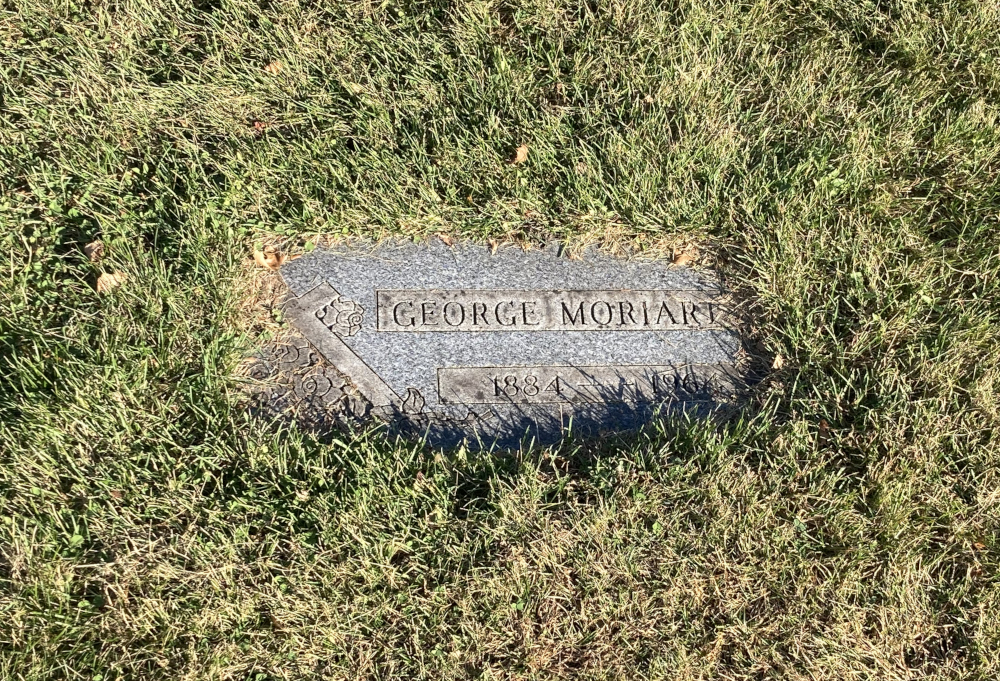
Moriarty's grave at Saint Mary Catholic Cemetery

Moriarty joined the AL public relations staff after retiring from field work, and later became a scout for the Tigers, helping to discover such players as future American league Rookie of the Year and one-time batting champion Harvey Kuenn, and southpaw Billy Hoeft, before retiring in December 1958.

He died in Miami on April 8, 1964, at age 79, and was buried at Saint Mary Catholic Cemetery in Evergreen Park, Illinois.

Moriarty was the grandfather of actor and former Law & Order star Michael Moriarty, who also played pitcher Henry Wiggen in the 1973 baseball movie Bang the Drum Slowly.

== Managerial Record ==
| Team | Year | Regular season | | | | | Postseason | | | |
| Team | Year | Games | Won | Lost | Win % | Finish | Won | Lost | Win % | Result |
|---|---|---|---|---|---|---|---|---|---|---|
| DET | 1927 | 153 | 82 | 71 | .536 | 4th in AL | – | – | – | |
| DET | 1928 | 154 | 68 | 86 | .442 | 6th in AL | – | – | – | |
| Total | | 307 | 150 | 157 | .489 | | 0 | 0 | – | |

== See also ==
- List of Major League Baseball career stolen bases leaders
- List of Major League Baseball umpires (disambiguation)
- 1909 Detroit Tigers season
