= Bang the Drum Slowly (The United States Steel Hour) =

- The United States Steel Hour episode
- Paul Newman in the closing scene
- Episode no.: Season 4 Episode 2
- Directed by: Daniel Petrie
- Written by: Arnold Schulman (adaptation), Mark Harris (novel)
- Original air date: September 26, 1956

Guest appearances
- Paul Newman as Henry Wiggen; Albert Salmi as Bruce Pearson; George Peppard as Piney Woods

Episode chronology
← Previous "We Must Kill Toni"	Next → "Sauce for the Goose"

"Bang the Drum Slowly" was an American television play that was broadcast live by CBS on September 26, 1956, as part of the television series The United States Steel Hour. The play, about the friendship between two baseball players, starred Paul Newman. It was based on the 1956 novel Bang the Drum Slowly by Mark Harris.

== Plot ==
The play begins with narration by Henry Wiggen on a dark set telling the audience that he wrote the play based on a book he also wrote. Wiggen is a pitcher for the fictional New York Mammoths; he was voted Most Valuable Player in 1952. He explains that the play is about his roommate, Bruce Pearson, who is the team's third-string catcher. In their shared hotel room, Pearson, a country boy, irritates Wiggen by talking about how the wind affects the path of his spit as it drops from the window. Pearson complains about taxes. In the locker room, players ridicule Pearson. The team's manager, Dutch, chastises Pearson for calling the wrong pitch and tells him he has no brains.

Eight months later, Wiggen gets a call from Pearson who says he is in the hospital in Rochester, Minnesota. He asks Wiggen to visit him. Wiggen visits the hospital, and Pearson reveals that he has a disease that's "kinda fatal." According to the doctors, Pearson has six months or a year "or maybe tomorrow." Wiggen and Pearson agree that nobody else can know, or else Dutch will get rid of Pearson.

Spring training arrives, and Wiggen is holding out due to a contract dispute. A new catcher, Piney Woods, is competing for Pearson's spot on the roster. Wiggen meets with the team's management. He agrees to sign but insists that he's tied together in a package with Pearson. Four months pass, and Pearson's condition is deteriorating. He struggles to make it look like everything is fine. Wiggen tries to persuade a teammate to stop giving Pearson a hard time and reveals that Pearson is dying. Word of Pearson's illness reaches the manager, and Dutch tells Wiggen that Pearson is through.

The players hold a surprise party for Pearson, even though it's not Pearson's birthday. Piney Woods shows up at the party and says the team sent for him. Wiggen learns that his wife has had a baby and shares the news with the party-goers. Six beautiful women (in real life, Miss America contestants for 1956) show up; they are a present for Pearson from his teammates. Dutch enters the party. He tells Wiggen that he has had a change of heart and agrees Pearson can stay with the team. Pearson is choked up by the kindness of his teammates. He is not feeling well and asks Wiggen to call the doctor.

In the closing narration, Wiggen stands in the spotlight on a dark set and says they took Pearson to the hospital. After the season, he died. Wiggen was a pallbearer. The team did not send a representative. Breaking down in tears, and in the play's final line, Wiggen says, "From here on in, I rag nobody."

== Cast ==
The following actors appeared in the production:

- Paul Newman as Henry Wiggen
- Albert Salmi as Bruce Pearson
- Rudy Bond as Dutch (the manager)
- George Peppard as Piney Woods
- Georgann Johnson as Holly
- John McGovern as Mr. Moors
- Bert Remsen as Horse
- Clu Gulager as Danny

== Production ==
On September 26, 1956, the production was broadcast live on CBS as part of the United States Steel Hour. It was produced by the Theater Guild and was based on the 1956 novel, Bang the Drum Slowly by Mark Harris. Arthur Schulman adapted the novel for television, and Daniel Petrie was the director.

Because of the difficulty in conveying the full story in a one-hour format, the production used a narrative technique in which Paul Newman stepped in and out of the narrative to explain things to the audience. Newman's dual role was compared to that of "the player's friend and the play's Greek chorus."

The story was remade into a 1973 film starring Robert De Niro and Michael Moriarty.

The original 1956 version was not shown again for 25 years. In 1982, the kinescope was replayed on public television as part of a series called The Golden Age of Television. The 1982 broadcast was accompanied by interviews of Albert Salmi, Rudy Bond, George Peppard, director Daniel Petrie, and writer Arnold Schulman.

The Criterion Collection selected the 1956 production as one of eight teleplays in its DVD collection titled, The Golden Age of Television.

== Reception ==
In The New York Times, Jack Gould wrote that production failed to fully convey the story to the television screen. He criticized the "extremely contrived staging" and "wretchedly drawn characterizations." He did find that Albert Salmi had some "effective moments."

Critic Grem Ocotpada praised Salmi's "sensitive performance as the dumb and dying baseball catcher." While not completely satisfied with Newman's performance, he found Newman's closing speech to be moving.

Upon its 1982 revival, the production received more positive reviews. Michael Hill of The Baltimore Sun called it "daring television of rare quality" with a "powerful and touching" story; he also praised the narrative technique of having Paul Newman step in and out of the production to provide explanations to move the story along, saying it bordered on "experimental drama."

John J. O'Connor of The New York Times praised the closing line in which Paul Newman, tears in his eyes, says, "From here on in, I rag nobody". At that point wrote O'Connor: "The audience can have no doubt that something special just passed in the night."
