= Eyes of the Navy =

1940 film

- Written by: Herman Hoffman
- Starring: Charles Middleton; Russell Wade
- Narrated by: Frank Whitbeck
- Edited by: Roy Brickner
- Music by: Daniele Amfitheatrof
- Distributed by: Metro-Goldwyn-Mayer
- Release date: October 26, 1940
- Running time: 20 minutes
- Country: United States
- Language: English

Eyes of the Navy is a 1940 American short documentary film. It was nominated for an Academy Award at the 13th Academy Awards for Best Short Subject (Two-Reel).

Although not filmed by MGM, it was distributed to theatres as part of the Crime Does Not Pay series.

== Cast ==
- Charles Middleton as Farmer (uncredited)
- Russell Wade as Young Man in Automobile (uncredited)
- James Conaty as Officer at Briefing (uncredited)
- Warren McCollum as John Smith, Farmer's Son (uncredited)
