= Tony Roberts (actor) =

American actor (1939–2025)

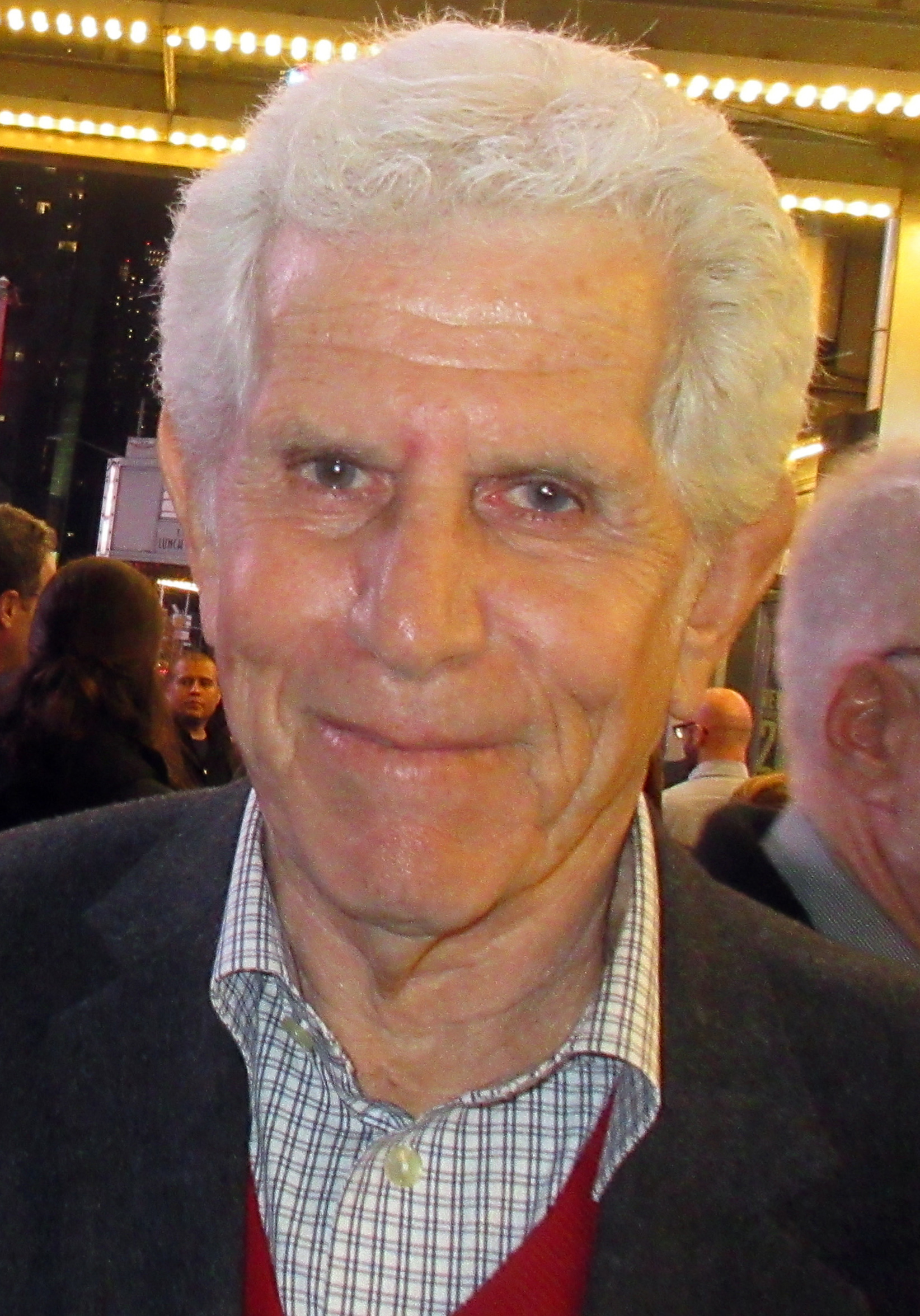
- Roberts in 2019
- Born: David Anthony Roberts; October 22, 1939; Manhattan, New York City, U.S.
- Died: February 7, 2025 (aged 85); Manhattan, New York City, U.S.
- Education: Northwestern University
- Occupation: Actor
- Years active: 1962–2017
- Spouse: Jennifer Lyons (m. 1969; div. 1975)
- Children: 1

David Anthony Roberts (October 22, 1939 – February 7, 2025) was an American actor known for his roles on stage and screen. He is best known for his collaborations with filmmaker Woody Allen, having acted in six of his films, most notably Annie Hall (1977).

Roberts also acted in films by Sidney Lumet, Blake Edwards, and Herbert Ross. On stage, he made his Broadway debut in the Ernest Kinoy play Something About a Soldier (1962). He received two Tony Award nominations for his supporting roles in the musical comedy How Now, Dow Jones (1968) and Woody Allen's comedic play Play It Again, Sam (1969).

== Early life and education ==
Roberts was born in Manhattan, New York City, the son of radio announcer Ken Roberts and Norma (née Finkelstein), an animator who worked at Fleischer Studios during its earlier days. His family was Jewish. Roberts attended the High School of Music & Art and Northwestern University, and he made his Broadway debut in 1962 with a role in the play Something About a Soldier.

== Career ==
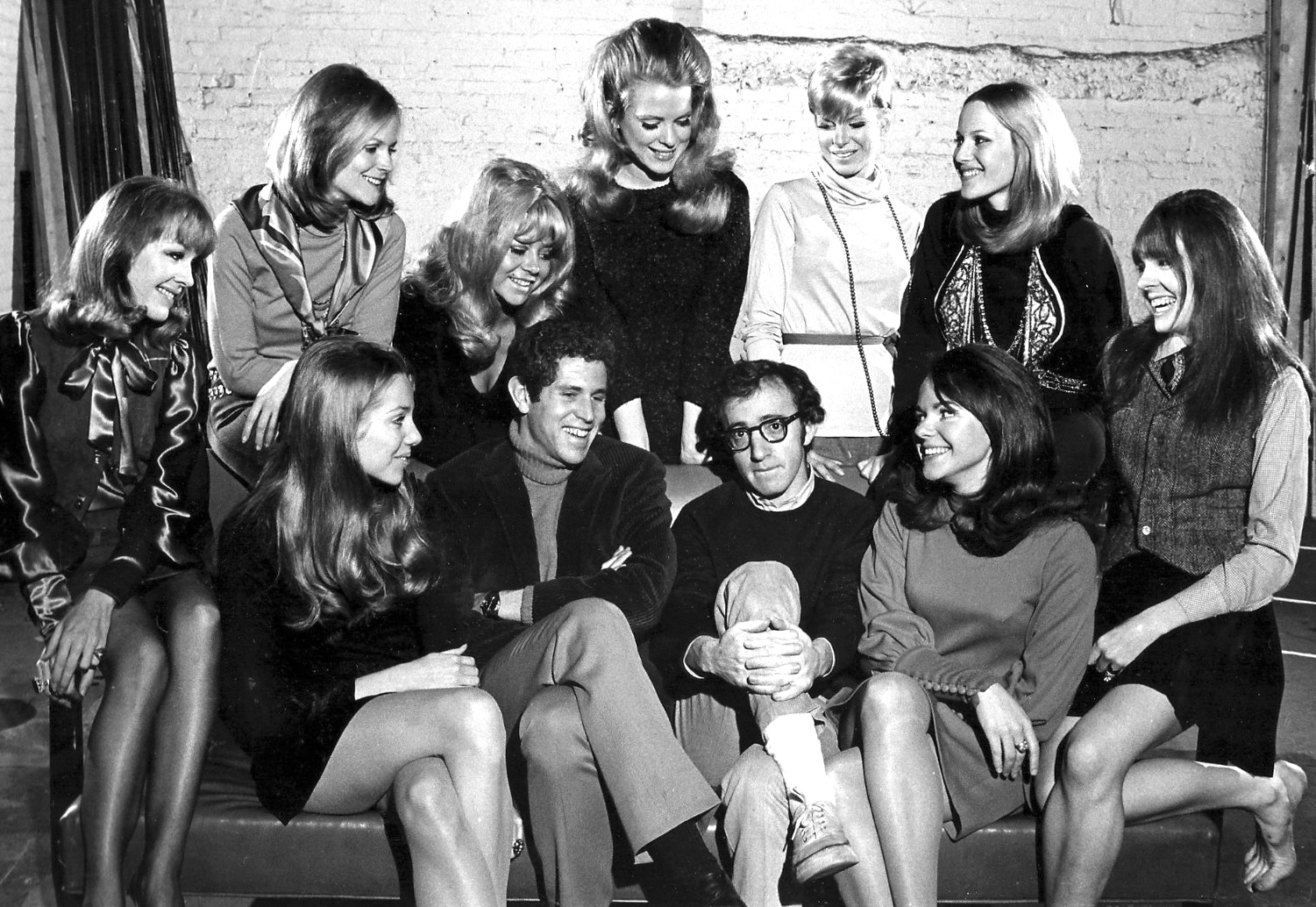
From the original Broadway cast of Play It Again, Sam. Third from left in front row is Tony Roberts; fourth from left is Woody Allen. Diane Keaton is on the far right. (1969)

Roberts often collaborated with Woody Allen. In Annie Hall, he portrayed Alvy Singer's best friend, Rob. Other Allen movies and plays in which he appeared include both the Broadway and movie versions of Play It Again, Sam; Stardust Memories (1980), A Midsummer Night's Sex Comedy (1982), Hannah and Her Sisters (1986) and Radio Days (1987). In 2001, Roberts appeared in Allen's respective segment for The Concert for New York City.

Roberts portrayed Deputy Mayor Warren LaSalle in The Taking of Pelham One Two Three. He also appeared in the Sidney Lumet movies Serpico and Just Tell Me What You Want. In a rare, big-screen leading role, Roberts starred in the 1983 horror movie Amityville 3-D as John Baxter, a deeply skeptical tabloid journalist who buys a haunted house. He appeared opposite George Burns (as his son) in 1988's Eighteen Again!, and co-starred in the horror-dark comedy Popcorn as Professor Davis, and in Blake Edwards's situation comedy Switch as Arnold Freidkin, both 1991 theatrical releases. Roberts also appeared in the Walt Disney screwball comedy The Million Dollar Duck and the stage-to-screen adaptation of Star Spangled Girl, both 1971 (and both co-starring Sandy Duncan); Le Sauvage (1975); Key Exchange (1985); 1986's Seize the Day; and 2005's Twelve and Holding.

Roberts's last theatrically released feature film role was as Jason Bateman's character's therapist in the 2014 independent romantic comedy-drama The Longest Week. His final made-for-television film portrayal was in the 2017 ABC production Dirty Dancing.

Roberts's Broadway credits include Barefoot in the Park; How Now, Dow Jones; Murder at the Howard Johnson's; Promises, Promises; Sugar (the musical version of the movie Some Like It Hot); The Sisters Rosensweig; They're Playing Our Song; Victor/Victoria; The Tale of the Allergist's Wife; Arsenic and Old Lace; and Cabaret. In 1998, he played Buddy Plummer in Stephen Sondheim's Follies at the Paper Mill Playhouse in New Jersey. In 2007, Roberts returned to Broadway in the musical Xanadu.

On television, Roberts played Lee Pollock on The Edge of Night. He appeared in numerous television series such as The Carol Burnett Show, Matlock, Law & Order, and Law & Order: Criminal Intent. In 1977, he was featured, alongside Squire Fridell, as a lead in the short-lived NBC legal drama Rosetti and Ryan.

In 1978, he guest-starred on The Love Boat. Roberts and Lauren Tewes's character, cruise ship director Julie McCoy, fall in love, but in the end do not pursue a romantic relationship. Roberts was featured (with Penny Fuller, who had played his wife on The Edge of Night) on the ABC comedy The Thorns. He was a regular performer on the CBS Radio Mystery Theater. Roberts also recorded many of the audiobook adaptations of Stuart Woods's novels. His other audiobook credits include Andrew Vachss's Batman: The Ultimate Evil, Kurt Vonnegut's Cat's Cradle, and Spencer Johnson's Who Moved My Cheese?.

== Personal life and death ==
Roberts was married to Jennifer Lyons from 1969 until they divorced in 1975. They had one child.

Roberts died of lung cancer at his Manhattan home on February 7, 2025 at the age of 85.

== Acting credits ==
=== Film ===
Year	Title	Role	Director	Notes	Ref.
1971	The Million Dollar Duck	Fred Hines	Vincent McEveety		
1971	Star Spangled Girl	Andy Hobart	Jerry Paris		
1972	Play It Again, Sam	Dick	Herbert Ross		
1973	Serpico	Bob Blair	Sidney Lumet		
1974	The Taking of Pelham One Two Three	Warren LaSalle	Joseph Sargent		
1975	Le Sauvage	Alex Fox	Jean-Paul Rappeneau		
1977	Annie Hall	Rob	Woody Allen		
1980	Just Tell Me What You Want	Mike Berger	Sidney Lumet		
1980	Stardust Memories	Tony	Woody Allen		
1982	A Midsummer Night's Sex Comedy	Maxwell	Woody Allen		
1983	Amityville 3-D	John Baxter	Richard Fleischer		
1985	Key Exchange	David Slattery	Barnet Kellman		
1986	Hannah and Her Sisters	Norman	Woody Allen		
1986	Seize the Day	Bernie Pell	Fielder Cook		
1987	Radio Days	"Silver Dollar" Emcee	Woody Allen		
1988	18 Again!	Arnie Watson	Paul Flaherty		
1991	Popcorn	Professor Davis	Mark Herrier		
1991	Switch	Arnold Freidkin	Blake Edwards		
1996	Apologies to Buñuel	Steve	Debbie Elbin		
1998	Dead Broke	Walter	Edward Vilga		
2001	My Best Friend's Wife	Mr. Epstein	Doug Finelli		
2005	Twelve and Holding	Doctor	Michael Cuesta		
2006	Well Fed and Comfortable	Mr. Barnes	Lou Howe	Short film	
2013	An Anomaly	Performer	Charlie Scharfman	Short film	
2014	The Longest Week	Barry the Therapist	Peter Glanz		

=== Television ===
Year	Title	Role	Notes
1965	The Trials of O'Brien	Charlie	1 episode
1965, 1966	The Edge of Night	Lee Pollock	2 episodes
1969	A Guide for the Married Man	Ed Stander	TV movie
1970	Men at Law	Jack Halbert	1 episode
1971	Love, American Style	Chris	1 episode
1971	Night Gallery	Dr. Morris Levine	1 episode
1975	Phyllis	Jerry	1 episode
1976	The Lindbergh Kidnapping Case	Lt. Jim Finn	TV movie
1976	Snafu	Conroy	TV movie
1977	McMillan and Wife	Philip Bainbridge	1 episode
1978, 1979	The Love Boat	Jack Chenault	3 episodes
1979	The Girls in the Office	Mike Holden	TV movie
1980	If Things Were Different	Michael Boden	TV movie
1982	A Question of Honor	Marlowe	TV movie
1983	Packin' It In	Charlie Baumgartner	TV movie
1983, 1985	Trapper John, M.D.	Lawrence Kolleeny / Dr. Jerry Kulyn	2 episodes
1984	The Four Seasons	Ted Bolen	13 episodes
1985	Finder of Lost Loves	Thad Holcombe	1 episode
1985	The Lucie Arnaz Show	Jim Gordon	6 episodes
1985	Hotel	Brian Fox	1 episode
1987	A Different Affair	Jeffrey Newman	TV movie
1988	The Thorns	Sloan Thorn	12 episodes
1991	Matlock	Guy Palmer	1 episode
1991	The Carol Burnett Show	Various skit characters	2 episodes
1991, 1994, 1998, 2010	Law & Order	Lucas Pollard / Nicholas Bennett; Paul Redfield / Senator Bryce Peterson	4 episodes
1991	Our Sons	Harry	TV movie
1992	Murder, She Wrote	Devon "Sonny" Lane	1 episode
1993	Not in My Family	Psychotherapist	TV movie
1993	The American Clock	Jesse Livermore	TV movie
1994	All My Children	Dr. Eisenstein	1 episode
1995	The Case of the Jealous Jokester	Ted Joplin	Perry Mason TV movie
1995	Victor/Victoria	Carol "Toddy" Todd	TV movie
2001	The Concert for New York City	Man on Bench	Segment: "Sounds from a Town I Love"; TV movie and live concert special
2001	American Masters	Narrator	1 episode
2004	Married to the Kellys	Martin Wagner	1 episode
2008	Law & Order: Criminal Intent	Ziggy Gold	1 episode
2015	Dinner with Family with Brett Gelman and Friends	Tony Roberts / Himself	TV movie
2017	Dirty Dancing	Max Kellerman	TV movie

=== Theater ===
Year	Title	Role	Venue	Ref.
1962	Something About a Soldier	Air Cadet / a Soldier	Ambassador Theatre, Broadway	
1964	The Last Analysis	Max	Belasco Theatre, Broadway	
1965	Barefoot in the Park	Paul Bratter	Biltmore Theatre, Broadway	
1966–1968	Don't Drink the Water	Axel Magee	Morosco Theatre, Broadway	
1967–1968	How Now, Dow Jones	Charlie	Lunt-Fontanne Theatre, Broadway	
1969–1970	Play It Again, Sam	Dick Christie	Broadhurst Theatre, Broadway	
1970	Promises, Promises	Chuck Baxter	Shubert Theatre, Broadway	
1972–1973	Sugar	Joe	Majestic Theatre, Broadway	
1974–1976	Absurd Person Singular	Geoffrey	Music Box Theatre, Broadway	
1979–1981	They're Playing Our Song	Vernon Hersch	Imperial Theatre, Broadway	
1979	Murder at the Howard Johnson's	Mitchell Lavell	John Golden Theatre, Broadway	
1985–1986	Doubles	George	Ritz Theatre, Broadway	
1986–1987	Arsenic and Old Lace	Mortimer Brewster	46th Street Theatre, Broadway	
1989–1990	Jerome Robbins' Broadway	The Setter / Emcee / Pseudolus / Pa / Cigar / Tevye / Floy	Imperial Theatre, Broadway	
1992–1993	The Seagull	Dr. Dorn	Lyceum Theatre, Broadway	
1994	The Sisters Rosensweig	Mervyn Kant	Ethel Barrymore Theatre, Broadway	
1995–1997	Victor/Victoria	Carroll "Toddy" Todd	Marquis Theatre, Broadway	
2000–2002	The Tale of the Allergist's Wife	Ira	Ethel Barrymore Theatre, Broadway	
2003–2004	Cabaret	Herr Schultz	Studio 54, Broadway	
2005	Endgame	Hamm	Irish Repertory Theatre, Off-Broadway	
2006	Barefoot in the Park	Victor Velasco	Cort Theatre, Broadway	
2007–2008	Xanadu	Danny Maguire / Zeus	Helen Hayes Theatre, Broadway	
2009	The Royal Family	Oscar Wolfe	Samuel J. Friedman Theatre, Broadway	

=== Radio ===
Year	Title	Role	Notes
1974–1982	CBS Radio Mystery Theatre	Officer / Dan / Ned Murray / Prof. Steve Ramsey / Bill / Peter Jackson / David / Salvador / Harry / Steve / James Blake / Todd Stearns / Hugh / Mike Slater / Cash Haliday / Billy Chapman / Peter Carlsen / Tim Lang / Tom Porter / Bobby Boyle / Stuart Belden / Dr. Harold W. Smiley / John Surratt / Ted / various other characters	82 episodes

== Awards and nominations ==
- How Now, Dow Jones — Nominee — Tony Award for Best Actor in a Musical (1968)
- Play It Again, Sam — Nominee — Tony Award for Best Featured Actor in a Play (1969)
