= Shohei Ohtani: Beyond the Dream =

2023 baseball documentary

Shohei Ohtani: Beyond the Dream is a sports documentary film about Shohei Ohtani and his beginnings in rural Japan to his success with the Los Angeles Angels. The film premiered on November 17, 2023, on ESPN+ in the US and will stream on Disney+ internationally.

== See also ==
- List of baseball films
