= From the Submerged =

1912 American silent film

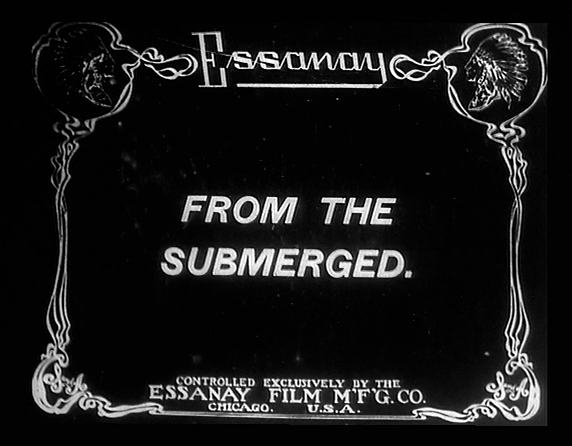
- Still frame from beginning of film
- Directed by: Theodore Wharton
- Written by: Theodore Wharton
- Starring: E. H. Calvert; Ruth Stonehouse; Dolores Cassinelli
- Distributed by: Essanay Film
- Release date: November 12, 1912
- Running time: 11:27
- Country: United States
- Language: Silent (English intertitles)

From the Submerged is a 1912 American silent short film. The melodrama was written and directed by Theodore Wharton, and stars E.H. Calvert, Ruth Stonehouse, Mildred Weston, Dolores Cassinelli, Bryant Washburn and Billy Mason. It was distributed by The Essanay Film Manufacturing Company, and was filmed on location in Chicago.

The short film was a one reel production, and released on November 12, 1912. It was later released in 2007, as part of a compilation box set, through the National Film Preservation Foundation. The film is also archived at the George Eastman House, the Library of Congress; the British Film Institute, and the American Film Institute.

The film received generally positive reviews and was noted for its emotional and social themes of suicide, humanity, wealthy and poor characters, and the bread line scenes.

== Cast ==
- E.H. Calvert
- Ruth Stonehouse
- William Walters
- Joseph Allen Sr.
- Mildred Weston
- Fred Wulf
- Charles Hitchcock
- Dolores Cassinelli
- Bryant Washburn
- Billy Mason

== Plot ==
It might as well be now as any time, he muttered savagely. A swift glance from one end of the bridge to the other showed that there were no interfering passers-by to dread. He cast one look at the stars, blinking at him thru a thick pall of fog, another one at the swirling black water beneath him. Then, his hand was on the rail, his body bent forward, his muscles drawn tense.

The man, a poor vagrant, is about to cast himself into the river when he is stopped and started upon the right road by the poor girl. He discovers his father is advertising to learn his whereabouts, returns home, is forgiven and finds a fortune at his command. Some time later he is engaged to the rich girl and a slumming party is made up one night. They visit Chinatown and pass the well-known bread line, at which the rich girl sneers and laughs.

Realizing how little of real life she knows, the man, disgusted with the social whirl of her class, dons his old attire and wanders down by the river for a breath of fresh air. Here it is that the poor girl, more wretched and ragged than ever, comes to cast herself into the black waters. As she had saved him once, so now does he prevent her from carrying out her design, recognizes her and leads her tenderly to his beautiful home as his wife for all time. —Synopsis (1912) from The Moving Picture World

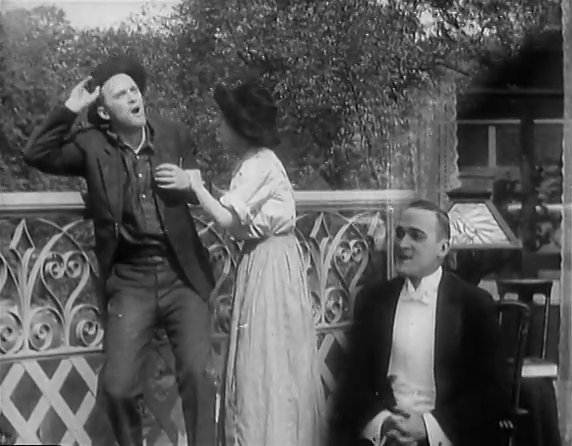
Remembering the scene on the bridge, superimposed

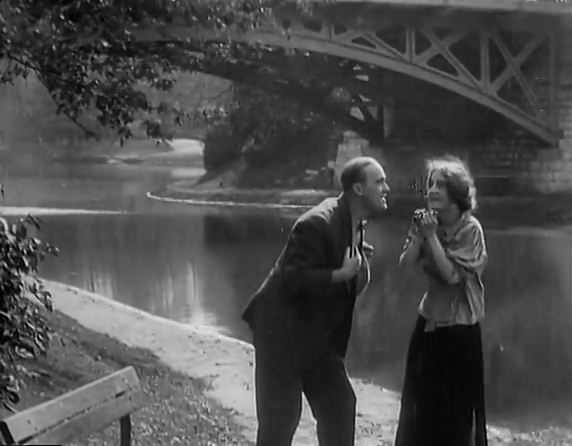
Scene in the park from under the bridge

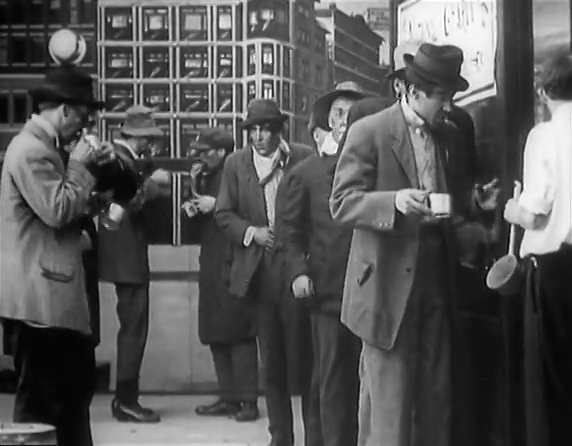
Standing in the bread line

== Background ==
Director Theodore Wharton, started out as a director for Pathe Freres, before moving to Essanay. He was regarded as being a pioneer in the film industry, making an impression on his colleagues for his innovative use of superimpositions; as seen near the end of the movie where Calvert remembers his encounter with the young woman on the bridge, with a flashback shot of the meeting superimposed above his head.

== Location ==
The film was shot on location in Chicago, with scenes filmed in Lincoln Park, along the Chicago River, and on Argyle street in Uptown, Chicago, across from Essanay Studios, which produced and distributed the film.

The film's ending scene where Calvert saves Stonehouse from going into the water, was ironically shot beneath the "suicide bridge", (Note: A four-story bridge over Lincoln Park lagoon south of Fullerton and east of Lincoln Park Zoo. There are dozens of stories of people throughout the years jumping from the bridge. The press began to call it the "Suicide Bridge.") which has since been destroyed.

== Themes ==
Barbara Tepa Lupack writes in her book, Silent Serial Sensations: The Wharton Brothers and the Magic of Early Cinema, that the story is one of "loss and redemption". She said the film is especially notable, quoting Michael Glover Smith, for the film's "social criticism, the ironic juxtaposition of wealthy and poor characters, the bread line scenes, and the use of an internally rhyming structure." She also noted the film's beginning and ending with suicide scenes in the same park, and that when you combine all these elements from the film, it shows the "influence of D.W. Griffith’s groundbreaking A Corner in Wheat from 1909."

Lupack says the most "indelible scenes, though, are those that depict the humanity of the suffering and hungry men in the bread line, who are quick to give away their own food to those who need it even more than they do, in a stark contrast to the self-centered and self-absorbed wealthy partygoers who exhibit little humanity for their own".

Film critic Michael Grutchfield also says the film is about redemption, and "urban poverty" as well. He argues that the story "contains a message about the worth of every human life". He also states that slumming parties are a "common element of many movies about social issues", and according to him, "rich people really did like to visit crime and poverty ridden areas as tourists at the time, and many social reformers criticized the practice".

In 1912, the Evening Capital News remarked that the "story has a strong heart appeal, not from the sentimental angle only, but from the sympathetic as well. It brings us in touch with the people in the bread line, and with pampered society folks who have never known the pinch of want. It shows us that poverty begets sympathy and that wealth has the tendency to breed selfishness and apathy, when those who possess it fail to keep in touch with their less fortunate creatures".

== Release and preservation ==
The film was released to theaters and nickelodeons on one reel, on November 12, 1912.

In 2007, the film was published along with 47 other films, in a box set consisting of 4 DVDs, titled Treasures III: Social Issues in American Film, 1900–1934. The compilation was released through the National Film Preservation Foundation, as part of their Treasures from American Film Archives series. The box set includes a 200-page illustrated book with film notes and credits

The film is also archived at the George Eastman Museum in Rochester, New York; the Library of Congress; the British Film Institute in London; and the American Film Institute in Los Angeles.

== Critical reception ==
=== Contemporaneous reviews ===
The Alton Evening Telegraph praised the film as a "subtle tense superb dramatic masterpiece, portrayed by the Essanay eastern players, a photoplay for long remembrance". The Evansville Courier and Press said it was an "interesting drama founded upon an entirely new theme and one that introduces many realistic and startling effects". The Meriden Daily Journal referenced the ending where he meets the girl who saves him, and the reunion of two hearts that have risen "from the submerged" is made complete.

The Moving Picture World criticized the film, saying: "there is a fine idea behind this picture; but, nevertheless, it comes short of being a first class offering. It lacks probability as it is handled and, while E. H. Calvert, the leading player, does very well as the rich man. his tramp didn't ring true. It seemed overworked to excite pity which, except when done with great art, is apt to displease. On a slumming excursion, he finds that this girl is hard hearted and goes back to lowly life to find the first girl, arriving in time to save her from suicide. Then they are married. We can't help thinking that this double attempt at suicide is too improbable to be effective. There are good slum views; but these are no novelty".

Film reviewer James McQuade said the film was a "well staged and well enacted photodrama". He praised Stonehouse and Cassinelli for giving strong "portraitures of the poor girl and the rich girl, respectively". McQuade also said there are "several fine scenes in this photoplay, notably those showing the bread line, the fashionable reception party and the slums of Chinatown. The settings are artistic and the photography is excellent.

=== Modern reviews ===
Film critic Michael Grutchfield said the script doesn't give either "Stonehouse or Cassinelli much chance to show their ability, although Stonehouse is good when she talks Calvert down from his suicide attempt. Cassinelli has sort of an Italian diva-quality that I’d like to see more of. The filming is pretty standard for the time, with limited camera movements and simplistic editing, but it works to propel the story".

Independent filmmaker Michael Glover Smith said that "while the plot is similar to that of the contrived Victorian-style melodramas common to the era, the film is sensitively directed and well acted. There is also a lot more psychological and emotional complexity than what one typically finds in a movie from 1912. A scene of the young man tearing up a photograph of his fiancée, for instance, visually represents the end of their engagement. While this is, in itself, a familiar movie image, what really impresses about the moment is the way that E.H. Calvert slowly and sadly shakes his head while tearing up the picture, a subtle and exquisite bit of film acting".

== Gallery ==
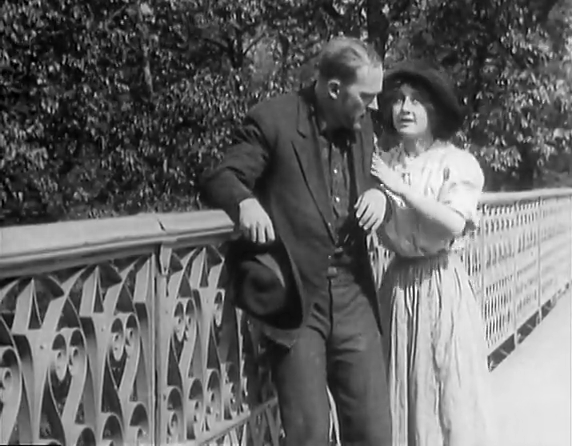
Being rescued on the bridge at beginning of film

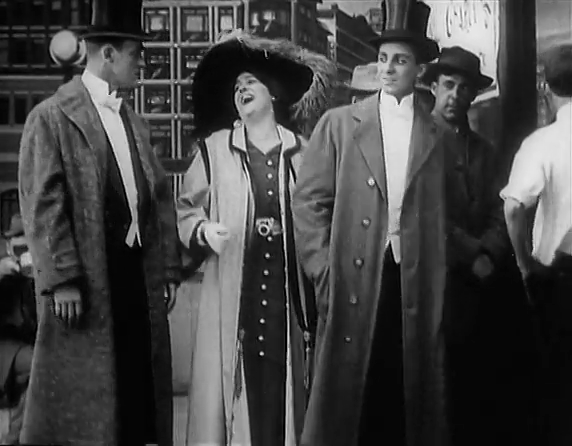
Slum partying, she's laughing at the poor people, he decides to break up with her afterwards

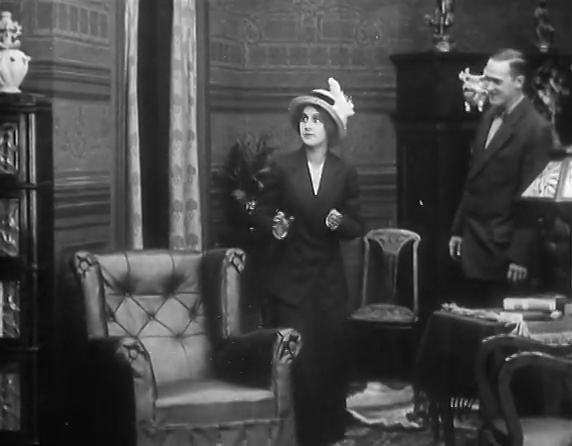
Arriving home after getting married, realizing her husband is wealthy

== See also ==
- 1912 in film
- Silent film
- Silent films category
- Silent film actors

== Sources ==
Books and magazines

- Chalmers, J. P., ed. (November 9, 1912). "Essanay – From the Submerged". The Moving Picture World. 14 (6). New York City: Chalmers Publishing Company.
- Lupack, Barbara Tepa (April 15, 2020). "Seeking Old Opportunity". Silent Serial Sensations: The Wharton Brothers and the Magic of Early Cinema. Cornell University Press. pp. 30–31. ISBN 978-1-5017-4820-2.
- Olden, John (December 1912). Brewster, Eugene V. (ed.). "From the Submerged". Motion Picture Story Magazine. Vol. 4, no. 2. Brooklyn, New York. pp. 61–68.

Newspapers

- "At The Picture Shows". Evening Capital News. Boise, Idaho. November 17, 1912. p. 5.
- "The Essanay Co. – From the Submerged". Alton Evening Telegraph. Alton, Illinois. November 30, 1912. p. 8.
- "The Orpheum". Evansville Courier and Press. Evansville, Indiana. December 5, 1912. p. 3.
- "Amusements". The Meriden Daily Journal. Meriden, Connecticut. December 9, 1912. p. 7.
- Phillips, Michael (July 22, 2007). "When Chicago Created Hollywood; 100 Years Ago, Essanay Films Made The City A Moviemaking Center". Chicago Tribune. Chicago, Illinois. ProQuest 420597748.

Online sources

- Baer, Geoffrey (January 21, 2013). "The Sad Story of Lincoln Park's 'Suicide Bridge'". WTTW News.
- Bennett, Carl (October 18, 2010). "Silent Era: Progressive Silent Film List". Silent Era. Archived from the original on December 19, 2022.
- Grutchfield, Michael (June 2, 2017). "From the Submerged (1912)". Century Film Project. Archived from the original on June 2, 2023.
- Smith, Michael Glover (October 1, 2012). "The Secret History of Chicago Movies: From the Submerged". White City Cinema. Archived from the original on November 10, 2012.
