= 4192: The Crowning of the Hit King =

- Film poster
- Directed by: Terry Lukemire
- Produced by: Aymie Majerski
- Starring: Pete Rose, Marty Brennaman, Tony Pérez, Mike Schmidt
- Narrated by: J.K. Simmons
- Cinematography: Jeremy Whitcomb
- Edited by: Terry Lukemire
- Music by: Douglas Thornton, Robert Pollard
- Production company: Barking Fish Entertainment
- Release date: October 22, 2010
- Country: United States
- Language: English

4192: The Crowning of the Hit King is a 2010 documentary film that follows the exploits and achievements of Pete Rose, a baseball player. The film, directed by Terry Lukemire, is narrated by J. K. Simmons. The film stars Marty Brennaman, Tony Pérez, Mike Schmidt, and Pete Rose himself, who relay the struggle and effort it took to make history through America's favorite pastime.

== Synopsis ==
On the evening of September 11, 1985, before a sellout crowd at Riverfront Stadium in Cincinnati, Pete Rose was about to make history. He needed one more hit to set the major league baseball hits record. 4192: The Crowning of the Hit King highlights the playing career of one of the game's most honored and controversial stars. It is a story that began in 1963 when Rose ran to first base on a walk. It spanned more than two decades and brought numerous individual awards as well as three World Series titles. The story is also about baseball and what drove Rose to chase what many thought was an unbreakable record and become known as "The Hit King."

== Cast ==
- Pete Rose - As Himself
- Marty Brennaman - As Himself
- Tony Pérez - As Himself
- Mike Schmidt - As Himself
- J.K. Simmons - Narrator

== See also ==
- List of baseball films
