= Saïd Sayrafiezadeh =

American dramatist

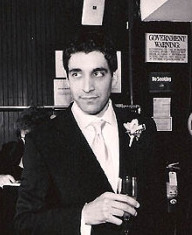
- Born: December 26, 1968 (age 57); Brooklyn (New York), U.S.
- Occupation: Author
- Spouse: Karen Mainenti
- Parent: Mahmoud Sayrafiezadeh (father)
- Writing career
- Period: 21st century
- Genres: memoir, plays, fiction
- Notable awards: Whiting Award
- Website: www.sayrafiezadeh.com

Saïd Sayrafiezadeh (Persian: سعید صیرفی‌زاده; /sɑːˈiːd ˌsɛərəfiˈzɑːdeɪ/; born 1968) is an American memoirist, playwright and fiction writer living in New York City. He won a 2010 Whiting Award for his memoir, When Skateboards Will Be Free. He is the author of two story collections, American Estrangement (2021) and Brief Encounters With the Enemy, which was short-listed for the 2014 PEN/Robert W. Bingham Prize for debut fiction. He serves on the board of directors for the New York Foundation for the Arts.

== Early life and education ==
Sayrafiezadeh was born in Brooklyn, New York, to an Iranian father, Mahmoud Sayrafiezadeh, and an American Jewish mother, Martha Harris, both of whom were members of the Socialist Workers Party. He was raised in Pittsburgh, Pennsylvania. His maternal uncle was the novelist Mark Harris. He lives in New York City.

He attended the University of Pittsburgh, but dropped out his senior year.

== Work ==
Sayrafiezadeh has published essays and short stories in a number of outlets, including The New Yorker, The Paris Review, The New York Times, Granta, and McSweeney's.

His plays include New York is Bleeding, Autobiography of a Terrorist, All Fall Away, and Long Dream in Summer. They have been produced or read at South Coast Repertory, New York Theatre Workshop, The Humana Festival of New American Plays, and at The Sundance Theatre Lab.

Sayrafiezadeh has also published a memoir about his childhood in the Socialist Workers Party.

He has published two short story collections, Brief Encounters with the Enemy in 2013 and American Estrangement in 2021. The latter includes "Audition", a story based on his experiences with drug addiction and as an aspiring actor.

== Bibliography ==
=== Short fiction ===
Collections

- Sayrafiezadeh, Saïd (2013). Brief encounters with the enemy.
- — (2021). American estrangement.

Stories

Title	Year	First published	Reprinted/collected	Notes
A, S, D, F	2021	Sayrafiezadeh, Saïd (May 31, 2021). "A, S, D, F". The New Yorker. 97 (14): 50–56.		

- Sayrafiezadeh, Saïd (Spring 2006). "Most Livable City". The Paris Review. 176.
- — (Winter 2014). "Metaphor of the Falling Cat". The Paris Review. 211.
- — (March 1, 2010). "Appetite". The New Yorker. 87 (44): 58–63.
- — (February 28, 2011). "Paranoia". The New Yorker. 87 (44): 58–63.
- — (January 16, 2012). "A Brief Encounter with the Enemy". The New Yorker. 87 (44): 58–63.
- — (July 28, 2014). "Last Meal at Whole Foods". The New Yorker. 90 (21): 64–69.
- — (September 10, 2018). "Audition". The New Yorker. 90 (21): 64–69.

=== Essays and reporting ===
- Sayrafiezadeh, Saïd (October 5, 2013). "Howard Stern, My Literary Idol". The New York Times.
- — (January 29, 2014). "Remembering My Mother's Obsession". The New York Times.
- — (October 25, 2014). "My Mother's Psychotherapy and Mine". The New York Times.
- — (August 13, 2016). "How to Write About Trauma". The New York Times.
- — (October 29, 2016). "The Ultimate Protest Vote". The New York Times.
- — (August 26, 2017). "Two Lessons in Prejudice". The New York Times.

=== Memoirs ===
- Sayrafiezadeh, Saïd (2009). When skateboards will be free: a memoir of a political childhood.
