= My Life in China =

2014 documentary film

My Life in China is a 2014 documentary film directed by Kenneth Eng. The film follows the 2007 journey of a Chinese American man, Yau King Eng, the father of the film’s director, tracing the path he made decades before from his home village in China near Toisan in Guangdong province to Hong Kong and then to the United States. Technically, the film shows the original journey retrospectively from the present time living in the United States with his family and subsequently when Yau King Eng returns many years later to visit his home village in China with his American born son Kenneth.

== Reception ==
The film was presented as follows: "An unvarnished portrait of the life and memories of a stoic and reticent man committed to his family."

In an article in Asian Studies Carol Stepanchuk stated: ”The film begins at the arched gateway (paifang) to Boston’s Chinatown and ends at an elaborate gateway to Toisan—a metaphor of Old China and New China, transition and compromise, community and culture. Through Eng’s film, students can begin a conversation to appreciate the trans-Pacific as a thoroughfare that may build new lines of communication and join what has been separated."

The film was nominated for ”Best Documentary at the Milano International Film Festival”.
