= Hard Boiled (1919 film) =

1919 film by Victor Schertzinger

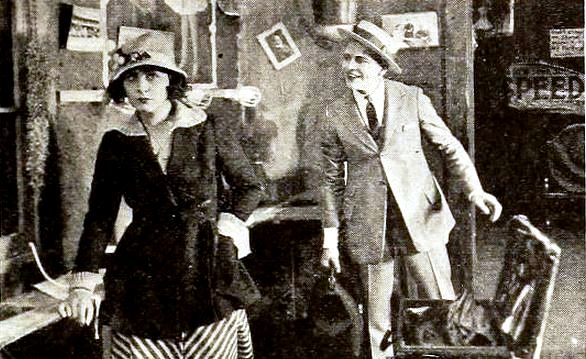
- Still with Dorothy Dalton and Billy Mason
- Directed by: Victor Schertzinger
- Screenplay by: John Lynch; R. Cecil Smith
- Produced by: Thomas H. Ince
- Starring: Dorothy Dalton; Billy Mason; William Courtright; Gertrude Claire; Walter Hiers; Nona Thomas
- Cinematography: John Stumar
- Edited by: W. Duncan Mansfield
- Production company: Thomas H. Ince Corporation
- Distributed by: Paramount Pictures
- Release date: February 2, 1919
- Running time: 50 minutes
- Country: United States
- Language: Silent (English intertitles)

Hard Boiled is a 1919 American silent comedy film directed by Victor Schertzinger and written by John Lynch and R. Cecil Smith. The film stars Dorothy Dalton, Billy Mason, William Courtright, Gertrude Claire, Walter Hiers, and Nona Thomas. The film was released on February 2, 1919, by Paramount Pictures.

== Cast ==
- Dorothy Dalton as Corinne Melrose
- Billy Mason as Billy Penrose
- William Courtright as Deacon Simpson
- Gertrude Claire as Aunt Tiny Colvin
- Walter Hiers as Hiram Short
- Nona Thomas as Daisy May

== Preservation status ==
- A print survives in the Archives du Filmdu CNC (Bois d'Arcy) France.
