= Kokoyakyu: High School Baseball =

- Directed by: Kenneth Eng
- Written by: Alex Shear
- Produced by: Alex Shear; Takayo Nagasawa
- Cinematography: Jake Clennell
- Edited by: Kenneth Eng
- Music by: Karen Tanaka
- Release date: 2006
- Running time: 53 minutes
- Country: United States
- Language: English

Kokoyakyu: High School Baseball is a 2006 documentary film about high school baseball in Japan, the pastime that has turned into an obsession. The film follows two schools as they compete and head towards the 2003 (86th annual) tournament.

Kokoyakyu: High School Baseball was directed by Kenneth Eng and written/produced by Alex Shear. It was shown on PBS in the US in 2006 as part of its POV series.

== See also ==
- List of baseball films
