= Signs of the Time (film) =

- Promotional poster for Signs of the Time
- Directed by: Don Casper
- Produced by: Don Casper, Jim Hughes
- Narrated by: Richard Dreyfuss
- Distributed by: Crystal Pix, Inc.
- Release date: August 23, 2008
- Running time: 60 minutes
- Country: United States
- Language: English

Signs of the Time is a 60-minute American documentary film on the origin of hand signals in baseball. There are several myths in regard to how signals were started, and the film addresses some of the mysteries that led to umpires giving hand-signals to call plays in the field, base coaches to relay hand signals to players on the field, and catchers to relay hand signals to pitchers.

== Synopsis ==
Baseball of the 19th century was America's most popular spectator sport. Professional teams like the 1889 Brooklyn Bridegrooms drew nearly a half a million fans per season. Thousands of fans attended some of the earliest known games, but without the benefit of the signals on the diamond to tell them what was happening on the field. There were no signals for strike, safe, out or foul and no announcer to interpret the game. Prior to the invention of baseball signs, the only signal was the umpire's voice, often drowned out by the roar of thousands of excited fans. Signs of the Time explores the origins of this innovation and the baseball pioneers that changed the course of the game and history.

Several have laid claim to the signs and signals that have influenced America's game but only two deserve consideration. The first is Bill Klem, the most significant umpire of the last century and the first to be inducted into the Baseball Hall of Fame. He spent nearly forty years in professional baseball from 1905 to 1942, influencing many of the greatest legends of the game. He was well known for his authoritative style behind the plate and his boastful demeanor in public.

The second man was William "Dummy" Hoy, who since the age of two, was profoundly deaf and unable to speak. Hoy was drafted by the professional Oshkosh Baseball Club in 1886. Through his career from 1886 to 1903, Hoy was admired by his teammates, revered by the fans, and became the most celebrated deaf player in the history of big-league baseball.

Both of these men made significant contributions to the game and each has laid claim to the signs of baseball. Signs of the Time exposes the myths and mysteries of the game with anecdotes of the past, depictions of early baseball and interviews with the most influential names of the game.

== Release ==
A private cast, crew and media screening was held on August 23, 2008, at the George Eastman House in Rochester, New York.

The public film release was in Fall 2008.

== See also ==
- List of baseball films
