= Something About a Soldier =

Play by Ernest Kinoy

Something About a Soldier, subtitled "A Comedy-drama in Three Acts", was a play written by Emmy-winning writer Ernest Kinoy. It premiered on Broadway at the Ambassador Theatre in New York on January 4, 1962, after a preview the night before. In all, the show ran for 12 performances, closing on January 13, 1962.

== Plot ==
The play is based on a 1957 novel by Mark Harris and deals with the experiences of an idealistic young soldier in a Georgia-based Army training camp during World War II and the Army captain who, by hospitalizing him, saves him from the war.

== Actors ==
It featured Oscar nominee Sal Mineo in his first and only Broadway leading role as the young soldier, and also the supporting veteran stage and film actors Ralph Meeker and Kevin McCarthy, and newcomers Ken Kercheval and Tony Roberts.

== Producer ==
It was produced by the Theatre Guild and Dore Schary, who also directed the play.

== Reception ==
Although Sal Mineo's performance in the lead role was generally praised, reviews for the play as a whole were unenthusiastic.
