= It Might Happen to You =

1920 film by Alfred Santell

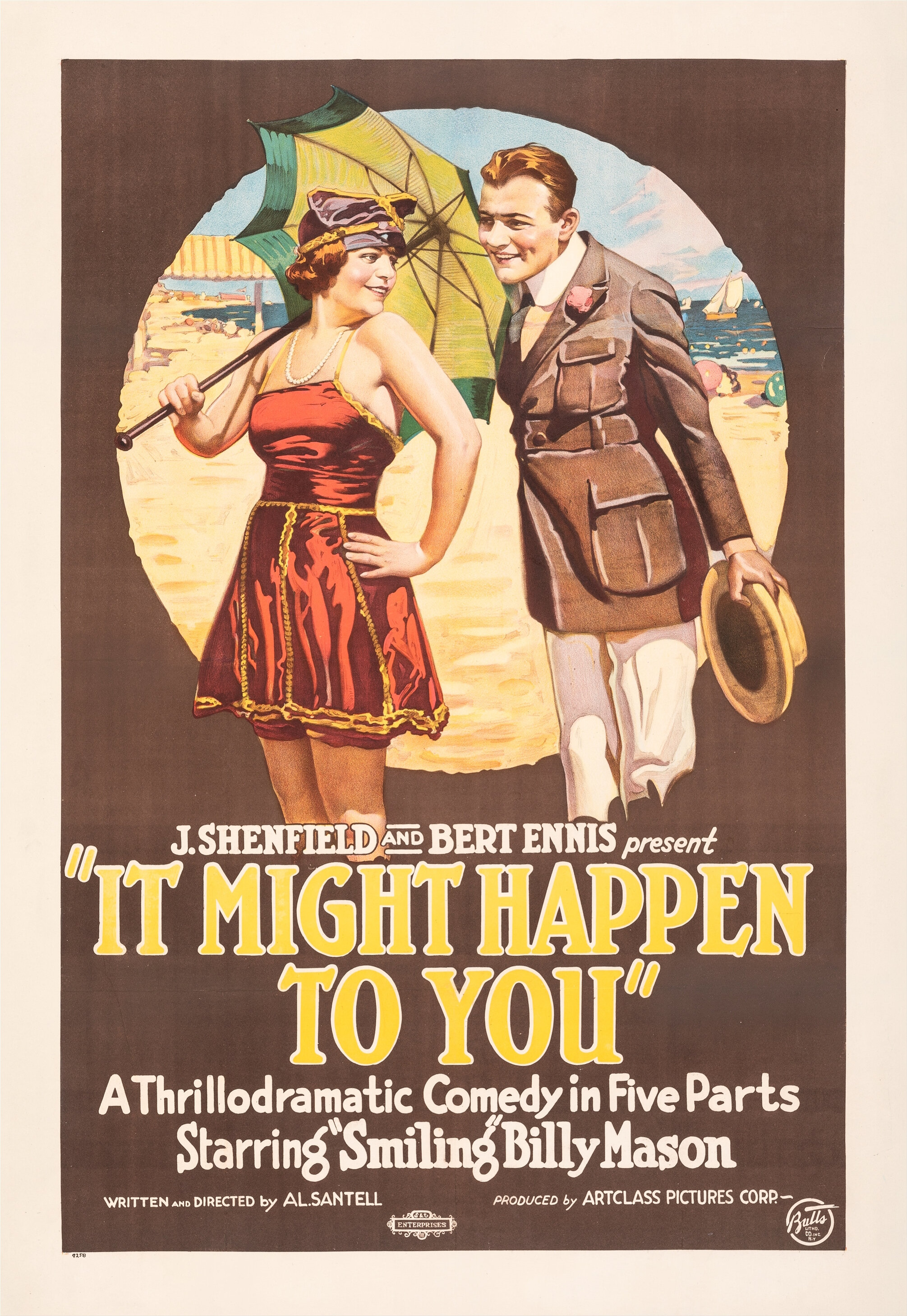
- Theatrical release poster
- Directed by: Alfred Santell
- Written by: Alfred Santell
- Produced by: Louis Weiss
- Starring: Billy Mason; Dorris Dare; William Harcourt
- Production company: Weiss Brothers Artclass Pictures
- Distributed by: S & E Enterprises
- Release date: November 1920
- Running time: 50 minutes
- Country: United States
- Languages: Silent; English intertitles

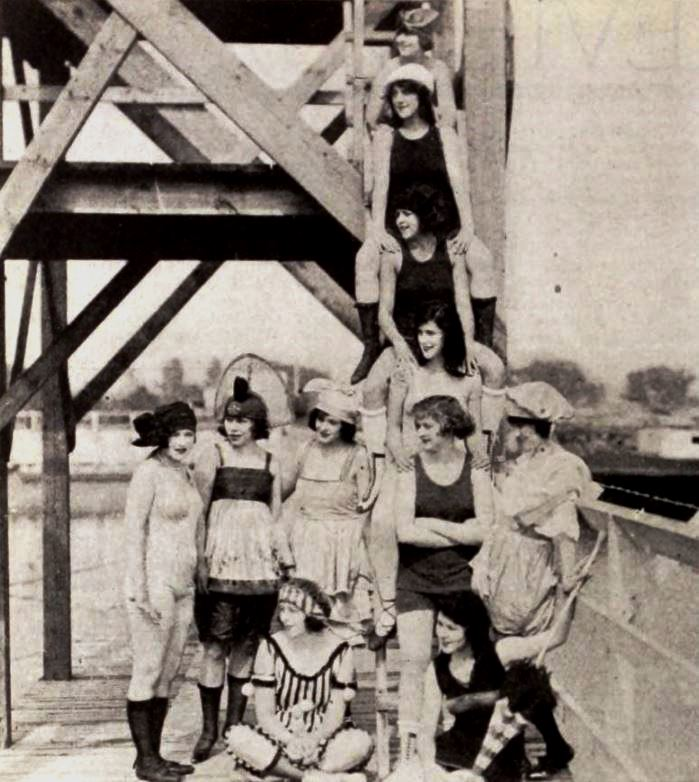
A still from the film

It Might Happen to You is a 1920 American silent comedy film directed by Alfred Santell and starring Billy Mason, Dorris Dare and William Harcourt.

== Cast ==
- Billy Mason as J. Worthington Butts Jr.
- Dorris Dare as Dolly Bender
- William Harcourt as Worthington Butts Sr.
- Walter Beckwith as Edward Winton
- Violet Mack as Tootsie
- Edward Scanlon as Jenks
- Helen Adams as Mrs. Butts

== Preservation ==
It is unknown whether the film survives as none of copies were able to locate, likely presumed lost.

== Bibliography ==
- Connelly, Robert B. The Silents: Silent Feature Films, 1910-36, Volume 40, Issue 2. December Press, 1998.
- Munden, Kenneth White. The American Film Institute Catalog of Motion Pictures Produced in the United States, Part 1. University of California Press, 1997.
