= Some Bride =

1919 film by Henry Otto

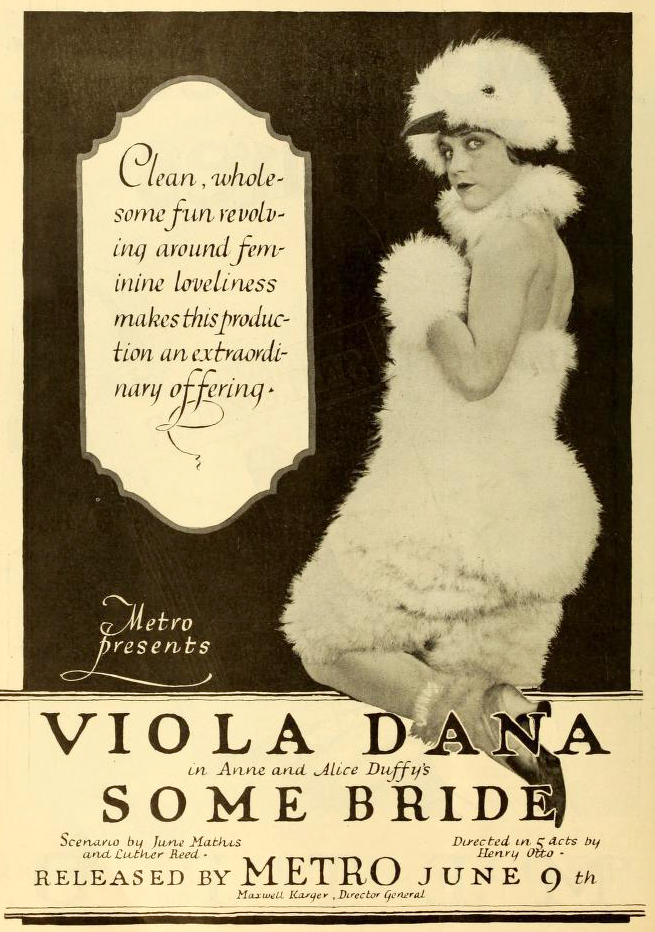
- period advertisement featuring Viola Dana
- Directed by: Henry Otto
- Written by: Alice Duffy (story); Anne Duffy (story); June Mathis (writer); Luther Reed (writer)
- Produced by: Maxwell Karger
- Starring: Viola Dana
- Cinematography: John Arnold
- Production company: Metro Pictures
- Distributed by: Metro Pictures
- Release date: June 9, 1919
- Running time: 5 reels
- Country: United States
- Language: Silent (English intertitles)

Some Bride is a 1919 American silent comedy film directed by Henry Otto and produced and distributed by Metro Pictures. It stars Viola Dana.

== Plot ==
As described in a film magazine, Patricia Morley (Dana) is a pretty, young bride whose flirtatious ways during their honeymoon at a summer resort keep her husband Henry (Cummings) in a state of constant anxiety. Henry's jealousy is attributed to a strain of Spanish blood, although any husband would be puzzled by Patricia's activities. When Patricia, at an old fashioned barn dance, acts out the role of a chicken hatching out of an egg and dances with other men due to Henry's sprained ankle, Henry's wrath blazes up, and he accuses her of being in love with another man and threatens to leave her. He packs his things, goes to New York City, and files for divorce. Patricia, brokenhearted, sends her friend Victoria (Sinclair) to tell Henry that his wife is dying. Patricia goes to the hospital where her hysterical conduct alarms the doctor and nurse. Later the nurse discovers that the bride is bluffing but is serious in her efforts to win back her husband. Henry arrives at the hospital just in time to see his wife acting out the role of a nurse to his divorce attorney Geoffrey Patten (Mason), who had broken his leg two days earlier. Henry again explodes in wrath, but finally makes up with Patricia, and they return to New York City, taking along the lawyer. Additional complications follow, but all ends happily.

== Cast ==
- Viola Dana as Patricia Morley
- Irving Cummings as Henry Morley
- Ruth Sinclair as Victoria French
- Billy Mason as Geoffrey Patten
- Florence Carpenter as Jane Grayson
- Jack Mower as Undetermined role
