= The Ball Game =

- Distributed by: Edison Manufacturing Company
- Release date: May 20, 1898
- Country: United States
- Language: Silent

The Ball Game is an 1898 American short black-and-white silent documentary sports film produced and distributed by Edison Manufacturing Company. It was directed by William Heise.

== Synopsis ==
The film contains footage of an 1898 baseball game between Reading Coal Heavers and the Newark Bears. The camera is situated twenty feet from first bases and a short extract of the game is then filmed.

== Current status ==
Given its age, this short film is available to freely be downloaded from the Internet. It has also featured in a number of film collections including Diamonds on the Silver Screen.

== See also ==
- List of baseball films
