= Baseball Madness =

1917 film

- Directed by: Billy Mason
- Written by: Billy Mason; Albert Russell
- Produced by: Victor Film Company
- Starring: Gloria Swanson
- Distributed by: Universal Pictures
- Release date: May 8, 1917
- Running time: 3 reels
- Country: United States
- Languages: Silent; English intertitles

Baseball Madness is a 1917 American silent comedy film directed by Billy Mason and starring Gloria Swanson.

== Cast ==
- Gloria Swanson
- Billy Mason
- Orin Jackson (as Orin C. Jackson)
- Mark Fenton
- Countess Du Cello (as Countess Mary Du Cello)
- Victor Potel

== See also ==
- List of baseball films
