= Billy Mason (performer) =

American film actor and director

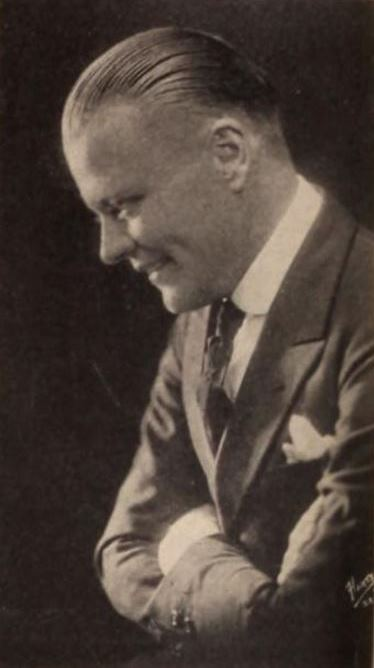
- Mason in 1920
- Born: April 1, 1889; Plankinton, South Dakota, U.S.
- Died: January 24, 1941 (aged 51); Orange, New Jersey, U.S.
- Occupations: Actor, director
- Years active: 1912–1921

Billy Mason (April 1, 1889 – January 24, 1941) was an American vaudeville performer and film comedian of the silent era. He appeared in over a hundred short films as well as several features. He also directed a handful of films, including Baseball Madness (1917) starring Gloria Swanson.

== Selected filmography ==
- From the Submerged (1912)
- The Snare (1912)
- The Right Direction (1916)
- A Dash of Courage (1916)
- Billy the Bandit (1916)
- Baseball Madness (1917)
- Some Bride (1919)
- Hard Boiled (1919)
- A Taste of Life (1919)
- The Wolf (1919)
- It Might Happen to You (1920)

== Bibliography ==
- Etulain, Richard W. Thunder in the West: The Life and Legends of Billy the Kid. University of Oklahoma Press, 2020.
- Massa, Steve. Slapstick Divas: The Women of Silent Comedy. BearManor Media, 2017.
