= Kenneth Eng =

American documentary filmmaker

- Born: Boston, Massachusetts
- Education: School of Visual Arts (NYC); Boston Latin School
- Occupations: Film director, editor
- Years active: 2004 - present
- Parent(s): Yau King Eng (father); Yuan Lin Eng (Wong)
- Website: https://www.kennetheng.com/

Kenneth Eng is an American documentary film director and editor. He is best known for his work on the documentary films My Life in China, Kokoyakyu: High School Baseball and Take Me to the River.

== Life and career ==
Kenneth was born and raised in Boston, Massachusetts. He graduated from Boston Latin School, afterward moved to New York to study film at the School of Visual Arts in 1994. His thesis film, Scratching Windows, about graffiti writers, was broadcast on PBS nationally.

Kenneth's documentary film, Take Me to the River, about the Maha Kumbh Mela festival in Allahabad, India. In 2006, he directed the feature documentary, Kokoyakyu: High School Baseball, about the Koshien Tournament in Japan, was broadcast on PBS nationally.

In 2014, Kenneth directed My Life in China, a documentary about his father Yau King Eng and his history since leaving China and coming to America, premiered at the San Diego Asian Film Festival.

== Filmography ==
Year	Film	Director	Editor
2004	Take Me to the River	Yes	Yes
2006	Kokoyakyu: High School Baseball	Yes	Yes
2012	Bikini Barbershop: Jersey		Yes
2014	My Life in China	Yes	Yes
2015	Tested		Yes
2016	Beartrek		Yes
2018	The Most Interesting Man in Show Business		Yes

== Awards and honors ==
- 2007 Guggenheim Fellowship
- 2015 - won Best Documentary Feature at the San Diego Asian Film Festival for My Life in China
