= Bang the Drum Slowly =

1956 novel by Mark Harris

- First edition hardback
- Author: Mark Harris
- Language: English
- Publisher: Alfred A. Knopf
- Publication date: 1956
- Publication place: United States
- Media type: Print (Hardback & Paperback)
- Preceded by: The Southpaw
- Followed by: Something about a Soldier

Bang the Drum Slowly is a novel by Mark Harris, first published in 1956 by Knopf. The novel is the second in a series of four novels written by Harris that chronicles the career of baseball player Henry W. Wiggen. Bang the Drum Slowly was a sequel to The Southpaw (1953), with A Ticket for a Seamstitch (1957) and It Looked Like For Ever (1979), completing the tetralogy of baseball novels by Harris.

The novel was made into a 1956 United States Steel Hour television adaptation starring Paul Newman and a later film adaptation in 1973, with Harris writing the screenplay. Bang the Drum Slowly was named one of the top 100 sports books of all time by Sports Illustrated and is the most popular of the four books published in this series, according to the Los Angeles Times. The last line of the novel, "From here on in I rag nobody", was ranked number 95 on American Book Review′s "100 Best Last Lines from Novels" in 2008.

== Background ==
Harris played baseball as a boy and often wrote about the game and was known for writing realistically about the sport in his novels. For this novel, Harris chose to write it in the vernacular of pitcher Henry Wiggen, who narrates the story in an inimitable fashion. Harris called it "ungrammar" and said that the book was written "out of a rebellion against formal language."

The title of the novel was inspired by lines from the song "Streets of Laredo", which is about a dying cowboy. It is sung by one of the ballplayers, Piney Woods, a back-up catcher, at a team gathering. The version of the song that he sings contains the lyrics, "Oh bang the drum slowly and play the fife lowly, and play the dead march as you carry me along..."

== Plot summary ==
Harris's narrator Henry "Author" Wiggen, a star pitcher, tells the story of a baseball season with the New York Mammoths, a fictional team based on the New York Giants, as noted in the author's book Diamond: The Baseball Writings of Mark Harris. In the novel, Wiggen befriends a slow-talking catcher from Georgia named Bruce Pearson who is more ridiculed than respected by his teammates. When Pearson learns he is terminally ill with Hodgkin's disease and is to be sent to the minor leagues, Wiggen rallies his teammates to keep the catcher among them and inspires Pearson to become a better player before his time runs out.

== Reception ==
One of the first reviews about the novel appeared in The New York Times in April 1956, by book reviewer Charles Poore, who wrote that "Bang the Drum Slowly is the finest baseball novel that has appeared since we all began to compare baseball novels with the works of Ring Lardner, Douglass Wallop and Heywood Broun. In its elementals, Bang the Drum Slowly has two familiar themes. One is the story of the way a doomed man may spend his last best year on earth. The other is the story of how a quarrelsome group of raucous individualists is welded into an effective combat outfit." New York Times sports columnist George Vecsey, wrote about the book; “[it] has one of the loveliest last lines in American literature, a regret from Wiggen for the way the players made fun of a slow-witted and now-dead teammate: ‘From here on in, I rag nobody.’”

Cordelia Candelaria, author of Seeking the Perfect Game: Baseball in American Literature, rated The Southpaw and Bang the Drum Slowly among the top five baseball novels ever written. The novel was also chosen as one of the top 100 sports books of all time by Sports Illustrated, and the 1973 film adaption is featured on numerous other lists of best baseball movies.

== Adaptations ==
The novel was first adapted for television and was broadcast live on the U.S. Steel Hour on September 24, 1956. It featured Paul Newman as Wiggen and Albert Salmi as catcher Bruce Pearson. George Peppard appeared as Piney Woods, the country-boy ballplayer who sings the ballad from which the novel's title is derived. The TV adaptation was faithful to the first-person singular style of the novel, by having Wiggen (Newman) periodically step out of the movie to address the audience.

Harris wrote the screenplay for the 1973 film adaptation, with Michael Moriarty portraying Wiggen, Robert De Niro as Pearson and Vincent Gardenia as manager Dutch Schnell. Gardenia was nominated for an Academy Award for Best Supporting Actor for his portrayal of Schnell. De Niro was nominated and won Best Supporting Actor, from the New York Film Critics Circle for his role of Pearson. The movie was also Danny Aiello's feature film debut. The film was directed by John D. Hancock and released by Paramount Pictures.

The novel was also adapted for the stage by Eric Simonson and had its professional premiere at the Huntington Theatre Company in Boston on March 11, 1994. The play was directed by Simonson, and David New starred as the "Author" Henry Wiggen, while Paul Sandberg played the role of catcher Bruce Pearson.

In 1992, Simonson partnered with L.A. Theatre Works to record an audiobook of the stage play adapted from the novel. The recording featured Ed Begley, Jr., David Schwimmer, Jonathan Silverman and Harry Shearer. The audio book is available to the general public in libraries and online retailers.
