= Bang the Drum Slowly (film) =

1973 film by John D. Hancock

- Theatrical release poster
- Directed by: John Hancock
- Screenplay by: Mark Harris
- Based on: Bang the Drum Slowly; 1956 novel by Mark Harris
- Produced by: Maurice Rosenfield; Lois Rosenfield
- Starring: Robert De Niro; Michael Moriarty; Vincent Gardenia
- Cinematography: Richard Shore
- Edited by: Richard Marks
- Music by: Stephen Lawrence
- Production companies: ANJA Films; BTDS Partnership
- Distributed by: Paramount Pictures
- Release date: August 26, 1973
- Running time: 96 minutes
- Country: United States
- Language: English
- Budget: $1 million

Bang the Drum Slowly is a 1973 American sports drama film directed by John D. Hancock, based on Mark Harris's novel Bang the Drum Slowly, which follows the friendship between a star pitcher and his terminally-ill catcher on a fictional Major League Baseball team. The film stars Michael Moriarty as Henry Wiggen, the team's star pitcher, and Robert De Niro as Bruce Pearson, his ill-fated catcher and close friend.

== Plot ==
Henry Wiggen is a star pitcher for the New York Mammoths, a fictional Major League Baseball team. He is a valuable player to his manager Dutch but is in a dispute with the team's ownership, holding out for a new contract and more money. Henry has a side job as an insurance salesman working for the Arcturus Corporation, with ballplayers as his clients. Henry's friend Bruce Pearson, the team's catcher, is a player of limited skill and intellect. Teammates call Henry by the nickname "Author" because he once wrote a book, although Bruce misunderstands and, with his thick Southern drawl, often calls him "Arthur" instead.

Henry and Bruce leave the Mayo Clinic in Minnesota, where Bruce has been told that he is terminally ill with Hodgkin's disease. They drive to Bruce's hometown in Georgia because Bruce has always wanted his only friend to see it. On their first night there, Bruce burns his baseball memorabilia to acknowledge the inevitable end of his life.

At spring training, Dutch is preparing to release Bruce in favor of a hot young prospect, country boy Piney Woods, so management is confused when Henry ends his holdout for a high salary and agrees to a new contract, the only condition being that he and Bruce come as a package. The Mammoths are losing games and have low morale, with teammates quarreling. Knowing that he is dying, Bruce wants Henry to change the beneficiary on his life insurance policy from his parents to his girlfriend Katie. Henry knows that she is interested only in Bruce's money, so he pretends to change it.

One day, when a player teases Bruce, Henry blurts out the fact that Bruce is dying. His teammates and Dutch begin to treat Bruce and each other differently, and the team's play and mood improve. Near the end of the season, Bruce becomes too ill to continue playing.

The team wins the World Series, but Bruce returns home to spend his final days with his parents. As they part at the airport, he asks Henry to send him a scorecard from the Series, which Henry laments that he never did.

After the season is over, Bruce dies, and Henry is the only member of the team to attend his funeral, serving as a pallbearer. While visiting Bruce's grave, Henry vows, "From here on in, I rag nobody."

== Cast ==
- Robert De Niro as Bruce Pearson
- Michael Moriarty as Henry Wiggen
- Vincent Gardenia as Dutch Schnell
- Phil Foster as Joe
- Heather MacRae as Holly
- Ann Wedgeworth as Katie
- Tom Ligon as Piney Woods
- Danny Aiello as Horse
- Selma Diamond as Tootsie
- Barbara Babcock as Team Owner
- Patrick McVey as Bruce's Father
- Marshall Efron as Bradley

== Production ==
The non-Florida baseball sequences were filmed at New York City's Yankee and Shea Stadiums during late May and June 1972, when the Yankees and Mets were on extended road trips. The tarpaulin-covered field and scoreboard of Robert F. Kennedy Stadium, where the American League's Washington Senators (1961–1971) played until moving to Texas, is also seen during the rain-delay scene.

The opening scene of the movie shows the stars running on the warning track at Yankee Stadium. In addition, the visitors' clubhouse, the walkway from the Yankees' dugout, as well as the front of the right field bullpen, were used in the "away game" sequences.

The "home" game sequences were filmed in Shea Stadium. The filmmakers also used the walkway that connected the Mets clubhouse, dugout, and the TV studio that was the home of Kiner's Korner postgame show for the singing scene. The Opening Day and band clips came from Major League Baseball; they were recorded before the fourth game of the 1969 World Series. Wide crowd shots are from a regular season game, and MLB films also provided clips of Tony Pérez (from the 1970 World Series) and Brooks Robinson hitting.

Spring-training baseball scenes were shot at the Philadelphia Phillies' complex in Clearwater, Florida, which is still in use. Rain-delay footage of a grounds crew covering the infield with a tarp was from the 1969 All-Star Game in Washington's RFK Stadium (the game was postponed by rain and played the next day). In the audio over this clip was the voice of longtime Yankees' public-address announcer Bob Sheppard.

The uniforms worn by the Mammoths baseball team are Yankees uniforms from 1971, but the "NY" on their pinstriped shirts was changed. Other teams providing uniforms were the Pittsburgh Pirates, Cleveland Indians, Cincinnati Reds and Boston Red Sox.

The film and book include a fictional card game known as "tegwar", an acronym for "the exciting game without any rules". It is a game designed to separate a sucker from their cash. Henry Wiggen plays this game against other ballplayers and coaches who are sucker passers-by in the lobby of the team hotel. It is generally believed that Bruce Pearson is too dumb to be able to sucker people, so he is initially excluded. However, Henry begins to include Bruce in the tegwar games as time goes on.

This film is reportedly Robert De Niro's colleague Al Pacino's favorite film. In reviews, Wiggen is often referred to as being modeled after Tom Seaver (although not in the book, which was written when Seaver was 12).

One piece of artistic license: Moriarity's Wiggen is a right-handed pitcher, while Wiggen in Harris's novels is explicitly a left-handed pitcher. In fact, the book written by Harris that features Wiggen and precedes Bang the Drum Slowly (1956) is titled The Southpaw (1953).

== Reception ==
Bang the Drum Slowly holds a rating of 90% on Rotten Tomatoes based on 40 reviews. The website's critics consensus reads, "Bang the Drum Slowly is a touching melodrama that explores the inner workings of a baseball club and its players' personalities with remarkable depth."

Roger Ebert of the Chicago Sun-Times gave the film his top grade of four stars, and wrote that "it's not so much a sports movie as a movie about those elusive subjects, male bonding and work in America. That the males play baseball and that sport is their work is what makes this the ultimate baseball movie; never before has a movie considered the game from the inside out."

Roger Greenspun of The New York Times wrote, "Except for some updating, and minimal plot simplification, John Hancock's 'Bang the Drum Slowly' is a remarkably faithful rendering of the well-known baseball novel that Mark Harris wrote in 1955. It is one of those rare instances in which close adaptation of a good book has resulted in possibly an even better movie."

Arthur D. Murphy of Variety said, "John Hancock's second feature directorial effort is very good in sustaining credible melodrama in the story of a dying baseball player and his pal. The film has nothing trendy going for it before the fact, either in the artistic or commercial sense, but it emerges as a touching, amusing and heart-warming picture."

Gene Siskel of the Chicago Tribune gave the film three stars out of four, and stated that it "does offer considerable entertainment, will provide at least a few sniffles, and does have a human center. The reason: The movie is very funny. Its best moments are not the maudlin, heart-tugging passages of dialog laced with mournful piano, but the locker-room antics of the baseball team itself."

Kevin Thomas of the Los Angeles Times called the film "deeply affecting, often humorous but never morbid or maudlin", and "a film studded with terrific scenes and telling bits of dialog, reminding us anew of how valuable the contribution of even the most unprepossessing individual can be".

Conversely, Gary Arnold of The Washington Post declared, "I found it a disappointing picture, flat and banal and not nearly as effective as the television movie 'Brian's Song,' with which 'Bang the Drum Slowly' is bound to be compared".

=== Awards and honors ===
For his portrayal of Dutch Schnell, Vincent Gardenia received an Academy Award for Best Supporting Actor nomination. Time Out magazine named it the 12th best baseball movie of all time.

== See also ==
- List of American films of 1973
- List of baseball films
