= Henry Wiggen =

Fictional baseball player

Henry Wiggen was a fictional baseball player who was the subject of four novels by Mark Harris: The Southpaw (1953), Bang the Drum Slowly (1956), A Ticket for a Seamstitch (1957), and It Looked Like For Ever (1979). Wiggen, who was born on July 4, 1931 in Perkinsville, New York, joined the fictitious "New York Mammoths" in 1952 as a pitcher. His teammates nicknamed him "Author", because he was always writing.

== Critical reception ==
The Columbia Daily Spectator has described Wiggen as having a "complex character", saying that he "epitomizes the American spirit of 'never say die,'" while Gerald Peary says that of all the fictional baseball players in American literature, Wiggen is the only one who "matters beyond the page" and "hangs on in the reader's thoughts, season after season;" he also notes Wiggen's propensity for malapropisms and poor grammar, comparing him to "Dizzy Dean with a typewriter".

== Media portrayals ==
Henry Wiggen has been portrayed on television by Paul Newman (in the 1956 United States Steel Hour adaptation of Bang the Drum Slowly), and on film by Michael Moriarty (in the 1973 film adaptation of the same novel).
