= Herman Hoffman =

Herman Hoffman may refer to:

- Herman H. Hoffman (1844–1931), American farmer and politician
- Herman S. Hoffman (1841–1912), American Reformed Episcopalian bishop

== See also ==
- Hermann Hoffmann
