= Mark Harris (author) =

American novelist (1922–2007)

- Born: Mark Harris Finkelstein; November 19, 1922; Mount Vernon, New York
- Died: May 30, 2007 (aged 84); Santa Barbara, California
- Education: University of Denver
- Occupation: Writer
- Known for: Bang the Drum Slowly
- Parent(s): Carlyle; Ruth (née Klausner)

Mark Harris (November 19, 1922 – May 30, 2007) was an American novelist, literary biographer, and educator, remembered for his baseball novels featuring the character Henry Wiggen, particularly Bang the Drum Slowly.

Born Mark Harris Finkelstein in Mount Vernon, New York. Harris began his early career as a journalist. After obtaining his doctorate in 1956, Harris became a college lecturer, teaching English primarily at the San Francisco State College and Arizona State University. Harris his first novel was Trumpet to the World (1946). Harris was best known for a quartet of novels about baseball players: The Southpaw (1953), Bang the Drum Slowly (1956), A Ticket for a Seamstitch (1957), and It Looked Like For Ever (1979). In 1956, Bang the Drum Slowly was adapted for an installment of the series The United States Steel Hour, starring Paul Newman. The novel also became a major motion picture in 1973, starring Robert De Niro. Although Bang the Drum Slowly was Harris's only true popular success, most of his novels received critical acclaim. These include Something about a Soldier (1957), Wake Up Stupid (1959), The Goy (1970), and Killing Everybody (1973).

In addition to his work as a novelist, Harris had a productive career in other literary genres. He authored numerous critical essays and articles, edited the poems of Vachel Lindsay and the journals of James Boswell, and wrote several biographies and three autobiographical books. Harris died in 2007. His obituary in The Denver Post called him "one of that legion of under-the-radar writers who for decades consistently turned out excellent novels and went largely unsung as he did...Harris said of his books that 'they are about the one man against his society and trying to come to terms with his society, and trying to succeed within it without losing his own identity or integrity.' He might have said the same thing of himself."

== Early life ==
Mark Harris Finkelstein was born in Mount Vernon, New York, to Carlyle and Ruth (Klausner) Finkelstein. At the age of 11, he began keeping a diary, which he would maintain every day for the rest of his life.

He dropped his surname after graduating in 1940 from Mount Vernon High School because "it was a difficult time for kids with Jewish names to get jobs." He went to work for Paul Winkler's Press Alliance news agency in New York City as a messenger and mimeograph operator.

In January 1943, he was drafted into the United States Army. His growing opposition to war and his anger at the prevalence of racial discrimination in the Army led him to go AWOL from Camp Wheeler, Georgia, in February 1944. He was soon arrested and then hospitalized for psychoneurosis. He was honorably discharged in April 1944. His wartime experience formed the basis for two of his novels, Trumpet to the World (1946) and Something About a Soldier (1957).

== Career ==
=== Journalism career ===
Harris joined The Daily Item of Port Chester, New York, as a reporter in May 1944. A year later he accepted a position with PM in New York City but was fired after two months.

In July 1945, he was hired by the International News Service and moved to St. Louis. While there, he met coworker Josephine Horen, whom he married in March 1946. After resigning in July 1946, he spent the next year and a half in a succession of short-lived journalism jobs in Albuquerque (Albuquerque Journal), Chicago (Negro Digest and Ebony), and New York (Park Row News Service).

=== Academic career ===
In February 1948, Harris enrolled at the University of Denver, from which he received a Master's degree in English in 1951 as well as obtaining a PhD in American Studies from the University of Minnesota in 1956, writing his doctoral dissertation on the progressive writer and intellectual Randolph Bourne.

After obtaining his doctorate, Harris began a long, productive career as a college educator. In September 1956, he was hired by the English department of San Francisco State College, where he taught until 1967.

He went on to teach at several other universities, including Purdue University (1967–1970), California Institute of the Arts (1970–1973), the University of Southern California (1973–1975), and the University of Pittsburgh (1976–1980).

In September 1980, he joined the faculty of Arizona State University, where he was a professor of English and taught in the creative writing program until his retirement in 2001.

=== Writing career ===
Harris completed his first novel, Trumpet to the World, while employed as a journalist in St. Louis. Published in 1946, Trumpet to the World is the story of a young black soldier married to a white woman who is put on trial for striking back at a white officer.

While Harris attended university, from 1948 to 1956, he continued to write fiction, producing three novels by the time he received his Ph.D. He continued to produce novels and contribute to periodicals through the years.

Harris was best known for a quartet of novels about baseball players: The Southpaw (1953), Bang the Drum Slowly (1956), A Ticket for a Seamstitch (1957), and It Looked Like For Ever (1979). Written in the American vernacular, the books are the account of Henry "Author" Wiggen, a pitcher for the fictional New York Mammoths.

In 1956, Bang the Drum Slowly was adapted for an installment of the dramatic television anthology series The United States Steel Hour; the production starred Paul Newman as Wiggen and Albert Salmi as doomed catcher Bruce Pearson. The novel also became a major motion picture in 1973, with a screenplay written by Harris, directed by John D. Hancock and featuring Michael Moriarty as Wiggen and Robert De Niro as Pearson.

Although Bang the Drum Slowly was Harris's only true popular success, most of his novels have received critical acclaim. These include Something about a Soldier (1957), Wake Up Stupid (1959), The Goy (1970), and Killing Everybody (1973).

In 1960, while in his first college teaching position at San Francisco State College, Harris promoted his then-most-recent book in a TV appearance as guest contestant in "You Bet Your Life", a game played on The Groucho Show.

In the first chapter of his 1961 book The Rhetoric of Fiction, Wayne C. Booth quotes the "fine young novelist" Harris as saying: "You will no more expect the novelist to tell you precisely how something is said than you will expect him to stand by your chair and hold your book."

In January 1962, Something About a Soldier, a stage version of Harris's novel, played briefly on Broadway. Written by Ernest Kinoy and produced by the Theatre Guild, it featured Sal Mineo in the lead role. Later, the novel Bang the Drum Slowly was adapted into a stage play at the Next Theatre in Evanston, Illinois.

In addition to his work as a novelist, Harris had a productive career in other literary genres. He authored numerous critical essays and articles, and has edited the poems of Vachel Lindsay (Selected Poems of Vachel Lindsay, 1963) and the journals of James Boswell (Heart of Boswell, 1981). Harris also wrote biographies of Lindsay (City of Discontent, 1952) and Saul Bellow (Saul Bellow: Drumlin Woodchuck, 1980). He has also written three autobiographical books: Mark the Glove Boy, or The Last Days of Richard Nixon (1964), an account of Nixon's unsuccessful California gubernatorial campaign; Twentyone Twice: A Journal (1966), an account of his experiences in Sierra Leone as a member of the Peace Corps; and, finally, Best Father Ever Invented (1976), subtitled "An Autobiography of Mark Harris," in which he chronicles his life from late adolescence up to 1973.

== Personal life and death ==
Harris died of complications of Alzheimer's disease at Santa Barbara Cottage Hospital at age 84.

He was survived by his wife, Josephine Horen; his sister, Martha; two sons, one daughter, and three grandchildren. His nephew (the son of Harris's sister Martha Finkelstein) is the writer Saïd Sayrafiezadeh, author of the memoir When Skateboards Will Be Free: A Memoir of a Political Childhood.

Harris's papers are held in Special Collections at the University of Delaware.

== Legacy ==
In Baseball: A Literary Anthology, editor Nicholas Dawidoff writes that "The four books in which Wiggen narrates the story of his life in baseball—The Southpaw (1953), Bang the Drum Slowly (1956), A Ticket for a Seamstitch (1957), and It Looked For Ever (1979)—elevate the baseball novel into unmistakable art."

In The Denver Post, Roger K. Miller writes that "Bang the Drum Slowly, by Henry J. Wiggin: Certain of His Enthusiasms Restrained, to give it its full title, is even better than that other much-praised baseball novel, Bernard Malamud's The Natural, with its element of fantasy. (Harris did not like fantasy, especially in baseball.) It is at least as good as Robert Coover's The Universal Baseball Association, Inc., J. Henry Waugh, Prop. which is about a fantasy game and, like Harris' and all other good baseball novels, about something more than baseball.""

== Selected works ==
=== Novels ===
- Trumpet to the World (1946)
- The Southpaw (1953)
- Bang the Drum Slowly (1956)
- Something about a Soldier (1957)
- A Ticket for a Seamstitch (1957)
- Wake Up, Stupid (1959)
- The Goy (1970)
- Killing Everybody (1973)
- It Looked Like Forever (1979)
- Lying in Bed (1984)
- Speed (1990)
- The Tale Maker (1994)

=== Short stories ===
- The Self-Made Brain Surgeon and Other Stories (1999)

=== Nonfiction ===
- City of Discontent: An Interpretive Biography of Vachel Lindsay (1952)
- Mark the Glove Boy, or The Last Days of Richard Nixon (1964)
- Twentyone Twice: A Journal (1966)
- Best Father Ever Invented: The Autobiography Of Mark Harris (1976)
- Short Work of It: Selected Writings (1979)
- Saul Bellow: Drumlin Woodchuck (1980)
- Diamond – The Baseball Writings of Mark Harris (collection, 1994)

=== Plays ===
- Friedman & Son (1963)
- Bang the Drum Slowly (1992)

=== Television plays ===
- Boswell for the Defence (1983)
- Boswell's London Journal (1984)

=== Screenplays ===
- Bang the Drum Slowly (1973)

=== As editor ===
- Selected Poems of Vachel Lindsay (1963)
- The Heart of Boswell: Six Journals in One Volume (1981)
