= Lord Arthur Savile's Crime =

Lord Arthur Savile's Crime may refer to:

- Lord Arthur Savile's Crime and Other Stories, an 1891 collection of short stories by Oscar Wilde
  - Lord Arthur Savile's Crime (short story)
- Lord Arthur Savile's Crime (1920 film), a Hungarian silent crime film, based on the short story
- Lord Arthur Savile's Crime (1922 film), a French silent mystery crime film, based on the short story
- Lord Arthur Savile's Crime (play), a 1952 play by Constance Cox, based on the short story
