= Elemér Baló =

Hungarian actor

- Born: 5 December 1892; Budapest, Austro-Hungarian Empire
- Died: 26 April 1970 (aged 77); Budapest, Hungary
- Occupation: Actor
- Years active: 1915–1961 (film)

Elemér Baló (1892–1970) was a Hungarian stage and film actor. On screen he mainly appeared in a supporting roles in a career that stretched back to the silent era. He appeared as a woodcutter in the 1942 film neorealist film People of the Mountains which screened at the Venice Film Festival. The same year he appeared in a more substantial role in Sirius, which was also shown at Venice.

== Selected filmography ==
- Lyon Lea (1915)
- Stars of Eger (1923)
- Judgment of Lake Balaton (1933)
- The Verdict of Lake Balaton (1933)
- The Ghost Train (1933)
- It Happened in March (1934)
- Miss President (1935)
- Dream Love (1935)
- It Was Me (1936)
- Anniversary (1936)
- Bence Uz (1938)
- Two Prisoners (1938)
- Six Weeks of Happiness (1939)
- The Five-Forty (1939)
- Gül Baba (1940)
- Let's Love Each Other (1941)
- Three Bells (1941)
- People of the Mountains (1942)
- Sirius (1942)
- Deadly Kiss (1942)
- Machita (1944)

== Bibliography ==
- Hames, Peter. The Cinema Of Central Europe. Wallflower Press, 2004. p. 248.
- Laura, Ernesto G. Tutti i film di Venezia, 1932–1984. La Biennale, Settore cinema e spettacolo televisivo, 1985.
- Székely, György & Gajdó, Tamás. Magyar színháztörténet: 1873-1920. Akadémiai Kiadó, 1990
