= State Street Sadie =

1928 film by Archie Mayo

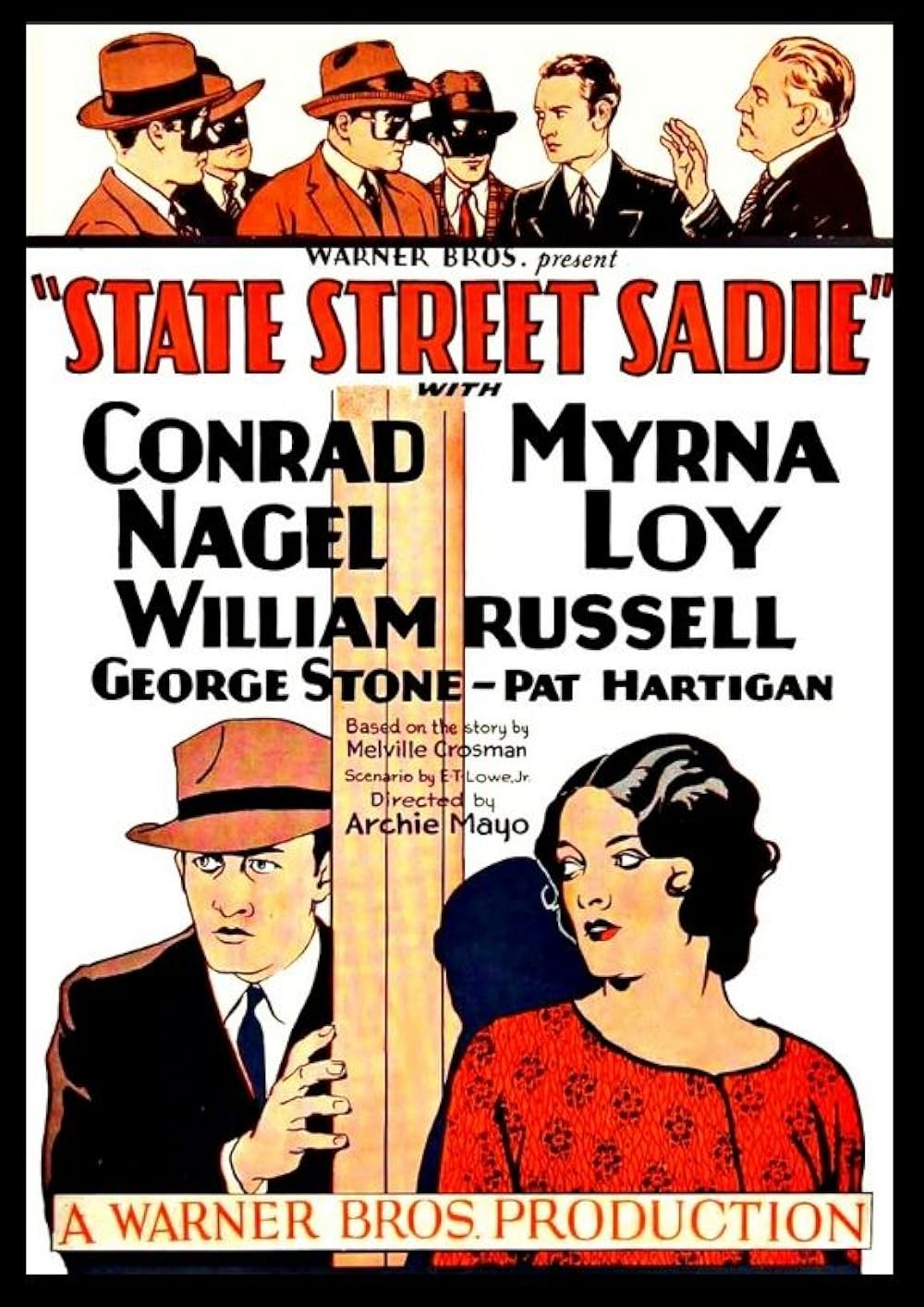
- Theatrical release poster
- Directed by: Archie Mayo
- Written by: Edward T. Lowe (adaptation, screenplay & titles); Joseph Jackson (titles)
- Story by: "Melville Crossman" (Darryl F. Zanuck)
- Starring: Conrad Nagel; Myrna Loy
- Cinematography: Barney McGill
- Edited by: George Marks
- Music by: Louis Silvers
- Production company: Warner Bros. Pictures
- Distributed by: Warner Bros. Pictures
- Release date: August 25, 1928
- Running time: 75 minutes
- Country: United States
- Languages: Sound (Part-Talkie); English Intertitles

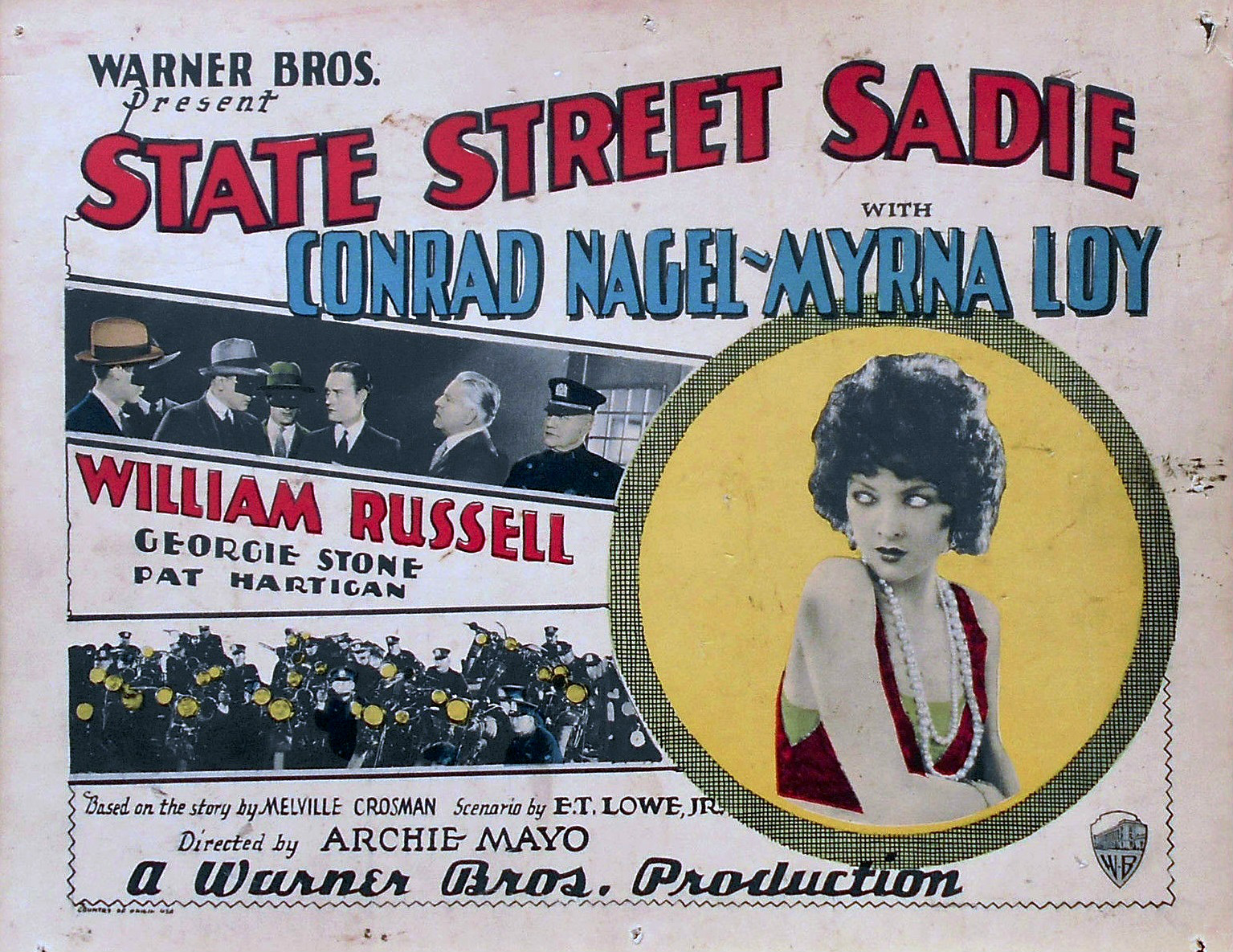
lobby card. lost film.

State Street Sadie is a 1928 American sound part-talkie crime drama film directed by Archie Mayo. In addition to sequences with audible dialogue or talking sequences, the film features a synchronized musical score and sound effects along with English intertitles. According to the film review in Variety, only about 10 minutes of the total running time featured dialogue. The soundtrack was recorded using the Vitaphone sound-on-disc system. This is regarded as a lost film. The plot of the film is suspiciously similar to that of The Girl from Chicago filmed the previous year and also seems to similar to the plot of the 1924 silent film Those Who Dance.

== Plot ==
Joe Blake, framed for the murder of a policeman, commits suicide. "The Bat", gang leader and the real murderer, is unaware of the suicide. To clear Joe's name, Ralph, his twin brother, takes his place in the gang. Another on the trail of the murderer is Isobel, daughter of the slain officer, who goes undercover in the criminal world as "State Street Sadie."

Ralph and Isobel, thrown together in the underworld, form a bond as they each seek justice. Posing as his brother, Ralph infiltrates the gang, earning the trust of Slinky and Bull Hawkins, all while searching for evidence that will reveal the truth. Isobel, posing as a streetwise moll, gains entry to the gang's social circle and dances at the notorious Racketeer's Ball.

Their secret investigation uncovers the inner workings of the crime trust and the methods used by the police to combat organized crime. Tensions mount as the net tightens around "The Bat," culminating in a nerve-wracking trap inside the gang leader's headquarters. Ralph and Isobel are captured, but Isobel escapes and calls in the police.

A dramatic machine-gun battle ensues as the police assault the hideout. In a final act of desperation, The Bat climbs to the rooftop but, cornered, leaps to his death rather than face capture.

== Cast ==
- Conrad Nagel as Ralph Blake
- Myrna Loy as Isobel
- William Russell as The Bat
- George E. Stone as Slinky
- Pat Hartigan as The Bull Hawkins
- Charles K. French

== See also ==
- List of early sound feature films (1926–1929)
