= Lonesome (1928 film) =

1928 film

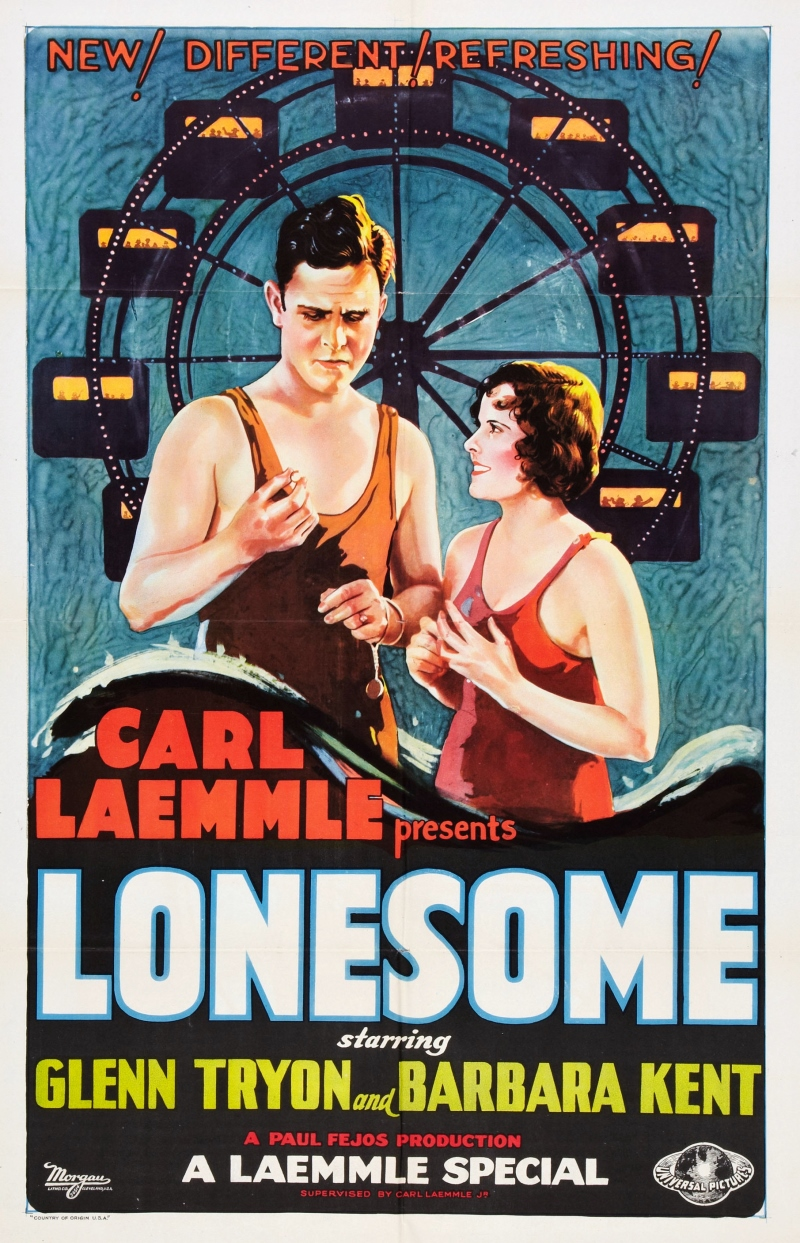
- Theatrical release poster
- Directed by: Paul Fejös
- Written by: Tom Reed; Edward T. Lowe Jr.
- Story by: Mann Page
- Produced by: Carl Laemmle; Carl Laemmle Jr. Oskar Schubert-Stevens
- Starring: Barbara Kent; Glenn Tryon; Fay Holderness
- Cinematography: Gilbert Warrenton
- Edited by: Frank Atkinson
- Distributed by: Universal Pictures
- Release dates: June 20, 1928 (Silent Version); September 30, 1928 (Sound Version)
- Running time: 69 minutes (Silent Version); 75 minutes (Sound Version)
- Country: United States
- Language: English

Lonesome is a 1928 American sound part-talkie comedy drama film directed by Paul Fejös, and starring Barbara Kent and Glenn Tryon. Although containing a few sequences with audible dialog, the majority of the film had a synchronized musical score with sound effects with English intertitles. The film was released in both sound-on-disc and sound-on-film formats. Its plot follows two working-class residents of New York City over a 24-hour-period, during which they have a chance meeting at Coney Island during the Independence Day weekend and swiftly fall in love with one another. It was produced and distributed by Universal Pictures.

In 2010, it was selected for preservation in the United States National Film Registry by the Library of Congress as being "culturally, historically, or aesthetically significant". The film was released on Blu-ray disc and DVD on August 28, 2012, as part of the Criterion Collection.

It was remade in 1935 as a comedy called The Affair of Susan.

== Plot ==
Lonesome (1928)

In New York City, Mary is a telephone operator who lives alone and is lonely. Jim is a factory worker who also lives alone and feels disconnected from the world. During the Independence Day weekend, both Mary and Jim decide to visit Coney Island alone after finishing their Saturday half-day work shifts. The two board the same bus, mutually catching the other's attention, and again encounter each other once they arrive at the beach.

After the two spend some time together on the beach, Mary realizes she has lost the wedding ring she wears. Jim helps her locate it, but is disheartened, believing she is married. Mary reassures him after they find the ring that it is only her mother's wedding band. As night falls, Mary laments the fact that their day together is over, but Jim assures her it is not, and they continue to spend time together at the amusement park, visiting a fortune teller and riding amusement park rides. The two ride a set of racing rollercoasters, but after a wheel on one of the trains catches fire, a melee ensues among the parkgoers, during which Mary and Jim are separated.

Only knowing each other's first name, and having only a small photo of each other, Jim and Mary are desperate to find each other. Jim attempts to locate Mary in the park, but a rainstorm causes further complications, sending the hundreds of park visitors scattering. A defeated Jim leaves Coney Island by train, as does Mary. Mary retreats to her apartment, where she begins to cry and beat her hands against the walls in despair. The noise catches the attention of Jim, who can hear it through the other wall—unbeknownst to either of them, the two are neighbors in their apartment building, but had never crossed paths prior. Jim opens the door to Mary's apartment and sees her standing before her bed. Shocked, but elated, the two embrace.

== Cast ==
- Barbara Kent as Mary
- Glenn Tryon as Jim
- Fay Holderness as Overdressed Woman
- Gustav Partos as Romantic Gentleman
- Eddie Phillips as The Sport
- Andy Devine as Jim's Friend
- Edgar Dearing as Cop (uncredited)
- Louise Emmons as Telephone Caller (uncredited)
- Fred Esmelton as Swami (uncredited)
- Jack Raymond as Barker (uncredited)
- Churchill Ross as Telephone Caller (uncredited)

== Music ==
The film featured a theme song entitled "Lonesome" with music by Joseph Cherniavsky and words by Dave Dreyer and Herman Ruby.

== Production ==
Lonesome, with a three-page outline, was originally intended, by the studio, to be a short, Fejös adapted the outline to feature length.

Lonesome has few intertitles.

The studio forced, and Fejos did not direct, three dialogue sequences, with primitive dialogue, and stationary camera, into the film for commercial attraction. Sound design features the repeated use of Irving Berlin's Always.

Lonesome was widely released in the sound version. The silent version was mainly seen in theatres that had not yet converted to sound (e.g., theatres in rural areas that could not afford the expense of converting to sound). Some scenes in existing original prints of the film are colored with stencils (purple). By the time it was ready for general release, Lonesome has been equipped with a synchronized soundtrack, with music, sound effects, and three dialogue scenes. The studio promoted the film as a sound film.

Cinematography includes: superimposition effects, experimental editing, roller-coasting camera, roving camera, fast motion, split screens, model work, matte paintings, hand-held shots and dolly shots.

== Reception ==
Jonathan Rosenbaum wrote: "...Paul Fejos's exquisite, poetic 1928 masterpiece about love and estrangement in the big city, deserves to be ranked with The Crowd as well as Sunrise, though it's not nearly as well-known as either".

In October 1928, Mordaunt Hall wrote that the film "...suggests an O Henry story without that author's keen insight into human nature. It is agreeable and interesting, a relief in many respects from the cut and dried picture formula so frequently set forth as a narrative. But there are a number of episodes where Dr. Fejos's imagination seems stunted".

Pat Kewley of PopMatters wrote: "...director Paul Fejös' rarely-seen 1928 film Lonesome, an audacious and visually spectacular urban love story from dawn of the talkie era, comes as close to the real deal as you're likely to find these days".

Cullen Gallagher of Not Coming to a Theater Near You wrote: "Lonesome is a working-class lullaby. In finding its plot in the day-to-day activities of everyday life, Lonesome reminds of a narrative version of Berlin: Symphony of a Great City, and also anticipates the docu-drama prototype People on Sunday that borrows significantly from Fejos' story".

== Re-release ==
"The original nitrate print was repatriated to the US (George Eastman House) in a trade that James Card made with Henri Langlois at the Cinémathèque Française".

In 2012, The Criterion Collection released Lonesome on DVD and Blu-ray, with Fejos' 1929 films Broadway and The Last Performance as extra features.

== See also ==
- List of early sound feature films (1926–1929)
