= Lord Arthur Savile's Crime (1920 film) =

1920 film

- Directed by: Pál Fejös
- Written by: Oscar Wilde (story); György Halász; Pál Fejös
- Starring: Ödön Bárdi; Lajos Gellért; Margit Lux; Gusztáv Pártos
- Music by: József Karbán
- Production company: Phõnix Film
- Release date: 31 July 1920
- Country: Hungary
- Languages: Silent; Hungarian intertitles

Lord Arthur Saville's Crime (Hungarian: Lidércnyomás) is a 1920 Hungarian silent crime film directed by Pál Fejös (Paul Fejos) and starring Ödön Bárdi, Lajos Gellért and Margit Lux. It was also released as both Mark of the Phantom and Lidercnyomas. The film was based on the 1891 short story Lord Arthur Savile's Crime by Oscar Wilde. It was one of Pal Fejos' earliest films and is now considered lost. It was filmed by Jozsef Karban.

In 1927, director Fejos emigrated to Hollywood, where he directed The Last Performance (1929); he later directed Fantômas in France in 1932.

The Oscar Wilde short story was filmed twice more in Europe during the silent years: in 1919 as Lord Saviles brott (a Swedish film directed by Gunnar Klintberg) and again in 1921 as Lord Arthur Savile's Crime (a French film directed by René Hervil).

== Plot ==
After being told by a fortune teller named Septimus R. Podgers that he is destined to be a murderer, an aristocrat named Lord Arthur Saville decides to commit a murder before his impending marriage, so his marriage will not be sullied. He slips his old aunt a poison pill, and she dies, leaving him a huge inheritance. When his fiancé Sybil later finds the poison pill among his deceased aunt's belongings, he realizes he did not murder her after all. After a few more failed attempts to kill someone, he returns to the fortune teller and winds up pushing her into the Thames, where she drowns. He gets away with killing her though, as the police rule her death a suicide. Free at last, he marries Sybil, but learns many years later that the fortune teller he killed had been a total fraud with no powers of prediction whatsoever.

== Cast ==
- Ödön Bárdi - Arthur Fayerle
- Lajos Gellért - Blecher
- Margit Lux
- Gusztáv Pártos
