= The Last Moment =

The Last Moment may refer to:

- The Last Moment (1928 film), an American drama film
- The Last Moment (1923 film), an American silent horror film
