= Paul Fejos =

Hungarian-American filmmaker and anthropologist

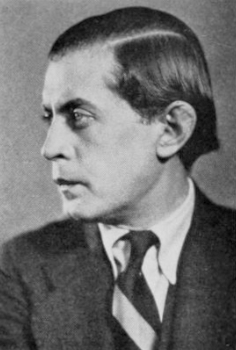
- Born: Pál Fejős; 24 January 1897; Budapest, Austria-Hungary
- Died: 23 April 1963 (aged 66); New York City, U.S.
- Occupations: Film director, anthropologist, screenwriter, medical orderly, researcher
- Years active: 1919–1963
- Spouses: Mara Jankowsky (m. 1914; div. 1921) Mimosa Pfalz (m. 1925; div. 1925) Inga Arvad (m. 1936; div. 1942) Lita Binns (m. 1958)

Pál Fejős (24 January 1897 – 23 April 1963), known professionally as Paul Fejos, was a Hungarian-American director of feature films and documentaries who worked in a number of countries including the United States. He also studied medicine in his youth and became a prominent anthropologist later in life. During World War I, Fejos worked as a medical orderly for the Imperial Austrian Army on the Italian front lines and also managed a theater that performed for troops. After the war, he returned to Budapest and eventually worked for the Orient-Film production company. He began to direct films in 1919 or 1920 for Mobil Studios in Hungary until he escaped in 1923 to flee the White Terror and the Horthy regime. He made his way to New York City and then eventually to Hollywood where he began production on his first American feature film, The Last Moment, in October 1927. The film proved to be popular, which allowed him to sign with Universal Studios. After a number of other successful films, Fejos left America in 1931 to direct sound films in France. In 1941, he stopped making films altogether and became the director of research and the acting head of the Viking Fund.

== Early life ==
Fejos was born in Budapest, Hungary, as Pál Fejős to Dezső (Desiré) Fejős and his wife Hajnalka (Latinized Aurora, née Novelly). He had an older sister, Olga Fejős. Like many film directors, Fejos exaggerated or invented myths for large portions of his life story and, according to him, his father was a captain with the Hussars and his mother was a Lady-in-waiting for the Austrian-Hungarian Empress. In addition, Fejos fancied himself in his youth as an official of the Imperial Court. The truth is the family of Fejos' mother originated in Italy, but did have an aristocratic background, while Fejos' father was a pharmacist in Dunaföldvár. Shortly before Fejos was born, his father sold his business and moved the family to Budapest to buy a shop there. Desiré died of a heart attack before the new shop was purchased. Paul was then raised by his mother in his grandparents' home. As a boy, Fejos was said to be a smart student and to have loved films from an early age. He was sent to a school run by Piarist Fathers in Veszprém and later to a school in Kecskemét. He eventually studied medicine and, in 1921, received an M.D. from the Royal Hungarian Medical University of Budapest. In 1914, Fejos married Mara Jankowsky. World War I started soon afterward and Fejos worked as a medical orderly for the Imperial Austrian Army on the Italian front lines. During the war he also managed a theater that performed for the troops. Some additional myths about Fejos' life surfaced a year later that he was an officer in the Hussars, was wounded three times and that he was the first person to pilot a combat airplane. After the war, Fejos returned to Budapest. He began working as a set painter for an opera company and then eventually for the Orient-Film production company. He and Mara divorced in 1921, due allegedly to Fejos' irrational jealousy.

== Early film career ==
Fejos began directing films in either 1919 or 1920 for Mobil Studios in Hungary. His earliest silent films included Pán, a fantasy based on the mythological character; Lord Arthur Savile's Crime, based on a play by Oscar Wilde; The Black Captain, a film about police corruption in New York City; The Last of Arsène Lupin, a remake of the popular American serial film; and The Queen of Spades, based on the novel by Alexander Pushkin. Fejos always saw film as closer to painting than to theater and was more concerned about issues of light and shadow than story. He also stated at the time that no great film would be made until it could be shot in color.

As did prominent Hungarian filmmakers Michael Curtiz and Alexander Korda, Fejos left Hungary in 1923 to escape the White Terror and the Horthy regime. Fejos first traveled to Vienna, where Max Reinhardt briefly employed him. Fejos then headed to Berlin and worked as an extra in Fritz Lang's Die Nibelungen. Fejos then moved to Paris and staged an unsuccessful production of L'Homme, the avant-garde play of Walter Hasenclever. In October 1923, Fejos emigrated to the United States. He arrived in New York City penniless and speaking little English, but managed to get several low-paying jobs at funeral parlors and piano factories. His English improved and, by the spring of 1924, Fejos got a job as a laboratory technician at the Rockefeller Institute for Medical Research. He earned $80 a week and was employed there for two years. In 1925, he married a co-worker, Mimosa Pfalz, but the marriage lasted just thirty days. While living in New York, Fejos landed one theater gig as a technical adviser ensuring the Hungarian atmosphere of an adaptation of Ferenc Molnár's The Glass Slipper. In the spring of 1926, Fejos spent his entire life savings of $45 on an old Buick to move to Los Angeles and pursue a Hollywood film career.

== Hollywood career ==
When he arrived in Hollywood, Fejos struggled financially. He landed a few odd jobs working on scripts. Sometimes he would survive by hitchhiking to Pasadena and stealing oranges from orchards. On one of his hitchhiking trips, Fejos was picked up by Edward Spitz, a rich, young New Yorker who had recently moved to Hollywood with ambitions to produce films. Fejos told Spitz about his movie career in Hungary and convinced Spitz to finance a feature film. Spitz agreed and gave Fejos $5,000, which was approximately 1 percent of the average film budget at that time. In October 1927, Fejos began production on his first American feature. He convinced actor friends to appear in the film for free, promising compensation if the movie were successful. That included Georgia Hale, Charlie Chaplin's frequent co-star, when she was earning $5,000 a week. Fejos rented studio space by the minute instead of by the day and hired Leon Shamroy, an inexperienced cameraman. Fejos utilized sets from other movies and changed the script when necessary for the settings. When actors or sets were unavailable, Fejos filmed close-ups of hands, feet, cars or anything else that stuck him as interesting. He obtained free film stock from the DuPont company, which was trying to compete with the more established Kodak and Agfa companies.

The finished project, The Last Moment, took 28 days to shoot. It starred Otto Matieson as a man committing suicide by drowning who remembers in flashbacks the events of his life leading up to his death. The seven-reel, silent movie contained no title cards. It is currently a lost film, but a review described it as having "dizzying wipes, multiple superimpositions and vertiginous camera movements." Released in 1928, The Last Moment received rave reviews and was a financial hit. Charlie Chaplin praised it and writer Tamar Lane called it "one of the most remarkable films that has ever been presented on the screen." With the film's success and Fejos' overnight celebrity status, major studios were suddenly competing for the former vagrant to sign contracts with them. He settled with Universal Studios because its contract offered him complete artistic control.

In 1928, Fejos quickly began production on his next and best-known film, Lonesome, from a script by Edward T. Lowe Jr. and Tom Reed based on a newspaper article about loneliness in modern American cities. Carl Laemmle Jr. produced the film. Actors Glenn Tryon and Barbara Kent play two lonely New Yorkers who live in adjoining apartments unbeknownst to each other. They meet by chance at Coney Island and begin a romance, but lose each other until finally reunited back at their building. The film was hand-tinted and stencil-colored at many points, making it already visually distinctive. After Lonesome went into general release as a silent film in mid-June 1928, Universal borrowed a Movietone News recording truck from Fox Film. On the pretext of making sound tests (their own sound stages would not be ready until late October), Universal hurriedly recorded "talkie" scenes for the film and synchronized music-and-effects scores by recently hired musical director Joseph Cherniavsky. Lonesome was the first of three already completed movies to which Universal added sound, with no input from Fejos on the dialogue sequences. This new version of the film was released on September 20, 1928. (After this first hastily accomplished phase, Universal continued using Fox's equipment to make its own first all-talking movie, Melody of Love - which is also the first-ever film musical - in under two week. That led a chagrined and angry crew from Fox to repossess its sound truck from Universal.) Lonesome was another box office hit for Fejos and the film's reputation has grown throughout the years. French cineaste Georges Sadoul called it a precursor to neorealism. Film critic Jonathan Rosenbaum praised Lonesome and compared Fejos to F. W. Murnau, Fritz Lang, Sergei Eisenstein and Vsevolod Pudovkin. Andrew Sarris called Lonesome it "a tender love story in its silent passages...[but] crude, clumsy and tediously tongue-tied in its talkie passages." Charles Higham stated that although "its visual style, initially attractive, becomes a monotonous succession of busy shots, dissolving over each other in a perpetual flurry...[but] the films charm is real."

Fejos's third Hollywood film, The Last Performance, was another box office success in 1929 for Universal Studios. Part sound and part silent, the film starred Conrad Veidt as a stage magician who falls in love with his assistant. Later that year, Fejos began production on his largest and most ambitious film, Broadway, based on the hit stage production produced by Jed Harris, George Abbott and Phillip Dunning. Fejos was given a $1 million budget, most of which was spent on the huge cubist nightclub set and a 28-ton camera crane that was the largest and most versatile one built by that time. The film starred Glenn Tryon and Evelyn Brent. The movie was only a modest success, however, and Fejos considered it a failure. (William A. Seiter made a new version of Broadway in 1942.) Film critic Miles Krueger said "the images of the Paradise Club and the huge musical number (Final in Technicolor)" from Fejos' movie "have become basic screen literature."

In 1930, Fejos became an American citizen and began filming the musical Captain of the Guard (AKA Marsellaise). During the shooting of an ambitious sequence using more than 300 extras to depict the storming of the Bastille, Fejos fell from a high scaffolding and suffered a concussion. He spent six weeks in bed recovering. John S. Robertson finish the movie, and Fejos received no screen credit.

He then worked on King of Jazz, on which John Murray Anderson received the official directing credit. This angered Fejos and continued when Universal did not let him direct All Quiet on the Western Front. Fejos broke his contract with Universal and signed with Metro Goldwyn Mayer shortly afterwards. That only led to Fejos directing the German and French language versions of The Big House.

== European career ==
In 1931, Fejos left Hollywood, accepting an invitation from Pierre Braunberger to direct early sound films in France. Fejos complained to a reporter that Hollywood was too commercial and like a drug for the public. The Hollywood-fantasy happy endings simply blinded working people from their hopeless lives, he said. "(I)f the movie theaters were suddenly closed in America, there would be a revolution", Fejos added, but that, in Europe, he hoped for "films made in the name of art". His career in France was short-lived, beginning with his supervision in 1931 of Claude Heymann's American Love. Fejos then made the ambitious Fantômas, a remake of the famous serial made by Louis Feuillade in the 1910s.

In 1932, Fejos returned to Hungary to direct Spring Shower (Tavaszi Zápor), which some film critics have called his best movie. It stars Annabella as a young girl, Marie, who is seduced and abandoned with a child. She dies in poverty only to find herself having to scrub floors in Heaven. By dumping her wash bucket, she creates a rain storm that prevents her growing daughter from repeating Marie's mistakes.

Jonathan Rosenbaum praised the film. Much as Lonesome seems indebted to the city and amusement park scenes in Sunrise, Spring Shower also has nocturnal lighting and sensuality in Marie's seduction, as well as a mysterious musical aftermath, reminiscent of certain rustic night scenes in Sunrise. Unlike the determinism of Murnau's compositions and camera movements, though, Fejos' anthropological distance and fairy-tale encapsulations imply a different sort of relationship to his characters. The rapid cutting between details in a brothel, conveying Marie's confusion before fainting, encourages an identification with sensations, not thoughts or feelings. The beauty of Annabella's performance and a violin-and-clarinet theme also help one overlook some of the more reductive aspects of the folk legend that define the films dimensions.

Having fallen in love with Annabella, Fejos allegedly flew in a small plane over her train back to France and showered it with roses. Fejos's friend John W. Dodds has stated that "every time [Fejos] moved to another country, it was because of an ending love affair." Fejos spent the next few years throughout different European countries, often with his frequent collaborators Lothar Wolff, his assistant director, and Ferenc Farkas, his composer. The Verdict of Lake Balaton (Itél a Balaton) in 1932 was Fejos' second Hungarian film. It includes beautiful documentary-like footage of local fishermen and their everyday lives. The movie was highly criticized in Hungary, however, for its depiction of the fisherman and accused of bigotry against village life.

In 1933, Fejos moved to Austria and made Ray of Sunshine (Sonnenstrahl), again starring Annabella. The film focused on unemployment and poverty in post-World War I Austria and was praised by critics as "the summit of Fejos' art in Europe...too often ignored by the critics." Later that year, Fejos made the light comedy Voices of Spring (Frühlingstimmen).

In 1934, Fejos moved to Denmark and made three films for the Nordisk Film company: Flight of the millions (Flugten fra millionerne), a light comedy in 1934; Prisoner Number 1 (Fange Nr. 1), a farce in 1935 about a world where there are no prisoners or police officers; and The Golden Smile (Det Gyldne Smil), an adaptation in 1935 of playwright Kaj Munk's story about the relationship between art and life.

== Career as ethnographic filmmaker ==
By 1935, Fejos had grown tired of narrative movies and their inauthentic sets and stories. Nordisk Film sent him to scout filming locations in Madagascar. Fejos loved the country so much that he stayed for nine months. He filmed over 30,000 feet of footage of animals, plants, tribal societies and local customs, all of which was unusable for a theatrical feature. He also collected many artifacts and eventually donated them to the Royal Danish Geographical Society. Upon Fejos' return to Denmark, Svensk Filmindustri's Gunnar Skoglund saw the Madagascar footage and commissioned a series of six short documentaries released between 1935 and 1936. These films included Black Horizons (Svarta Horisonter), The Dancers of Esira, Beauty Salon in the Jungle, The Most Useful Tree in the World, Sea Devil and The Graves of our Father. In 1936, Fejos married Inga Arvad, a Danish journalist noted both for being a guest of Adolf Hitler at the 1936 Summer Olympics and for a romantic relationship with John F. Kennedy. Arvad appeared in Flight of the millions, and the two remained married until 1942.

Inspired by his newfound passion for cultures and history, Fejos studied cultural anthropology in 1936 at the Museum of Copenhagen under Dr. Thompson. Svensk Filmindustri then commissioned Fejos to make a series of ethnographic films from 1937 to 1938 in such countries as Indonesia, the Philippines, New Guinea, Ceylon and Thailand. These movies included A Handful of Rice (En Handfull Ris), Man and Woman (Man och Kvinna), The Tribe Still Lives (Stammen lever än), The Bamboo Age of Mentawei (Bambuåldern på Mentawei), The Chief's Son is Dead (Hövdingens son är död), The Komodo Dragon (Draken på Komodo) and The Village Near Pleasant Fountain (Byn vid den trivsamma brunnen).

Returning in 1938 from filming in Thailand, Fejos met Swedish industrialist Axel Wenner-Gren. They became fast friends and Wenner-Gren changed Fejos' life much as Edward Spitz had a decade earlier. Wenner-Gren agreed to finance in late 1939 an expedition by Fejos to Peru. In Cusco there, a Franciscan friar told Fejos about a legendary lost city somewhere in the jungle. Fejos immediately contacted Wenner-Gren, who agreed to give additional financing for the expedition. The filmmaker discovered 18 ancient Incan cities and traveled to the headwaters of the Amazon River. Fejos spent a year in Peru studying the culture and filming the Yagua tribe. The research resulted in Fejos' final series of films, Yagua, released in 1940 and 1941. It also led to the publication in 1943 of Ethnology of the Yagua by the Viking Fund Series of Publications in Anthropology.

== Career as anthropologist and final years ==
In 1941, Fejos stopped traveling and making films to become both the director of research and acting head of the Viking Fund, a non-profit foundation based in New York City that Wenner-Gren created that year (and later renamed the Wenner-Gren Foundation for Anthropological Research). Fejos became highly respected in his field and was considered ahead of his time for calling for communication amongst various branches of anthropology. Fejos taught during this time at Stanford, Yale and Columbia universities.

In 1958, Fejos married anthropologist Lita Binns. She succeeded him as the Wenner-Gren Foundation research director after he died on 23 April 1963. "Fejos had the temperament of an artist rather than a scholar or research scientist," David Bidney wrote in an obituary. Fejos "supported not only research projects(,) but also, and primarily. individuals whom he trusted and considered worthy of support...His personal support of Pierre Teilhard de Chardin during the last years of the life of this eccentric genius is but one outstanding example...(Fejos) leaves behind him the Wenner-Gren Foundation for Anthropological Research which he built, an international host of friends whom he helped, and a wife whom he cherished and appreciated."

== Selected filmography ==
- Lord Arthur Savile's Crime (1920)
- Stars of Eger (1923)
- The Last Moment (1928, lost film)
- Lonesome (1928)
- Broadway (1929)
- The Last Performance (1929)
- The Big House (1930, German and French versions)
- Captain of the Guard (1930 Uncredited )
- Men Behind Bars (1931)
- American Love (1931)
- Fantômas (1932)
- Spring Shower (1932)
- The Verdict of Lake Balaton (1932)
- Voices of Spring (1933)
- Flight from the Millions (1934)
- The Golden Smile (1935)
- Prisoner Number One (1935)
- Svarta horisonter (1936, series of 6 short documentaries)
- Stammen lever än (1937
- Bambuåldern på Mantaivei (1937)
- Hövdingens son är död (1937)
- Draken på Komodo (1937)
- Byn vid den trivsamma brunnen (1937)
- Tambora (1938)
- Att segla är nödvändigt (1938)
- En handfull ris (1938)
- Man och kvinna (1939)
- Yagua (1941)

== See also ==
- Runkuraqay
