= Adele Kern =

German opera singer

Adele Kern (née Adele Kern-Klein; 25 November 1901 – 6 May 1980) was a German operatic and operetta coloratura soprano. She was known for her technical perfection and joy of playing. From 1927 to 1935, she sang at the Salzburg Festival as well as at the state operas of Vienna, Berlin and Munich.

She was one of the impressive ranks of Austrian and German soprani leggeri who made international careers in the 1920s and 1930s, including Irma Beilke, Erna Berger, Irene Eisinger, Ria Ginster, Maria Ivogün, Fritzi Jokl and Lotte Schöne.

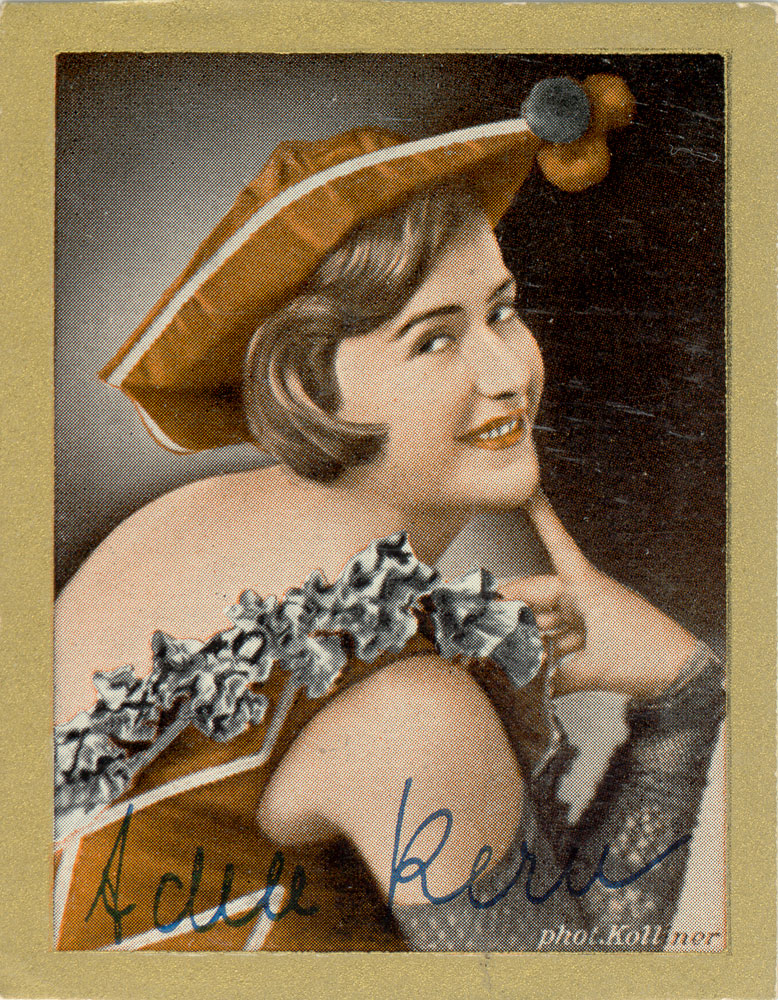
Adele Kern, c. 1933

== Life ==
Adele Kern was born in Munich on Nov 25, 1901. She studied with the famous coloratura soprano Hermine Bosetti (1875–1936). The pupil followed the path and roles of her teacher - both at the opera houses of Munich and Vienna and as Ännchen and Zerbinetta.

She made her debut as early as 1924 at the Bavarian State Opera in Munich as Olympia in The Tales of Hoffmann. There are different indications about the duration of her engagement in Munich. She was the first coloratura soprano to move to the Städtische Opernhaus in Frankfurt, where she had a contract until 1928. There, the ambitious conductor Clemens Krauss was artistic director from 1924 to 1929, and Lothar Wallerstein acted as principal conductor. The two created a new, production-oriented musical theatre in Frankfurt and took care of the musical and dramatic development of the young singer. Kern was to be regarded as a Clemens Krauss singer for many years (and she later worked at the state operas of Vienna, Berlin and Munich during his time as director). In Frankfurt she was already able to acquire numerous roles of her later very extensive role repertoire. In February 1926 she was also involved in the premiere of an opera by Bernhard Sekles.

In 1927, she undertook a major South American tour. as well as in ten performances of Marcelline in Fidelio, embodied 38 times Adele in Die Fledermaus, sang - besides Zerbinetta - 5 times Fiakermilli, 6 times one of the maids in Elektra and 40 times Sophie in Der Rosenkavalier.

From 1928, she had her greatest success in Vienna as the maid Yvonne in 19 performances of Krenek's so-called jazz opera Jonny spielt auf, which was later banned by Nazi Germany as degenerate music, and in 1930 as Angelina in Rossini's La Cenerentola with Koloman von Pataky as her partner. She sang this role 25 times in Vienna. However, she also distinguished herself as a Verdi singer - 18 times Gilda, 16 times Oscar - and in the late romantic-veristic subject - 17 times Lucieta in Ermanno Wolf-Ferrari's I quatro rusteghi and 19 times Nuri in d'Albert's Tiefland. She could also be seen and heard in the State Opera in operettas by Heuberger, Lehár and Millöcker.

Kern sang in Vienna in three premieres: 1930 in Das Veilchen vom Montmartre by Emmerich Kálmán at the Johann Strauss Theater in 1930 in Endlich allein by Franz Lehár at the Theater an der Wien and 1934 in Fanny in Bittner's Das Veilchen at the Vienna State Opera. This performance was conducted by Clemens Krauss, who had taken over the direction of the Staatsoper in 1929, and staged by Lothar Wallerstein, who had accompanied Krauss from Frankfurt to Vienna. However, Wallerstein had to emigrate in 1938 due to Nazi racial laws and finally continued his career at the New York Metropolitan Opera.

=== Salzburg Festival ===
On 6 August 1927 her debut at the Salzburg Festival followed, under the musical direction of Robert Heger, as Susanna in The Marriage of Figaro. Furthermore she took over the roles of Marzelline and Zerlina in the reprises of Fidelio and Don Giovanni.

In 1929 she returned to Salzburg - as Zerlina and Sophie - and was then engaged by the Salzburg Festival until 1935. Don Giovanni was conducted by the outgoing Vienna State Opera Director Franz Schalk, the Rosenkavalier his successor and her mentor from Frankfurt, Clemens Krauss. In the following years Kern again sang Zerlina (1930), Susanna and Sophie (both 1930-35) in Salzburg, as well as Despina in Così fan tutte for the first time (1931 to 1934|1931-32 and 1934-35). She also appeared there as a concert singer.

Parallel to her engagements in Vienna and Salzburg, she developed a lively guest performance activity. In 1929 and 1931 she took part in two exemplary Max Reinhardt productions in Berlin: as Adele in the Fledermaus (at the Deutsches Theater) and as Olympia in The Tales of Hoffmann (at the Großes Schauspielhaus). In 1931 and 1933 she was a guest at the Royal Opera House Covent Garden in London, where her Sophie was especially admired in the Rosenkavalier. In 1933 she took over the role of Hannerl Krüger in Voices of Spring, a feature film by Pál Fejös. At the Berlin Theater des Westens in December of the same year she took part in the premiere of Eduard Künneke's Singspiel Die lockende Flamme. She gave guest performances at the Milan Scala and at the Teatro dell'Opera di Roma, in Paris, Venice and Rio de Janeiro. She also undertook a successful tour of Egypt.

=== Berlin and Munich ===
Like Julius Patzak and Viorica Ursuleac, Kern followed the conductor and director Clemens Krauss first to the Staatsoper Unter den Linden in Berlin in 1935 and then to the Bayerische Staatsoper in Munich in 1937. There, in her hometown, the artist achieved extraordinary popularity due to her razor-sharp coloratura, the silvery tone of her voice and the unusual brilliance of her performance. In Munich, Kern also sang her signature roles in operas by Mozart and Richard Strauss, including Sophie and Zerbinetta.

The singer's involvement in NS cultural policy is not known. In July 1944, however, she gave a guest performance as Zerbinetta in Krakow in a new production of Ariadne auf Naxos ordered by Governor General Hans Frank.

== Death ==
At the age of 46, she retired due to a heart condition. She died in 1980, aged 78, and was buried at Ostfriedhof in Munich.

== Roles ==
=== World premieres ===
- 1926: Die zehn Küsse by Bernhard Sekles – Oper Frankfurt (25 February)
- 1930: Das Veilchen von Montmartre by Emmerich Kálmán – Johann Strauß-Theater, Vienna (21 March)
- 1931: Endlich allein by Franz Lehár – Theater an der Wien (6 December)
- 1933: Die lockende Flamme by Eduard Künneke – Theater des Westens (27 December)
- 1934: Fanny in Bittner's Das Veilchen – Wiener Staatsoper, conductor: Clemens Krauss (8 December)

=== Repertoire ===
Beethoven:

- Marcelline im Fidelio

Brüll:

- Therese in Das goldene Kreuz

d’Albert:

- Nuri in Tiefland

Donizetti:

- Norina in Don Pasquale

Heuberger:

- Henri in Der Opernball

Humperdinck:

- Gretel in Hänsel und Gretel
- Gänsemagd in Königskinder

Krenek:

- Yvonne in Jonny spielt auf

Lehár:

- Mi in Das Land des Lächelns

Lortzing:

- Marie in Der Waffenschmied
- Baronin Freimann in Der Wildschütz by Meyerbeer
- Urbain in Die Hugenotten by Millöcker
- Bronislawa in Der Bettelstudent

Mozart:

- Blondchen in Die Entführung aus dem Serail
- Susanna in Le nozze di Figaro
- Zerlina in Don Giovanni
- Despina in Così fan tutte
- Papagena in The Magic Flute

Offenbach:

- Olympia The Tales of Hoffmann

Pergolesi:

- Serpina in La serva padrona

Pfitzner:

- Ighino in Palestrina

Puccini

- Musetta in La Bohème

Rimski-Korsakov:

- Die Königin von Schemacha in The Golden Cockerel

Rossini:

- Rosina in Il barbiere di Siviglia
- Angelina in La Cenerentola

Johann Strauß:

- Adele in Die Fledermaus

Richard Strauss:

- Sophie in Der Rosenkavalier
- Zerbinetta in Ariadne auf Naxos
- Fiakermilli in Arabella

Thomas:

- Philine in Mignon

Verdi:

- Gilda in Rigoletto
- Oscar in Un ballo in maschera
- Nanetta in Falstaff

Wagner:

- Stimme des Waldvogels in Siegfried
- Klingsors Zaubermädchen in Parsifal

Weber

- Ännchen in Der Freischütz

Wolf-Ferrari:

- Lucieta in I quatro rusteghi

Sources for the roles of her repertoire:

== Filmography ==
- 1934: Voices of Spring by Pál Fejös – as Hannerl Krüger

== Recording ==
Recordings on Parlophon, Polydor and Vox. Numerous recordings of opera scenes from the Vienna State Opera were issued on Koch Records.

Complete recordings

- Johann Strauß': Die Fledermaus (1929), conductor: Weigert – Role: Adele R. Strauss: Der Rosenkavalier conductor: Clemens Krauss (1940 or 1944, Vox) – Sophie

Arias

- Durch Zärtlichkeit und Schmeicheln from Mozart's: Die Entführung aus dem Serail – Blondchen
- Laßt ab mit Fragen from Verdi's Un ballo in maschera – Oscar

Lieder

- Die Nachtigall by Aljabjew – auf Schellack
- Der Vogel im Walde by Taubert – auf Schellack

Sampler

- Lebendige Vergangenheit: Adele Kern, Classica Lirica Recital, Preiser Records (PRE 89586)
