= The Charlatan (1929 film) =

1929 film

- Directed by: George Melford
- Screenplay by: J. G. Hawks
- Adaptation by: Robert N. Lee
- Dialogue by: Jack Rollens Tom Reed
- Titles by: Tom Reed
- Based on: The Charlatan; 1923 play by Ernest Pascal and Leonard Praskins
- Produced by: Carl Laemmle, Jr.
- Starring: Holmes Herbert; Margaret Livingston; Rockliffe Fellowes
- Cinematography: George Robinson
- Edited by: Robert Jahns; Maurice Pivar
- Production company: Universal Pictures
- Distributed by: Universal Pictures
- Release date: April 7, 1929
- Country: United States
- Languages: Sound (Part-Talkie); English Intertitles

The Charlatan is a 1929 sound part-talkie crime thriller film directed by George Melford for Universal Pictures. In addition to sequences with audible dialogue or talking sequences, the film features a synchronized musical score and sound effects along with English intertitles. The soundtrack was recorded using the Western Electric sound-on-film system. The film starred Holmes E. Herbert, Margaret Livingston and Rockliffe Fellowes. The film is based on the 1923 play The Charlatan by Leonard Praskins and Ernest Pascal.

== Plot ==
A wealthy socialite invites a carnival sideshow performer named Count Merlin to entertain her guests at a party. As the night goes on, a murder occurs and a dark secret from Merlin's past is revealed.

== Cast ==
- Holmes Herbert - as Count Merlin (aka Peter Dwight)
- Margaret Livingston - as Florence
- Rockliffe Fellowes - as Richard Talbot
- Philo McCullough - as Dr. Paynter
- Anita Garvin - as Mrs. Paynter
- Crauford Kent - as Frank Deering
- Frank Mackaye - as Jerry Starke
- Dorothy Gould - as Ann Talbot
- Rose Tapley - as Mrs. Deering

== Production ==
The film was based on the play The Charlatan by Ernest Pascal and Leonard Praskins. The play was adapted by Robert N. Lee with dialogue by Jack Rollens and Tom Reed and intertitled by Reed. Universal designed the film as one of their Jewel Productions for 1929.

== Release ==
The Charlatan was released on April 14, 1929, as a part talkie featuring thirty percent of its running time with audible dialogue or talking sequences. The film had a 60-minute running time with a review in Variety stating that about 15 minutes of the film contained dialogue.

== See also ==
- List of early sound feature films (1926–1929)
