= Judgment of Lake Balaton =

1933 film

- Directed by: Werner Hochbaum
- Written by: István Mihály
- Produced by: Imre Nádossy
- Starring: Gyula Csortos; Maria Mindzenty; Antal Páger
- Cinematography: István Eiben; J. Peverell Marley
- Edited by: Lothar Wolff
- Music by: Ferenc Farkas; Viktor Vaszy
- Production company: Hunnia Film Studio
- Distributed by: Karola Czerny Filmverleih
- Release date: March 1933
- Running time: 58 minutes
- Countries: Austria; Hungary
- Language: German

Judgment of Lake Balaton or Balaton Condemned (German title: Menschen im Sturm) is a 1933 Austrian-Hungarian drama film directed by Werner Hochbaum and starring Gyula Csortos, Maria Mindzenty and Antal Páger.

It is now a lost film. A separate Hungarian-language version The Verdict of Lake Balaton was also made, directed by Paul Fejos.

== Cast ==
- Gyula Csortos as Kovács
- Maria Mindzenty as Mari, Kovács lánya
- Antal Páger as Jani, Kovács fogadott fia
- Mór Ditrói as Szabó
- Ernõ Elekes as Mihály, Szabó fia
- Erzsi Palotai as Síró asszony
- Elemér Baló as Toronyõr

== Bibliography ==
- Günther Dahlke & Günter Karl. Deutsche Spielfilme von den Anfängen bis 1933: ein Filmführer. Henschelverlag Kunst und Gesellschaft, 1988.
