= The Last Performance =

1929 film

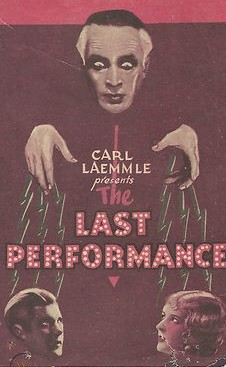
- Original pressbook artwork
- Directed by: Paul Fejos
- Screenplay by: Jame Ashmore Creelman
- Story by: James Ashmore Creelman
- Starring: Conrad Veidt; Mary Philbin; Leslie Fenton
- Cinematography: Hal Mohr
- Edited by: Edward L. Cahn; Robert Carlise; Robert Jahns
- Music by: Sam Percy
- Production company: Universal Pictures Corp.
- Distributed by: Universal Pictures Corp.
- Release date: November 2, 1929 (New York City)
- Running time: 68 min.
- Country: United States
- Languages: Sound (Part-Talkie); English intertitles

The Last Performance is a 1929 American sound part-talkie drama film directed by Paul Fejos and starring Conrad Veidt and Mary Philbin. In addition to sequences with audible dialogue or talking sequences, the film features a synchronized musical score and sound effects along with English intertitles. The soundtrack was recorded using the Western Electric sound-on-film system. The talking sequences were featured on the last reel.

== Premise ==
The Last Performance, silent version with Danish intertitles

Conrad Veidt stars as Erik the Great, a sinister stage magician who is in love with a woman half his age, Julie, played by Mary Philbin. A young thief, Mark Royce (played by Fred MacKaye) is caught stealing from Erik's apartment and is taken in at Julie's suggestion. Secretly she falls in love with the new apprentice. However, Erik's other apprentice, Buffo (played by Leslie Fenton) becomes aware of Julie's love for Mark, and driven by jealousy tells Erik. Buffo is later found killed, and Mark is the prime suspect.

== Cast ==
- Conrad Veidt as Erik the Great
- Mary Philbin as Julie Fergeron
- Leslie Fenton as Buffo Black
- Fred MacKaye as Mark Royce (credited as Fred Mac Kaye)
- Eddie Boland as Agent
- Anders Randolf as Judge
- Sam De Grasse as District Attorney
- Gusztáv Pártos as Theatre Manager (as Gustav Paros)
- William H. Turner as Booking Agent
- George Irving as Defense Attorney

== Production ==
According to the Exhibitors Herald and Moving Picture World, filming began on July 30, 1928, withwroking titles that included The Play Goes On and The Last Call. The film made use of set from The Phantom of the Opera (1925). The film was made in both sound and silent versions. The original sound version had 272 feet more film than the silent one. The silent version is the only version known to have survived. The original reels had a runtime of 72 to 80 minutes. A mute print with Danish titles also survives. This print is a copy of the International Sound Version and has a longer running time of 60 minutes. It is not known whether the soundtrack to this version survives on Vitaphone type disc.

Both Veidt's and Philbin's contracts with Universal were cancelled before the film's release.

Michael R. Pitts described the style of the film as not being a horror film, but "a dark drama with genre overtones".

== Release ==
The film debuted in October 1929. It was released in Great Britain as Erik the Great.

In 2012, The Criterion Collection included The Last Performance and a reconstructed sound version of Broadway as extra features on the DVD and Blu-ray release of Fejos' 1928 film, Lonesome. The silent version was released by the Criterion Collection on Blu-ray and DVD with Fejos' Lonesome in August 2012. The DVD release runs about 59 minutes.

== Reception ==
From contemporary review, a review in Hollywood Filmography praised the film saying "its outstanding quality is the performance of Veidt, which is one of the most effective the American screen has witnessed" and that "the photography at times was most effective, and the settings macabre enough to carry out the gruesome action and drama." The Boston Herald reported that Veidt was "a master of subtle and telling pantomime, his gesture are eloquent in their dark simplicity and his face is one of the most interesting and expressive that we [have] ever seen." A review in The New York Times commented that "Fejos has handled his scenes with no small digress of imagination. Moreover, the narrative is developed [sic?] with a certain force and skill. While some of the straight camera work is not up to scratch, there are number of photographic feats that are quite effective."

Conversely, Photoplay declared it "a much over-acted and over-directed film" while Variety stated that it was "one of the draggiest pictures made with the photography of the poorest. Apparently, Paul Fejos was up against handicaps at the start, with a story that is more foreign than domestic in brand, he sought to give it the German touch." Harrison's Reports summarized the film as "Good acting, but mediocre entertainment. The story is somewhat gruesome."

Pitts praised Veidt's performance, stating he gave a "tour de force performance as Erik, imbuing the character with multiple characteristics, including mystery, tenderness, philanthropy and vengeance." and that the actor was matched by Mary Philbin.
