= Sirius (1942 film) =

1942 film

- Directed by: Dezső Ákos Hamza
- Written by: Péter Rákóczi
- Based on: Sirius by Ferenc Herczeg
- Produced by: Dezső Ákos Hamza
- Starring: Katalin Karády; László Szilassy; Elemér Baló
- Cinematography: Rudolf Icsey
- Edited by: Mária Vály
- Music by: Tibor Polgár
- Production company: Magyar Írók Filmje
- Release date: 5 September 1942
- Running time: 98 minutes
- Country: Hungary
- Language: Hungarian

Sirius (Hungarian: Szíriusz) is a 1942 Hungarian science fiction film directed by Dezső Ákos Hamza and starring Katalin Karády, László Szilassy and Elemér Baló. It is based on the 1894 novel of the same title by Ferenc Herczeg and the 1910 theatre adaptation by Imre Földes. It was shot at the Hunnia Studios in Budapest. The film's sets were designed by the art director Klára B. Kokas. It premiered at the wartime 1942 Venice Film Festival, the last held under the regime of Benito Mussolini.

== Cast ==
- Katalin Karády as Beppo Rosina / Sergius Rózsi
- László Szilassy as Tibor Ákos gróf
- Elemér Baló as Sergius professzor
- Géza Berczy as Osztrák báró
- Jenő Bodnár as Kegyelmes úr
- Ilona Bánhidy as Hercegnő
- Endre C. Turáni as Kaunitz gróf
- Jenő Danis as Színész
- Sári Déry as Párkányi Kata
- Dóra Fáy Kiss as Ápolónő
- Zoltán Greguss as Osztrák
- Gusztáv Harasztos as Orvosok
- Zoltán Szakáts as Orvosok
- Sándor Hidassy as Gvadányi
- Szapáry Sándor as Orczy Lőrinc
- Lajos Ihász as Inas
- Lajos Kelemen as Hadur
- István Lontay as Nádasdy, magyar nemes
- Zoltán Makláry as Inas
- Makláry János as Osztrák báró
- Antal Matány as Osztrák nemes
- Ila Nagy as Terka
- Sándor Pethes as Cafarelli az énekes
- Gusztáv Pártos as Abbé
- Lajos Rajczy as Tibor Gergely gróf
- Nusi Somogyi as Grófnő
- Lajos Sugár as Hoppmester
- Gusztáv Vándory as Udvarmester
- Antal Matány as osztrák nemes
- István Lontay as Nádasdy, magyar nemes
- Jenő Szabó
- László Misoga
- Táncospár Kuscherow

== Bibliography ==
- Cunningham, John. Hungarian Cinema: From Coffee House to Multiplex. Wallflower Press, 2004.
- Juhász, István. Kincses magyar filmtár 1931-1944: az eredeti forgatókönyvből 1931 és 1944 között létrejött hazai mozgóképekről. Kráter, 2007.
- Rîpeanu, Bujor. (ed.) International Directory of Cinematographers, Set- and Costume Designers in Film: Hungary (from the beginnings to 1988). Saur, 1981.
