= Spring Shower =

1932 film

- Directed by: Pál Fejös
- Written by: Ilona Fülöp
- Starring: Annabella; Ilona Dajbukát; Erzsi Bársony; Steven Geray
- Cinematography: István Eiben
- Edited by: György Feld
- Music by: László Angyal; Vincent Scotto
- Production company: Palatinus Filmterjesztõ Vállalat
- Release date: 4 November 1932
- Running time: 78 minutes
- Countries: France; Hungary
- Language: Hungarian

Spring Shower (Hungarian: Tavaszi zápor) is a 1932 French-Hungarian drama film directed by Pál Fejös and starring Annabella, Ilona Dajbukát and Erzsi Bársony. A French-language version Marie, légende hongroise and a Romanian-language version Prima dragoste were also released. It was made by the French-based producer Adolphe Osso who had money reserves frozen by the Hungarian government, and needed to spend the money in Hungary.

== Cast ==
- Annabella - Szabó Mária
- Ilona Dajbukát - A jegyzõné
- Erzsi Bársony - A jegyzõné lánya
- Steven Geray - Urasági intézõ
- Karola Zala - A Fortuna tulajdonosa
- Margit Ladomerszky - A kávéház szépe
- Sándor Pethes - Táncmester
- Lajos Várady - Táncmester
- Zoltán Makláry -Vasutas
- Gusztáv Vándory - Tisztelendõ
- Lajos Ihász - Patikus
- György Kerekes - Egy ficsúr

== Bibliography ==
- Buranbaeva, Oksana & Mladineo, Vanja. Culture and Customs of Hungary. ABC-CLIO, 2011.
- Burns, Bryan. World Cinema: Hungary. Fairleigh Dickinson University Press, 1996.
- Cunningham, John. Hungarian Cinema: From Coffee House to Multiplex. Wallflower Press, 2004.
