= Captain of the Guard (film) =

1930 film

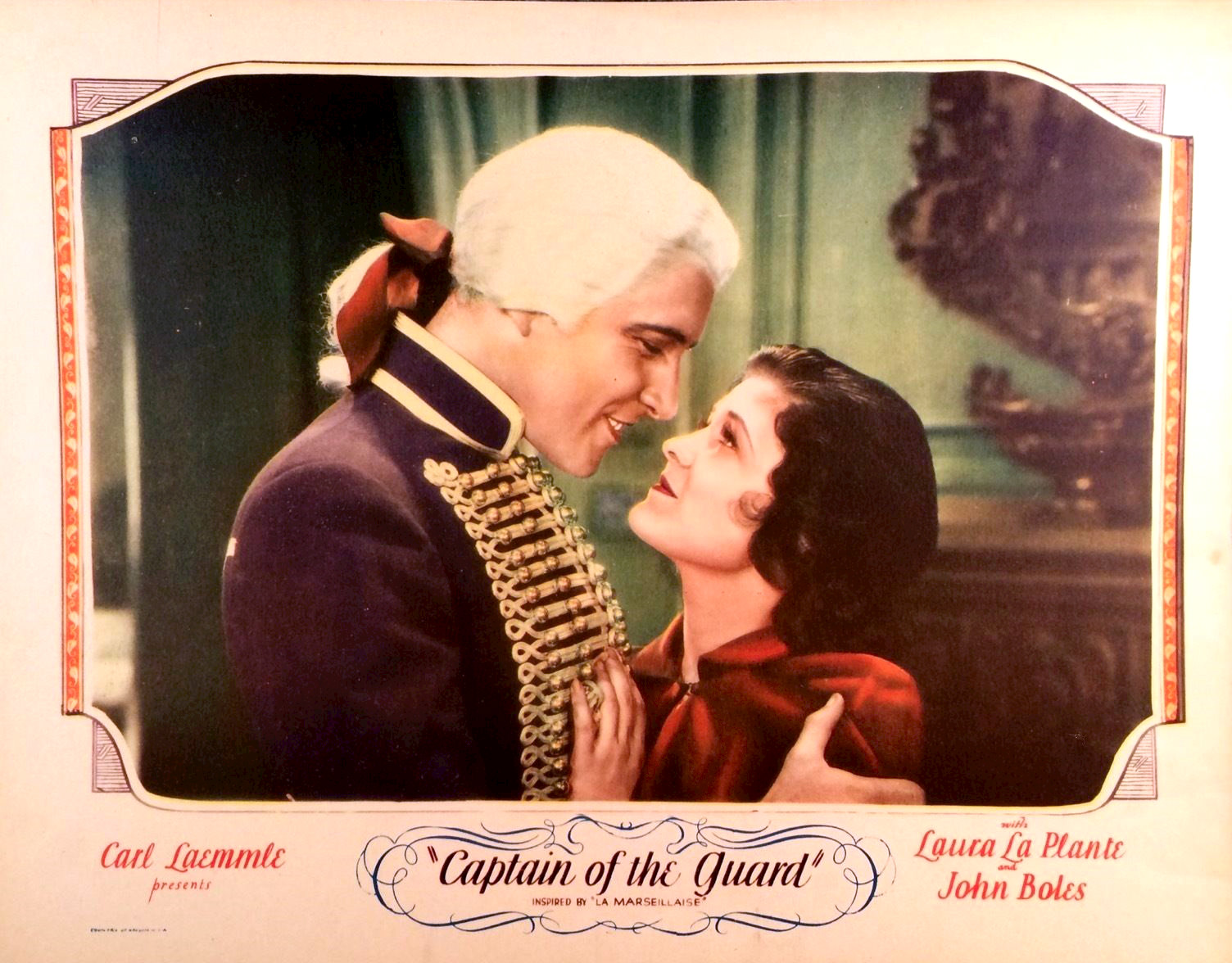
- Lobby card
- Directed by: John S. Robertson; Pál Fejös (uncredited)
- Written by: George Manker Watters; Arthur Ripley
- Story by: Houston Branch
- Starring: Laura La Plante; John Boles; Sam De Grasse
- Cinematography: Gilbert Warrenton; Hal Mohr
- Edited by: Milton Carruth; Ted J. Kent
- Music by: Charles Wakefield Cadman; Heinz Roemheld
- Production company: Universal Pictures
- Distributed by: Universal Pictures
- Release date: March 29, 1930 (U.S.)
- Running time: 83 minutes
- Country: United States
- Language: English

Captain of the Guard is a 1930 American musical film directed by John S. Robertson and Pál Fejös and starring Laura La Plante, John Boles and Sam De Grasse. It is set during the French Revolution, but was sufficiently unhistorical that an apology was included in the opening credit for any factual inaccuracies.

== Plot ==
During the French Revolution, Rouget de l'Isle, a captain in the king's guard and music teacher, falls in love with Marie Marnay, the daughter of an innkeeper. Marie becomes involved with the revolutionaries after her father is killed by royal soldiers. Although Rouget initially serves the monarchy, he later joins the revolutionary cause after performing La Marseillaise before King Louis XVI and Queen Marie Antoinette. He eventually leads revolutionary forces toward Paris and reunites with Marie during the uprising.

== Cast ==
- Laura La Plante as Marie Marnay
- John Boles as Rouget de Lisle
- Sam De Grasse as Bazin
- James A. Marcus as Marnay
- Lionel Belmore as Colonel of Hussars
- Stuart Holmes as Louis XVI
- Evelyn Hall as Marie Antoinette
- Claude Fleming as Magistrate
- Murdock MacQuarrie as Pierre
- Richard Cramer as Danton
- Harry Burkhardt as Materown
- George Hackathorne as Robespierre
- DeWitt Jennings as priest
- Harry Cording as Le Bruin
- Otis Harlan as Jacques
- Ervin Renard as Lieutenant
- Walter Brennan as peasant (uncredited)
- Sidney D'Albrook as flirtatious officer (uncredited)
- Louise Emmons as Peasant (uncredited)
- Stanley Fields as Hangman (uncredited)
- Francis Ford as Hussars Officer (uncredited)
- Charles Thurston as Minor Role (uncredited)

== Production ==
Initial director Pál Fejös escaped serious injury during filming in October 1929 after falling 88 feet from scaffolding while directing a mob scene, and was later replaced by John S. Robertson. Robertson received full directing credit for the film.
