= Boston Blackie (film) =

1923 film by Scott R. Dunlap

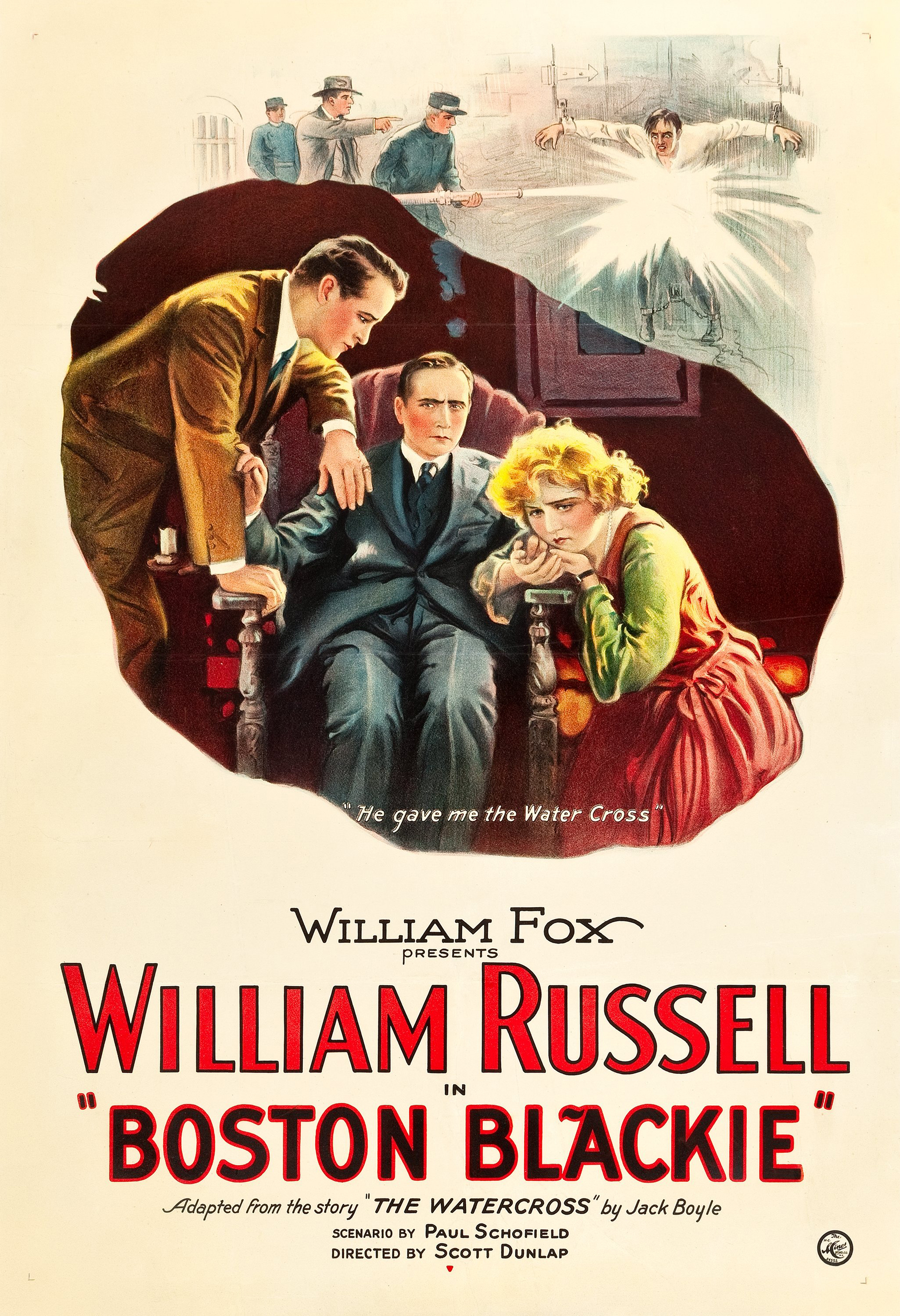
- Theatrical release poster
- Directed by: Scott R. Dunlap
- Screenplay by: Paul Schofield
- Based on: The Water Cross by Jack Boyle
- Starring: William Russell; Eva Novak; Frank Brownlee; Otto Matieson; W. C. Robinson; Fred Esmelton
- Cinematography: George Schneiderman
- Production company: Fox Film Corporation
- Distributed by: Fox Film Corporation
- Release date: May 6, 1923
- Running time: 50 minutes
- Country: United States
- Language: English

Boston Blackie is a lost 1923 American crime film directed by Scott R. Dunlap and written by Paul Schofield. The film stars William Russell, Eva Novak, Frank Brownlee, Otto Matieson, W. C. Robinson and Fred Esmelton. The film was released on May 6, 1923, by Fox Film Corporation.

== Cast ==
- William Russell as Boston Blackie
- Eva Novak as Mary Carter
- Frank Brownlee as Warden Benton
- Otto Matieson as Danny Carter
- W. C. Robinson as Shorty McNutt
- Fred Esmelton as John Gilmore

== Preservation ==
With no prints of Boston Blackie located in any film archives, it is a lost film.
