= Leon Shamroy =

American cinematographer (1901–1974)

- Born: July 16, 1901; New York City, U.S.
- Died: July 7, 1974 (aged 72); Los Angeles, California, U.S.
- Occupation: Cinematographer
- Title: A.S.C. President (1947–48)
- Spouses: Rosamond Marcus (m. 1925; div. 1937) Audrey Mason (m. 1938; div. 1948) Mary Anderson (m. 1953)
- Children: 4
- Awards: Best Cinematography: Cleopatra (1963); Leave Her to Heaven (1945); Wilson (1944); The Black Swan (1942)

Leon Shamroy, A.S.C. (July 16, 1901 – July 7, 1974) was an American film cinematographer known for his work in 20th Century Fox motion pictures shot in Technicolor. He and Charles Lang share the record for most Oscar nominations for Cinematography. During his half-century career, he gained 18 nominations with 4 wins, sharing the record for wins with Joseph Ruttenberg.

== Early life and career ==
In 1889, Shamroy's Russian father, family name Shamroyevsky, came to the United States to visit his brother, a revolutionary who had fled the homeland and become a physician in the U.S. Shamroy's father liked the United States and decided to stay. After he settled, he took a degree in chemistry at Columbia University and later opened a drugstore.

Shamroy was educated at Cooper Union (1918), City College of New York (1919–20), and Columbia University (where he studied mechanical engineering). A product of a practical-minded family, young Leon often worked after school in one of his uncle's offices as a junior draftsman. Eventually he became an engineer himself, but left the field owing to inadequate remuneration. Some of his family migrated to California and became affiliated with D. W. Griffith. In 1920, he joined them at the Fox lab to help with the laboratory work and went on to spend thirteen years as a struggling technician.

His career in cinema began with experimental film shot on speculation and with the most rudimentary equipment. He became a cameraman in the 1920s when he filmed many of Charles Hutchinson's action films for Pathé. His first experimental film, The Last Moment (1928), was a collaboration with the Hungarian director Paul Fejos. It was the first silent film made without explanatory titles and was voted honor film of 1928 by the National Board of Review. Another film, Blindfold (In the Fog) attracted the attention of Hollywood, some of whom described Shamroy's camerawork as "worth its weight in gold."

Around this time, Shamroy went to Mexico where he worked for Robert Flaherty on a film called Acoma, the Sky City, a story about an ancient Indian tribe. The footage was destroyed when the warehouse in which it was stored went up in flames. Flaherty wanted to form a new company and invited Shamroy's participation, but after paying his $10 union fee Shamroy only had $15 left. Instead, he made a two-reel documentary film based on an Indian legend. It was never released. Shamroy's next employment was at Columbia with Harry Cohn. It lasted five days. After his brief stint at Columbia, Shamroy worked for Jack Cummings, Louis B. Mayer's nephew, on a series of MGM parodies of the famous screen epics, starring dogs. In one of the films, So Quiet on the Canine Front, the dogs were so realistic that when they were shot down the Humane Society was enraged.

Shamroy's next engagement was with an ethnological project in Asia that turned into something of a nightmare. He and the crew were terrified when a fourth-class passenger on the ship they were sailing on, the Empress of Canada, ran amok and stabbed thirty people to death two days out of Yokohama. Years later, while working on a picture called Crash Dive (1943), he learned that the star, Tyrone Power, had experienced the same shipboard horror. Somehow, Shamroy managed to survive the ordeal with his camera and 100,000 feet of film intact. He traveled throughout Japan in 1930 and shot a lot of contraband footage. He left for China where, again, he shot secret footage before continuing on to Manila. He made films in places as far distant as the Dutch East Indies, Bali, Samarai, and Batavia. During World War II, he gave his material over to the War Department in Washington, D.C., which used it to determine bombing targets.

== Hollywood ==
B. P. Schulberg of Paramount spotted his work and signed him up in 1932. At the time, Shamroy was broke, for he had squandered what little money he had on "poor starving girls and on whiskey." John M. Stahl, for whom Shamroy later shot Leave Her to Heaven (1945) saw his film, The Last Moment, and, though highly impressed, thought Shamroy was "too artistic."

Three-Cornered Moon (1933) was the first of several films he did with Claudette Colbert. During this period, he developed a solid reputation for understated black-and-white photography. In a loan to Columbia, briefly his employer in the previous decade, Shamroy used zoom lenses on Private Worlds (1935), directed by Gregory La Cava, long before they were commonly used. This was a film about mental illness, and the zoom lens was especially effective on the scene where Big Boy Williams, a patient, goes berserk. At the time, zoom lenses were few and far between and there were no light meters.

Shamroy left Paramount with B. P. Schulberg's fall from grace. Soon thereafter, David O. Selznick sent for him to make a test for Janet Gaynor. However, to his dismay, Shamroy discovered that tests were being done of her by other cameramen to see which one they liked best. Karl Struss was one of the others; he took 12 hours to Shamroy's twenty minutes. Shamroy was hired to do the picture, The Young in Heart (1938).

With his talent and abilities now recognized, Shamroy landed a job through Myron Selznick at 20th Century Fox, where he remained for the next 30 years. It was during his tenure there that he developed his technique of using minimal lighting on a set. A film that Shamroy was quite proud of was Wilson (1944), a pacifist film made during World War II. It was never shown to the troops, for obvious reasons. For this picture, natural interiors were used, which was quite unusual in those days. One scene done in the Shrine Ballroom required that the lights be hidden behind flags. It took a hundred men moving arcs around the ballroom. Darryl F. Zanuck was so surprised by the first shots that he kissed Shamroy to the cheers of the staff. With 5,000 people in the blaze of light and hundreds of flags flapping, the re-creation of the Baltimore Democratic Convention of 1912 was a most startling shot on the screen.

In 1946, he shot Marilyn Monroe's first screen test. On her screen test, he recalled: "I thought, this girl will be another Harlow. Her natural beauty plus her inferiority complex gave her a look of mystery. I got a cold chill. This girl had something I hadn't seen since silent pictures. She had kind of a fantastic beauty like Gloria Swanson, and she got sex on a piece of film like Jean Harlow. Every frame of the test radiated sex. She didn't need a sound track, she was creating effects visually. She was showing us she could sell emotions in pictures."

== Later career ==
During the 1950s, Shamroy filmed most of Fox's big pictures. Of all his films, he was most proud of The Snows of Kilimanjaro (1952). Despite the title, almost all of Snows was shot in the studio. A few establishing shots of the real mountain were undertaken by Charles G. Clarke.

The Robe (1953) was the first film to be shot using the Cinemascope process. The widescreen aspect ratio was an almost unparalleled challenge for Shamroy. While he helped many directors at Fox in the 1950s to adapt to the requirements of Cinemascope, Shamroy never really liked the new process. In an interview with Charles Higham, Shamroy exclaimed: "But those widescreen 'revolutions'; oh my God! You got a stage play again, you put pictures back to the earliest sound day...But though it wrecked the art of film for a decade, widescreen saved the picture business." Despite his reservations about Cinemascope, he became an industry pioneer in the 1950s/60s rush to develop new film formats. In 1956, he utilized Fox's Cinemascope 55 process. Here, a 55mm strip of film offered increased clarity in both color and definition. Although The King and I (1956) was shot using the process, it was only released in 35mm reduction prints. Two years later Shamroy photographed South Pacific in a new process called Todd-AO. With a film size of 65mm and more versatile projectors able to adapt to any film gauge, Shamroy's technique was apparent. Shamroy shot three other films in this way: Porgy and Bess (1959), Cleopatra (1963), and The Agony and the Ecstasy (1965).

Shamroy once noted: "The obtrusive camera is like a chattering person—something we can do without. It's okay for the camera to join the conversation, so to speak, but it must never dominate. It must never distract from the story. The real art of cinematography lies in the camera's ability to match the varied moods of players and story, or the pace of the scene."

Shamroy was notable for being gruff and short-tempered, regularly clashing with directors Rouben Mamoulian, John M. Stahl, and Otto Preminger. He was also known for being a perfectionist, something that Fritz Lang and Henry Fonda found irritating during filming of You Only Live Once. He once claimed that Lee Garmes "will never see the day that he's as good as I am and that goes for anybody in the motion picture business", implying that he saw himself as better than any other cinematographer.

Shamroy died in 1974 at the age of 72.

== Family ==
He was married three times and had four children. On November 1, 1925, he married Rosamond Marcus, who gave birth to his son, Paul Shamroy (August 24, 1926 - May 12, 1969). They divorced in February 1937. He then married Audrey Mason, daughter of E. Mason Hopper, on February 2, 1938. They had two children: Patricia Mason and Timothy Cullinan. Their marriage ended in a divorce on April 23, 1948. From May 12, 1953, until his death, he was married to movie actress Mary Anderson. He and Anderson had one son, Anderson Alexander Shamroy, who died July 1, 1956, at the age of two months.

== Academy Awards ==
Year	Title	Result
1938	The Young in Heart	Nominated
1940	Down Argentine Way	Nominated
1942	Ten Gentlemen from West Point	Nominated
1942	The Black Swan	Won
1944	Wilson	Won
1945	Leave Her to Heaven	Won
1949	Prince of Foxes	Nominated
1951	David and Bathsheba	Nominated
1952	The Snows of Kilimanjaro	Nominated
1953	The Robe	Nominated
1954	The Egyptian	Nominated
1955	Love Is a Many-Splendored Thing	Nominated
1956	The King and I	Nominated
1958	South Pacific	Nominated
1959	Porgy and Bess	Nominated
1963	Cleopatra	Won
1963	The Cardinal	Nominated
1965	The Agony and the Ecstasy	Nominated

== Additional films ==
- Pirates of the Sky (1926)
- The Trunk Mystery (1926)
- Tongues of Scandal (1927)
- Hidden Aces (1927)
- Bitter Sweets (1928)
- The Tell-Tale Heart (1928)
- Out with the Tide (1928)
- Alma de Gaucho (1930)
- Women Men Marry (1931)
- Stowaway (1932)
- Her Bodyguard (1933)
- Jennie Gerhardt (1933)
- Good Dame (1934)
- Thirty-Day Princess (1934)
- Kiss and Make-Up (1934)
- She Married Her Boss (1935)
- Accent on Youth (1935)
- Mary Burns, Fugitive (1935)
- Soak the Rich (1936)
- You Only Live Once (1937)
- Made for Each Other (1939)
- The Adventures of Sherlock Holmes (1939)
- The Story of Alexander Graham Bell (1939)
- Little Old New York (1940)
- Lillian Russell (1940)
- Four Sons (1940)
- Tin Pan Alley (1940)
- The Great American Broadcast (1941)
- That Night in Rio (1941)
- Moon Over Miami (1941)
- Roxie Hart (1942)
- Crash Dive (1943)
- Stormy Weather (1943)
- Claudia (1943)
- Buffalo Bill (1944)
- A Tree Grows in Brooklyn (1945)
- The Shocking Miss Pilgrim (1947)
- That Lady in Ermine (1948)
- Cheaper by the Dozen (1950)
- King of the Khyber Rifles (1953)
- Good Morning, Miss Dove (1955)
- The Girl Can't Help It (1956)
- Desk Set (1957)
- John Goldfarb, Please Come Home (1965)
- Do Not Disturb (1965)
- The Glass Bottom Boat (1966)
- Caprice (also appeared in) (1967)
- Planet of the Apes (1968)

== Other notable events ==
- Directory of photography with Schulberg Productions, 1933–37
- Director of photography with Selznick International 1938
- Director of Cinematography with 20th Century Fox 1933–
- President of the Academy Award Winners School of Photography, Incorporated, 1946
- Film Daily Critics Award 1949, 53, 54, 55
- Motion Picture Association of America (chairman of the photography committee research division 1946–1950)
- Society of Motion Picture Engineers Club

== Sources ==
- International Photographer Magazine, 1997
- Who's Who in America 1960–1961
