= Fred Esmelton =

American actor

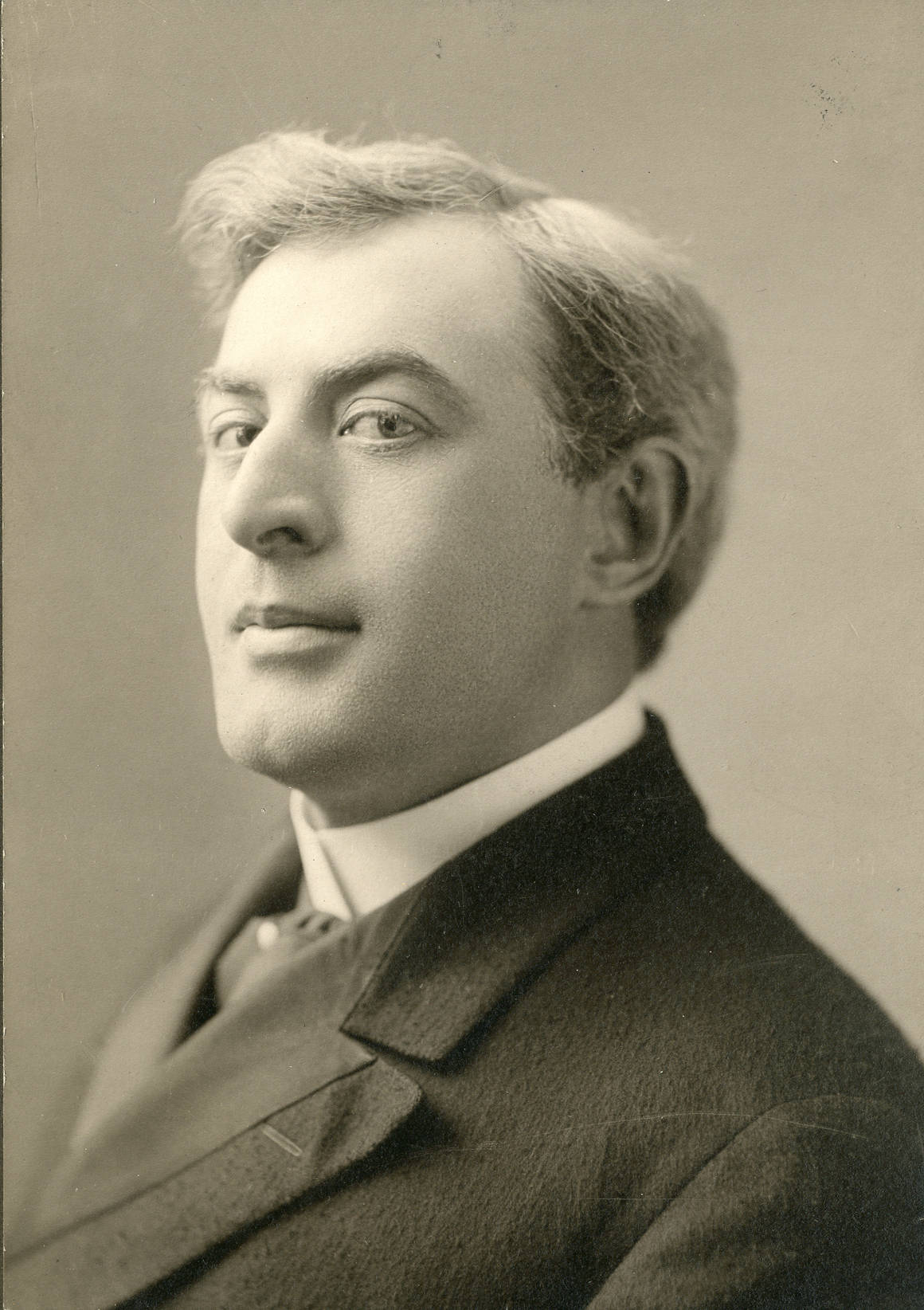
- Esmelton in 1904
- Born: Frederick Batty Green Bryant; June 22, 1872; Melbourne, Australia
- Died: October 23, 1933 (aged 61); Los Angeles, California, US
- Resting place: Hollywood Forever Cemetery, Hollywood, California (Los Angeles County)
- Other names: Frederick Bryant Esmelton; Frederick Esmelton Bryant
- Occupation: Actor
- Years active: 1916–1931
- Spouses: Jewel Power; Mary Hall

Frederick Bryant Esmelton, known as Fred Esmelton (born Frederick Batty Green Bryant; June 22, 1872 – October 23, 1933) was an Australian-born American film actor, as well as a stage actor and director. He appeared in 30 films, usually in supporting roles, between the years 1916 and 1931. He was born in Melbourne, Victoria and died in Los Angeles, California.

== Career ==
According to census documents, he was born in Victoria, Australia, the son of Robert Chapple Bryant. On his 1922 American naturalization documents, Esmelton's birth name was listed as Frederick Batty Green Bryant, and when he established residence in the United States, he sometimes used the name Frederick Esmelton Bryant. Sometime in the mid-1920s, he legally changed his name to Frederick Bryant Esmelton. While best known as a silent film actor, he also performed in numerous stage plays, especially on the west coast. For example, beginning in 1903, he led a troupe in Portland, Oregon, where he portrayed a number of roles for several years. But Esmelton was not just a stage actor: he was a frequent director of stage plays. In fact, when he worked for the Bijou Stock Company, one New Haven, Connecticut theater critic said he was "one of the ablest stage directors ever known in the field of stock work." And Esmelton also served as the manager of an acting troupe based in Pittsburgh, Pennsylvania. Among the up-and-coming film stars who got their start working for him in Pittsburgh was Richard Dix. Esmelton frequently returned to his native Australia to perform in stage plays, some of which he produced. And during the first World War, he was in a theater company sponsored by the Knights of Columbus that volunteered to go and entertain the troops in France. While he was seldom cast in a starring role during his silent film career, he became known as a versatile supporting actor, for which he was often praised by critics.

Esmelton was married several times. One of his wives was silent film actress Jewel Power (real name: Louise Power), with whom he had acted when both were in the Baker Stock Company in Portland, Oregon. After they divorced, he married Shakespearean actress Mary Hall, whose career he had managed while they worked in Pittsburgh.

In addition to his acting career, in 1925, Esmelton was among the eight actors who founded the Masquers, a club where actors and directors could gather and fraternize. It remained in operation for more than six decades. He helped to arrange its early events and was the club's first manager. In his later years, in semi-retirement, Esmelton owned and operated a successful catering business in Hollywood, whose clients included some of the film studios where he had worked. He died in Los Angeles in October 1933, at the age of 61.

== Partial filmography ==
- The Law of Compensation (1917)
- Come Out of the Kitchen (1919)
- The Avalanche (1919)
- The Misleading Widow (1919)
- Dulcy (1923)
- Can a Woman Love Twice? (1923)
- Boston Blackie (1923)
- Conductor 1492 (1924)
- Lady of the Night (1925)
- Raffles, the Amateur Cracksman (1925)
- Red Hot Tires (1925)
- California Straight Ahead (1925)
- Smooth as Satin (1925)
- Kid Boots (1926)
- The Winning of Barbara Worth (1926)
- The Chinese Parrot (1927)
- The Shield of Honor (1927)
- The Gay Defender (1927)
- Lonesome (1928)
- The Michigan Kid (1928)
- Romance of a Rogue (1928)
- The Baby Cyclone (1928)
- Born to Love (1931)
