= Lothar Wolff =

German film editor, producer and assistant director (1909-1988)

- Born: 13 May 1909; Bromberg, German Empire
- Died: 2 October 1988 (aged 79); New York, New York, United States
- Occupations: Editor, producer
- Years active: 1930–1973 (film)

Lothar Wolff (13 May 1909 – 2 October 1988) was a German film editor, producer and assistant director. He worked in Weimar Germany on films such as The Testament of Dr. Mabuse (1933). Following the rise of the Nazi party to power he left Germany, working in Austria, France and Denmark before eventually settling in the United States. In America he became known for his work on the documentary March of Time series.

== Selected filmography ==
- Die Fledermaus (1931)
- The Perfume of the Lady in Black (1931)
- King of the Hotel (1932)
- Rouletabille the Aviator (1932)
- Love in Morocco (1933)
- Voices of Spring (1933)
- King of the Ritz (1933)
- Judgment of Lake Balaton (1933)
- The Testament of Dr. Mabuse (1933)
- Flight from the Millions (1934)
- Prisoner Number One (1935)
- The Golden Smile (1935)

== Bibliography ==
- Jonathan Stuart. The March of Time and the American Century. ProQuest, 2007.
