= The Verdict of Lake Balaton =

1933 film

- Directed by: Pál Fejös
- Written by: Serge Plaute
- Starring: Antal Páger; Ernõ Elekes; Gyula Csortos; Mária Medgyesi
- Cinematography: István Eiben
- Music by: Viktor Vaszy
- Production company: Osso Film
- Release date: 2 March 1933
- Country: Hungary
- Language: Hungarian

The Verdict of Lake Balaton (Hungarian: Ítél a Balaton) is a 1933 Hungarian drama film directed by Pál Fejös and starring Antal Páger, Ernõ Elekes and Gyula Csortos. An English-language version, a German-language version Judgment of Lake Balaton (Menschen im Sturm) and a French-language version (Tempêtes) were also released.

== Cast ==
- Antal Páger - János
- Ernõ Elekes - Mihály
- Gyula Csortos - Kovács
- Mária Medgyesi - Mari
- Mór Ditrói - Szabó
- Erzsi Palotai - Síró asszony
- Elemér Baló - Toronyőr

== Bibliography ==
- Buranbaeva, Oksana & Mladineo, Vanja. Culture and Customs of Hungary. ABC-CLIO, 2011.
- Burns, Bryan. World Cinema: Hungary. Fairleigh Dickinson University Press, 1996.
- Cunningham, John. Hungarian Cinema: From Coffee House to Multiplex. Wallflower Press, 2004.
