= Tom Reed (screenwriter) =

American screenwriter

- Born: December 24, 1901; Shelton, Washington, United States
- Died: August 17, 1961 (aged 59); Long Beach, California, United States
- Occupation: Writer
- Years active: 1925–1960 (film & TV)

Tom Reed (1901–1961) was an American screenwriter. He began his career working at Universal Pictures and later spent time at Warner Brothers, 20th Century Fox and MGM. His 1954 screenplay for Night People was nominated for the Academy Award for Best Story. His final years were spent working in television.

== Filmography ==
- The Phantom of the Opera (1925)
- Painted Ponies (1927)
- A Man's Past (1927)
- Galloping Fury (1927)
- The Lone Eagle (1927)
- The Last Performance (1927)
- Wild Beauty (1927)
- Out All Night (1927)
- Stop That Man! (1928)
- Thanks for the Buggy Ride (1928)
- Good Morning, Judge (1928)
- Red Lips (1928)
- A Trick of Hearts (1928)
- The First Kiss (1928)
- The Grip of the Yukon (1928)
- Finders Keepers (1928)
- The Rawhide Kid (1928)
- The Last Warning (1928)
- Lonesome (1928)
- Midnight Rose (1928)
- Broadway (1929)
- Synthetic Sin (1929)
- The Girl on the Barge (1929)
- Show Boat (1929)
- The Charlatan (1929)
- Scandal (1929)
- Melody Lane (1929)
- Hell's Heroes (1929)
- The Night Ride (1930)
- The Storm (1930)
- East Is West (1930)
- Oriente es Occident (1930)
- The Boudoir Diplomat (1930)
- Don Juan diplomático (1931)
- Boudoir diplomatique (1931)
- Reckless Living (1931)
- The Homicide Squad (1931)
- Bad Sister (1931)
- Lasca of the Rio Grande (1931)
- Waterloo Bridge (1931)
- Law and Order (1932)
- Murders in the Rue Morgue (1932)
- Radio Patrol (1932)
- Afraid to Talk (1932)
- Laughter in Hell (1933)
- S.O.S. Iceberg (1933)
- Bombay Mail (1934)
- Babbitt (1934)
- Love Birds (1934)
- The Man with Two Faces (1934)
- The Florentine Dagger (1935)
- Bride of Frankenstein (1935)
- Mary Jane's Pa (1935)
- The Case of the Curious Bride (1935)
- The Case of the Velvet Claws (1936)
- Love Begins at Twenty (1936)
- The Captain's Kid (1936)
- The Great O'Malley (1937)
- San Quentin (1937)
- Marry the Girl (1937)
- Gold Diggers of 1937 (1937)
- Over the Wall (1938)
- On Dress Parade (1939)
- Calling Philo Vance (1940)
- The Man Who Talked Too Much (1940)
- Hello, Annapolis (1942)
- The Loves of Edgar Allan Poe (1942)
- Pittsburgh (1942)
- The Spoilers (1942)
- Two Tickets to London (1943)
- Up in Mabel's Room (1944)
- Moss Rose (1947)
- The Spirit of West Point (1947)
- The Untamed Breed (1948)
- Red Stallion in the Rockies (1949)
- David Harding, Counterspy (1950)
- Soldiers Three (1951)
- The Light Touch (1951)
- Back to God's Country (1953)
- Night People (1954)

== Personal ==
In 1940, a $663 court judgment was entered against Reed for a "beating administered" when an attorney, Louis L. Goldman, served papers on him concerning an alimony claim by Reed's ex-wife.

== Bibliography ==
- Thomas McNulty. Errol Flynn: The Life and Career. McFarland, 2011.
