= Voices of Spring (1933 film) =

1933 film

- Directed by: Pál Fejös
- Written by: Richard Arvay; Otto Ewing; Fritz Rau
- Produced by: Ernst Wolff
- Starring: Adele Kern; S. Z. Sakall; Oskar Karlweis
- Cinematography: Heinrich Balasch; Oscar Bovill
- Edited by: Lothar Wolff
- Music by: Oscar Straus; Johann Strauss II
- Production company: Ernst-Wolff-Film
- Distributed by: Ifuk
- Release date: 16 November 1933
- Running time: 80 minutes
- Country: Austria
- Language: German

Voices of Spring (German: Frühlingsstimmen) is a 1933 Austrian operetta film directed by Pál Fejös and starring Adele Kern, S. Z. Sakall and Oskar Karlweis. The film is named after Johann Strauss II's waltz "Frühlingsstimmen".

== Cast ==
- Adele Kern as Hannerl Krüger
- S. Z. Sakall as Krüger, Teacher's Aide
- Oskar Karlweis as Franz Waldmüller
- Ursula Grabley as Olly Krüger
- Hans Thimig as Toni
- Frida Richard as Old Woman
- Theodor Danegger
- Teddy Bill
- Karl Ehmann
- Hermine Sterler
- Karl Zeska
- Sonia Lefkova as Dancer
- Vienna State Opera Ballet
- Vienna State Opera Chorus

== Bibliography ==
- Dassanowsky, Robert. World Film Locations: Vienna. Intellect Books, 2012.
