= 10th Venice International Film Festival (void) =

Italian film festival in 1942

"10th" Venice International Film Festival (considered void)
- Location: Venice, Italy
- Founded: 1932
- Festival date: 30 August – 5 September 1942
- Website: Website

The "10th" annual (void) Venice International Film Festival was held from 30 August to 5 September 1942. The events were hosted at places far away from the Lido and very few countries participated due to World War II and directors that were members of the Rome-Berlin axis. Additionally, a strong fascist political meddling from the Italian fascist government under Benito Mussolini had led to Italy experiencing a period of cultural depression oppressed by fascist propaganda. It is the last edition before the suspension for the Second World War.

== Jury ==
- Giuseppe Volpi di Misurata (Head of Jury)
- Joaquin Argamasilla
- Ottavio Croze
- Stavtscho Danailov
- Augusto Fantechi
- Wolfgang Fischer
- Mario Gromo
- Aladar Haasz
- Ferdinand Imhof
- Manuel Lopez Ribeiro
- Marijan Micac
- Karl Melzer
- Antonio Maraini
- Mihai Puscariu
- Yrio Erik Ranniko
- Stefan Ravasz
- Carl Vincent

== In Competition ==
English title	Original title	Director(s)	Production country
The Golden City	Die goldene Stadt	Veit Harlan	Nazi Germany
Bengasi		Augusto Genina	Kingdom of Italy
Alfa Tau!		Francesco De Robertis	Kingdom of Italy
The Great King	Der große König	Veit Harlan	Nazi Germany
Ala-Arriba!		José Leitão de Barros	Portugal
Sirius	Szíriusz	Dezsõ Ákos Hamza	Hungary

== Awards ==
- Mussolini Cup
  - Best Foreign Film - Der große König (Veit Harlan)
  - Best Italian Film - Bengasi (Augusto Genina)
- Volpi Cup
  - Best Actor - Fosco Giachetti (Bengasi)
  - Best Actress - Kristina Söderbaum (Die goldene Stadt)
- International Film Chamber Award
  - Technical - Alfa Tau! (Francesco De Robertis)
  - Color - Die goldene Stadt (Veit Harlan)
- Current Affairs
  - Die Deutsche Wochenschau
- Animation Design
  - Anacleto e la faina (Roberto Sgrilli)
  - Nel paese dei ranocchi (Antonio Rubino)
- Biennale Award
  - Ala-Arriba! (José Leitão de Barros)
  - Der große Schatten (Paul Verhoeven)
  - Vienna Blood (Willi Forst)
  - Noi vivi, Addio Kira! (Goffredo Alessandrini)
  - Odessa in Flames (Carmine Gallone)
  - Goyescas (Benito Perojo)
  - People of the Mountains (István Szőts)
- Biennale Medal
  - The Cursed Village (Florián Rey)
  - Snapphanar (Åke Ohberg)
  - Yli rajan (Wilho Ilmari)
  - Negyedíziglen (Zoltán Farkas)
- Biennale Medal for documentary
  - Le drapeau de l'humanité (Kurt Früh)
  - Comacchio (Fernando Cerchio)
  - Musica nel tempo (Edmondo Cancellieri)
  - Der Seeadler (Walter Hege and V. Loewenstein)
  - Erde auf Gewaltmärschen (Victor Borel)
  - Rocciatori ed aquile (Arturo Gemmiti)
  - I funerali (István Horty)
  - A kis kakuk (Béla Molnar)
