= Fritzi Jokl =

Austro-American operatic soprano

Fritzi Jokl (23 March 1895 – 15 October 1974) was an Austro-American operatic dramatic coloratura soprano.

== Life ==
Born in Vienna, Jokl's vocal training took place with the wife of the piano virtuoso Moriz Rosenthal, Mrs. Rosenthal-Ranner, among others. She received her first engagement in 1917 at the Oper Frankfurt. She stayed there until 1922 and sang many coloratura parts. Afterwards, Jokl changed for one season to the Landestheater Darmstadt (today Staatstheater Darmstadt), in order to finally sing under the conductor Eugen Szenkar, at first at the Theater des Westens (until 1925), then at the Cologne Opera (until 1926). The success there brought her an engagement at the Salzburg Festival (1928) she was Despina), a guest engagement at the Covent Garden Opera in London and finally a firm contract as first coloratura soprano at the Bavarian State Opera. Also, guest appearances at the Vienna State Opera (1930) and in Amsterdam (1932) proves her prominent position. A planned move to the Kroll Opera House in Berlin in 1932 did not come about because of its closure, so she returned to the Landestheater Darmstadt, where she was dismissed as a Jew after the seizure of power by the National Socialists in spring of 1933.

She still made some appearances at events of the Jüdischer Kulturbund under the conductors Joseph Rosenstock and Hans Wilhelm Steinberg and a tour of France with a travelling company. Then Jokl then had to emigrate to the USA via Austria, in 1936.

The Metropolitan Opera in New York turned down an engagement for the singer because her repertoire was already taken by Lily Pons and Bidu Sayão. Jokl subsequently ended her career and only performed in private. She settled in New York and married the author and journalist Jack Siegel.

In Darmstadt, a plaque was erected in the foyer of the Staatstheater in June 2011 in memory of the displaced Jewish employees of the Institute, including Jokl.

Fritzi Jokl died in New York City at the age of 79.

== Roles ==
Oper Frankfurt

- Rosina in Il barbiere di Siviglia
- Urbain in Les Huguenots
- Oscar in Un ballo in maschera
- Blondchen in Die Entführung aus dem Serail
- Sophie in Der Rosenkavalier

Berliner Volksoper

- Konstanze in Die Entführung aus dem Serail
- Norina in Don Pasquale
- Violetta in La traviata

Staatsoper München

- Zerbinetta in Ariadne auf Naxos (under the direction of the composer Richard Strauss)
- Gilda in Rigoletto
- Nedda in Pagliacci
- Olympia in Les contes d'Hoffmann
- Marzelline in Le nozze di Figaro
- Rosalinde in Die Fledermaus

Royal Opera, Covent Garden

- Najade and Zerbinetta in Ariadne auf Naxos
- Waldvogel in Siegfried

Salzburger Festspiele 1928

- Despina in Così fan tutte

Berliner Kulturbund

- Susanna in Le nozze di Figaro
- Olympia in Les contes d'Hoffmann
- Micaela in Carmen

Other roles

- Königin der Nacht in Die Zauberflöte
- Susanna in Le nozze di Figaro
- Cenerentola in Aschenbrödel oder der Triumph der Güte
- Galathea in the opera of the same name
- Inez in L'Africaine
- Le rossignol in the opera of the same name

== Discography ==
- Lebendige Vergangenheit – Fritzi Jokl. Preiser/Naxos, Vienna 1999
- Fritzi Jokl Heritáge 1924–1928. Dante Musikwelt-Tonträger 1998
- Four Famous Sopranos of the Past (Schöne, Jokl, Eisinger and Szabo). Preiser/Naxos, Vienna 1998
- Aus Münchens Operngeschichte, darin: Fritzi Jokl singt Don Pasquale: Auch ich versteh’ die feine Kunst. Preiser/Naxos, Vienna 1999
- ABC der Gesangskunst, Teil 6, Fritzi Jokl singt: Alessandro Stradella: Seid meiner Wonne stille Zeugen und Die Hugenotten: Nobles Seigneurs salut (Ihr edlen Herr’n allhier). Cantus-Line (DA Music), Diepholz 2002
