= The Last Moment (1928 film) =

1928 film

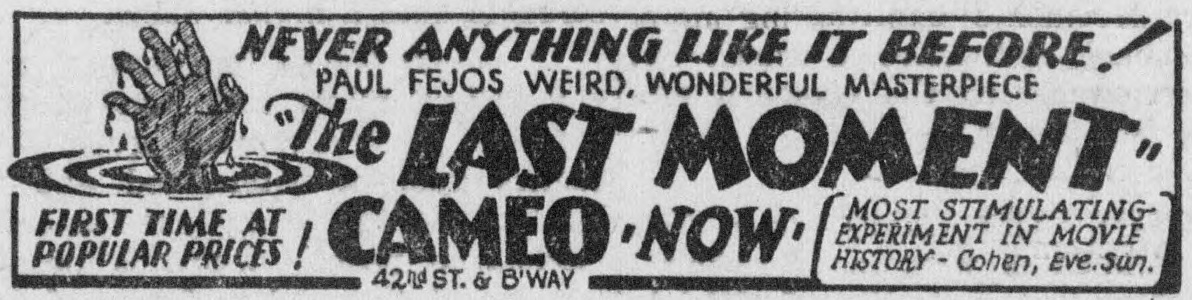
- Contemporary advertisement
- Directed by: Paul Fejos
- Written by: Paul Fejos
- Produced by: Samuel Freedman; Edward M. Spitz
- Starring: Otto Matieson; Georgia Hale
- Cinematography: Leon Shamroy
- Edited by: Paul Fejos
- Production company: Freedman-Spitz
- Distributed by: Zakoro Film Corporation
- Release date: February 1928
- Running time: Six reels
- Country: United States
- Language: Silent
- Budget: $13,000

The Last Moment is a 1928 American silent drama film conceived and directed by Paul Fejos. The film starred Otto Matieson and Georgia Hale.

Fejos made The Last Moment on a budget of US$13,000. The film told its story without intertitles, which was very unusual for a silent film, and used double- and triple-exposures and expressionistic editing, giving it a style that was not common for commercial releases of that period. Charlie Chaplin saw the film in a private screening and arranged for it to be theatrically released by United Artists. No print of The Last Moment is known to exist in any archive or private collection, and it is considered a lost film.

== Plot ==
A man drowns himself in lake. As he is dying, he recalls the crucial moments of his life and the incidents that led to his final, fatal decision. His unhappy childhood, his tumultuous decision to leave home and stow away on an ocean freighter, his unsuccessful attempts to become an actor, and his two tumultuous attempts at married life are relived. The film ends with the man walking towards the lake and wading deeper and deeper into its waters until he is no longer visible from the shore.

== Reception ==
The Last Moment received supportive reviews. Welford Beaton, writing in the Film Spectator, announced: “Introducing to you Mr. Paul Fejos, Genius.” Beaton added Fejos’ film was “one of the most outstanding works of cinematic art that was ever brought to the screen.” Mordaunt Hall, writing in The New York Times, stated the film displayed “a wonderful aptitude for true cinematic ideas” and “an enviable fund of imagination.”

== See also ==
- List of lost films
