= Lord Arthur Savile's Crime (play) =

1952 play

- Written by: Constance Cox
- Original language: English
- Genre: Comedy thriller

Premiere
- Date premiered: 28 July 1952
- Place premiered: Theatre Royal, Aldershot

Lord Arthur Savile's Crime is a 1952 comedy thriller play by the British writer Constance Cox, based on the short story Lord Arthur Savile's Crime by Oscar Wilde. After a palm reader convinces him it is his destiny to commit murder before he can marry his fiancée, an aristocrat makes several inept attempts to kill people.

It premiered at the Theatre Royal in Aldershot before transferring to the Court Theatre in London where it ran for 21 performances. The play was directed by Jack Hulbert and starred his younger brother Claude Hulbert in the title role, along with Peter Haddon and Jean Lodge.

In 1960, Gerald Savory adapted Cox's play into an episode of the Armchair Theatre anthology series on the ITV network in the UK.

== Bibliography ==
- Kabatchnik, Amnon. Blood on the Stage, 1950-1975: Milestone Plays of Crime, Mystery, and Detection. Scarecrow Press, 2011.
- Wearing, J.P. The London Stage 1950-1959: A Calendar of Productions, Performers, and Personnel. Rowman & Littlefield, 2014.
