= Broadway (1929 film) =

1929 film

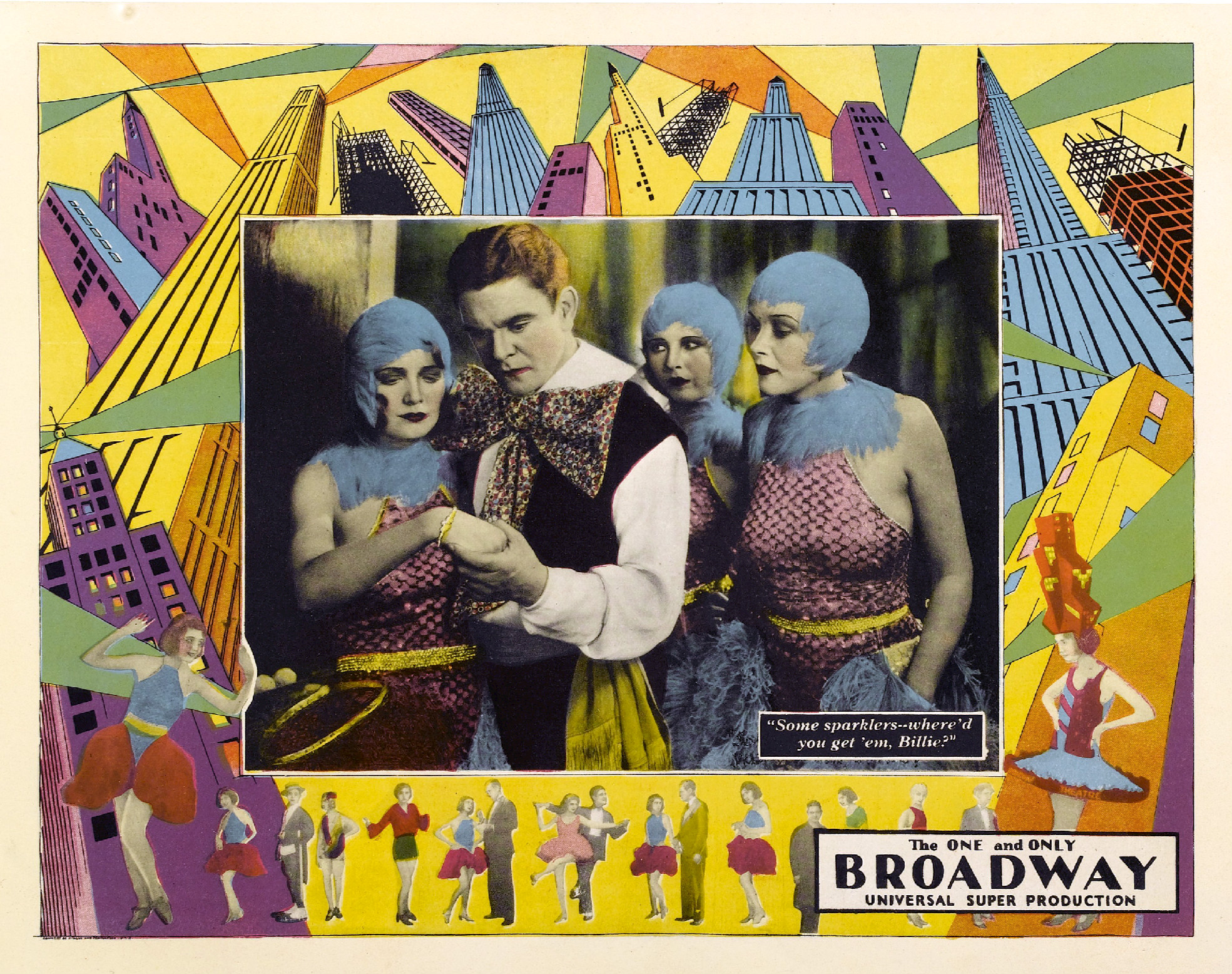
- Roy (Glenn Tryon) questions Billie (Merna Kennedy) about the bracelet she is wearing in Broadway
- Directed by: Paul Fejos
- Screenplay by: Charles Furthman; Edward T. Lowe Jr.; Tom Reed (titles)
- Based on: Broadway by Philip Dunning and George Abbott
- Produced by: Carl Laemmle Jr.
- Starring: Glenn Tryon; Evelyn Brent
- Cinematography: Hal Mohr
- Edited by: Edward Cahn; Robert Carlisle
- Music by: Howard Jackson (uncredited)
- Distributed by: Universal Studios
- Release date: May 27, 1929 (New York)
- Running time: 107 minutes
- Country: United States
- Language: English

Broadway is a 1929 American musical crime film directed by Paul Fejos from the 1926 play of the same name by George Abbott and Philip Dunning. It stars Glenn Tryon, Evelyn Brent, Paul Porcasi, Robert Ellis, Merna Kennedy, and Thomas E. Jackson.

This was Universal's first talking picture with Technicolor sequences. The film was released by the Criterion Collection on Blu-ray and DVD in 2012, with Paul Fejo's Lonesome.

== Plot ==
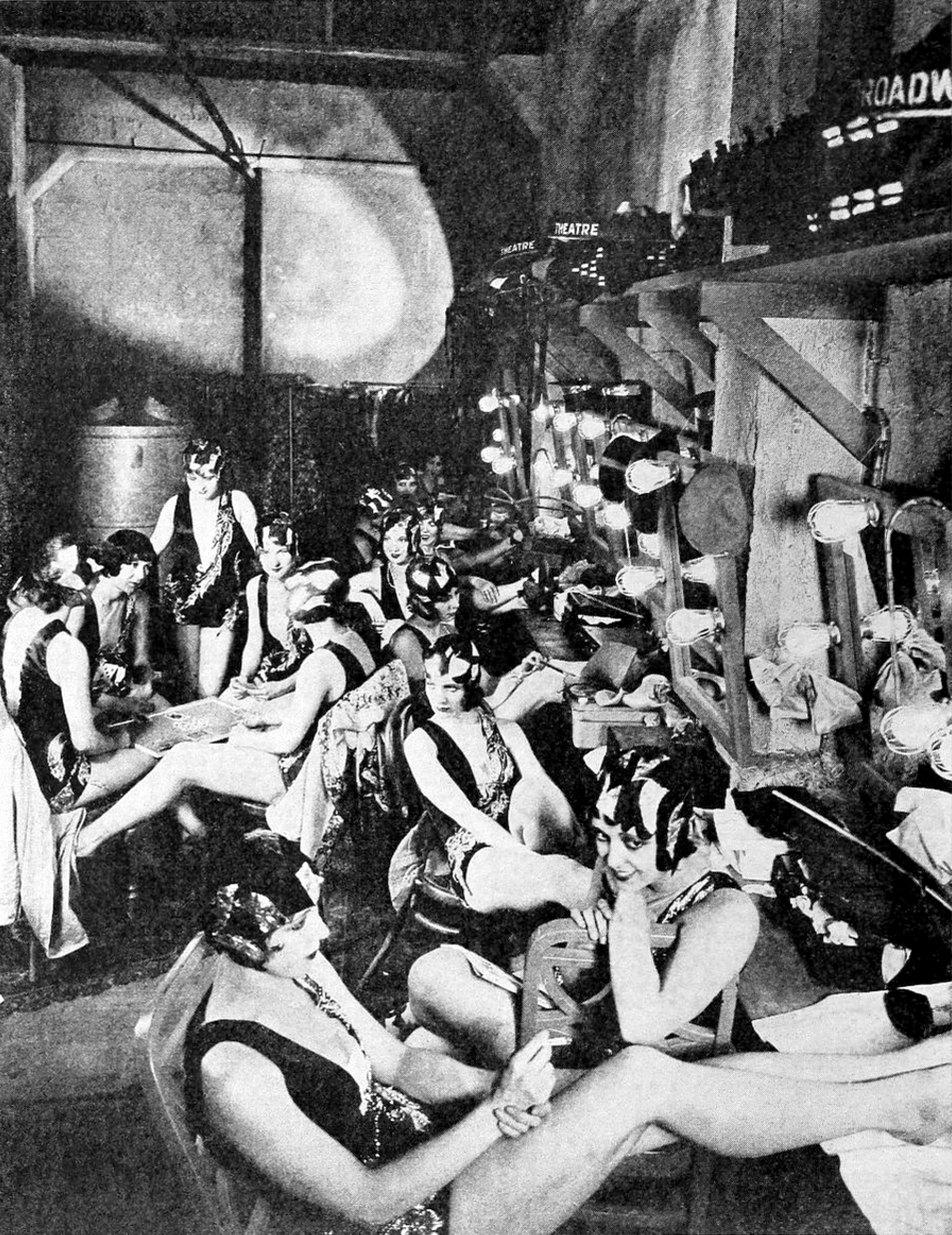
The Paradise Night Club dressing room in Broadway

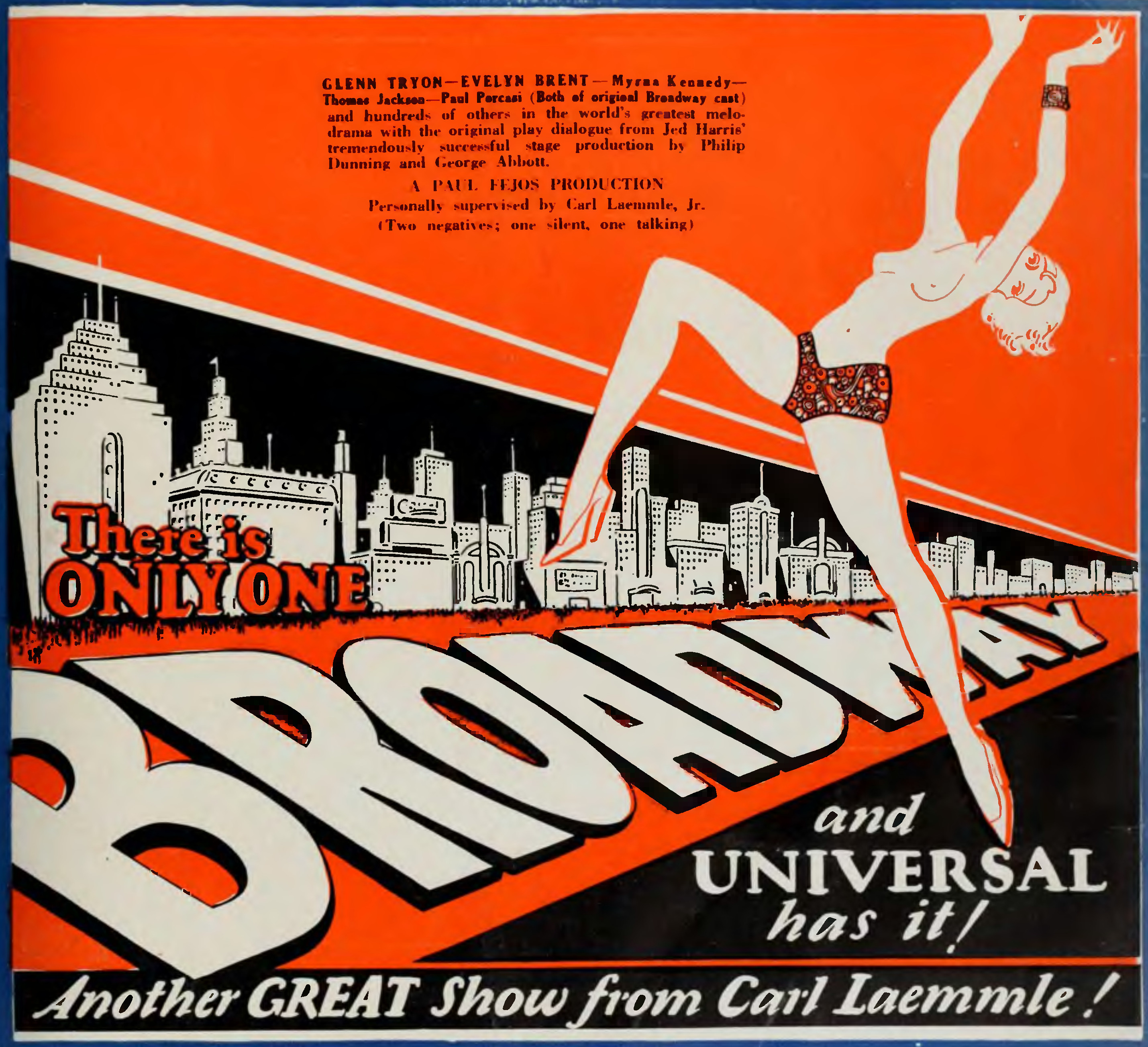
Broadway ad from The Film Daily, 1929

Broadway (1929)

Roy Lane and Billie Moore, entertainers at the Paradise Nightclub, are in love and are rehearsing an act together. Late to work one evening, Billie is saved from dismissal by Nick Verdis, the club proprietor, through the intervention of Steve Crandall, a bootlegger, who desires a liaison with the girl. "Scar" Edwards, robbed of a truckload of contraband liquor by Steve's gang, arrives at the club for a showdown with Steve and is shot in the back. Steve gives Billie a bracelet to forget that she has seen him helping a "drunk" from the club. Though Roy is arrested by Dan McCorn, he is later released on Billie's testimony. Nick is murdered by Steve. Billie witnesses the killing, but keeps quiet about the dirty business until she finds out Steve's next target is Roy. Billie is determined to tell her story to the police before Roy winds up dead, but Steve is not about to let that happen and kidnaps her. Steve, in his car, is fired at from a taxi, and overheard by Pearl, he confesses to killing Edwards. Pearl confronts Steve in Nick's office and kills him; and McCorn, finding Steve's body, insists that he committed suicide, exonerating Pearl and leaving Roy and Billie to the success of their act.

== Cast ==
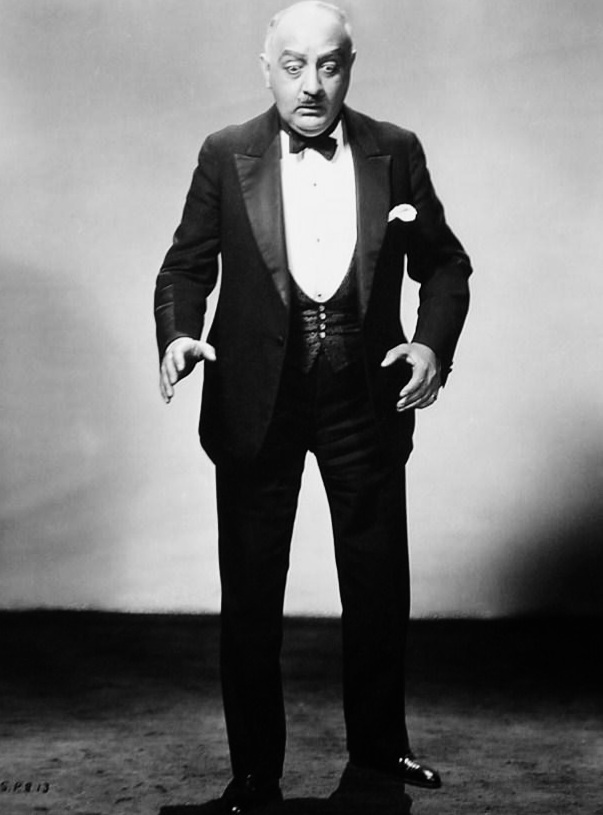
Paul Porcasi reprised his stage role as nightclub operator Nick Verdis in the motion picture version of Broadway

- Glenn Tryon as Roy Lane
- Evelyn Brent as Pearl
- Merna Kennedy as Billie Moore
- Thomas E. Jackson as Dan McCorn
- Robert Ellis as Steve Crandall
- Otis Harlan as 'Porky' Thompson
- Paul Porcasi as Nick Verdis
- Marion Lord as Lil Rice
- Fritz Feld as Mose Levett
- Leslie Fenton as 'Scar' Edwards
- Arthur Housman as Dolphin
- George Davis as Joe
- Betty Francisco as Mazie
- Edythe Flynn as Ruby
- Florence Dudley as Ann

== Production ==
Director Fejos designed the camera crane specifically for use on this film, allowing unusually fluid movement and access to nearly every conceivable angle. It could travel at 600 ft (180 m) per minute. It enlivened the visual style of this film and others that followed.

== Preservation ==
Both the silent version and the talking version of Broadway are extant, but the surviving talking version is incomplete. The color sequence at the end survives in color and in sound but the sound survives separately from the picture. The surviving color footage is from the silent version and has been synchronized to the surviving disc audio.

== Home media ==
In 2012, the sound version of Broadway was reconstructed by The Criterion Collection and included as an extra feature on the DVD and Blu-ray release of Paul Fejos' 1928 film, Lonesome.
