= Otto Matieson =

Danish actor (1893–1932)

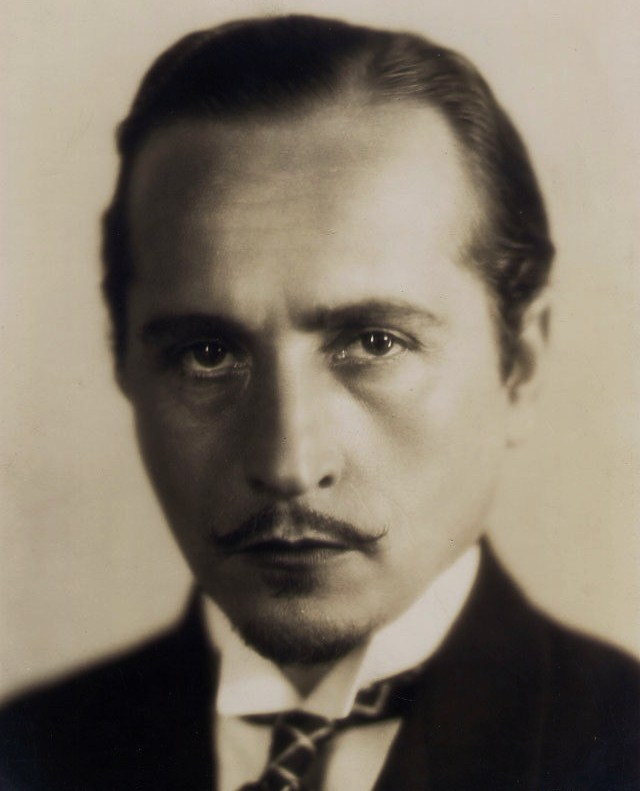
- Matieson in The Woman from Moscow (1928)
- Born: 27 March 1893; Copenhagen, Denmark
- Died: 19 February 1932 (aged 38); Safford, Arizona, U.S.
- Occupation: Actor
- Years active: 1920-1931
- Spouse: Isabel La Mal (?-1932) (his death)

Otto Matieson, born Otto Matiesen, (27 March 1893 – 19 February 1932) was a Danish actor of the silent era. He appeared in 45 films between 1920 and 1931. He was born in Copenhagen, Denmark, and died in a car accident in Safford, Arizona.

== Filmography ==
- The Golden Trail (1920)
- Scaramouche (1923)
- The Dangerous Maid (1923)
- Boston Blackie (1923)
- Revelation (1924)
- Captain Blood (1924)
- The Folly of Vanity (1924)
- The Salvation Hunters (1925)
- The Happy Warrior (1925)
- Morals for Men (1925)
- Parisian Love (1925)
- Bride of the Storm (1926)
- Yellow Fingers (1926)
- Whispering Wires (1926)
- The Silver Treasure (1926)
- Christine of the Big Tops (1926)
- While London Sleeps (1926)
- The Beloved Rogue (1927)
- Old San Francisco (1927)
- Surrender (1927)
- The Last Moment (1928)
- The Scarlet Lady (1928)
- The Woman from Moscow (1928)
- Behind Closed Doors (1929)
- The Show of Shows (1929)
- Prisoners (1929)
- General Crack (1929)
- Golden Dawn (1930)
- Conspiracy (1930)
- A Soldier's Plaything (1930)
- Beau Ideal (1931)
- The Maltese Falcon (1931)
- Men of the Sky (1931)
