= Lord Arthur Savile's Crime (1922 film) =

1922 film

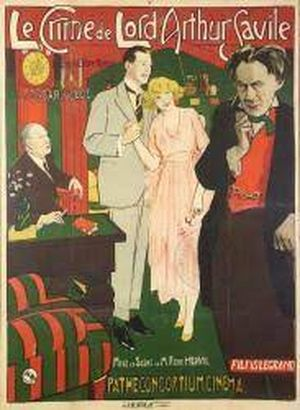
- Directed by: René Hervil
- Written by: René Hervil; André Legrand
- Based on: Lord Arthur Savile's Crime by Oscar Wilde
- Produced by: André Legrand
- Starring: Cecil Mannering; André Dubosc; André Nox
- Cinematography: Amédée Morrin
- Production company: Films André Legrand
- Distributed by: Pathé Consortium Cinéma
- Release date: 3 March 1922
- Running time: 89 minutes
- Country: France
- Languages: Silent; French intertitles

Lord Arthur Savile's Crime (French: Le crime de Lord Arthur Savile) is a 1922 French silent mystery crime film directed by René Hervil and starring Cecil Mannering, André Dubosc and André Nox. It is based on Oscar Wilde's 1887 short story Lord Arthur Savile's Crime.

== Cast ==
- Cecil Mannering as Lord Arthur Savile
- André Dubosc as Merton
- André Nox as Podgers
- Monique Chrysès as Lady Windermere
- Mlle Barral
- Jules de Spoly
- Catherine Fonteney
- Violette Jyl
- Olive Sloane

== Bibliography ==
- Goble, Alan. The Complete Index to Literary Sources in Film. Walter de Gruyter, 1999.
- Rège, Philippe. Encyclopedia of French Film Directors, Volume 1. Scarecrow Press, 2009.
