= Part-talkie =

Silent film with one or more sound segments added

A part-talkie is a sound film that includes at least some "talking sequences" or sections with audible dialogue. The remainder of the film is provided with a synchronized musical score with sound effects. These films more often than not contain a main theme song that is played during key scenes in the film and is often sung offscreen on the musical soundtrack. During the portion without audible dialogue, speaking parts are presented as intertitles—printed text briefly filling the screen—and the soundtrack is used only to supply musical accompaniment and sound effects.

In the case of feature films made in the United States, nearly all such hybrid films date to the 1927–1929 period of transition from "silents" to full-fledged "talkies" with audible dialog throughout. It took about a year and a half for a transition period for American movie houses to move from almost all silent to almost all equipped for sound. In the interim, studios reacted by improvising four solutions: fast remakes of recent productions, the addition of one or two sound segments spliced into already finished productions, dual sound and silent versions produced simultaneously, and part-talkies.

The famous "first talking picture", The Jazz Singer (1927), starring Al Jolson, is a part-talkie. It features only about fifteen minutes of singing and talking, interspersed throughout the film, while the rest is a synchronized film with intertitles and only a recorded orchestral accompaniment with sound effects.

== History ==
As the financial success of early part-talking feature-length sound films such as The Jazz Singer and The Singing Fool became apparent, producers of silent films which were either in production, or had recently been completed but not yet released, hastened to add or retrofit synchronized dialog segments so that their films could be advertised as "talking pictures" to a newly sound-hungry public. "You will hear the characters speak from the screen!" the ads could truthfully promise, even if all the audible speech was confined to one brief segment in an otherwise mute film.

Due to the excitement of the public over sound film, films that were retrofitted with sound became successful while those that were released silent often failed to make a profit. The sound versions were often criticized by critics. However, box office receipts showed that, for the general public, sound versions were by and large preferred over silent films. The success of the pictures can be gauged by how quickly theme songs from these sound films became best sellers. Seemingly overnight, the top selling records, sheet music, and piano rolls all became songs that were associated with sound films.

Lonesome (1928)

The Paul Fejos film Lonesome (1928) was a hit with the public and the sound version made a profit of $407,923.23 for Universal. The film was nevertheless criticized by some critics who disliked the addition of several minutes of small talk between the lead characters. They argued that these additions caused previously sympathetic audiences to abruptly lower their opinions of the characters' personalities and level of intelligence.

In 1928, Universal Pictures began filming Edna Ferber's novel Show Boat as a silent film. Influenced by the success of the Broadway musical version, sound segments were added midway through production, as was a prologue, to be shown beforehand at every sound-capable theatre, featuring three of the musical's actors singing five songs from the show. The film was released in 1929, and made a handsome profit, with rentals totaling $1,643,000 at the box office.

The first film version of Thornton Wilder's The Bridge of San Luis Rey, also released in 1929, had a few minutes of sound tacked onto what was basically a silent picture.

Douglas Fairbanks' last swashbuckler, The Iron Mask (1929) was based on Dumas's L'homme au masque de fer and featured two short speeches during the prologue and immediately following the intermission, in which Fairbanks' voice was heard from the screen for the first time, but the body of the film had no audible dialog.

In 1930, the Lon Chaney silent film success The Phantom of the Opera, originally released in 1925, was reissued with some newly filmed talking segments. Although the majority of the film was five years old, the reissue was a success. It earned an additional million dollars for Universal. The highest quality known reel of The Phantom of the Opera is a copy of the International Sound Version which was made for foreign markets.

Most copies of silent films that were re-released as part-talkies survive only in sound versions. This was because the silent versions made little or no profit for the studios and the demand was low for these versions which were already perceived as outdated by the public. Many famous silent films, like Lonesome, survive only in their sound versions, which is incidentally what most audiences saw, because the majority of the public had no interest in viewing silent films.

By late 1929, virtually all films in production in the US were "100 percent all talking", although there were rare and sometimes successful exceptions. Charlie Chaplin's Modern Times, released in 1936, is an example of an unusually late part-talkie. The only voices heard in the film are those of the factory foreman, of a salesman making his pitch by means of a phonograph record, and of Chaplin when he sings a gibberish song in a nightclub scene. The soundtrack for the rest of the film is simply an orchestral score accompanying the action, with occasional sound effects.

The film The Artist (2011), winner of the 2012 Academy Award for Best Picture, was promoted as a silent film and the first of its kind to win a major Oscar award since the 1920s, but it was really a part-talkie due to the use of on-screen dialog at the end, audible female laughter in a dream sequence, and the appearance of a song with sung lyrics on the soundtrack.

== See also ==
- Show Boat (1929 film)
- Sound film
- History of film
- List of early Warner Bros. talking features
- List of early sound feature films (1926–1929)
