= Edward T. Lowe Jr. =

American film writer, producer and editor

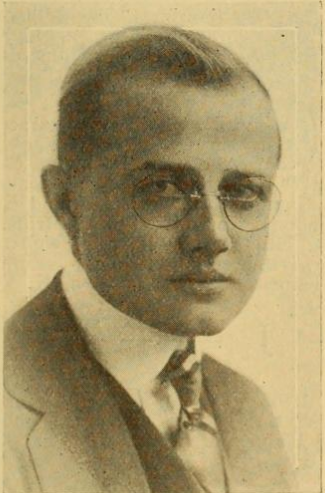
- Edward T. Lowe Jr (1918)
- Born: 29 June 1880; Nashville, Tennessee
- Died: 19 April 1973 (aged 92)
- Other names: E.T. Lowe, Jr., E.C. Lowe, Edmund T. Lowe, Edward Lowe
- Occupations: Screenwriter; Film producer
- Years active: 1913–1947

Edward T. Lowe Jr. (29 June 1880 in Nashville, Tennessee, United States – 19 April 1973) was an American film writer, producer and editor. He wrote 120 films between years 1913–1947, produced 18 films and directed one: The Losing Game (1915).

Edward T. Lowe Jr. was born June 29, 1890, in Nashville, Tennessee. Lowe's first script was written in 1913 and two years later, he directed his first and only film. Following this, he predominantly concerned himself with writing and producing films. In 1913, Lowe worked as the revising editor of screenplays at Essanay Studios.

In 1915, he scripted The Mystery of Silent Death and predominantly focused on mystery films. He also occasionally worked outside the genre, such as when he was signed by Universal in 1929 to work on Broadway (1929). In the talkies period, Lowe would work on The Vampire Bat (1933) and several Charlie Chan films: Charlie Chan in Paris (1935), Charlie Chan in Shanghai (1935) and Charlie Chan at the Race Track (1936). He would also produce, but not write Charlie Chan in Egypt (1935). Lowe also worked on Bulldog Drummond films, such as Bulldog Drummond Escapes (1937), Bulldog Drummond's Revenge (1937), Bulldog Drummond Comes Back (1937), Bulldog Drummond in Africa (1938) and Bulldog Drummond's Secret Police (1939).

At Universal Pictures in the 1940s, he would work on Sherlock Holmes and the Secret Weapon (1943) and House of Frankenstein (1944) and House of Dracula (1945). Lowe died on April 19, 1973.

== Selected filmography ==
- Men Who Have Made Love to Me (1918)
- Toby's Bow (1919)
- Over the Wire (1921)
- Big Game (1921)
- Under Two Flags (1922)
- The Scrapper (1922)
- Ridin' Wild (1922)
- What Wives Want (1923)
- The Prisoner (1923)
- The Hunchback of Notre Dame (1923)
- Red Hot Tires (1925)
- The Teaser (1925)
- The Sap (1926)
- The Man Upstairs (1926)
- State Street Sadie (1928)
- Broadway (1929)
- The Mississippi Gambler (1929)
- Hearts of Humanity (1932)
- The Unwritten Law (1932)
- Shop Angel (1932)
- Alias Mary Smith (1932)
- The Vampire Bat (1933)
- The World Gone Mad (1933)
- Charlie Chan in Egypt (1935)
- Charlie Chan in Shanghai (1935)
- Bulldog Drummond's Revenge (1937)
- Television Spy (1939)
- Parole Fixer (1940)
- The Girl from Alaska (1942)
- A Man's World (1942)
- House of Frankenstein (1944)
- House of Dracula (1945)
- Rough, Tough and Ready (1945)
