= Joseph Calleia =

American actor and singer (1897–1975)

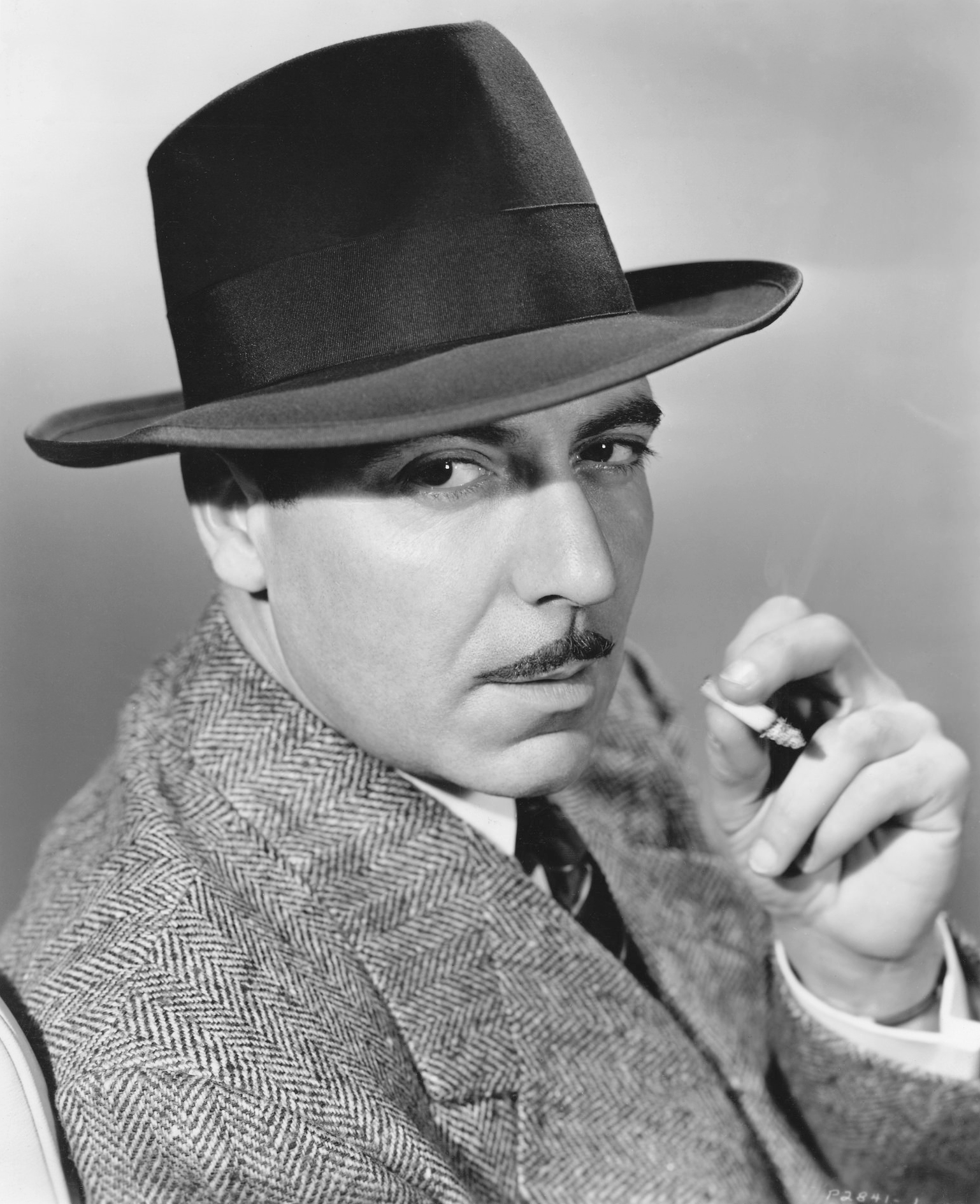
- Joseph Calleia in 1942
- Born: Joseph Alexander Caesar Herstall Vincent Calleja; August 4, 1897; Notabile, Crown Colony of Malta
- Died: October 31, 1975 (aged 78); Sliema, Malta
- Other names: Joseph Spurin; Joseph Spurin-Calleia; Joseph Spurin Calleja
- Occupations: Actor; singer
- Years active: 1918–1963
- Spouse: Eleanor Vassallo (married 1929–1967)

Joseph Calleia (/kəˈleɪə/ kə-LAY-ə; born Joseph Alexander Caesar Herstall Vincent Calleja, August 4, 1897 – October 31, 1975) was a Maltese-born American actor and singer on the stage and in films, radio and television. After serving in the British Transport Service during World War I, he travelled to the United States and began his career on the stage, initially in musical comedy, but later in original Broadway productions such as Broadway (1926), The Front Page (1928), The Last Mile (1930), and Grand Hotel (1930). Calleia became a star with the play Small Miracle (1934), his first real role as a villain, and he was put under contract by Metro-Goldwyn-Mayer.

Calleia excelled as the villain in Hollywood films, but he fought against typecasting and created a succession of darkly mysterious characters edged with humor in films such as Algiers (1938), Five Came Back (1939), Golden Boy (1939), The Glass Key (1942) and Gilda (1946). During World War II, Calleia led the Malta War Relief organization in the United States, and toured for the USO and the Hollywood Victory Committee. After the war, he continued to work steadily in motion pictures and television, and starred in the 1948 London stage premiere of Arthur Miller's Tony Award-winning play All My Sons. Calleia's performance in Orson Welles's 1958 film Touch of Evil is regarded as one of the best in his career.

== Early life ==
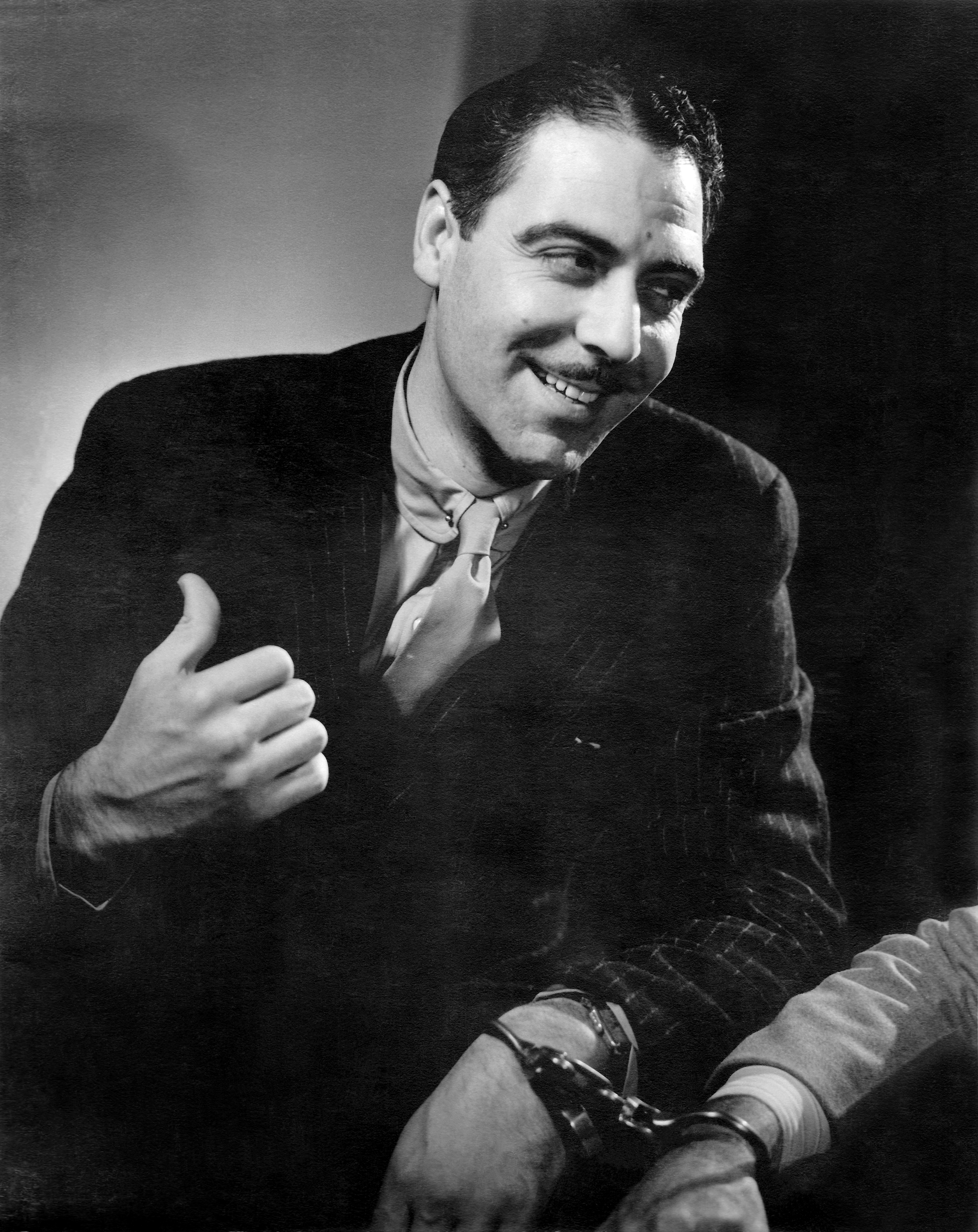
Calleia in the Broadway stage production Small Miracle (1934–1935)

Joseph Alexander Caesar Herstall Vincent Calleja (Note: Calleia's surname is pronounced "cal-ay-a", with the emphasis on the second syllable.) was born on August 4, 1897, in Notabile (now called Mdina), in the administrative area of Saqqajja, (Note: Saqqajja is an administrative area of Mdina but outside the walled city. It is culturally considered part of both Rabat and Mdina. Saqqajja was historically part of Rabat but in recent history is officially part of Mdina; see also Melite (ancient city).) in the Crown Colony of Malta. His parents were Pasquale and Eleonore Calleja; his father was an architect. Calleia studied at St. Julian's and St. Aloysius Colleges. At age 12, he used the English pound given to him for Christmas to buy two dozen harmonicas, and organized a local band whose performances were soon netting £100 a week. Sent by his father to London to study engineering, Calleia employed his good tenor voice in music halls, performing ballads of the Scottish Highlands in traditional dress. He worked as Joseph Spurin, using his mother's maiden name due to his father's disapproval.

In 1914 Calleia joined the British Transport Service. After cruising the world for two and a half years, his ship was torpedoed in the English Channel. Hospitalized for three months, Calleia was awarded a campaign medal and honorably discharged. He traveled to the United States in 1917. Unemployed, he sang for the Red Cross and armed services, and volunteered for the Tank Corps.

Calleia began his stage career on Armistice Day. After World War I, he had only limited success in vaudeville. He earned his living stoking the furnace at a department store, and got a night job washing and repairing New York City streetcars. By day, he haunted theatrical booking offices. The Henry W. Savage agency sent Calleia to Denver, where he made his stage debut singing in the chorus of Jerome Kern's musical comedy Have a Heart. The following season, he had a bit part in Pietro (1920), an Otis Skinner vehicle that played six weeks on Broadway and 40 weeks on tour. Calleia supplemented his salary by working as assistant stage manager and repairing trunks at $3 each.

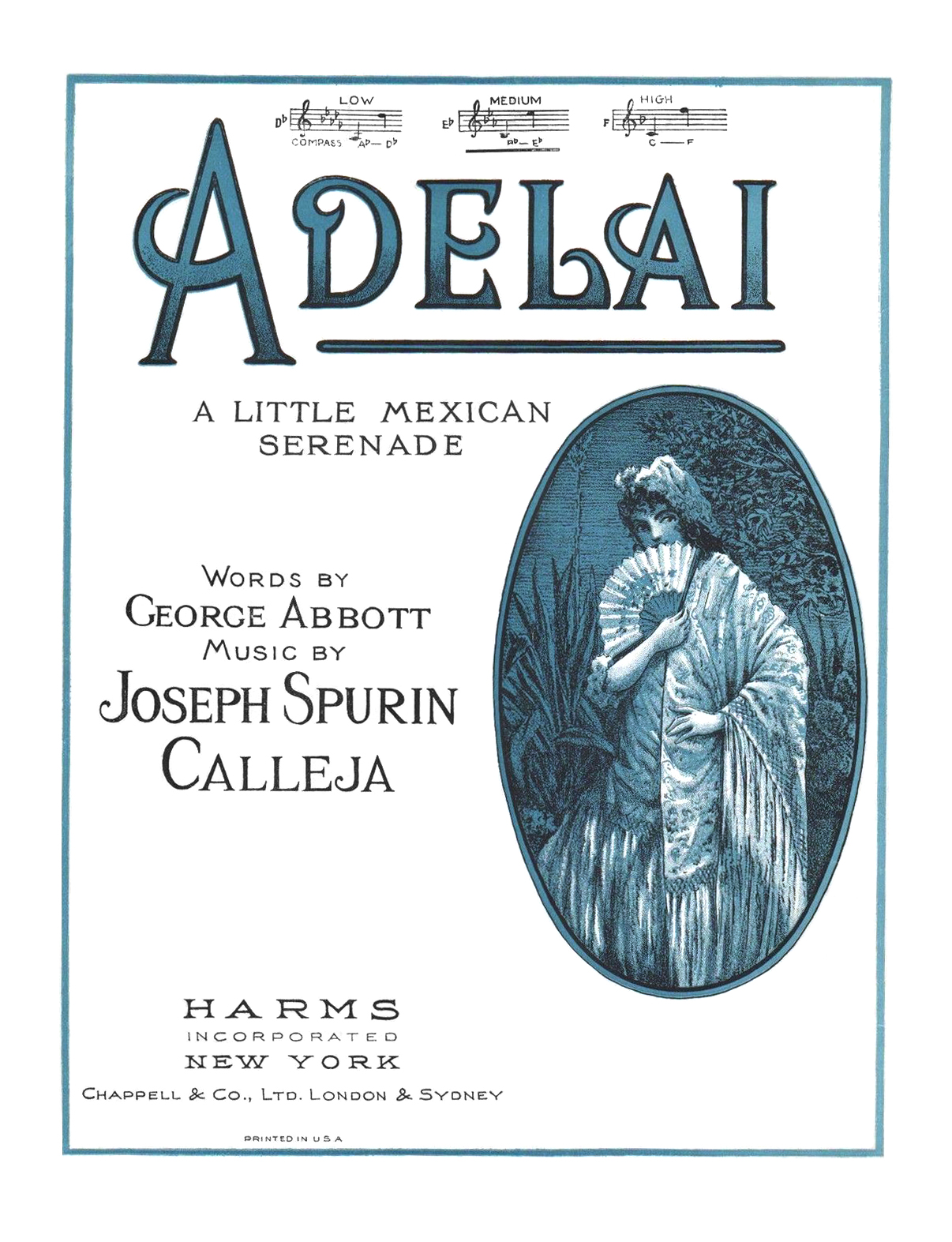

Calleia's first speaking role on the stage was in The Broken Wing (1920), a Broadway comedy featuring George Abbott and Louis Wolheim. He understudied all of the parts and appeared as a Mexican peon who played the guitar and sang a song called "Adelai". Calleia composed the tune, and asked Abbott to write the lyrics; the song was published and eventually brought each of them royalties of as much as $2,000 a year. The Broken Wing was a hit, and after the play's New York run, Calleia and Thurston Hall were carried over in a London production.

After four months, the show closed, and Calleia visited Malta, where he and his father reconciled. At his father's request he began using his real surname, and he was billed as Joseph Spurin-Calleia.

On February 14, 1925, Calleia made his concert debut at Town Hall in New York City, accompanied by pianist Ferdinand Greenwald. "He proved to be the possessor of an agreeable high voice, which he used with much skill in Italian airs," wrote New York Times music critic Olin Downes, "including that of Rodolfo from Puccini's La Boheme and others from Verdi's Trovatore and Rigoletto." In recital at New York's Steinway Hall on February 21, 1926, Calleia "displayed a voice of pleasant and attractive timbre" in a program that included works by Scarlatti, Paisiello, Schumann, Gounod and Leoncavallo, as well as two of his own compositions.

Calleia was cast as the Spanish ambassador in the Broadway production of Princess Flavia (1925), Sigmund Romberg's musical adaptation of The Prisoner of Zenda. While he was waiting for the elaborate production to be mounted, he sold pianos with such success that the store owner offered him a store of his own if he would stay.

== Stage career ==
In 1926, Calleia landed his first prominent stage role, in George Abbott and Philip Dunning's smash hit Broadway. He played a shuffling, coin-jingling waiter in the melodrama that New York Times critic Brooks Atkinson later called a "noisy, bustling cyclorama of backstage life [that] remains a landmark in the American theater." Calleia also acted as the company's stage manager and, working for producer Jed Harris, he supervised some 10 duplicate productions of Broadway in the U.S. and abroad.

A succession of acclaimed performances in successful Broadway plays followed, including as a shiftless newspaper reporter in The Front Page (1928), a convicted murderer in The Last Mile (1930), and the sinister chauffeur in Grand Hotel (1930). Calleia became a star with Small Miracle (1934), a Broadway production described by The New Yorker as "a very satisfactory melodrama with Joseph Spurin-Calleia as the pleasantest murderer you ever saw."

Public Hero No. 1 trailer (1935)

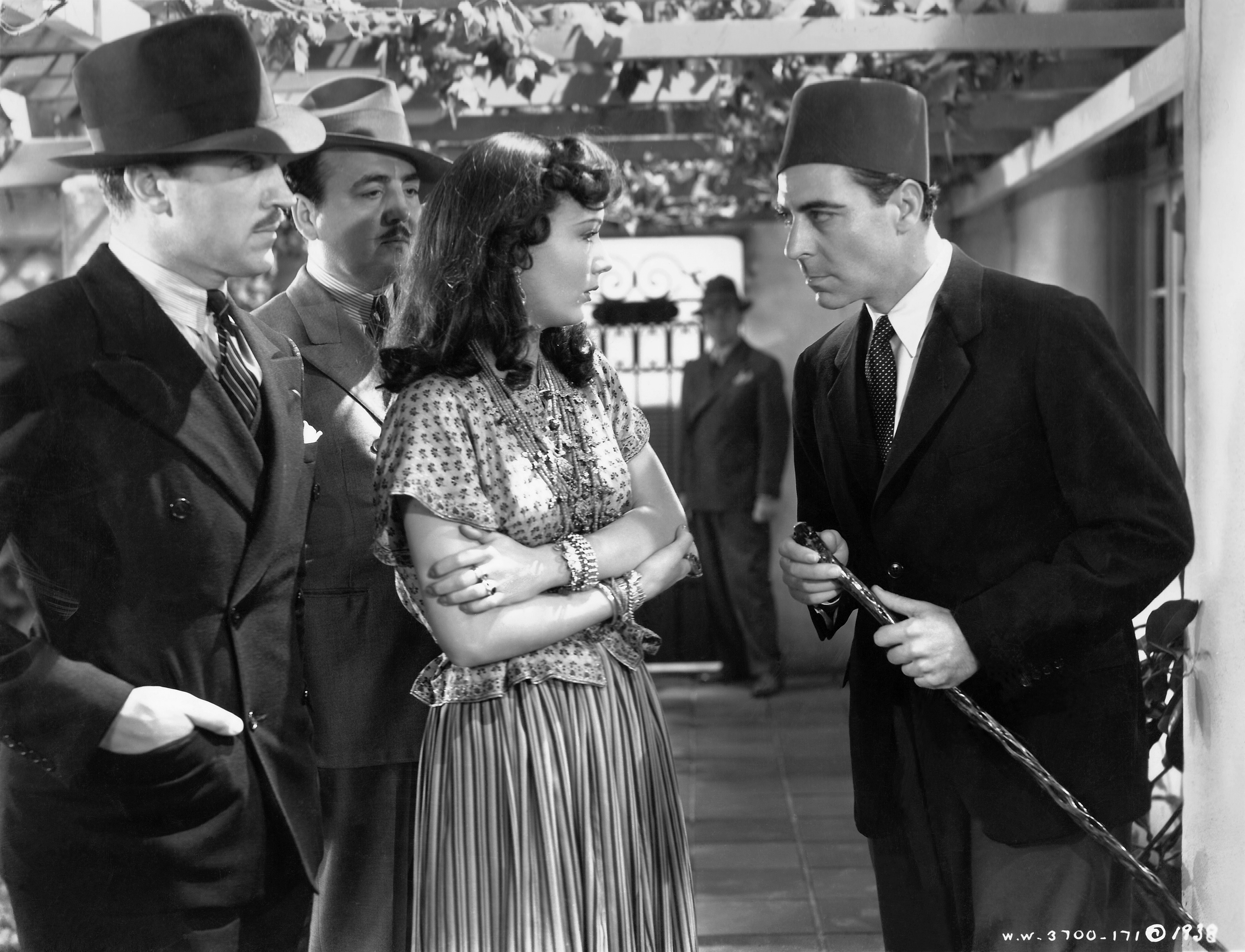
Calleia received the 1938 National Board of Review Award for his performance as Inspector Slimane in Algiers (1938).

"What an actor—Joseph Calleia", said Orson Welles, who directed and performed with Calleia in Touch of Evil (1958):

I fell in love with him as a ten-year-old boy. I saw him in a play in New York (Note: The play, titled Small Miracle, ran on Broadway in 1934–35 and was filmed in 1935 as Four Hours to Kill!, starring Richard Barthelmess.) ... a very well-staged melodrama which was an enormous hit for about a year—it was made as a movie later with somebody else. He had the leading role, and I never forgot him. And through the years I'd seen him in movies—little things. And I could never forget that performance of his. He's always played very stereotyped parts in pictures but is one of the best actors I've ever known. I have such respect for him. You play next to him and you just feel the thing that you do with a big actor—this dynamo going on.

Naming the theatre's villain of the year for 1934, nationally syndicated columnist Paul Harrison of the Newspaper Enterprise Association selected "Joseph Spurin-Calleia, whose gangster role in Small Miracle provided one of the finest of all performances on Broadway."

== Film career ==
Calleia had his first real role as a villain in Small Miracle, and his success in the play was responsible for his move to Hollywood. Calleia's contract with Metro-Goldwyn-Mayer permitted him a hiatus of six months a year, to continue his stage work. He was not new to motion pictures—he had made three feature films on the East Coast—but when MGM put Calleia under contract, they promoted his first film, Public Hero No. 1 (1935), as his screen debut. Calleia's portrayal of the gunman was listed by The New York Times film critic Andre Sennwald as one of the year's 10 best male performances.

Calleia excelled as the bad guy in films, but he wanted to create characters with some sympathy. "I'd like to get away from straight villain roles," he said in a 1936 interview. "But I have no wish to be a hero. I enjoy roles where I get slapped around a bit. It's far more stimulating to play a character that isn't all one thing—not all bad and not all good." He created a series of darkly mysterious characters edged with humor in films including Algiers (1938), Five Came Back (1939), Golden Boy (1939), The Glass Key (1942) and Gilda (1946).

In June 1935, Calleia was announced to star as Joaquin Murrieta in I Am Joaquin (later titled Robin Hood of El Dorado), a film for which he had written the screenplay. MGM replaced him with Warner Baxter, ostensibly because Calleia was too old, although Baxter was six years older. Calleia did star in Man of the People (1937), a political drama about a young lawyer fighting corporate racketeers.

Calleia continued to battle typecasting, turning down well-paying villainous roles to develop more complex characters. His performance as Police Inspector Slimane in Walter Wanger's Algiers (1938) was recognized by the National Board of Review. Working with director John Farrow at RKO Pictures in 1939, he created a fine character study as the condemned anarchist in Five Came Back, and a heroic priest in Full Confession. Calleia was announced to star as Father Damien in an RKO picture to be written and directed by Farrow, but the project was not realized.

Calleia as Pete Menzies in Orson Welles's Touch of Evil (1958), considered to be one of the best performances of his career

Calleia became a naturalized American citizen in November 1941. During World War II, Calleia led the Malta War Relief organization in the United States. The house where he was born was destroyed in 1942; his family took refuge underground in ancient catacombs during the near-constant aerial bombing of Malta by the Axis powers that lasted for more than two years. Under the auspices of the Motion Picture Division of USO Camp Shows, he made personal appearances at American military facilities in 1943. He also accepted an invitation from the Hollywood Victory Committee to make a tour of military camps in North Africa, particularly because the tentative itinerary included Malta. On the 20,000-mile (32,000 km) trip, Calleia and his small troupe entertained service personnel in Natal, Dakar, along the coast to Casablanca and across to Tunis, then went to Malta, which Calleia had not visited since 1922. They gave two shows per day and visited all of the hospitals at each stop; and they presented six shows in Malta as part of the exchange program between American and British entertainment units. (Note: Calleia's USO troupe consisted of singer Marcia Rice, accordionist Bonnie Brooks, and master of ceremonies Gary Webb. Calleia sang, performed a scene from Small Miracle—"and I closed the show with a burlesque striptease. That was the toughest part of the show. It gets awful cold in North Africa.")

In addition to working steadily in motion pictures for another 20 years, Calleia also starred in the 1948 London stage premiere of Arthur Miller's Tony Award-winning play All My Sons, receiving unanimous critical acclaim. His performance in Touch of Evil (1958)—as Pete Menzies, longtime partner of corrupt Police Captain Hank Quinlan (Orson Welles)—is regarded as one of the best of his career.

"It is not rare in Welles's films for one actor to break away from the overall gesture of the film to embody a distilled human truth," wrote Welles biographer Simon Callow. "In Touch of Evil there are two actors who do this—Dietrich and Joseph Calleia, playing Quinlan's deceived colleague, Menzies. Calleia's haunted features figure more and more prominently on screen as the truth about Quinlan increasingly dawns on him, along with the knowledge that he must betray him. ... Calleia's abundant inner life casts a growing spell over the film as it comes to its climax, bringing to vividly personal life Welles's sempiternal subject: betrayal."

== Later life ==
Calleia retired in 1963 to Sliema, Malta. His wife, Eleanor Vassallo Calleia, whom he had married in 1929, died there in 1967. (Note: Joseph Calleia and Eleanor Vassallo (born August 19, 1898, Brooklyn, New York) were married December 29, 1929, at Long Island, New York. She died in Sliema on December 17, 1967.) Calleia died on October 31, 1975, aged 78, in St. Julian's.

== Theatre credits ==
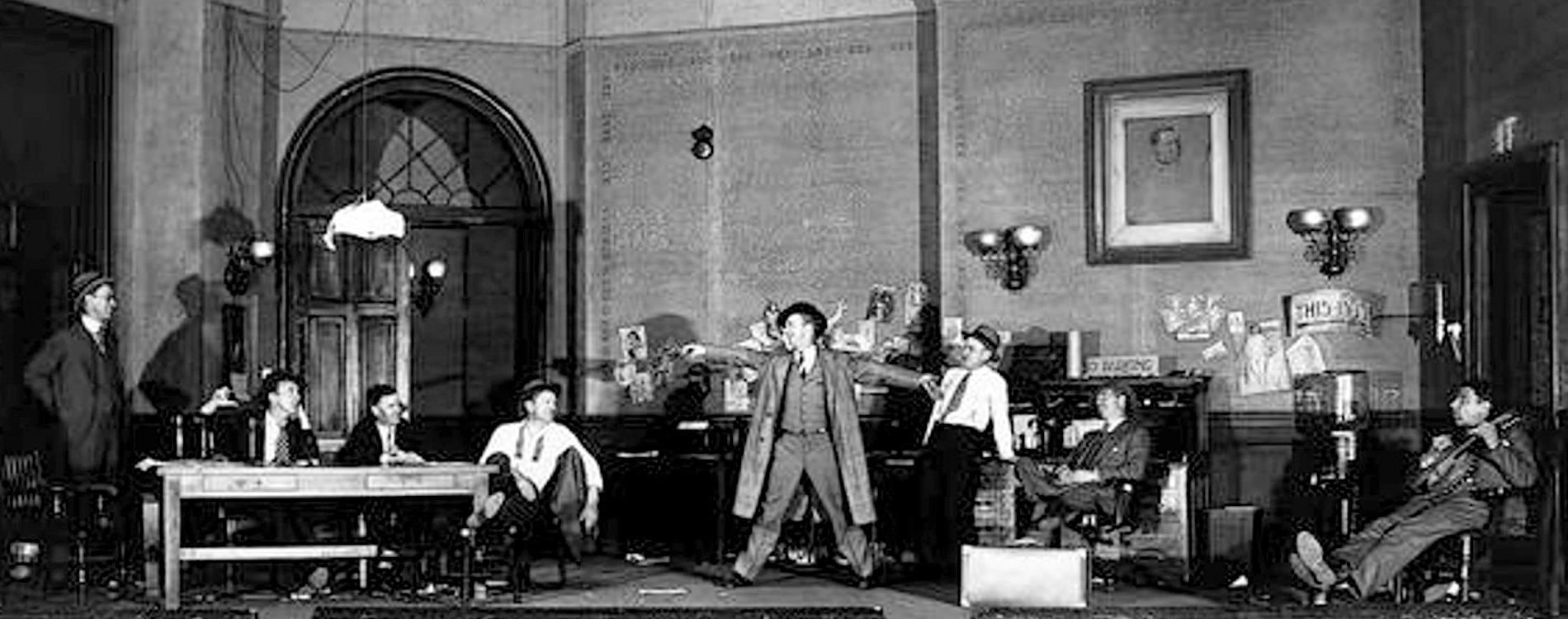
Calleia (far right) as the lazy, banjo-playing reporter Kruger in the original Broadway production of The Front Page (1928)

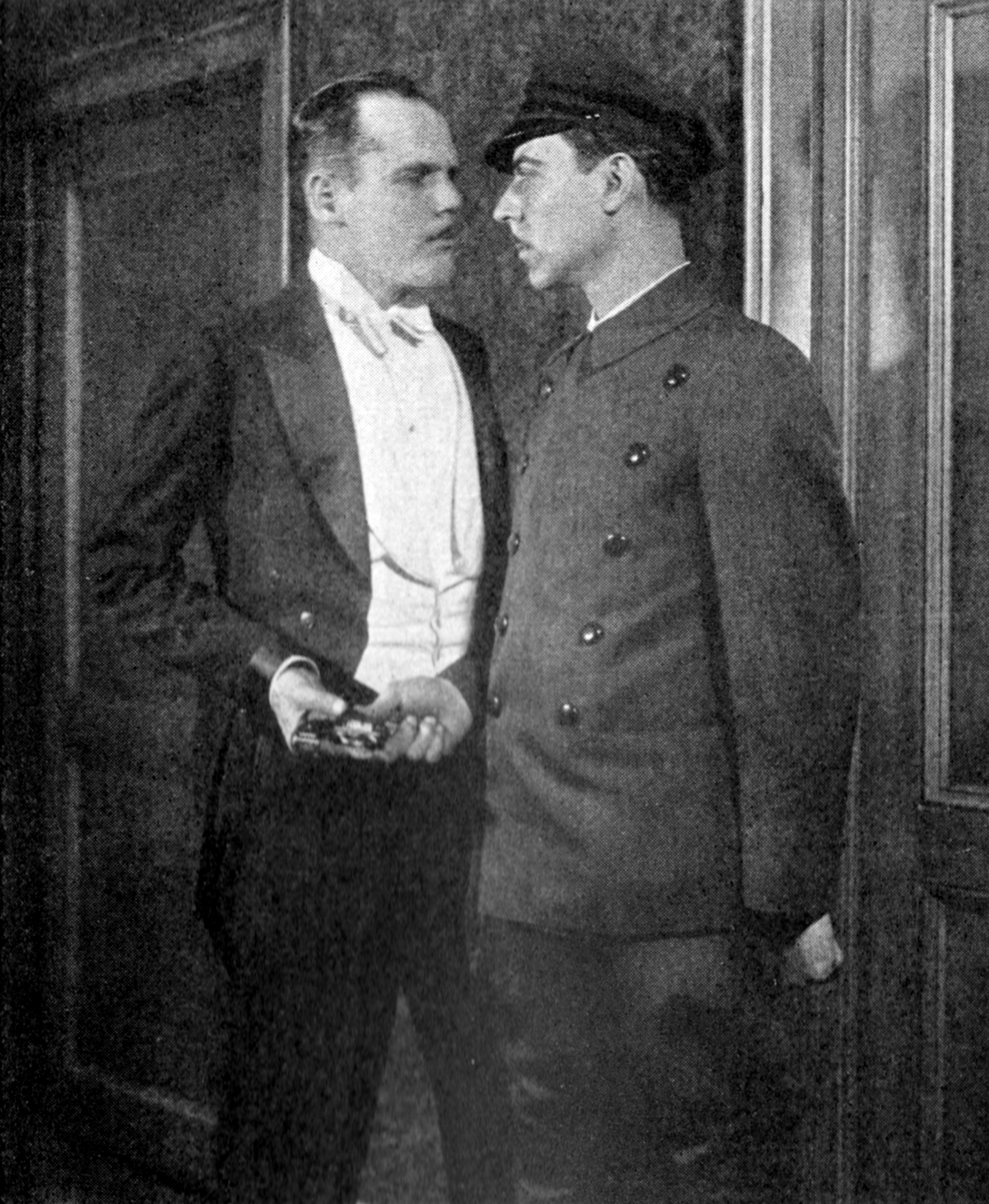
Calleia (right) as the chauffeur who ensures that Baron von Geigern (Henry Hull) does not double-cross their gang of thieves in the original Broadway production of Grand Hotel (1930)

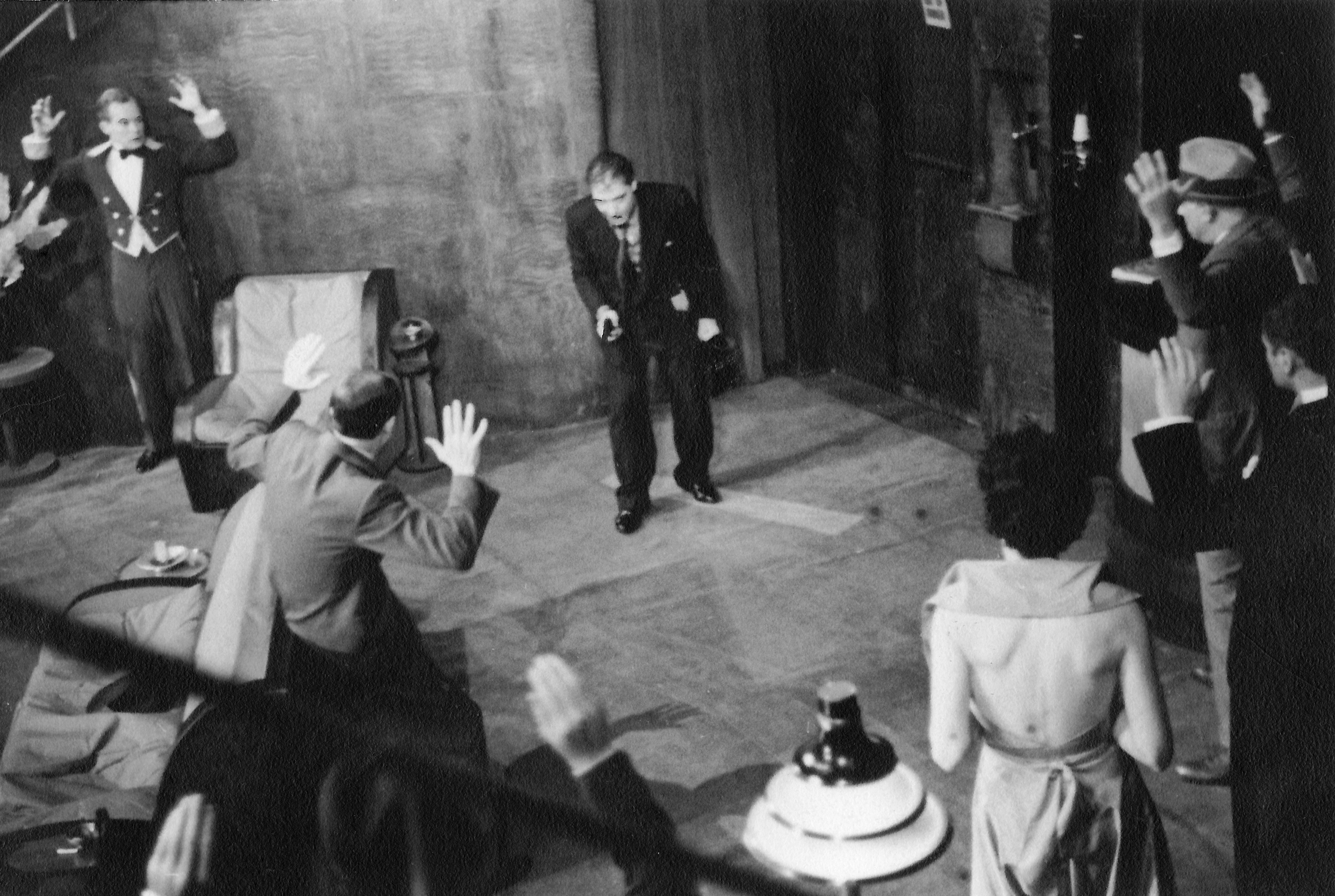
Calleia in the climax of the Broadway production of Small Miracle, which made him a star (1934)

Poster for the London premiere of Arthur Miller's All My Sons, which featured Calleia in a rare starring role that brought him unanimous critical acclaim (1948)

Date	Title	Role	Notes
1919	Have a Heart (Note: Written by Guy Bolton and P. G. Wodehouse with music by Jerome Kern, Have a Heart was first produced on Broadway in 1917 by Harry W. Savage.)	Chorus member	Joins touring company in Denver
January 19 – March 1, 1920	Pietro	Miguel	Criterion Theatre, New York
1920	Pietro	Miguel	Also assistant stage manager 40-week national tour
November 29, 1920 – April 1, 1921	The Broken Wing	Basilio	48th Street Theatre, New York
August 15 – November 18, 1922	The Broken Wing	Basilio	Duke of York's Theatre, London
April 9 – June 1, 1923	Zander the Great	Juan	Empire Theatre, New York
November 2, 1925 – March 13, 1926	Princess Flavia	Senor Poncho, Wurfner	Century Theatre and (from February 1) Shubert Theatre, New York
September 16, 1926 – February 11, 1928	Broadway	Joe	Broadhurst Theatre, New York; Also stage manager; also in charge of some ten duplicate productions of the play in the U.S. and abroad
August 14, 1928 – April 13, 1929	The Front Page	Kruger, Journal of Commerce	Times Square Theatre, New York
February 13 – October 1, 1930	The Last Mile	Tom D'Amoro	Sam H. Harris Theatre, New York
November 13, 1930 – December 5, 1931	Grand Hotel	Chauffeur	Also general stage manager National Theatre, New York
September 14 – December 3, 1932	Clear All Wires	—	Stage manager Times Square Theatre, New York
December 23, 1932 – February 1, 1933	Honeymoon	Nicola	Little Theatre, New York
October 17 – December 30, 1933	Ten Minute Alibi	Hunter	Ethel Barrymore Theatre, New York
July 9, 1934	The Bride of Torozko		Westport Country Playhouse, Westport, Connecticut
September 26, 1934 – January 5, 1935	Small Miracle	Tony Mako	John Golden Theatre and (from November 11) 48th Street Theatre, New York
February 7 – 1935	Small Miracle	Tony Mako	El Capitan Theatre, Los Angeles, produced by Henry Duffy with original cast members Robert Middlemass and Joseph King
May 11 – September 18, 1948	All My Sons	Joe Keller	Lyric Theatre and (from June 15) Globe Theatre, London, with Margalo Gillmore
January 1955	All My Sons	Joe Keller	Alley Theatre, Houston

== Filmography ==
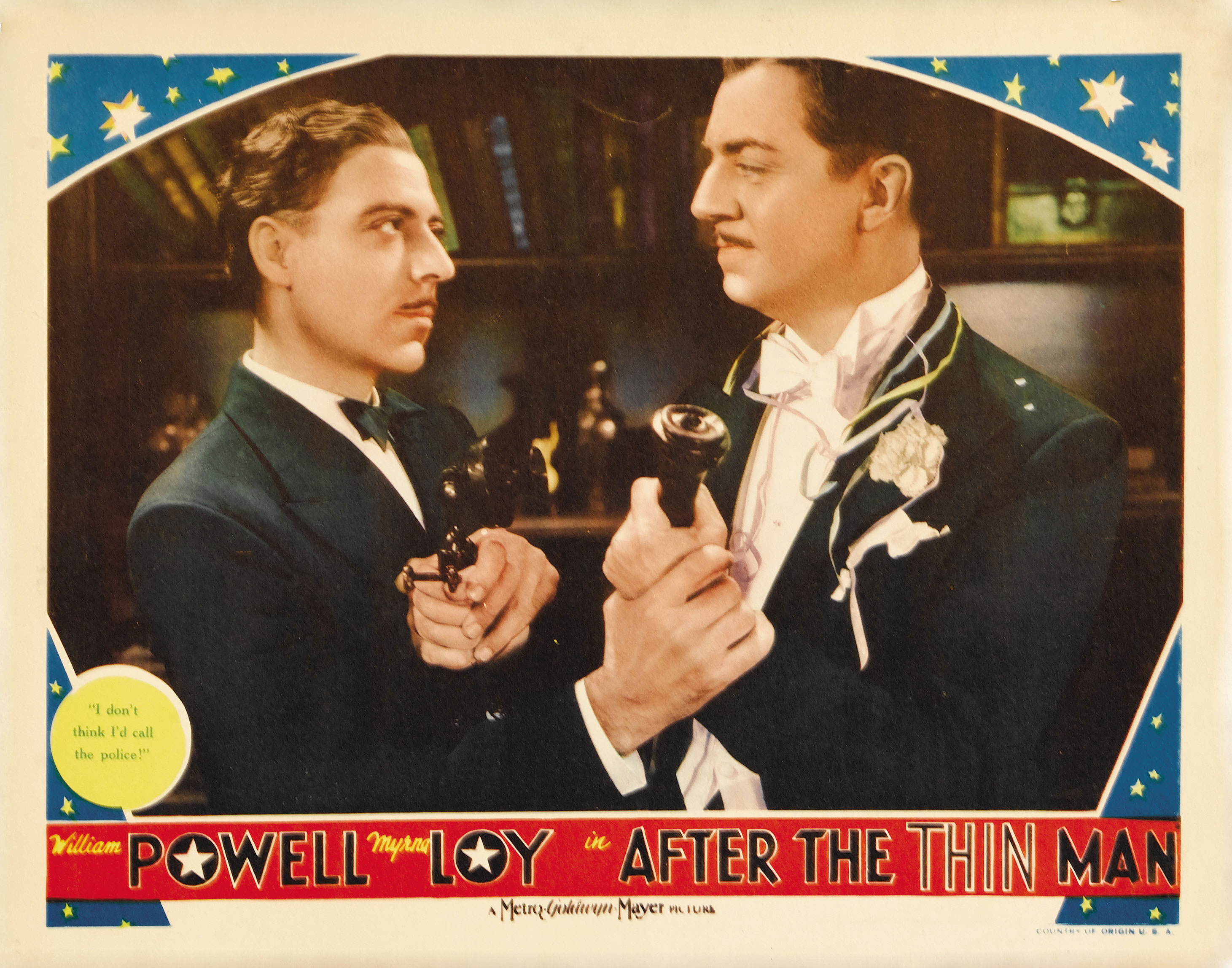
Calleia and William Powell in After the Thin Man (1936)

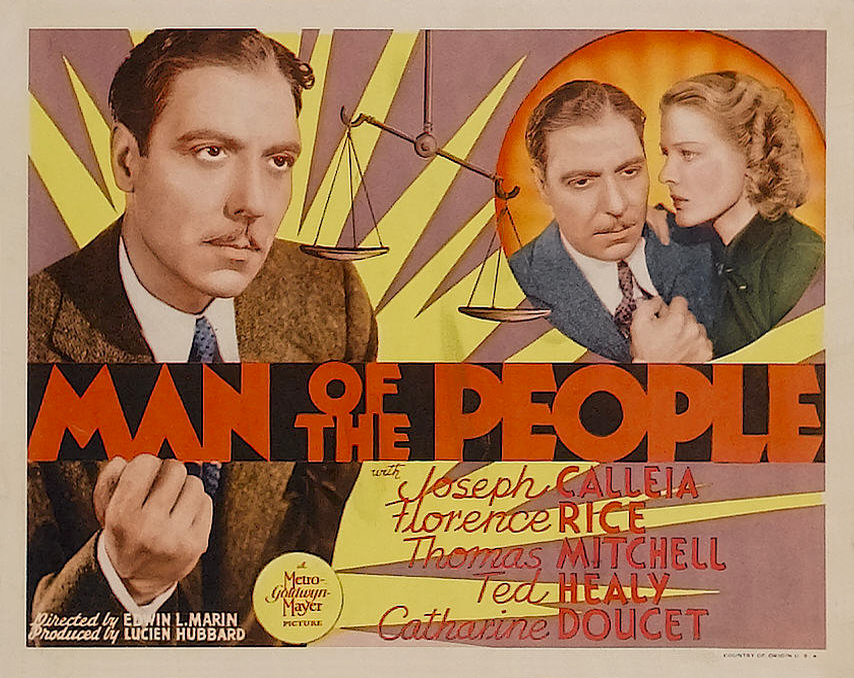
Calleia starring in Man of the People (1937)

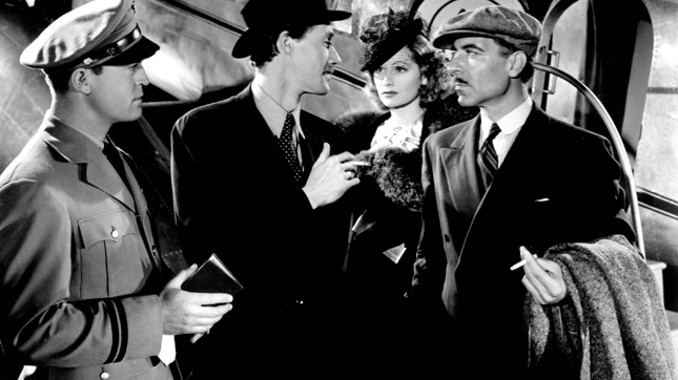
Chester Morris, John Carradine, Lucille Ball and Calleia in Five Came Back (1939)

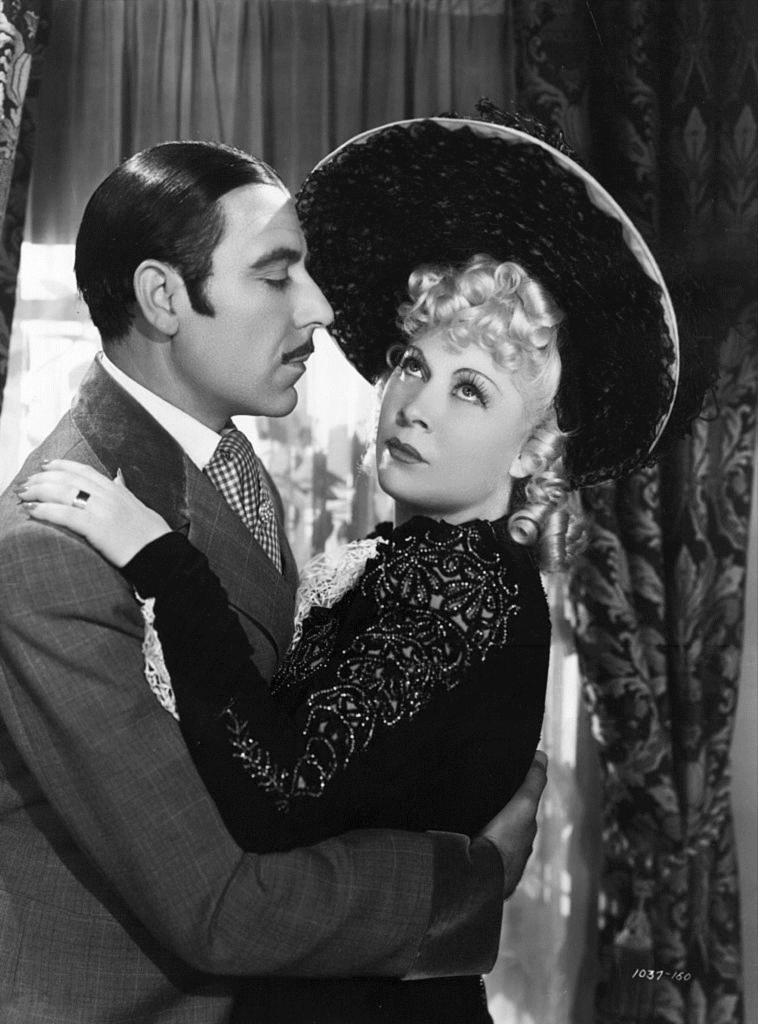
Calleia and Mae West in My Little Chickadee (1940)

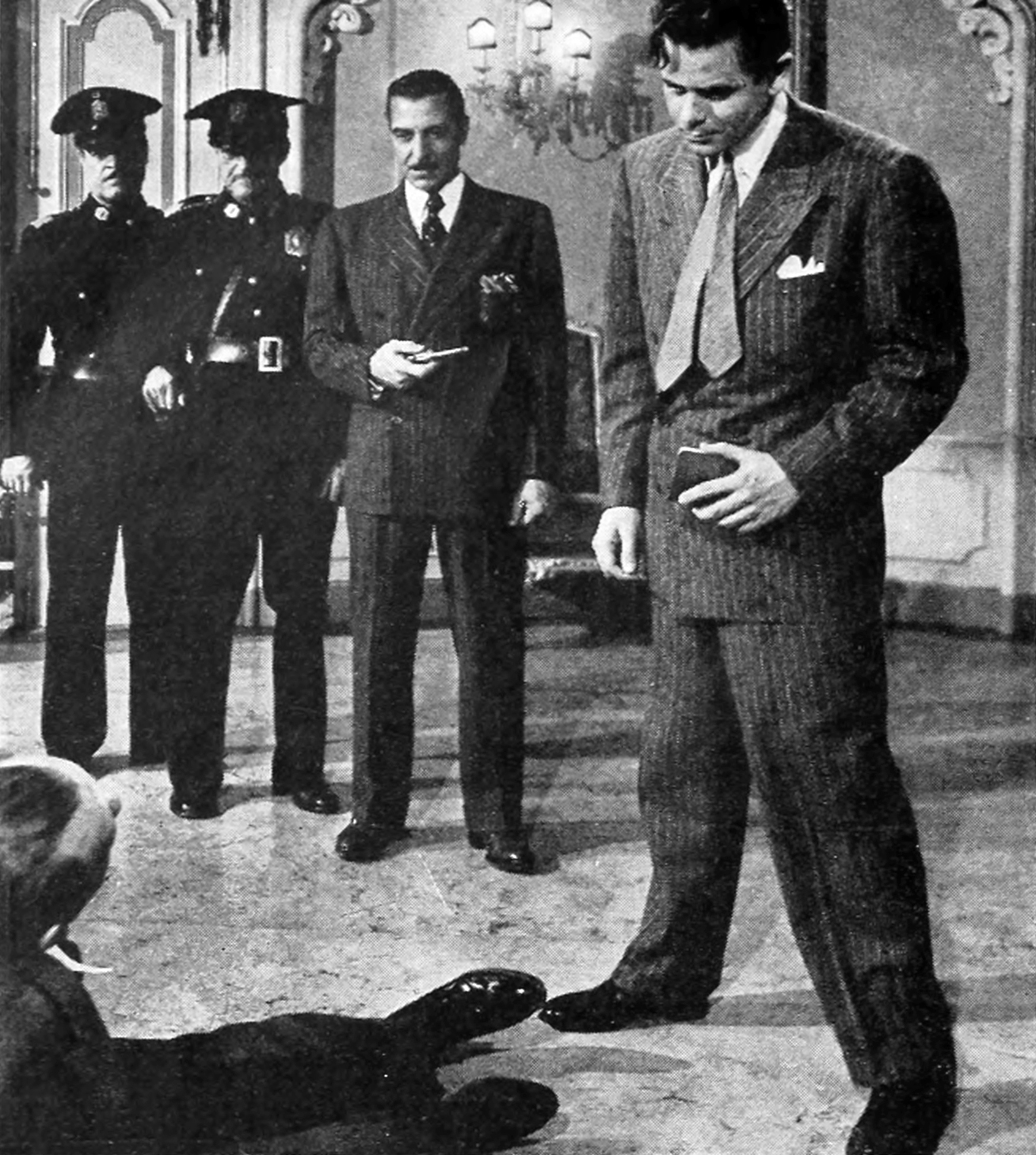
Calleia and Glenn Ford in Gilda (1946)

Algiers (1938)

The Gorilla (1939)

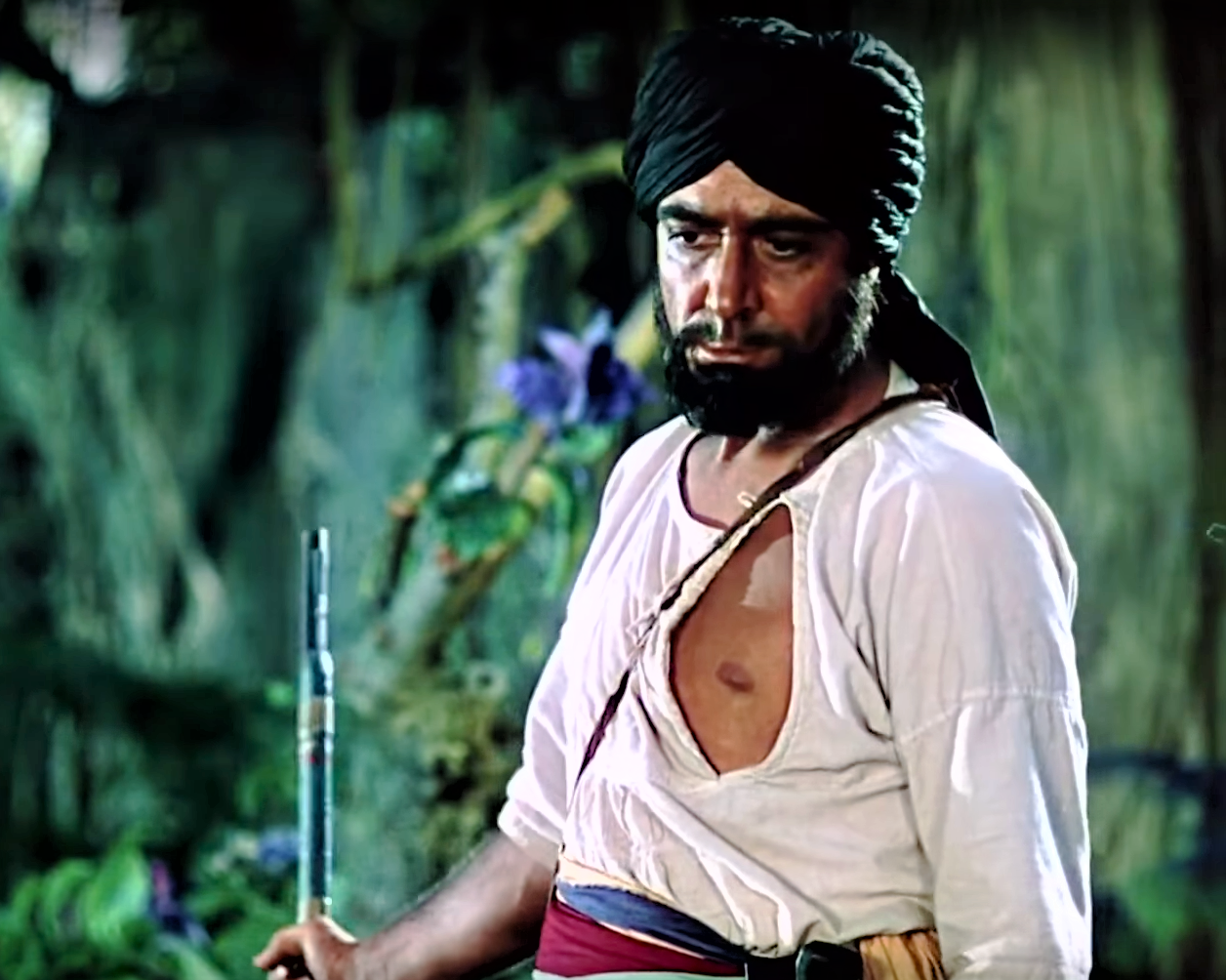
Rudyard Kipling's Jungle Book (1942)

Year	Title	Role	Notes
1931	My Sin	Juan	
1931	His Woman	Agent	
1932	The Divorce Racket	Stephen Arnaud	
1935	Public Hero#1	Sonny Black	
1936	Riffraff	Nick Lewis	
1936	Exclusive Story	Ace Acello	
1936	Tough Guy	Joe Calerno	
1936	Robin Hood of El Dorado	—	Screenwriter
1936	His Brother's Wife	Fish-Eye	
1936	Sworn Enemy	Joe Emerald	
1936	Sinner Take All	Frank Penny	
1936	After the Thin Man	"Dancer"	
1937	Man of the People	Jack Moreno	
1937	The Bad Man of Brimstone	Portuguese Ben	
1938	Algiers	Inspector Slimane	National Board of Review Award
1938	Marie Antoinette	Drouet	
1939	Juarez	Alejandro Uradi	
1939	The Gorilla	Stranger	
1939	Five Came Back	Vasquez	
1939	Golden Boy	Eddie Fuseli	
1939	Full Confession	Father Loma	
1940	My Little Chickadee	Jeff Badger	
1940	Wyoming	John Buckley	
1941	The Monster and the Girl	Deacon	
1941	Sundown	Pallini	
1942	Rudyard Kipling's Jungle Book	Buldeo	
1942	The Glass Key	Nick Varna	
1943	For Whom the Bell Tolls	El Sordo	
1943	The Cross of Lorraine	Antonio Rodriguez	
1944	The Conspirators	Captain Pereira	
1946	Deadline at Dawn	Val Bartelli	
1946	Gilda	Det. Maurice Obregon	
1947	The Beginning or the End	Enrico Fermi	
1947	Lured	Dr. Moryani	
1948	The Noose Hangs High	Mike Craig	
1948	Four Faces West	Monte Marquez	
1948	Noose	Sugiani	U.S. title The Silk Noose
1950	Captain Carey, U.S.A.	Dr. Lunati	
1950	The Palomino	Miguel Gonzales	
1950	Branded	Mateo Rubriz	
1950	Vendetta	Guido Barracini	
1951	Valentino	Luigi Verducci	
1951	Pulitzer Prize Playhouse	Don Fernando	Episode: "Night Over Taos"
1951	The Light Touch	Lt. Massiro	
1952	When in Rome	Aggiunto Bodulli	
1952	Yankee Buccaneer	Count Domingo Del Prado	
1952	The Iron Mistress	Juan Moreno	
1953	The Caddy	Papa Anthony	
1955	Underwater!	Rico Herrera	
1955	The Treasure of Pancho Villa	Capt. Pablo Morales	
1955	The Littlest Outlaw	The Padre	
1956	Hot Blood	Papa Theodore Caldash	
1956	Serenade	Maestro Marcatello	
1957	Wild Is the Wind	Alberto	
1958	Touch of Evil	Pete Menzies	
1958	The Light in the Forest	Chief Cuyloga	
1958	Have Gun – Will Travel	Sheriff Sam Truett	Episode: "The Manhunter"
1959	Zorro	Padre Simeon	Episode:"The Sergeant Sees Red"
1959	Cry Tough	Papa Estrada	
1960	The Alamo	Juan Seguín	
1963	Johnny Cool	Tourist	
1963	Bob Hope Presents the Chrysler Theatre	Cagewa	Episode:"A Killing at Sundial"

== Select radio credits ==
Date	Title	Role	Notes
March 2, 1939	Kraft Music Hall	Guest star	Calleia sings "Adelai", the popular song he and George Abbott wrote for Broadway's The Broken Wing (1920–21)
February 25, 1940	The Screen Guild Theater	Hal Wilson	"Blind Alley" with Edward G. Robinson
November 12, 1943	Stage Door Canteen	Guest star	
February 18, 1944	Stage Door Canteen	Guest star	
November 24, 1944	Stage Door Canteen	Guest star	
November 7, 1948	Theatre Guild on the Air		"Criminal Code" with Pat O'Brien

== Legacy ==
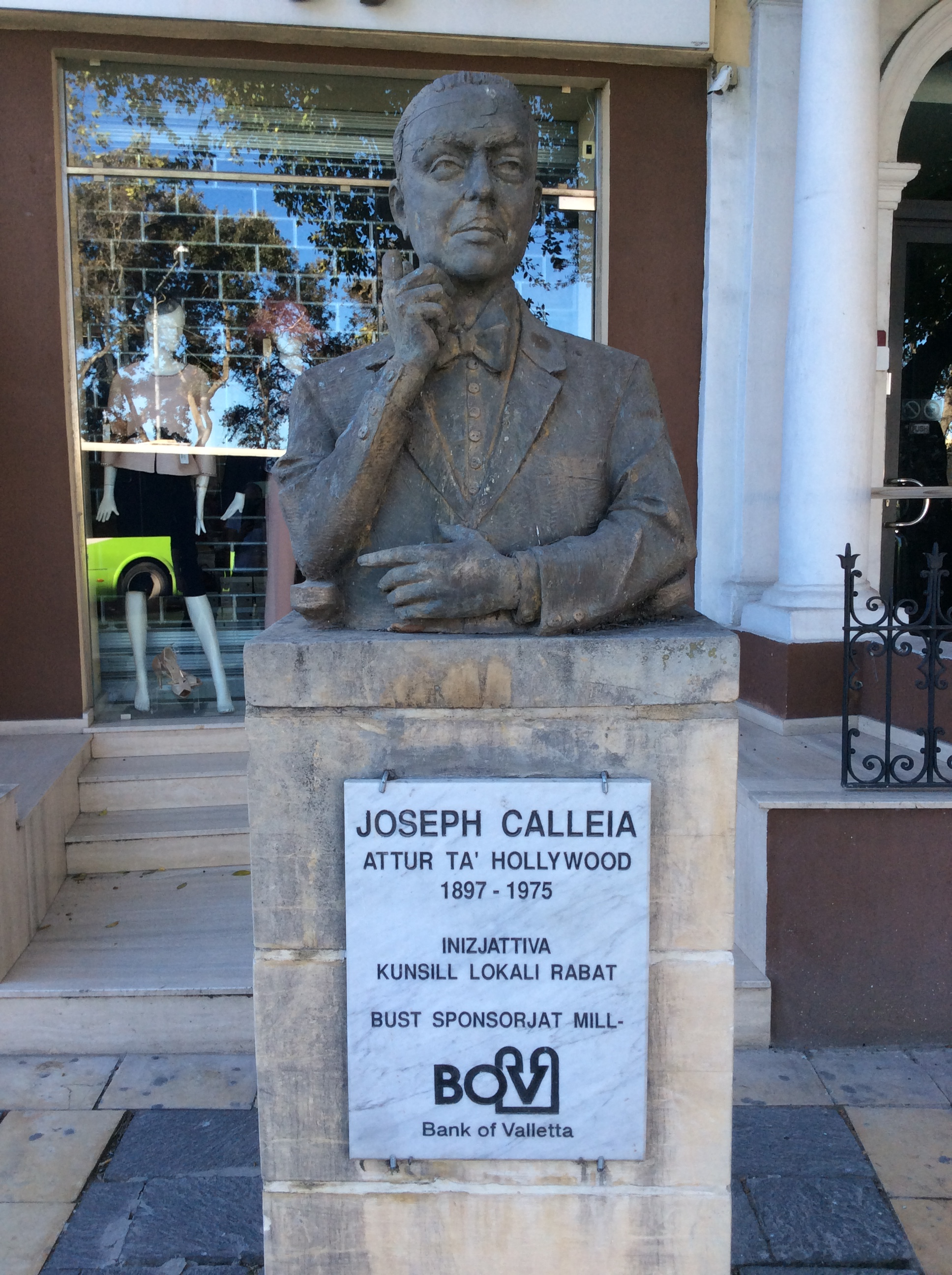
Monument to Calleia in Rabat, Malta, close to Mdina, sponsored by the Bank of Valletta.

Calleia was posthumously honored by the Malta postal authority with a set of two commemorative stamps issued in 1997. In 2005, a bust of Calleia by sculptor Anton Agius was installed at his birthplace in Malta on the initiative of then 15-year-old Eman Bonnici.

The house in Mrabat Street, St. Julian's where Calleia lived after 1963 was demolished in September 2023.
