= Owen Martin =

American actor and vaudeville entertainer

- Born: Owen J. Martin; December 16, 1888; County Armagh, Ireland
- Died: May 4, 1960 (aged 72); Saranac Lake, New York, New York, U.S.
- Occupation: Actor
- Years active: 1912–1958
- Spouse: Edna Terry Gorbley

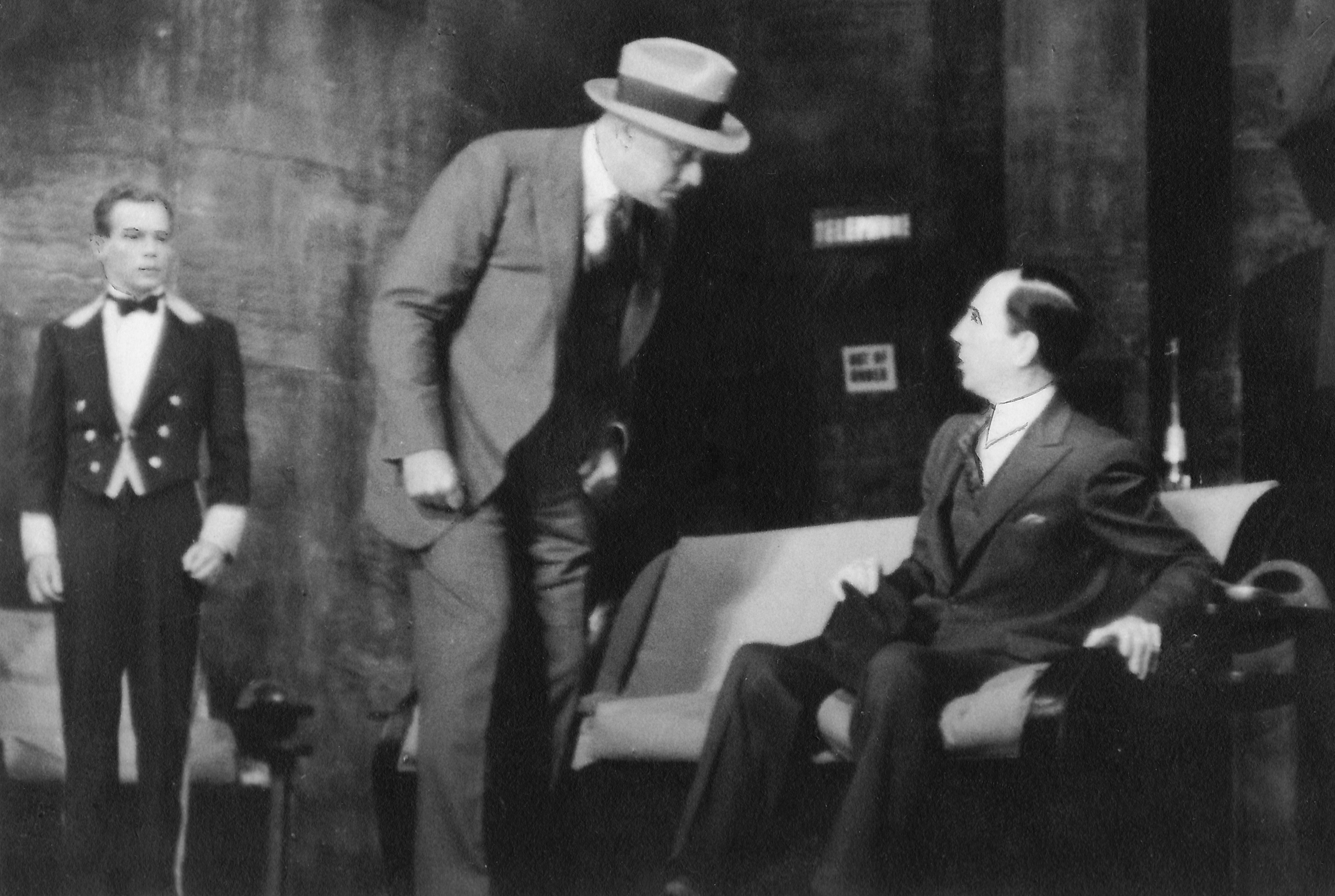
Martin (on right) in Small Miracle in 1934

Owen J. Martin (December 15, 1887 – May 4, 1960) was an American stage and screen character actor and vaudeville entertainer, best known for his more than decade-long participation in the original Broadway production—and subsequent national tour—of Rodgers and Hammerstein's Oklahoma, being the sole member of that show's original cast to appear in the entire five-year, two-month Broadway run.

== Early life and career ==
Born on December 15, 1887 in County Armagh, Ireland, Martin arrived with his parents at the Port of New York in June 1892. Prior to emigration, both parents had been Irish vaudeville performers. Martin made his stage debut in September 1905 alongside a young Leora Spellman at the Lyceum Theatre in Elizabeth, New Jersey, portraying "Billy" in a production of William Gillette's oft-revived adaptation of Arthur Conan Doyle's Sherlock Holmes stories. (Note: In January 1932, Martin told the Boston Globe that he had made his stage debut two decades earlier alongside William Gillette, taking the role of Billy in the actor-playwright's famous Sherlock Holmes stage adaptation. However, documentation of any such collaboration has yet to surface. That said, Martin did indeed play that part, and more than six years earlier than indicated, but apparently not in any production featuring Gillette himself.)

Characterized at the time of his death as "a trim, sandy-haired man of short stature" by the Associated Press (at least partially borne out by this 1958 image), Martin at age 29—on his 1917 declaration of intent to attain citizenship—was measured at five feet, seven inches and 135 pounds, with brown hair and grey eyes.

In 1924, in a play that also featured his future wife, Edna Terry (a casting which may well have constituted their first real-life meeting), Martin co-starred with Sylvia De Frankie in the Matthews-Nichols farce, Just Married. Reviewing the play, E. R. K. of The Morning News wrote, "Such inconsistencies as may have been glaring at first were completely lost in the clever bit done by Mr. Owen Martin as Robert Adams when he tried, and succeeded, to put on a pair of trousers under his bed coverings.

Of course to a mere woman the scene was merely funny, but to the 'trousers sex' it almost stopped the show. Upon Mr. Martin's shoulders rested the burden of the comedy making and the interpretation of many lines which might have been too obvious in lesser hands. [...] Martin's comedy is of the quiet type, his success is greatly strengthened by an almost impassive face which is neither a mask nor a caricature.

On June 26, 1948, UPI reported that Martin's recently achieved milestone of 2,275 consecutive performances of Oklahoma was "said to be the longest run without a break any actor has ever had in an American play." Throughout this much-cited run, Martin harbored no illusions about his good fortune. Speaking with Oklahoma's director, Rouben Mamoulian, he confided, "The steady work has kept me young. In show business, it's those four-week rehearsals and two-week runs that age you." Responding to reporter inquiries along similar lines, Martin remained adamant. "People ask me if I'm tired of 'Oklahoma'. That's a laugh. Things were pretty bad in the thirties and early forties. I thank God every night for 'Oklahoma'.

For his part, Oklahoma composer Richard Rodgers personally thanked Martin after the actor’s and the show’s 2,001st performance, which Rodgers himself conducted.[1] He presented Martin with a specially engraved gold watch, which remained a highly prized and frequently used possession more than ten years later..

Following the conclusion of Oklahoma's national tour in 1954, Martin appeared as Max in the touring company of The Pajama Game for over two years before reprising the role in the 1957 film version. In March 1958, Martin appeared yet again—this time as "Andrew 'Pop' Carnes"—in Oklahoma, in a limited, two-week revival at New York City Center.

== Personal life and death ==
In 1926, Martin married fellow performer Edna Terry, née Gorbly.

Survived by his wife, Martin died at age 72 on May 4, 1960, at Will Rogers Memorial Hospital in Saranac Lake, New York. A Requiem Mass in his honor was held five days later at St. Malachy Roman Catholic Church in Manhattan.

== Works ==
=== Stage ===
- Sherlock Holmes – Lyceum Theatre (Elizabeth, New Jersey) (Sep 28, 1905 – ?); Academy of Music (Jersey City, New Jersey (December 1905) – Billy
- Just Married – Wilmington Playhouse (Wilmington, Delaware) (Oct 17 – 18, 1924) – Robert Adams
- The Big Fight – Majestic Theatre (Broadway) (Sep 18, 1928 – Oct 1928) – Pinkie Frye
- Little Accident – Belasco Theater (Los Angeles) (Aug 12, 1929 – Sep 7, 1929) - Mr. Hicks
- As Good as New – Times Square Theatre (Nov 3, 1930 – Dec 1930) – Detective Franklin
- Cloudy With Showers – Morosco Theatre (Sep 1, 1931 – Nov 1931) – Short Man
- Man Bites Dog – Lyceum Theatre (Apr 25, 1933 – May 1933) – Snake Barlum
- The Pure in Heart – Longacre Theatre (Mar 20, 1934 – Mar 1934) – Iceman, 2nd Detective
- Small Miracle – John Golden Theatre (Sep 26, 1934 – Nov 10, 1934); 48th Street Theatre (Nov 11, 1934 - Jan 1935) – Anderson
- Brother Rat – Geary Theater (San Francisco) (Jul 1937) – Chauffeur
- Come Across – Playhouse Theatre (Sep 4, 1938 – Sep 1938) – Lefty Grey
- The Boys from Syracuse – Alvin Theatre (Nov 23, 1938 – June 10, 1939) – Sorcerer
- Goodbye in the Night – Biltmore Theatre (Mar 18 – 23, 1940) – Joe
- The Night Before Christmas – Morosco Theatre (Apr 10 – 27, 1941) – Smitty
- The Man with Blond Hair – Belasco Theatre (Nov 4 – 8, 1941) – Harvey
- What Big Ears! – Windsor Theatre (Apr 20 – 25, 1942) – Lucas
- Strip for Action – National Theatre (Sep 30, 1942 – Jan 2, 1943)– Mitch
- Oklahoma – St. James Theatre (Mar 31, 1943 – May 29, 1948) – Cord Elam
- Oklahoma – Broadway Theatre (May 29, 1951 – Jul 28, 1951) – Cord Elam
- Oklahoma – New York City Center (Aug 31, 1953 – Oct 3, 1953) – Andrew Carnes
- Oklahoma – New York City Center (Mar 19 – 30, 1958) – Andrew Carnes

=== Screen ===
- The Parson and the Bully (1911) – Parson Lewis
- Half Shot at Sunrise (1930) – Officer who delivers Marshall-addressed letter to Capt. Jones (uncredited)
- The Side Show Mystery (1932)
- A Mail Bride (1932)
- Sherlock's Home (1932)
- You're Killing Me (1932)
- At the Races (1934)
- Daredevil O'Dare (1934) – Pa
- The Choke's on You (1936) – Strangler's Manager
- The Pajama Game (1958) – Max

== See also ==
- Vitaphone Varieties
