= The World's Full of Girls =

The World's Full of Girls is a play in three acts by Nunnally Johnson which was adapted from Thomas Bell's 1943 novel Till I Come Back to You. The work premiered on Broadway on December 6, 1943, at the Royale Theatre. The cast included Thomas W. Ross as Mr. Bridges, Eva Condon as Mrs. Bridges, Walter Burke as Nick, Julie Stevens as Hannah, Gloria Grahame Hallward as Florrie, Virginia Gilmore as Sally, Frances Heflin as Adele, Berry Kroeger as Miley, Thomas Hume as Dave, Charles Lang as Edward, Harry Bellaver as Sergeant Snyder, John Conway as Mel Fletcher, and Cora Smith as Mrs. Fletcher.
