= Gods of the Lightning =

1928 Broadway drama

- Original language: English
- Written by: Maxwell Anderson
- Genre: Drama
- Setting: Lyceum Restaurant, District Attorney's office, Supreme Court court room

Premiere
- Date: October 24, 1928
- Place: Little Theatre; New York City, New York

Gods of the Lightning was a 1928 Broadway three-act drama written by Maxwell Anderson and Harold Hickerson, produced by Hamilton MacFadden and Kellogg Gary and staged by MacFadden. It ran for 29 performances from October 24, 1928 to November 1928 at the Little Theatre. The Sacco-Vanzetti case was the play's inspiration, Charles Bickford in the Sacco character role. Anderson later wrote an updated Sacco-Vanzetti play titled Winterset.

== Cast ==
- Morris Ankrum as Spiker
- Jules Artfield as Heine
- Charles Bickford as Macready
- Barton MacLane as Ward
- Sylvia Sidney as Rosalie
- Horace Braham as Capraro
- Maynard Burgess as Lubin
- Eva Condon as Mrs. Lubin
- Robert Brister as Salter
- Leo Bulgakov as Suvorin
- Del Cleveland as District Attorney asst.
- Samuel Coit as Sowerby
- Edward Cutler as clerk of court
- Willard Dashiell as Haslet
- Jules Ferrar as Bauer
- Benjamin Fesseden as policeman
- Moss Fleisig as Jerusalem Slim
- John R. Hamilton as Gluckstein
- Thomas Kelly as Andy
- Arthur Pederson as Pete
- Molly Ricardel as Salvation Lassie
- Lloyd Sabine as police sgt.
- Sam Silverbush as Ike
- Ian Wolfe as Milkin
- Douglas Wood as Judge Vail
- Harry Bliven as Bartlett
- Henry Engel as Sheriff Henry
