= National Board of Review Awards 1938 =

Annual US film awards ceremony

10th National Board of Review Awards

December 15, 1938

The 10th National Board of Review Awards were announced on 15 December 1938.

== Best American Films ==
1. The Citadel
2. Snow White and the Seven Dwarfs
3. The Beachcomber
4. To the Victor
5. Sing You Sinners
6. The Edge of the World
7. Of Human Hearts
8. Jezebel
9. South Riding
10. Three Comrades

== Top Foreign Films ==
1. Grand Illusion
2. Ballerina
3. Un carnet de bal
4. La Guerre des boutons
5. Peter the First
6. Professor Mamlock

== Winners ==
- Best American Film: The Citadel
- Best Foreign Film: La grande illusion (Grand Illusion), France
- Best Acting:
  - Lew Ayres - Holiday
  - Pierre Blanchar, Harry Baur, Louis Jouvet, Raimu - Un carnet de bal
  - James Cagney - Angels with Dirty Faces
  - Joseph Calleia - Algiers
  - Chico - Adventures of Chico
  - Robert Donat - The Citadel
  - Will Fyffe - To the Victor
  - Pierre Fresnay, Jean Gabin, Dita Parlo, Erich von Stroheim - Grand Illusion
  - John Garfield - Four Daughters
  - Wendy Hiller - Pygmalion
  - Charles Laughton, Elsa Lanchester - The Beachcomber
  - Robert Morley - Marie Antoinette
  - Ralph Richardson - South Riding / The Citadel
  - Margaret Sullavan - Three Comrades
  - Spencer Tracy - Boys Town
