= The Man with Blond Hair =

Play by Norman Krasna

- Original language: English
- Written by: Norman Krasna
- Subject: Nazis
- Genre: Drama
- Setting: Roof of an East Side tenement; The Hoffman living room

Premiere
- Date: 4 November 1941
- Place: New York

The Man With Blond Hair is a play by Norman Krasna based on a true story. Although Krasna became better known for comedy this was a drama; the writer later said that he "really wrote" the play "to win the Nobel Peace Prize". The play only ran for 7 performances on Broadway. This failure prompted him to return to comedy and Krasna wrote Dear Ruth his most popular hit.

== Plot ==
Two Nazi airmen, Rudolph and Stumer, escape internment in Canada and find themselves in New York where they are arrested. A policeman arranges for them to escape so the policeman may recapture and beat them.

Stumer escapes but Rudolph is captured by a gang of kids. They are about to force him to jump off a roof when Ruth, fiancée of one boy Involved, takes him away to her apartment via the fire escape.

At Ruth's apartment he is fed and well treated by her mother, while the boys search for him. One of the boys is shot by the police before he is about to spot Rudolph. Rudolph gives himself up to the police.

== Original cast ==
- Eleanor Lynn as Ruth Hoffmann
- Rex Williams as Rudolph
- Bernard Lenrow as Stumer
- Dora Weissman as Mrs Hoffmann
- Coby Ruskin as Harry
- Robert Williams as Matt
- Alfred Ryder as John
- James Gregory as Frank Connors
- Curt Conway as Sidney
- Rex Williams as Carl
- George Wallach as messenger boy
- Francis de Sales as McCarthy
- Owen Martin as Harvey

== Background ==
In September 1941 Krasna arrived in New York to begin rehearsals. The play was then called Fire Escape. RKO were financing the entire production and Krasna was making his Broadway directorial debut.

== Reception ==
The Christian Science Monitor called the play "essentially immature and inconclusive."

The New York Times said it "contains several interesting scenes, offers two excellent tenement settings... and bits of engaging acting... this correspondent was never bored... but it could never believe his melodrama. It looked very like a loosely contrived and whimsical play, more interested in bravaura scenes than integrity."

== Production history ==
The Broadway production closed after seven performances. This led to Krasna delay plans to put on a play he had written with Groucho Marx, The Time of Elizabeth. "I got burned on the other one; we want to be careful next time", said Krasna. Krasna sold the story to the movies. In October 1943 Warners announced they purchased Night Action as a vehicle for Helmut Dantine and were to make it after Dantine finished Northern Pursuit. Warners did not say how much they paid for it. In October George Sklar was assigned to write the script. However the film was not made.
