= Full Confession =

- Theatrical release poster
- Directed by: John Farrow
- Written by: Jerome Cady
- Based on: story by Leo Birinski
- Produced by: Robert Sisk
- Starring: Victor McLaglen; Sally Eilers; Barry Fitzgerald; Joseph Calleia
- Cinematography: J. Roy Hunt
- Edited by: Harry Marker
- Music by: Roy Webb
- Production company: RKO Radio Pictures
- Distributed by: RKO Radio Pictures
- Release date: September 8, 1939
- Running time: 78 minutes
- Country: United States
- Language: English

Full Confession is a 1939 American crime drama film made by RKO Radio Pictures. It was directed by John Farrow from an adaptation by Jerome Cady of Leo Birinski's story. The film stars Victor McLaglen, Sally Eilers, Barry Fitzgerald and Joseph Calleia.

== Plot ==
Pat McGinnis (Victor McLaglen) murders a policeman and escapes by committing a more minor crime, for which he is arrested and jailed. An innocent man, Michael O'Keefe (Barry Fitzgerald), is convicted of the murder and sentenced to death. While delirious after an injury, McGinnis confesses to priest Father Loma (Joseph Calleia). Loma, whose flock includes McGinnis's girlfriend Molly Sullivan (Sally Eilers) as well as the O'Keefe clan, struggles to find a way to save O'Keefe without violating the sanctity of confession. He must convince McGinnis to give himself up.

== Cast ==
- Victor McLaglen as Pat McGinnis
- Sally Eilers as Molly Sullivan
- Joseph Calleia as Father Loma
- Barry Fitzgerald as Michael O'Keefe
- Elisabeth Risdon as Norah O'Keefe
- Pamela Blake as Laura Mahoney (as Adele Pearce)
- Malcolm 'Bud' McTaggart as Frank O'Keefe
- John Bleifer as Weaver
- William Haade as Moore
- George Humbert as Mercantonio
- Stanley Blystone as Detective (uncredited)
- Robert Homans as Bartender (uncredited)

== Production ==
Pandro S. Berman of RKO bought the film rights to Leo Birinski's story in January 1939 intending to turn it into a vehicle for Chester Morris. Robert Sisk was assigned to produce.

Eventually the lead role was given to Victor McLaglen and John Farrow was given the job of directing. A key support part was given to Barry Fitzgerald, who had appeared in The Informer (1935) with McLaglen and had not made a film since Bringing Up Baby (1938); he had most recently been on Broadway in The White Steed.

Lucille Ball was to play the female lead but was ultimately unable to because she was recovering from an operation for appendicitis. Filming started 15 June 1939.

== Notes ==
Full Confession is often regarded as a semi-remake of John Ford's The Informer (1935) starring the same leading man, Victor McLaglen.
