= Small Miracle =

1934 play by Norman Krasna

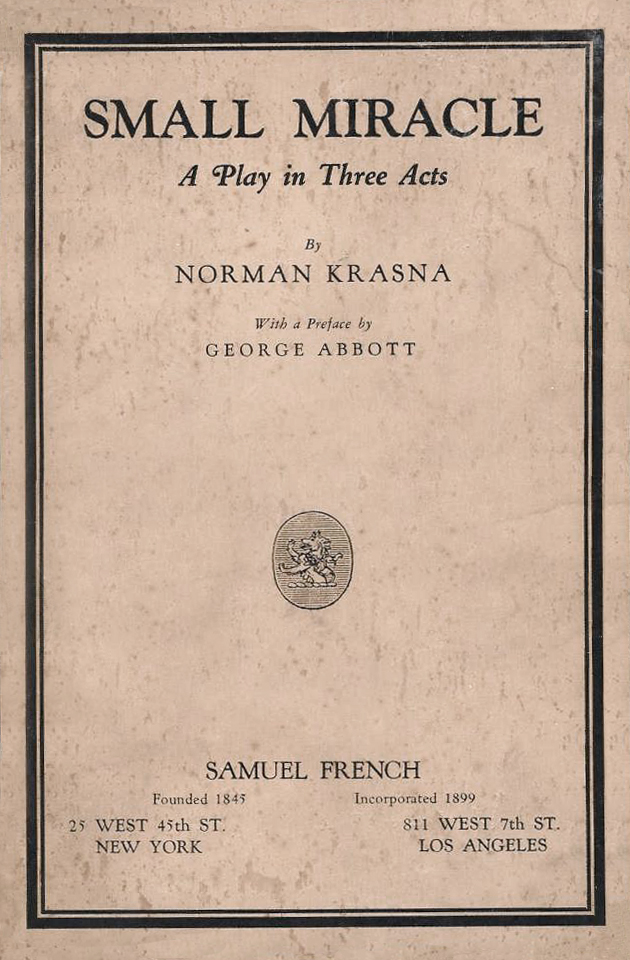
- First edition dust jacket (1935)
- Written by: Norman Krasna
- Original language: English
- Genre: Melodrama
- Setting: Lounge of the 43rd Street Theatre, New York

Premiere
- Date premiered: September 26, 1934
- Place premiered: John Golden Theatre, New York City, New York

Small Miracle is a 1934 play by Norman Krasna, presented on Broadway with Joseph Calleia in the featured role. Directed by George Abbott with a single setting designed by Boris Aronson, the three-act melodrama opened September 26, 1934, at the John Golden Theatre, New York. It continued at the 48th Street Theatre November 11, 1934 – January 5, 1935. On February 7, 1935, the play began a run at the El Capitan Theatre in Hollywood, with Calleia, Joseph King and Robert Middlemass reprising their Broadway roles.

It was Krasna's second play, written in the evenings while he was working as a Columbia Pictures contract writer during the day. He adapted the play for the Paramount Pictures film Four Hours to Kill! (1935).

== Cast ==
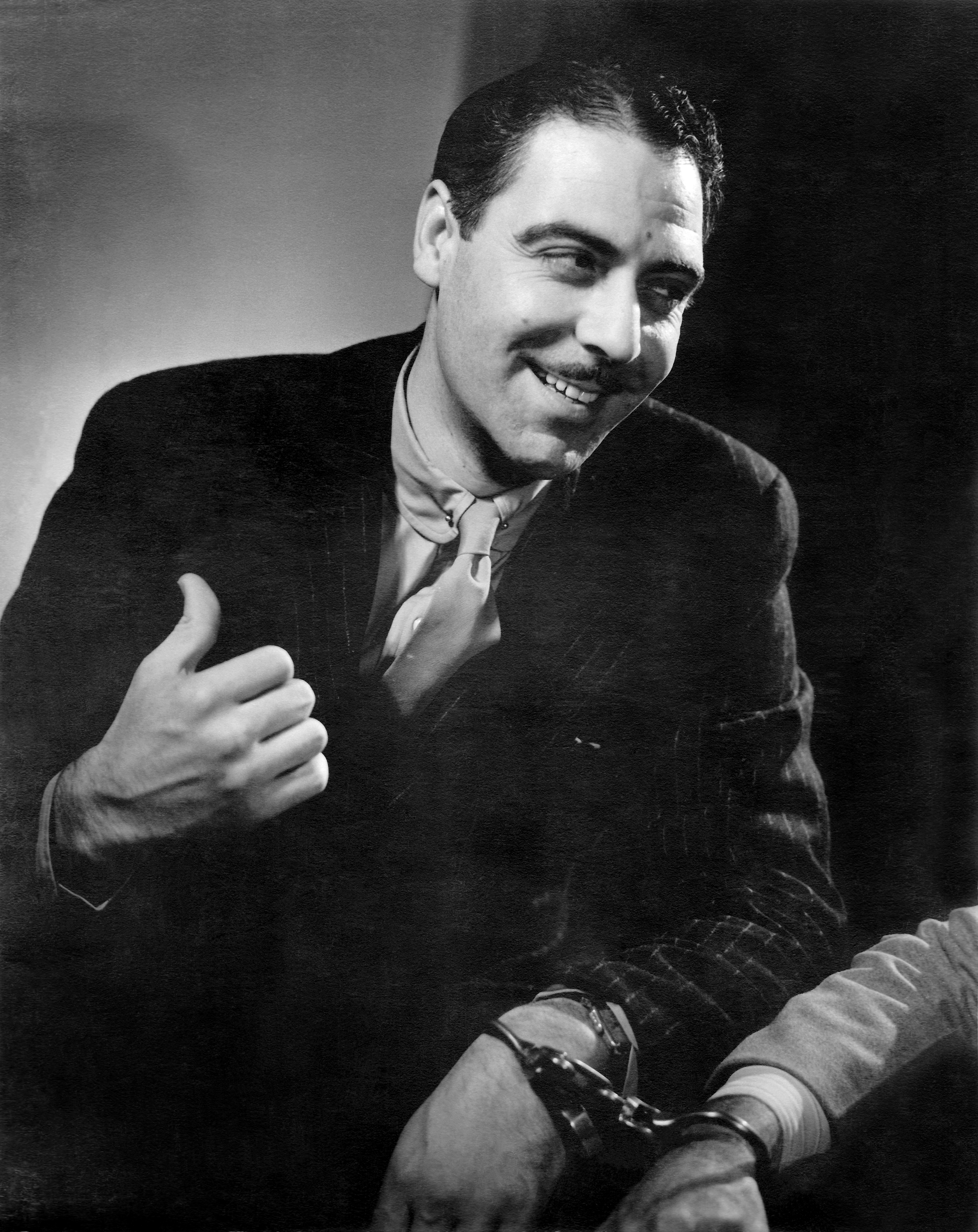
Joseph Calleia as Tony Mako in Small Miracle

- Edward Crandall as Carl Barrett Jr.
- Joseph Calleia as Tony Mako
- Joseph King as Joseph Taft
- Eva Condon as Ma
- William Wadsworth as Herman
- G. Albert Smith as William S. Johnson
- Myron McCormick as Eddie
- Elspeth Eric as Mae Danish
- Wyrley Birch as Mac Mason
- Fraye Gilbert as Helen
- James Lane as Repair man
- Ilka Chase as Sylvia Temple
- Lucille Strudwick as Anna
- Jean Bellows as Kitty
- Edna Hagan as Twelve-year-old girl
- George Lambert as Stanley Madison
- Violet Barney as Mrs. Madison
- Hitour Gray as Donald Madison
- Allan Hale as George Nelson
- Robert Middlemass as Captain Seaver
- Herbert Duffy as Healy
- Owen Martin as Anderson
- Helen Gardner as First Girl
- Nancy Vane as Second Girl

== Reception ==
The New Yorker called Small Miracle "a very satisfactory melodrama with Joseph Spurin-Calleia as the pleasantest murderer you ever saw."

"George Abbott's talent for accuracy of detail has given this tabloid tale of Times Square passions an uncanny, cumulative fascination," wrote drama critic Brooks Atkinson of The New York Times. Praising Boris Aronson's set design and the performances of Ilka Chase, Myron McCormick, Elspeth Eric, Joseph King and Robert Middlemass, he reserved his highest praise for the featured actor: "Joseph Spurin-Calleia as the prisoner plays with such keen authenticity and such sensitive understatement of emotion that his scenes are enormously moving. Type casting becomes an art when an actor can draw so much pulsing truth out of a character."

The Stage magazine wrote that "there have been few gangsters of the heartbreaking calibre of Joseph Spurin-Calleia's Tony Mako. To this excellent, rather quiet melodrama with its paucity of dead bodies, he gives a sure feeling of impending catastrophe."

== Gallery ==
Photographs of the original Broadway production of Small Miracle appeared in the November 1934 issue of The Stage magazine.

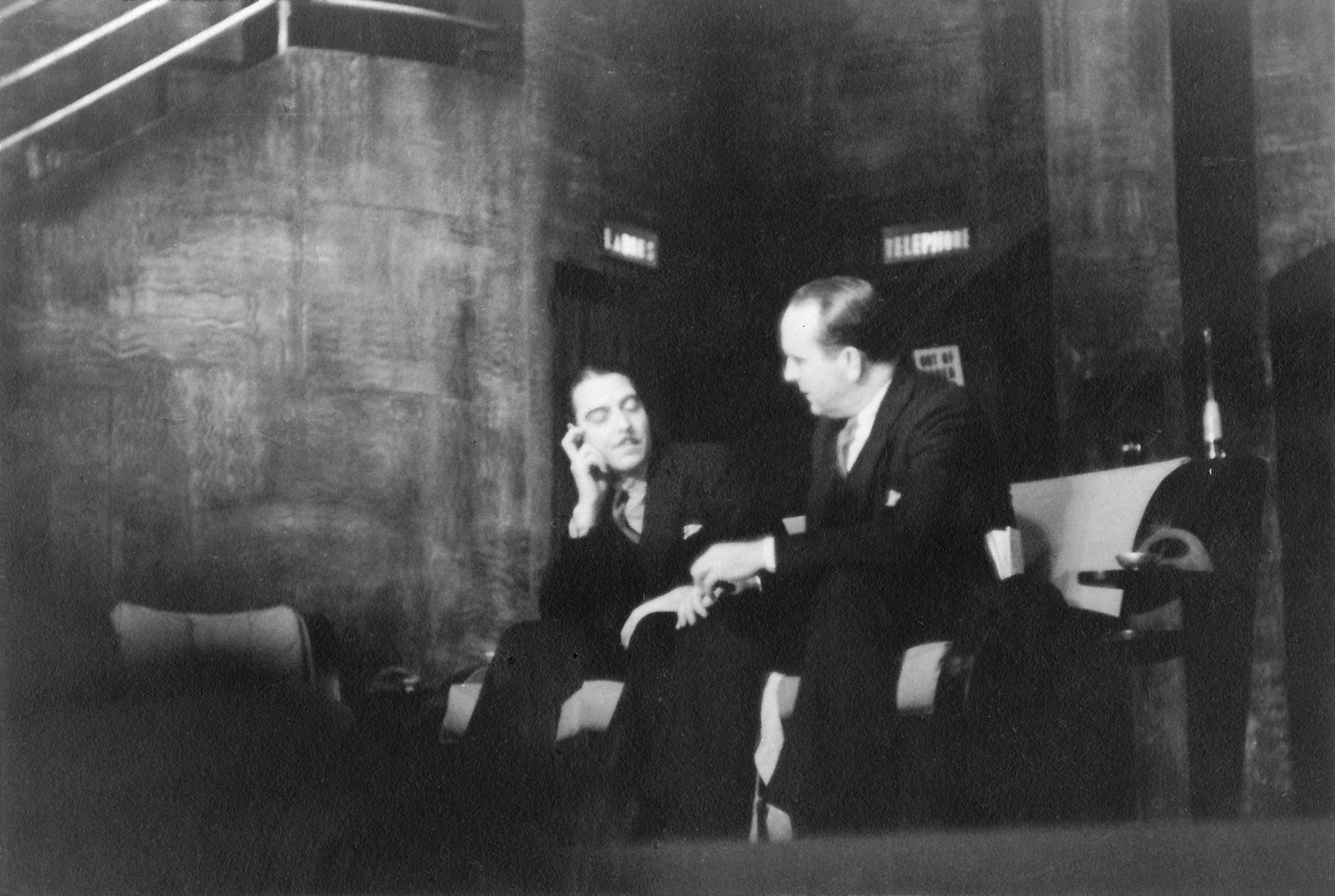
Set in the lounge of a Broadway theatre, the drama centers around a condemned prisoner (Joseph Calleia) and a cop (Joseph King) who have missed their train and have four hours to kill.

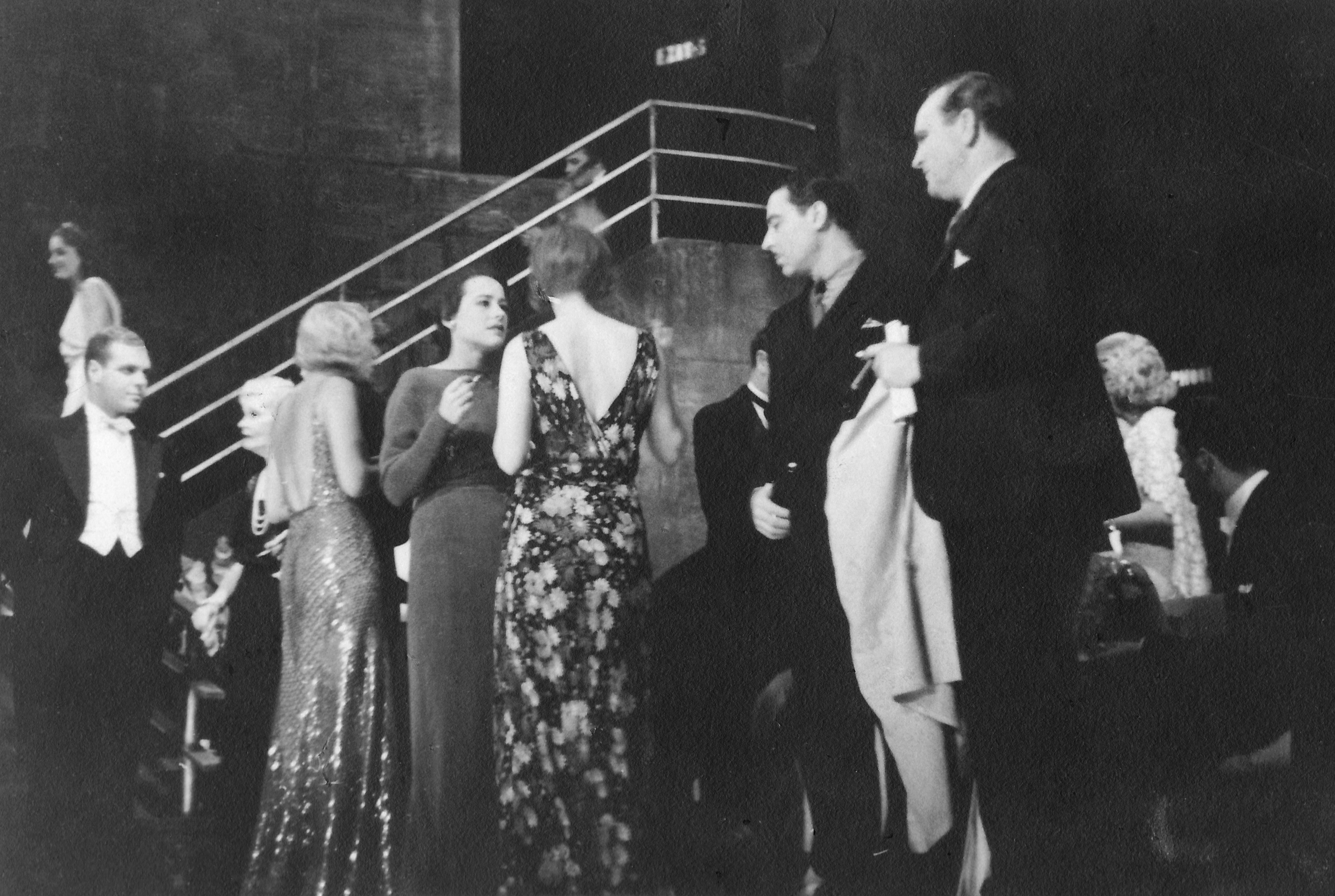
Nobody notices the handcuffs under the overcoat during the intermission at the 43rd Street Theatre.

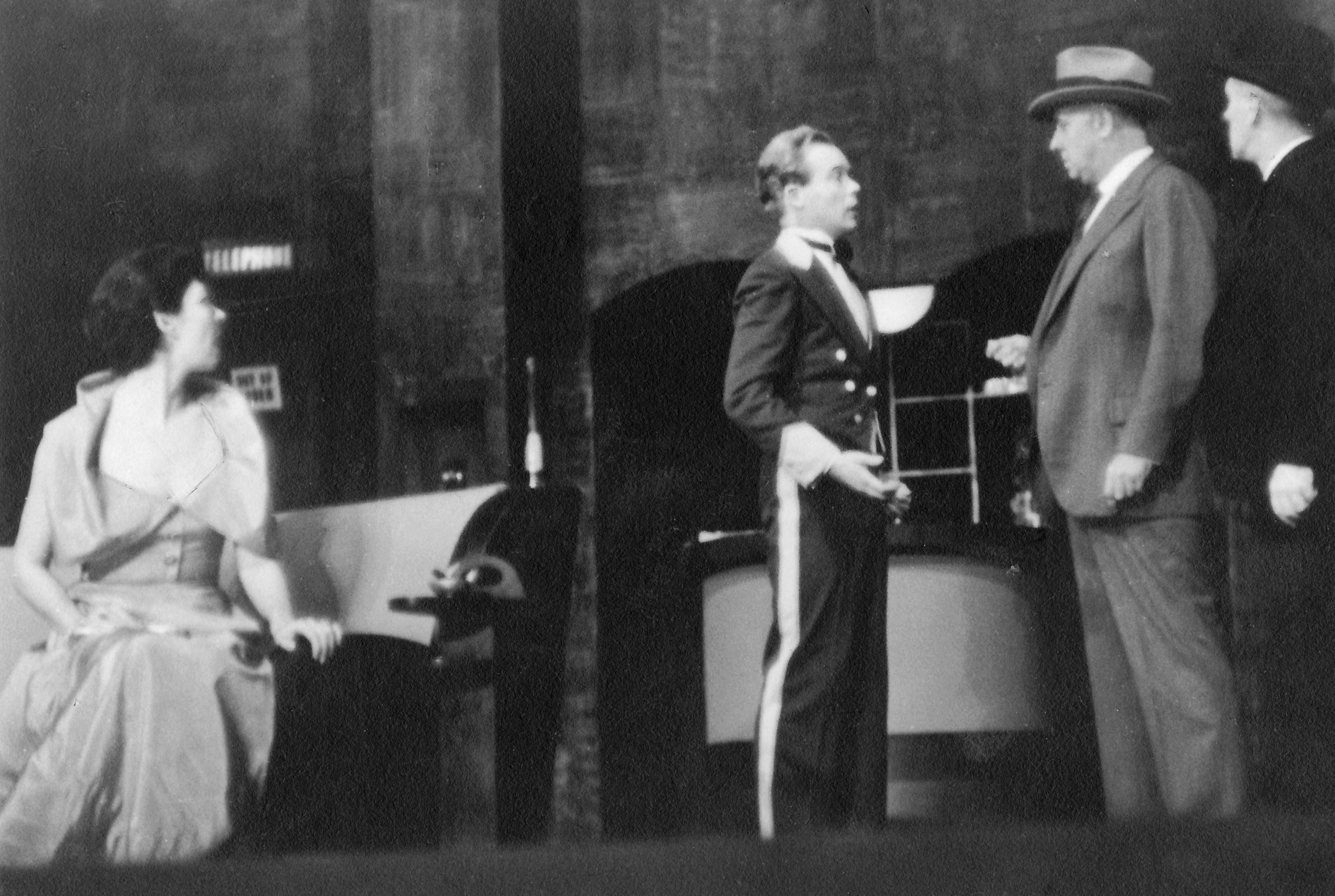
A hat-check boy (Myron McCormick) is questioned about some missing jewelry belonging to a theatre patron (Ilka Chase).

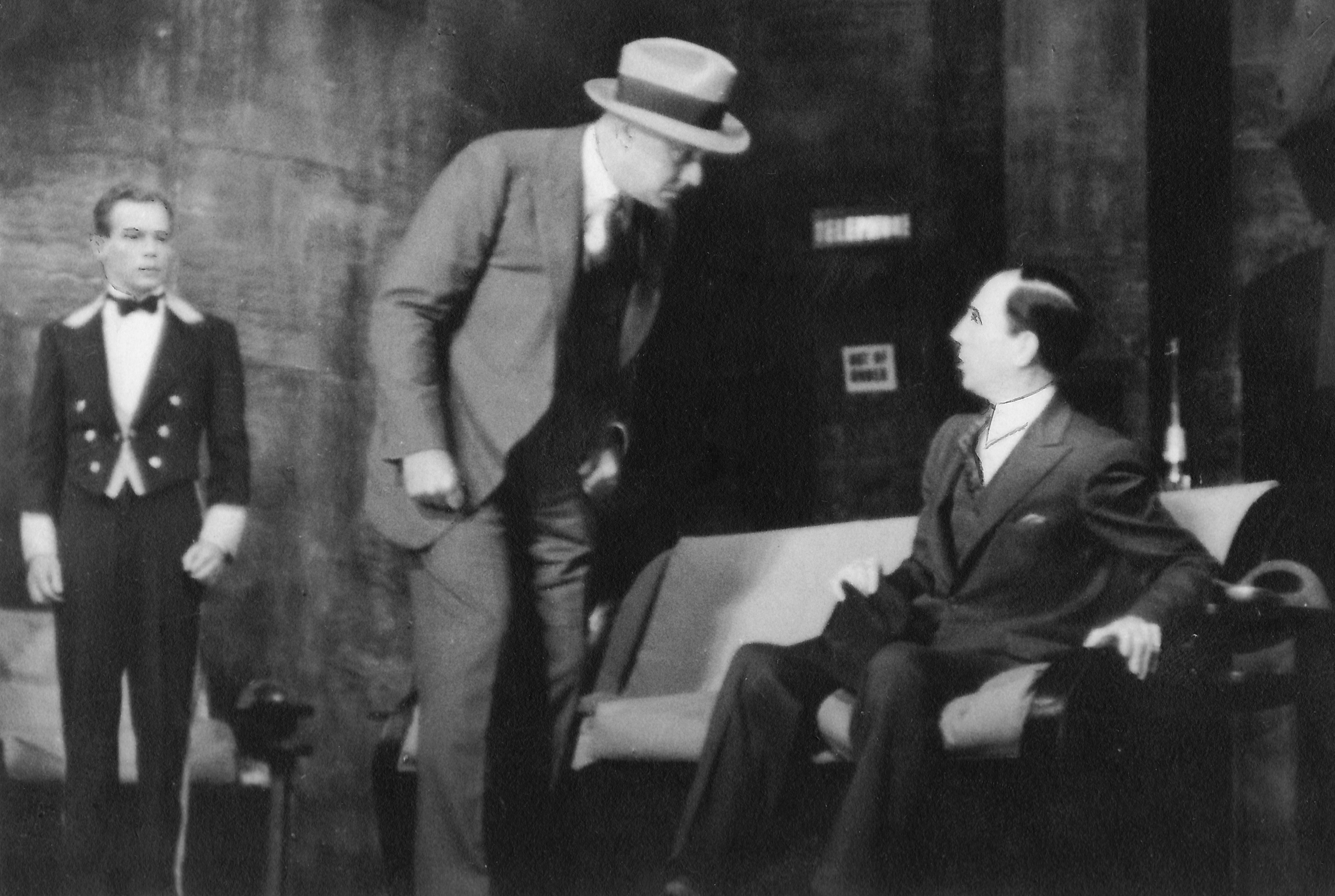
A squealer is grilled by the police captain (Robert Middlemass), who suspects him of aiding the prisoner's escape.

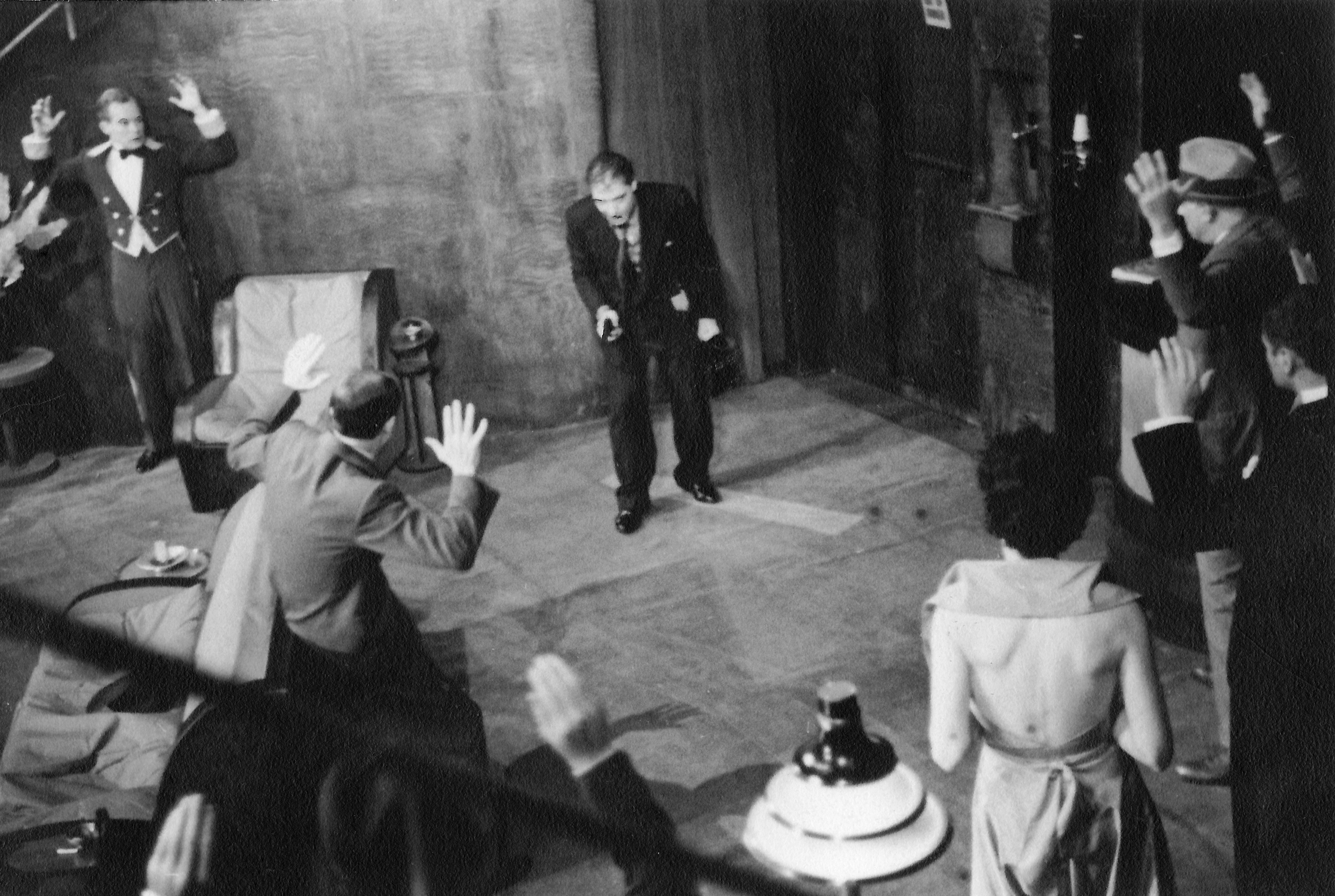
In the big scene the small miracle happens: The killer gets his man and his death.

== Publication history ==
Small Miracle was published in 1935 by Samuel French, Inc., with a preface by George Abbott.

== Adaptations ==
Krasna adapted Small Miracle for the Paramount Pictures film Four Hours to Kill!, released in April 1935 and starring Richard Barthelmess. In 1944, Paramount Pictures announced it would film a new adaptation of Small Miracle, starring Alan Ladd; the project was not made.
