= Algiers (1938 film) =

1938 American drama film

- Theatrical release poster
- Directed by: John Cromwell
- Screenplay by: John Howard Lawson
- Additional dialogue by: James M. Cain
- Based on: Pépé le Moko; 1937 novel by Henri La Barthe; Pépé le Moko; 1937 film
- Produced by: Walter Wanger
- Starring: Charles Boyer; Sigrid Gurie; Hedy Lamarr; Alan Hale Sr.
- Cinematography: James Wong Howe
- Edited by: Otho Lovering; William H. Reynolds
- Music by: Vincent Scotto; Mohamed Ygerbuchen
- Production company: Walter Wanger Productions
- Distributed by: United Artists
- Release date: August 5, 1938 (US)
- Running time: 99 minutes
- Country: United States
- Language: English
- Budget: $691,833
- Box office: $951,801

Algiers is a 1938 American crime drama film directed by John Cromwell, written by John Howard Lawson and starring Charles Boyer, Sigrid Gurie and Hedy Lamarr. The plot concerns a French jewel thief hiding in Algiers who meets a beautiful French tourist. The Walter Wanger production (originally distributed by United Artists) was a remake of the successful 1937 French film Pépé le Moko, which derived its plot from the Henri La Barthe novel of the same name.

Algiers became a sensation because it was Lamarr's Hollywood debut. The film is notable as a source of inspiration to the screenwriters of the 1942 Warner Bros. film Casablanca, who wrote the later film with Lamarr in mind as the original female lead. Boyer's depiction of Pepe le Moko inspired the Warner Bros. animated character Pepé Le Pew. In 1966, the film entered the public domain in the United States because the claimants did not renew its copyright registration in the 28th year after publication.

== Plot ==
Pepe le Moko is a notorious jewel thief who has escaped from France. He has been settled for two years in the Casbah, or "native quarter", of Algiers, and is well-concealed there. Commissioner Janvier, a police detective from Paris, is determined to capture Pepe. One night, Janvier leads a raid on the Casbah, where Regis, a thief who is jealous of Pepe, leads the detectives to Grandpere. Regis goes to Ines, Pepe's mistress, to warn her that the police are arriving. Ines arrives at Grandpere's house to warn Pepe, who suspects Regis of informing the police. When the police arrive, Pepe hides in a basement until a shooting breaks out. Pepe escapes, although he is injured.

During the shooting, Inspector Slimane, an Algerian detective, brings Gaby, a French tourist, into his residence, where Pepe also arrives. While Slimane respects Pepe, he tells Gaby he has written the date of Pepe's arrest on his wall. The next day, Regis meets with Chief Inspector Louvain and schemes to have Pepe's friend Pierrot arrested, hoping to capture Pepe. Regis delivers a letter to Pierrot, purportedly written by his mother, to state she is ill. Meanwhile, Gaby has been thinking about Pepe, despite being engaged to her older fiancé Giraux. While dining, Slimane tells Gaby about Pepe's adoration of jewelry, and arranges to have her see Pepe again.

Later that night, Pepe is informed that Pierrot has left Algiers. Pepe questions Regis about Pierrot's disappearance. While Regis sweats over his fate, Pepe reunites with Gaby, where they bond over their love for Paris. Despite Gaby's engagement, they plan to see each other the next day. An injured Pierrot suddenly arrives, wanting to kill Regis. Pierrot collapses as he tries to shoot Regis, who is then killed by one of Pepe's friends.

The next day, Pierrot's funeral is held outside the Casbah, which angers a grief-stricken Pepe. Desperate to attend, Pepe rushes out but Ines prevents him by lying that Gaby is waiting for him at his house. Pepe goes to his residence, but despite her lie, he thanks Ines for making him evade a potential trap. Gaby eventually arrives, and while together, Pepe expresses his frustration as he can never escape the Casbah. Before Gaby leaves, they agree to reunite at her hotel the next day. Meanwhile, Slimane tells Giraux to have Gaby refrain from seeing Pepe. When that fails, Slimane lies to Gaby, stating Pepe has been killed.

Before Pepe leaves to see Gaby at her hotel, he learns from another man named L'Arbi that Gaby and Giraux are leaving Algeria on a steamship that afternoon. As he ignores Ines's warnings, Pepe leaves the Casbah and purchases a steamship ticket. When Pepe is onboard he sees Gaby, but he is arrested by Slimane and his detectives. As Pepe stands on the docks, he rushes towards the ship and calls for Gaby, but she does not see him. One of Slimane's men shoots Pepe and as Slimane cradles his body, he apologizes since the man believed Pepe was trying to escape. Pepe replies, "And so I have, my friend."

== Cast ==
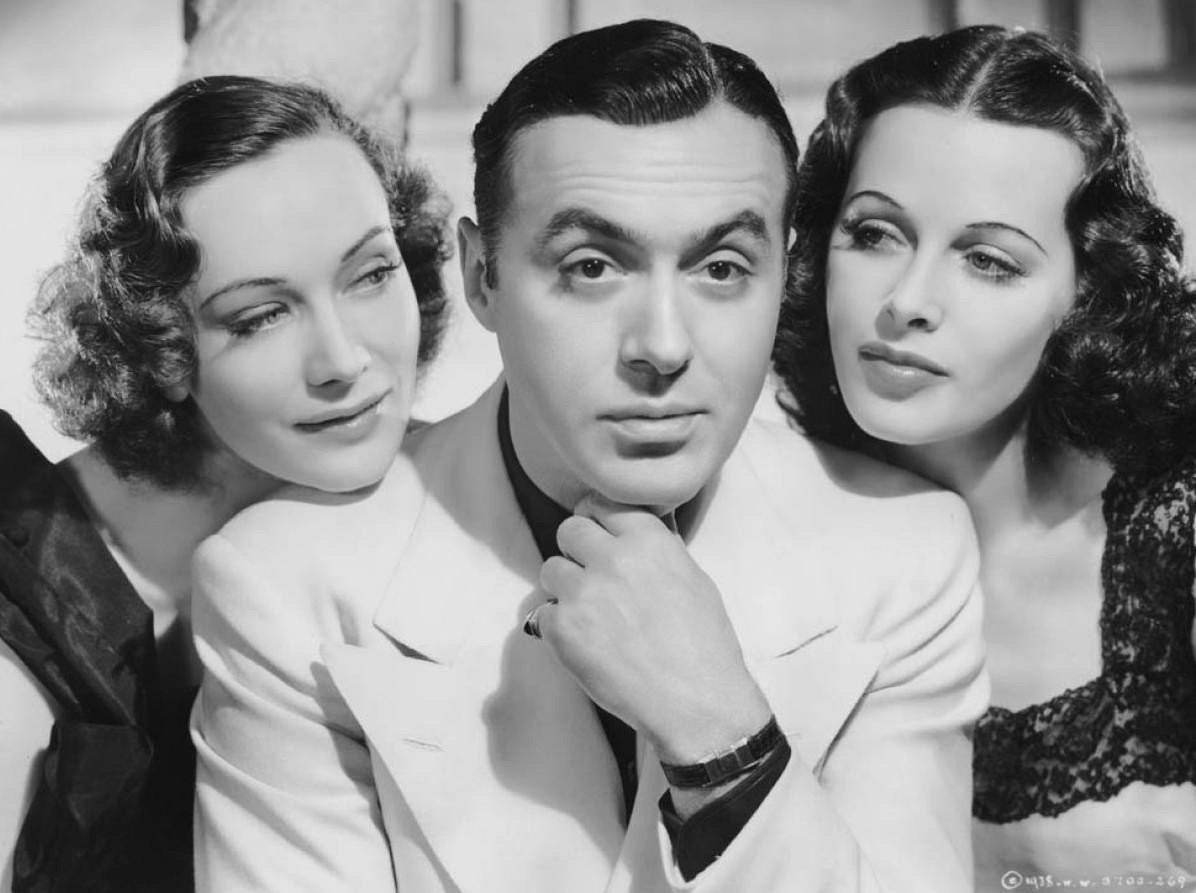
Sigrid Gurie, Charles Boyer, and Hedy Lamarr

- Charles Boyer as Pepe le Moko
- Sigrid Gurie as Ines
- Hedy Lamarr as Gaby
- Joseph Calleia as Inspector Slimane
- Alan Hale as Grandpere
- Gene Lockhart as Regis
- Walter Kingsford as Chief Inspector Louvain
- Paul Harvey as Commissioner Janvier
- Stanley Fields as Carlos
- Johnny Downs as Pierrot
- Charles D. Brown as Max
- Robert Greig as Giraux
- Leonid Kinskey as L'Arbi
- Joan Woodbury as Aicha
- Nina Koshetz as Tania
- Claudia Dell as Marie
- Bert Roach as Bertier
- Ben Hall as Gil

== Production ==
Walter Wanger, the film's producer, purchased the rights to the French film Pépé le Moko, starring Jean Gabin, in order to remake it, and bought all prints of the film to prevent it from competing with his film in the U.S. Wanger used most of the music from the French film in the remake as well as background sequences.

Algiers

The first version of the script was rejected by Joseph Breen, the head of Production Code Administration (PCA), because the leading ladies were portrayed as "kept women," and because of references to prostitution and the promiscuity of the lead character. The PCA objected to Pepe's suicide and demanded a script change; in the film, Pepe is shot dead by the police, who think that he is trying to escape. To tone down the script, Wanger hired James M. Cain to rewrite the first twenty minutes and later John Howard Lawson to intensify the central romance.

Backgrounds and exteriors were shot in Algiers and integrated into the film by cinematographer James Wong Howe.

United Artists had considered Ingrid Bergman, Dolores del Río and Sylvia Sidney for the female lead. Sidney, who was under contract to Wanger, turned down the role. According to Charles Boyer, he met Hedy Lamarr at a party and introduced her to Wanger as a possibility. She was already known for her appearance in the 1933 Czech film Ecstasy, in which she had appeared nude. However, director John Cromwell felt that Lamarr, who was cast in her first Hollywood feature, lacked acting talent, later saying: "After you've been in the business for a time, you can tell easily enough right when you meet them. I could sense her inadequacy, Wanger could sense it, and I could see Boyer getting worried even before we started talking behind Hedy's back. ... Sometimes the word personality is interchangeable with presence although they aren't the same thing. But the principle applies, and Hedy also had no personality. How could they think she could become a second Garbo?...I'll take some credit for making her acting passable but can only share credit with Boyer fifty-fifty."

Boyer did not enjoy his work on Algiers. He later said: "An actor never likes to copy another's style, and here I was copying Jean Gabin, one of the best." Boyer also said that Cromwell "would run a scene from the original and insist we do it exactly that way—terrible, a perfectly terrible way to work." However, Cromwell said that Boyer "never appreciated how different his own Pepe was from Gabin's. Boyer showed something like genius to make it different. It was a triumph of nuance. The shots are the same, the dialogue has the same meaning, but Boyer's Pepe and Gabin's Pepe are two different fellows but in the same predicament."

== Reception ==
=== Box office ===
The film earned $951,801 at the box office, which netted a profit of $150,466 (nearly $3.5 million in 2025).

=== Critical reaction ===
Frank S. Nugent of The New York Times called Algiers "one of the best pictures of the season" and wrote: "The film has been beautifully paced, driven at an accelerating tempo until its suspense becomes almost unbearable, whipped savagely by stinging sequences whenever its action threatens to lag. ... The players have responded brilliantly, of course, but the director's control is always there, and always sure." John C. Flinn of Variety called Algiers "an engrossing tale" that makes "no cheap and unconvincing detours in an effort to moralize over the plight of the hero." Flinn complimented Boyer's performance, as well as Lamarr's performance for bringing "an abundance of good looks, acting talents and enticement."

Edwin Schallert of the Los Angeles Times wrote: "Boyer brings a genuine fervor to his portrayal which is far reaching, and Miss Lamarr a consummate loveliness, which may entitle her to stardom ...Photography is well managed and many scenes are rather brilliantly directed." Time magazine felt the performances by Boyer and Joseph Calleia were "cinememorable." The review also highlighted Hedy Lemarr, writing her performance "may well presage a renewal of the sultry cinema of Garbo and Dietrich."

The Motion Picture Herald wrote Algiers was "a melodramatic romance that concludes tragically, to appear fresh and new and a picture that has no parallel either on the recent or present day screen. Its story is weird. It has a hypnotic quality. Nevertheless it is logical and believable." Harrison's Reports felt the film was "interesting as a psychological study. But as entertainment, it is only fair, for the action is slow. Its appeal should, therefore, he directed more to class audiences than to the masses. The story lacks human appeal; it is difficult to sympathize with a crook, particularly so in this case, for he does not repent his misdeeds."

=== Accolades ===
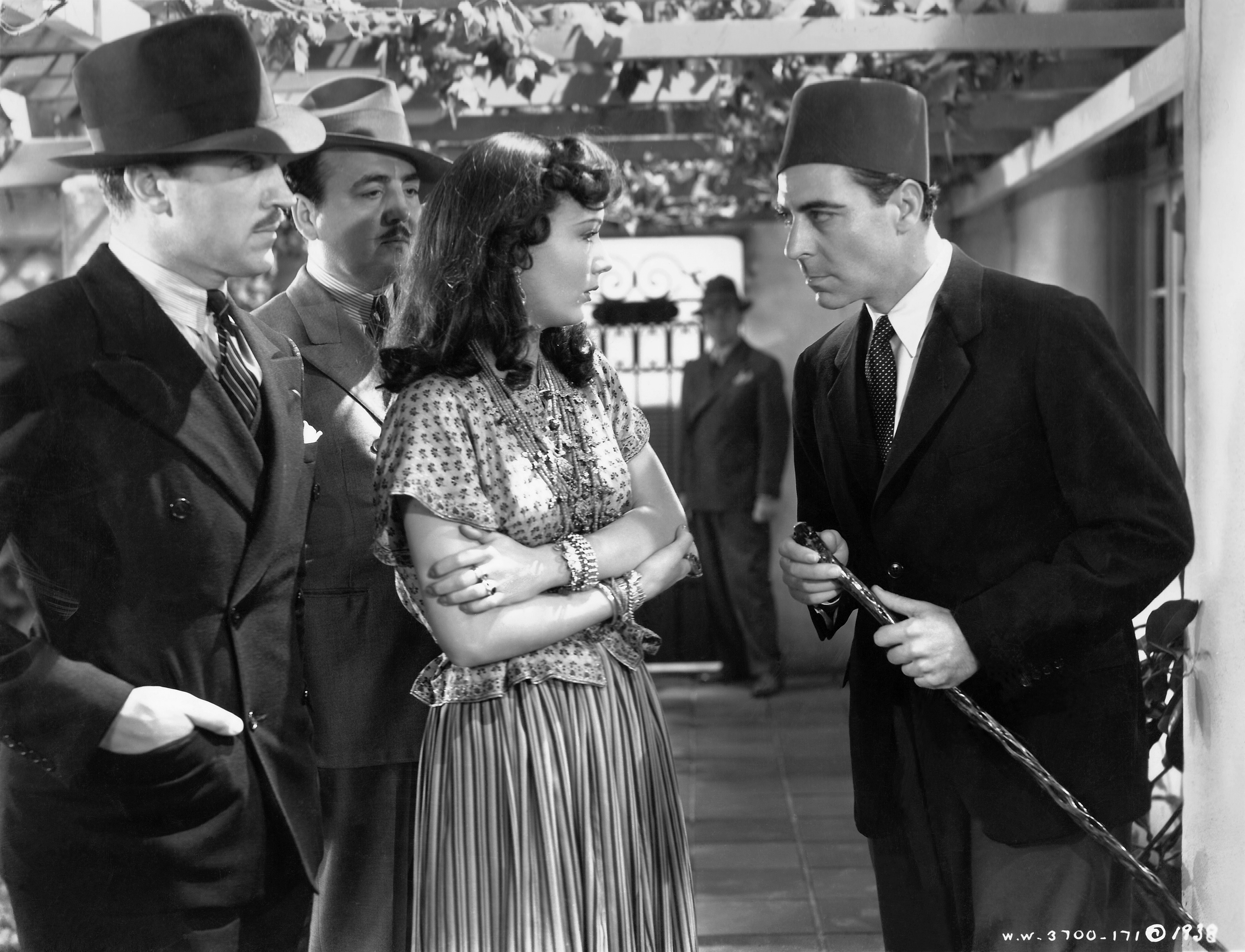
Joseph Calleia (right) in Algiers

Award	Category	Nominee(s)	Result	Ref.
Academy Awards	Best Actor	Charles Boyer	Nominated	
Academy Awards	Best Supporting Actor	Gene Lockhart	Nominated	
Academy Awards	Best Art Direction	Alexander Toluboff	Nominated	
Academy Awards	Best Cinematography	James Wong Howe	Nominated	
National Board of Review Awards	Best Acting	Joseph Calleia	Won	

== Adaptations ==
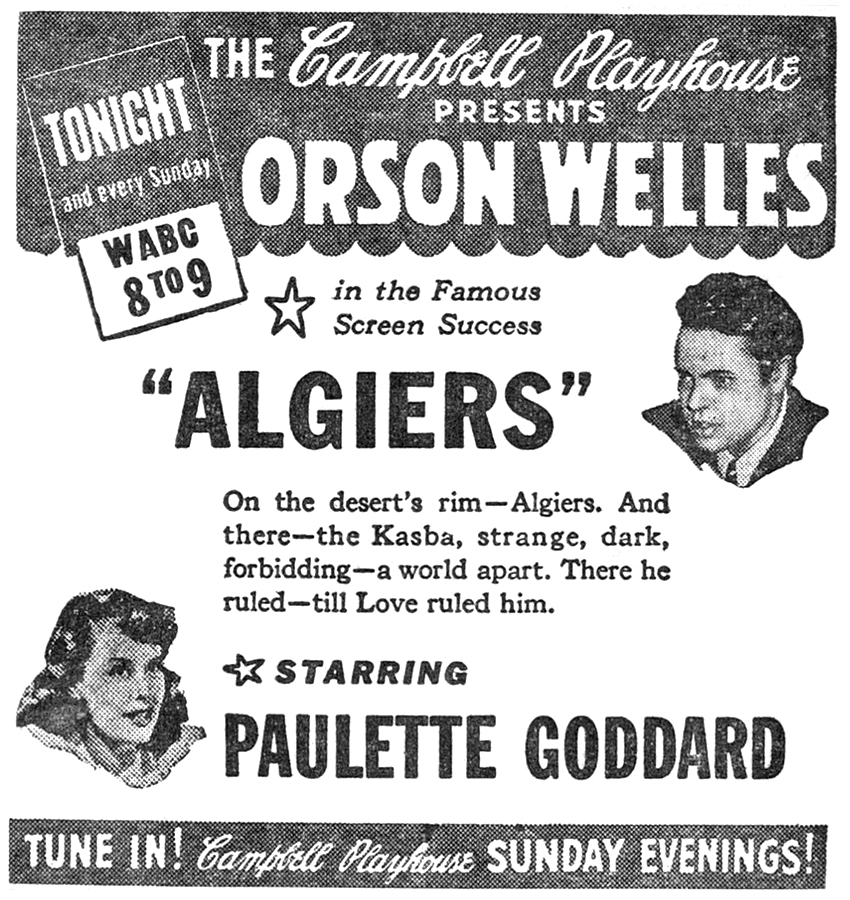
Newspaper advertisement for The Campbell Playhouse presentation of Algiers (October 8, 1939)

=== Radio ===
In the autumn of 1938, Hollywood Playhouse presented a radio adaptation of Algiers starring Charles Boyer.

Algiers was adapted for the October 8, 1939 presentation of the CBS Radio series The Campbell Playhouse. The hour-long adaptation starred Orson Welles and Paulette Goddard, with Ray Collins taking the role of Inspector Slimane.

The film was dramatized as an hour-long radio play on two broadcasts of Lux Radio Theatre. Boyer and Lamarr reprised their roles in the broadcast of July 7, 1941, and Boyer starred with Loretta Young in the broadcast of December 14, 1942.

=== Remake ===
A musical remake of Algiers titled Casbah was released in 1948 by Universal Pictures and starred Tony Martin and Yvonne De Carlo. A 1949 Italian parody titled Totò Le Moko featured the comedian Totò.

== In popular culture ==
The film was most Americans' introduction to the picturesque alleys and souks of the Casbah. It was also the inspiration for the 1942 film Casablanca, written specifically for Hedy Lamarr in the female lead role. When Louis B. Mayer refused to loan her to Warner Bros., the role went to Ingrid Bergman.

The oft-quoted invitation extended by Charles Boyer to "come with me to the Casbah" does not appear in the film, but still became comedians' standard imitation of Boyer, much like "Play it again, Sam" for Humphrey Bogart, "Judy, Judy, Judy" for Cary Grant and "You dirty rat" for James Cagney, all misquotes. Boyer hated the phrase, believing that it demeaned him as an actor. However, the Looney Tunes cartoon character Pepé Le Pew, a spoof of Boyer as Pépé le Moko, did say "Come with me to the Casbah" as a pickup line.

== See also ==
- Casbah (1946)
- The Battle of Algiers (1966)
- List of films in the public domain in the United States

== Bibliography ==
- Barton, Ruth (2010). Hedy Lamarr: The Most Beautiful Woman in Film. Lexington: University of Kentucky Press. ISBN 978-0-8131-3654-7.
- Bernstein, Matthew (2000) [1994]. Walter Wanger, Hollywood Independent. University of Minnesota Press. ISBN 978-0-816-63548-1.
