= Public Hero ﹟1 =

1935 film by J. Walter Ruben

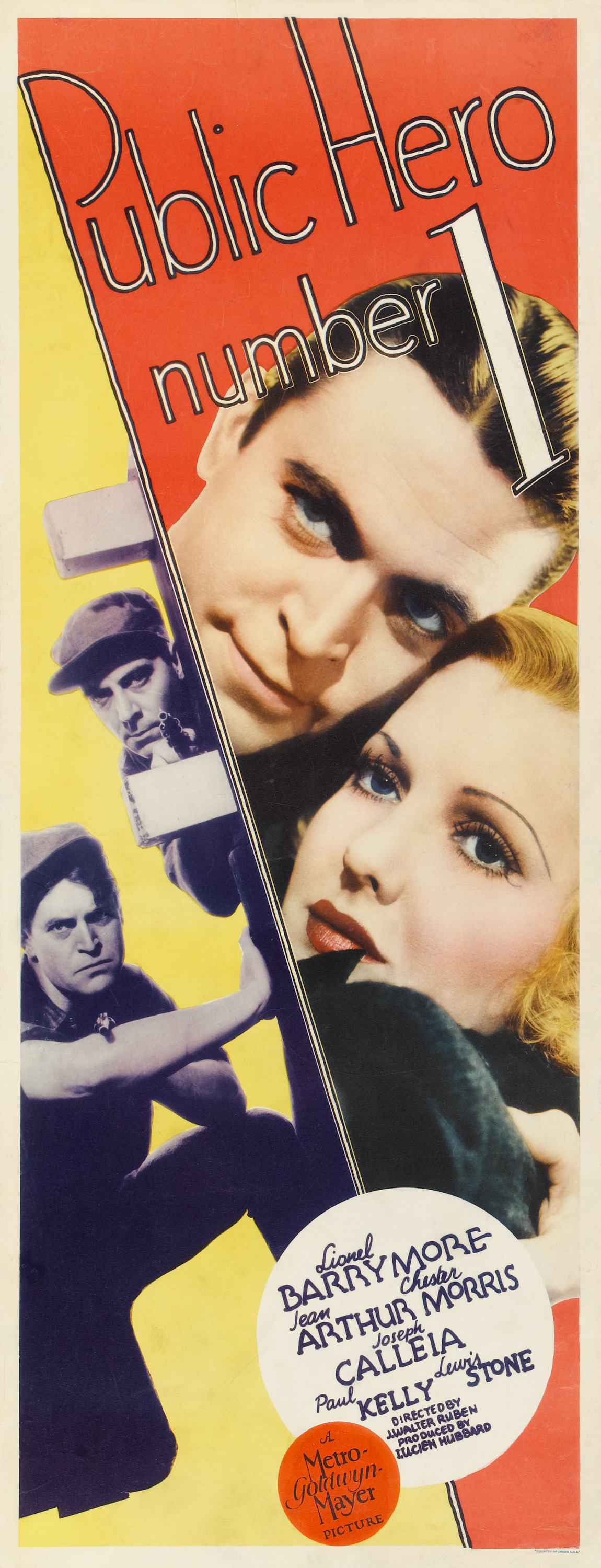
- Directed by: J. Walter Ruben
- Screenplay by: Wells Root
- Based on: Story by J. Walter Ruben and Wells Root
- Produced by: Lucien Hubbard
- Starring: Lionel Barrymore; Jean Arthur; Chester Morris; Joseph Calleia
- Cinematography: Gregg Toland, A.S.C.
- Edited by: Frank Sullivan
- Music by: Edward Ward
- Production company: Metro-Goldwyn-Mayer
- Distributed by: Loew's Inc.
- Release date: May 31, 1935
- Running time: 89 minutes
- Country: United States
- Language: English

Public Hero ﹟1 is a 1935 American crime film starring Lionel Barrymore, Jean Arthur, Chester Morris and Joseph Calleia. The Metro-Goldwyn-Mayer production was directed by J. Walter Ruben.

== Plot ==
Undercover FBI agent Jeff Crane is planted in the same prison as Sonny Black, who is suspected of belonging to the notorious Purple Gang. Jeff helps Sonny escape in the hope that he will lead Jeff to the rest of the gang.

Sonny is seriously wounded during the escape. Once the fugitives reach his home in central Wisconsin, he sends Jeff for Dr. Josiah Glass, an alcoholic who has saved the lives of many of the gang members. In his rush, Jeff forces a bus off the road during a late-night rainstorm. One of the passengers, Maria Theresa "Terry" O'Reilly, badgers him until he takes the stranded people back to town. However, he refuses Terry's persistent requests that he drive her to her destination, only a few miles away.

Jeff finds Dr. Glass, but has to wait because the storm has made a bridge impassible. During that time, he and Terry become acquainted. He learns that she is going to see her brother "Dinkie". She has not seen him in many years, and he has not responded to her letter about his inheritance from their uncle. Jeff is shocked when he sees a photograph of her brother: Dinkie is Sonny. Terry is unaware of Sonny's criminal activity.

When Jeff takes Dr. Glass to Sonny, Terry stows away in the car. She meets Sonny, and learns that he is the subject of a nationwide manhunt. However, family ties are strong, and she helps nurse him back to health. Later, when Sonny slaps Terry for persistently trying to persuade him to turn himself in, Jeff cannot control himself. He punches Sonny. Sonny angrily orders Jeff and Terry to leave, at gunpoint.

Jeff's boss, Special Agent James Duff, had warned Jeff not to get involved with Terry. The whole operation seems to be derailed, so Duff fires Jeff.

However, Jeff has an idea. Knowing that the gang is planning to strike that day, he tricks Dr. Glass into taking him to their hideout, a roadhouse named Little Paree. He notifies Duff, who arranges an ambush. A fierce gunfight ensues. All of the gang members are killed except Sonny, who escapes. A dying Dr. Glass confirms that Sonny was the boss.

Weeks go by, but Sonny eludes capture. A newspaper publishes photographs of Sonny and Jeff side by side—one captioned "Public Enemy No. 1", and the other "Public Hero No. 1". Duff and Jeff learn that Sonny has undergone plastic surgery. Knowing that he must be short of money, they place an advertisement supposedly from Terry offering to provide Dinkie with money. His sister is placed under surveillance at the vaudeville theater where she is the cashier. As hoped, he approaches her for money at the theater and is spotted. Terry warns him, but he is gunned down in an alley by Jeff.

Afterwards, Terry wants nothing to do with her brother's killer. However, Jeff corners her on a train and they reconcile.

== Cast ==
- Lionel Barrymore as Doctor
- Jean Arthur as Maria Theresa "Terry" O'Reilly
- Chester Morris as Jeff Crane
- Joseph Calleia as "Dinkie" O'Reilly aka "Sonny" Black
- Paul Kelly as Duff
- Lewis Stone as Warden
- Paul Hurst as Rufe Parker
- George E. Stone as Butch
- Sam Baker as Mose

Uncredited (in order of appearance)
Selmer Jackson	Simpson - Member of prison board
Ed Brady	Convict
John George	Dwarf convict
Jonathan Hale	Member of prison board
Larry Wheat	Andrews - Member of prison board
William Worthington	Member of prison board
Frank Moran	Moran - Prison guard
John Kelly	Federal agent smuggling gun to prison
Lee Phelps	Tower guard with machine gun
Guy Edward Hearn	Police officer giving chase
Teru Shimada	Sam - Sonny's Japanese houseboy
Greta Meyer	Dr. Glass' German housekeeper
Walter Brennan	Farmer
James C. Morton	Roadhouse patron
Tammany Young	Roadhouse bartender
Dorothy Vernon	Restaurant patron
Brooks Benedict	Roadhouse bar patron
Al Hill	Al - Sonny's henchman
Stanley Price	Sonny's henchman
Jack Pennick	Bus Driver
Cora Sue Collins	Little girl on bus
Bert Roach	Bus passenger annoying Theresa
Russ Powell	MacGinnis - hotel bartender
Arthur Housman	Hotel bar drunk
Zeffie Tilbury	Deaf woman in hotel bar
Dick Elliott	Gas station attendant
Gladden James	Federal agent
William Irving	Federal agent
Pat O'Malley	Federal agent
Bert Moorhouse	Federal agent
James Flavin	Flavin, Federal agent
Billy Sullivan	Federal agent
Frank Darien	Dr. Hale - plastic surgeon
Anderson Lawler	Higgins - Federal agent
Lillian Harmer	Mrs. Higgins
Helene Costello	Woman in vaudeville theater
Frank Rice	Cab Driver
Lane Chandler	Train conductor in final scene
Carl Stockdale	Train conductor in final scene

== Reception ==
Public Hero No. 1 trailer (1935)

New York Times film critic Andre Sennwald called Public Hero ﹟1 "a rattling good show, equally effective in its snarling violence and in its humor", and cited Joseph Calleia's portrayal of the gunman as one of the year's ten best male performances. Writing for The Spectator, Graham Greene described the film as "a conventional but exciting film" and gave specific praise for the acting skills of Chester Morris and Lionel Barrymore whom Greene suggested had given "one of the best performances of his career". Greene's only criticism for the film was that its romantic situation had "spoilt … the realistic subject of 'men on a job'".

== Home media ==
On October 13, 2015, Public Hero ﹟1 was released on Region 1 DVD (manufactured on demand) by the Warner Archive Collection.

== Remake ==
Public Hero ﹟1 was remade in 1941 as The Get-Away, starring Robert Sterling, Dan Dailey and Donna Reed. Edward Buzzell directed the MGM film, which was produced by J. Walter Ruben, director of the original film.

== See also ==
- Lionel Barrymore filmography
