= Eva Condon =

American actress

- Born: September 26, 1880
- Died: September 25, 1956 (aged 75)
- Occupation: Actress

Eva Condon (1880–1956) was an actress of the Broadway stage and vaudeville, from the early to mid 20th century.

== Stage career ==
She resolved to pursue acting at the age of 16. Condon graduated from Hunter College before becoming an understudy in the John Drew Jr. company for several seasons. Her ambition was to excel in high comedy. Her first appearance was in Columbia, South Carolina in A Single Man. She portrayed a villainess in a Thais Lawton role.

Condon acted in Too Many Cooks at the 39th Street Theater in February 1914. This was her favorite theatrical production. Written by Frank Craven, the comedy featured its author in the part of the home builder. The following October she was in The Moneymakers at the Booth Theatre on Broadway. The play was written by Charles Klein who was once in the British Army and helped protect Westminster Abbey.

In 1930–31 Condon played the role of Mrs. Amos Evans in the touring production of Strange Interlude, a nine-act, Pulitzer Prize winning play by Eugene O'Neill. At the American Theater in St. Louis, Missouri Condon was with a troupe that performed You Can't Take It with You in November 1938. She had the role of Penny, the playwriting mother. Clarence Oliver headed a cast which was replete with some of Broadway's best actors.

In 1947 she appeared as a nun in an orphanage opposite Victor Mature in Henry Hathaway's Kiss of Death (1947).

She appeared with Katharine Cornell and Tyrone Power in The Dark Is Light Enough in 1955.

In vaudeville Condon paired with Florence Nash. In motion pictures she performed with Madge Kennedy.

== Select theatre credits ==
- 1910: The Other Fellow
- 1912: C.O.D.
- 1922: Spite Corner
- 1923: Icebound
- 1924: The Best People
- 1926: Move On
- 1928: Gods of the Lightning
- 1934: Small Miracle
- 1935: The Hook-up
- 1940: Higher and Higher
- 1943: The World's Full of Girls
- 1949: The Closing Door
- 1955: The Dark Is Light Enough
