= Four Hours to Kill! =

1935 film

- Theatrical release poster (Spain)
- Directed by: Mitchell Leisen
- Written by: Norman Krasna
- Based on: Small Miracle (play) by Norman Krasna
- Produced by: Arthur Hornblow Jr.
- Starring: Richard Barthelmess
- Cinematography: Theodor Sparkuhl
- Edited by: Doane Harrison
- Distributed by: Paramount Pictures
- Release date: April 11, 1935
- Running time: 70 minutes
- Country: United States
- Language: English

Four Hours to Kill! is a 1935 American drama film directed by Mitchell Leisen and starring Richard Barthelmess.

== Plot ==
Taft, a policeman, has fugitive murderer Tony Mako in custody and in handcuffs, two thousand miles from the prison from which Mako escaped. With four hours to kill, Taft takes his prisoner to a theater where an unfaithful schemer named Mae is a hostess.

Mae is the wife of Anderson, the man who informed on Mako. She is trying to extort $200 from coat-check kid Eddie, insinuating she is pregnant. Eddie doesn't want his fiancée Helen to hear this, true or otherwise, so he tries to raise the money to pay Mae's blackmail. Eddie is also suspected of stealing an expensive piece of jewellery from an adulterous couple.

Mako made the journey this far in the hope of gaining revenge against Anderson. After telling Taft he would prefer a quick death to a painful execution, Mako breaks free and shoots Anderson before being shot by Taft, dying the kind of death he wanted. Eddie is cleared and now free to marry Helen, while Mae is taken away to jail.

== Cast ==
- Richard Barthelmess as Tony Mako
- Joe Morrison as Eddie
- Gertrude Michael as Mrs. Sylvia Temple
- Helen Mack as Helen
- Dorothy Tree as Mae Danish
- Roscoe Karns as Johnson
- Ray Milland as Carl Barrett
- Charles C. Wilson as Taft
- Henry Travers as Mac Mason
- Noel Madison as Anderson
- Paul Harvey as Capt. Seaver
- Olive Tell as Mrs. Madison
- Lee Kohlmar as Pa Herman

== Production ==
Paramount bought the film rights to the stage play in December 1934.

== Reception ==
The New York Times called it "a gripping, although extremely theatrical, melodrama with a neatly dovetailed plot, a uniformly excellent cast and well paced direction".

== Proposed remake ==
In 1944 Paramount Pictures announced it would create a new film adaptation of Small Miracle, the play that was the basis of Four Hours to Kill. Leisen was to direct the new version; Alan Ladd in the lead. The project was not realized.

In 1947 Jack LaRue presented a stage version.
