= Broadway (1942 film) =

1942 film by William A. Seiter

- Directed by: William A. Seiter
- Screenplay by: Felix Jackson; John Bright adaptation Bruce Manning
- Based on: the Jed Harris stage production by Philip Dunning & George Abbott (play)
- Produced by: Bruce Manning
- Starring: George Raft; Pat O'Brien
- Cinematography: George Barnes
- Edited by: Ted J. Kent (as Ted Kent)
- Music by: Frank Skinner
- Color process: Black and white
- Production company: Universal Pictures
- Distributed by: Universal Pictures
- Release date: 1942
- Running time: 91 minutes
- Country: United States
- Language: English
- Box office: $1.1 million

Broadway is a 1942 American crime drama musical film directed by William A. Seiter and starring George Raft and Pat O'Brien. The supporting cast features Janet Blair and Broderick Crawford.

Another fictionalized biographical movie based on Raft's life, The George Raft Story (1961), featured a different actor (Ray Danton) playing Raft.

== Plot ==
George Raft, a Hollywood dancer, returns to Manhattan and recalls working in a nightclub with a bootlegger's girlfriend.

== Cast ==
- George Raft as George Raft
- Pat O'Brien as Dan McCorn
- Janet Blair as Billie Moore
- Broderick Crawford as Steve Crandall
- Marjorie Rambeau as Lillian (Lil) Rice
- Anne Gwynne as Pearl
- S. Z. Sakall as Nick
- Edward Brophy as Porky (as Edward S. Brophy)
- Marie Wilson as Grace
- Gus Schilling as Joe
- Ralf Harolde as Dolph
- Arthur Shields as Pete Dailey
- Iris Adrian as Maisie
- Janet Warren as Ruby (as Elaine Morey)
- Dorothy Moore as Ann
- Nestor Paiva as Rinalti
- Abner Biberman as Trado
- Damian O'Flynn as Scar Edwards
- Mack Gray as Mack 'Killer' Gray

== Production ==
Universal paid $175,000 for the rights to the 1926 play of the same name that had previously been filmed in 1929. On Broadway, Lee Tracy played the dancer, Thomas Jackson played the detective and Paul Porcasi played the nightclub owner. In the 1929 film, Jackson and Porcasi reprised their roles and Glenn Tryon replaced Tracy. Pat O'Brien once played the detective role in a road show.

In February 1941, Universal announced the film for the coming year. Bruce Manning, a writer who had recently been promoted to producer, would produce and George Raft and Broderick Crawford would star. Manning and Felix Young were to write the screenplay.

However, Raft was under contract for three more pictures with Warner Bros., which refused to loan him to Universal. Raft had been refusing roles that he did not like over the course of eight months, but an agreement was reached whereby $27,500 would be taken from Raft's salary to allow Warner Bros. to borrow Robert Cummings from Universal. In December 1941, Raft signed on to make the film.

Manning wanted to change the bootlegger characters from the play into foreign agents. He discussed the story with Raft and recognized the similarities between the story of Roy, the dancer played on stage by Tracy, and that of Raft's early career. He kept the characters as bootleggers but changed the story to focus on Raft. He also added a prologue and epilogue in which Raft returns to New York after establishing himself as a movie star.

In February 1942, O'Brien signed on and filming began.

== Reception ==
The film was a success with audiences.

The Los Angeles Times called Broadway a "sock melodrama." Filmink said that the film "... isn’t particularly well remembered but it's a lot of fun, with plenty of gunfire and dancing, and was reasonably popular – Raft was best known for his gangster movies, but he was also a half-decent draw in musicals."
