= Coquette (play) =

1927 play by George Abbott and Ann Preston Bridgers

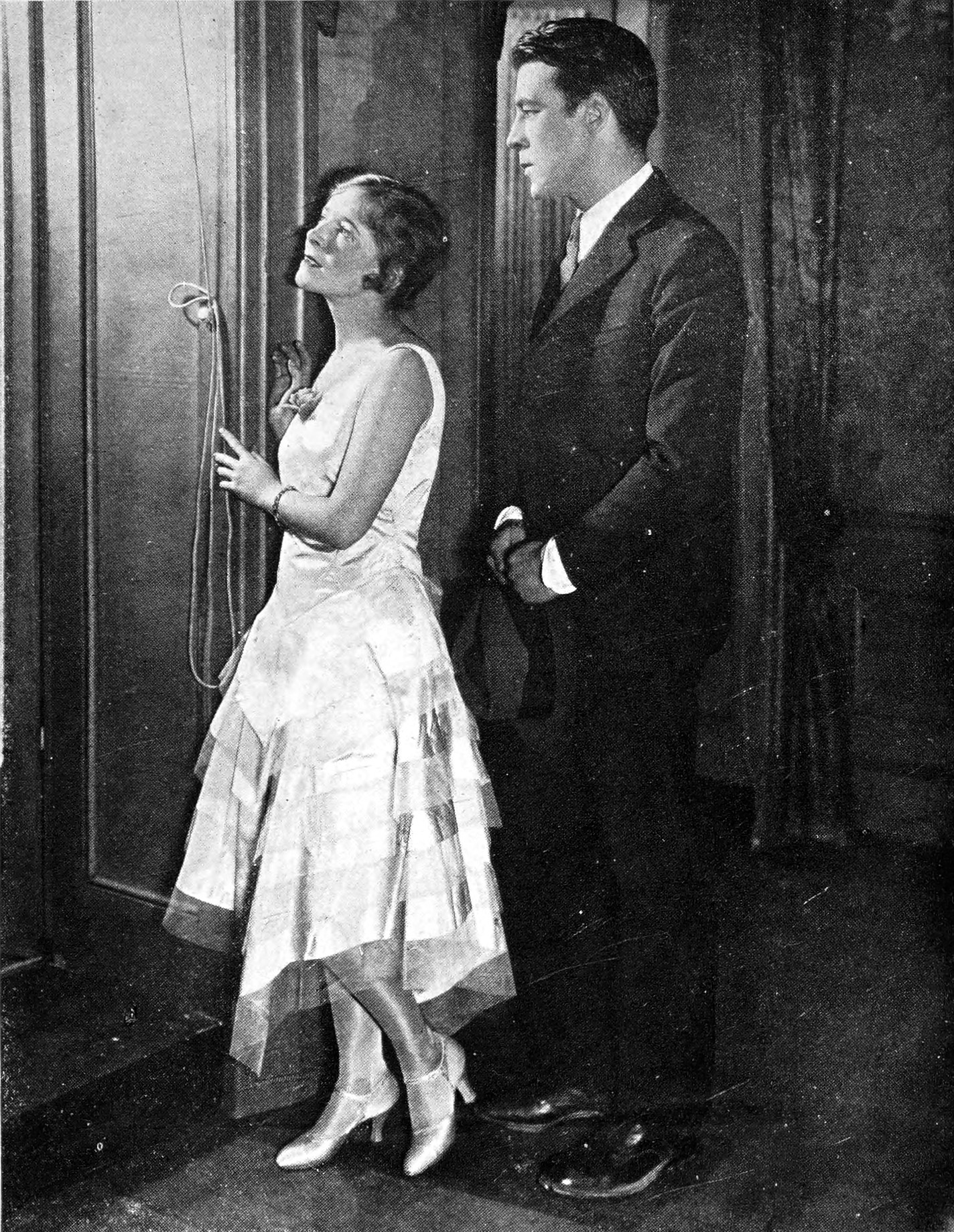
- Helen Hayes and Elliot Cabot
- Original language: English
- Written by: George Abbott and Ann Preston Bridgers
- Subject: Southern honor killing
- Genre: Tragedy
- Setting: Living room of a large house in a small Southern town

Premiere
- Date: November 8, 1927
- Place: Maxine Elliott's Theatre
- Directed by: George Abbott
- Original run: 366 performances

Coquette is a 1927 play by George Abbott and Ann Preston Bridgers. It is a three-act tragedy, with a single setting and eleven speaking characters. The action of the play takes place over seven months time. The story concerns a smalltown belle of good family who falls in love with an unsuitable young man.

The play was produced by Jed Harris in association with Crosby Gaige. Originally directed by George Cukor, it was restaged by author George Abbott before the first public performance. Scenic design was by Raymond Sovey. Coquette starred Helen Hayes, with Charles Waldron, Elliot Cabot, and Una Merkel. It had tryouts in Atlantic City and Philadelphia during October 1927, premiering in Manhattan during November 1927, where it ran through September 1928, for 366 performances. Burns Mantle included Coquette among the top ten plays in The Best Plays of 1927-28.

Coquette was adapted for a 1929 United Artists early sound film of the same name.

== Characters ==
Characters are listed in order of appearance within their scope.

Lead

- Norma Besant is 21, a pretty smalltown girl, charming, flirtatious, and mendacious.

Supporting

- Jimmie Besant is 17, Norma's brother, a bit resentful about her fickleness.
- Dr. Besant is Norma's father, a widower and kindly gentleman, but with a rigid moral code.
- Stanley Wentworth is in love with Norma, but she prefers him as a good friend.
- Michael Jeffery is a shell-shocked veteran; idle, dissolute, supported by his sisters.

Featured

- Betty Lee Reynolds is 18, a shy girl who Norma tries to steer Stanley towards in vain.
- Mr. Wentworth is Dr. Besant's attorney and friend, and Stanley's father.
- Julia is a Black servant in Dr. Besant's household who is close to Norma.
- Joe Reynolds is Betty's younger brother, a friend and classmate of Jimmie.
- Ethel Thompkins
- Ed Forsythe is the local elected sheriff and another friend of Dr. Besant.

== Synopsis ==
Act I (Living room of Dr. Besant's home. September, early evening.) Jimmie, Dr. Besant, and Stanley Wentworth discuss Norma's refusal to settle on one man. Jimmie resents her curtailing of his second helpings at dinner, so she has tidbits to feed her evening callers. Stanley dotes on her but she will not take him seriously, in part because her father favors him as suitor. Norma's latest beau is ne'er-do-well Michael Jeffery, which alarms Dr. Besant. Norma tries to paint a brighter picture of Michael, coercing Stanley to support her, but betrays her interest and arouses her father's suspicions. Later, Norma upsets Stanley by breaking their dance date so she can go with Michael, and persuades him to take Betty instead. Betty is staying with the Besant's temporarily, so Norma helps her try on a dress for the dance, her first. Mr. Wentworth comes to advise Dr. Besant that Michael Jeffery was involved in a fight on Main Street with a former beau of Norma, who called her a "coquette". Michael calls early on Norma; he cannot take her to the dance because he lacks a dress suit. Norma is unused to being turned down, but quickly rallies and puts Michael on the defensive. A confrontation between Dr. Besant and Michael is averted when Norma fibs and says a patient telephoned about a sick baby. Nevertheless, Dr. Besant forbids Michael to see Norma again. Michael and Norma confess their love for each other. Michael tells Norma he will go away for six months to work with a surveying party in the hills, and return only when he has made enough money for them to marry. (Curtain)

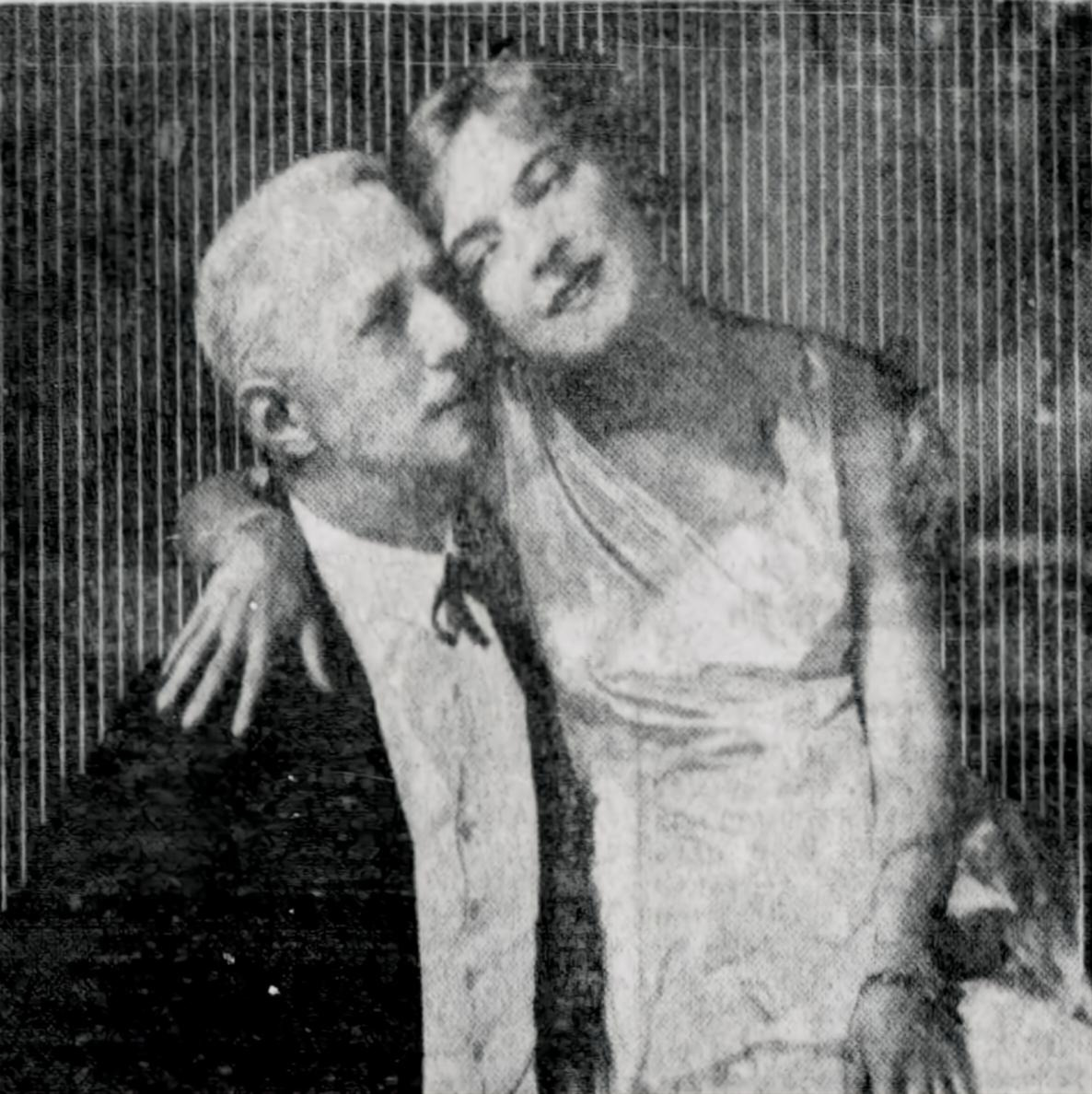

Act II (Same as Act I. A bright morning, three months later.) Stanley calls on Norma, but Betty Lee will not let him see her. Norma is moody and upset, for Michael came back unexpectedly last night to the Country Club dance. He had been drinking, and after she cut other partners to dance with him, the two of them left the dance. A friend of Betty saw them driving around at 3am, so Norma must have come home very late. Later, Dr. Besant calls out Jimmie for coming home at 4am and making so much noise. Jimmie says nothing; he actually got in at 12:30am, but allows his father to believe otherwise. Jimmie scolds his sister for chancing her reputation like that, but Norma is unrepenetant. However, she grows anxious as Dr. Besant draws Betty Lee aside to have a little talk. When Michael rings the bell, the other young people clear off to let him speak with Norma alone. From their conversation it is clear they have been intimate. Michael is determined they shall marry today, but Norma pleads with him to let her deal with father. A sternly cold Dr. Besant comes in to accuse Norma of disobeying him and Michael of putting her at risk. He orders Michael out, but the young man will not go without saying his piece. He is intemperate and hotheaded, and reveals all in his rage, before rushing out. Dr. Besant orders Julia to take Norma to her room, and commands Jimmie to take care of Norma, for he will soon no longer be there. Taking a pistol from the matched set in the drawer of a side table, he goes out of the house. It is Stanley who takes the news to Norma; her father has shot and killed Michael, and turned himself in to the law. Norma rages against her father for killing the man she loved, and scorns Mr. Wentworth's advice to say she resented Michael's attention. Growing hysterical, she vows to let her father hang. (Curtain)

Act III (Same as Act I. A cold day in March.) Norma and Jimmie have returned home from their father's ongoing trial. They are both discouraged, and Norma expresses remorse for having precipitated this crisis. Joe Reynolds tells Jimmie that sentiment is running against his father, especially as he is being permitted to remain under house arrest, with Sheriff Forsythe transporting him each day to court. Mr. Wentworth, as defense counsel, advises Norma that the District Attorney may subpeona her if the defense does not call her as a witness. Michael having been a veteran, the local Legion post has joined the press in pushing for a tough prosecution. Norma is scared of testifying, and when Wentworth explains the crux of the trial hangs on whether the jury believes her to be pure, she becomes hysterical. Her father has an unwritten right to defend a virgin daughter, but if she is found morally wanting it is murder. Controlling herself, Norma asks Wentworth to return after dinner. She summons Stanley and confesses to him she is carrying Michael's child. After swearing him to secrecy and sending him away, she takes the other pistol from the side table drawer and hides it in her pocket book. As Forsythe brings her father home, Norma intercepts him and asks him to be kind to her. They embrace, and he goes to his study. Norma chats inanely with Betty Lee and Jimmie, excusing herself after a few minutes. A shot is heard from the dining room, followed by screams and shouts. Norma has killed herself, to save her father from conviction once her condition is known. (Curtain)

== Original production ==
=== Background ===
According to Burns Mantle, the genesis of Coquette began with Ann Preston Bridgers playing the Cigarette Girl in the 1926 hit show Broadway, which George Abbott co-authored and directed. Bridgers, a graduate of Smith College, told Abbott about a story from her native North Carolina that formed the basis for Coquette. Mantle said Bridgers supplied the background and personalities of the characters, with Abbott doing most of the writing.

George Abbott said in his 1963 memoir that the history of the play went back further. He first met Ann Bridgers when both were touring in a road company for Dulcy around 1922–1923. Abbott also gave more credit to Bridgers, saying Coquette had originally started as a comedy that did not work. Bridgers then had an idea that it would play better as a tragedy and showed Abbott how to change it. Abbott was still on good terms with Jed Harris three months before Broadway had its premiere, so the authors sold their finished play to him. Harris was determined to have Helen Hayes play the title role; he delayed production until she was freed up from a long-running revival of What Every Woman Knows.

For Broadway, Jed Harris partnered with Crosby Gaige, who provided the financial backing. When Broadway became a smashing success, Harris told Abbott that Gaige refused to honor their standing agreement under which Abbott received 1% of gross profits. Abbott was not fooled by this; their relationship became acrimonious, and Abbott refused to direct Coquette. George Cukor was hired to stage it. After rehearsals started, Helen Hayes told Abbott that the play was not going well, and asked him to take over directing. Abbott agreed on condition that Jed Harris stay away from rehearsals, which Helen Hayes persuaded him to do.

=== Cast ===
The cast from the Atlantic City and Philadelphia tryouts through the Broadway run.
Role	Actor	Dates	Notes and sources
Norma Besant	Helen Hayes	Oct 10, 1927 - Sep 15, 1928	
Jimmie Besant	Andrew Lawlor Jr	Oct 10, 1927 - Sep 15, 1928	
Dr. Besant	Charles Waldron	Oct 10, 1927 - Sep 15, 1928	
Stanley Wentworth	G. Albert Smith	Oct 10, 1927 - Sep 15, 1928	A native of Louisville, Kentucky, he served in the US Naval Air Corps during World War I.
Michael Jeffery	Elliot Cabot	Oct 10, 1927 - Sep 15, 1928	
Betty Lee Reynolds	Una Merkel	Oct 10, 1927 - Sep 15, 1928	
Mr. Wentworth	Frederick Burton	Oct 10, 1927 - Sep 15, 1928	
Julia	Abbie Mitchell	Oct 10, 1927 - Sep 15, 1928	
Joe Reynolds	Gaylord Pendleton	Oct 10, 1927 - Sep 15, 1928	
Ethel Thompkins	Phyllis Tyler	Oct 10, 1927 - Sep 15, 1928	
Ed Forsythe	Harlan E. Wright	Oct 10, 1927 - Oct 29, 1927	Wright played the part for the tryouts but was not on the Broadway cast list.
Ed Forsythe	Frank Dae	Nov 08, 1927 - Sep 15, 1928	Dae became available when a Thomas Jackson production called Ten Per Cent failed after a few weeks.

=== Tryouts ===
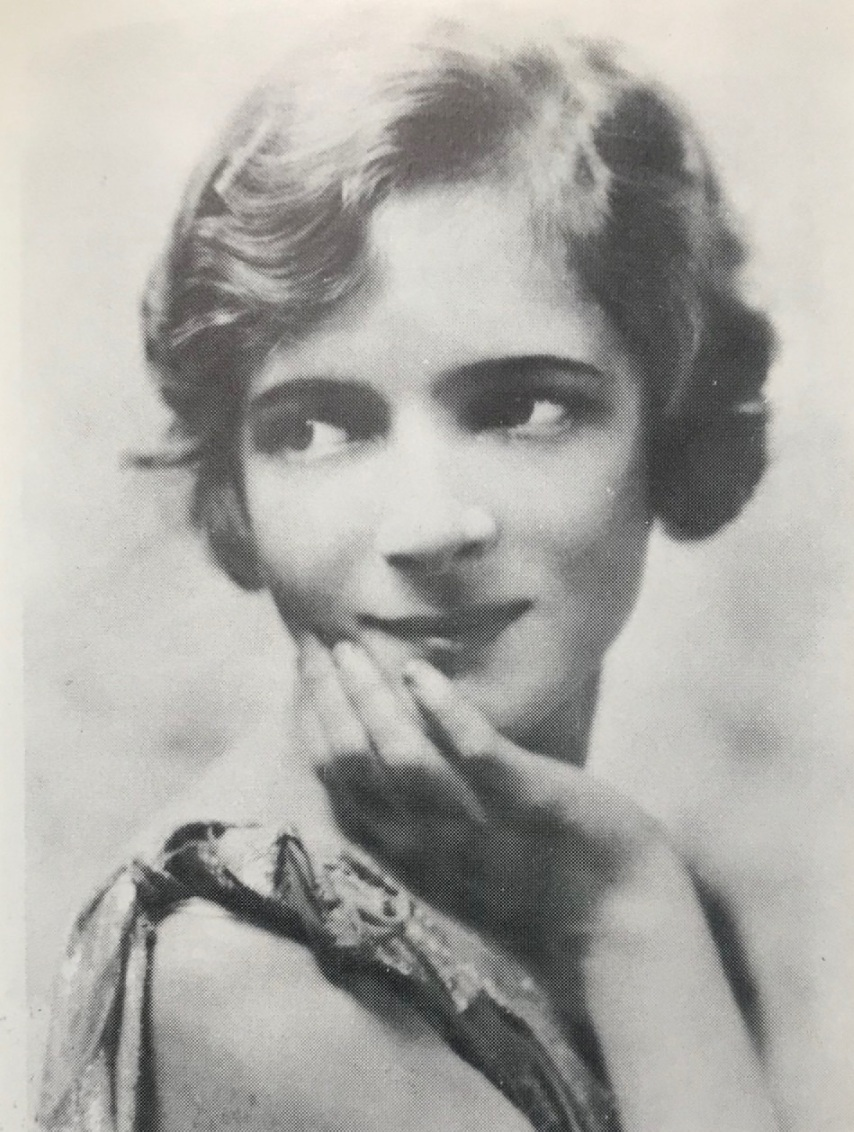
Helen Hayes

Coquette had its first public performance for a tryout at Nixon's Apollo Theatre in Atlantic City, New Jersey starting October 10, 1927. Advertisements and newspaper publicity blurbs initially listed George Cukor as director, but by the end of the week's run specified George Abbott. Local reviewer George R. Weintraub said Helen Hayes "has found a role and not a play worthy of her art", and said "as entertainment Coquette is too tragic and as tragedy it is rather trite".

The production then opened at the Adelphi Theatre in Philadelphia on October 18, 1927. The critic for The Philadelphia Inquirer called it a "fine play, superbly acted" and acknowledged it would have some appeal to the morbid. A reviewer for the Evening Courier said Coquette was "a dull, unimaginative piece of writing, threadbare of plot and burdened down with a load of melodramatic hocus-pocus". Its only merit was the opportunity for Helen Hayes to show her talent, with G. Albert Smith taking second in performance honors.

George Abbott said in his memoir the receptions in Atlantic City and Philadelphia were not good: "To use the actors' phrase, it was a bit heavy for the peasants". Jed Harris now demanded changes, which Abbott resisted, and the play went on Broadway without revision.

=== Broadway premiere and reception ===
“But perhaps it is sufficient to report in the first paragraph that all those associated in the writing, directing and acting of Coquette have woven it into a hauntingly beautiful drama, brimming with loveliness and pathos. Truly, it is difficult to report just how splendid an achievement Coquette appears to be.”
– Brooks Atkinson on Coquette

The production had its Broadway premiere at Maxine Elliott's Theatre on November 8, 1927, with Helen Hayes receiving top billing. Arthur Pollack said "Coquette is silken, brave and beautiful", and when the final curtain came down the audience stayed on in tears, until Helen Hayes came out to give a little speech. He saw Edna Ferber in the audience weeping, and when he left the theater was so moved he forgot to bring his program and couldn't remember G. Albert Smith's name for the review. Rowland Field was equally enthusiastic, calling Coquette "one of the finest and most human dramas that New York has seen in years". Edward Dobson said the play went from comedy through melodrama to tragedy in the successive acts, forming a good drama that would be a success of the season. He said Helen Hayes received an ovation from the first night audience, while Elliot Cabot, G. Albert Smith, Una Merkel, and Charles Waldron were excellent in support.

Burns Mantle included Coquette among the ten best plays of the season in his The Best Plays of 1927-28 annual yearbook of American theater.

=== Broadway closing ===
Coquette closed at Maxine Elliott's Theatre on Saturday, September 15, 1928, after 366 performances.

== Adaptations ==
=== Film ===
- Coquette (1929)

== Bibliography ==
- Burns Mantle (ed). The Best Plays of 1927-28 And The Year Book Of The Drama In America. Dodd, Mead and Company, 1928.
- Burns Mantle (ed). The Best Plays of 1928-29 And The Year Book Of The Drama In America. Dodd, Mead and Company, 1929.
- George Abbott. Mister Abbott. Random House, 1963.
