= Aqueduct Walk =

Public park in the Bronx, New York

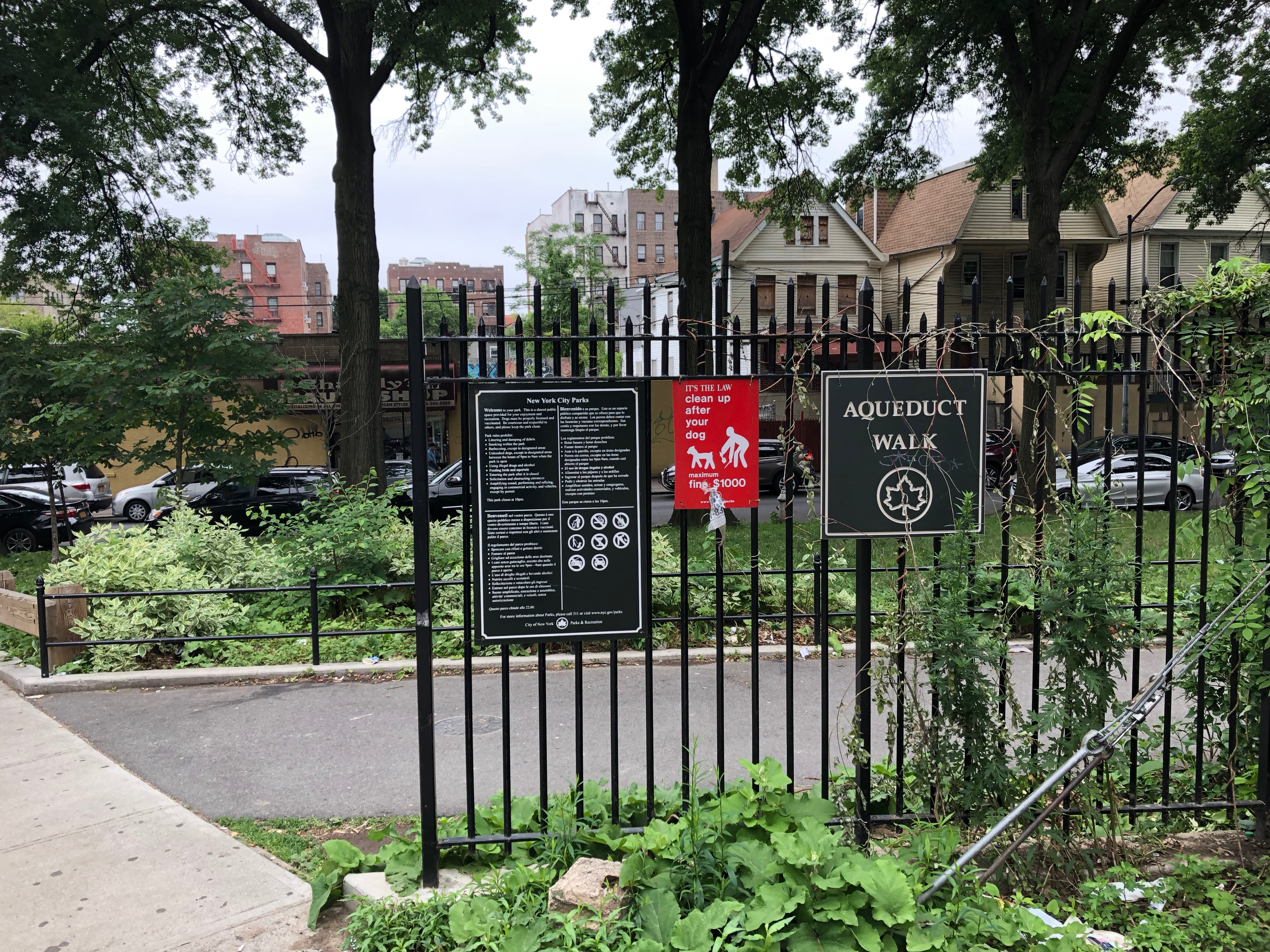
- Interactive map of Aqueduct Walk
- Type: Linear public park
- Location: West Bronx, New York City
- Coordinates: 40.857904°N 73.908441°W
- Operator: NYC Parks
- Status: Open year-round
- Website: nycgovparks.org/parks/aqueduct-walk

U.S. National Historic Landmark
- Designated: 1992
- Reference no.: 74001324
- Designated entity: Croton Aqueduct

U.S. National Register of Historic Places
- Designated: 1992 (Note: The Croton Aqueduct was originally listed on the National Register of Historic Places in 1974, but this originally applied only to the Westchester section, not the Bronx section. Both the Westchester and Bronx sections were designated as National Historic Landmarks in 1992, during which the Bronx section was added to the NRHP for the first time, while the Westchester section was re-added to the NRHP.)
- Reference no.: 74001324
- Designated entity: Croton Aqueduct

New York City Landmark
- Designated: April 16, 2024
- Reference no.: 2673

Aqueduct Walk is a linear public park in the West Bronx in New York City, New York. Operated by the New York City Department of Parks and Recreation (NYC Parks), the park runs on the old Croton Aqueduct route. It stretches about 1.7 miles (2.7 km) between Kingsbridge Road to the north and Tremont Avenue to the south. Aqueduct Walk is a New York City scenic landmark, and the adjacent section of the aqueduct is listed on the National Register of Historic Places as a National Historic Landmark.

Aqueduct Walk includes a series of asphalt trails from Kingsbridge Road to Burnside Avenue. The trails run beside or above an earthen embankment filled with greenery, which conceals the aqueduct tunnel. The park also includes basketball courts, a restroom, playgrounds, and a plaza. Various staircases and ramps connect the park to neighboring streets.

The old Croton Aqueduct was built between 1837 and 1842 to provide freshwater from the Croton River watershed to the Bronx and Manhattan. A section of the aqueduct in the West Bronx ran through an embankment, which was used as a walkway soon after the aqueduct's completion. The city government proposed selling the surviving sections of the aqueduct's right-of-way in 1929, prompting opposition. NYC Parks acquired the surface rights to the land in 1930, and the park opened in 1940 following a renovation designed by the landscape architect Gilmore David Clarke. Over the years, the park has undergone various modifications, including the construction of playgrounds in the 20th century and a plaza renovation in 2019.

== Description ==
Aqueduct Walk is a linear public park in the University Heights and Kingsbridge neighborhoods of the West Bronx in New York City, New York. It stretches 1.7 miles (2.7 km) between Kingsbridge Road in the north and Tremont Avenue in the south. The park is maintained by New York City Department of Parks and Recreation (NYC Parks). It sits atop the old Croton Aqueduct route, which dates from 1842. The park runs parallel to University Avenue to the west, which was known as Aqueduct Avenue from 1886 to 1913. Portions of Aqueduct Walk are paralleled by Aqueduct Avenue East, and the park also runs parallel to Grand and Harrison avenues. Another section of the aqueduct's route in Van Cortlandt Park and Westchester County is also used as a trail, which is known as the Old Croton Aqueduct State Historic Park. That trail, with a substantially greater length of 26 miles (42 km), is physically separate from Aqueduct Walk.

The original Croton Aqueduct was a gravity-fed aqueduct measuring 41 miles (66 km) long, running from Old Croton Dam in Westchester to the boroughs of the Bronx and Manhattan in New York City. Water passed primarily through tunnels, though the aqueduct also ran through embankments, open cuts, and bridges, maintaining a consistent downward slope. The underground portion of the aqueduct contained six weirs, 33 ventilators, and 114 culverts. Within the West Bronx, the aqueduct was fed from the north by the Jerome Park Reservoir. To the south, it traveled directly underneath University Avenue, interrupted by a 600-foot (180 m) siphon beneath the Cross Bronx Expressway. The southern end of the aqueduct's Bronx segment was level with a plateau, where the High Bridge continued west, carrying the aqueduct into Manhattan.

The park spans two zip codes (10453 and 10468) and two Bronx community districts (5 and 7). Its facilities include basketball courts, restrooms, playgrounds, and water sprinklers. Aqueduct Walk was made a New York City scenic landmark in 2024; this designation applies only to the section between Kingsbridge Road and Burnside Avenue. The park, along with the rest of the old Croton Aqueduct in the Bronx, is on the National Register of Historic Places as a National Historic Landmark, having been designated as such in 1992.

=== Trails and embankment ===
The aqueduct structure is mostly underground. The park sits on an earthen embankment with stone retaining walls, which conceals the tunnel. Portions of the retaining walls date to 1930–1940, shortly after the park was established, while other parts of the retaining walls date from the original aqueduct's construction in the 1840s. The embankment has been cut through at several places, where roads cross it from east to west. Within Aqueduct Walk is a concrete and asphalt trail running above the aqueduct tunnel. There are additional trails adjoining Aqueduct Walk at certain points along the route. Two types of lampposts are used: "Type B" lampposts on the trails and "World's Fair" lampposts on the staircases.

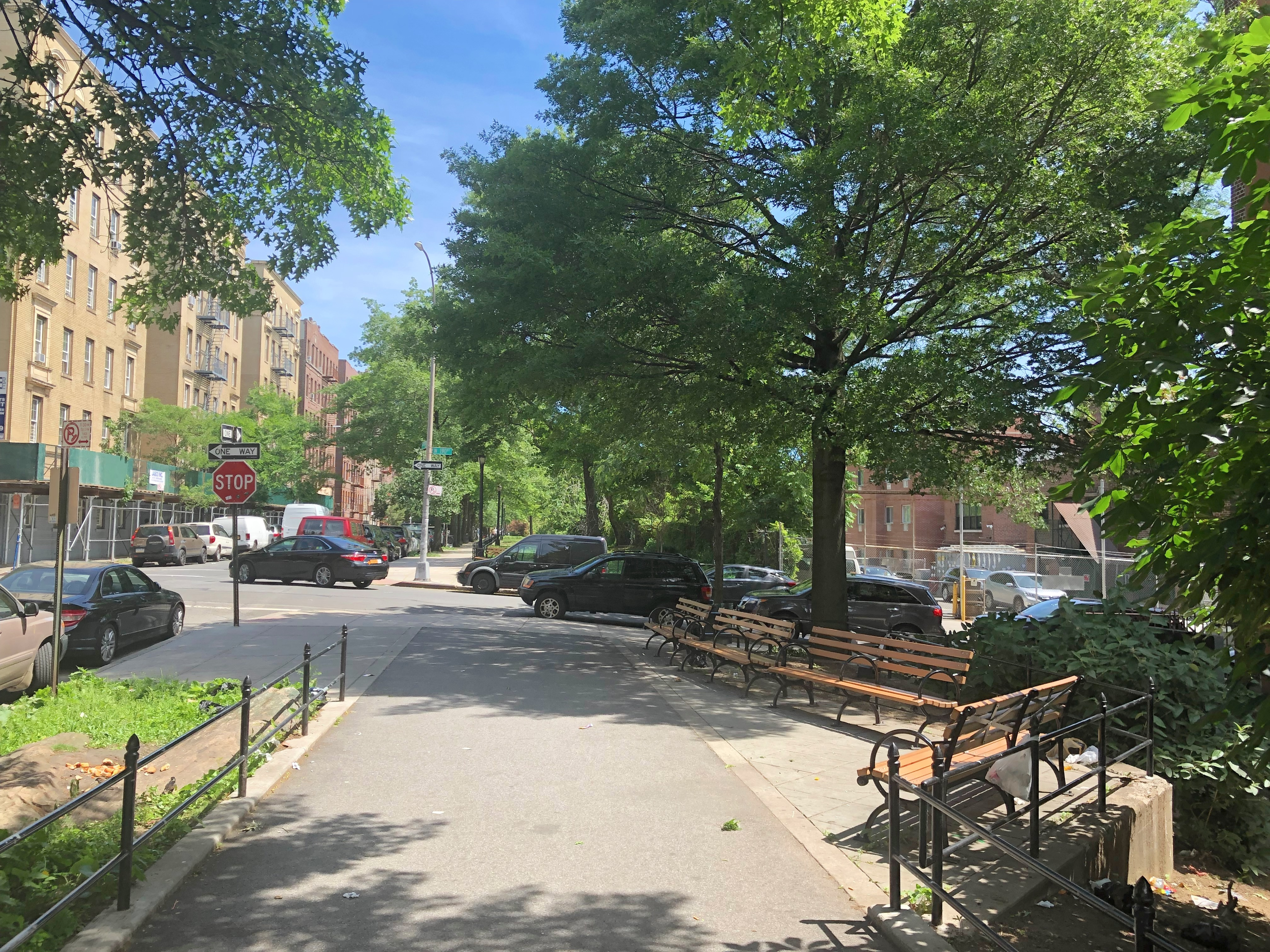
The northern part of the park at 188th Street

Within the northernmost stretch of the park (between Kingsbridge Road and 190th Street), the park itself consists of a grassy strip behind a short fence. There is no trail within this section of Aqueduct Walk; instead, pedestrians use the sidewalk on Aqueduct Avenue directly to the west. There are crosswalks at 192nd and 190th streets, which cut through the grassy strip. South of 190th Street, an asphalt trail rises onto the embankment, with grass and fences on either side. Another asphalt trail, running below the embankment, begins farther south. The two trails intersect the north side of Fordham Road midblock between University and Grand avenues. There is no crosswalk at that location, creating a gap in the trail.

The trail resumes on the south side of Fordham Road, running at ground level, with greenery and fences on either side. Adjoining the trail, a pair of staircases descend from Fordham Road to the sides of the embankment; these areas, though closed to the public, were originally recreational spaces. Staircases descend from the eastern side of the trail at 184th Street and Evelyn Place. There is another short gap at 183rd Street, near the intersection with Aqueduct Avenue East. Continuing south of 183rd Street, the trail rises on an embankment west of Aqueduct Avenue East and is flanked by fences; this embankment runs for two blocks, descending at 182nd Street. From there, the trail merges with the western sidewalk of Aqueduct Avenue East, which intersects with 181st Street. On the south side of the street, several ramps and a staircase lead to the southernmost part of the trail, which splits from Aqueduct Avenue East and rises above the adjacent streets. Near 180th Street, ramps connect with the adjacent streets. Just before the path dead-ends at Burnside Avenue, a staircase descends to street level. The right-of-way continues south of Burnside Avenue, ending at Tremont Avenue.

=== Playgrounds and plaza ===
The park includes playgrounds and a plaza. The playground between 181st and 183rd streets, the Aqueduct Lands Playground, was built in 1938 and has been expanded over the years. It contains a play area and basketball courts, along with a restroom just to the north. This playground has a spray shower with a brick-lined drainage area, which contains inscriptions of the names of towns along the aqueduct's route.

The section of the park between Burnside Avenue and 181st Street contains the Captain Roscoe C. Brown Jr. Plaza, which until 2019 was known as the MLK Plaza. The plaza is located across from Bronx Community College (BCC) immediately to the west, where Brown served as president for 16 years. Near the south end of the park, at Morton Place, is the Morton Playground, built in 1947 and named for a 19th-century landowner. Morton Playground includes plantings, spray showers, a play area, and a basketball court. There is also a provision for a future connection from the Morton Playground to the rest of Aqueduct Walk. Just south of there, between Morton Place and Tremont Avenue, is the Eternal Life Community Garden, which spans 3,600 square feet (330 m^{2}).

== History ==
=== Context ===
The island of Manhattan, surrounded by brackish rivers, originally had numerous small sources of freshwater, including springs, streams, and lakes. All of these had been polluted or eliminated by the 18th century as modern New York City grew. As the city was devastated by cholera in 1832 and the Great Fire in 1835, the inadequacy of the water system of wells and cisterns became apparent, and numerous corrective measures were examined. Efforts to bring freshwater from the Croton River watershed in New York's Hudson Valley, north of the city, commenced in the early 1830s. David Bates Douglass was appointed the chief engineer of what would become the old Croton Aqueduct in 1835; he was replaced by John B. Jervis, who oversaw construction. Work began in 1837 and was divided into four phases; the Bronx portion of the aqueduct was built as part of the third and fourth sections. As many as four thousand laborers constructed the aqueduct for low wages, sometimes going on strike to protest poor working conditions. Surrounding plots were also acquired through eminent domain.

The modern Aqueduct Walk encompasses part of the aqueduct's third section, the construction of which required obtaining land from 11 property owners and was substantially completed in 1841. The aqueduct opened in 1842, supplying fresh water to New York City; it was the city's first direct freshwater supply. The aqueduct's opening dramatically improved the city's hygiene, giving residents access to a steady source of clean water. The old Croton Aqueduct could not keep up with the growth of New York City, and construction on the New Croton Aqueduct began in 1885, lasting five years. Most of the old aqueduct was abandoned in 1917, although a small portion from the Bronx to Manhattan, including the portion under Aqueduct Walk, remained in use.

=== Early use ===
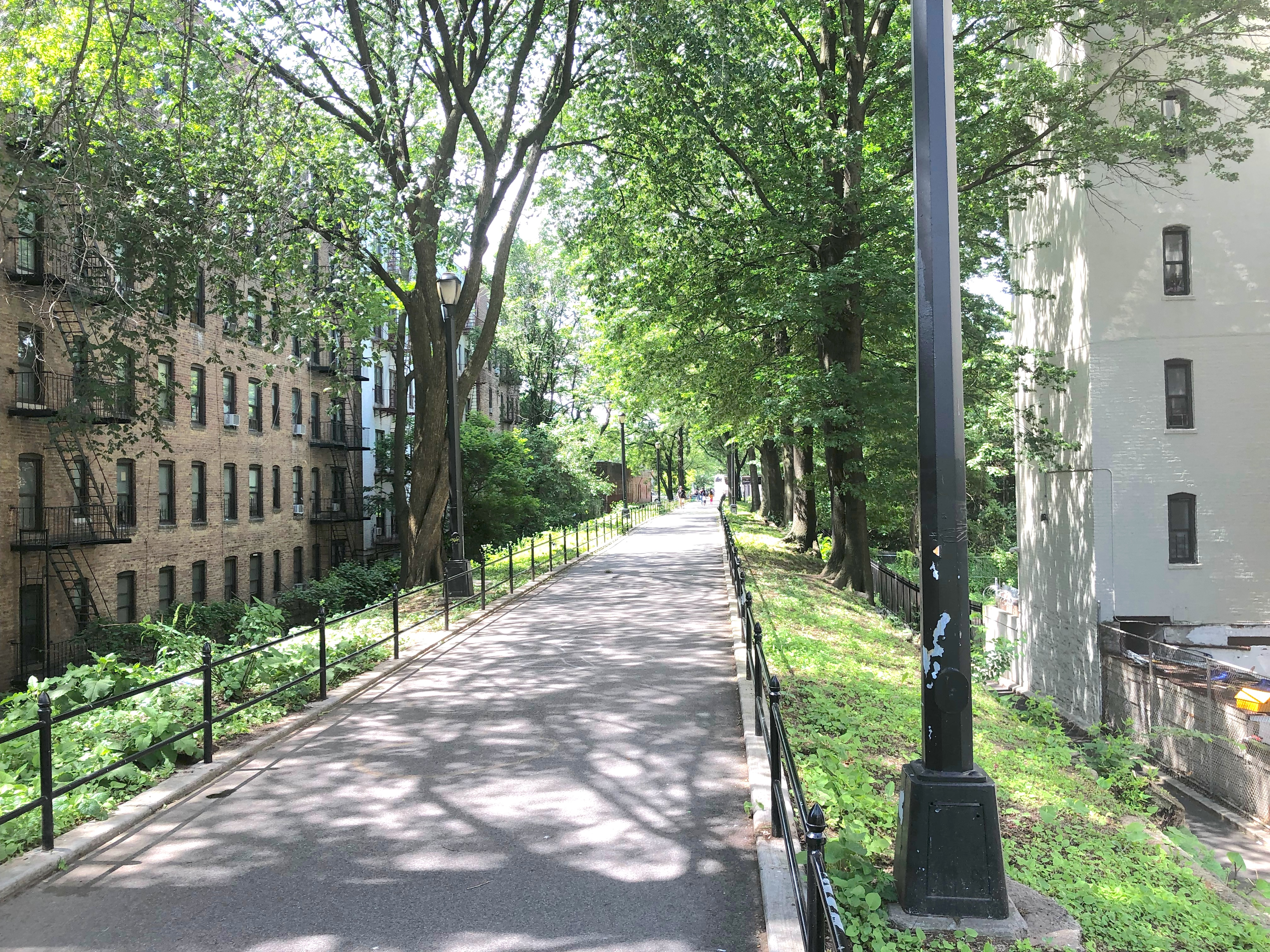
The trail running atop the embankment

A section of the aqueduct in the West Bronx ran on an embankment, which was used as a walkway nearly from the outset. The poet Edgar Allan Poe (who lived in a nearby cottage in Fordham, Bronx) frequently walked along the embankment in the 1840s. The Brooklyn Daily Eagle wrote in 1881 that a path ran along the aqueduct's turf-covered roof, with plantings and greenery scattered about. At this time, the area around the path was still scarcely developed; there were barely any buildings between the High Bridge and Kingsbridge Road approximately 1.5 miles (2.4 km) north.

By the 1890s, the pathway was frequented by bicyclists and was noted as having a smooth surface. The New York World wrote that the path began approximately 0.5 miles (0.80 km) north of the High Bridge, running north from that point. The path was interrupted by walls, fences, and other obstacles at multiple locations, and young cyclists tended to fall down the embankment. A bill to convert the old aqueduct's route to a bike path was introduced to the New York State Legislature in March 1895 and was passed two months later. Mayor William Lafayette Strong also approved a similar measure covering the city section of the aqueduct in May, but Governor Levi P. Morton vetoed the state bill that year. Although the aqueduct already had a walkway, the right-of-way was reserved specifically for one purpose; if the aqueduct closed, ownership would return to the previous owners. The state passed a law in 1896, enabling the government of New York City to acquire adjacent parcels of land "for highway purposes". Cyclists continued to clamor for the construction of a bike path in the late 1890s.

A viaduct was built to carry the aqueduct above Burnside Avenue in 1896, in conjunction with a trolley line being built on that avenue. Following the 1898 establishment of the City of Greater New York, the newly enlarged city's Department of Water Supply (which became the New York City Department of Water Supply, Gas and Electricity, or DSWGE, after 1902) had taken control of the aqueduct. The area around the aqueduct in the West Bronx was developed with apartments beginning in the 1900s, and a trolley line on the nearby Aqueduct Avenue (now University Avenue) was built. (Note: This trolley was replaced with buses c. 1948 and is now the Bx3 route.) During that decade, there were efforts to widen the avenue as part of a parkway. As late as 1909, one local group wrote that the path looked much as it did in Poe's day. The last remaining large tracts of land in the area had been subdivided by the 1910s. Through the early 20th century, the Croton Aqueduct walkway continued to be used for recreational purposes; for example, it was part of the route of a 1920 marathon.

=== Conversion into park ===
The city government proposed selling the surviving sections of the aqueduct's right-of-way in 1929, dividing it into four plots. At the time, the DSWGE owned the land. Former Bronx Country registrar Edward Polak requested that the city not sell the land, and the Bronx Chamber of Commerce and numerous local organizations also opposed the sale. The Park Association of the City of New York requested that the aqueduct's right-of-way be reserved for park purposes. The Park Association requested 30 acres (12 ha) of land, stretching about 1.5 miles (2.4 km) from Kingsbridge Road in the north to a point about 100 feet (30 m) from Tremont Avenue in the south. This stretch ranged from 30 to 60 feet (9.1 to 18.3 m) wide and, according to the group, already contained playgrounds at several spots.

When the lots were auctioned off in July 1929, the developer James P. Connors offered $160,200 for two lots south of Fordham Road. (Note: Equivalent to $2.3 million in 2024) The city comptroller rejected all bids for the Croton Aqueduct lots shortly after, since, as a condition of the auction, the bids could be rejected if a "civic purpose" were proposed for the sites. Following a local committee's recommendation that October, the New York City Department of Parks and Recreation (NYC Parks) obtained the surface rights in 1930. The Department of Water Supply retained ownership of the aqueduct's subsurface portions, since the right-of-way still carried a water line, and NYC Parks could not conduct any significant construction on the embankment. The same year, the viaduct across Burnside Avenue was demolished as part of a plan to widen that street. The Department of Water Supply also built a siphon under Burnside Avenue, constructed stairs to the embankment, and rebuilt the retaining walls at that location.

Part-time laborers were working on improving the park between Kingsbridge Road and Burnside Avenue by 1931. The New York Herald Tribune wrote that the park was "generally improved in the same manner" as Crotona Park in the East Bronx, where workers were re-landscaping the grounds, adding paths and retaining walls, and improving drainage. Initially, the park was known as the "Aqueduct Lands", but by the late 1930s, it was known as "Aqueduct Walk". The actor Elliot Cabot died in 1938 after falling off the park's embankment at Burnside Avenue. Also in 1938, the architect Gilmore David Clarke, who had previously redesigned several of New York City's parks, was hired to redesign the Croton Aqueduct park. Clarke's redesign included new play areas and recreation courts, in addition to landscaping modifications. Benches, fences, and greenery were added, and more retaining walls were built.

=== Park usage ===
==== 20th century ====
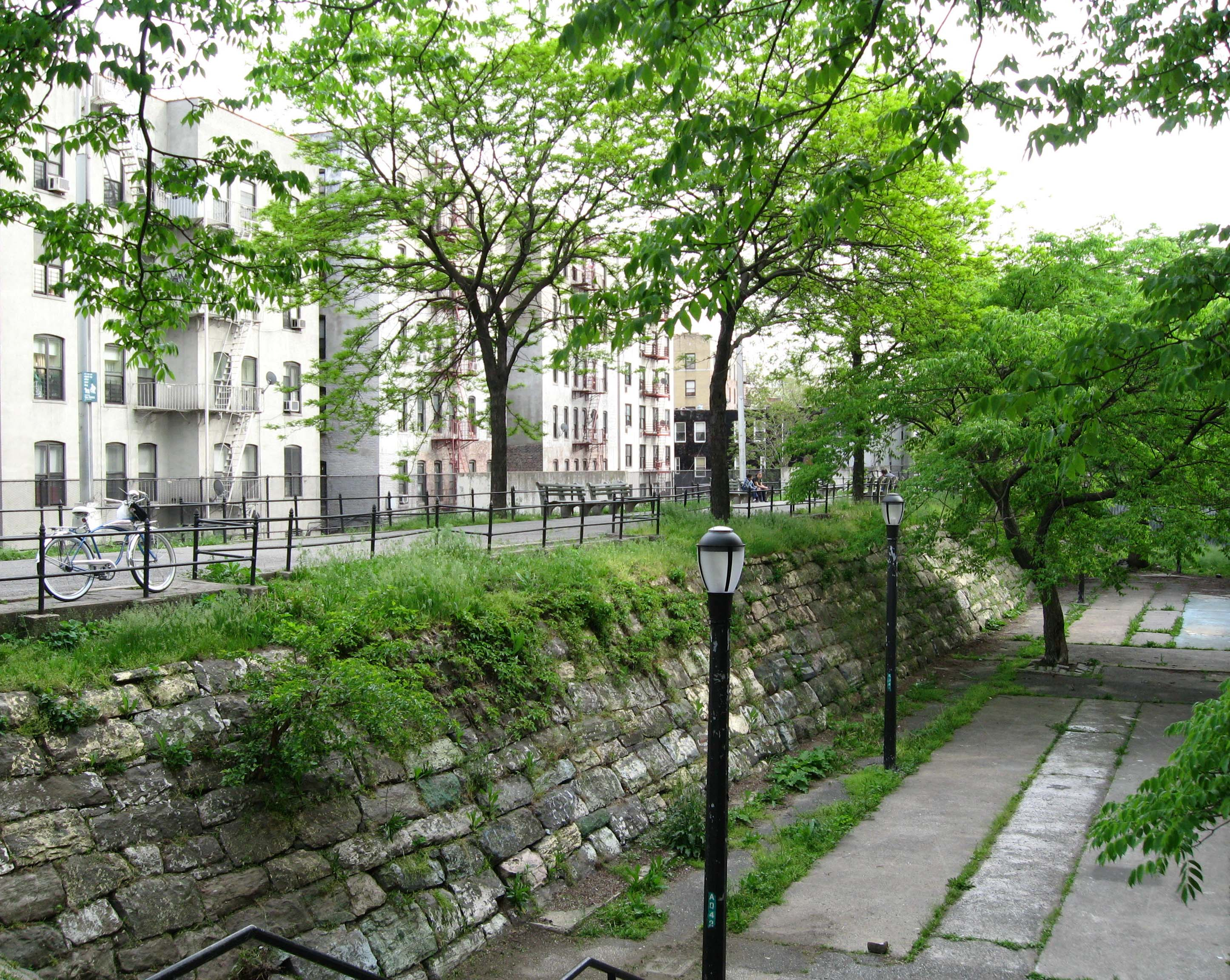
View of retaining walls along the embankment

The park was opened on April 26, 1940. Shortly afterward, another retaining wall was built along the embankment, and the Department of Water Supply built an access point to the siphon under Burnside Avenue. A playground was built at the intersection with Morton Place in 1947. The old aqueduct remained in service until 1955. The park became popular among the local community, and it was used for various games, such as shuffleboard and horseshoe.

Following plans from preservationists to save the old Croton Aqueduct, in 1966, New York Governor Nelson Rockefeller proposed incorporating Aqueduct Walk into a 32-mile (51 km) scenic trail that spanned the aqueduct's route in Westchester and the Bronx. By then, the aqueduct's former route had been divided into several disconnected sections. The city government announced plans in 1967 for a movable playground along Aqueduct Walk. The playground, one of twelve funded by a $402,000 grant (Note: Equivalent to $2.9 million in 2024) from the United States Department of Housing and Urban Development, included movable furniture designed by M. Paul Friedberg. Ultimately, the trail was established in 1968, but it included only the Westchester section and a small segment within Van Cortlandt Park in the far northern Bronx.

One New York Times writer in 1970 said that Aqueduct Walk "preserves the stillness and charming dignity" of the surrounding neighborhood. During the 1970s, there were proposals to extend Westchester's Croton Aqueduct trail down Aqueduct Walk and the High Bridge. Local residents also volunteered to help maintain Aqueduct Walk. By that decade, the park had become rundown, and in 1976, a local group obtained $307,500 (Note: Equivalent to $1.5 million in 2024) from the U.S. government to help maintain the park. Borough President Fernando Ferrer proposed replacing the lighting between Morton Place and Burnside Avenue in the late 1980s.

The Aqueduct Lands Playground at 183rd Street was renovated in 1992 following Paul Simon's concert in Central Park the previous year, which had raised $200,000 (Note: Equivalent to $0.4 million in 2024) for improvements to city parks. By later that decade, Ferrer's office had listed Aqueduct Walk as one of the Bronx's worst-maintained parks. The Bronx parks commissioner refuted Ferrer's claims, saying that, in 1996, one of the park's play areas had been rebuilt. Ferrer's office said the next year that the park still had issues with weeds, litter, vandalism, and broken pavement, as well as a lack of play equipment.

==== 21st century ====
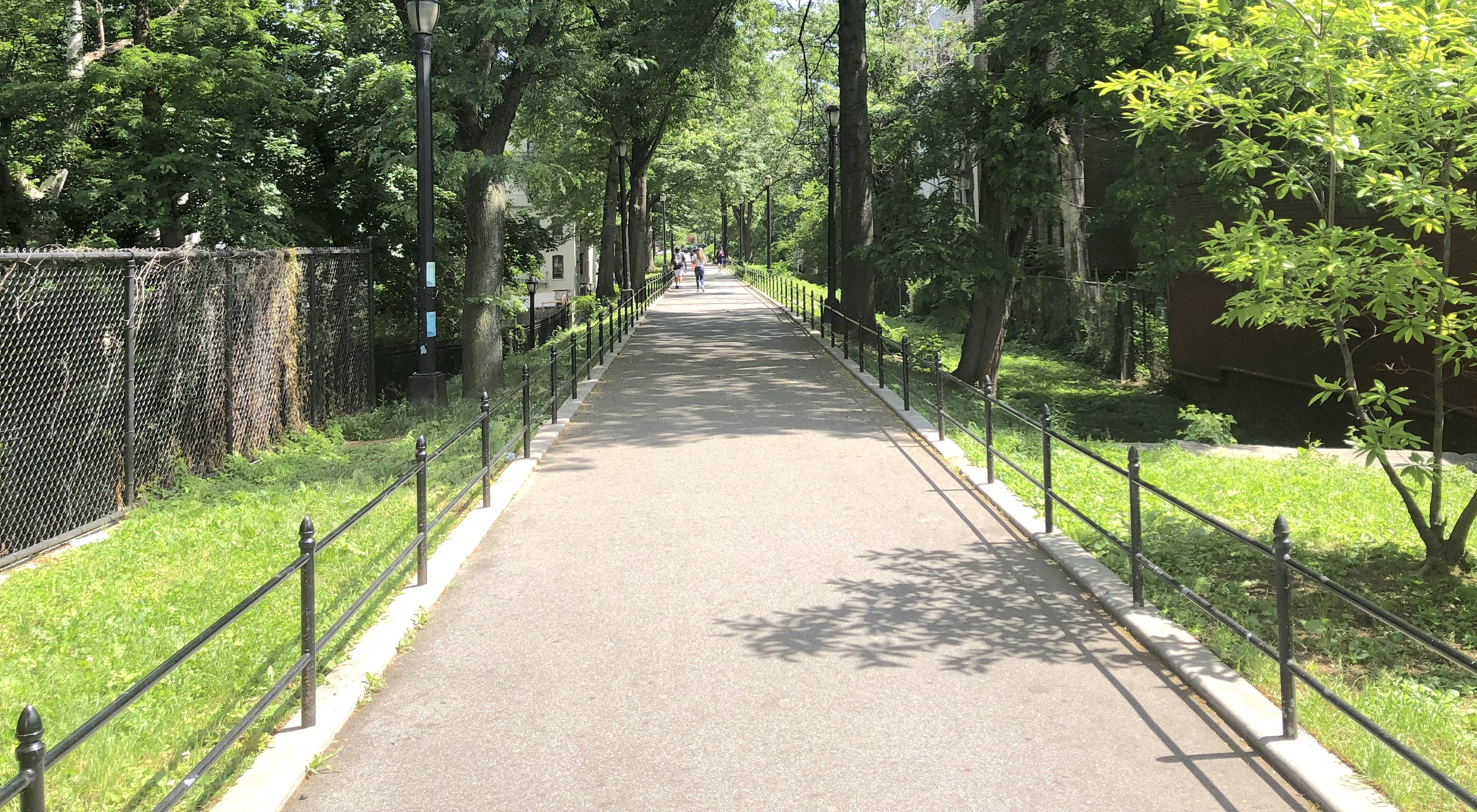
A section of the trail near Fordham Road

In the 21st century, The Bronx Times wrote that Aqueduct Walk was frequently busy with people playing games, relaxing, or just passing by. The park as a whole was frequented by cyclists and pedestrians who often used it as a shortcut, and The New York Times wrote in 2005 that the park was one of several in New York City that saw high use despite their "unkempt pockets". The website City Limits wrote that residents at the northern and southern ends "say they live in very different neighborhoods", since residents near the southern end tended to think of their area as cleaner.

Design work on a restroom at Aqueduct Walk began c. 2006 and took eight and a half years. The Aqueduct Lands Playground was renovated in 2008 as part of a $14 million (Note: Equivalent to $20 million in 2024) renovation program for four playgrounds in the Bronx. The playground's renovation was funded using part of a $200 million (Note: Equivalent to $285.2 million in 2024) mitigation fund from the Croton Water Filtration Plant, which was completed under Van Cortlandt Park several years later. In 2015, NYC Parks began soliciting bids for the new restroom and began designing a renovation of MLK Plaza. The plaza renovation was funded with $2 million from the mayor's office, $600,000 in City Council funds, and $333,000 from the borough president's office. The plaza was rededicated in November 2019 in honor of Roscoe C. Brown Jr., a Tuskegee Airman, United States Army Air Forces veteran, and former president of Bronx Community College (BCC). Also in the late 2010s, a brick restroom building was completed in the park for $1 million.

The park had long had a reputation for illegal drug use, and, in 2018, NYC Parks installed syringe-disposal boxes in the park as part of a pilot program. Drug use in the park was exacerbated during the COVID-19 pandemic in New York City. Morton Playground was renovated in 2022 with $4.9 million from the mayor's office. The New York City Landmarks Preservation Commission began considering designating Aqueduct Walk as a city scenic landmark in August 2023; the commission's chairwoman said that the designation had been contemplated out of consideration for "geographic and cultural communities that have been less well-represented by landmarks". Aqueduct Walk was designated as the Bronx's first official New York City scenic landmark on April 16, 2024, coinciding with the 50th anniversary of Central Park becoming the city's first-ever scenic landmark. Three signs commemorating the designation were installed at Aqueduct Walk that September.

== Civic groups and exhibits ==
The Friends of Aqueduct Walk (FOAW) organization advocates for preserving the remaining portions of the old Croton Aqueduct. During the COVID-19 pandemic, the Friends of Aqueduct Walk collaborated with Photoville and Photo Wings on a public art exhibit that displayed photos and history of the surrounding communities. In addition, they have hosted programming in relation to the exhibit as well as several park clean-ups. BCC students have conducted interviews about the park as part of an oral history program. Additionally, a replica of the aqueduct's Bronx segment is displayed at the Bronx Children's Museum.

== See also ==
- List of New York City Designated Landmarks in the Bronx
