= Elliot Cabot =

American actor (1899–1938)

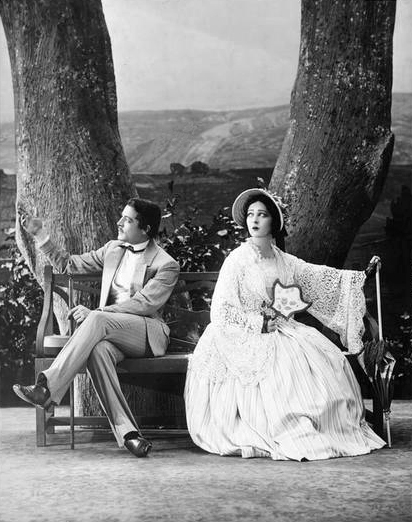
- Elliot Cabot and Nazimova in a 1930 Theatre Guild production of A Month in the Country
- Born: James Elliot Cabot; June 22, 1899; Boston, Massachusetts, U.S.
- Died: June 17, 1938 (aged 38); New York City, U.S.
- Occupation: Actor
- Years active: 1922–1938
- Spouse: Agnes Collins Flannery

James Elliot Cabot (1899–1938) was an American stage actor. Born in Boston to Charles Mills Cabot and Caroline Elizabeth (née Perkins) he attended Harvard University and Caius College, Cambridge University. He studied for the theatre under Frances Robinson-Duff, Laura Elliott and Moffat Johnston. Possessing good looks, he started on Broadway in Six Characters in Search of an Author in 1922. He appeared in the following years in the 1920s in plays that were either based on novels or original for the stage. Later plays include Sun-Up (1923), Mrs. Partridge Presents (1925), The Great Gatsby (1926), The Silver Cord (1926), Coquette (1927).

Cabot appeared in one movie, a 1923 silent Puritan Passions.

Cabot died in New York due to injuries sustained after falling off the Aqueduct Walk trail in the Bronx.
