= Night People (1954 film) =

1954 film by Nunnally Johnson

- 1954 British movie poster
- Directed by: Nunnally Johnson
- Written by: Nunnally Johnson; W. R. Burnett
- Story by: Jed Harris; Tom Reed
- Produced by: Nunnally Johnson
- Starring: Gregory Peck; Broderick Crawford; Anita Björk; Rita Gam; Walter Abel; Buddy Ebsen
- Cinematography: Charles G. Clarke
- Edited by: Dorothy Spencer
- Music by: Cyril J. Mockridge
- Production company: 20th Century Fox
- Distributed by: 20th Century Fox
- Release date: March 12, 1954
- Running time: 93 minutes
- Country: United States
- Language: English
- Budget: $1,250,000
- Box office: $2,150,000 (US rentals)

Night People is a 1954 American thriller film directed, produced and co-written by Nunnally Johnson and starring Gregory Peck, Broderick Crawford, Anita Björk and Buddy Ebsen. The story was co-written by Jed Harris, the theatrical producer.

The story is set in Berlin during the Allied occupation in the years following World War II. Peck plays a Military Police lieutenant colonel of the United States Army.

== Plot ==
Cpl. John Leatherby, an American soldier stationed in West Berlin, is kidnapped after escorting his German girlfriend to her home. The Soviets deny involvement in the kidnapping through their intermediary Col. Lodejinski, who is secretly an American and British intelligence asset. Charles Leatherby, the corporal's father and a Toledo industrialist, attempts to expedite his son's retrieval by leveraging his ties to the Eisenhower administration and prominent senators. The elder Leatherby flies to West Berlin and attempts to bully State Department and military officials into quickly retrieving his son, demanding that they offer the Soviets a monetary bribe. Meanwhile, Lt. Col. Steve Van Dyke, the eccentric provost marshal for the American sector, is contacted by his old flame and East German source "Hoffy" Hoffmeir. Hoffmeir implies that Cpl. Leatherby has been kidnapped by the Soviets or East Germans, who intend to exchange him for two West Berliners, Herr and Frau Schindler. Lacking viable alternatives, Van Dyke allows Hoffmeir to facilitate the trade.

After a tense meeting with Leatherby, Van Dyke invites him to dinner at the Katacombe restaurant, ostensibly to discuss the proposed exchange. Instead, Van Dyke attempts to make Leatherby understand the human cost of the trade by revealing the restaurant's piano player and her husband, who was blinded by the Nazis, as the Schindlers. While visibly disturbed by the prospect of sending the elderly couple to their deaths, Leatherby insists that the exchange proceed. Van Dyke has the couple arrested, but they attempt suicide by strychnine poisoning and are transported to an American military hospital. There, the piano player reveals herself as Rachel Cameron, an English expatriate and MI6 asset, and her husband as General Gerd von Kratzenow, an anti-Nazi conspirator who had been jailed and tortured by the Nazi regime. Cameron reveals that she and her husband, now living under the name Schindler, are being pursued not by the Soviets themselves but by ex-Nazi agents responsible for von Kratzenow's torture, who now serve the Eastern Bloc. Separately, Van Dyke prepares to exfiltrate Col. Lodejinski and his family to the United States, but Lodejinski's American ties are leaked and he commits suicide after killing his entire family.

Van Dyke learns from a colleague in military intelligence that his source, Hoffmeir, is an impostor Eastern Bloc asset herself. Van Dyke suspects that Hoffmeir is responsible for exposing Lodejinski as an American asset, but allows her to proceed with arrangements for the agreed-upon exchange. By claiming to Hoffmeir that von Kratzenow succumbed to the strychnine, Van Dyke sets the stage for a one-to-one trade of Cpl. Leatherby for Cameron. Van Dyke arranges for an ambulance to cross into West Berlin to effect the exchange. He is warned by State Department official Hobart that the United States government will disavow his actions if they prove unsuccessful. To facilitate the exchange without endangering American or British assets, as Cpl. Leatherby is removed from the ambulance, Van Dyke knocks Hoffmeir unconscious and presents her as Cameron. American military police force the ambulance to return to East Berlin before its escort can confirm the patient's identity. Having secured Cpl. Leatherby's return, Van Dyke is warmly congratulated by the senior Leatherby, who appears humbled by the experience. Cpl. Leatherby's repatriation is represented by the American media as a signal of warming relations with the Soviet Union.

== Cast ==
- Gregory Peck as Lt. Col. Steve Van Dyke
- Broderick Crawford as Charles Leatherby
- Anita Björk as "Hoffy" Hoffmeir
- Rita Gam as Ricky Cates
- Walter Abel as Maj. R.A. Foster
- Buddy Ebsen as M/Sgt. Eddie McColloch
- Max Showalter as Frederick S. Hobart (credited as Casey Adams)
- Jill Esmond as Frau Schindler / Rachel Cameron
- Peter van Eyck as Capt. Sergei "Petey" Petrochine
- Marianne Koch as Kathy Gerhardt
- Ted Avery as Cpl. John Leatherby
- Hugh McDermott as Maj. Burns
- John Horsley as Lt. Col. Stanways

== Production ==
1954 CinemaScope Film title card

Gregory Peck, Buddy Ebsen, Broderick Crawford, and Peter van Eyck in a Hospital scene (R2 DVD CinemaScope version)

Peck, Ted Avery, Crawford, Marianne Koch shown in front of the Kaiser Wilhelm Memorial Church in the American Sector of Occupied Berlin (R2 DVD CinemaScope version)

=== Development ===
The screenplay was based on an original story by Jed Harris and Tom Lees. it was developed under the title The Cannibals, a phrase used in the dialogue to describe the kidnappers of Corporal Leatherby. In August 1952 Thomas Chrysler was going to film it with Franchot Tone.

In April 1953 Fox announced that the film would be made in CinemaScope.

In July 1953, The New York Times reported that the title was changed to Night People to avoid audiences anticipating "an African adventure."

The title was taken from a property already owned by Fox, a science fiction vehicle that was to star Richard Widmark but which was never produced.

=== Pre-production ===
Nunnally Johnson had been seeking a project to break into directing, and approached Darryl F. Zanuck to direct Night People. Zanuck was amenable, but informed him that Peck had contractual rights to veto the studio's choice of director and might not want someone without experience. However, Peck and Nunnally Johnson were friends and had worked together on The Gunfighter in 1950, which Johnson had produced and re-scripted. Peck's confidence in him was so high that he readily approved him for his directorial debut.

Johnson later said he "really didn't have much apprehension about" directing. "I'd been watching it so long and I had such good people. I knew what they should do, and I had a good cameraman, a good cutter."

In June 1953 the title was changed to Night People. Gloria Grahame was announced for the role of Frau Hoffmeier. Walter Abel, Anita Björk and Broderick Crawford were then cast. Peck would go on to state that the role of Steve Van Dyke had been one of his favorites because his lines were "tough and crisp and full of wisecracks, and more aggressive than other roles" he'd portrayed.

=== Filming ===
Rumors were published in The Hollywood Reporter in September 1953 that Johnson and Peck had seriously feuded and that Johnson would be replaced with Henry Koster. A possible source was Peck's initial doubts about Johnson's overall abilities, but these were soon dissipated and the pair worked amicably. Darryl F. Zanuck flew out to Munich to inspect Johnson's work, but only stayed two days. He said reports of any conflict between Johnson and Peck were "greatly exaggerated". At the time this movie was made, Berlin was a divided city but not forcibly split by the Berlin Wall of 1961.

Together they had also had to overcome several squabbles on the set with Fox staffers over costuming and other intrusions. One biographer reported that Peck became so angry over one dispute that he channeled his anger into a scene in which his character rebukes Broderick Crawford's, and filmed ten pages of script in two hours. Johnson and Peck teamed together again in The Man in the Gray Flannel Suit.

"Peck's a genuinely nice man", said Johnson. "He's stubborn. He's very opinionated, and sometimes I thought he was rather slow-witted. He isn't really, but he has to be convinced of the necessity of this or that before he'll do it. It can become pretty exasperating because it takes up time, but he helped me in so many ways, by making suggestions as to, say, alteration in the movement of the people. He never imposed any of his ideas."

The movie's exteriors were filmed on location in Berlin, while interiors were filmed at the Geiselgasteig Studios in Munich over a five-week period in the summer of 1953, at a cost of $800,000, shot in the new wide-screen format of Cinemascope. Filming was sometimes made difficult by the tensions existing in Berlin between the United States and the Soviet Union. In one scene filmed near the Brandenburg Gate with realistic props, the film crew came under close scrutiny by numerous armed Russians suspicious of the activity. Filming was complete by October.

== Awards and reception ==
Jed Harris and Tom Reed were nominated for an Academy Award for Best Story.

The film opened in New York on March 12, 1954, to favorable reviews, but was not well received by the public. It placed fifty-second in gross box office receipts for 1954. When released, Variety described it as "a top-notch, exciting cloak-and-dagger thriller" with the director getting "a clean triple for his smart handling of production, direction and scripting."

Johnson said that Billy Wilder told him he admired the movie and later reworked the basic situation in One, Two, Three.

== Home media ==
The film was originally filmed in the 2.55:1 CinemaScope widescreen aspect ratio. It was unavailable on home video for years. In October 2012, it was released on Region 1 DVD as part of the Twentieth Century Fox Cinema Archives collection, however it is cropped at 1.33:1, which means the viewer sees half the picture, and the quality of the screen image is very grainy due to the magnification of the film in order to get the "fullscreen" effect. There are no extras on the DVD, which is manufactured on demand using DVD-R recordable media and may not play in all DVD devices, including recorders and PC drives.

Fox also released the film on Region 2 DVD in Spain. That version is in the original CinemaScope aspect ratio with extras. The DVD is in English with Spanish sub-titles.

It was never available on VHS. A Blu-ray disc was released on July 25, 2017.

In 2019, Rupert Murdoch sold most of 21st Century Fox's film and television assets to Disney, and Night People was one of the films included in the deal.

== Notes ==
- Johnson, Nunnally (1969). Recollections of Nunnally Johnson oral history transcript. University of California Oral History Program.
