= Jed Harris =

American theatre director and producer

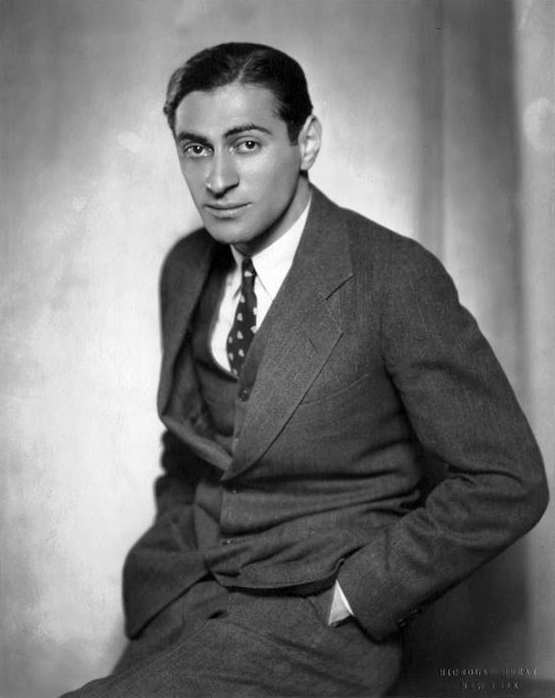
- Jed Harris (1928)
- Born: Jacob Hirsch Horowitz; February 25, 1900; Vienna, Austria-Hungary
- Died: November 15, 1979 (aged 79); New York City, US
- Occupations: Theatrical producer, director
- Years active: 1925–1956
- Partner(s): Ruth Gordon; Margaret Sullavan; Patricia Lynn Burroughs
- Children: 2

Jed Harris (born Jacob Hirsch Horowitz; February 25, 1900 – November 15, 1979) was an Austrian-born American theatrical producer and director. His many successful Broadway productions in the 1920s and 1930s include Broadway (1926), Coquette (1927), The Royal Family (1927), The Front Page (1928), Uncle Vanya (1930), The Green Bay Tree (1933) and Our Town (1938). He later directed the original Broadway productions of The Heiress (1947) and The Crucible (1953).

== Early life ==
Jed Harris was born Jacob Hirsch Horowitz in Vienna, Austria-Hungary, on February 25, 1900, to Meyer and Esther Scherz Horowitz. His family moved to the United States in 1901. He attended school in Monmouth County, New Jersey and entered Yale College at age 17. Although he was studious, he dropped out in 1920, telling a professor "I'm neither rich enough nor dull-witted enough to endure this awful place."

=== Career ===
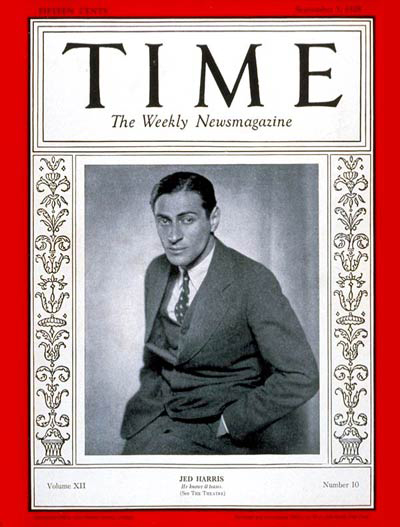
Producer Jed Harris on the cover of Time (September 3, 1928) during the run of his Broadway hit, The Front Page

Harris produced and directed 31 shows between 1925 and 1956. By age 28, he had produced a record four consecutive Broadway hits over the course of 18 months and was on the cover of Time magazine. Over the course of his career, his productions gained seven awards, including a Tony Award and Pulitzer Prize for playwright Thornton Wilder. Harris directed four actors in award-winning roles in Child of Fortune, The Crucible, The Traitor, The Heiress and Our Town.

Described by The New York Times as "a flamboyant man of intermittent charm", Harris was famous for his self-confidence, appeal to women, and sometimes outrageous and abusive behavior. Playwright and director George S. Kaufman, who worked with Harris on The Royal Family (1927) and The Front Page (1928), reportedly hated him and once said "When I die, I want to be cremated and have my ashes thrown in Jed Harris's face." Although Katharine Hepburn received scathing reviews in the New York production of The Lake (1933)—an experience she later described as "a slow walk to the gallows"—Harris insisted that she and the show go to Chicago. "My dear, the only interest I have in you is the money I can make out of you," Hepburn recalled Harris saying. She extricated herself from the contract by offering Harris all the money she had, $13,675.75; "I'll take it," he said. Laurence Olivier, whom Harris had directed on Broadway in The Green Bay Tree (1933), called him "the most loathsome man I'd ever met." In revenge, Olivier used Harris as the basis for his makeup for his 1944 stage (and later screen) portrayal of Richard III.

However despised he may have been in the theatrical community, Harris directed and produced actors including Leo G. Carroll, Laurence Olivier, Lillian Gish, Basil Rathbone, Elaine Stritch, Ruth Gordon, Walter Huston, Osgood Perkins and Katharine Hepburn. Moss Hart wrote that "every aspiring playwright's prayer was: 'Please God, let Jed Harris do my play!'"

In an interview shortly before his death, Harris spoke of the ephemeral nature of the theatre. "The beauty of it is that you can create a whole world in a few weeks of rehearsal. But then the whole thing disappears like a breath of air. Nothing remains after your audience has gone. All it represents is a few moments of escape."

While many of his hit plays were translated into film versions, Harris was hesitant to make the jump to working on films. His first foray into motion pictures was when Broadway, one of his theatre productions, was adapted for a 1929 film. However, starting with The Light Touch (1952), starring George Sanders, Harris wrote the story for a trio of films continuing with Night People (1954), starring Gregory Peck and Buddy Ebsen, and Operation Mad Ball (1957), starring Jack Lemmon, Dick York, and Mickey Rooney.

=== Personal life ===
Harris was married three times: to Anita Green in 1925; to actress Louise Platt, with whom he had a daughter, in 1938; and to actress Bebe Allen briefly in 1957. All of the marriages ended in divorce. Platt accused him of abusing her during their marriage.

Barbara Barondess recalled her immediate attraction to Harris in her memoirs. Although she was a virgin, she willingly submitted to him, and the two began a brief affair, casual on his part but passionate on hers. She realized she was not an important part of his life when she called him at the office and overheard his talking with Ruth Gordon on the phone. Unfortunately and unknown to her at the time, she was pregnant with his child. Barondess elected to undergo an illegal abortion without telling him about the baby.

In 1929, Ruth Gordon was starring in Harris's production of Serena Blandish when she and Harris began a long romance. She became pregnant and their son, Jones Harris, was born in Paris later that year. Although they never married, Gordon and Harris provided their son with a normal upbringing, and his parentage became public knowledge as social conventions changed. In 1932, the family was living discreetly in a small, elegant New York City brownstone. Jones Harris later married the actress and Vanderbilt family heiress Heidi Vanderbilt.

Harris's other romances included Margaret Sullavan. He lived with Patricia Lynn Burroughs for the last three years of his life. She wrote her Ph.D thesis, The Theatrical Career of Jed Harris in New York, 1925–1956, at LSU, completed in 1978. Burroughs assisted Harris in the last years of his life to finish his last book and complete a series of interviews with Dick Cavett.

Harris recalled his life and career in five consecutive 30-minute episodes taped for The Dick Cavett Show, broadcast posthumously, and in an autobiography, Dance on the High Wire, published a week before his death. He died November 15, 1979, aged 79, at University Hospital in New York City after a long illness.

== Theatre credits ==
Date	Title	Role	Notes
October 13–November 1925	Weak Sisters	Producer	Booth Theatre, New York City; Directed by Lynn Starling
February 3–June 1926	Love 'em and Leave 'em	Producer	Sam H. Harris Theatre, New York City; Directed by George Abbott
September 16, 1926 – February 11, 1928	Broadway	Producer	Broadhurst Theatre, New York City; Directed by Philip Dunning and George Abbott; Some ten duplicate productions in the U.S. and abroad supervised by Joseph Calleia
April 4–June 1927	Spread Eagle	Producer	Martin Beck Theatre, New York City; Directed by George Abbott
November 8, 1927–September 1928	Coquette	Producer	Maxine Elliott Theatre, New York City; Directed by George Abbott
December 28, 1927–October 1928	The Royal Family	Producer	Selwyn Theatre, New York City; Directed by David Burton
August 14, 1928 – April 13, 1929	The Front Page	Producer	Times Square Theatre, New York City; Directed by George S. Kaufman
January 23–April 1929	Serena Blandish	Producer	Morosco Theatre, New York City
April 15–July 1930	Uncle Vanya	Producer, director	Cort Theatre, New York City
September 22–October 1930	Uncle Vanya	Producer, director	Booth Theatre, New York City
September 30–October 1930	Mr. Gilhooley	Producer, director	Broadhurst Theatre, New York City
December 23–December 1930	The Inspector General	Producer, director	Hudson Theatre, New York City
April 6–May 1931	The Wiser They Are	Producer, director	Plymouth Theatre, New York City
October 22–November 1931	Wonder Boy	Producer, director	Alvin Theatre, New York City
February 9–27, 1932	The Fatal Alibi	Producer	Booth Theatre, New York City; Directed by Charles Laughton
October 20, 1933–March 1934	The Green Bay Tree	Producer, director	Cort Theatre, New York City
December 26, 1933–February 1934	The Lake	Producer, director	Martin Beck Theatre, New York City
September 20–September 1935	Life's Too Short	Producer, director	Broadhurst Theatre, New York City
August 25–September 1936	Spring Dance	Producer, director	Empire Theatre, New York City
December 27, 1937–May 1938	A Doll's House	Producer, director	Morosco Theatre, New York City
February 4–November 19, 1938	Our Town	Producer, director	Henry Miller's Theatre through February 12; Morosco Theatre from February 14
January 14–31, 1943	Dark Eyes	Producer, director	Belasco Theatre, New York City
December 6–12, 1943	The World's Full of Girls	Producer	Royale Theatre, New York City
February 8–March 10, 1945	One-Man Show	Producer, director	Ethel Barrymore Theatre, New York City
February 5–May 18, 1946	Apple of His Eye	Producer, director	Biltmore Theatre, New York City
October 16–November 16, 1946	Loco	Producer, director	Biltmore Theatre, New York City
September 29, 1947 – September 18, 1948	The Heiress	Director	Biltmore Theatre, New York City
December 4, 1948 – March 12, 1949	Red Gloves	Director	Mansfield Theatre, New York City
March 31–May 28, 1949	The Traitor	Producer, director	48th Street Theatre, New York City
January 22–July 11, 1953	The Crucible	Director	Martin Beck Theatre, New York City; Tony Award for Best Play
November 13–December 1, 1956	Child of Fortune	Producer, director	Royale Theatre, New York City

== Film and television credits ==
Year	Title	Role	Notes
1950–51	The Billy Rose Show	Producer	TV series
1951	The Light Touch	Writer	Story, with Tom Reed
1954	Night People	Writer	Story, with Tom Reed; Nominee, Academy Award for Best Writing, Motion Picture Story
1956	Patterns	Co-producer	Uncredited
1957	Operation Mad Ball	Producer, writer	Writers Guild of America Award nominee

== Accolades ==
Jed Harris and screenwriter Tom Reed were nominated for an Academy Award for Best Writing, Motion Picture Story, for the 1954 film, Night People.

Harris, Arthur Carter and Blake Edwards were nominated for a 1958 Writers Guild of America Award for the screenplay for Operation Mad Ball (1957).

Harris was posthumously inducted into the American Theatre Hall of Fame in 1981.

== Cultural references ==
The central character in Ben Hecht's 1931 novel A Jew in Love is modeled in part on Harris. John Houseman wrote "Ben Hecht in A Jew in Love has described the mixture of deadly cruelty and ineffable charm of which Harris was capable; when he really wanted something or somebody — and even when he did not — no effort was too great, no means too elaborate or circuitous if it helped to satisfy his craving for personal power."

Laurence Olivier believed that the physical features of the Big Bad Wolf in Disney's 1933 animated film The Three Little Pigs were based on Harris, whom Olivier called "the most loathsome man I'd ever met". Harold Clurman agreed with Olivier: "That's Harris's face. I mean made into an animal...There was venom in the man." Years later Olivier discovered that Walt Disney indeed had used Harris as his basis for the Big Bad Wolf. Alexander Korda, who had given Olivier his initial roles on film, provided financial support for The Three Little Pigs.

One of the major characters in Ed Ifkovic's Downtown Strut: an Edna Ferber Mystery is Jed Harris, based on him as the director of the Broadway play The Royal Family.
