= Ann Preston Bridgers =

American actress

Anne Preston Bridgers (May 1, 1891 – May 3, 1967) was an American playwright, actress, and teacher.

== Early years ==
Born in Raleigh, North Carolina, Bridgers was the daughter of Robert Rufus Bridgers, Jr., and Annie Preston Cain. She grew up in Adrian, Georgia. She attended Mary Baldwin Seminary in Staunton, Virginia, and Smith College in Northampton, Massachusetts. She received a bachelor of arts degree from Smith in 1915.

== Career ==
After graduating from Smith College, Bridgers became a public school teacher and part of the Selective Service Bureau. She later opened her own gift shop and also became the president of the Raleigh Community Players. She sold her gift shop in 1923 and then moved to New York where she attended drama school. For a while after 1923, she gained success as a theater actress as understudy to Lynn Fontanne on Broadway in Dulcy. Her next two successful roles were in the plays Fall Guy and Broadway. The first play she wrote was Norma's Affair, later retitled Coquette, which ran for 366 performances on Broadway during 1927-1928, and was made into a 1929 film Coquette. The Theatre Club awarded the play Coquette as "the most pleasing play of 1927–28". After leaving Broadway, she moved back to Raleigh in 1933 after traveling around Europe. She was a member of the board of the Literary and Historical Association, an editor of the Survey of Federal Records, wrote for the Raleigh Times, and wrote for the News and Observer. She helped form the Raleigh Little Theatre.

== Death ==
Bridgers died on May 3, 1967, and was buried at Oakdale Cemetery, Wilmington.

== Papers ==
The Ann Preston Bridgers Papers, 1915-1946 are housed in the Southern Historical Collection at the University of North Carolina. It contains "correspondence, writings, newspaper and magazine clippings, photographs, and other materials" from Bridgers.
