= Coquette (film) =

1929 film by Sam Taylor

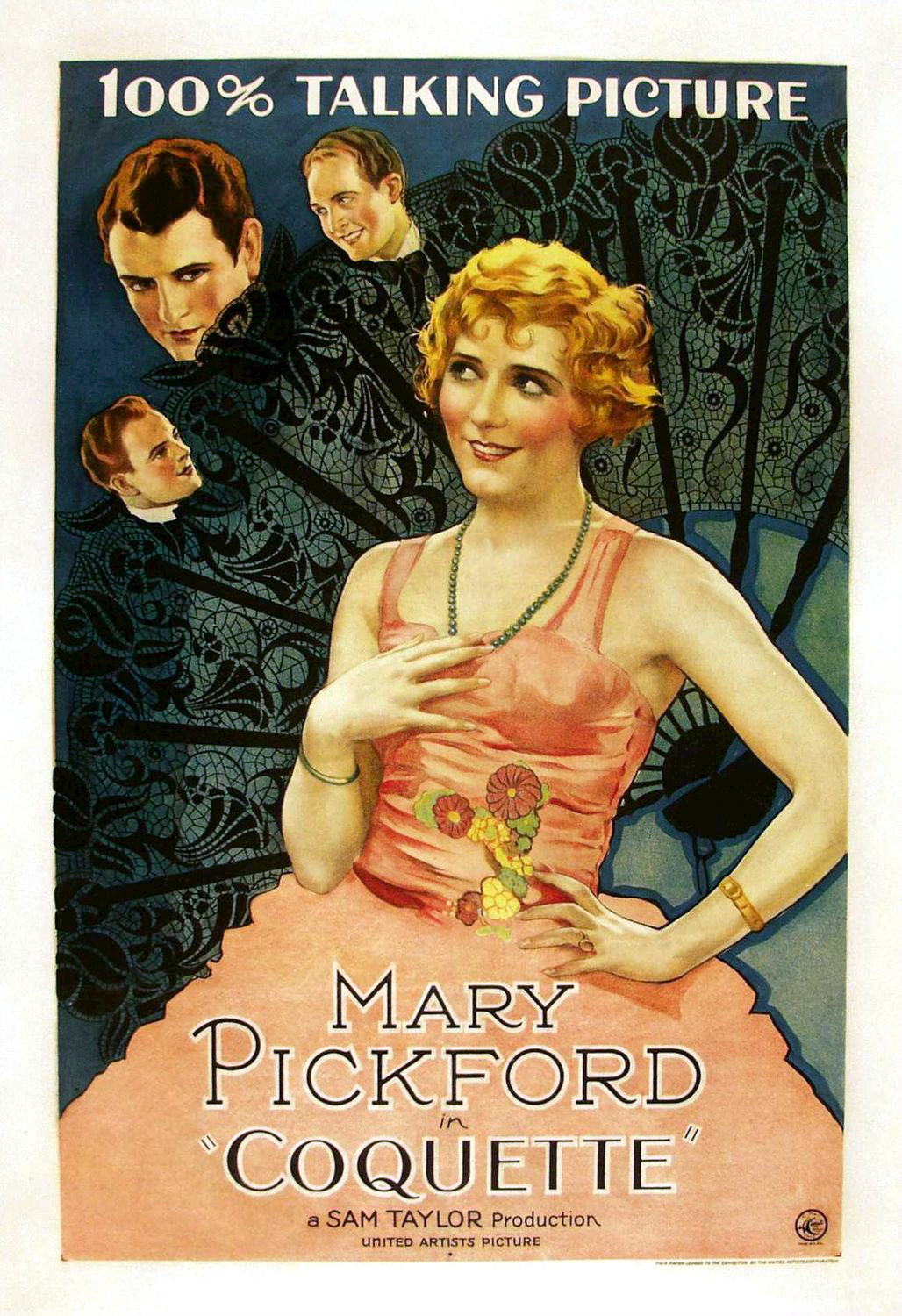
- Promotional poster for the film
- Directed by: Sam Taylor
- Written by: John Grey; Allen McNeil; Sam Taylor
- Based on: Coquette; 1927 play by George Abbott; Ann Preston Bridgers
- Produced by: Sam Taylor; Mary Pickford
- Starring: Mary Pickford; Johnny Mack Brown; Matt Moore
- Cinematography: Karl Struss
- Edited by: Barbara McLean
- Music by: Hugo Riesenfeld
- Distributed by: United Artists
- Release date: April 5, 1929
- Running time: 76 minutes
- Country: United States
- Language: English
- Box office: $1.5 million

Coquette is a 1929 American pre-Code drama film directed by Sam Taylor and starring Mary Pickford, who won the second Academy Award for Best Actress for her performance.

It is notable for being the earliest known Talkie to include the variations of the word "Damn". "Damned" is said 42 minutes in, and "Damnably" 43 minutes in.

== Plot ==
Coquette (1929)

Norma Besant, daughter of a Southern doctor, is an incorrigible flirt and has many suitors. Her father Dr. Besant favors Stanley, who is taken with Norma. However, Norma has met a simple man named Michael Jeffrey with whom she has fallen madly in love. Dr. Besant disapproves and orders Norma to never see Michael again. Norma agrees but then promptly plans to marry Michael in six months if he can earn enough money in the hills to afford to buy them a home in the valley. A few months pass and Michael emerges from the hills to see Norma at a country-club dance. Wanting more time alone, they sneak off to Michael's mother's cabin. She returns home early the next day, but someone has spotted the couple and begun to spread rumors around town that threaten to destroy Norma's reputation. Michael is furious and vows that he will ask Norma's father for her hand in marriage immediately.

Dr. Besant is furious with Michael and a heated verbal exchange ensues. Michael leaves and vows to marry Norma as soon as possible, but Dr. Besant orders Norma to her room and leaves in search of Michael, pistol in hand. As Norma's brother tries to distract her, Stanley arrives, informing her that her father has shot Michael. Norma runs to Michael's cabin, where he dies in her arms. Dr. Besant's lawyer friend arrives and beseeches Norma to lie to the police to save her father's life. Norma refuses, but later as the trial progresses, she changes her mind. On the stand, she lies about Michael, trying to save her father. She withers under cross examination and Dr. Besant comforts her on the witness stand, telling her she does not have to lie any more. However, when Dr. Besant spots the gun on the evidence table, he confesses his guilt, expressing his willingness to pay the price for his crime. He grabs the gun and shoots himself in front of the court.

Stanley is waiting for Norma, who has been in the judge's chambers. He offers to walk her home, but Norma refuses, saying that she would prefer to walk alone.

== Cast ==
- Mary Pickford as Norma Besant
- Johnny Mack Brown as Michael Jeffery
- Matt Moore as Stanley Wentworth
- John St. Polis as Dr. John Besant
- William Janney as Jimmy Besant
- Henry Kolker as Jasper Carter
- George Irving as Robert Wentworth
- Louise Beavers as Julia

== Production ==
Coquette stars silent star Mary Pickford, one of the most popular stars in silent film, in her first talkie. She became one of the first major stars of the silent era to find success in the new era of sound films. At her Pickfair Studios, she installed a sound stage in 1928 and began preparing for her first talkie. Despite Pickford's embrace of the new medium, she was concerned about how her voice would sound, although she had enjoyed a successful stage career before entering film. After reviewing her first sound test, she reportedly remarked, "Why that sounds like a little pipsqueak voice!" She immediately began intensive vocal lessons, hoping to accomplish a realistic Southern accent for the role. Pickford became nervous during preparation, firing her sound man when a take was not ready for her review on time. On set during an emotional scene, she notoriously fired her longtime cameraman and friend Charles Rosher when he yelled "Cut!" in the middle of one of her lines. After she learned that Rosher's exclamation only occurred after a shadow had fallen across her face, spoiling the shot, she wrote him an apologetic letter writing: "Tragedy is an ugly mask. I don't want to look like something on a candy box or a valentine."

Pickford purchased the rights to the story, a play by George Abbott and Ann Preston Bridgers. The script was then adapted for the screen by John Grey, Allen McNeil and Sam Taylor. The play was based on real events in Richmond County, North Carolina, some dialogue was used verbatim from court testimony. The play originally opened in New York on November 8, 1927, with Helen Hayes in the title role.

The nascent sound technology of the time caused footsteps or rattling jewelry to ruin takes. Cameras could barely move and were positioned behind glass barriers to prevent their interference with the sound recording. However, the film has more natural movement and acting than do other early talkies.

Though a product of pre-Code Hollywood, the film was heavily censored during scripting. In the play, the leading lady is pregnant and the story hinges on the fact that she carries the child of the man killed by her father. Her father murders the man because he had asked to marry the girl. But to save her father from disgrace when her pregnancy becomes apparent, she preemptively kills herself. Authors Morris Ernst and Pare Lorentz wrote in Censored: The Private Life of the Movie that "... the censor conscious producer would not allow the movie to show the girl enceinte, thus destroying the whole plot."

William Cameron Menzies provided set decoration although the film credits him for "settings". Karl Struss was the film's cinematographer.

The song "Coquette" heard in the film, written by Irving Berlin, has since become a jazz standard.

== Release ==
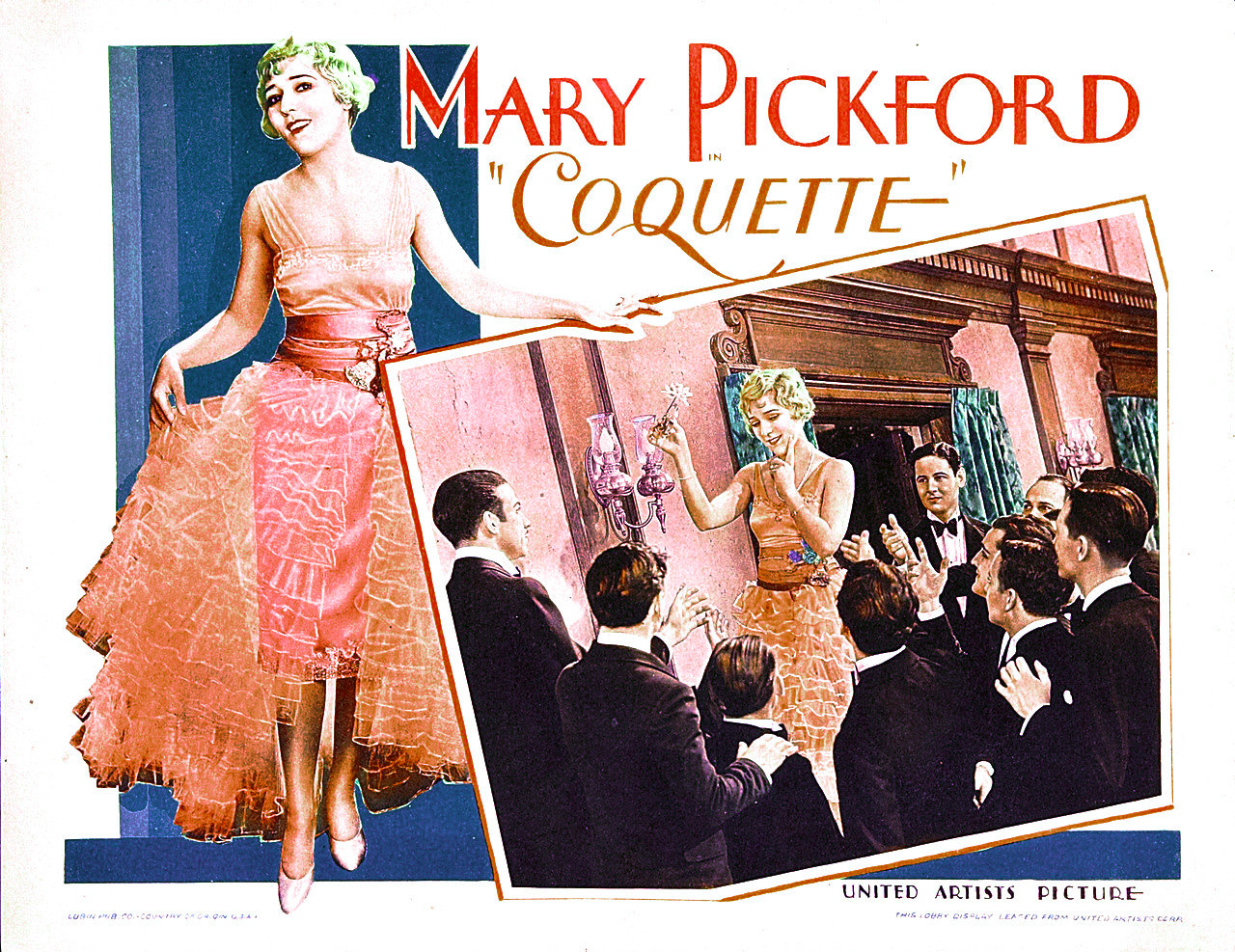
Lobby card

The film premiered in New York on April 5, 1929 at the Rivoli Theatre. However, when a fuse blew during the premiere, the sound was unavailable. The film was rewound and shown again, although with intermittent, poor-quality sound. Technicians were ultimately able to fix the problem and the film began again for a third time.

Contemporary reviews were generally polite and warm. The film was a box-office success, grossing $1.4 million. Coquette launched Pickford as a competent talkie star.

Complete prints of the film are extant. In the 1990s, it was restored by the Library of Congress and the Mary Pickford Institute. Pickford's estate no longer owns the rights, as MGM had purchased them for a remake that never materialized. Coquette was released on home video by MGM/UA Home Video in the 1990s. It has been released on DVD as part of the Warner Archive Collection.

== Awards ==
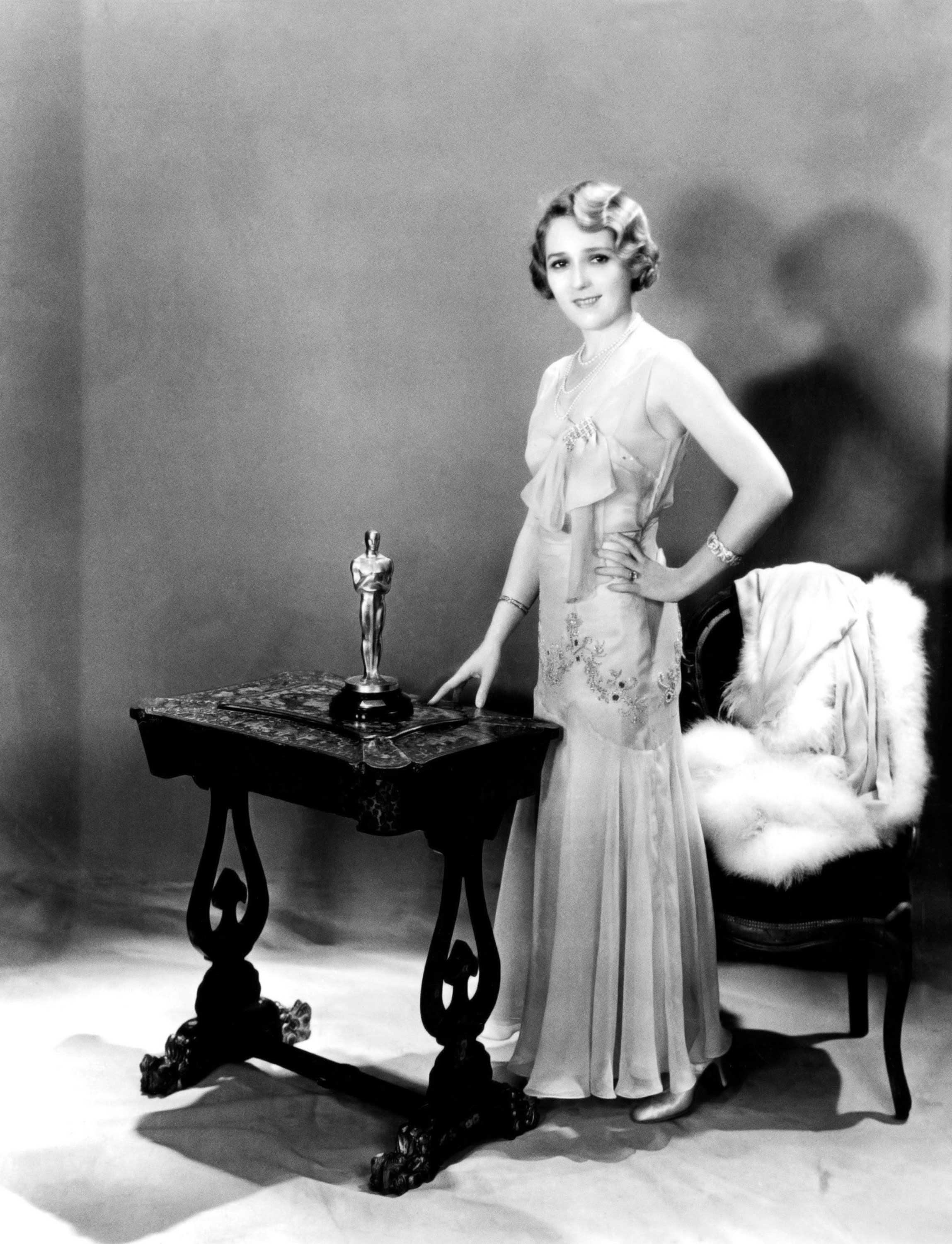
Mary Pickford with her Academy Award for Best Actress for her role in Coquette

The 1st Academy Awards were held in 1929 without any nominations for Pickford. However, she was nominated for Best Actress in 1930 for the 2nd Academy Awards. Pickford lobbied for the award, inviting the judges for tea at her home, Pickfair. Nonetheless, her performance was critically and publicly acclaimed. Pickford won one more Oscar, the 1975 Academy Honorary Award.

In 2008, a legal battle ensued between the Academy of Motion Picture Arts and Sciences and Buddy Rogers' heirs over the sale of the Coquette Oscar award. The heirs were trying to sell the award for charity, as stipulated in Rogers's second wife's will. The Academy insisted that the award must be sold back to them for $1 in order to comply with a rule implemented long after Pickford had won her 1930 Oscar. The Academy claimed that when Pickford won her 1975 honorary Oscar, she signed a contract also covering the Coquette statuette. The heirs argued that the signature on the contract may not have been that of Pickford, who was frail at the end of her life. The Academy won the legal battle but announced that it was willing to pursue a private agreement with the heirs.

== See also ==
- 1929 in film
- List of films with the most Academy Awards per ceremony
- List of early sound feature films (1926–1929)
