= Royal Showcase =

American TV comedy-variety series (1952)

Royal Showcase is an American comedy-variety television series that was broadcast on NBC from January 13, 1952, to June 29, 1952. Sponsored by the United States Rubber Company, it was also known as U. S. Royal Showcase.

== Overview ==
Royal Showcase initially had a three-act structure. A star comedian began each episode, after which a popular recording artist sang. A segment with a promising young comedian concluded the show. George Abbott was the initial host; Jack Carson replaced him effective April 13, 1952, and by that time performances by newcomers had been discontinued. Gordon Jenkins was the music director, and Ben Grauer was the announcer.

The new-talent slot was related to NBC's then-recent creation of a comedy development plan, which was overseen by former talent agent Joe Bigelow. The trade publication Billboard reported that the new performers who appeared on the show apparently had "an option commitment" such that if they succeeded, the network "will be able to capitalize on" that success. Entertainers who went through the process and appeared on the showcase included Kaye Ballard, Jean Carroll, Eddie Foy Jr., Joel Grey, and Guy Raymond.

== Performers ==
Other notable performers who appeared on the show included:

- Lola Albright
- Fred Allen
- Louis Armstrong
- Mimi Benzell
- Milton Berle
- Victor Borge
- Rosemary Clooney
- Perry Como
- Anne Jeffreys
- Pee Wee King
- Bert Lahr
- Frankie Laine
- Harpo Marx
- Guy Mitchell
- Patricia Morison
- Jane Pickens
- John Raitt
- Blanche Thebom
- Martha Wright

== Production ==
Bigelow was the producer, and Abbott directed the show, which was broadcast live from New York City on Sundays from 7 to 7:30 p.m. Eastern Time, replacing Chesterfield Sound-off Time. Unlike most TV programs, Royal Showcase had no regular writers. Abbott wrote his own lines, and some guest performers provided their own material. Other guests used sketches that the program bought "on the open market". The show originated from WNBT-TV.

== Critical response ==
A review of the show's first two episodes in The New York Times said that Royal Showcase "seems uncertain what it wants to be". The review said that status resulted from some parts being like an "intimate type of revue" while other aspects followed "the 'big' vaudeville concept already so familiar to TV viewers". It said that Abbott seemed uneasy on stage and was not well-suited to either being a straight man or acting as master of ceremonies. The review concluded with two suggestions: 1) discard Abbott's script and have him just introduce acts and 2) discard the format and devote the full time to "the many talented young people of the theatre".

The trade publication Variety called Royal Showcase "an entertaining entry", complimenting Abbott on his work as master of ceremonies and on his brief participation in sketches. It also complimented the performances of Grey, Clooney, and Lahr. Production was commended as "topflight throughout", with special mention of camera work as Clooney sang.
