= George Abbott =

American writer and director (1887–1995)

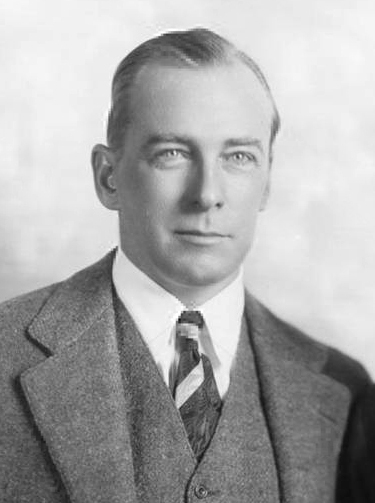
- Abbott in 1928
- Born: George Francis Abbott; June 25, 1887; Forestville, New York, U.S.
- Died: January 31, 1995 (aged 107); Miami Beach, Florida, U.S.
- Education: University of Rochester (BA); Harvard University
- Occupations: Theatre producer; theatre director; playwright; screenwriter; film producer; film director
- Spouses: Edna Lewis (m. 1914; died 1930); Mary Sinclair (m. 1946; div. 1951); Joy Valderrama (m. 1983)
- Writing career
- Period: 1913–1995
- Notable awards: Drama Desk Award Outstanding Director (1983); Pulitzer Prize for Drama (1960); Tony Award Best Direction (1960, 1963); Tony Award Best Musical (1955, 1956, 1960); Special Tony Award (1987); National Medal of Arts (1990)

George Francis Abbott (June 25, 1887 – January 31, 1995) was an American theatre producer, director, playwright, screenwriter, film director, and producer, whose career spanned eight decades. He received numerous honors, including six Tony Awards, the Pulitzer Prize, the Kennedy Center Honors in 1982, the National Medal of Arts in 1990, and was inducted into the American Theatre Hall of Fame.

Starting as an actor, he later became known for producing numerous Broadway productions, such as Pal Joey (1940), On the Town (1944), Call Me Madam (1950), Wonderful Town (1953), The Pajama Game (1954), Damn Yankees (1955, and again in 1994), New Girl in Town (1957), Once Upon a Mattress (1959), Fiorello! (book, 1959), A Funny Thing Happened on the Way to the Forum (1962), and Broadway (1987).

Abbott also acted in numerous films in the 1920s and 1930s. He received an Academy Award for Best Writing nomination for All Quiet on the Western Front (1930). He later directed the movie musical adaptations of The Pajama Game (1957) and Damn Yankees (1958).

== Early years ==
Abbott was born in Forestville, New York, to George Burwell Abbott (May 1858 Erie County, New York – February 4, 1942 Hamburg, New York) and Hannah May McLaury (1869 – June 20, 1940 Hamburg, New York). He later moved to the city of Salamanca, which twice elected his father mayor. In 1898, his family moved to Cheyenne, Wyoming, where he attended Kearney Military Academy. Within a few years, his family returned to New York, and he graduated from Hamburg High School in 1907.

In 1911, he obtained a bachelor of arts degree from the University of Rochester, where he played football and wrote his first play, Perfectly Harmless, for the University Dramatic Club. Abbott then attended Harvard University to take a course in playwriting from George Pierce Baker. Under Baker's tutelage, he wrote The Head of the Family, which was performed at the Harvard Dramatic Club in 1912. He then worked for a year as "author, gofer, and actor" at the Bijou Theatre in Boston, where his play The Man in the Manhole won a contest.

== Career ==
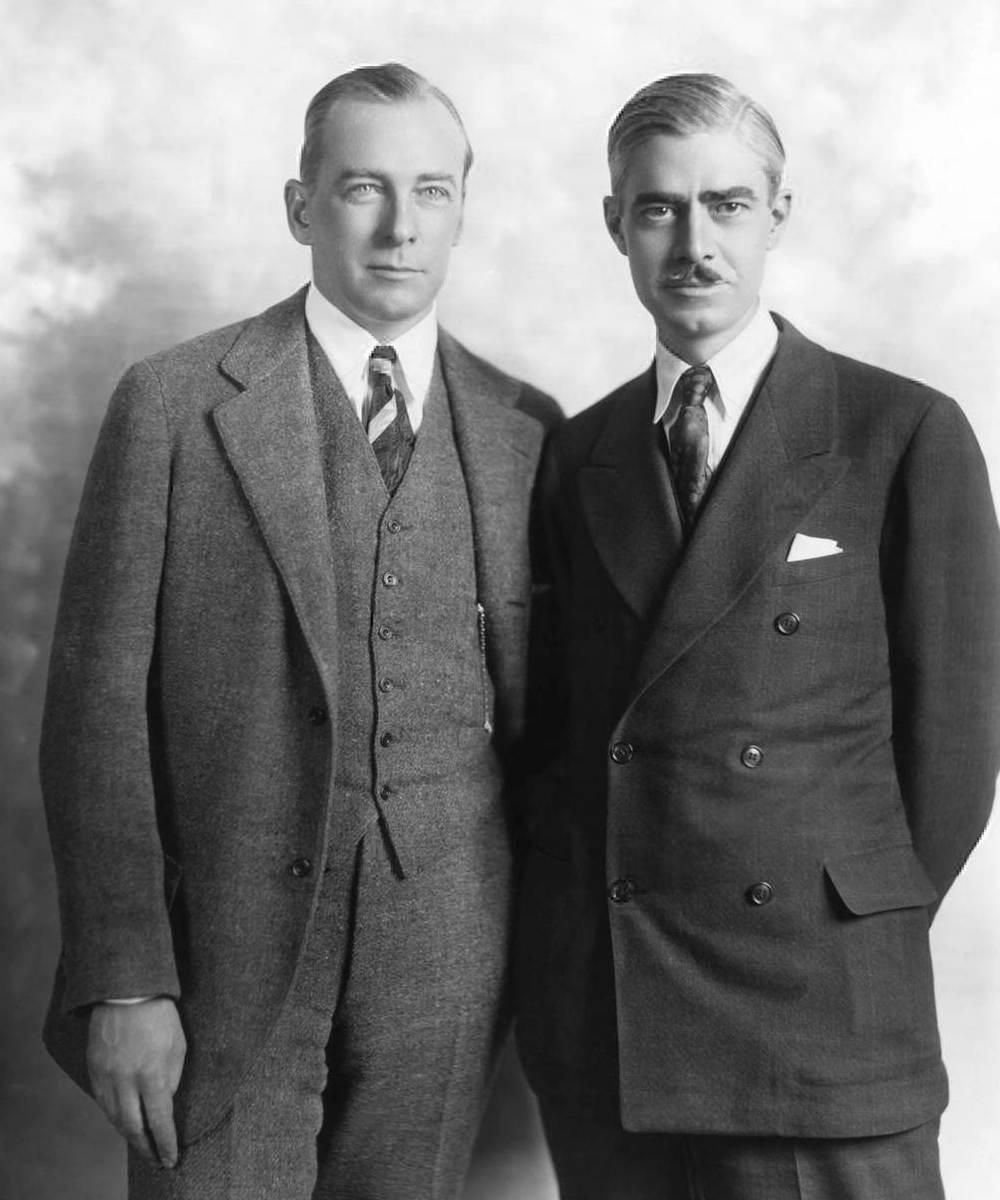
George Abbott and Philip Dunning (1928)

Abbott started acting on Broadway in 1913, debuting in The Misleading Lady. While acting in several plays in New York City, he began to write; his first successful play was The Fall Guy (1925).

Abbott acquired a reputation as an astute "show doctor". He frequently was called upon to supervise changes when a show was having difficulties in tryouts or previews prior to its Broadway opening. His first hit was Broadway, written and directed in partnership with Philip Dunning, whose play Abbott "rejiggered". It opened on September 16, 1926, at the Broadhurst Theatre and ran for 603 performances. Other successes followed, and only a rare year did not have an Abbott production on Broadway.

He also worked in Hollywood as a film writer and director, while continuing with his theatre work.

Among those who worked with Abbott early in their careers are Desi Arnaz, Leonard Bernstein, Carol Burnett, Betty Comden and Adolph Green, June Havoc, John Kander and Fred Ebb, Gene Kelly, Liza Minnelli, Stephen Sondheim, Elaine Stritch, and Jule Styne. He introduced the "fast-paced, tightly integrated style that influenced" performers and especially directors such as Jerome Robbins, Bob Fosse, and Hal Prince.

Abbott directed Royal Showcase, a comedy-variety television program that ran on NBC from January 13 to June 26, 1952, and he was the show's host until April 13, 1952.

== Autobiography ==
In 1963, he published his autobiography, Mister Abbott.

== Personal life ==
Abbott was married to Edna Lewis from 1914 to her death in 1930; they had one child. Actress Mary Sinclair was his second wife. Their marriage lasted from 1946 until their 1951 divorce. He had a long romance with actress Maureen Stapleton from 1968 to 1978. She was 43 and he was 81 when they began their affair, then 10 years later, Abbott left her for a younger woman. His third wife was Joy Valderrama. They were married from 1983 until his death in 1995.

Abbott was a vigorous man who remained active past his 100th birthday by golfing and dancing. He died from complications of a stroke on January 31, 1995, at his home on Sunset Island off Miami Beach, Florida, at age 107. The New York Times obituary read, "Mrs. Abbott said that a week and a half before his death, he was dictating revisions to the second act of Pajama Game with a revival in mind, in addition to working on a revival of Damn Yankees.

At the age of 106, he walked down the aisle on opening night of the Damn Yankees revival and received a standing ovation. He was heard saying to his companion, "There must be somebody important here." Just 13 days before his 107th birthday, Abbott made an appearance at the 48th Tony Awards, coming onstage with fellow Damn Yankees alumni Gwen Verdon and Jean Stapleton at the end of the opening number, a medley performed by the nominees for Best Revival of a Musical, which included Grease, She Loves Me, Carousel, and his own Damn Yankees.

He was cremated at Woodlawn Park Cemetery in Miami and the ashes were taken by his wife.

== Family ==
In addition to his wife, who died in 2020 at 88, Abbott was survived by a sister, Isabel Juergens, who died a year later at the age of 102; two granddaughters, Amy Clark Davidson and Susan Clark Hansley; a grandson, George Clark, and six great-grandchildren.

== Honors ==
In 1965, the 54th Street Theatre was rechristened the George Abbott Theatre in his honor. The building was demolished in 1970. New York City's George Abbott Way, the section of West 45th Street northwest of Times Square, is also named after him.

He received New York City's Handel Medallion in 1976, honorary doctorates from the Universities of Rochester and Miami, and the Kennedy Center Honors in 1982. He was also inducted into the Western New York Entertainment Hall of Fame and the American Theatre Hall of Fame. In 1990, he was awarded the National Medal of Arts.

== Work ==
=== Stage ===
Source: Playbill

- 1913: The Misleading Lady (actor)
- 1915: The Yeomen of the Guard (actor)
- 1918: Daddies (actor)
- 1920: The Broken Wing (actor)
- 1923: Zander the Great (actor)
- 1924: Hell-Bent Fer Heaven (actor)
- 1925: The Fall Guy (playwright)
- 1926: Love 'em and Leave 'em (playwright, director)
- 1926: Chicago (director)
- 1926: Broadway (playwright, director)
- 1927: Coquette (playwright, director)
- 1928: Gentlemen of the Press (director)
- 1932: Lilly Turner (playwright, director, producer)
- 1932: Twentieth Century (director, producer)
- 1934: Small Miracle (director)
- 1935: Three Men on a Horse (playwright, director)
- 1935: Jumbo (director)
- 1936: On Your Toes (book)
- 1937: Room Service (director, producer)
- 1937: Brown Sugar (director, producer)
- 1938: The Boys from Syracuse (book, director, producer)
- 1939: Too Many Girls (director, producer)
- 1939: The Primrose Path (director, producer)
- 1940: Pal Joey (director, producer)
- 1940: The Unconquered (producer, director)
- 1941: Best Foot Forward (producer, director)
- 1942: Beat the Band (producer, director, book)
- 1943: Kiss and Tell (play) (producer, director)
- 1944: A Highland Fling (play) (producer, director)
- 1944: On the Town (director)
- 1945: Billion Dollar Baby (musical) (director)
- 1947: High Button Shoes (director)
- 1948: Where's Charley? (book, director)
- 1949: Mrs. Gibbons' Boys (producer, director)
- 1950: Call Me Madam (director)
- 1951: A Tree Grows in Brooklyn (book, director, producer)
- 1953: Wonderful Town (director) Me and Juliet (director)
- 1954: The Pajama Game (book, director)
- 1955: Damn Yankees (book, director)
- 1957: New Girl in Town (book, director)
- 1959: Once Upon a Mattress (director)
- 1959: Fiorello! (book, director)
- 1960: Tenderloin (book, director)
- 1961: Take Her, She's Mine (director)
- 1962: A Funny Thing Happened on the Way to the Forum (director)
- 1962: Never Too Late (director)
- 1964: Fade Out – Fade In (director)
- 1965: Flora the Red Menace (book, director)
- 1965: Anya (book, director)
- 1967: How Now, Dow Jones (director)
- 1968: The Education of H*Y*M*A*N K*A*P*L*A*N (director)
- 1969: The Fig Leaves Are Falling (director)
- 1970: Norman, Is That You? (director)
- 1976: Music Is (book, director)
- 1987: Broadway (revival, book, director)
- 1994: Damn Yankees (revival, book, consultant, script revisions)

=== Filmography ===
Year	Title	Credit
1918	The Imposter	Writer, actor (Lem)
1926	Love 'Em and Leave 'Em	Writer
1927	Hills of Peril	Playwright, A Holy Terror
1928	Four Walls	Playwright, writer
1929	Coquette	Playwright
1929	The Carnival Man	Director
1929	Broadway	Playwright, writer
1929	The Bishop's Candlesticks	Director
1929	Why Bring That Up?	Director, writer
1929	The Saturday Night Kid	Playwright, Love 'Em and Leave 'Em
1929	Night Parade	Playwright, Ringside
1929	Half Way to Heaven	Director, writer
1930	El Dios del mar	Writer
1930	All Quiet on the Western Front	Writer
1930	The Fall Guy	Playwright
1930	Manslaughter	Director, writer
1930	The Sea God	Director, writer
1931	The Leap into the Void	Writer
1931	Stolen Heaven	Director; writer
1931	The Incorrigible	Playwright, Manslaughter
1931	Sombras del circo	Playwright, Halfway to Heaven
1931	À mi-chemin du ciel	Playwright, Halfway to Heaven
1931	Secrets of a Secretary	Director, writer
1931	My Sin	Director; writer
1931	The Cheat	Director
1932	Halvvägs till himlen	Writer
1932	Those We Love	Playwright
1933	Lilly Turner	Playwright
1934	Heat Lightning	Playwright
1934	Straight Is the Way	Playwright, Four Walls
1936	Three Men on a Horse	Playwright
1938	Broadway	Writer
1939	On Your Toes	Playwright
1940	Too Many Girls	Director
1940	The Boys from Syracuse	Playwright, director
1941	Highway West	Playwright, Heat Lightning
1942	Broadway	Playwright
1947	Beat the Band	Playwright
1957	The Pajama Game	Writer, director, producer
1958	Damn Yankees	Writer, director, producer

== Awards and nominations ==
Source: Playbill

Awards

- 1955 Tony Award for Best Musical – The Pajama Game
- 1956 Tony Award for Best Musical – Damn Yankees
- 1960 Pulitzer Prize for Drama – Fiorello!
- 1960 Tony Award for Best Direction of a Musical – Fiorello!
- 1960 Tony Award for Best Musical – Fiorello!
- 1963 Tony Award for Best Direction of a Musical – A Funny Thing Happened on the Way to the Forum
- 1976 Special Tony Award: The Lawrence Langer award
- 1983 Drama Desk Award for Outstanding Director of a Musical – On Your Toes
- 1987 Special Tony Award on the occasion of his 100th birthday

Nominations

- 1930 Academy Award for Best Achievement in Writing – All Quiet on the Western Front
- 1958 Writers Guild of America Award for Best Written American Musical – Damn Yankees
- 1958 Tony Award for Best Musical – New Girl in Town
- 1958 Writers Guild of America Award for Best Written American Musical – The Pajama Game
- 1959 Directors Guild of America Award for Outstanding Directorial Achievement in Motion Pictures – Damn Yankees
- 1963 Tony Award for Best Direction of a Play – Never Too Late
- 1968 Tony Award for Best Direction of a Musical – How Now, Dow Jones

== See also ==
- List of centenarians (actors, filmmakers and entertainers)
