= Broadway (play) =

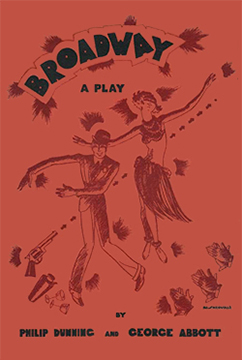
- First edition 1927
- Written by: George Abbott; Philip Dunning
- Original language: English
- Genre: Drama
- Setting: The private party room of the Paradise Night Club, New York City

Premiere
- Date premiered: September 16, 1926
- Place premiered: Broadhurst Theatre, New York City, New York

Broadway is a 1926 Broadway play produced by Jed Harris and written and directed by George Abbott and Philip Dunning. It was Abbott's first big hit on his way to becoming "the most famous play doctor of all time" after he "rejiggered" Dunning's play. The crime drama used "contemporary street slang and a hard-boiled, realistic atmosphere" to depict the New York City underworld during Prohibition. It opened on September 16, 1926, at the Broadhurst Theatre and was one of the venue's greatest hits, running for 603 performances.

== Production ==
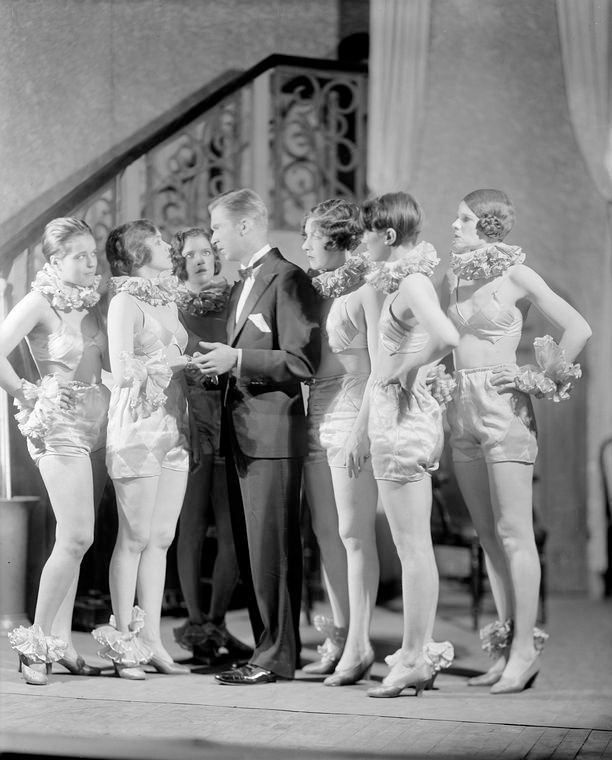
Roy (Lee Tracy) questions Billie (Sylvia Field) about the bracelet she is wearing in the original production of Broadway (1926)

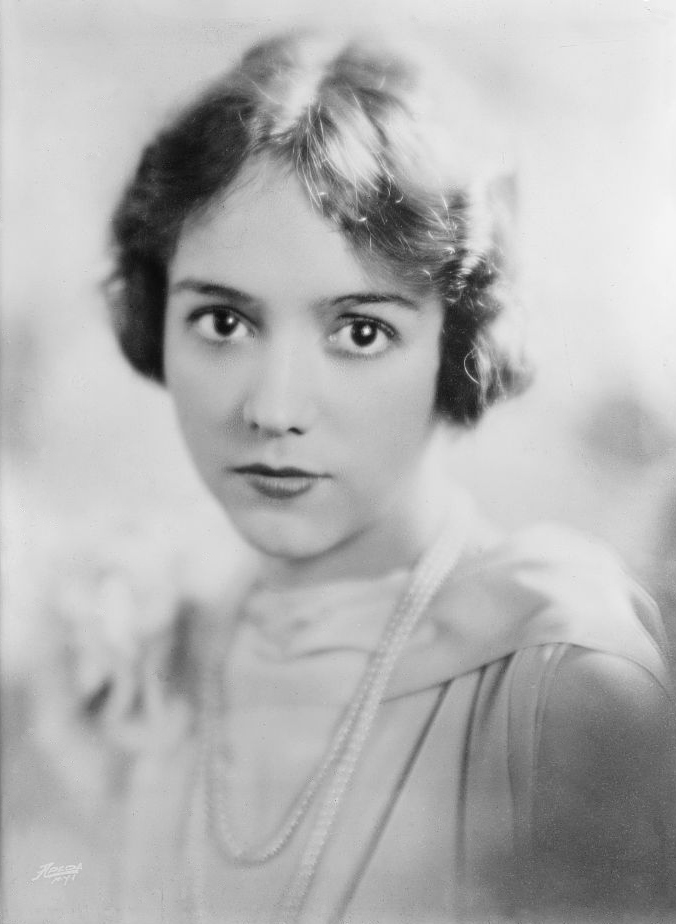
Sylvia Field, costarring with Lee Tracy in Broadway (1927)

Written and directed by Philip Dunning and George Abbott, and produced by Jed Harris, Broadway opened September 16, 1926, at the Broadhurst Theatre in New York City. The cast is listed in order of appearance:

- Paul Porcasi as Nick Verdis
- Lee Tracy as Roy Lane
- Clare Woodbury as Lil Rice
- Ann Preston Bridgers as Katie
- Joseph Calleia as Joe (later Edward La Roche)
- Mildred Wall as Mazie Smith
- Edith Van Cleve as Ruby
- Eloise Stream as Pearl
- Molly Ricardel as Grace
- Constance Brown as Ann
- Sylvia Field as Billie Moore
- Robert Gleckler as Steve Crandall
- Henry Sherwood as Dolph
- William Foran as Porky Thompson
- John Wray as Scar Edwards
- Thomas Jackson as Dan McCorn
- Frank Verigun as Benny
- Millard Mitchell as Larry
- Roy R. Lloyd as Mike

Broadway was a smash hit, running for 603 performances. In addition to having his first prominent stage role, cast member Joseph Calleia acted as the company's stage manager and, working for producer Jed Harris, he supervised some ten duplicate productions of Broadway in the United States and abroad.

== Adaptations ==
=== Film ===
Carl Laemmle paid $225,000 for the film rights in 1927, a sum that set a record. Universal Pictures released Broadway on September 15, 1929.

=== Television ===
A one-hour adaptation of Broadway starring Joseph Cotten and Piper Laurie aired May 4, 1955, on the CBS TV series The Best of Broadway.

== Revivals ==
A 1978 Broadway-bound revival of Broadway, directed by Robert Allan Ackerman and musical staging by Dennis Grimaldi closed during its Boston tryout. A production directed by Abbott at the Great Lakes Theater Festival transferred to Broadway in 1987; it closed after three previews and four performances.
