= Philip Dunning =

American playwright

Philip Hart Dunning
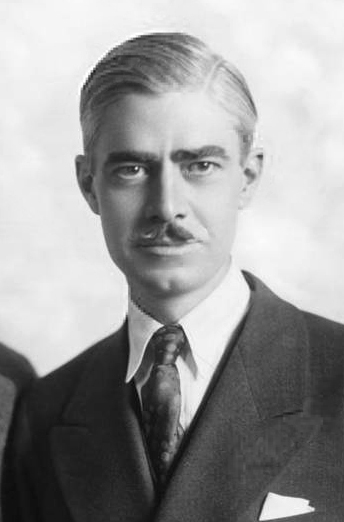
- Dunning in 1928
- Born: December 11, 1889; Meriden, Connecticut, U.S.
- Died: July 20, 1968 (aged 78); Westport, Connecticut, U.S.
- Resting place: Assumption Cemetery New, Westport, Connecticut
- Other name: Philip Dunn
- Occupations: Playwright, theatrical producer
- Known for: Broadway (play)
- Spouse(s): Edna Hibbard; Frances Fox Dunning

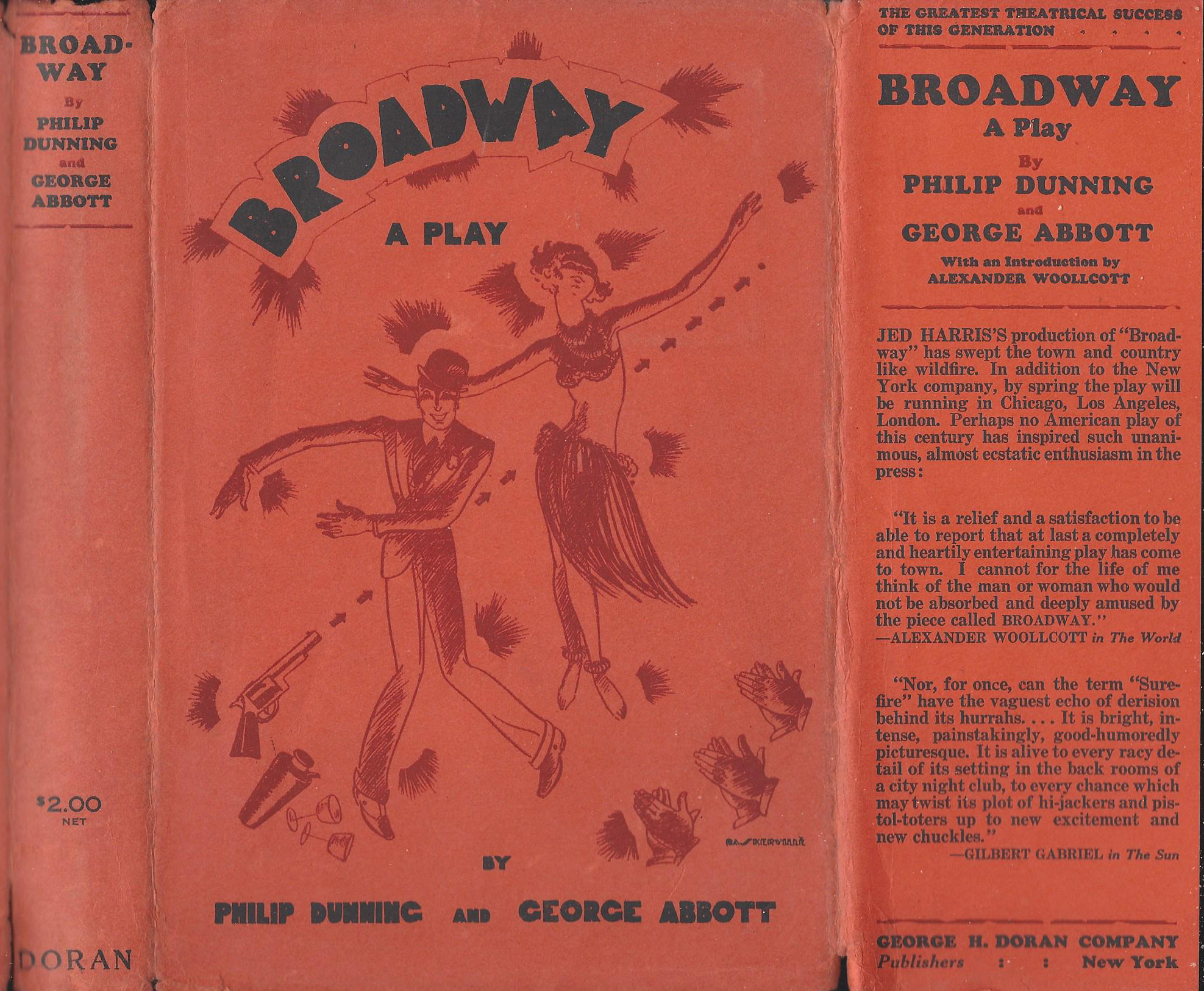
Broadway Dust Jacket

Philip Hart Dunning (December 11, 1889 – July 20, 1968) was a playwright and theatrical producer.

== Theater and films ==
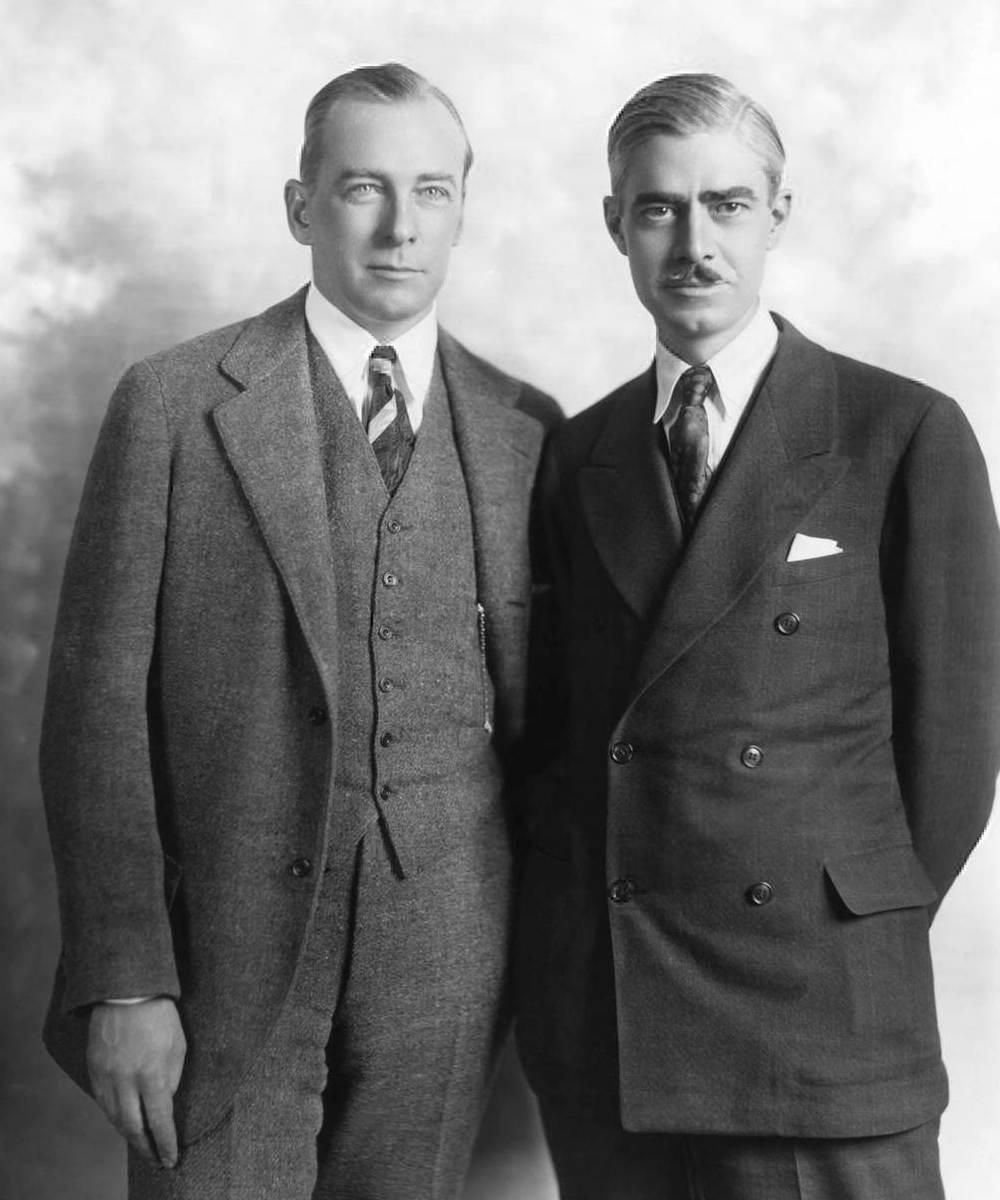
George Abbott and Philip Dunning (1928)

Dunning began his career at age 12 as an extra and a carnival magician, and enlisted in the Navy during World War I. President Woodrow Wilson having made up his mind to visit Europe, Dunning was assigned to the SS George Washington to keep the President's party and the officers and crew in a happy frame of mind. One of his shipboard hits was a farce called Uncle Tom's Stateroom. The President enjoyed it and wrote his appreciation and signature on his program as a memento for Dunning. One of the acts, Every Sailor, ran for 65 consecutive weeks in vaudeville after the war.

Dunning collaborated with George Abbott to create Broadway, one of the most successful plays of the 1920s. Dunning and Abbott produced Twentieth Century, the Ben Hecht-Charles MacArthur satire on the theater. Dunning served in the Navy during World War II and produced the all-Navy show Biff! Bang! He worked in Hollywood for Darryl Zanuck as a screenwriter.

== Death ==
Dunning and his wife had been swimming at Westport's Compo Beach. Upon their return home, Dunning complained of shortness of breath. He died of a myocardial infarction on the way to Norwalk Hospital and is interred in Assumption Cemetery, Westport, Connecticut.
