= High Bridge (New York City) =

Bridge between Manhattan and the Bronx, New York

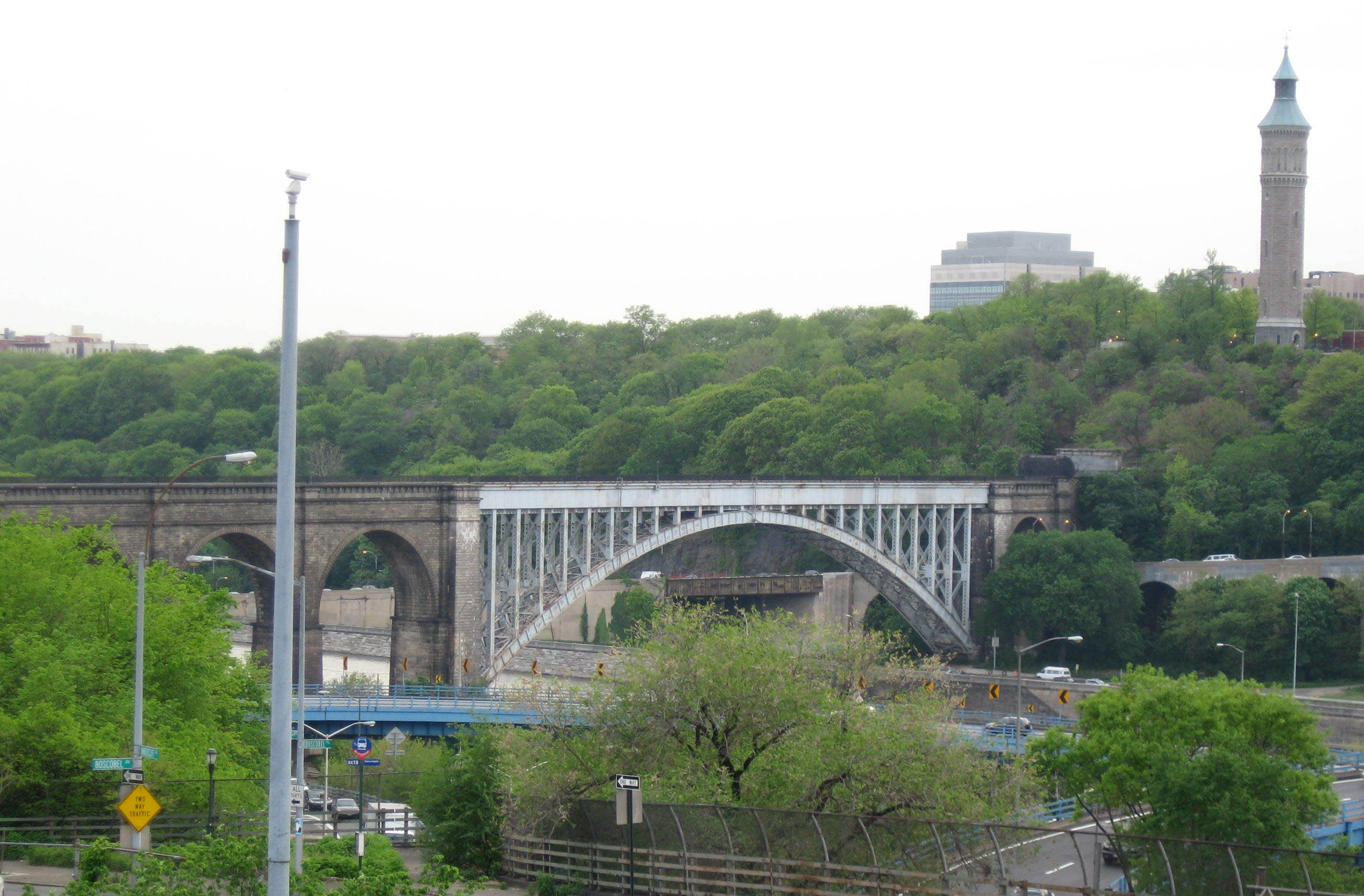
- Coordinates: 40.8423°N 73.9302°W
- Carries: Pedestrians and bicycles
- Crosses: Harlem River
- Locale: Manhattan and the Bronx, New York City
- Other name: Aqueduct Bridge
- Named for: The high elevation of the Croton Aqueduct above the Harlem River
- Owner: Government of New York City
- Maintained by: NYC Parks
- Preceded by: Alexander Hamilton Bridge
- Followed by: Macombs Dam Bridge

Characteristics
- Design: Steel and stone arch bridge
- Total length: 1,450 ft (440 m)
- Height: 140 ft (43 m)
- Longest span: 450 ft (140 m)
- No. of spans: 11 (originally 15)
- Piers in water: 0 (originally 4)
- Clearance below: 114 ft (35 m)

History
- Architect: John B. Jervis, James Renwick Jr.
- Constructed by: George Law, Samuel Roberts, and Arnold Mason
- Construction start: August 13, 1839
- Construction cost: $963,427.80 (Note: Equivalent to $28.2 million in 2024)
- Opened: May 30, 1848 (aqueduct); 1864 (walkway)
- Rebuilt: 1926–1928
- Closed: 1958 (water supply); 1970s – 2015 (pedestrians)

Statistics
- High Bridge
- U.S. National Register of Historic Places
- U.S. National Historic Landmark District – Contributing property
- New York State Register of Historic Places
- New York City Landmark
- Part of: Croton Aqueduct (ID74001324)
- NRHP reference No.: 72001560
- NYSRHP No.: 06101.006666
- NYCL No.: 0639

Significant dates
- Added to NRHP: December 4, 1972
- Designated NHLDCP: April 27, 1992
- Designated NYSRHP: June 23, 1980
- Designated NYCL: November 10, 1970

Location
- Interactive map of High Bridge

The High Bridge (originally the Aqueduct Bridge) is a steel arch bridge connecting Manhattan and the Bronx in New York City, New York, United States. Rising 140 ft (43 m) over the Harlem River, it is the city's oldest major bridge, having opened as part of the Croton Aqueduct in 1848. The eastern end is located in the Highbridge section of the Bronx, near the intersection of University Avenue and 170th Street, and the western end is located in Highbridge Park in Manhattan, near the intersection of Amsterdam Avenue and 172nd Street. Operated and maintained by the New York City Department of Parks and Recreation, the bridge is a New York City designated landmark and is listed on the National Register of Historic Places.

The High Bridge, measuring 1,450 feet (440 m) long, spans a valley that contains the Harlem River. The original bridge had fifteen stone round arches, each measuring either 50 or 80 feet (15 or 24 m) long. The five arches over the Harlem River were replaced by a single 450-foot (140 m) steel arch between 1926 and 1928. The bridge originally carried water pipes, and gatehouses at both ends controlled the flow of water in these pipes. In addition, the High Bridge Water Tower (which is still extant) pumped water to the Highbridge Reservoir at the Manhattan end.

The High Bridge was proposed in 1839 in lieu of a low-level bridge or a tunnel carrying water across the Harlem River, and water began flowing across the bridge in May 1848. The bridge originally carried two water tubes; a third tube and a walkway were added in the early 1860s. The bridge was proposed for demolition in the 1910s and 1920s, as it posed a hazard to navigation on the Harlem River. The city government approved the demolition in 1923 before instead ratifying a separate proposal to reconstruct only the central arch. Water stopped flowing across the bridge in 1958, and the bridge was closed to all traffic by the early 1970s due to safety concerns. A restoration began in 2013, following several years of planning, and the bridge was reopened to pedestrians and bicycles on June 9, 2015.

== Site ==
The High Bridge is an arch bridge between Manhattan and the Bronx in New York City, New York, U.S.. It carries pedestrians, bicycles, and the Old Croton Aqueduct over the Harlem River. Within the bridge's vicinity, the Harlem River is in a valley between Manhattan to the west and the Bronx to the east. The valley floor (which includes the riverbed) is made of Inwood marble, which erodes more easily than either the Manhattan schist on the Manhattan side or the Fordham gneiss on the Bronx side. The terrain on the Manhattan side is steeper than on the Bronx side, and the slope in the Bronx was originally forested. The river measures about 620 feet (190 m) wide at this location. New York City Department of Parks and Recreation (NYC Parks) owns the land at both ends of the bridge. Approximately 1,500 feet (460 m) north is the Washington Bridge, and between the two spans is the newer Alexander Hamilton Bridge. To the south is the Macombs Dam Bridge.

The bridge's Manhattan terminus is accessed via Highbridge Park in Washington Heights. The nearest park entrance is at the intersection of Amsterdam Avenue and 172nd Street, and there originally were steps leading to the former Highbridge Reservoir and a trail running south to 155th Street. Within Manhattan, the High Bridge crosses over ramps leading to the Trans-Manhattan Expressway, as well as Harlem River Drive along the western shore of the Harlem River. East of the river, the bridge crosses the Metro-North Railroad's Hudson Line, the Major Deegan Expressway (carrying Interstate 87), and Sedgwick Avenue. The Bronx terminus contains a seating area with tables. The bridge's walkway continues east to University Avenue and 170th Street in Highbridge. A set of 168 steps descends from that intersection; the staircase is divided into staggered flights, rising 88 feet (27 m) over a run of 207 feet (63 m).

== Design ==
Built in 1848, the High Bridge is the oldest surviving major bridge in New York City and is sometimes cited as the city's oldest extant bridge of any kind. It is also the oldest of the bridges leading into Manhattan, and it was the last bridge constructed across the Harlem River before the Bronx was annexed into New York City in 1874. The High Bridge was originally part of the Old Croton Aqueduct, which carried water from the Croton River watershed to supply the then-burgeoning city of New York (now part of Manhattan). Sources disagree on whether the bridge has a height of 138 feet (42 m) or 140 ft (43 m) above the Harlem River, with a total length of 1,450 ft (440 m). (Note: Some sources cite a height of 114 feet (35 m), 116 feet (35 m), or 123 feet (37 m). This only refers to the clearance, not the height of the deck.) The central arch provides 114 feet (35 m) of vertical clearance at mean high water.

The design was led by Croton Aqueduct engineer John B. Jervis, who replaced David Bates Douglass, the aqueduct's original engineer. James Renwick Jr., who went on to design St. Patrick's Cathedral in Midtown Manhattan, participated in the design. The bridge is owned and operated by various agencies of the New York City government. The New York City Department of Parks and Recreation (NYC Parks) owns the physical structure and oversees its operations and long-term maintenance. The New York City Department of Environmental Protection owns the pipes carrying the Croton Aqueduct over the bridge, and the New York City Department of Transportation assists with the bridge's maintenance.

=== Arches ===
The bridge was constructed with fifteen semicircular arches. The design bears similarities to ancient Roman aqueducts; one source cites the Pont du Gard in France as a particular inspiration. There were originally eight wide arches, measuring 80 feet (24 m) long, and seven narrow arches, measuring 50 feet (15 m) long. (Note: A Scientific American article gives a figure of eight wide and five narrow arches.) The wide arches, most of which have been replaced, originally spanned the river; the narrow arches, which still exist, spanned the shoreline on either side. The stonework for the arches is made of Maine granite, supplied by at least ten quarries in New York and New England. Gneiss is also used for the arches' interiors.

The arches are supported by piers measuring 20 by 40 feet (6.1 by 12.2 m) across at ground level. There were originally ten piers on the shoreline (including the abutments at either end) and six within the river. The foundations of each pier consist of oak pilings, with concrete poured into the gaps between the pilings. The mid-river piers were built on mud; workers constructed cofferdams to surround the pilings and concrete, and a series of wooden grillages were built atop the pilings. For the piers on the shoreline, the pilings were inserted into pits; concrete was then poured around each piling, and stones were laid atop the concrete. The springers—where the lowest sections of the arches curve outward from the piers—are placed about 84 feet (26 m) above mean high water. Above the springers (between the spandrel panels at the top corners of each arch), the interiors of the piers were made as hollow as possible. Excess water from the deck drained into the side walls of the piers. Each pair of adjacent arches served as counterweights, holding up the piers beneath them. The Bronx abutments have a pair of arched doors for maintenance.

Due to the fast-moving waters of the Harlem River, the piers in the middle of the river originally created a navigational hazard, as watercraft were vulnerable to crashing into them. The piers did not run perpendicularly to the river channel, which meant that many barges had less than eight feet (2.4 m) of horizontal clearance when passing through the arches. In the late 1920s, the five mid-river arches were demolished and replaced with a larger steel arch measuring about 400 feet (120 m) long. The existing piers at each end of the steel arch were enlarged to serve as abutments. The remaining stone portions of the bridge mostly retain the original design. The arches are illuminated at night by LEDs.

=== Deck ===
==== Pipes ====
Prior to 1861, water from the aqueduct was carried across the bridge via a pair of pipes, variously cited as measuring 33 inches (84 cm) or 36 inches (91 cm) in diameter. These tubes were surrounded by a chamber that could accommodate additional pipes in the future, and a five-foot-thick (150 cm) earthen embankment surrounded the tubes to protect them from extreme temperatures. The carrying capacity was enlarged in 1861–1862 with a larger tube, made of wrought iron. Measuring about 90 inches (230 cm) in diameter, (Note: Sometimes cited as 90.5 inches (2,300 mm)) it was built above the existing pipes, resting on cast iron pedestals placed between the two original pipes. A brick arch, measuring 12 inches (300 mm) thick with a 17-foot (5.2 m) radius, surrounds the largest pipe. A manhole provides access to the pipes midway across the bridge, and the largest pipe has two granite ventilators as well.

The pipes are lower than the rest of the aqueduct on both ends of the bridge, forming a siphon. In the Bronx, the aqueduct descends 12 feet (3.7 m) toward the bridge, while in Manhattan, the aqueduct ascends 10 feet (3.0 m) before continuing its southward trajectory. The water tunnels leading to the pipes remain intact in the early 21st century. The pipes also remain in place under the pedestrian walkway, although the interior of the largest pipe had rusted extensively by 2010.

==== Walkway ====
The top of the deck has a walkway with a brick pavement arranged in a herringbone pattern. The deck has never carried vehicles, and the walkway was originally accessible only by stairs at either end. The original bricks, made of Hudson River clay, had darkened by the early 2010s (before the renovation). The current walkway has been open since 2015; it is ADA-accessible and is open between 7 a.m. and 10 p.m. seven days a week. The brick walkway, which has been restored to its original design, contains embedded plaques depicting the aqueduct's history. There are Victorian-style lampposts along the walkway, as well as brick-and-granite parapets on either side.

== History ==
The island of Manhattan, surrounded by brackish rivers, originally had numerous small sources of freshwater, including springs, streams, and lakes. All of these had been polluted or eliminated by the 18th century as modern New York City grew. As such, there were proposals to bring water from outside Manhattan via an aqueduct crossing the Harlem River; the first such plan was made in 1778, when Manhattan residents suggested that water be obtained from Rye Pond in Westchester. As the city was devastated by cholera in 1832 and the Great Fire in 1835, the inadequacy of the water system of wells and cisterns became apparent, and numerous corrective measures were examined. Efforts to bring freshwater from the Croton River watershed in New York's Hudson Valley, north of the city, commenced in the early 1830s. David Bates Douglass was appointed the chief engineer of what would become the Old Croton Aqueduct in 1835; in this capacity, he was tasked with designing the High Bridge. He was replaced the next year by John B. Jervis, who oversaw construction of the entire aqueduct. Work on the Old Croton Aqueduct began in 1837, and it began supplying water in 1842.

The aqueduct measured 41 miles (66 km) long, running from Old Croton Dam in Westchester to the modern boroughs of the Bronx (Note: At the time of the aqueduct's construction, the Bronx was part of Westchester, not New York City.) and Manhattan in New York City. It used a classic gravity feed, running through an enclosed brick-and-masonry structure for most of its length. University Avenue was later built over the southernmost portion of the aqueduct's Bronx section, leading to the bridge. Between the Bronx and Manhattan, the aqueduct had to cross the Harlem River valley, which was 1,450 feet (440 m) wide. On the Manhattan side, the aqueduct continued south under Amsterdam Avenue, leading to the Central Park and Murray Hill reservoirs. In addition to the High Bridge, the aqueduct had other above-ground structures including gatehouses, reservoirs, ventilators, weirs, and a bridge above the Sing Sing Kill stream in Westchester.

=== Development ===
==== Planning ====
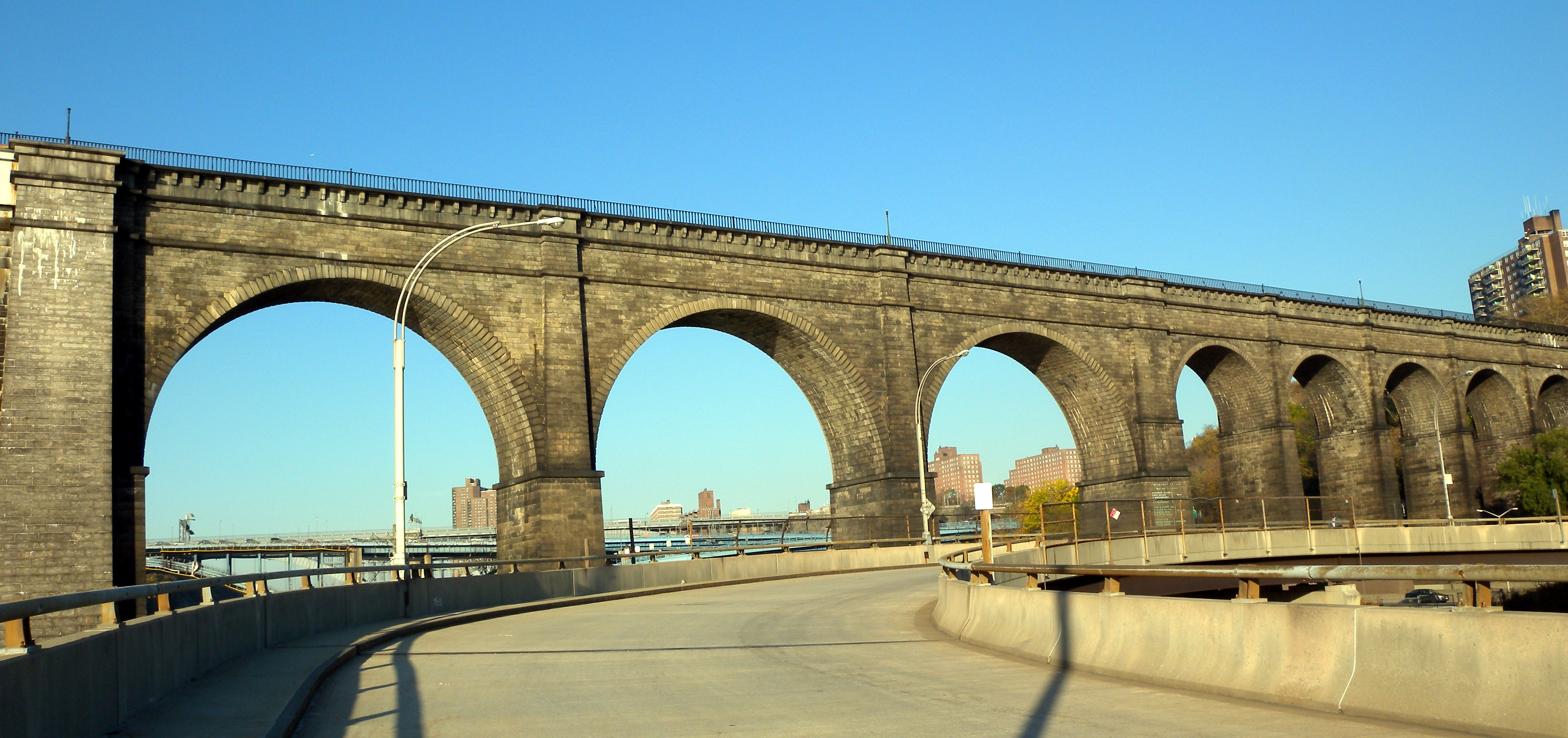
Archways in the Bronx

The means of carrying the Croton Aqueduct across the Harlem River valley was highly debated, and there was particular debate over the height of the bridge. Early plans called for a high-level bridge, which, due to the aqueduct's gravity-fed design, would allow the water tubes to maintain a steady downward slope. In 1832, before the aqueduct's construction had been approved, the engineer DeWitt Clinton Jr. (son of former Governor DeWitt Clinton) proposed a 138-foot-high (42 m) bridge across the Harlem River. Douglass, who surveyed two alternate routes for the aqueduct, in 1833 similarly proposed a span measuring 126 feet (38 m) high. Despite the high-level plan's expense, (Note: The cost of the high-level plan was pegged at $835,000 or $935,000. This would be equivalent to $24.3–27.2 million in 2024.) Douglass felt the aqueduct's importance was worth the cost. The bridge would be 1,450 feet (440 m) long, making it the country's longest stone arch bridge. A competing proposal for the aqueduct in 1835 came from the engineer John Martineau, who proposed a low-level bridge across the Harlem River and embankments on either side. The aqueduct would have been higher than the low bridge at both ends, requiring a siphon, or inverted U-shaped tube, to bring water down and back up. Martineau's plan was similar to Douglass's plan, except for the low bridge across the Harlem River, which was substantially less expensive than Douglass's proposed high bridge.

When Jervis took over the aqueduct's development, he conducted a report in 1837, assessing both the low-level and high-level plans. Jervis ultimately rejected the high-level plan, citing the cost efficiency of the low-level proposal. The low-level bridge would have been easier to build, and it would have cost approximately $425,000, (Note: Equivalent to $12.3 million in 2024) about half the cost of the high-level bridge's approximate cost of $935,000. (Note: Equivalent to $27.2 million in 2024) Jervis said that no similarly-sized high-level bridge "will be so expensive in laying up or require so great a portion of large stones or the same exactness of execution", while also being inconvenient to access. Jervis's plan called for a set of pipes to carry water at either end of the bridge, along with a pipe chamber at the eastern end. Sources disagree on whether the low-level bridge was originally planned to have provided 30 feet (9.1 m) or 50 feet (15 m) of vertical clearance. Jervis later revised his plans to provide 65 feet (20 m) of clearance.

The Water Commission, which oversaw the aqueduct's development, initially approved the low-level bridge on October 12, 1838. The New York Evening Post spoke in favor of the low-level plan, while the New-York American supported the high-level plan. Opponents of the low-level bridge claimed it would disrupt the aqueduct's steady slope, and they bought advertisements in newspapers, which suggested that contractors for any low-level bridge would not receive remuneration. Some of the opponents, who were planning the Harlem River Ship Canal to connect the Harlem River with the Hudson River to the west, also feared that a low bridge would obstruct navigation. Other advocates for a high bridge, including the Morris family, claimed that the Harlem River was an "arm of the sea" and should not be obstructed. Ultimately, the New York State Legislature passed a law banning a low bridge. This law, passed in May 1839, mandated that the aqueduct cross the Harlem River on a bridge at least 100 feet (30 m) high, or through a tunnel underneath the river. Jervis subsequently prepared plans for a masonry bridge measuring exactly 100 feet high, with pipes forming a siphon at either end. The water commissioners accepted these plans in mid-1839.

===== Construction =====
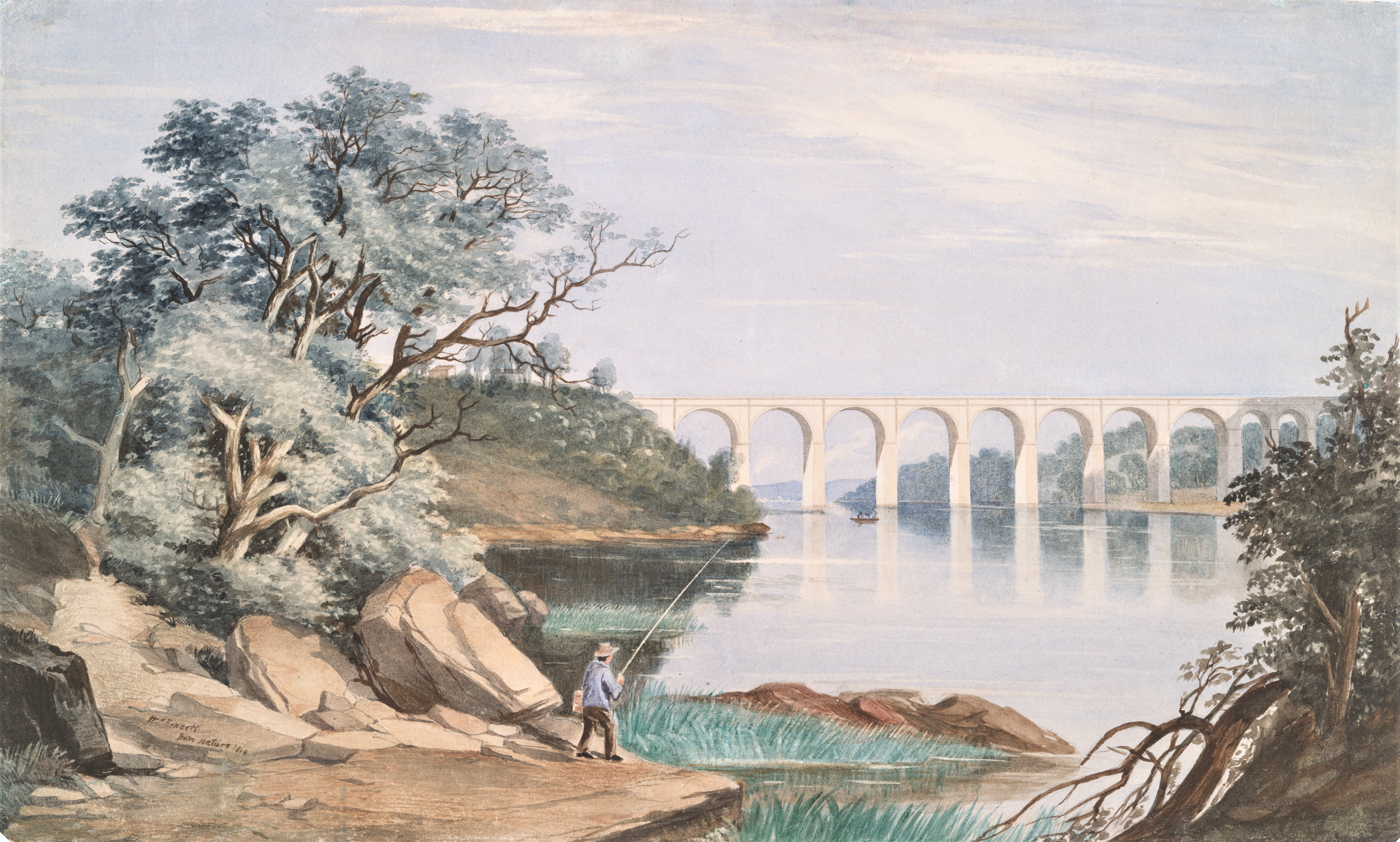
A painting of the bridge by William James Bennett

The High Bridge's construction contracts were among the last to be awarded during the development of the Croton Aqueduct. A contract for a low-lying bridge was awarded to Ellsworth, Mix & Co. in 1838, but this contract was rescinded after the low-bridge ban was enacted. Bids for a high-level bridge were solicited on June 15, 1839, and a contract was awarded on August 13 of that year. The contract went to a firm led by George Law, Samuel Roberts, and Arnold Mason. The consortium had submitted the second-lowest bid of $755,130, (Note: Equivalent to $21.9 million in 2024) but the lowest bidder had dropped out before the contract was awarded. A fourth leader of the firm, Timothy N. Ferrell, had resigned prior to his firm's receiving the contract. Ferrell, Law, and Roberts had built other parts of the aqueduct, while Arnold Mason had prior engineering experience working on the Erie Canal and the Morris Canal. Construction began that year, but with little progress having occurred by the end of 1839, Jervis terminated Law's and Roberts's existing Croton Aqueduct contracts so they could focus on the bridge's construction.

Foundations for the support piers were being built by early 1840, but work progressed slowly because of the project's complexity and the contractors' inexperience with large structures. The entire board of water commissioners was replaced when a new governor was elected in early 1841. The new commissioners asked Jervis to consider several options (including canceling the bridge and instead constructing a tunnel) to reduce the project's cost, but he rejected the suggestions after studying their feasibility. By the end of 1841, only five of the piers had progressed above mean high water. The foundations for some piers had not even been started, in part because of the presence of loose boulders below ground. In advance of the aqueduct's opening in 1842, a temporary pipe measuring three feet (0.91 m) across was constructed across the Harlem River, just above the waterline. This pipe was laid atop the cofferdams, with an experimental 115-foot-tall (35 m) fountain shooting up from its midpoint. Work on the pipe commenced in early June 1842, and the pipe was completed in time for the aqueduct's opening on July 4. (Note: Water first flowed through the pipe on June 27 but did not reach the end of the aqueduct until July 4.) The West Point Foundry Association received the contract for the temporary pipe and was later rehired to construct the permanent pipes.

The water commissioners were replaced in 1843 following another election, and the final mid-river pier had progressed above the waterline by that August. With some of the other piers having been completed by then, the contractors began installing the piers' Maine granite cladding in December 1843. Work was delayed due to issues in granite delivery and a shortage of skilled stonecutters. The piers and abutments were nearly finished by December 1845, but only a small number of arches had been started. Because the deck's permanent pipes and parapets could not be built until the arches were completed, contractors built several arches simultaneously. The contract for permanent piping was awarded in 1847. Jervis had proposed that the bridge's pipes be built to a diameter of four feet (1.2 m), but they were ultimately built with a smaller diameter of three feet (0.91 m). Jervis also requested that the bridge's capacity be expanded from one to two tubes, which he believed would provide sufficient capacity for three decades.

Yet another new board of water commissioners was appointed in 1848; the new commissioners proposed constructing a vehicular carriageway, which was ultimately not built. During that year, the temporary pipe was moved to the bridge deck, and the pipe's temporary fountain was removed. The bridge began carrying water on May 30, 1848. Contractors put finishing touches on the bridge through the rest of the year, covering the pipes with masonry and removing the cofferdams. Construction was completed in November 1848 at a cost of $963,427.80, (Note: Equivalent to $28.2 million in 2024) at which point it was among the longest bridges in the United States. Officially, the crossing was known as the Aqueduct Bridge, but colloquially it became known as the High Bridge, after its most prominent attribute. With nearly all work completed (except for a stair to the bridge's western terminus), the board of water commissioners was disbanded in 1849, and the Croton Aqueduct Department took over the bridge's operation.

=== Mid-19th to early 20th century ===
After its completion, the bridge became an important part of the Croton Aqueduct. The bridge was frequently used for day trips into the countryside, and people sometimes jumped from the bridge for leisure. During the early 1860s, amid the American Civil War, armed guards were stationed at the bridge to protect it from potential Confederate Army sabotage. A New York Times article from that decade described the Manhattan side as being a popular site for picnics. Despite proposals for a roadway atop the High Bridge, no vehicular crossings of the Harlem River were possible until the Washington Bridge opened to the north in 1889.

==== Early years and capacity expansions ====
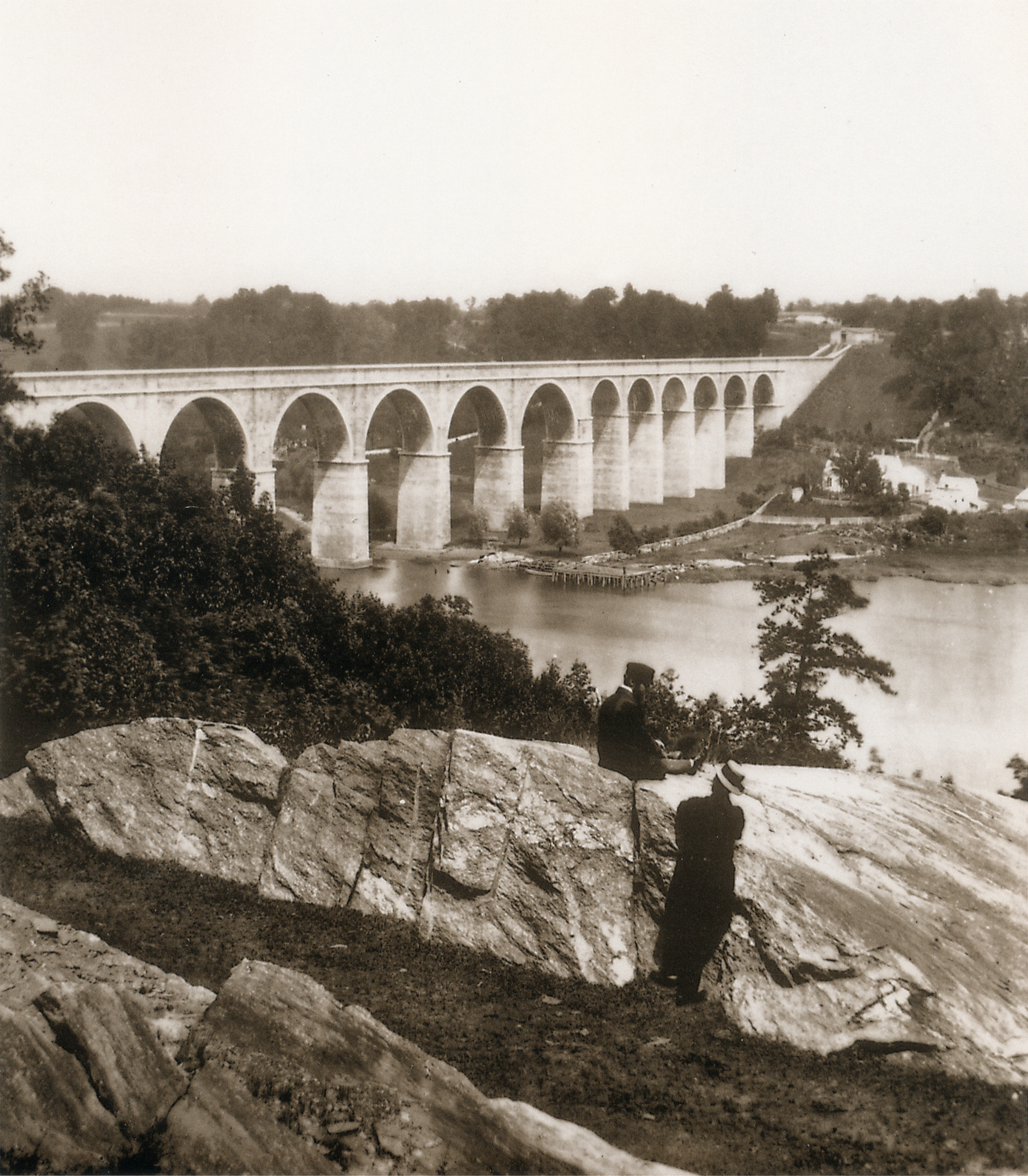
Photo from William England, 1859

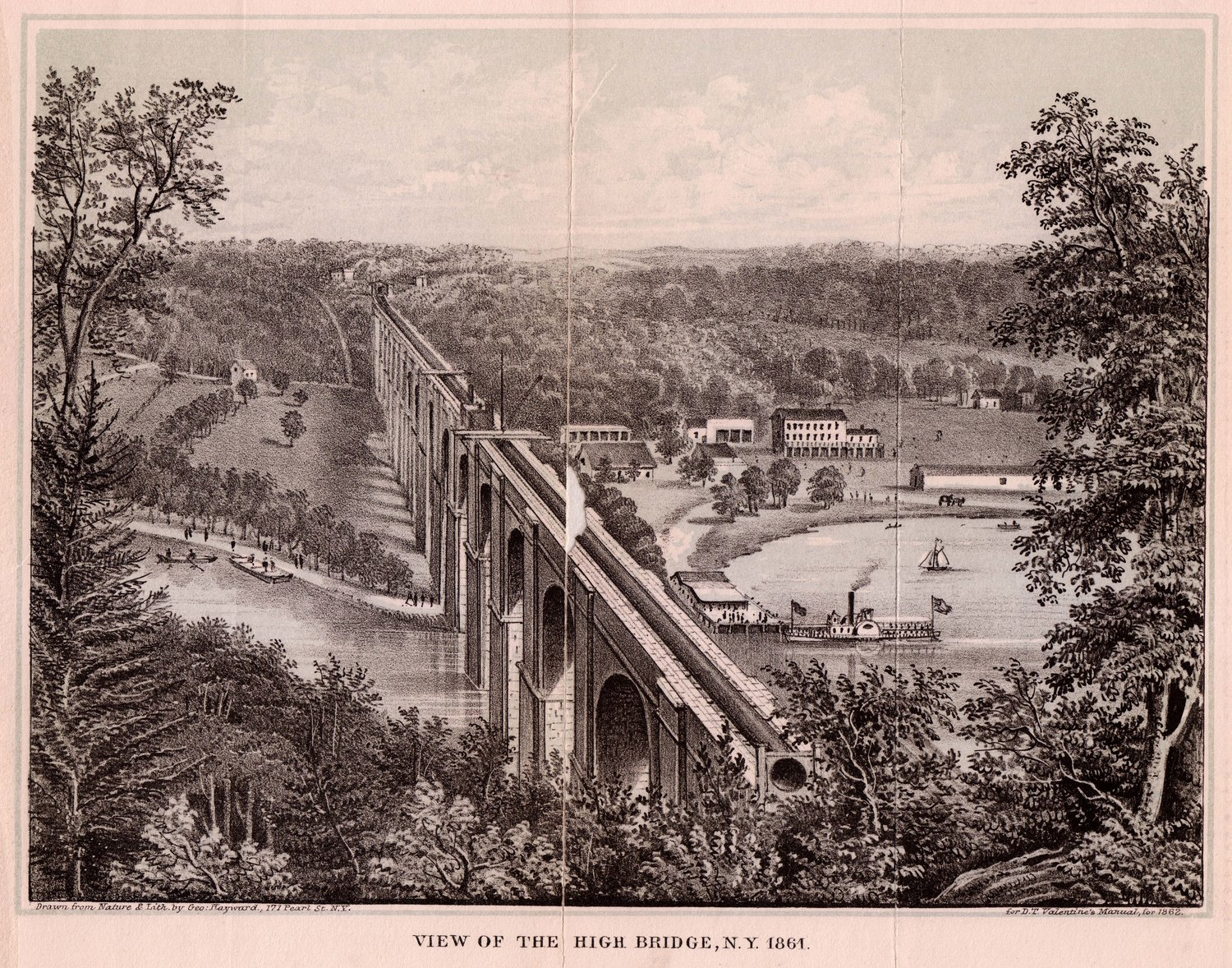
View of the High Bridge with third pipe being constructed, 1861

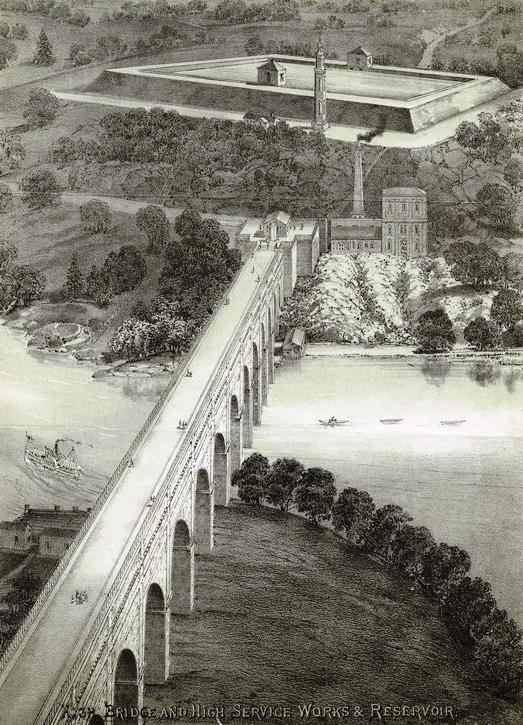
The High Bridge, High Bridge Water Tower, and Highbridge Reservoir in 1871

A wrought iron handrail was added in 1850, and two of the mid-river arches were dredged that year, allowing small ships to pass. The bridge originally carried two tubes, which created a bottleneck because of their limited capacity relative to the rest of the aqueduct. The rest of the aqueduct could carry up to 60 million U.S. gallons (230,000,000 L) daily, but the bridge had half that capacity, forcing excess water to be drained into the Harlem River. As early as 1853, the Croton Aqueduct Board proposed that a third pipe measuring 4.5 feet (1.4 m) wide be built across the bridge. This pipe was not built; instead, an additional pipe was built at the Manhattan end of the bridge to supply reservoirs further south. A road atop the bridge was also unsuccessfully proposed in 1858. Because of the steep hills at both ends, it was not feasible to construct vehicular ramps to the bridge.

The aqueduct was operating near capacity by the late 1850s, prompting proposals for an additional pipe. Two engineers prepared plans for expanding the bridge's capacity, which were presented to the city government in November 1859; the fate of their proposal was not documented. A second proposal by the engineer Alfred Craven, for a 90-inch-wide (2,300 mm) tube, was approved the next year. Horace Abbott & Sons Canton Rolling Mills supplied the metal, while Sneden & Rowland were hired to install the pipe. After a foundation for the pipe was prepared in mid-1860, installation began later that year. Large cranes were used to lift the pieces of the pipe onto the deck. After the new pipe had been laid by January 1862, it began carrying water that year. Afterward, a brick parapet was constructed atop the deck, and a masonry arch was built above the larger tube; the top of the arch created a flat surface for a walkway. Completed in 1864, the walkway was an incidental feature of the bridge, which was intended foremost to carry water. As built, the path curved around the existing tubes.

Work on a water tower and a reservoir began on the Manhattan side in 1866. The reservoir was to store 20 million US gallons (76,000,000 L), accommodating residents of Manhattan who could not receive water from the Central Park or 42nd Street reservoirs; it was located above the level of the bridge, requiring the use of a tower. In tandem with the tower and reservoir's construction, a wharf, coal conveyor, coalhouse, boiler house, and pump were developed. The water tower, reservoir, and associated structures were completed in 1872. The new infrastructure allowed the aqueduct to serve additional buildings in Manhattan; without the water tower and reservoir, the aqueduct could not serve structures uphill of the Murray Hill reservoir due to insufficient water pressure. Lighting was installed along the walkway some time after 1872.

==== Further modifications ====
The New York City Department of Public Works took over the bridge's operation from the Croton Aqueduct Department in 1870. Meanwhile, the Old Croton Aqueduct could not keep up with the growth of New York City. The tubes were again nearing capacity by 1875, at which point the aqueduct carried 100 million U.S. gallons (380,000,000 L) per day. Additionally, the existing aqueduct was starting to leak. The bridge's brick arches were modified that year to allow more water to flow through them. Construction on the New Croton Aqueduct began in 1885, providing a second means through which water from the Croton River watershed could enter Manhattan. The first part of the new aqueduct opened in 1890 and ran under the Harlem River in a tunnel. The Old Croton Aqueduct continued to operate.

Pedestrians frequented the bridge in the late 19th and early 20th centuries, and they also visited nearby parts of Upper Manhattan. Scientific American stated that the bridge was an attraction in itself, which the New-York Tribune described as "beloved of poets and picnickers". The Wall Street Journal wrote that, at the turn of the 20th century, the bridge was a popular meetup spot for dates, where people could "see and be seen". People sometimes jumped from the bridge, including both suicide jumpers and stuntmen. In 1886, a stone staircase at the Bronx end was constructed, descending to the Bronx shoreline; this staircase replaced a set of wooden steps and a temporary incline railway that carried visitors up the hill. Following the 1898 establishment of the City of Greater New York, the newly enlarged city's Department of Water Supply (known as the Department of Water Supply, Gas and Electricity, or DSWGE, after 1902) took control of the aqueduct and bridge. Even though the High Bridge carried pedestrian traffic, the commissioner of the New York City Department of Bridges said that the crossing was technically not a bridge, but an aqueduct, and as such did not assume jurisdiction of the structure.

Due to decreased demand, water temporarily stopped flowing across the bridge in 1910; over the next five decades, water service was intermittently resumed and paused again for similar reasons. The DSWGE proposed constructing a 12- or 20-inch-wide (30 or 51 cm) pipe in 1911, which would supplement the existing pipes, and it selected the 12-inch alternative the next year. The pipe was ultimately not installed due to debates over cost, as well as concerns that part of the bridge would be damaged by the work; the steps leading to the bridge's western terminus would also require demolition. A third aqueduct, the Catskill Aqueduct, began supplying water in 1917. Due to concerns that enemy combatants could sabotage the city's water supply system during World War I, the section of the Old Croton Aqueduct over the bridge stopped operating on February 3 of that year. At the time, city officials anticipated that the New Croton and Catskill aqueducts would be sufficient to serve Manhattan.

=== Partial replacement ===
As early as the 1890s, the city and federal governments had been trying to improve navigation along the Harlem River. This process involved constructing the Harlem River Ship Canal (which opened in 1895) and removing obstacles such as narrow or low bridges. By the early 20th century, the High Bridge was the Harlem River's oldest surviving fixed crossing, as well as the only crossing of any kind between the Washington Bridge to the north and the Putnam Bridge at 155th Street to the south.

==== Early demolition proposals ====
By 1911, the United States Army Corps of Engineers (USACE) had raised concerns that the piers in the middle of the river created obstacles for watercraft. After businesses and property owners in the Bronx shared similar complaints, a report about the bridge was submitted to the city government in 1915. Plans to replace the bridge were paused for several years, and city engineers studied a proposal to remove some of the mid-river piers instead of the entire bridge. Governor Al Smith appointed a committee in 1919 to determine how to improve navigation on the Harlem River. Among other suggestions, the committee recommended that the bridge be demolished and the river be widened. The cost of demolition was estimated at $300,000. (Note: Equivalent to $4.0 million in 2024) Most of the Smith commission's suggestions were uncontroversial, except for the bridge demolition. While local business organizations supported the plan, objections came from both the public and from organizations such as the New York Society of Landscape Architects, the American Institute of Architects (AIA), and the American Society of Civil Engineers (ASCE). One ASCE member argued that it would cost about $800,000 (Note: Equivalent to $9.5 million in 2024) to modify Croton Aqueduct gatehouses if the bridge were removed to remediate the resulting reduction in water flow.

A plan to remove some of the mid-river arches was sent to the state legislature in February 1920 and approved that month. Shortly afterward, the United States Department of War told the city government that the mid-river piers had to be removed because they posed a hindrance to navigation. Two engineers drew up plans to replace part of the bridge with an elliptical arch, and the city government proposed replacing four of the original arches with two wider arches. The American Association of Engineers' local chapter, which preferred the bridge's preservation, asked the New York City Board of Estimate to reject the partial demolition. Several city agencies, groups, and architectural firms created designs for the bridge, five of which were published in January 1921. Despite this, Grover Whalen, the commissioner of the city's Department of Plant and Structure (DPS), recommended the bridge's demolition. The city's Bureau of Water Supply took over the project by 1922. Preliminary surveys for the piers' removal were being conducted by then; these surveys found that the piers had settled several inches. The DWSGE recommended full demolition, as the cost of repairing the piers would more than double the project's original $900,000 budget. (Note: Equivalent to $12.9 million in 2024)

==== Change of plans ====
Local groups resumed their advocacy for the bridge's demolition in 1923. The Board of Estimate recommended demolishing the High Bridge that March, prompting opponents to speak out against the plans. Subsequently, the board agreed to pause its earlier order and study the viability of preserving the bridge. The full Board of Estimate recommended demolishing the entire bridge in June; the masonry would have been reused for an overpass carrying Riverside Drive above Dyckman Street in Inwood, Manhattan. Later that month, engineers and architects convinced the board to instead replace only four of the midriver arches, since this plan would cost $716,000, substantially less than a full demolition. (Note: Equivalent to $10.2 million in 2024) In the nine months after the revised plan was approved, the DPS created plans for a steel arch measuring 420 feet (130 m) long with a clearance of 103 feet (31 m), at an estimated cost of $1 million. (Note: Equivalent to $14.5 million in 2024) The new design was approved by the Municipal Art Commission in April 1924 and by the US Department of War the next month.

The engineer Merritt H. Smith of Yonkers, New York, was appointed to oversee the modifications. Plant and Structures Commissioner William Wirt Mills began sending out specifications for the new arch to potential contractors in late 1925; the lowest bid, at $1.481 million, was rejected. (Note: Equivalent to $19.8 million in 2024) The plans were modified to call for the removal of five arches, rather than four, at a cost of $1.1 million. (Note: Equivalent to $15.6 million in 2024) The revised contract was approved by the Board of Estimate in June 1926 and by the Department of War in August. The Patrick J. Cox Construction Company received a $1.09 million contract to construct the central span in September 1926. (Note: Equivalent to $15.4 million in 2024) That year, the coal conveyor and service building in Manhattan were demolished, and the disused coal conveyor tunnel was closed.

Reconstruction began on October 26, 1926, with a small ceremony. The entire project was initially scheduled to take one year, but it took nine months just to destroy the five midriver arches, a process that involved demolishing the old deck, pipes, and piers. The new arch's construction required converting two of the remaining piers into abutments and reconstructing the aqueduct's larger pipe. Some of the masonry was recycled for a retaining wall in the Bronx, and new masonry was ordered for the rebuilt piers. In addition, new lighting was installed on the deck. The new span began carrying water on April 15, 1928. The bridge was rededicated on October 27, 1928—almost exactly two years after construction started—with a ceremony attended by 2,500 people and a maritime parade. The replacement span cost about $1 million in total. (Note: Equivalent to $14.4 million in 2024) The New York Daily News wrote that "one of the serious drawbacks to shipping is no more", quoting a real estate expert who predicted that business on the Harlem River would grow as a result.

=== Mid- and late 20th century ===
==== Reduced aqueduct operations ====
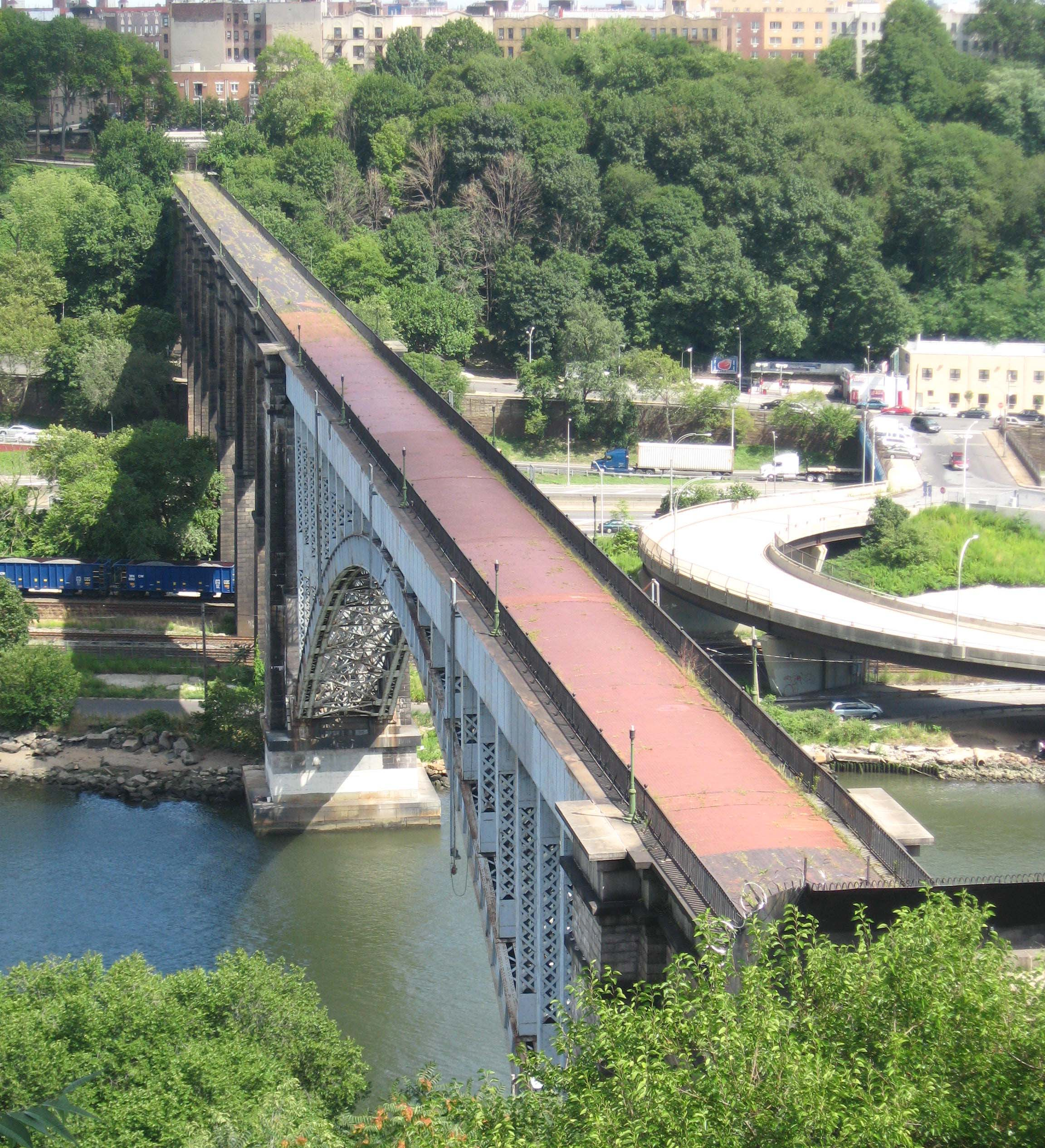
View of the closed bridge from Highbridge Park in 2008

After the new center span was built, the DSWGE gradually transferred some land at each end of the bridge to NYC Parks, particularly after Robert Moses became parks commissioner in 1929. In the 1930s, the High Bridge remained part of the Old Croton Aqueduct system, though the portion running over the bridge had been temporarily closed off during the reconstruction project. Even after the bridge reopened, the aqueduct remained unused south of Ossining, New York, because the embankments were in very poor shape. As such, the New York City government announced plans in 1931 to rebuild the section of the aqueduct leading to the High Bridge. The land surrounding the reservoir and tower in Manhattan was transferred to NYC Parks in 1934, and another parcel adjoining University Avenue at the Bronx end was transferred to that agency in 1937. The bridge also underwent maintenance work during that decade, including the installation of a fence on the Bronx side in 1935 and the repainting of the metalwork in 1939. Although a source from 1939 cited the bridge's water tubes as still being in operation, another source from the following year described the tubes as being unused.

The steps at the Bronx end were modified in 1940, and new benches and railings were installed early in that decade. The New York City Board of Estimate took over the staircase at the Bronx end in 1945, and the city's sinking fund acquired adjacent lands in 1949. The water tower on the Manhattan side stopped operating on December 15, 1949, when an electric pump replaced it. Control of the water tower subsequently passed to NYC Parks in 1951, and the adjacent pump plant was demolished around that year.

In the 1950s, the High Bridge remained open to pedestrians, accessible from Manhattan by a wooden staircase. After the DSWGE commissioner said the bridge suffered from "maintenance and vandalism" issues, NYC Parks agreed to take responsibility for the bridge itself in 1955. The ownership transfer, which was not finalized until 1960, excluded control of the gatehouses and the bridge's largest pipe. By then, there had been several incidents in which people threw debris from the bridge. In one case, the debris injured four passengers on Circle Line tour boats passing under the bridge. Local youth also dived off the piers of the High Bridge.

==== Closure and disuse ====
Although water flow through the High Bridge to Manhattan had intermittently stopped and restarted from 1955 onward, the bridge did not permanently stop carrying water until 1958. (Note: One source gives a different figure of 1949.) The Croton Aqueduct Gate House at 135th Street in Manhattan was decommissioned on December 2 of that year, leaving the tubes without an outlet in that borough. Subsequently, the city's Department of Public Works was asked to determine the cost of demolishing the bridge. Following plans from preservationists to save the Old Croton Aqueduct, in 1966, New York Governor Nelson Rockefeller proposed incorporating the High Bridge into a 32-mile (51 km) scenic trail that spanned the aqueduct's route in Westchester and the Bronx. By then, the aqueduct's former route had been divided into several disconnected sections. Ultimately, the trail was established in 1968, but it included only the Westchester section and a small segment within Van Cortlandt Park in the far northern Bronx. During the 1970s, there were proposals to extend Westchester's Croton Aqueduct trail to the High Bridge, running via the Bronx's Aqueduct Walk.

The bridge may have been shuttered to pedestrians as early as 1960. Local residents anecdotally reported that the bridge was open for some time afterward, but a reporter for The New York Times wrote in 1968 that, when he had tried to walk across the bridge, he found it closed. The bridge was definitively closed in the early 1970s. Some sources give a more specific date of 1970, but there is no documentation as to exactly when the bridge was closed, and even NYC Parks does not have records pertaining to the bridge's closure date. By then, high crime and a fiscal crisis had led to the contraction of many city services and public spaces. A high barbed wire fence sealed off both ends. Pedestrians were diverted to nearby vehicular bridges, and the pedestrian path remained closed through the rest of the century. NYC Parks retained responsibility for the bridge's maintenance but refused to reopen it, citing safety concerns and funding shortages.

The bridge gradually decayed in the late 20th century, and it was frequently vandalized and used by trespassers; the aqueduct's largest pipe remained intact. The New York City Art Commission approved plans in 1974 for a renovation of the deck, and the Art Commission and the New York City Landmarks Preservation Commission (LPC) approved a revised plan for the deck renovation in 1979. Subsequently, the railings and brick were partially replaced, and gates were installed at both ends, though the bridge remained closed. Efforts to reopen the bridge began in the 1980s. By the late 1990s, the paths leading to the bridge were so heavily overgrown, one observer said only the paths' lampposts were visible above the weeds. The Manhattan end was used as a dumping ground until the early 2000s, when the adjacent section of Highbridge Park was cleaned. Over time, the public came to neglect the bridge as well; The New York Times wrote in 2012 that "even lifelong residents have no clue that the eyesore in their windows is actually the bridge in Highbridge".

=== 21st century ===
At the turn of the 21st century, there were once again calls for the High Bridge to be reopened as either a pedestrian or bike path. The High Bridge Coalition was established in 2001 to coordinate the bridge's preservation. Formed by four dozen groups and governmental agencies, the coalition sought to raise $1.5 million for a feasibility study on the bridge's condition. The High Bridge Coalition said that reopening the bridge would connect parks at both ends—covering more than 120 acres (0.49 km^{2}) of parkland between them—and provide a link in New York's greenway system. The New York Daily News printed an editorial advocating for the bridge's renovation, the cost of which was estimated at $30 million by 2002.

==== Renovation plans ====
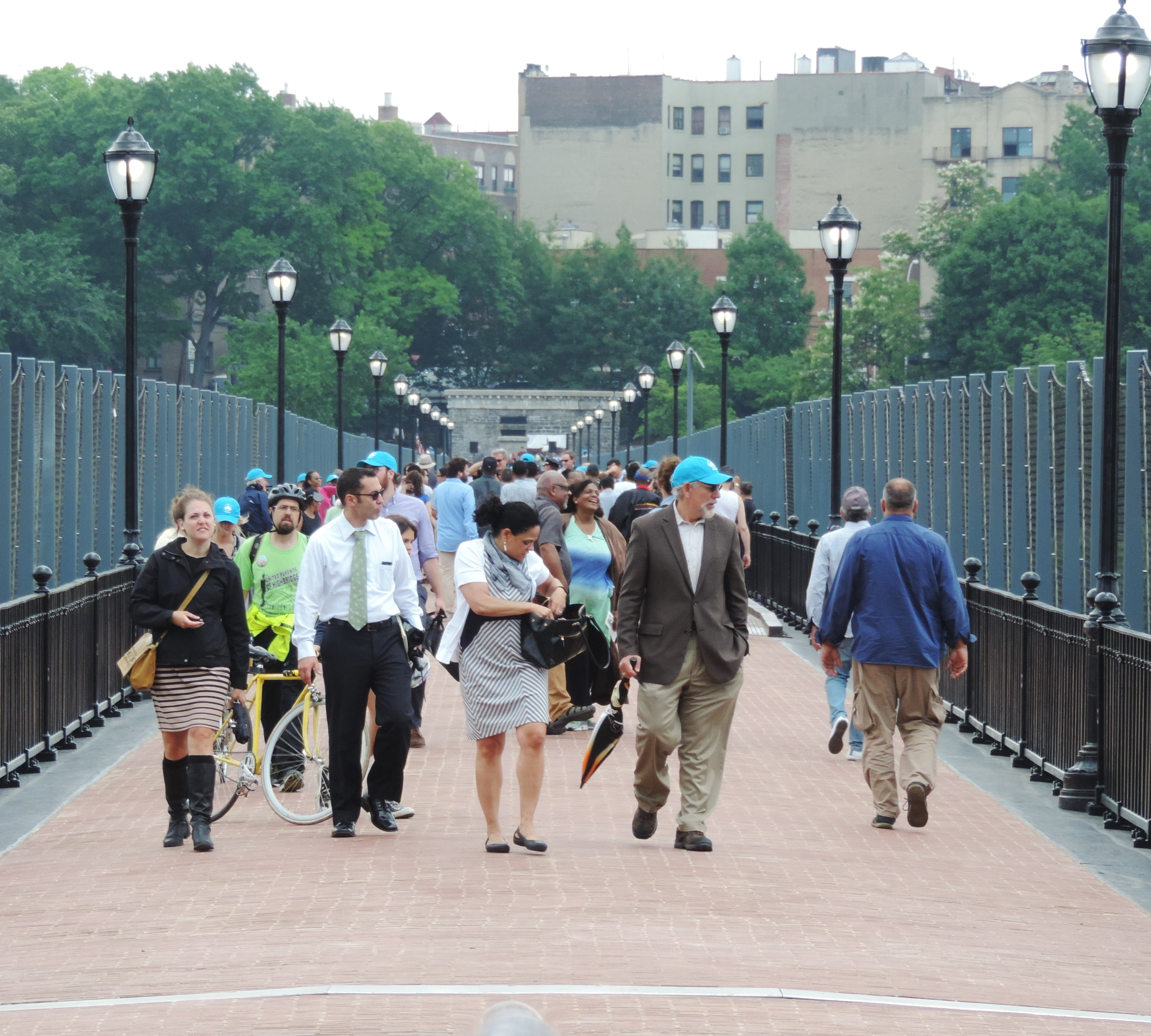
Reopening day, June 9, 2015. Bronxites arrive for the opening ceremony

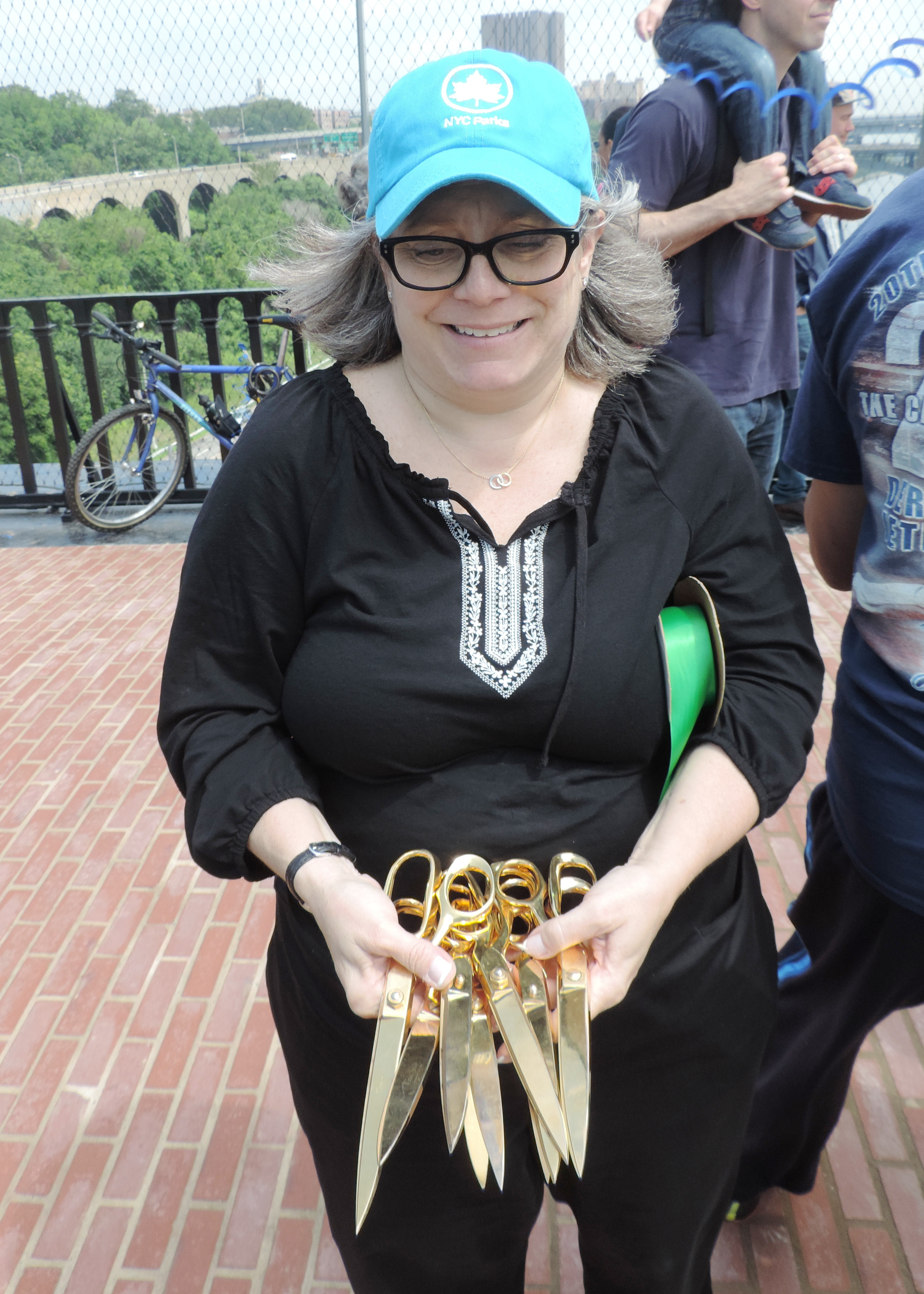
Gold-plated scissors and green ribbon used to reopen the bridge

NYC Parks hosted a celebration for the High Bridge's 155th anniversary in January 2004, when Parks Commissioner Adrian Benepe announced that the New York City Department of Transportation was completing a $1 million study on the feasibility of restoring and reopening the bridge. The study determined that it would cost $30 million to repair issues such as falling masonry, low guardrails, and crumbling stairs. Early studies had also found that one of the arches was deteriorated, increasing the cost of restoration. By 2005, design work was underway, and $3.5 million in city and federal funding had been allocated toward the renovation.

The bridge's feasibility study was published in late 2006. The study estimated that it would cost $20–30 million to bring the bridge to a state of good repair and that a full renovation would total $60 million. At the time, NYC Parks estimated that the bridge could reopen in three years, but the project was not fully funded. The renovation had already received $5 million in federal grants through US Representative José E. Serrano. City officials were seeking to allocate $1 million for the project, which included strengthening the arch, improving staircases, and adding cameras and lights, among other features. As part of his 2007 PlaNYC master plan for New York City, Mayor Michael Bloomberg announced that $64–65 million would be allocated for the project. Ultimately, the renovation received $12 million from the federal government and $50 million from the city.

A path connecting with the Manhattan side of the bridge opened on August 26, 2008; to celebrate the occasion, Bloomberg led a rare public walk across the High Bridge. Preliminary planning for the restoration, funded by PlaNYC, began the next year. The city awarded a design contract to Lichtenstein Consulting Engineers and Chu & Gassman Consulting Engineers, and it began soliciting ideas for the renovation from the public in 2010. The consultants proposed adding high fences to the bridge's walkway, prompting objections that they would ruin views from the bridge. Objections notwithstanding, the New York City Landmarks Preservation Commission approved the renovation plans in April 2011. The renovation plans coincided with increased development at the Bronx end.

==== Renovation and reopening ====
A ceremonial groundbreaking for the project took place on January 13, 2013, at which point the project was to cost $61 million and take a year. (Note: The cost is sometimes cited as $62 million.) At the time, Bloomberg was considering constructing a greenway on Manhattan's periphery, connecting with the High Bridge. A NYC Parks official described the bridge as "the centerpiece of the Harlem River corridor". The project involved adding fences and replacing the deck's brickwork, in addition to masonry and steel restoration, new lights, and new ramps. By 2014, the cost of renovation had increased to $62 million. The opening was first postponed to late 2014 due to inclement weather, and the project's scope of work was expanded to cover the gatehouses' restoration. The opening was then postponed to spring 2015; that May, NYC Parks announced that the bridge would reopen shortly.

The bridge reopened on June 9, 2015, with a ceremony attended by parks commissioner Mitchell J. Silver, Manhattan borough president Gale A. Brewer, and Bronx borough president Rubén Díaz Jr.. It was the only pedestrian-exclusive bridge linking Manhattan to the continental United States and, initially, was closed at night and during the winter. The High Bridge's walkway and arches were illuminated at night following its restoration, and a festival to commemorate the reopening was hosted that July. Nearly a decade after the High Bridge's reopening, a writer for the Bronx Times said that the bridge sometimes "functioned as a promenade on some weekends" and that it had helped connect the neighboring communities in Manhattan and the Bronx.

== Related structures ==
Originally, there were gatehouses at both ends of the High Bridge. These gatehouses, also known as gate chambers, could stop or start the flow of water in the pipes. The gatehouse at the Manhattan end is made of pink Quincy granite, with wood finishes inside. The Manhattan gatehouse stood on the eastern shore of a seven-acre (2.8 ha) reservoir, Highbridge Reservoir, within what is now Highbridge Park. The reservoir had a total capacity of 10,794,000 US gallons (40,860,000 L) and was surrounded by an embankment. There was another gatehouse at the reservoir's western shore, similar in design to the High Bridge gatehouses. Highbridge Reservoir was infilled in 1934 to make way for the Highbridge Play Center.

The High Bridge Water Tower pumped water from the High Bridge's tubes into the reservoir. The pumps were powered by three steam engines, which were located in an engine room and boiler house just north of the bridge. The engine room was three stories tall, while the boiler house was one story tall; both were made of stone and Quincy granite. A coal conveyor belt brought coal from a wharf on the Harlem River to a coalhouse near these structures. These pieces of infrastructure were closed or demolished in 1926.

=== High Bridge Water Tower ===
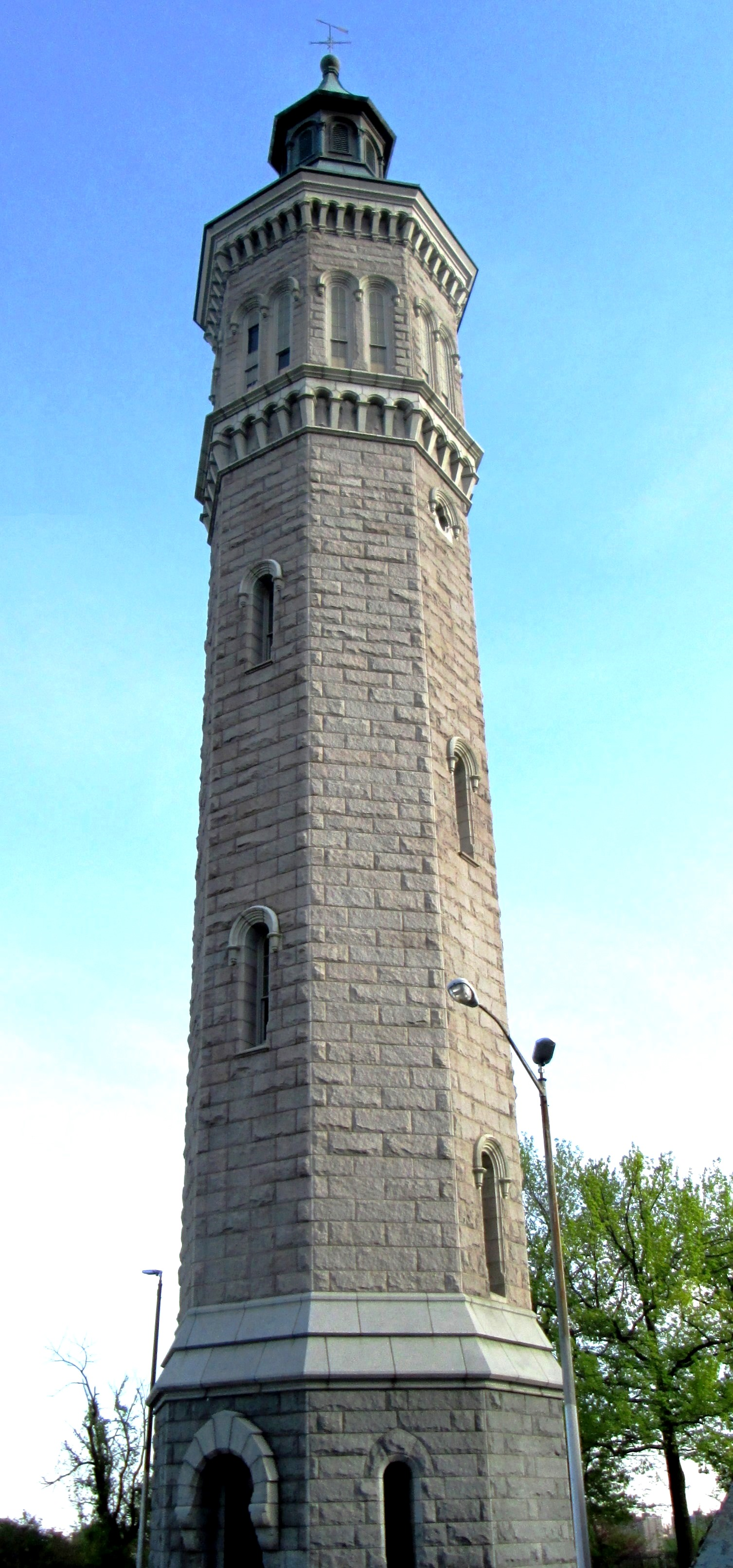
The tower, seen from the north

The High Bridge Water Tower is in Highbridge Park between 173rd and 174th streets, at the bridge's Manhattan end. The 200-foot (61 m) octagonal tower was designed by John B. Jervis and constructed from 1866 to 1872. Water was pumped up 100 feet (30 m) to the Highbridge Reservoir next to the tower, which then provided water to be lifted to the tower's 47,000-US-gallon (180 m^{3}) tank. This "high service" improved the water system's gravity pressure, necessary because of the increased use of flush toilets.

The tower's load-bearing exterior stonework was designed in a mixture of the Romanesque Revival and neo-Grec styles. The interior of the tower features a wide well-detailed iron spiral staircase with six large landings and paired windows. The tower was removed from service in 1949 and avoided demolition in 1951 when NYC Parks offered to operate it. It was burned by arson in 1984 and later restored.

== Impact ==
In Manhattan, the design of the bridge inspired a similar viaduct from the Harlem River Drive to the 178th–179th Street Tunnels, which was demolished in 1950 when the Trans-Manhattan Expressway was built. Highbridge Park on the Manhattan side was named after the bridge. On the Bronx side, the bridge was also the namesake of the Highbridgeville (later Highbridge) neighborhood, which housed many of the laborers who had built the structure. In addition, drawings and schematics of the bridge have been displayed in exhibitions at the Hudson River Museum and the Cooper Union.

=== Reception ===
At the High Bridge's completion, it was described by the New York Evening Post as "one of the hydraulic wonders of the new world", and Mayor Robert H. Morris predicted that the bridge would "endure for ages". In 1854, Gleason's Pictorial Drawing-Room Companion described the bridge as "a magnificent and lofty construction" that enhanced the surrounding landscape. A writer for Scribner's Magazine said in 1899 that the bridge contributed to the Harlem River valley's "spirit of freedom and outdoors and relaxation", and The Home Journal wrote the next year that the crossing "has certain elements of dignity" in its Roman aqueduct–styled design. The Democrat and Chronicle of Rochester, New York, wrote in 1901 that "after seventy years' service [the bridge] does not show a flaw".

When the bridge was planned for renovation in 1927, one writer said that "High Bridge, the Hell Gate Bridge, Brooklyn Bridge, and Washington Bridge are magnets which bring sightseers and money spenders to New York City". Another writer said the original aqueduct "might have delighted the eyes of old Caligula and Claudius themselves", and the New York Herald Tribune called it "one of the most beautiful engineering monuments of its kind" in the U.S.. After the renovation was completed, a writer for The New York Times said the new steel arch represented the future. Conversely, the Daily Sentinel of Rome, New York, wrote that the modifications had "destroyed its architectural beauty", and the historian Christopher Gray retrospectively said the bridge had "suffered a grievous blow". A writer for the Rochester Times-Union described it as a "complete, beautiful and useless structure" in 1940. The Herald Tribune wrote in 1951 that the bridge, along with the Manhattan water tower, were still "favorite subjects for photographers and artists".

David W. Dunlap of The New York Times called the bridge "the earliest of the city's great crossings" in 1985, and a Daily Sentinel reporter said in 1992 that the structure had been "shorn of several of its Romanesque arches" but retained its grace and beauty. Another writer for the Times said in 1999 that the High Bridge and the neighboring Washington and Hamilton bridges gave "an extra dimension of drama" to the adjacent portion of Highbridge Park in Manhattan. The author Stanley Greenberg said the High Bridge was a "recognizable icon" of the Croton Aqueduct in New York City, and Environment magazine called it one of multiple "engineering marvels" that had accompanied the Old Croton Aqueduct's construction.

The restored bridge has been compared with the High Line park in Manhattan, another abandoned elevated structure that was repurposed for public use. A writer for The New York Times wrote in 2015 that, in contrast to the High Line's busyness, the High Bridge was quiet and often did not have any pedestrians passing by for minutes at a time. A writer for the German newspaper Die Welt attributed the bridge's lack of popularity to its distance from Manhattan's tourist attractions, saying: "Close your eyes and be glad that tourists almost never find this place."

=== Landmark designations ===
The New York City Landmarks Preservation Commission (LPC) designated the High Bridge as a city landmark on November 15, 1970, the same year that the water tower was designated a city landmark. The bridge was added to the National Register of Historic Places (NRHP) in 1972; the water tower is also part of this designation. The bridge, along with the rest of the Old Croton Aqueduct in the Bronx and Westchester, is also listed on the NRHP as a National Historic Landmark (NHL), having been granted NHL designation in 1992. Though the aqueduct had previously been added to the NRHP in 1974, the prior designation did not cover the High Bridge or the Bronx portion of the aqueduct. In addition, the bridge is part of a National Historic Civil Engineering Landmark designation granted to the Croton Aqueduct in 1975, and it was added to the New York State Register of Historic Places in 1980.

== Gallery ==
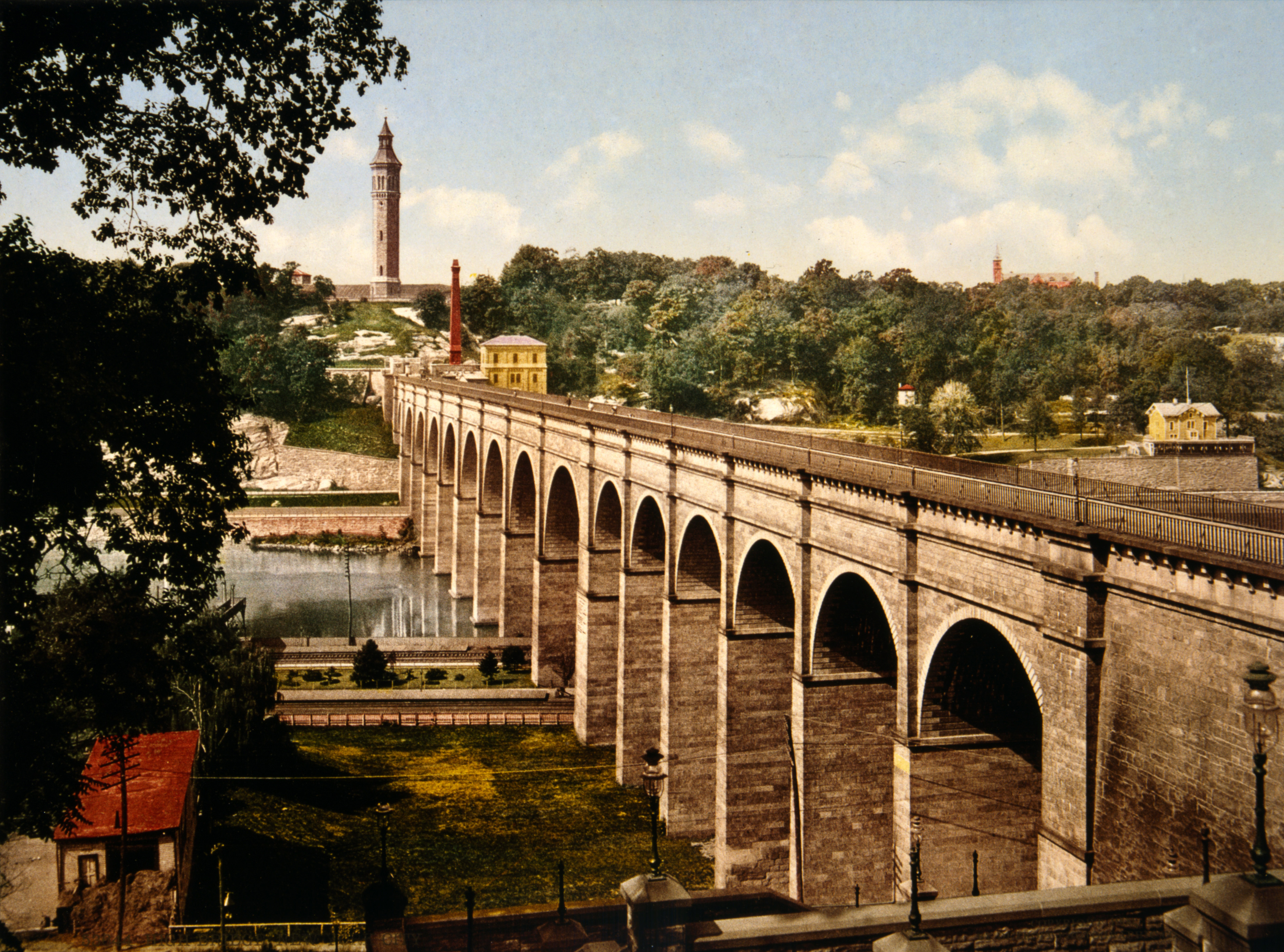
A print from 1900, showing original stone arches

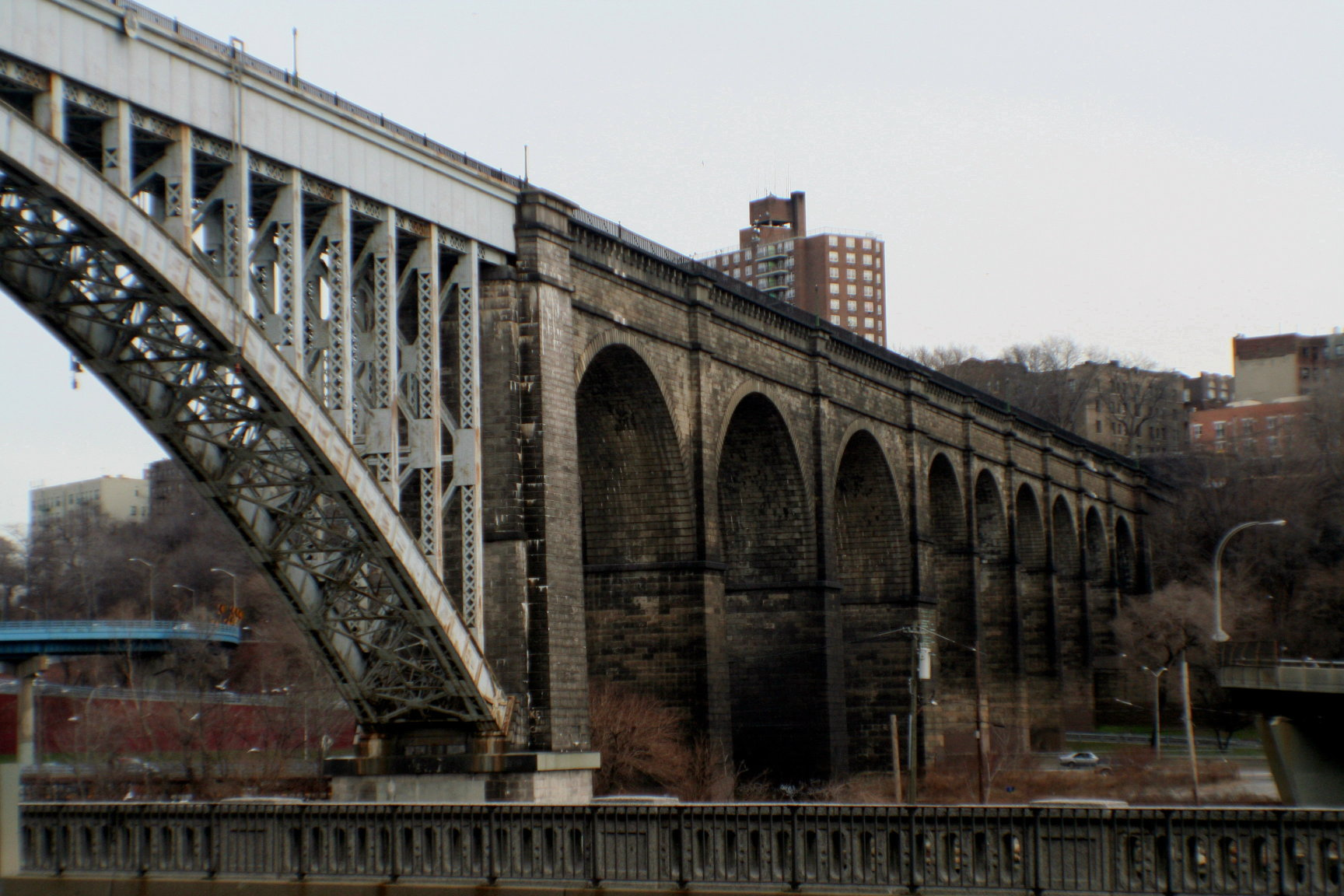
The transition from the steel arch over the Harlem River to the stone arches over the Major Deegan Expressway

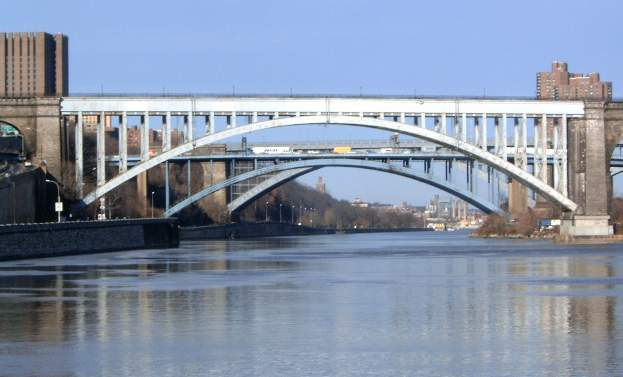
Three Harlem River bridges: High Bridge nearest; Alexander Hamilton Bridge; and Washington Bridge, farthest. Washington Heights on left; the Bronx on right

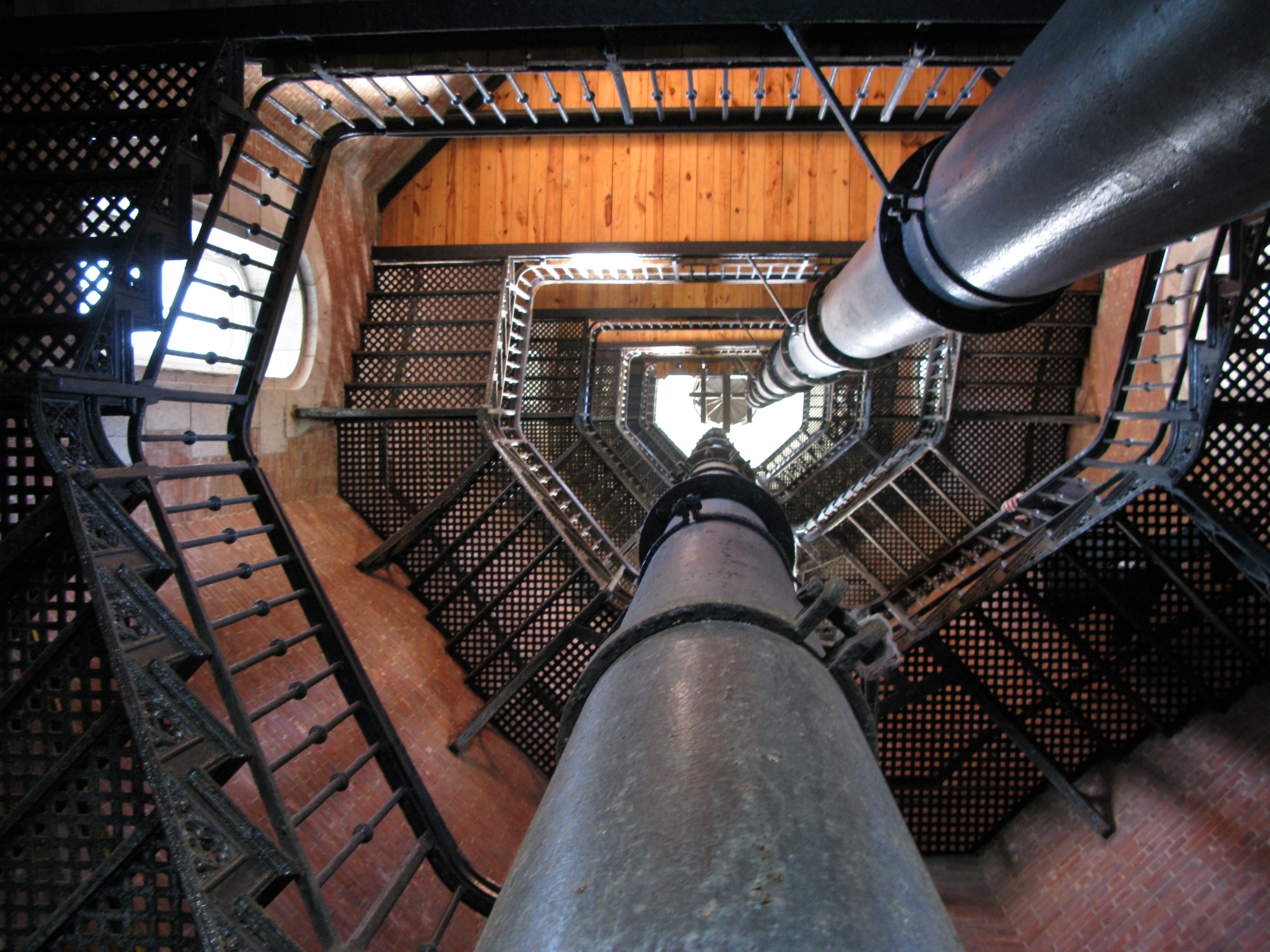
Interior staircase of the High Bridge Water Tower
Walkway plaques

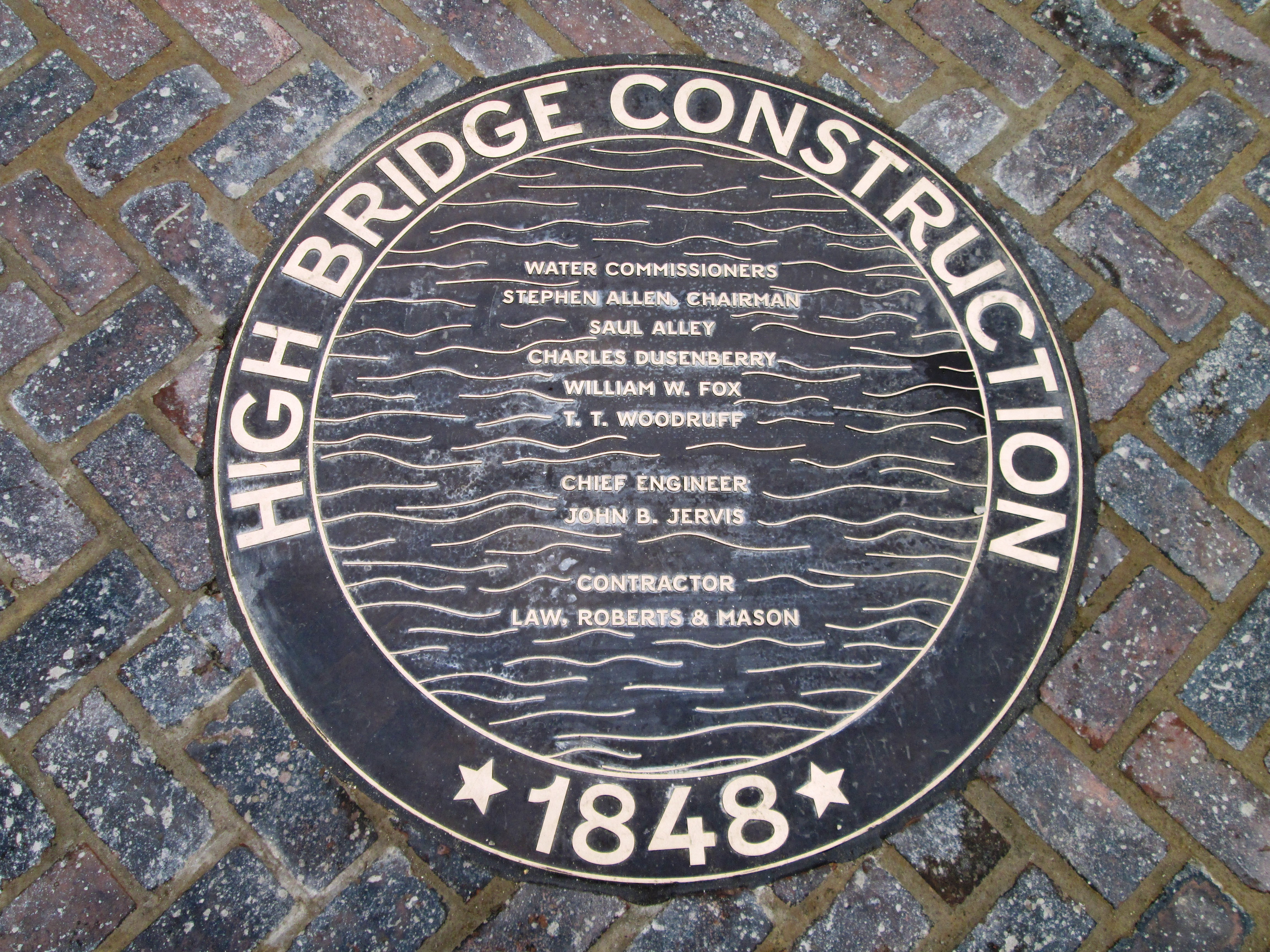
High Bridge Construction (1848)

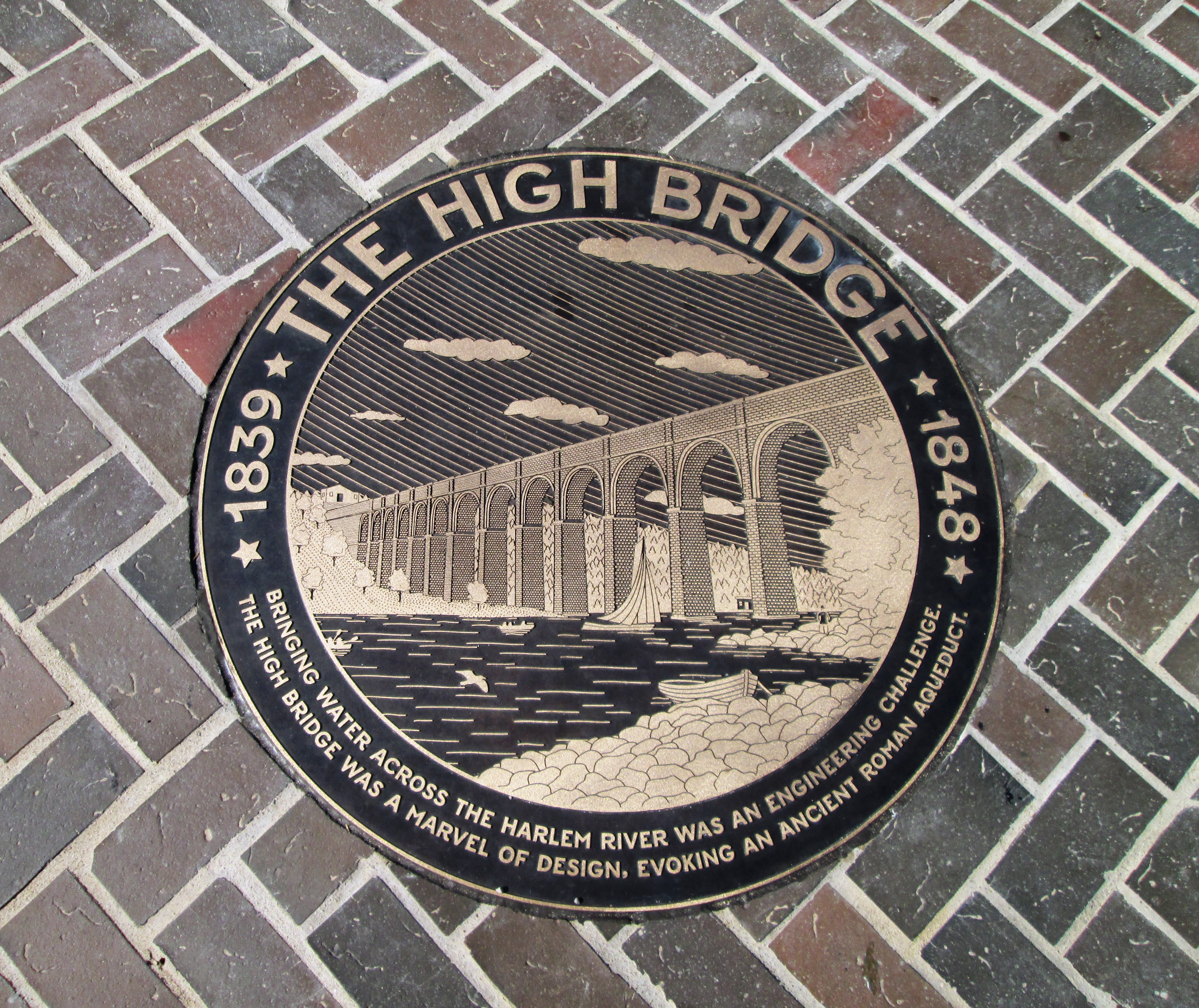
The High Bridge (1839–1848)

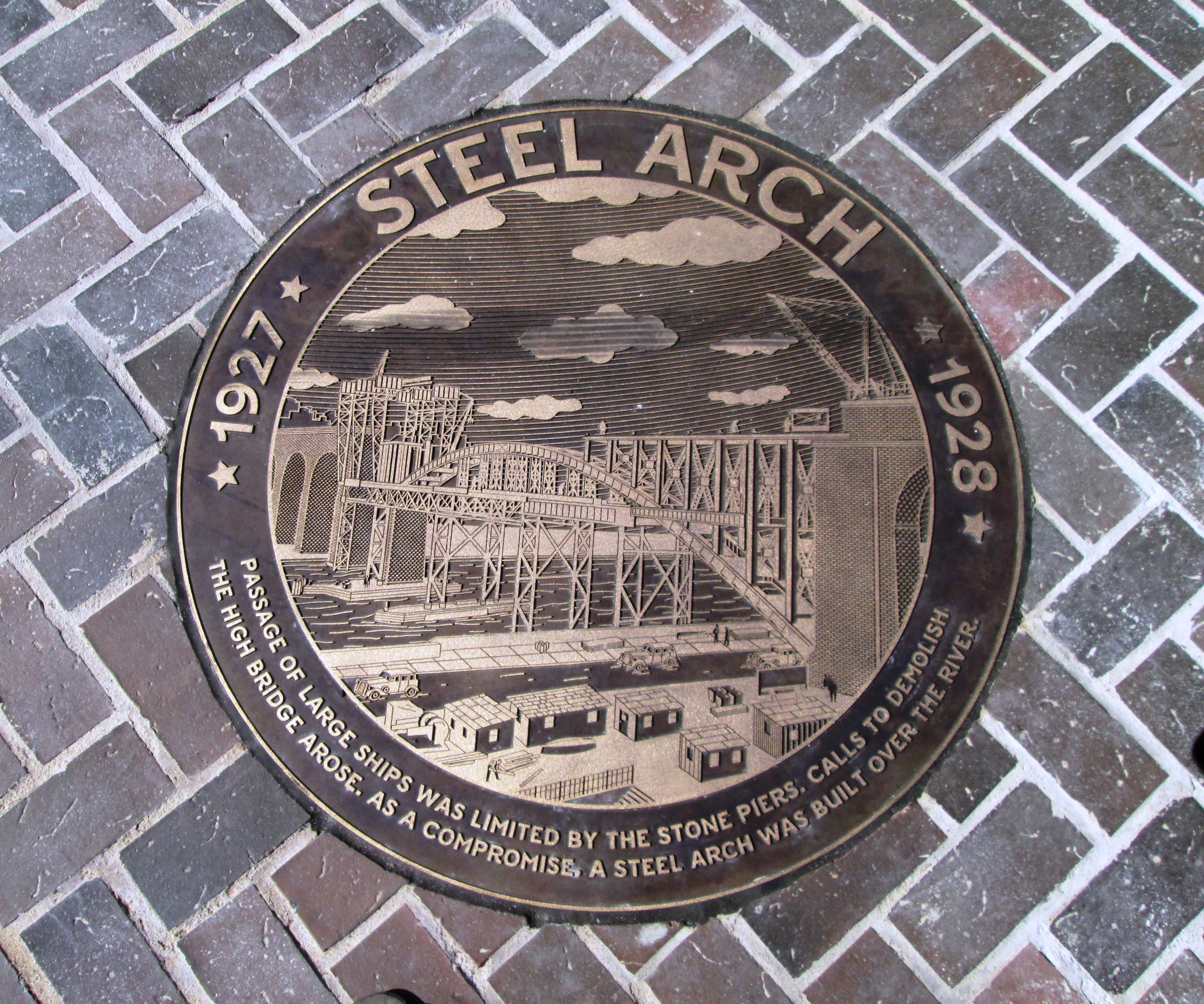
Steel Arch (1927–1928)

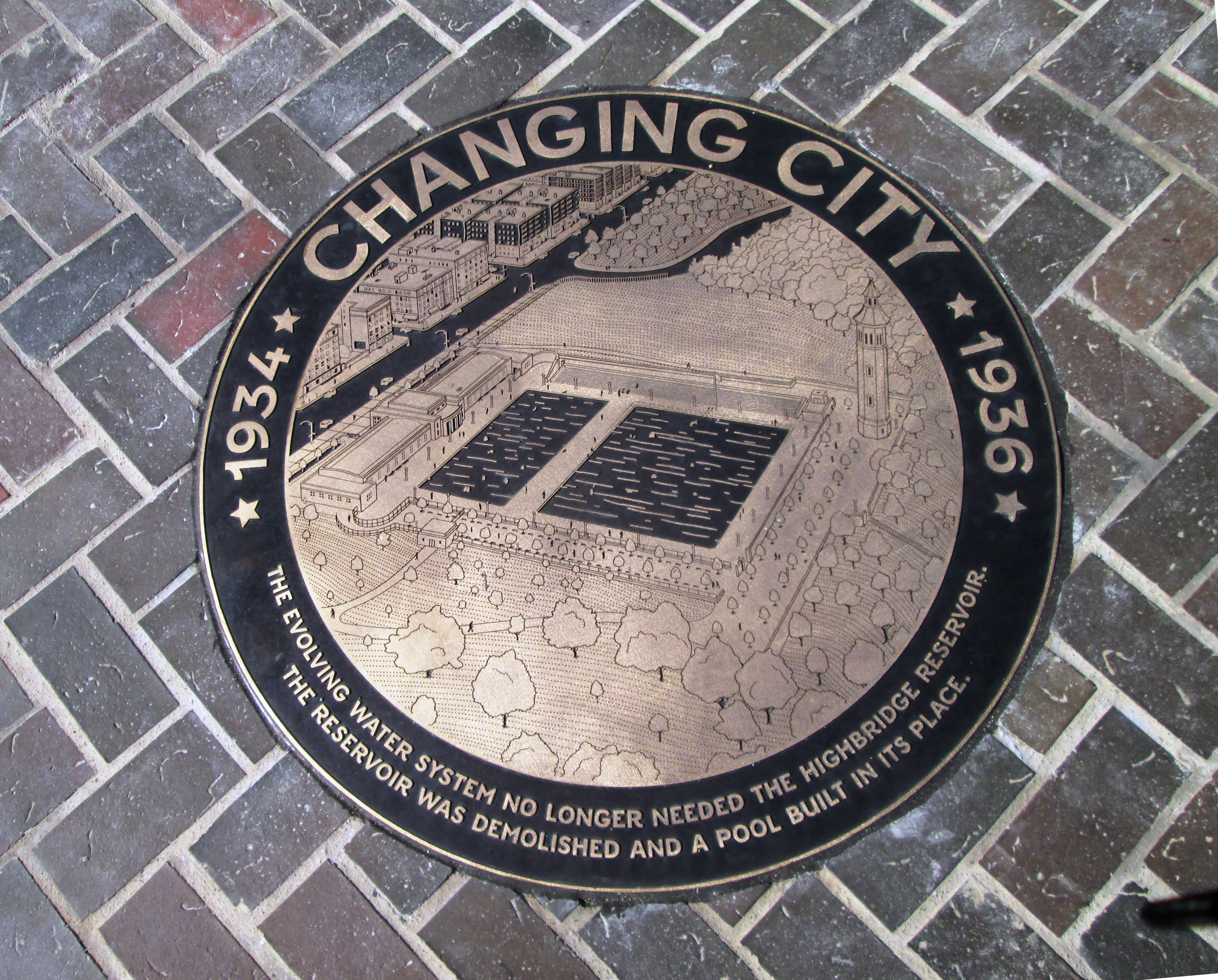
Changing City (1934–1936)

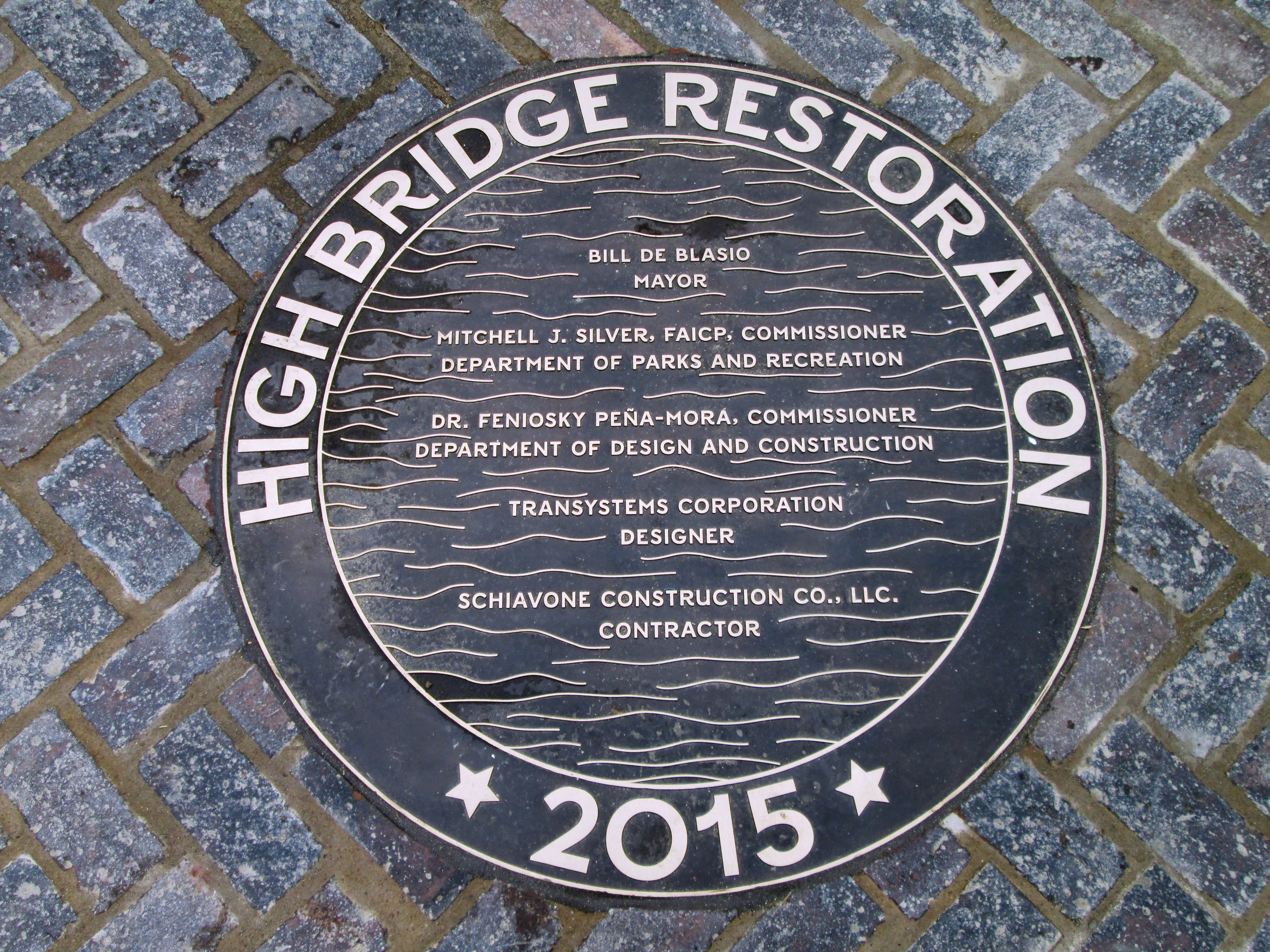
High Bridge Restoration (2015)

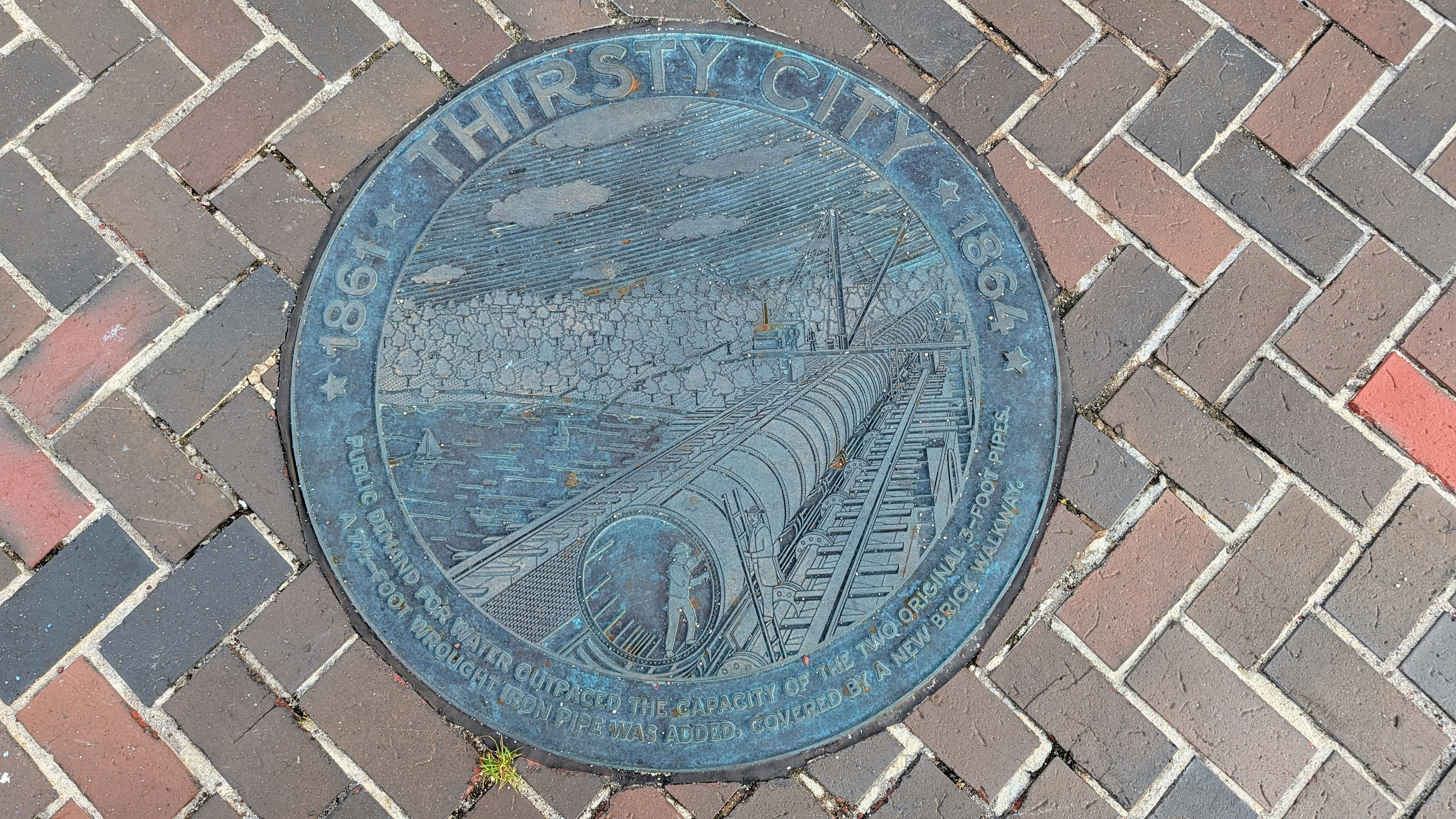
Thirsty City (1861–1864)

== See also ==
- List of crossings of the Harlem River
- List of bridges documented by the Historic American Engineering Record in New York (state)
- List of bridges on the National Register of Historic Places in New York
- List of National Historic Landmarks in New York City
- List of New York City Designated Landmarks in Manhattan above 110th Street
- List of New York City Designated Landmarks in the Bronx
- National Register of Historic Places listings in Manhattan above 110th Street
- National Register of Historic Places listings in the Bronx
