= Highbridge Reservoir =

Reservoir in Manhattan, New York (1872–1934)

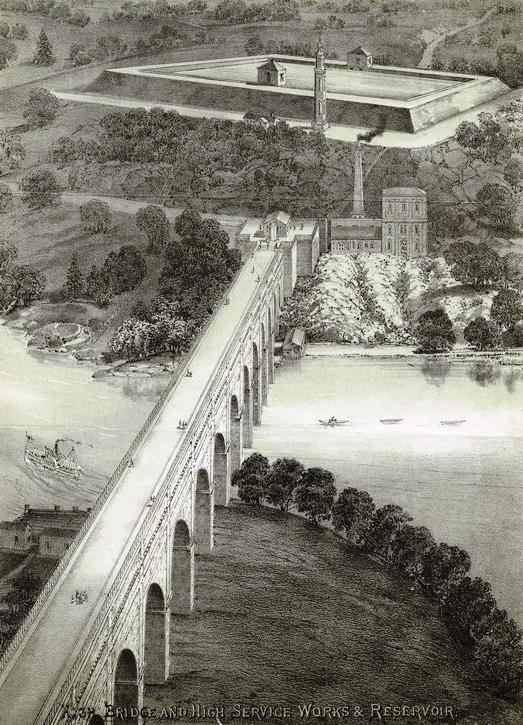
- An overview from 1871 showing the High Bridge, the High Bridge Water Tower and the Highbridge Reservoir

- Location within New York City Location within New York
- Interactive map of Highbridge Reservoir
- Location: Amsterdam Avenue; Upper Manhattan, New York
- Coordinates: 40°50′33″N 73°56′01″W
- Type: Reservoir
- Etymology: High Bridge
- Primary inflows: Croton Aqueduct
- Basin countries: United States
- Built: 1866
- Construction engineer: John B. Jervis
- First flooded: 1872
- Surface area: 7 acres (28,000 m^{2})
- Max. depth: 16 feet (4.9 m)
- Water volume: 10,794,000 US gal (40,860,000 L)
- Surface elevation: 336 feet (102 m)
- Settlements: Washington Heights, Manhattan

Highbridge Reservoir was a reservoir in the New York City water supply system, which received water from a portion of the Croton Aqueduct system. It was located on Amsterdam Avenue between 172nd Street and 174th Street, in Upper Manhattan adjacent to the High Bridge Water Tower and the High Bridge across the Harlem River Valley. The reservoir covered about 7 acres (28,000 m^{2}), was 16 feet (4.9 m) deep, and had a total capacity of 10,794,000 US gallons (40,860,000 L).

== History ==
In 1863, the New York Legislature authorized construction of the reservoir and water tower to supply water pressure to buildings located at high elevations in the surrounding area. The project was designed by John B. Jervis, the chief engineer of the Croton Aqueduct. Construction began in 1866 and was completed in 1872. Steam engines pumped water up from the aqueduct approximately 100 feet (30 m) into the reservoir and then pumped it another 200 feet (61 m) to the top of the water tower into a tank with a capacity of 47,000 US gallons (180,000 L).

By 1934, the reservoir had not been used for fifteen years and was proposed by New York State Office of Parks, Recreation and Historic Preservation Commissioner, Robert Moses, as the site of a new park. In the spring of 1934, Highbridge Reservoir was taken over by the Office of Parks for the construction of the Highbridge Play Center of Highbridge Park, including an outdoor swimming pool.
