= Henry Farnam =

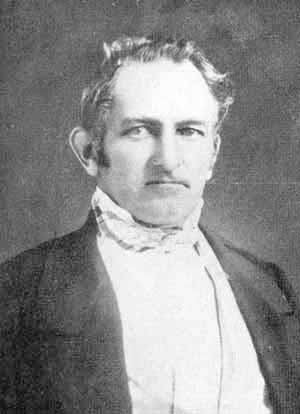
- Born: November 9, 1803; Scipio, New York
- Died: October 4, 1883 (aged 79); New Haven, Connecticut
- Occupations: civil engineer, railroad president

Henry Farnam (November 9, 1803 – October 4, 1883) was an American philanthropist and railroad president.

== Biography ==
He was born in Scipio, New York, and grew up working on his father's farm. By his teenage years, he had begun studying mathematics on his own and in 1820 he gained employment initially as a camp cook on the Erie Canal. Under the wing of Benjamin Wright, America's most famous civil engineer at the time and a man who encouraged many young men to study civil engineering, Farnam learned surveying and was soon employed as a surveyor on the Erie Canal. In 1825 he began working for the New Haven and Northampton Canal, becoming construction superintendent in 1827.

He moved to New Haven, Connecticut, in 1839 and was instrumental in building the railroad that replaced the canal there in 1848.

In 1850 he moved to Illinois where he partnered with Joseph E. Sheffield to build the Chicago, Rock Island and Pacific Railroad. In 1854 he became that railroad's president, an office he held until his retirement in 1863.

In 1868 he moved back to New Haven where he remained until his death in 1883. His son Henry Walcott Farnam was an economist, and served as president of the American Economic Association in 1911.

Business positions
Preceded by John B. Jervis	President of Chicago, Rock Island and Pacific Railroad; 1854 – 1863	Succeeded by Charles W. Durant
