= James Grant (Iowa politician) =

American judge and politician

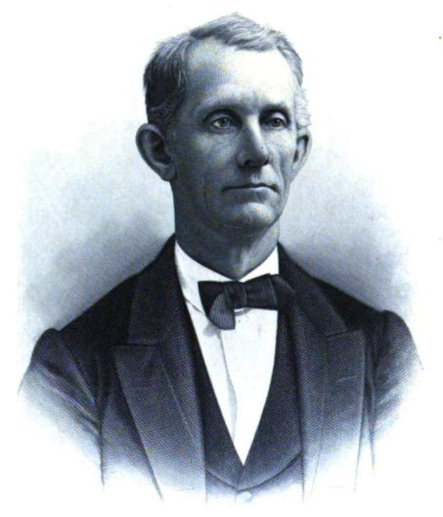

State Attorney
- In office 1834–1840
- Constituency: Illinois

Personal details
- Born: December 12, 1812 North Carolina, U.S.
- Died: March 14, 1891 (aged 78) Oakland, California, U.S.
- Party: Democratic
- Occupation: Politician, lawyer

James Grant (December 12, 1812 – March 14, 1891) was an American lawyer, statesman, and business leader in Davenport, Iowa.

James was born on his family's plantation near Enfield in Halifax County, North Carolina, on December 12, 1812. He attended the University at Chapel Hill (now known as University of North Carolina) and graduated in 1831, before his eighteenth (18) birthday. While at UNC, he was a member of the Dialectic and Philanthropic Societies. He read law and moved west.

Settling first in Chicago, Grant served as a state's attorney for Illinois from 1834 to 1837. Then, in 1840, he moved to the Iowa Territory and opened his law practice. A lifelong Democrat, he served in the Territorial Assembly as a representative for Scott County in 1842 and 1843. As statehood approached and was granted, he attended the Iowa Constitutional Conventions in 1844 and 1846.

His legal practice was very successful, and he made a small fortune representing the railroads. After statehood, he served for several years as judge in the Iowa District Court, but resigned when this created a conflict of interest with his representation of railway lines. In 1851, he invested in and became the first president of the Chicago and Rock Island Railroad.

The definition and rules for a conflict of interest differed in the nineteenth century. His role in the rail industry didn't prevent him from running for the State House of Representatives. He served one term there, from 1852 to 1853, was elected Speaker of the House, and was able to secure valuable franchises and right-of-way concessions for the railroad. He also served for a while as mayor of Davenport.

Grant left the railroad and returned to his private legal practice for several years. Around 1880 he retired and moved to California for the climate. He died on March 14, 1891, in Oakland, California. His remains were shipped back to Davenport for his funeral, and he is buried in the Oakdale Cemetery there.

== See also ==
- List of railroad executives

New title	President of Chicago and Rock Island Railroad; 1850 – 1851	Succeeded by John B. Jervis
