= John B. Jervis =

American civil engineer (1795–1885)

John Bloomfield Jervis
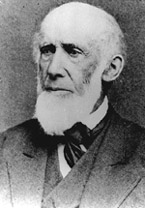
- Born: December 14, 1795; Huntington, New York, U.S.
- Died: January 12, 1885 (aged 89); Rome, New York, U.S.
- Title: President of Chicago and Rock Island Railroad
- Term: 1851-1854
- Predecessor: James W. Grant
- Successor: Henry Farnam

John Bloomfield Jervis (December 14, 1795 – January 12, 1885) was an American civil engineer. America's leading consulting engineer of the antebellum era (1820–60), Jervis designed and supervised the construction of five of America's earliest railroads, was chief engineer of three major canal projects, designed the famous, pioneering, DeWitt Clinton steam locomotive in 1831 while with the Mohawk & Hudson RR, designed the first locomotive with a swiveling 4-wheeled front bogie truck in 1832 for the M&H RR, designed and built the 41-mile Croton Aqueduct – New York City's fresh water supply from 1842 to 1891 – and was a consulting engineer for the Boston water system.

== Biography ==
John Bloomfield Jervis was born in 1795 at Huntington, New York, on Long Island, the son of Timothy Jervis, a carpenter, and Phoebe Bloomfield, the eldest of seven children. Jervis moved with his family to Fort Stanwix (later known as Rome) in upstate New York in 1798 when his father purchased a farm and ran a lumber business. In October 1817 at the age of 22, Jervis was hired by Chief Engineer Benjamin Wright of the Erie Canal as an axeman in a survey party to locate the canal west of Rome, New York. The role of the axemen was to clear away brush and trees along a "trace" four feet wide.(Ibid.) In the spring of 1818, Jervis became a rodman until the canal was located from Rome to Montezuma on July 10, 1818. (Ibid.) By the end of 1818, Jervis was promoted to resident engineer in charge of a canal section seventeen miles long and promoted to General Superintendent of the Eastern Division in 1824.

Jervis left the Erie Canal in early 1825 to again work with Benjamin Wright on the Delaware and Hudson Canal Company. In 1827, Jervis became the chief engineer for the Delaware and Hudson. In this position, he convinced the board of directors to test locomotives for the gravity railroad feeding coal to the canal terminal. Among the four engines imported for the experiment was the famous Stourbridge Lion, and the less-known "America", lighter locomotive which was delivered 5 months before the Stourbridge Lion and which was demonstrated for the public the day before the Lion. Both locomotives were ordered from Robert the Robert Stephenson & Co., the Lion being built by Foster, Rastrick and Company of England and becoming the second commercial locomotive to run in the Western Hemisphere.

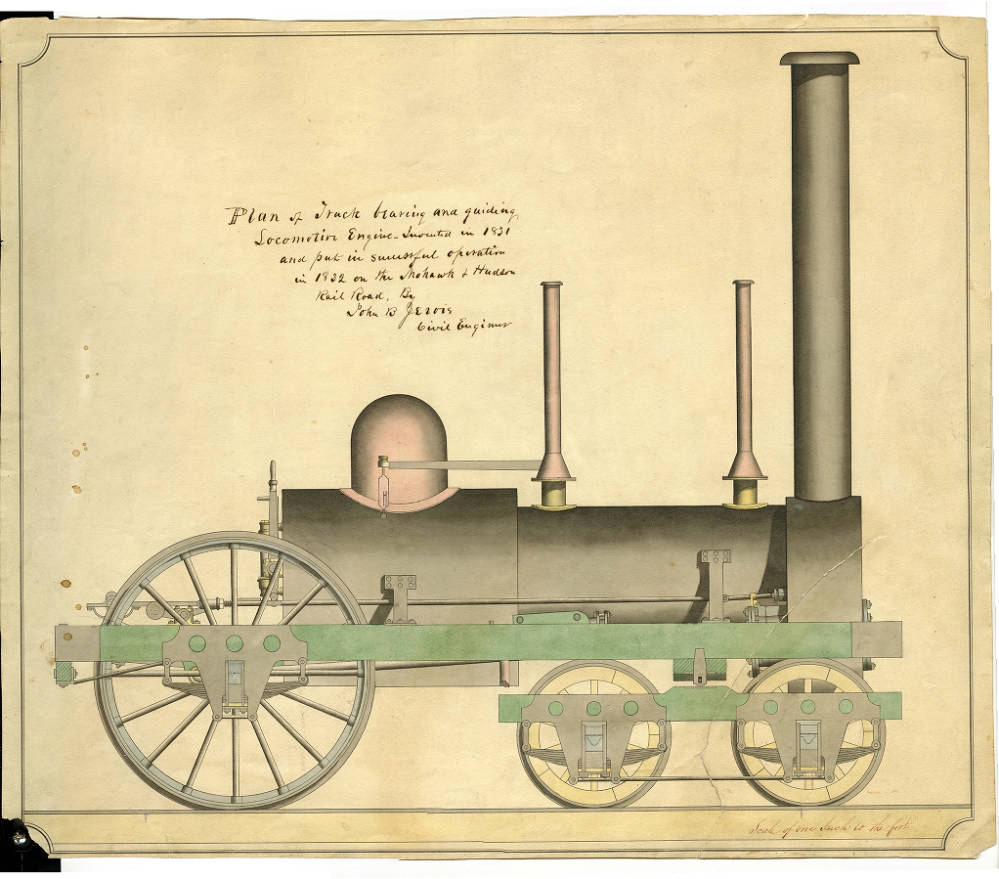
Jervis's steam locomotive, Experiment, was the first locomotive with a truck, which guides the locomotive into curves while also supporting the smokebox

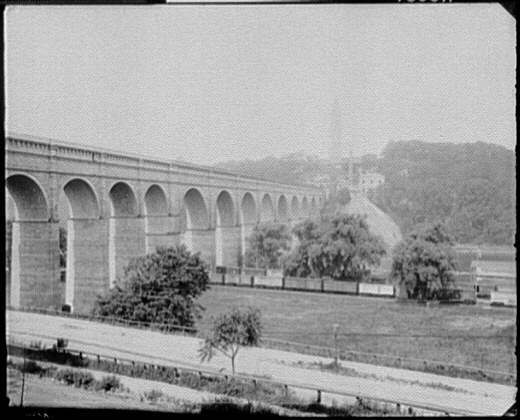
The High Bridge over the Harlem River, part of the Croton Aqueduct, in 1890

In 1831, he became the chief engineer for the Mohawk and Hudson Railroad, a predecessor of the New York Central, and two years later he was appointed chief engineer of upstate New York's Chenango Canal project and helped in its design and construction. In 1836, Jervis was chosen as the chief engineer on the 41-mile long Croton Aqueduct. After his work on the aqueduct, Jervis served as a consulting engineer for the Boston water system from 1846 to 1848.

In the 1850s and into the early 1860s he worked on railroads in the midwestern United States, serving as chief engineer for both the Michigan Southern and Northern Indiana Railroad, Chicago and Rock Island Railroad (a predecessor of the Chicago, Rock Island and Pacific Railroad), also serving as President of the latter from 1851 to 1854, and finally the Pittsburgh, Fort Wayne and Chicago Railway.

Jervis retired in 1864 to his homestead in Rome, but he continued to work actively in the area. In 1869, he helped form the Merchants Iron Mill, known today as the Rome Iron Mill in upstate New York. He was also the founder of the Rome public library, named for him. Much of the remainder of Jervis's life was spent writing. He published The Question of Labor and Capital on economics in 1877.

== Work ==
=== Jervis steam locomotive ===
Jervis's first steam locomotive design was the DeWitt Clinton while working as chief engineer for the Mohawk and Hudson Railroad in 1831. The following year he built the Experiment (later renamed the Brother Jonathan), the first steam locomotive with a leading bogie, a four-wheel leading truck that guides the locomotive into curves. This 4-2-0 locomotive, which had two powered driving wheels on a rear axle underneath the locomotive's firebox, became known as the Jervis type. The Mohawk & Hudson Rail Road began operating the 4-2-0 in 1832.

=== Croton Aqueduct ===
In 1836, Jervis was chosen as the chief engineer on the 41-mile Croton Aqueduct, which operated from 1842 to 1865, bringing fresh water to New York City.

Many of Jervis's original diagrams for this project are now preserved at both the Smithsonian Institution and the Library of Congress in Washington, D.C. The High Bridge which still stands across the Harlem River in New York City, connecting Manhattan and the Bronx, was part of this project.

== Legacy ==
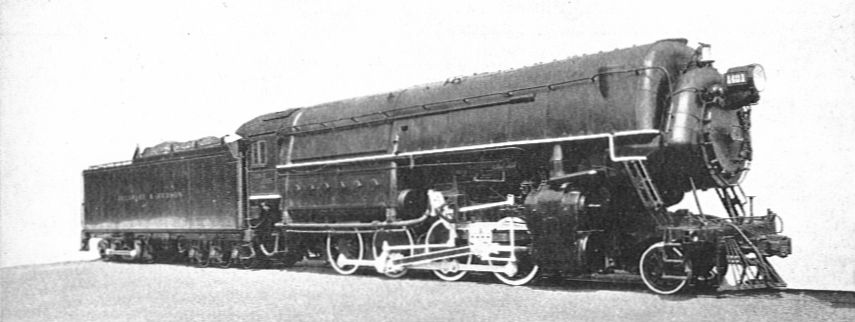
1401 John B. Jervis

Upon his death, Jervis bequeathed his homestead to the city of Rome to use as the location for a public library. His personal library now forms the John B. Jervis collection of the Jervis Public Library. The building was listed on the National Register of Historic Places in 1982. In 1927, the Delaware and Hudson Railroad built an experimental steam locomotive that was designed to run at 400 psi (2.8 MPa or 28 kgf/cm^{2}) steam pressure; this locomotive, road number 1401, was named John B. Jervis.

The city of Port Jervis, New York, is also named in his honor. The city was a port on the former Delaware and Hudson Canal, which he designed, and is located at the adjoining borders of New York, New Jersey, and Pennsylvania.

== Works ==
- Railway Property (1859)
- The Construction and Management of Railways (1861)
- Labor and Capital (1877)

Preceded by James W. Grant	President of Chicago and Rock Island Railroad; 1851 – 1854	Succeeded by Henry Farnam
