= William James Bennett =

British artist (1787–1844)

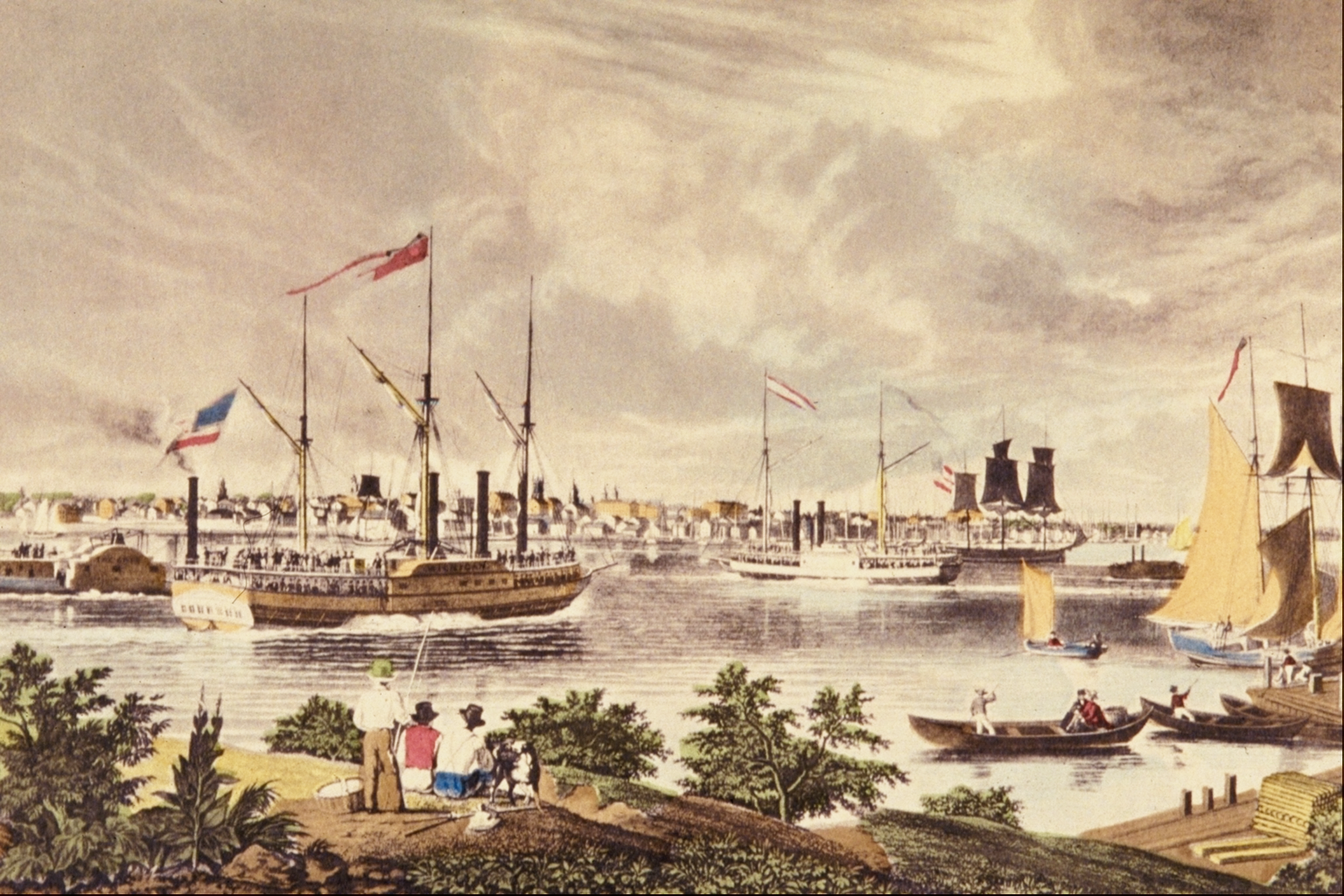
City of Detroit, Michigan. Taken from the Canada Shore near the Ferry, after a sketch by Frederick Grain, published by Henry J. Megarey, New York, 1837.

William James Bennett (1787−1844), was a British-born painter and engraver, active in the United States from 1816. He was a founder member of the "Associated Artists in Watercolour" in 1808. and twelve years later was elected an Associate of the Water-Colour Society.

== Life ==
Bennett was born in London in 1787, and studied at the Royal Academy Schools. He was a pupil of Westall, and developed an interest in landscape painting. At the age of eighteen he obtained an appointment connected with the medical staff of the army, and was sent with the military to Egypt in 1805. He sketched views in Egypt and, on his return journey to Britain, in Malta. Still attached to the military hospital, he was sent to the Mediterranean a second time, under Sir James Craig. He visited several parts of Italy in the course of duty, and obtained leave of absence to visit Florence, Naples, and Rome.

He went to the United States around 1826, and became a member of the National Academy of Design at New York in 1828, where he exhibited watercolour landscapes and seascapes, and engravings.

In the 1830s and early 1840s he produced a series of aquatints of topographical views, both from his own paintings and those of others. They were issued as individual prints. He painted a series of four pictures of Niagara Falls, which were published as large aquatints, two of which he etched himself.

Bennett died in New York in 1844. He was interred at Green-Wood Cemetery in Brooklyn.
