= List of Paramount Pictures films (1930–1939) =

The following is a list of films originally produced and/or distributed theatrically by Paramount Pictures and released in the 1930s. All films under copyright (with a few exceptions) are currently owned by Universal Television through EMKA, Ltd.

== 1930 ==
Release date	Title	Notes	Video if in the public domain
January 4, 1930	Applause	Inducted into the National Film Registry in 2006	
January 11, 1930	The Kibitzer		
January 18, 1930	The Love Parade	Academy Award nominee for Best Picture.	
January 18, 1930	Behind the Make-Up		
January 25, 1930	Seven Days' Leave		
February 1, 1930	Burning Up		
February 8, 1930	Street of Chance		
February 13, 1930	Dangerous Paradise		
February 17, 1930	The Vagabond King	Paramount's first 100% all-Technicolor (two-color process) all-talking picture.	
February 22, 1930	Slightly Scarlet		
February 23, 1930	Roadhouse Nights		
March 8, 1930	Only the Brave		
March 14, 1930	Sarah and Son		
March 21, 1930	Young Eagles		
March 22, 1930	Men Are Like That		
March 29, 1930	Honey		
April 13, 1930	The Benson Murder Case		
April 19, 1930	The Light of Western Stars	Reissue title: Winning the West.	
April 22, 1930	Paramount on Parade	Two-color Technicolor sequences.	
May 2, 1930	The Return of Dr. Fu Manchu		
May 3, 1930	The Big Pond		
May 9, 1930	The Devil's Holiday		
May 10, 1930	The Texan		
May 15, 1930	Ladies Love Brutes		
May 17, 1930	Young Man of Manhattan		
May 25, 1930	True to the Navy		
May 30, 1930	Safety in Numbers		
June 6, 1930	Shadow of the Law		
June 21, 1930	The Social Lion		
June 22, 1930	Dangerous Nan McGrew		
June 28, 1930	With Byrd at the South Pole	Music and narrator	
June 28, 1930	The Border Legion		
July 10, 1930	Anybody's War		
July 12, 1930	A Man from Wyoming		
July 19, 1930	Love Among the Millionaires		
July 19, 1930	For the Defense		
July 23, 1930	Manslaughter		
July 26, 1930	The Sap from Syracuse		
August 1, 1930	Grumpy		
August 2, 1930	The Silent Enemy	Talking sequence, music score and sound effects	
August 15, 1930	Anybody's Woman		
August 16, 1930	Let's Go Native		
August 23, 1930	Queen High		
August 27, 1930	Monte Carlo		
September 6, 1930	Animal Crackers		
September 13, 1930	The Sea God		
September 20, 1930	The Spoilers		
September 25, 1930	Laughter		
September 27, 1930	The Santa Fe Trail		
September 27, 1930	Follow Thru	Filmed in two-color Technicolor.	
September 28, 1930	Her Wedding Night		
October 11, 1930	Heads Up		
October 18, 1930	Playboy of Paris		
November 1, 1930	The Virtuous Sin		
November 8, 1930	Fast and Loose		
November 8, 1930	Feet First (Note: Owned by the estate of Harold Lloyd, with distribution rights currently licensed to Janus Films and The Criterion Collection)	Distribution only, produced by Harold Lloyd Corporation.	
November 19, 1930	Tom Sawyer	Based on The Adventures of Tom Sawyer by Mark Twain.	
November 23, 1930	Derelict		
December 1, 1930	Sea Legs		
December 6, 1930	Only Saps Work		
December 6, 1930	Morocco	Adapted from the novel Amy Jolly by Benno Vigny Inducted into the National Film Registry in 1992	
December 6, 1930	Follow the Leader		
December 20, 1930	Along Came Youth	Suggested by the novel Molinoff by Maurice Bedel.	
December 22, 1930	The Royal Family of Broadway		
December 27, 1930	The Right to Love		

== 1931 ==
Release date	Title	Notes
January 3, 1931	The Blue Angel	A Paramount-Ufa co-production; English-language version
January 16, 1931	No Limit	
January 17, 1931	The Gang Buster	
January 31, 1931	Scandal Sheet	
February 1, 1931	Fighting Caravans	Reissue title: Blazing Arrows. Remade as Wagon Wheels (1934).
February 19, 1931	It Pays to Advertise	
February 21, 1931	Stolen Heaven	
February 28, 1931	Finn and Hattie	
March 1, 1931	The Conquering Horde	
March 7, 1931	Rango	
March 14, 1931	Unfaithful	
March 21, 1931	Honor Among Lovers	
March 21, 1931	June Moon	
March 28, 1931	Man of the World	
April 4, 1931	Dishonored	
April 11, 1931	Gun Smoke	
April 18, 1931	City Streets	
April 25, 1931	Skippy	Academy Award nominee for Best Picture. Based on the comic strip Skippy by Percy Crosby. Followed by Sooky, released in December.
May 2, 1931	Tarnished Lady	
May 9, 1931	Ladies' Man	
May 16, 1931	Dude Ranch	
May 20, 1931	Up Pops the Devil	
May 24, 1931	Kick In	
May 30, 1931	The Vice Squad	
June 6, 1931	The Lawyer's Secret	
June 27, 1931	I Take This Woman	
June 27, 1931	The Girl Habit	
July 4, 1931	Women Love Once	
July 5, 1931	Forbidden Adventure	
July 8, 1931	The House That Shadows Built	Promotional film
July 11, 1931	Confessions of a Co-Ed	
July 18, 1931	The Night Angel	
July 21, 1931	Murder by the Clock	
July 25, 1931	The Magnificent Lie	
July 25, 1931	The Secret Call	
July 25, 1931	Honeymoon Lane	
August 1, 1931	The Smiling Lieutenant	Academy Award nominee for Best Picture.
August 1, 1931	Tabu: A Story of the South Seas	Music score and sound effects Inducted into the National Film Registry in 1994
August 7, 1931	Huckleberry Finn	Based on The Adventures of Huckleberry Finn by Mark Twain.
August 8, 1931	Caught	
August 7, 1931	Huckleberry Finn	Based on The Adventures of Huckleberry Finn by Mark Twain.
August 22, 1931	An American Tragedy	Based on the novel by Theodore Dreiser.
August 29, 1931	Silence	
September 5, 1931	Secrets of a Secretary	
September 5, 1931	Daughter of the Dragon	
September 12, 1931	Personal Maid	
September 18, 1931	The Mad Parade	
September 19, 1931	Monkey Business	
September 26, 1931	The Road to Reno	
October 3, 1931	My Sin	
October 10, 1931	24 Hours	
October 24, 1931	The Beloved Bachelor	
November 7, 1931	Once a Lady	
November 7, 1931	Girls About Town	
November 14, 1931	Rich Man's Folly	
November 15, 1931	Touchdown	
November 21, 1931	His Woman	
November 28, 1931	The Cheat	
December 5, 1931	The False Madonna	
December 12, 1931	Working Girls	
December 19, 1931	Husband's Holiday	
December 26, 1931	Ladies of the Big House	
December 27, 1931	Sooky	Sequel to Skippy (1931).

== 1932 ==
Release date	Title	Notes
January 3, 1932	Dr. Jekyll and Mr. Hyde (Note: Owned by Warner Bros. (via Turner Entertainment Co.))	distribution only; Based on The Strange Case of Dr. Jekyll and Mr. Hyde by Robert Louis Stevenson.
January 9, 1932	This Reckless Age	
January 16, 1932	Two Kinds of Women	
January 24, 1932	Broken Lullaby	
January 30, 1932	No One Man	
February 5, 1932	Tomorrow and Tomorrow	
February 12, 1932	Shanghai Express	Academy Award nominee for Best Picture
February 19, 1932	Wayward	
March 5, 1932	Strangers in Love	
March 11, 1932	Dancers in the Dark	
March 15, 1932	The Wiser Sex	
March 25, 1932	One Hour with You	Academy Award nominee for Best Picture'
March 25, 1932	The Broken Wing	
April 1, 1932	The Miracle Man	
April 8, 1932	This Is the Night	
April 15, 1932	The Misleading Lady	
April 20, 1932	Sky Bride	
April 22, 1932	The World and the Flesh	
May 6, 1932	The Strange Case of Clara Deane	
May 13, 1932	Sinners in the Sun	
May 22, 1932	Forgotten Commandments	
June 10, 1932	Merrily We Go to Hell	
June 17, 1932	Thunder Below	
June 20, 1932	Reserved for Ladies	
June 24, 1932	The Man from Yesterday	
July 1, 1932	Make Me a Star	
July 8, 1932	Million Dollar Legs	
July 15, 1932	Lady and Gent	
July 23, 1932	Madame Racketeer	
July 29, 1932	The Vanishing Frontier	
August 5, 1932	Guilty as Hell	
August 12, 1932	Devil and the Deep	
August 18, 1932	Love Me Tonight	
August 19, 1932	Horse Feathers	
September 9, 1932	70,000 Witnesses	
September 17, 1932	The Night of June 13	
September 23, 1932	Movie Crazy	Distribution only, produced by Harold Lloyd Corporation.
September 23, 1932	Blonde Venus	
September 23, 1932	The Phantom President	
September 30, 1932	Heritage of the Desert	Reissue title: When the West Was Young.
October 14, 1932	The Big Broadcast	
October 28, 1932	Hot Saturday	
October 30, 1932	Trouble in Paradise	Inducted into the National Film Registry in 1991
October 30, 1932	Night After Night	
November 4, 1932	He Learned About Women	
November 4, 1932	Madison Square Garden	
November 12, 1932	Evenings for Sale	
November 25, 1932	Wild Horse Mesa	
December 2, 1932	Under-Cover Man	
December 2, 1932	If I Had a Million	
December 8, 1932	A Farewell to Arms (Note: Owned by Warner Bros.)	distribution only; Academy Award nominee for Best Picture. Based on the novel by Ernest Hemingway
December 9, 1932	The Devil Is Driving	
December 30, 1932	Madame Butterfly	
December 30, 1932	No Man of Her Own	
December 1932	Island of Lost Souls	

== 1933 ==
Release date	Title	Notes
January 7, 1933	The Billion Dollar Scandal	
January 20, 1933	The Mysterious Rider	Reissue title: The Fighting Phantom
January 21, 1933	Tonight Is Ours	
February 3, 1933	Luxury Liner	
February 9, 1933	She Done Him Wrong	Academy Award nominee for Best Picture Inducted into the National Film Registry in 1996
February 10, 1933	The Sign of the Cross	
February 17, 1933	The Woman Accused	
February 17, 1933	Hello, Everybody!	
February 18, 1933	Crime of the Century	
February 24, 1933	From Hell to Heaven	
March 1, 1933	The Thundering Herd	Reissue title: Buffalo Stampede.
March 3, 1933	A Lady's Profession	
March 10, 1933	King of the Jungle	
March 17, 1933	Strictly Personal	
March 24, 1933	Pick Up	
March 31, 1933	Murders in the Zoo	
March 31, 1933	M (Note: Owned by Atlantic-Film S.A., with U.S. distribution rights currently licensed to Janus Films and The Criterion Collection)	U.S. distribution only, produced in Germany by Nero-Film A.G.
April 7, 1933	Under the Tonto Rim	
April 14, 1933	Terror Aboard	
April 22, 1933	A Bedtime Story	
April 28, 1933	Song of the Eagle	
May 6, 1933	The Eagle and the Hawk	
May 6, 1933	The Story of Temple Drake (Note: Owned by Disney (via 20th Century Studios))	distribution only
May 12, 1933	Supernatural	
May 26, 1933	Sunset Pass	
May 26, 1933	The Girl in 419	
May 27, 1933	International House	
June 9, 1933	Jennie Gerhardt	
June 23, 1933	Gambling Ship	
July 5, 1933	College Humor	
July 7, 1933	Disgraced!	
July 8, 1933	I Love That Man	
July 14, 1933	Mama Loves Papa	
July 19, 1933	The Song of Songs	
July 21, 1933	Her Bodyguard	
July 29, 1933	Midnight Club	
August 8, 1933	Three-Cornered Moon	
August 25, 1933	Big Executive	
August 25, 1933	Man of the Forest	Reissue title: Challenge of the Frontier.
August 25, 1933	This Day and Age	
September 1, 1933	One Sunday Afternoon	
September 8, 1933	Torch Singer	
September 15, 1933	Too Much Harmony	
September 15, 1933	To the Last Man	Reissue title: Law of Vengeance
September 22, 1933	Golden Harvest	
October 6, 1933	I'm No Angel	
October 13, 1933	Tillie and Gus	
October 20, 1933	The Way to Love	
November 10, 1933	White Woman	
November 17, 1933	Duck Soup	Inducted into the National Film Registry in 1990
November 19, 1933	Cradle Song	
November 24, 1933	Sitting Pretty	
November 25, 1933	Take a Chance	
December 2, 1933	Lone Cowboy	
December 8, 1933	Girl Without a Room	
December 16, 1933	Hell and High Water	
December 22, 1933	Alice in Wonderland	Based on Alice's Adventures in Wonderland and Through the Looking-Glass by Lewis Carroll.
December 29, 1933	Design for Living	

== 1934 ==
Release date	Title	Notes
January 5, 1934	Eight Girls in a Boat	
January 12, 1934	His Double Life	
January 12, 1934	Miss Fane's Baby Is Stolen	
January 26, 1934	Four Frightened People	
February 1, 1934	All of Me	Based on the play Chrysalis by Rose Albert Porter.
February 2, 1934	Search for Beauty	
February 9, 1934	Six of a Kind	
February 23, 1934	Bolero	
March 3, 1934	No More Women	
March 16, 1934	Wharf Angel	
March 17, 1934	Good Dame	
March 23, 1934	Come On Marines!	
March 30, 1934	Death Takes a Holiday	
April 6, 1934	You're Telling Me!	
April 8, 1934	Melody in Spring	
April 14, 1934	The Trumpet Blows	
April 26, 1934	The Witching Hour	
April 27, 1934	We're Not Dressing	
April 27, 1934	She Made Her Bed	
May 1, 1934	The Last Round-Up	
May 4, 1934	Double Door	
May 11, 1934	Private Scandal	
May 18, 1934	Thirty-Day Princess	
May 18, 1934	Murder at the Vanities	
June 1, 1934	Little Miss Marker	Inducted into the National Film Registry in 1998
June 8, 1934	Many Happy Returns	
June 15, 1934	The Great Flirtation	
June 22, 1934	Here Comes the Groom	
July 13, 1934	Kiss and Make-Up	
July 13, 1934	The Old Fashioned Way	
July 18, 1934	Shoot the Works	
July 20, 1934	The Notorious Sophie Lang	Followed by two sequels, The Return of Sophie Lang (1936) and Sophie Lang Goes West (1937).
August 4, 1934	Elmer and Elsie	
August 10, 1934	Ladies Should Listen	
August 30, 1934	Crime Without Passion	
August 31, 1934	She Loves Me Not	
August 31, 1934	Now and Forever	
September 7, 1934	The Scarlet Empress	
September 8, 1934	You Belong to Me	
September 15, 1934	Wagon Wheels	Reissue title: Caravans West. Remake of Fighting Caravans (1931).
September 21, 1934	Belle of the Nineties	
September 28, 1934	The Lemon Drop Kid	
September 28, 1934	The Pursuit of Happiness	
October 5, 1934	Cleopatra	Academy Award nominee for Best Picture
October 28, 1934	Mrs. Wiggs of the Cabbage Patch	
November 22, 1934	Menace	
November 23, 1934	College Rhythm	
November 30, 1934	Ready for Love	
November 30, 1934	It's a Gift	Inducted into the National Film Registry in 2010
December 7, 1934	Behold My Wife!	
December 11, 1934	Limehouse Blues	
December 14, 1934	Father Brown, Detective	Based on "The Blue Cross," by G. K. Chesterton.
December 14, 1934	One Hour Late	
December 28, 1934	Here Is My Heart	

== 1935 ==
Release date	Title	Notes
January 4, 1935	Enter Madame	
January 11, 1935	The President Vanishes	
January 11, 1935	The Lives of a Bengal Lancer	Academy Award nominee for Best Picture
January 25, 1935	The Gilded Lily	
February 1, 1935	Home on the Range	
February 1, 1935	Wings in the Dark	
February 8, 1935	Rumba	
February 22, 1935	All the King's Horses	Based on play by Lawrence Clark and Max Giersberg and by Frederick Herendeen and Edward Horan.
March 1, 1935	Rocky Mountain Mystery	Reissue title: The Fighting Westerner.
March 2, 1935	Car 99	
March 8, 1935	Ruggles of Red Gap	Academy Award nominee for Best Picture Inducted into the National Film Registry in 2014
March 12, 1935	McFadden's Flats	
March 22, 1935	Mississippi	
April 11, 1935	Four Hours to Kill!	
April 19, 1935	Private Worlds	
April 19, 1935	The Devil Is a Woman	
April 20, 1935	Love in Bloom	
April 20, 1935	Stolen Harmony	
April 25, 1935	Goin' to Town	
April 27, 1935	Hold ‘Em Yale	
April 30, 1935	The Scoundrel	
May 10, 1935	Once in a Blue Moon	
May 24, 1935	People Will Talk	
May 28, 1935	Paris in Spring	
June 15, 1935	The Glass Key	
June 21, 1935	College Scandal	
June 29, 1935	Men Without Names	
July 19, 1935	Shanghai	
July 26, 1935	Smart Girl	
August 2, 1935	Every Night at Eight	
August 3, 1935	Man on the Flying Trapeze	
August 9, 1935	This Woman Is Mine	Original British title: 18 Minutes.
August 23, 1935	Hop-a-Long Cassidy	First film in Paramount's Hopalong Cassidy series. Reissued by Screen Guild Productions in 1946 as Hopalong Cassidy Enters.
August 23, 1935	Accent on Youth	
August 23, 1935	Annapolis Farewell	
September 9, 1935	Wanderer of the Wasteland	
September 10, 1935	Here Comes Cookie	
September 12, 1935	Two for Tonight	
September 13, 1935	Without Regret	
September 20, 1935	The Big Broadcast of 1936	
September 27, 1935	The Virginia Judge	
October 4, 1935	Two-Fisted	
October 4, 1935	It's a Great Life	
October 11, 1935	Wings Over Ethiopia	Swiss documentary about the African country Ethiopia. Intended as a travelogue, the film was picked up by Paramount due to the outbreak of the Second Italo-Ethiopian War in October 1935.
October 11, 1935	The Last Outpost	
October 14, 1935	Little America	
October 18, 1935	Hands Across the Table	
October 25, 1935	The Crusades	
October 25, 1935	The Eagle's Brood	The second Hopalong Cassidy film
November 7, 1935	Peter Ibbetson	
November 9, 1935	Ship Cafe	
November 15, 1935	Mary Burns, Fugitive	
November 28, 1935	Coronado	
November 29, 1935	Nevada	
November 30, 1935	Scrooge	Based on A Christmas Carol by Charles Dickens.
December 6, 1935	Bar 20 Rides Again	The third Hopalong Cassidy film
December 12, 1935	Millions in the Air	
December 20, 1935	So Red the Rose	
December 25, 1935	The Bride Comes Home	

== 1936 ==
Release date	Title	Notes
January 10, 1936	Rose of the Rancho	
January 17, 1936	Her Master's Voice	
January 17, 1936	Soak the Rich	
January 22, 1936	Collegiate	
January 24, 1936	Anything Goes	
January 31, 1936	Timothy's Quest	
February 7, 1936	The Milky Way	
February 14, 1936	Drift Fence	Reissue title: Texas Desperadoes.
February 21, 1936	Klondike Annie	
February 28, 1936	Desire	
February 28, 1936	The Preview Murder Mystery	
March 6, 1936	Call of the Prairie	The fourth Hopalong Cassidy film
March 6, 1936	Give Us This Night	
March 6, 1936	Woman Trap	
March 13, 1936	The Trail of the Lonesome Pine	Paramount's first feature filmed in the three-strip Technicolor process and said to be the first Technicolor feature shot on location.
March 20, 1936	Too Many Parents	
March 27, 1936	Desert Gold	Reissue title: Desert Storm.
April 3, 1936	Big Brown Eyes	
April 4, 1936	Till We Meet Again	
April 10, 1936	The Moon's Our Home	
April 14, 1936	Three on the Trail	The fifth Hopalong Cassidy film
April 19, 1936	The Sky Parade	
April 21, 1936	Florida Special	
April 30, 1936	13 Hours by Air	
May 2, 1936	F-Man	
May 8, 1936	The Case Against Mrs. Ames	
May 15, 1936	Fatal Lady	
May 15, 1936	Forgotten Faces	Presumed lost
May 22, 1936	The Princess Comes Across	
May 29, 1936	Border Flight	
June 5, 1936	Early to Bed	
June 5, 1936	Palm Springs	
June 12, 1936	Girl of the Ozarks	
June 16, 1936	And Sudden Death	
June 18, 1936	The Return of Sophie Lang	Sequel to 1934's The Notorious Sophie Lang. Followed by Sophie Lang Goes West in 1937.
June 19, 1936	Poppy	
June 26, 1936	Three Cheers for Love	
June 28, 1936	The Arizona Raiders	Reissue title: Bad Men of Arizona
July 1, 1936	Rhythm on the Range	
July 22, 1936	Spendthrift	
July 24, 1936	Heart of the West	The sixth Hopalong Cassidy film
July 24, 1936	Yours for the Asking	
July 31, 1936	A Son Comes Home	
August 7, 1936	My American Wife	
August 14, 1936	I'd Give My Life	
August 21, 1936	Hollywood Boulevard	
August 28, 1936	Straight from the Shoulder	
August 28, 1936	The Texas Rangers	
September 2, 1936	The General Died at Dawn	
September 4, 1936	Lady Be Careful	
September 18, 1936	Wives Never Know	
September 24, 1936	Three Married Men	
September 25, 1936	Murder with Pictures	
October 2, 1936	Valiant Is the Word for Carrie	
October 6, 1936	The Big Broadcast of 1937	
October 9, 1936	Wedding Present	
October 16, 1936	Hopalong Cassidy Returns	The seventh Hopalong Cassidy film
October 30, 1936	Rose Bowl	
November 6, 1936	Along Came Love	
November 6, 1936	Easy to Take	
November 16, 1936	The Plainsman	
November 17, 1936	The Accusing Finger	
November 18, 1936	Go West, Young Man	
November 20, 1936	Hideaway Girl	
November 27, 1936	The Jungle Princess	
December 4, 1936	Arizona Mahoney	Reissue title: Arizona Thunderbolt
December 11, 1936	Trail Dust	The eighth Hopalong Cassidy film
December 13, 1936	Let's Make a Million	
December 18, 1936	Mind Your Own Business	
December 19, 1936	College Holiday	

== 1937 ==
Release date	Title	Notes
January 22, 1937	Bulldog Drummond Escapes	The first in Paramount's series of eight Bulldog Drummond films, released between 1937 and 1939.
February 5, 1937	Champagne Waltz	
February 5, 1937	Outcast	
February 12, 1937	Clarence	
February 12, 1937	Maid of Salem	
February 16, 1937	A Doctor's Diary	
February 24, 1937	Murder Goes to College	Followed by Partners in Crime, released in October.
February 26, 1937	John Meade's Woman	
February 26, 1937	Borderland	The ninth Hopalong Cassidy film
March 12, 1937	The Crime Nobody Saw	
March 12, 1937	Swing High, Swing Low	
March 13, 1937	Her Husband Lies	
March 23, 1937	Waikiki Wedding	
April 16, 1937	Hills of Old Wyoming	The tenth Hopalong Cassidy film
April 16, 1937	Internes Can't Take Money	The first Dr. Kildare film and the only one made by Paramount. The series was continued by Metro-Goldwyn-Mayer in 1940.
April 23, 1937	King of Gamblers	
April 30, 1937	Make Way for Tomorrow	Inducted into the National Film Registry in 2010
May 14, 1937	Turn Off the Moon	
May 21, 1937	Night of Mystery	
May 28, 1937	I Met Him in Paris	
May 30, 1937	The Girl from Scotland Yard	
June 4, 1937	Hotel Haywire	
June 11, 1937	The Last Train from Madrid	
June 18, 1937	Mountain Music	
June 25, 1937	The Great Gambini	
June 28, 1937	North of the Rio Grande	The eleventh Hopalong Cassidy film
July 2, 1937	Forlorn River	Reissue title: River of Destiny.
July 2, 1937	Midnight Madonna	
July 9, 1937	Wild Money	
July 16, 1937	Easy Living	
July 21, 1937	High, Wide and Handsome	
July 23, 1937	Rustlers' Valley	The twelfth Hopalong Cassidy film
August 6, 1937	Blonde Trouble	
August 6, 1937	Exclusive	
August 13, 1937	Artists and Models	
August 20, 1937	She's No Lady	
August 20, 1937	Hopalong Rides Again	The thirteenth Hopalong Cassidy film
August 27, 1937	On Such a Night	
September 3, 1937	Souls at Sea	
September 10, 1937	Sophie Lang Goes West	Paramount's third and last Sophie Lang film, following The Notorious Sophie Lang (1934) and The Return of Sophie Lang (1936)
September 17, 1937	Double or Nothing	
September 24, 1937	She Asked for It	
September 24, 1937	Bulldog Drummond Comes Back	The second film in Paramount's Bulldog Drummond series.
October 8, 1937	Partners in Crime	Sequel to Murder Goes to College, (1937).
October 15, 1937	This Way Please	
October 22, 1937	Thunder Trail	Reissue title: Thunder Pass.
October 27, 1937	Angel	
November 5, 1937	Hold 'Em Navy	
November 11, 1937	Night Club Scandal	
November 19, 1937	Blossoms on Broadway	
November 26, 1937	Ebb Tide	
November 26, 1937	The Barrier	
November 26, 1937	Texas Trail	The fourteenth Hopalong Cassidy film
December 3, 1937	Love on Toast	
December 10, 1937	Born to the West	Reissue title: Hell Town
December 16, 1937	Bulldog Drummond's Revenge	The third film in Paramount's Bulldog Drummond series.
December 17, 1937	Daughter of Shanghai	Inducted into the National Film Registry in 2006
December 24, 1937	True Confession	
December 31, 1937	Wells Fargo	
December 31, 1937	Every Day's a Holiday	

== 1938 ==
Release date	Title	Notes
January 14, 1938	Partners of the Plains	The fifteenth Hopalong Cassidy film
January 21, 1938	Thrill of a Lifetime	
February 4, 1938	The Buccaneer (Note: Retained by Paramount)	
February 11, 1938	Scandal Street	
February 11, 1938	The Big Broadcast of 1938	
February 25, 1938	Cassidy of Bar 20	The sixteenth Hopalong Cassidy film
March 11, 1938	Dangerous to Know	
March 18, 1938	Bulldog Drummond's Peril	The fourth film in Paramount's Bulldog Drummond series.
March 19, 1938	Romance in the Dark	
March 25, 1938	Bluebeard's Eighth Wife	
April 1, 1938	Tip-Off Girls	
April 15, 1938	Her Jungle Love	
April 22, 1938	Heart of Arizona	The seventeenth Hopalong Cassidy film
April 29, 1938	College Swing	
May 6, 1938	Doctor Rhythm	
May 11, 1938	Stolen Heaven	
May 20, 1938	Cocoanut Grove	
May 27, 1938	Hunted Men	
June 10, 1938	You and Me	
June 17, 1938	Prison Farm	
June 24, 1938	Bar 20 Justice	The eighteenth Hopalong Cassidy film
July 1, 1938	Tropic Holiday	
July 8, 1938	Pride of the West	The nineteenth Hopalong Cassidy film
July 13, 1938	Professor Beware	Distribution only, produced by Harold Lloyd Corporation.
July 29, 1938	Booloo	
August 5, 1938	Bulldog Drummond in Africa	The fifth film in Paramount's Bulldog Drummond series.
August 12, 1938	The Texans	
August 19, 1938	Give Me a Sailor	
August 26, 1938	Spawn of the North	
September 2, 1938	Sing You Sinners	
September 9, 1938	In Old Mexico	The twentieth Hopalong Cassidy film
September 18, 1938	Sons of the Legion	
September 21, 1938	The Mysterious Rider	Reissue title: Mark of the Avenger.
September 23, 1938	Campus Confessions	
September 30, 1938	King of Alcatraz	
October 7, 1938	Touchdown, Army	
October 14, 1938	The Arkansas Traveler	
October 28, 1938	Men with Wings	
November 3, 1938	Illegal Traffic	
November 11, 1938	If I Were King	
November 11, 1938	Thanks for the Memory	
November 25, 1938	Arrest Bulldog Drummond	The sixth film in Paramount's Bulldog Drummond series.
November 25, 1938	Say It in French	
December 2, 1938	Little Orphan Annie (Note: Owned by Sony Pictures (via Columbia Pictures))	distribution only; Based on the comic strip Little Orphan Annie, by Harold Gray
December 9, 1938	Ride a Crooked Mile	
December 16, 1938	The Frontiersmen	The twentieth-first Hopalong Cassidy film
December 20, 1938	Artists and Models Abroad	
December 23, 1938	Tom Sawyer, Detective	Based on the novel, by Mark Twain.
December 25, 1938	The Beachcomber	Worldwide distribution (outside UK) only, produced by Mayflower Pictures Original British title: Vessel of Wrath

== 1939 ==
Release date	Title	Notes
January 6, 1939	Disbarred	
January 14, 1939	Zaza	
January 20, 1939	Ambush	
January 27, 1939	Paris Honeymoon	
January 27, 1939	Boy Trouble	Followed by Night Work, released in August.
February 3, 1939	St. Louis Blues	
February 10, 1939	Persons in Hiding	
February 10, 1939	...One Third of a Nation...	Based on the play presented by the Federal Theatre Project
February 24, 1939	Sunset Trail	The twenty-second Hopalong Cassidy film
March 3, 1939	Cafe Society	
March 17, 1939	King of Chinatown	
March 24, 1939	Midnight	Inducted into the National Film Registry in 2013
March 31, 1939	Silver on the Sage	The twenty-third Hopalong Cassidy film
March 31, 1939	Sudden Money	
April 7, 1939	I'm from Missouri	
April 14, 1939	Bulldog Drummond's Secret Police	The seventh film in Paramount's Bulldog Drummond series.
April 14, 1939	Never Say Die	
April 19, 1939	Back Door to Heaven	
April 28, 1939	The Lady's from Kentucky	
May 5, 1939	Union Pacific	
May 11, 1939	Hotel Imperial	
May 19, 1939	Some Like It Hot	reissue title: Rhythm Romance.
May 20, 1939	Unmarried	
June 2, 1939	The Gracie Allen Murder Case	based on the novel by S. S. Van Dine.
June 7, 1939	Invitation to Happiness	
June 9, 1939	Undercover Doctor	
June 14, 1939	Stolen Life	remade by Warner Bros. as A Stolen Life (1946).
June 23, 1939	Grand Jury Secrets	
June 23, 1939	Heritage of the Desert	reissue title: Heritage of the Plains.
July 7, 1939	Man About Town	
June 12, 1939	Bulldog Drummond's Bride	The eighth and last film in Paramount's Bulldog Drummond series.
July 14, 1939	Million Dollar Legs	
July 21, 1939	The Magnificent Fraud	
July 24, 1939	Beau Geste	
July 25, 1939	Renegade Trail	The twenty-fourth Hopalong Cassidy film
August 4, 1939	Night Work	sequel to Boy Trouble (1939).
August 16, 1939	Island of Lost Men	
August 18, 1939	This Man Is News	Sequel to this British comedy, This Man in Paris, was released by Paramount in Great Britain in 1939, but did not receive American distribution until it appeared through Monogram in 1942 as Shadows of the Underworld.
August 23, 1939	Our Leading Citizen	
August 24, 1939	Death of a Champion	
August 25, 1939	The Star Maker	
September 8, 1939	Range War	The twenty-fifth Hopalong Cassidy film
September 29, 1939	Honeymoon in Bali	
October 4, 1939	$1,000 a Touchdown	
October 6, 1939	What a Life	The first of Paramount's Aldrich Family comedies
October 13, 1939	Jamaica Inn (Note: Owned by Cohen Media Group; sales rights represented by HanWay Films)	Worldwide distribution (outside UK) only, produced by Mayflower Pictures
October 20, 1939	Television Spy	
October 27, 1939	Disputed Passage	
November 3, 1939	Law of the Pampas	The twenty-sixth Hopalong Cassidy film
November 10, 1939	The Cat and the Canary	
November 17, 1939	Rulers of the Sea	
November 24, 1939	Our Neighbors – The Carters	
December 1, 1939	The Night of Nights	
December 8, 1939	The Llano Kid	
December 15, 1939	All Women Have Secrets	
December 22, 1939	Gulliver's Travels (Note: In the public domain) (Note: Retained by Paramount (via Melange Pictures))	The first animated feature film from Fleischer Studios. Based on the novel by Jonathan Swift
December 24, 1939	The Light That Failed	
December 29, 1939	The Great Victor Herbert	

== See also ==
- Lists of Paramount Pictures films
- List of Paramount Pictures films (1912–1919)
- List of Paramount Pictures films (1920–1929)
- List of Paramount Pictures films (1940–1949)
- List of Paramount Pictures films (1950–1959)
- List of Paramount Pictures films (1960–1969)
- List of Paramount Pictures films (1970–1979)
- List of Paramount Pictures films (1980–1989)
- List of Paramount Pictures films (1990–1999)
- List of Paramount Pictures films (2000–2009)
- List of Paramount Pictures films (2010–2019)
- List of Paramount Pictures films (2020–2029)
