= Lists of Paramount Pictures films =

Logo used since 2026

The following are lists of Paramount Pictures films by decade:

== Lists ==
- List of Paramount Pictures films (1912–1919)
- List of Paramount Pictures films (1920–1929)
- List of Paramount Pictures films (1930–1939)
- List of Paramount Pictures films (1940–1949)
- List of Paramount Pictures films (1950–1959)
- List of Paramount Pictures films (1960–1969)
- List of Paramount Pictures films (1970–1979)
- List of Paramount Pictures films (1980–1989)
- List of Paramount Pictures films (1990–1999)
- List of Paramount Pictures films (2000–2009)
- List of Paramount Pictures films (2010–2019)
- List of Paramount Pictures films (2020–2029)

== See also ==
- List of United International Pictures films
- Paramount Pictures
- Category:Lists of films by studio
