= Eric Eisner =

Eric Eisner may refer to:

- Eric Eisner (producer), American entrepreneur
- Eric Eisner (lawyer), American lawyer
