= The Geffen Film Company =

US film distribution and production company

The Geffen Company The Geffen Film Company, Inc. Geffen Pictures
- Logo used in 2024 for Beetlejuice Beetlejuice
- Type: Subsidiary
- Industry: Film distributor and production company
- Founded: 1982; 44 years ago
- Founder: David Geffen
- Defunct: 1998; 28 years ago
- Fate: Folded into Warner Bros.
- Successors: DreamWorks Pictures
- Headquarters: Los Angeles, California, United States
- Key people: David Geffen; Eric Eisner
- Divisions: Geffen Records (1980–1999); Geffen Television

Logo used from 1982 to 1998, and again for its 2024 revival

The Geffen Film Company (also known as The Geffen Company, The Geffen Film Company, Inc., and later Geffen Pictures) was an American film distributor and production company founded by David Geffen, the founder of Geffen Records, and future co-founder of DreamWorks. The spherical Geffen Pictures logo, based on the logo of its record-label counterpart, was created by Saul Bass. Their most famous films are Risky Business (1983), Little Shop of Horrors (1986), Beetlejuice (1988) and its 2024 sequel, and Interview with the Vampire (1994).

== History ==
Geffen founded the company in 1982, having recruited Eric Eisner as president, and distributed its films through Warner Bros. Geffen was operated as a division of Warner Bros. That same year, the company released its inaugural film Personal Best directed by Robert Towne.

In 1990, The Geffen Film Company was renamed and reorganized as Geffen Pictures.

In 1993, Geffen and MTV Productions struck a two-picture deal. This resulted in the 1996 films Joe's Apartment and Beavis and Butt-Head Do America. In 1994, the fate of the company was sealed when Geffen teamed up with Steven Spielberg and Jeffrey Katzenberg to form DreamWorks Pictures, which combined from the ashes of Geffen Pictures and Amblin Entertainment.

The Geffen Pictures brand continued to be used on films by David Geffen until 1998, after the April release of The Butcher Boy, when it was folded into Warner Bros. film divisions. Today, the studio owns the rights to the original company's library, with the exception of Beavis and Butt-Head Do America, which is owned by Paramount Pictures. Ironically, Paramount (Paramount Skydance Corporation) and Warner Bros. (Warner Bros. Discovery) would eventually merge together to form Skydance Corporation in October 2026, meaning that they completely own Geffen’s library.

In 2024, the company made a brief revival as a copyright holder and received studio credit for the release of the Beetlejuice sequel, Beetlejuice Beetlejuice.

== Filmography ==
=== Feature films ===
==== 1980s ====
Release date	Title	Director	Notes	Names	Budget	Gross (worldwide)
February 5, 1982	Personal Best	Robert Towne		The Geffen Film Company	$15 million	$5.6 million
August 5, 1983	Risky Business	Paul Brickman		The Geffen Film Company	$6.2 million	$63.5 million
March 15, 1985	Lost in America	Albert Brooks		The Geffen Film Company	$4 million	$10.1 million
September 13, 1985	After Hours	Martin Scorsese	co-production with Double Play Productions	The Geffen Film Company	$4.5 million	$10.6 million
December 19, 1986	Little Shop of Horrors	Frank Oz		The Geffen Film Company	$25 million	$39 million
March 30, 1988	Beetlejuice	Tim Burton		The Geffen Film Company	$15 million	$74.2 million

==== 1990s ====
Release date	Title	Director	Notes	Names	Budget	Gross (worldwide)
February 2, 1990	Men Don't Leave	Paul Brickman		The Geffen Film Company	$7 million	$6 million
March 22, 1991	Defending Your Life	Albert Brooks		Geffen Pictures	N/A	$16.4 million
December 13, 1991	The Last Boy Scout	Tony Scott	co-production with Silver Pictures	Geffen Pictures	$43 million	$114.5 million
October 1, 1993	M. Butterfly	David Cronenberg		Geffen Pictures	$17–18 million	$1.4 million
November 11, 1994	Interview with the Vampire	Neil Jordan		Geffen Pictures	$60 million	$223.7 million
July 26, 1996	Joe's Apartment	John Payson	co-production with MTV Productions	Geffen Pictures	$13 million	$4.6 million
October 11, 1996	Michael Collins	Neil Jordan		Geffen Pictures	$25 million	$27.5 million
December 20, 1996	Beavis and Butt-Head Do America	Mike Judge	co-production with Paramount Pictures and MTV Productions	Geffen Pictures	$12 million	$63.1 million
July 13, 1997	The Butcher Boy	Neil Jordan		Geffen Pictures	N/A	$1.96 million

==== 2020s ====
Release date	Title	Director	Notes	Names	Budget	Gross (worldwide)
September 6, 2024	Beetlejuice Beetlejuice	Tim Burton	copyright holder and studio credit only; produced by Plan B Entertainment and Tim Burton Productions	The Geffen Company	$100 million	$451.1 million

=== Television series ===
Years	Title	Networks	Notes	Names	Seasons	Episodes
1989–1996	Tales from the Crypt	HBO	Co-production with Tales from the Crypt Holdings	Uncredited	7	93
1989–1991	Beetlejuice	ABC (seasons 1–3); Fox Kids (season 4)	Co-production with Warner Bros. Television, Tim Burton, Inc. and Nelvana	The Geffen Film Company (seasons 1–2); Geffen Pictures (seasons 3–4)	4	94

=== Unrealized projects ===
In 1994, Geffen began development on a feature film based on the children's television series Barney & Friends for a planned release in 1995. However, disagreements with The Lyons Group, the creator of the series, over marketing led to them selling the rights to PolyGram Filmed Entertainment in 1996. The film was eventually released by them as Barney's Great Adventure on April 3, 1998.
