= Young Eisner Scholars =

Educational charity

Young Eisner Scholars (YES)
- Legal status: non-profit 501(c)(3)
- Headquarters: Los Angeles, California
- Location: Los Angeles, New York City, Chicago, Appalachia
- President and Founder: Eric Eisner
- Website: www.yesscholars.org

Young Eisner Scholars (YES) is a nonprofit organization dedicated to identifying underserved students and providing them with resources and support to facilitate their success in high school, college, and beyond.

== History ==
Eric Eisner started identifying students from the Lennox School District in Los Angeles in 1998. The organization became established as a 501(c)3 nonprofit organization in 2010. Services expanded to New York City in 2012, Chicago in 2014, and the Appalachian region in 2015.

== Impact ==
YES takes on about 60 new students each year and currently serves over 500 students. YES has disbursed over $75 million in scholarships and financial aid as of June 2017.
