= List of Paramount Pictures films (1990–1999) =

The following is a list of films originally released, produced, and/or distributed theatrically by Paramount Pictures and released in the 1990s.

== 1990 ==
| Release date | Title | Notes |
|---|---|---|
| January 12, 1990 | Internal Affairs | |
| February 2, 1990 | Flashback | |
| March 2, 1990 | The Hunt for Red October | co-production with Mace Neufeld Productions |
| April 13, 1990 | Crazy People | |
| May 4, 1990 | Tales from the Darkside: The Movie | North American distribution only; co-production with Laurel Productions |
| May 11, 1990 | A Show of Force | North American and select international distribution only; produced by Golden Harvest |
| June 8, 1990 | Another 48 Hrs. | co-production with Lawrence Gordon Productions and Eddie Murphy Productions |
| June 27, 1990 | Days of Thunder | co-production with Don Simpson/Jerry Bruckheimer Films |
| July 13, 1990 | Ghost | Nominee for the Academy Award for Best Picture; Nominee for the Golden Globe Award for Best Motion Picture – Musical or Comedy |
| August 10, 1990 | The Two Jakes | |
| September 21, 1990 | Funny About Love | co-production with Duffy Films and Avnet/Kerner Productions |
| October 12, 1990 | Welcome Home, Roxy Carmichael | North American distribution only; produced by ITC Entertainment (Note: Currently co-owned by ITV Studios; around 2025, Paramount reclaimed North American rights to this film via Miramax) |
| October 26, 1990 | Graveyard Shift | North American distribution only; co-production with Sugar Entertainment |
| December 19, 1990 | Almost an Angel | co-production with Ironbark Films |
| December 25, 1990 | The Godfather Part III | co-production with Zoetrope Studios; Nominee for the Academy Award for Best Picture; Nominee for the Golden Globe Award for Best Motion Picture – Drama |

== 1991 ==
| Release date | Title | Notes |
|---|---|---|
| January 18, 1991 | Flight of the Intruder | co-production with Mace Neufeld Productions and Robert Rehme Productions |
| February 22, 1991 | He Said, She Said | |
| March 15, 1991 | The Perfect Weapon | |
| March 15, 1991 | True Colors | co-production with Laurence Mark Productions |
| April 26, 1991 | Talent for the Game | |
| May 31, 1991 | Soapdish | |
| June 28, 1991 | The Naked Gun 2½: The Smell of Fear | co-production with Zucker/Abrahams/Zucker Productions |
| July 10, 1991 | Regarding Henry | co-production with Scott Rudin Productions |
| August 2, 1991 | Body Parts | |
| August 23, 1991 | Dead Again | co-production with Mirage Enterprises |
| September 27, 1991 | Necessary Roughness | co-production with Mace Neufeld Productions and Robert Rehme Productions |
| October 11, 1991 | Frankie and Johnny | |
| October 11, 1991 | Stepping Out | |
| October 25, 1991 | The Butcher's Wife | co-production with Nicita/Lloyd Productions |
| November 8, 1991 | All I Want for Christmas | |
| November 22, 1991 | The Addams Family | North American distribution only; co-production with Scott Rudin Productions; distributed internationally by Orion Pictures |
| December 6, 1991 | Star Trek VI: The Undiscovered Country | |

== 1992 ==
| Release date | Title | Notes |
|---|---|---|
| January 17, 1992 | Juice | North American distribution only; produced by Island World and Moritz/Heyman Productions |
| February 14, 1992 | Wayne's World | co-production with Broadway Video |
| March 27, 1992 | Ladybugs | North American distribution only; co-production with Ladybugs Productions |
| April 17, 1992 | Brain Donors | |
| May 1, 1992 | K2 | U.S theatrical co-distribution with Miramax Films only; produced by Trans Pacific Films and Majestic Films International |
| June 5, 1992 | Patriot Games | co-production with Mace Neufeld Productions and Robert Rehme Productions |
| July 1, 1992 | Boomerang | co-production with Imagine Films Entertainment and Eddie Murphy Productions |
| July 10, 1992 | Cool World | co-production with Bakshi Productions |
| July 31, 1992 | Bebe's Kids | co-production with The Hudlin Brothers and Hyperion Pictures |
| August 7, 1992 | Whispers in the Dark | |
| August 21, 1992 | Emily Brontë's Wuthering Heights (Note: Paramount has since reclaimed international rights to this film) | North American, U.K. and Irish distribution only |
| August 28, 1992 | Pet Sematary Two | co-production with Columbus Circle Films |
| September 4, 1992 | Bob Roberts (Note: Owned by Lionsgate) | North American theatrical co-distribution with Miramax Films only; produced by PolyGram, Live Entertainment and Working Title Films |
| September 18, 1992 | School Ties | co-production with Jaffe/Lansing Productions |
| October 9, 1992 | 1492: Conquest of Paradise | North American distribution only; produced by Percy Main Productions and Légende Entreprises |
| October 30, 1992 | There Goes the Neighborhood | North American distribution only; produced by Kings Road Entertainment |
| November 6, 1992 | Jennifer 8 | co-production with Scott Rudin Productions |
| December 18, 1992 | Leap of Faith | |

== 1993 ==
| Release date | Title | Notes |
|---|---|---|
| January 15, 1993 | Alive | international distribution only; co-production with Touchstone Pictures and The Kennedy/Marshall Company |
| February 12, 1993 | The Temp | co-production with Permut Presentations |
| March 12, 1993 | Fire in the Sky | co-production with Wizan/Black Productions |
| April 7, 1993 | Indecent Proposal | |
| May 21, 1993 | Sliver | |
| June 30, 1993 | The Firm | co-production with Davis Entertainment, Scott Rudin Productions and Mirage Enterprises |
| July 16, 1993 | The Thing Called Love | co-production with Davis Entertainment |
| July 23, 1993 | Coneheads | co-production with Broadway Video |
| August 11, 1993 | Searching for Bobby Fischer | co-production with Scott Rudin Productions and Mirage Enterprises |
| September 24, 1993 | Bopha! | co-production with Arsenio Hall Communications and Taubman Entertainment Group |
| October 17, 1993 | It's All True: Based on an Unfinished Film by Orson Welles | U.S. distribution only; produced by Les Films Balenciaga |
| November 5, 1993 | Flesh and Bone | co-production with Mirage Enterprises and Spring Creek Productions |
| November 19, 1993 | Addams Family Values | co-production with Scott Rudin Productions |
| December 10, 1993 | Wayne's World 2 | co-production with Broadway Video |
| December 17, 1993 | What's Eating Gilbert Grape | North American distribution only; co-production with Matalon Teper Ohlsson |

== 1994 ==
| Release date | Title | Notes |
|---|---|---|
| January 21, 1994 | Intersection | |
| February 18, 1994 | Blue Chips | |
| March 18, 1994 | Naked Gun 33 1/3: The Final Insult | |
| March 30, 1994 | Jimmy Hollywood | co-production with Baltimore Pictures |
| May 25, 1994 | Beverly Hills Cop III | co-production with Mace Neufeld Productions, Robert Rehme Productions and Eddie Murphy Productions |
| July 6, 1994 | Forrest Gump | co-production with The Steve Tisch Company and Wendy Finerman Productions; Winner of the Academy Award for Best Picture; Winner of the Golden Globe Award for Best Motion Picture – Drama; Inducted into the National Film Registry in 2011 |
| July 22, 1994 | Lassie | co-production with Broadway Pictures |
| August 3, 1994 | Clear and Present Danger | co-production with Mace Neufeld Productions and Robert Rehme Productions |
| August 17, 1994 | Andre | North American distribution only; co-production with The Kushner-Locke Company |
| August 31, 1994 | Milk Money | co-production with The Kennedy/Marshall Company |
| October 12, 1994 | The Browning Version | British film; co-production with Percy Main Productions |
| November 4, 1994 | Pontiac Moon | |
| November 18, 1994 | Star Trek Generations | |
| December 9, 1994 | Drop Zone | co-production with Nicita/Lloyd Productions |
| December 23, 1994 | Nobody's Fool | North American distribution only; co-production with Capella International, Scott Rudin Productions and Cinehaus |
| December 25, 1994 | I.Q. | co-production with Sandollar Productions and Scott Rudin Productions |

== 1995 ==
| Release date | Title | Notes |
|---|---|---|
| February 17, 1995 | The Brady Bunch Movie | co-production with The Ladd Company |
| March 17, 1995 | Losing Isaiah | |
| March 31, 1995 | Tommy Boy | co-production with Broadway Video |
| April 12, 1995 | Stuart Saves His Family | co-production with Constellation Films and Broadway Video |
| May 24, 1995 | Braveheart | North American distribution only; produced by Icon Productions and The Ladd Company; distributed internationally by 20th Century Fox; Winner of the Academy Award for Best Picture; Nominee for the Golden Globe Award for Best Motion Picture – Drama |
| June 9, 1995 | Congo | co-production with The Kennedy/Marshall Company |
| July 14, 1995 | The Indian in the Cupboard | international home media and free television and North American theatrical and pay television distribution only; co-production with Columbia Pictures, The Kennedy/Marshall Company and Scholastic Productions |
| July 19, 1995 | Clueless | co-production with Scott Rudin Productions; Inducted into the National Film Registry in 2025 |
| August 4, 1995 | Virtuosity | co-production with Gary Lucchesi Productions |
| October 13, 1995 | Jade | co-production with Robert Evans Productions and Adelson/Baumgarten Productions |
| October 27, 1995 | Vampire in Brooklyn | co-production with Eddie Murphy Productions |
| November 3, 1995 | Home for the Holidays (Note: Co-owned by MGM) | U.S. theatrical, Canadian theatrical and television and South American distribution only; produced by PolyGram Filmed Entertainment and Egg Pictures |
| November 22, 1995 | Nick of Time | |
| December 15, 1995 | Sabrina | distribution outside Germany, Austria, Poland, Slovakia and the Czech Republic only; co-production with Constellation Films, Mirage Enterprises, Scott Rudin Productions and Sandollar Productions; Nominee for the Golden Globe Award for Best Motion Picture – Musical or Comedy |

== 1996 ==
| Release date | Title | Notes |
|---|---|---|
| January 12, 1996 | Eye for an Eye | |
| February 2, 1996 | Black Sheep | co-production with Broadway Video |
| April 3, 1996 | Primal Fear | co-production with Rysher Entertainment |
| April 12, 1996 | Kids in the Hall: Brain Candy | Canadian film; co-production with Lakeshore Entertainment and Broadway Video |
| May 22, 1996 | Mission: Impossible | co-production with Cruise/Wagner Productions |
| June 7, 1996 | The Phantom | co-production with The Ladd Company and Village Roadshow Pictures |
| July 10, 1996 | Harriet the Spy | co-production with Nickelodeon Movies and Rastar |
| August 9, 1996 | Escape from L.A. | co-production with Rysher Entertainment |
| August 23, 1996 | A Very Brady Sequel | co-production with The Ladd Company |
| September 20, 1996 | The First Wives Club | co-production with Scott Rudin Productions |
| October 11, 1996 | The Ghost and the Darkness | distribution outside Germany, Austria, Italy, Poland, Slovakia and the Czech Republic only; produced by Constellation Films and Douglas/Reuther Productions |
| October 25, 1996 | Thinner (Note: Paramount currently owns worldwide rights to this film as a result of the acquisition of Spelling Entertainment in 1999 by then-parent Viacom) | North American theatrical distribution only; produced by Spelling Films |
| November 1, 1996 | Dear God | co-production with Rysher Entertainment and The Steve Tisch Company |
| November 22, 1996 | Star Trek: First Contact | |
| December 20, 1996 | Beavis and Butt-Head Do America | co-production with Geffen Pictures and MTV Productions |
| December 25, 1996 | The Evening Star (Note: Paramount now owns worldwide distribution rights to this film, having acquired them from Rysher Entertainment's then-parent Cox Enterprises in 1999) | North and Latin American, French and Japanese distribution only; co-production with Rysher Entertainment |
| December 25, 1996 | Mother | co-production with Scott Rudin Productions |

== 1997 ==
| Release date | Title | Notes |
|---|---|---|
| January 10, 1997 | The Relic | North American distribution only; co-production with Cloud Nine Entertainment and Pacific Western Productions |
| February 7, 1997 | The Beautician and the Beast (Note: Co-owned by Content Partners, LLC) | co-production with the Koch Company and High School Sweethearts |
| March 7, 1997 | Private Parts | distribution in North and Latin America, France, Germany, Austria and Japan only; co-production with Rysher Entertainment and Northern Lights Entertainment |
| April 4, 1997 | The Saint | co-production with Rysher Entertainment and Mace Neufeld Productions |
| May 2, 1997 | Breakdown | North and Hispanic American and Korean distribution only; produced by Dino De Laurentiis Company and Spelling Films |
| May 16, 1997 | Night Falls on Manhattan | North American theatrical and French distribution only; produced by Spelling Films and Mount/Kramer Productions |
| May 30, 1997 | 'Til There Was You | North American, U.K., Irish, French and Japanese distribution only; co-production with Lakeshore Entertainment |
| June 27, 1997 | Face/Off | North American distribution only; co-production with Douglas/Reuther Productions, WCG Productions and Permut Presentations; distributed internationally by Touchstone Pictures |
| July 18, 1997 | Kiss Me, Guido | North American, U.K. and Irish distribution only; produced by Kardana/Swinsky Films, Capitol Films and Redeemable Features |
| July 25, 1997 | Good Burger | co-production with Nickelodeon Movies and Tollin/Robbins Productions |
| August 15, 1997 | Event Horizon | co-production with Lawrence Gordon Productions, Golar Productions and Impact Pictures |
| August 22, 1997 | A Smile Like Yours | North and Latin American and French distribution only; co-production with Rysher Entertainment |
| September 19, 1997 | In & Out | North American, U.K., Irish, French and Benelux distribution only; co-production with Spelling Films and Scott Rudin Productions |
| October 3, 1997 | Kiss the Girls | co-production with Rysher Entertainment and Brown/Wizan Productions |
| October 24, 1997 | FairyTale: A True Story | North American distribution only; co-production with Icon Productions and Wendy Finerman Productions |
| October 31, 1997 | Switchback | North and Latin American and French distribution only; co-production with Rysher Entertainment and Pacific Western Productions |
| November 21, 1997 | The Rainmaker | distribution outside Germany, Austria, Italy, Poland, Slovakia, the Czech Republic and Japan only; produced by Constellation Films, Douglas/Reuther Productions and American Zoetrope |
| December 19, 1997 | Titanic | North American distribution only; co-production with 20th Century Fox and Lightstorm Entertainment; Winner of the Academy Award for Best Picture; Winner of the Golden Globe Award for Best Motion Picture – Drama; Inducted into the National Film Registry in 2017 |
| December 25, 1997 | The Education of Little Tree | distribution outside Spain only; produced by Allied Filmmakers and Lightmotive |

== 1998 ==
| Release date | Title | Notes |
|---|---|---|
| January 16, 1998 | Hard Rain | North American distribution only; co-production with Mutual Film Company |
| February 27, 1998 | The Real Blonde | North American, Australian and New Zealand distribution only; co-production with Lakeshore Entertainment |
| March 6, 1998 | Twilight | co-production with Cinehaus and Scott Rudin Productions |
| April 10, 1998 | The Odd Couple II | co-production with Cort/Madden Productions |
| April 24, 1998 | Sliding Doors (Note: Distribution rights currently co-owned by Resurgence Media Group, AMBI Group and Raven Capital Management, with US distribution handled by Shout! Studios and UK distribution handled by Icon Film Distribution) | distribution in the U.S. on television and home media, the U.K., Ireland, Australia and New Zealand only; co-acquisition with Miramax Films; produced by Intermedia Films and Mirage Enterprises |
| May 8, 1998 | Deep Impact (Note: Paramount now owns worldwide rights to this film as a result of its brief ownership of DreamWorks Pictures from 2006–2008) | North American distribution only; co-production with DreamWorks Pictures, Amblin Entertainment and Zanuck/Brown Productions |
| June 5, 1998 | The Truman Show | co-production with Scott Rudin Productions; Nominee for the Golden Globe Award for Best Motion Picture – Drama; Inducted into the National Film Registry in 2025 |
| July 24, 1998 | Saving Private Ryan | international distribution and United States co distribution only; co-production with DreamWorks Pictures, Amblin Entertainment and Mutual Film Company; Nominee for the Academy Award for Best Picture; Winner of the Golden Globe Award for Best Motion Picture – Drama; Inducted into the National Film Registry in 2014 |
| August 7, 1998 | Snake Eyes | North American distribution only; co-production with DeBart Productions; distributed internationally by Touchstone Pictures |
| August 21, 1998 | Dead Man on Campus | co-production with MTV Productions and Pacific Western Productions |
| October 2, 1998 | A Night at the Roxbury | co-production with SNL Studios and Broadway Video |
| November 20, 1998 | The Rugrats Movie | co-production with Nickelodeon Movies and Klasky Csupo |
| December 11, 1998 | A Simple Plan | North American distribution only; co-production with Mutual Film Company and Savoy Pictures |
| December 11, 1998 | Star Trek: Insurrection | |
| December 25, 1998 | A Civil Action | international distribution only; co-production with Touchstone Pictures, Wildwood Enterprises and Scott Rudin Productions |

== 1999 ==
| Release date | Title | Notes |
|---|---|---|
| January 15, 1999 | Varsity Blues | co-production with MTV Productions, Marquee/Tollin/Robbins and Tova Laiter Productions |
| February 5, 1999 | Payback (Note: U.S. rights owned by Icon Productions, with Samuel Goldwyn Films handling distribution) | North American distribution only; produced by Icon Productions |
| February 26, 1999 | 200 Cigarettes | North American, U.K. and Irish distribution only; co-production with Lakeshore Entertainment, MTV Productions and Dogstar Films |
| April 1, 1999 | The Out-of-Towners | co-production with Robert Evans Productions, Cherry Alley Productions and The Cort/Madden Company |
| May 7, 1999 | Election | co-production with MTV Productions and Bona Fide Productions |
| June 18, 1999 | The General's Daughter | co-production with Mace Neufeld Productions and Robert Rehme Productions |
| June 30, 1999 | South Park: Bigger, Longer & Uncut (Note: Paramount now owns worldwide rights to this film, having acquired Warner Bros. Discovery in 2026.) | North American distribution only; co-production with Warner Bros. Pictures, Comedy Central Films, Scott Rudin Productions and Braniff Productions |
| July 16, 1999 | The Wood | co-production with MTV Productions and Bona Fide Productions |
| July 30, 1999 | Runaway Bride | North American distribution only; co-production with Touchstone Pictures, Interscope Communications and Lakeshore Entertainment |
| September 24, 1999 | Double Jeopardy | |
| October 8, 1999 | Superstar | co-production with SNL Studios and Broadway Video |
| October 22, 1999 | Bringing Out the Dead | North American distribution only; co-production with Touchstone Pictures, Scott Rudin Productions and Cappa/De Fina |
| November 19, 1999 | Sleepy Hollow | distribution outside the U.K., Ireland, France, Australia, New Zealand, Greece, Cyprus, Germany, Austria, Switzerland, Belgium, Italy, Spain and Japan only; produced by Mandalay Pictures, Scott Rudin Productions and American Zoetrope |
| December 25, 1999 | Angela's Ashes | North American distribution only; co-production with Universal Pictures International, David Brown Productions, Scott Rudin Productions and Dirty Hands Productions |
| December 25, 1999 | The Talented Mr. Ripley (Note: Paramount now owns worldwide rights to this film, having acquired a 49% stake in Miramax in 2020) | North American distribution only; co-acquisition with Miramax Films; produced by Mirage Enterprises and Timnick Films; Nominee for the Golden Globe Award for Best Motion Picture – Drama |
