= Eric Eisner (lawyer) =

American lawyer

- Born: New York City, U.S.
- Education: Columbia University (BA, JD)
- Occupations: Lawyer, studio executive, philanthropist
- Title: Former president of Geffen Pictures, founder of Young Eisner Scholars
- Spouse: Lisa Norris
- Children: 3
- Relatives: Ashley Olsen (daughter-in-law)

Eric Eisner is an American entertainment industry lawyer and executive who served as president of The Geffen Film Company and Island World Inc. He also founded the Young Eisner Scholars (YES) program.

== Biography ==
Eisner grew up in Greenwich Village and attended Little Red Schoolhouse and Elisabeth Irwin High School. worked as a songwriter and played drums for The Strangers, a New York rock band. He wrote a number of songs that were recorded by various artists in the 1960s, including "No Sun Today" (Buffalo Springfield), "Emily's Illness" (Nora Guthrie), and "Too Young to Be One" (The Turtles).

He received his B.A. from Columbia University in 1970 and J.D. from Columbia Law School in 1973. In college, he joined Students for a Democratic Society and took part in the Columbia University protests of 1968.

After law school, Eisner accepted an offer at the law firm Kaplan Livingston Goodwin Berkowitz & Selvin in Los Angeles, then the largest entertainment law firm in the world. In 1980, he was recruited by David Geffen to be head of his production company and oversaw the production of films such as Risky Business and Beetlejuice, as well as Broadway plays M. Butterfly and Cats.

After retiring from the entertainment industry, Eisner founded the Young Eisner Scholars program in 1998. The program identifies gifted students from disadvantaged schools in Los Angeles and places them in the city's best prep and magnet schools. The program has also mobilized $50 million in financial aid and scholarships to fund its scholars’ college tuition and fees, and has placed participants in top-tier universities in the country.

Because of his activism in improving public school education, Malcolm Gladwell described Eisner as the "DuBois of the barrio" and "the L.A. school system’s Lone Ranger." Eisner was also featured in Gladwell's podcast, Revisionist History. He was named "Innovator of the Year" in education by The Wall Street Journal in 2012, and one of the "Biggest Philanthropists of 2018" by Town & Country.

== Personal life and family ==
His wife, Lisa (née Norris) Eisner, worked as the West Coast editor for Vogue magazine. She is also a photographer, jewelry designer, and art collector. They have two sons. The couple lives in a Bel Air, Los Angeles home designed by Cliff May.

His younger son married former actress and fashion designer Ashley Olsen in late 2022.
