= Personal Best =

A personal best (also called personal record) is an athlete's best performance in his or her life.

As a title, Personal Best may refer to:

- Personal Best (album), a 1995 album by Team Dresch
- Personal Best (band), an English band on the Specialist Subject Records label
- Personal Best (film), a 1982 feature film starring Mariel Hemingway
- Monty Python's Personal Best, a 2006 miniseries
- Personal Best, a 1990 album by Selena
- "Personal Best", a song by Maisie Peters from It's Your Bed Babe, It's Your Funeral, 2019
