= List of Paramount Pictures films (1980–1989) =

The following is a list of films originally produced and/or distributed theatrically by Paramount Pictures and released in the 1980s.

== 1980 ==
Release date	Title	Notes
February 8, 1980	American Gigolo	
March 20, 1980	Nijinsky	
March 21, 1980	Little Darlings	co-production with Kings Road Productions
March 28, 1980	Serial	
May 9, 1980	Friday the 13th (Note: Skydance now owns worldwide rights to this film, having acquired Paramount Global in 2025 and Warner Bros. Discovery in 2026.)	North American distribution only; produced by Georgetown Productions
May 30, 1980	Bon Voyage, Charlie Brown (and Don't Come Back!!)	co-production with United Feature Syndicate and Bill Melendez Productions
June 2, 1980	The Outsider	British film
June 6, 1980	Urban Cowboy	
June 19, 1980	Rough Cut	
July 2, 1980	Airplane!	Inducted into the National Film Registry in 2010
August 1, 1980	The Hunter	co-production with Rastar
September 9, 1980	Phobia	U.S. distribution only; produced by Borough Park Productions
September 19, 1980	Ordinary People	co-production with Wildwood Enterprises; Winner of the Academy Award for Best Picture
October 3, 1980	Coast to Coast	
October 10, 1980	The Elephant Man (Note: Currently owned by StudioCanal, with North American distribution rights licensed to Janus Films and the Criterion Collection)	North American distribution only; produced by Brooksfilms; Nominee for the Academy Award for Best Picture
October 17, 1980	Breaking Glass	North American distribution only; produced by Allied Stars
December 12, 1980	Popeye	North American distribution only, co-production with Walt Disney Productions

== 1981 ==
Release date	Title	Notes
January 2, 1981	Leap Year	
February 11, 1981	My Bloody Valentine	Canadian film; co-production with Canadian Film Development Corporation and Secret Film Company
March 20, 1981	The Postman Always Rings Twice (Note: Paramount's parent Skydance has since reclaimed worldwide rights to this film as a result of its acquisition of Warner Bros. Discovery in 2026)	North American theatrical distribution only; produced by Lorimar
March 20, 1981	Kelly	Canadian distribution and U.S. cable television only
April 3, 1981	Atlantic City	North American distribution only; produced by International Cinema Corporation and Selta Films; Nominee for the Academy Award for Best Picture. Inducted into the National Film Registry in 2003
April 10, 1981	Going Ape!	co-production with Hemdale
May 1, 1981	Friday the 13th Part II	co-production with Georgetown Productions
May 5, 1981	Second-Hand Hearts	North American theatrical distribution only; produced by Lorimar
May 15, 1981	The Fan	distribution only; produced by The Stigwood Group
June 5, 1981	The Sea Wolves	North American theatrical distribution only; produced by Lorimar
June 12, 1981	Raiders of the Lost Ark	distribution only; produced by Lucasfilm Ltd. Nominee for the Academy Award for Best Picture. Inducted into the National Film Registry in 1999
June 26, 1981	Dragonslayer	North American distribution only; co-production with Walt Disney Productions
July 1, 1981	S.O.B.	North American theatrical distribution only; produced by Lorimar
July 30, 1981	Escape to Victory	North American theatrical distribution only; produced by Lorimar
July 1981	Gas	Canadian film; distribution only; produced by Filmplan International, Davis-Panzer Productions, and Canadian Film Development Corporation
August 7, 1981	Student Bodies	distribution only
August 21, 1981	First Monday in October	
August 28, 1981	Gallipoli	distribution outside Australia and New Zealand only; co-production with Robert Stigwood Productions and Associated R&R Films
September 11, 1981	Night School	North American theatrical distribution only; produced by Lorimar
September 18, 1981	Mommie Dearest	
October 2, 1981	Paternity	
November 20, 1981	Ragtime	North American, Australian and New Zealand distribution only; produced by Dino De Laurentiis Corporation
December 4, 1981	Reds	Nominee for the Academy Award for Best Picture

== 1982 ==
Release date	Title	Notes
January 29, 1982	Venom	North American theatrical distribution only; produced by Morison Film Group
February 12, 1982	Love and Money	North American theatrical distribution only; produced by Lorimar
March 5, 1982	I'm Dancing as Fast as I Can	
April 2, 1982	Some Kind of Hero	
April 30, 1982	Partners	
May 21, 1982	Fighting Back	North American distribution only; produced by Dino De Laurentiis Corporation
June 4, 1982	Star Trek II: The Wrath of Khan	Inducted into the National Film Registry in 2024
June 11, 1982	Grease 2	co-production with Robert Stigwood Productions
August 13, 1982	An Officer and a Gentleman	co-production with Lorimar
August 13, 1982	Friday the 13th Part III	co-production with Jason Productions
October 1, 1982	Jekyll and Hyde... Together Again	
October 8, 1982	Lookin' to Get Out	North American theatrical distribution only; produced by Lorimar
October 22, 1982	The Sender	British film; co-production with Kingsmere Properties
October 29, 1982	It Came from Hollywood	
November 12, 1982	White Dog	
November 19, 1982	Ladies and Gentlemen, The Fabulous Stains	
November 19, 1982	Heidi's Song	North American theatrical distribution only; produced by Hanna-Barbera
December 8, 1982	48 Hrs.	
December 10, 1982	Airplane II: The Sequel	

== 1983 ==
Release date	Title	Notes
February 18, 1983	The Lords of Discipline	co-production with Jaffe/Katzka Productions
March 4, 1983	Baby It's You	distribution only; produced by Double Play Productions
April 1, 1983	Man, Woman and Child	North American distribution only; co-production with Gaylord Productions
April 15, 1983	Flashdance	co-production with PolyGram Pictures
May 6, 1983	Still Smokin'	
June 8, 1983	Trading Places	co-production with Landis/Folsey Productions
July 15, 1983	Staying Alive	co-production with Robert Stigwood Productions
August 12, 1983	The Man Who Wasn't There	
August 26, 1983	Daniel	North American distribution only
September 30, 1983	Beyond The Limit	North American distribution only; produced by World Film Services and Parsons & Whittemore Lyddon, Ltd.
October 21, 1983	The Dead Zone	North American distribution only; produced by Dino De Laurentiis Corporation
November 4, 1983	Testament	distribution only; produced by Entertainment Events and American Playhouse
November 18, 1983	Nate and Hayes	distribution outside Australia and New Zealand only; produced by Phillips-Whitehouse Productions
December 9, 1983	Terms of Endearment	Winner of the Academy Award for Best Picture
December 16, 1983	Uncommon Valor	
December 16, 1983	The Keep	

== 1984 ==
Release date	Title	Notes
February 17, 1984	Footloose	
March 23, 1984	Racing with the Moon	co-production with Jaffe-Lansing Productions
April 13, 1984	Friday the 13th: The Final Chapter	
May 23, 1984	Indiana Jones and the Temple of Doom	distribution only; produced by Lucasfilm Ltd.
June 1, 1984	Star Trek III: The Search for Spock	
June 8, 1984	Top Secret!	co-production with Kingsmere Properties
July 20, 1984	Best Defense	
August 3, 1984	National Lampoon's Joy of Sex	
September 28, 1984	The River Rat	
October 19, 1984	Thief of Hearts	co-production with Don Simpson/Jerry Bruckheimer Films
October 26, 1984	Firstborn	co-production with Jaffe-Lansing Productions and Witt/Thomas Productions
November 21, 1984	Falling in Love	
December 5, 1984	Beverly Hills Cop	co-production with Don Simpson/Jerry Bruckheimer Films; Inducted into the National Film Registry in 2024

== 1985 ==
Release date	Title	Notes
February 8, 1985	Witness	Nominee for the Academy Award for Best Picture
March 22, 1985	Friday the 13th: A New Beginning	
March 29, 1985	King David	
May 10, 1985	Rustlers' Rhapsody	
June 14, 1985	D.A.R.Y.L.	North American distribution only; co-production with World Film Services
July 12, 1985	Explorers	
August 9, 1985	Summer Rental	co-production with The Brillstein Company
August 30, 1985	Compromising Positions (Note: Owned by Taurus Entertainment Company, with Shout! Studios handling distribution)	distribution only
October 11, 1985	Silver Bullet	North American distribution only; produced by Dino De Laurentiis Corporation
November 1, 1985	Macaroni	North American theatrical distribution only
November 8, 1985	That Was Then... This Is Now	North American distribution only; co-production with Media Ventures
December 4, 1985	Young Sherlock Holmes	co-production with Amblin Entertainment
December 13, 1985	Clue	co-production with PolyGram Pictures and Debra Hill Productions

== 1986 ==
Release date	Title	Notes
February 7, 1986	Lady Jane	British film
February 28, 1986	Pretty in Pink	
March 7, 1986	16 Days of Glory (Note: Owned by the International Olympic Committee, with distribution rights licensed to Janus Films and the Criterion Collection)	distribution only; produced by Cappy Productions
March 14, 1986	Gung Ho	
March 27, 1986	April Fool's Day	co-production with Hometown Films
May 2, 1986	Blue City	
May 9, 1986	Fire with Fire	
May 16, 1986	Top Gun	co-production with Don Simpson/Jerry Bruckheimer Films; Inducted into the National Film Registry in 2015
June 6, 1986	Raw Deal (Note: Owned by StudioCanal)	Canadian distribution only, produced by De Laurentiis Entertainment Group
June 11, 1986	Ferris Bueller's Day Off	Inducted into the National Film Registry in 2014
June 20, 1986	My Little Pony: The Movie (Note: Owned by Hasbro Entertainment, with Shout! Studios handling home video distribution)	Canadian distribution only, produced by De Laurentiis Entertainment Group
July 25, 1986	Heartburn	
July 25, 1986	Maximum Overdrive	Canadian distribution only, produced by De Laurentiis Entertainment Group
August 1, 1986	Friday the 13th Part VI: Jason Lives	co-production with Terror, Inc.
August 8, 1986	The Transformers: The Movie	Canadian distribution only, produced by De Laurentiis Entertainment Group
August 15, 1986	Manhunter (Note: Owned by StudioCanal, with home video rights licensed to Amazon MGM Studios (via MGM))	Canadian distribution only, produced by De Laurentiis Entertainment Group
August 22, 1986	The Whoopee Boys	
September 19, 1986	Blue Velvet	Canadian distribution only, produced by De Laurentiis Entertainment Group
September 19, 1986	Radioactive Dreams	Canadian distribution only, produced by De Laurentiis Entertainment Group
September 26, 1986	Crocodile Dundee	North American distribution only; produced by Rimfire Films
October 3, 1986	Children of a Lesser God	Nominee for the Academy Award for Best Picture
October 24, 1986	Trick or Treat	Canadian distribution only, produced by De Laurentiis Entertainment Group
November 7, 1986	Tai-Pan	Canadian distribution only, produced by De Laurentiis Entertainment Group
November 21, 1986	Body Slam (Note: Owned by Amazon MGM Studios (via MGM))	Canadian distribution only, produced by De Laurentiis Entertainment Group
November 26, 1986	Star Trek IV: The Voyage Home	
December 12, 1986	The Golden Child	co-production with Eddie Murphy Productions

== 1987 ==
Release date	Title	Notes
January 16, 1987	Critical Condition	
January 16, 1987	The Bedroom Window	Canadian distribution only, produced by De Laurentiis Entertainment Group
February 6, 1987	From the Hip	Canadian distribution only, produced by De Laurentiis Entertainment Group
February 27, 1987	Some Kind of Wonderful	co-production with Hughes Entertainment
April 10, 1987	Campus Man	North American distribution only; co-production with RKO Pictures
May 4, 1987	Evil Dead II	Canadian distribution only, produced by De Laurentiis Entertainment Group
May 8, 1987	Hot Pursuit	North American distribution only; produced by RKO Pictures
May 20, 1987	Beverly Hills Cop II	co-production with Don Simpson/Jerry Bruckheimer Films and Eddie Murphy Productions
June 3, 1987	The Untouchables	
July 22, 1987	Summer School	
August 7, 1987	Back to the Beach	
August 28, 1987	Hamburger Hill	North American theatrical and television distribution only; produced by RKO Pictures and Interaccess Film Distribution
September 18, 1987	Fatal Attraction	co-production with Jaffe/Lansing Productions; Nominee for the Academy Award for Best Picture
November 25, 1987	Planes, Trains and Automobiles	co-production with Hughes Entertainment
December 18, 1987	Eddie Murphy Raw	

== 1988 ==
Release date	Title	Notes
February 5, 1988	She's Having a Baby	co-production with Hughes Entertainment
March 25, 1988	A New Life	
April 15, 1988	Plain Clothes	
April 22, 1988	The Blue Iguana	North American distribution only; produced by PolyGram Movies and Propaganda Films
April 22, 1988	Permanent Record	
May 13, 1988	Friday the 13th Part VII: The New Blood	co-production with Friday Four, Inc.
May 25, 1988	Crocodile Dundee II (Note: International rights owned by Rimfire Films)	distribution outside Australia and New Zealand only; produced by Rimfire Films
June 10, 1988	The Presidio	
June 29, 1988	Coming to America	co-production with Landis/Folsey Productions
July 22, 1988	Big Top Pee-wee	
August 12, 1988	Tucker: The Man and His Dream (Note: Owned by American Zoetrope, with U.S. distribution rights split between Rialto Pictures for theatrical and Lionsgate for certain rights)	North America distribution only; produced by Lucasfilm Ltd. and Zoetrope Studios (uncredited)
October 14, 1988	The Accused	co-production with Jaffe/Lansing Productions
November 4, 1988	U2: Rattle and Hum	co-production with Midnight Films
November 11, 1988	Distant Thunder	
November 23, 1988	Scrooged	co-production with Mirage Productions
December 2, 1988	The Naked Gun: From the Files of Police Squad!	

== 1989 ==
Release date	Title	Notes
January 13, 1989	The Experts	
February 10, 1989	Cousins	
April 7, 1989	Major League	North American distribution only; co-production with Morgan Creek Productions and Mirage
April 21, 1989	Pet Sematary	
May 24, 1989	Indiana Jones and the Last Crusade	distribution only; produced by Lucasfilm Ltd.
June 9, 1989	Star Trek V: The Final Frontier	
July 28, 1989	Friday the 13th Part VIII: Jason Takes Manhattan	co-production with Horror, Inc.
August 18, 1989	Let It Ride	
August 30, 1989	Shirley Valentine	British film
September 22, 1989	Black Rain	
October 20, 1989	Fat Man and Little Boy	co-production with Lightmotive
November 17, 1989	Harlem Nights	co-production with Eddie Murphy Productions
December 15, 1989	We're No Angels	
