= List of Paramount Pictures films (2010–2019) =

The following is a list of films originally produced and/or distributed theatrically by Paramount Pictures and released in the 2010s.

== 2010 ==
Release date	Title	Notes
February 19, 2010	Shutter Island	co-production with Phoenix Pictures, Sikelia Productions and Appian Way Productions; rights licensed to Concorde Filmverleih for Germany and Austria, Medusa Film for Italy, Vertice Cine for Spain and Andorra, ACME Film for the Baltics and Cascade Film for the CIS
March 12, 2010	She's Out of My League	distribution only; produced by DreamWorks Pictures and Mosaic Media Group
March 18‚ 2010	Unresolved Sexual Tension	Spanish theatrical distribution only; co-production with Amiguetes Entertainment, Aragón Televisión, Bowfinger International Pictures, Instituto de Crédito Oficial (ICO), and Televisión Española (TVE)
March 26, 2010	How to Train Your Dragon	distribution only; produced by DreamWorks Animation (Note: Owned by Universal Pictures (via DreamWorks Animation)); Annie Award for Best Animated Feature; Nominated – Academy Award for Best Animated Feature; Nominated – BAFTA Award for Best Animated Film; Nominated – Critics' Choice Movie Award for Best Animated Feature; Nominated – Golden Globe Award for Best Animated Feature Film; Nominated – Producers Guild of America Award for Best Animated Motion Picture
April 24‚ 2010	Room in Rome	Spanish theatrical distribution only; co-production with Alicia Produce and Morena Films
May 7, 2010	Iron Man 2	distribution only; produced by Marvel Studios (Note: Owned by Disney (via Marvel Studios) with Walt Disney Studios Motion Pictures currently handling distribution) and Fairview Entertainment; rights licensed to Concorde Filmverleih for Germany and Austria
May 21, 2010	Shrek Forever After	distribution only; produced by DreamWorks Animation
June 4, 2010	Ondine	U.K. and Irish distribution only; produced by Wayfare Entertainment, Octagon Films and Little Wave Productions
July 1, 2010	The Last Airbender	co-production with Nickelodeon Movies, Blinding Edge Pictures and the Kennedy/Marshall Company
July 8, 2010	The Loved Ones	North American distribution with Insurge Pictures only; produced by Screen Australia, Omnilab Media, Ambience Entertainment and Film Victoria
July 30, 2010	Dinner for Schmucks	distribution outside India only; co-production with DreamWorks Pictures, Spyglass Entertainment, (Note: Co-owned by Content Partners LLC) Parkes/MacDonald, Everyman Pictures and Reliance Entertainment
September 2, 2010	Tomorrow, When the War Began	distribution in the U.K., Ireland, Australia, New Zealand, Scandinavia, Russia, the Baltics, Mozambique and Portugal only; produced by Ambience Entertainment and Omnilab Media
October 15, 2010	Jackass 3D	co-production with MTV Films and Dickhouse Productions
October 22, 2010	Paranormal Activity 2	co-production with Blumhouse Productions, Solana Films and Room 101, Inc.
November 5, 2010	Megamind	distribution only; produced by DreamWorks Animation and PDI/DreamWorks
November 10, 2010	Morning Glory	co-production with Bad Robot
November 13‚ 2010	Ghost: Mouichido Dakishimetai	Japanese-Korean film; co-distribution with Shochiku only; co-production with Shochiku and Oz Company
December 17, 2010	The Fighter	U.S. distribution excluding television and U.K. and Irish theatrical co-distribution with Momentum Pictures only; produced by Relativity Media, (Note: Co-owned by Vine Alternative Investments (via Manchester Library Company)) The Weinstein Company, (Note: International rights owned by Lionsgate) Mandeville Films and Closest to the Hole Productions; Nominated – Academy Award for Best Picture; Nominated – Critics' Choice Movie Award for Best Picture; Nominated – Golden Globe Award for Best Motion Picture – Drama; Nominated – Producers Guild of America Award for Best Theatrical Motion Picture
December 22, 2010	Little Fockers	international distribution only; co-production with Universal Pictures, Relativity Media, Tribeca Productions and Everyman Pictures
December 22, 2010	True Grit	co-production with Skydance Productions, Scott Rudin Productions and Mike Zoss Productions; Nominated – Academy Award for Best Picture; Nominated – BAFTA Award for Best Film; Nominated – Critics' Choice Movie Award for Best Picture; Nominated – Producers Guild of America Award for Best Theatrical Motion Picture

== 2011 ==
Release date	Title	Notes
January 21, 2011	No Strings Attached	distribution only; produced by DW Studios, the Montecito Picture Company, Spyglass Entertainment, Cold Spring Pictures, (Note: Co-owned by Revolution Studios) Handsomecharlie Films and Katalyst Films
February 11, 2011	Justin Bieber: Never Say Never	distribution only; produced by Insurge Pictures, MTV Films, Scooter Braun Films, L.A Reid Media, AEG Live and Island Records
March 4, 2011	Rango	Winner of the Academy Award for Best Animated Feature; Nominee for the Golden Globe Award for Best Animated Feature Film co-production with Nickelodeon Movies, Blind Wink, GK Films and Industrial Light & Magic
May 6, 2011	Thor	distribution only; produced by Marvel Studios
May 26, 2011	Kung Fu Panda 2	Nominee for the Academy Award for Best Animated Feature distribution only; produced by DreamWorks Animation
June 10, 2011	Super 8	co-production with Amblin Entertainment and Bad Robot
June 29, 2011	Transformers: Dark of the Moon	co-production with Hasbro and Di Bonaventura Pictures
July 22, 2011	Captain America: The First Avenger	distribution only; produced by Marvel Studios
July 29, 2011	Cowboys & Aliens	international distribution outside India only; produced by DreamWorks Pictures, Universal Pictures, Reliance Entertainment, Relativity Media, Imagine Entertainment, K/O Paper Products, Fairview Entertainment and Platinum Studios
September 22, 2011	Hell	German film; distribution only; produced by Caligari Film, Vega Film and SevenPictures Film
October 14, 2011	Footloose	co-production with Spyglass Entertainment, MTV Films, Dylan Sellers Productions, Zadan/Meron Productions and Weston Pictures
October 21, 2011	Paranormal Activity 3	co-production with Blumhouse Productions, Solana Films and Room 101, Inc.
October 28, 2011	Eva	Spanish film; distribution only; produced by Escándalo Films and Ran Entertainment
October 28, 2011	Puss in Boots	Nominee for the Academy Award for Best Animated Feature distribution only; produced by DreamWorks Animation
November 23, 2011	Hugo	Nominee for the Academy Award for Best Picture distribution outside the U.K., Ireland, France, Switzerland, Italy, the Middle East and Turkey only; produced by GK Films and Infinitum Nihil
December 9, 2011	Young Adult	distribution only; produced by Mandate Pictures, Mr. Mudd, Right of Way Films and Denver and Delilah Productions
December 16, 2011	Mission: Impossible – Ghost Protocol	co-production with Skydance Productions, TC Productions and Bad Robot
December 21, 2011	The Adventures of Tintin	Winner of the Golden Globe Award for Best Animated Feature distribution in North America, the U.K., Ireland, Australia, New Zealand, South Africa and Asia excluding India, Japan and Korea only; co-production with Columbia Pictures, Nickelodeon Movies, Amblin Entertainment, Hemisphere Media Capital, The Kennedy/Marshall Company and WingNut Films

== 2012 ==
Release date	Title	Notes
January 6, 2012	The Devil Inside	distribution only; produced by Insurge Pictures and Prototype Productions
March 9, 2012	A Thousand Words	distribution only; produced by DreamWorks Pictures, Work After Midnight Films and Saturn Films
March 29, 2012	Russian Disco	German film; distribution only; produced by Black Forest Films and SevenPictures Film
May 4, 2012	The Avengers	associate credit only; produced by Marvel Studios; distributed by Walt Disney Studios Motion Pictures (Note: Released in international theaters on April 25, 2012.)
May 16, 2012	The Dictator	co-production with Four by Two Films, Berg/Mandel/Schaffer Productions and Scott Rudin Productions
June 8, 2012	Madagascar 3: Europe's Most Wanted	distribution only; produced by DreamWorks Animation and PDI/DreamWorks
July 5, 2012	Katy Perry: Part of Me	distribution only; produced by Insurge Pictures, MTV Films and Imagine Entertainment
August 24, 2012	Shadow Dancer	U.K. and Irish distribution only; produced by BBC Films, Irish Film Board, British Film Institute, Element Pictures, Wild Bunch, UKFS and Unanimous Entertainment
August 31, 2012	Tad, The Lost Explorer	Spain distribution; co-production with Telecinco Cinema, Ikiru Films, ElToro Pictures, Lightbox Entertainment and Telefónica Studios
October 19, 2012	Paranormal Activity 4	co-production with Blumhouse Productions, Solana Films and Room 101. Inc.
October 26, 2012	Fun Size	co-production with Nickelodeon Movies, Anonymous Content and Fake Empire
November 2, 2012	Flight	co-production with ImageMovers, Parkes/MacDonald Productions and Image Nation; rights licensed to StudioCanal for Germany and Austria, Impuls Pictures for Switzerland and Tripictures for Spain and Andorra
November 21, 2012	Rise of the Guardians	distribution only; produced by DreamWorks Animation; last DreamWorks Animation film to be distributed by Paramount Pictures
December 19, 2012	The Guilt Trip	co-production with Skydance Productions and Michaels/Goldwyn Films
December 21, 2012	Cirque du Soleil: Worlds Away	distribution only; produced by Cirque du Soleil Productions, Reel FX, Strange Weather Films and Cameron Pace Group
December 21, 2012	Jack Reacher	co-production with Skydance Productions, TC Productions and Mutual Film Company (uncredited)

== 2013 ==
Release date	Title	Notes
January 25, 2013	Hansel & Gretel: Witch Hunters	distribution in all media excluding international digital and television outside Scandinavia only; co-production with Metro-Goldwyn-Mayer, MTV Films and Gary Sanchez Productions
March 28, 2013	G.I. Joe: Retaliation	distribution in all media excluding international digital and television only; co-production with Metro-Goldwyn-Mayer, Skydance Productions, Hasbro and di Bonaventura Pictures
April 26, 2013	Pain & Gain	co-production with De Line Pictures; rights licensed to Paradise Group for Russia, Aurora Films for Ukraine and BestFilm for the Baltics
May 3, 2013	Iron Man 3	studio credit only; produced by Marvel Studios and DMG Entertainment; distributed by Walt Disney Studios Motion Pictures worldwide excluding Germany, Austria, China and home media and television in Switzerland, Luxembourg, Liechtenstein and Alto Adige (Note: Released in international theaters on April 24, 2013.)
May 15, 2013	Star Trek Into Darkness	co-production with Skydance Productions, Bad Robot and K/O Paper Products
June 21, 2013	World War Z	distribution outside Japan and Korea only; co-production with Skydance Productions, Hemisphere Media Capital, GK Films, Plan B Entertainment and 2DUX²
October 25, 2013	Jackass Presents: Bad Grandpa	co-production with MTV Films and Dickhouse Productions
December 18, 2013	Anchorman 2: The Legend Continues	co-production with Gary Sanchez Productions and Apatow Productions
December 25, 2013	The Wolf of Wall Street	Nominee for the Academy Award for Best Picture. North American and Japanese distribution only; produced by Red Granite Pictures, Appian Way Productions, Sikelia Productions and Emjag Productions
December 27, 2013	Labor Day	co-production with Indian Paintbrush, Right of Way Productions and Mr. Mudd

== 2014 ==
Release date	Title	Notes
January 3, 2014	Paranormal Activity: The Marked Ones	co-production with Blumhouse Productions, Solana Films and Room 101. Inc.
January 17, 2014	Jack Ryan: Shadow Recruit	co-production with Skydance Productions, di Bonaventura Pictures and Mace Neufeld Productions
March 28, 2014	Noah	distribution in all media excluding international digital, streaming and television only; co-production with Regency Enterprises and Protozoa Pictures
June 27, 2014	Transformers: Age of Extinction	co-production with Hasbro Studios and di Bonaventura Pictures
July 25, 2014	Hercules	distribution in all media excluding digital and television outside Scandinavia, Portugal, Poland, Hungary, Romania, Bulgaria, the Czech Republic, Slovakia, the Middle East and Israel only; produced by Metro-Goldwyn-Mayer, Flynn Picture Company, RatPac Entertainment and Radical Pictures
August 8, 2014	Teenage Mutant Ninja Turtles	co-production with Nickelodeon Movies, Platinum Dunes, Gama Entertainment, Mednick Productions and Heavy Metal Productions
October 3, 2014	Men, Women & Children	co-production with Right of Way Films
November 5, 2014	Interstellar (Note: Skydance now owns worldwide rights to this film, having acquired Paramount Global in 2025 and Warner Bros. Discovery in 2026.)	North American distribution only; co-production with Warner Bros. Pictures, Legendary Pictures, Syncopy Inc. and Lynda Obst Productions
December 12, 2014	Top Five	distribution only; produced by IAC Films and Scott Rudin Productions
December 25, 2014	The Gambler	co-production with Chartoff/Winkler Productions, Closest to the Hole Productions and Leverage Entertainment
December 25, 2014	Selma	Nominee for the Academy Award for Best Picture. North American distribution only; produced by Pathé, Harpo Films, Plan B Entertainment, Cloud Eight Films and Ingenious Media

== 2015 ==
Release date	Title	Notes
January 30, 2015	Project Almanac	distribution only; produced by Insurge Pictures, MTV Films and Platinum Dunes
February 6, 2015	The SpongeBob Movie: Sponge Out of Water	co-production with Paramount Animation, Nickelodeon Movies and United Plankton Pictures
February 20, 2015	Hot Tub Time Machine 2	distribution in all media excluding digital and television outside Scandinavia and the Middle East only; produced by Metro-Goldwyn-Mayer and Panay Films
May 15, 2015	Area 51	distribution only; produced by Insurge Pictures, Incentive Filmed Entertainment, Blumhouse Productions, Solana Films, Room 101, Inc. and IM Global
May 22, 2015	Drunk Wedding	distribution only; produced by Insurge Pictures
June 30, 2015	Staten Island Summer	distribution only; produced by Insurge Pictures and Michaels-Goldwyn
July 1, 2015	Terminator Genisys	distribution outside China and Korea on home media only; co-production with Skydance Productions and Annapurna Pictures
July 31, 2015	Mission: Impossible – Rogue Nation	co-production with Skydance Productions, TC Productions, Bad Robot, Odin, China Movie Channel and Alibaba Pictures
August 25, 2015	Capture the Flag	Spanish film; co-production with 4 Cats Pictures, Lightbox Entertainment, Los Rockets AIE La Película, Telefónica Studios, Ikiru Films and Mediaset Spain
September 18, 2015	Captive	distribution only; produced by BN Films, Brightside Entertainment, 1019 Entertainment and Yoruba Saxon Productions
October 23, 2015	Paranormal Activity: The Ghost Dimension	co-production with Blumhouse Productions, Solana Films and Room 101, Inc.
October 30, 2015	Scouts Guide to the Zombie Apocalypse	co-production with Broken Road Productions
December 11, 2015	The Big Short	Nominee for the Academy Award for Best Picture. Nominee for the Golden Globe Award for Best Motion Picture – Musical or Comedy. distribution in all media excluding international digital and television only; co-production with Regency Enterprises and Plan B Entertainment
December 25, 2015	Daddy's Home	co-production with Red Granite Pictures and Gary Sanchez Productions
December 30, 2015	Anomalisa	Nominee for the Academy Award for Best Animated Feature distribution outside the U.K., Ireland, the Middle East and Hong Kong only; produced by Starburns Industries

== 2016 ==
Release date	Title	Notes
January 15, 2016	13 Hours: The Secret Soldiers of Benghazi	co-production with 3 Arts Entertainment and Bay Films
February 12, 2016	Zoolander 2	co-production with Red Hour Productions and Scott Rudin Productions
March 4, 2016	Whiskey Tango Foxtrot	co-production with Broadway Video and Little Stranger
March 11, 2016	10 Cloverfield Lane	co-production with Bad Robot
March 30, 2016	Everybody Wants Some!!	North American distribution only; produced by Annapurna Pictures and Detour Filmproduction
June 3, 2016	Teenage Mutant Ninja Turtles: Out of the Shadows	co-production with Nickelodeon Movies, Platinum Dunes, Gama Entertainment, Mednick Productions, Smithrowe Entertainment, China Movie Media Group and Alibaba Pictures
July 22, 2016	Star Trek Beyond	co-production with Skydance Media, Bad Robot, Sneaky Shark Productions, Perfect Storm Entertainment, K/O Paper Products, Alibaba Pictures and Huahua Media
August 5, 2016	The Little Prince	North American and French distribution under Paramount Animation only; produced by ON Animation Studios, Lucky Red and Orange Studio; co-distributed by Netflix in North America
August 12, 2016	Florence Foster Jenkins	U.S. distribution only; produced by Pathé, BBC Films, Canal+, Ciné+ and Qwerty Films
August 19, 2016	Ben-Hur	distribution in all media excluding digital and television outside Scandinavia, Portugal, Poland, Hungary, Romania, Bulgaria, the Czech Republic, Slovakia, the Middle East and Israel only; produced by Metro-Goldwyn-Mayer, The Sean Daniel Company and Lightworkers Media
August 26, 2016	The Intervention	co-distribution with Samuel Goldwyn Films only
September 9, 2016	Brother Nature	distribution only; produced by Insurge Pictures and Broadway Video; distributed by Samuel Goldwyn Films
September 23, 2016	Goat	co-distribution with The Film Arcade only
October 21, 2016	Jack Reacher: Never Go Back	co-production with Skydance Media and TC Productions
November 11, 2016	Arrival	North American and Chinese distribution only; produced by FilmNation Entertainment, Lava Bear Films and 21 Laps Entertainment
November 23, 2016	Allied	co-production with GK Films, ImageMovers and Huahua Media
December 9, 2016	Office Christmas Party	distribution in North and Latin America, Italy, Russia, Japan, Hong Kong, Taiwan, Singapore, Thailand, Malaysia and the Philippines only; produced by DreamWorks Pictures, Reliance Entertainment, Bluegrass Films and Entertainment 360
December 16, 2016	Fences	Nominee for the Academy Award for Best Picture co-production with Bron Creative, Macro Media, Creative Wealth Media Finance and Scott Rudin Productions
December 23, 2016	Silence	North American distribution only; produced by SharpSword Films, AI Film, CatchPlay, IM Global, Verdi Productions, Waypoint Entertainment, Sikelia Productions, Fábrica de Cine, Cecchi Gori Pictures and Emmett/Furla/Oasis Films

== 2017 ==
Release date	Title	Notes
January 13, 2017	Monster Trucks	co-production with Paramount Animation, Nickelodeon Movies and Disruption Entertainment
January 20, 2017	XXX: Return of Xander Cage	co-production with Revolution Studios, Roth Kirschenbaum Films and One Race Films
February 3, 2017	Rings	distribution outside Japan only; co-production with Parkes + MacDonald Productions
March 31, 2017	Ghost in the Shell	distribution outside former Yugoslavia, Albania, the Baltics, the Middle East and India only; co-production with DreamWorks Pictures, Reliance Entertainment, Amblin Partners, Arad Productions and Steven Paul Productions
May 25, 2017	Baywatch	co-production with Uncharted, The Montecito Picture Company, Flynn Picture Company, Fremantle Productions, Contrafilm, Vinson Films and Seven Bucks Productions
June 21, 2017	Transformers: The Last Knight	co-production with Hasbro Studios and Di Bonaventura Pictures
July 28, 2017	An Inconvenient Sequel: Truth to Power	co-production with Participant Media and Actual Films
August 25, 2017	Tad the Lost Explorer and the Secret of King Midas	Spanish film; distribution only; co-production with Telecinco Cinema, Ikiru Films, ElToro Pictures, Lightbox Entertainment and Telefónica Studios
September 1, 2017	Tulip Fever	studio credit only; co-production with Worldview Entertainment and Ruby Films; distributed by The Weinstein Company
September 15, 2017	Mother!	co-production with Protozoa Pictures
October 20, 2017	Same Kind of Different as Me	co-production with Disruption Entertainment; distributed theatrically by Pure Flix Entertainment in the U.S.
October 27, 2017	Suburbicon	U.S. distribution only; produced by Black Bear Pictures, Dark Castle Entertainment, Bloom Media and Smokehouse Pictures
November 10, 2017	Daddy's Home 2	co-production with Gary Sanchez Productions
December 22, 2017	Downsizing	co-production with Ad Hominem Enterprises and Gran Via Productions

== 2018 ==
Release date	Title	Notes
January 25, 2018	Padmaavat	Indian film; theatrical co-distribution in the U.K., Ireland, Australia, New Zealand and the Middle East with Paramount Classics only; produced by Bhansali Productions and Viacom18 Motion Pictures
February 4, 2018	The Cloverfield Paradox	co-production with Bad Robot; distributed by Netflix
February 23, 2018	Annihilation	North American and Chinese distribution only; co-production with Skydance Media, Scott Rudin Productions and DNA Films
March 23, 2018	Sherlock Gnomes	distribution in all media excluding international digital and television outside Scandinavia, Portugal, Mozambique, the Middle East and China only; co-production with Paramount Animation, Metro-Goldwyn-Mayer and Rocket Pictures
April 6, 2018	A Quiet Place	co-production with Platinum Dunes
May 18, 2018	Book Club	North American, U.K., Irish and French distribution only; produced by June Pictures, Endeavor Content and Apartment Stories Productions
June 1, 2018	Action Point	co-production with Gerber Pictures, Hello Junior and Dickhouse Productions
July 27, 2018	Mission: Impossible – Fallout	co-production with Skydance Media, TC Productions and Bad Robot
August 31, 2018	The Footbolistics	Spanish distribution only; co-production with Atresmedia Cine, Wandermoon, Chester Media and Los Futbolisimos AIE
November 2, 2018	Nobody's Fool	co-production with Paramount Players, Tyler Perry Studios and BET Films
November 9, 2018	Overlord	co-production with Bad Robot; rights licensed to Presidio for Japan
November 16, 2018	Instant Family	co-production with Closest to the Hole Productions, Leverage Entertainment and Two Grown Men Productions
December 21, 2018	Bumblebee	co-production with Allspark Pictures, Hasbro Studios, Tencent Pictures, Di Bonaventura Pictures and Bay Films

== 2019 ==
Release date	Title	Notes
February 8, 2019	What Men Want	co-production with Paramount Players, BET Films and Will Packer Productions
March 15, 2019	Wonder Park	co-production with Paramount Animation, Nickelodeon Movies and Ilion Animation Studios
April 5, 2019	Pet Sematary	co-production with Di Bonaventura Pictures
May 31, 2019	Rocketman	co-production with New Republic Pictures, Marv Films and Rocket Pictures
July 12, 2019	Crawl	co-production with Raimi Productions and Fire Axe Pictures
August 9, 2019	Dora and the Lost City of Gold	co-production with Paramount Players, Nickelodeon Movies, Walden Media, MRC and Burr! Productions; rights licensed to Impuls Pictures for Switzerland
October 11, 2019	Gemini Man	distribution outside China only; co-production with Skydance Media, Jerry Bruckheimer Films, Fosun Pictures and Alibaba Pictures
October 18, 2019	Eli	co-production with Paramount Players, MTV Films and Intrepid Pictures; distributed by Netflix
November 1, 2019	Terminator: Dark Fate	North American distribution only; co-production with 20th Century Fox, Skydance, Tencent Pictures and Lightstorm Entertainment
November 8, 2019	Playing with Fire	co-production with Paramount Players, Nickelodeon Movies, Walden Media and Broken Road Productions
November 15, 2019	If I Were Rich	Spanish distribution only; co-production with Telecinco Cinema, Mogambo, Cikstul, Movistar+, Si Yo Fuera and Think Studio
November 22, 2019	Blue Story	U.K. and Irish distribution only; produced by BBC Films, Joi Productions and DJ Films

== See also ==
- Paramount Pictures
- Category:Lists of films by studio

== Notes ==
Release notes
