= List of Paramount Pictures films (2000–2009) =

The following is a list of films originally produced and/or distributed theatrically by Paramount Pictures and released in the 2000s.

== 2000 ==
| Release Date | Title | Notes |
|---|---|---|
| February 11, 2000 | Snow Day | co-production with Nickelodeon Movies |
| February 23, 2000 | Wonder Boys | North American distribution only; co-production with Mutual Film Company, Scott Rudin Productions and Curtis Hanson Productions |
| March 3, 2000 | The Next Best Thing | North American distribution only; produced by Lakeshore Entertainment |
| April 7, 2000 | Rules of Engagement (Note: Co-owned by Content Partners, LLC) | North American, Brazilian, Argentine, U.K., Irish, French and Swiss distribution only; co-production with Seven Arts Pictures, the Zanuck Company and Scott Rudin Productions |
| May 24, 2000 | Mission: Impossible 2 | co-production with Cruise/Wagner Productions |
| June 16, 2000 | Shaft | co-production with Scott Rudin Productions and New Deal; rights licensed to 01 Distribution for Italy and Filmax for Spain |
| August 11, 2000 | Bless the Child | North American distribution only; co-production with Icon Productions and Mace Neufeld Productions |
| August 18, 2000 | The Original Kings of Comedy | distribution only; produced by MTV Films, Latham Entertainment Group and 40 Acres and a Mule Filmworks |
| October 13, 2000 | The Ladies Man | co-production with SNL Studios and Broadway Video |
| October 27, 2000 | Lucky Numbers | distribution outside Latin American pay and free television, Europe and Africa only; co-production with StudioCanal, Mad Chance Productions and Alphaville |
| November 17, 2000 | Rugrats in Paris: The Movie | co-production with Nickelodeon Movies and Klasky Csupo |
| December 15, 2000 | What Women Want | North American distribution only; produced by Icon Productions and Wind Dancer Films |

== 2001 ==
| Release Date | Title | Notes |
|---|---|---|
| January 12, 2001 | Save the Last Dance | co-production with MTV Films and Cort/Madden Productions; rights licensed to Eagle Pictures for Italy and Toho-Towa for Japan |
| February 16, 2001 | Down to Earth (Note: Co-owned by Alcon Entertainment) | distribution outside Australia, New Zealand, Greece, Cyprus and Singapore only; co-production with Village Roadshow Pictures, NPV Entertainment, Alphaville Films and 3 Arts Entertainment |
| March 16, 2001 | Enemy at the Gates | distribution outside the U.K., Ireland, France, Australia, New Zealand, Greece, Cyprus, Germany, Austria, Switzerland, Belgium, Luxembourg, Italy, Spain, Andorra and Japan only; produced by Mandalay Pictures and Repérage Films |
| April 6, 2001 | Along Came a Spider | co-production with David Brown Productions, Phase 1 Productions and Revelations Entertainment; rights licensed to Eagle Pictures for Italy and Toho-Towa for Japan |
| April 20, 2001 | Crocodile Dundee in Los Angeles | North American distribution only; produced by Silver Lion Pictures and Guy Hands |
| June 15, 2001 | Lara Croft: Tomb Raider | distribution outside U.K. free television, Germany, Austria, Switzerland, Italy, Japan and Korea only; co-production with Mutual Film Company, BBC Films, Tele-Munchen Gruppe, Toho-Towa, Lawrence Gordon Productions and Eidos Interactive |
| June 29, 2001 | Pootie Tang | co-production with MTV Films, Chris Rock Productions, Alphaville Films, 3 Arts Entertainment and HBO Downtown Productions |
| July 13, 2001 | The Score | distribution outside the U.K., Ireland, France, Australia, New Zealand, Greece, Cyprus, Germany, Austria, Switzerland, Italy, Spain, Andorra and Japan only; produced by Mandalay Pictures, Horseshoe Bay Productions and Lee Rich Productions |
| August 17, 2001 | Rat Race | North American, Australian and New Zealand distribution only; co-production with Fireworks Pictures, Alphaville Films and Zucker Productions |
| September 14, 2001 | Hardball | distribution in North America, the U.K., Ireland, Australia, New Zealand, Germany, Austria, France and the Benelux only; co-production with Fireworks Pictures, Nides/McCormick Productions and Tollin/Robbins Productions |
| September 28, 2001 | Zoolander | distribution outside Australia, New Zealand, Greece, Cyprus and Singapore only; co-production with Village Roadshow Pictures, VH1 Films, NPV Entertainment, Scott Rudin Productions and Red Hour Productions |
| November 2, 2001 | Domestic Disturbance | co-production with De Line Pictures; international rights outside the U.K., Ireland, Australia, New Zealand, France, Germany, Austria, Switzerland, Slovenia and Japan licensed to Lakeshore International |
| December 14, 2001 | Vanilla Sky | co-production with Cruise/Wagner Productions, Vinyl Films, Summit Entertainment and Artisan Entertainment |
| December 21, 2001 | Jimmy Neutron: Boy Genius | co-production with Nickelodeon Movies, DNA Productions and O Entertainment; Nominee for the Academy Award for Best Animated Feature |

== 2002 ==
| Release Date | Title | Notes |
|---|---|---|
| January 11, 2002 | Orange County | co-production with MTV Films and Scott Rudin Productions |
| February 15, 2002 | Crossroads (Note: Owned by Sony Music Entertainment and RCA Records; MTV Films however retains its credit) | North American distribution with MTV Films only; produced by Zomba Films |
| March 1, 2002 | We Were Soldiers | North American distribution only; co-production with Icon Productions and Wheelhouse Entertainment |
| March 29, 2002 | Clockstoppers | co-production with Nickelodeon Movies and Valhalla Motion Pictures |
| April 5, 2002 | Lucky Break | North American distribution only; co-acquisition with Miramax Films; produced by FilmFour, Senator Film and Fragile Films |
| April 12, 2002 | Changing Lanes | co-production with Scott Rudin Productions; rights licensed to Eagle Pictures for Italy and Tripictures for Spain |
| May 31, 2002 | The Sum of All Fears | co-production with Mace Neufeld Productions; rights licensed to Toho-Towa for Japan |
| June 28, 2002 | Hey Arnold!: The Movie | co-production with Nickelodeon Movies and Snee-Oosh, Inc. |
| July 19, 2002 | K-19: The Widowmaker (Note: Co-owned by Library Rights Company (UK), Ltd. and Zelus Film Holding Company, LLC, with distribution rights currently licensed to Resurgence Media Group, which has sub-licensed North American rights to Shout! Studios; Paramount retains distribution rights in its share of international territories) | distribution in North and Latin America, the U.K., Ireland, Australia, New Zealand, France, the Benelux, Indonesia, Malaysia, the Philippines and Singapore only; produced by Intermedia Films, National Geographic Society, Palomar Pictures, First Light Productions and IMF |
| August 2, 2002 | Martin Lawrence Live: Runteldat | distribution only; produced by MTV Films and Runteldat Entertainment |
| August 23, 2002 | Serving Sara (Note: U.S. distribution rights currently owned by Shout! Studios) | North American distribution only; produced by Mandalay Pictures, Illusion Entertainment and Halsted Pictures |
| September 20, 2002 | The Four Feathers (Note: Paramount now owns worldwide rights to this film, having acquired a 49% stake in Miramax in 2020) | North American distribution only; co-production with Miramax Films and Jaffilms |
| October 18, 2002 | Abandon | North American distribution only; co-production with Spyglass Entertainment and Lynda Obst Productions |
| October 25, 2002 | Jackass: The Movie | co-production with MTV Films, Dickhouse Productions and Lynch Siderow Productions |
| November 27, 2002 | Extreme Ops | distribution in North America, the U.K., Ireland, Australia, New Zealand, Germany and Austria only; produced by MDP Worldwide, Diamant/Cohen Productions, Apollomedia, Extreme Productions and The Carousell Picture Company |
| December 13, 2002 | Star Trek: Nemesis | co-production with Rick Berman Productions |
| December 20, 2002 | Narc | distribution in North America, the U.K., Ireland, Australia, New Zealand, Spain, Andorra and Japan only; co-acquisition with Lions Gate Films and Cruise/Wagner Productions; produced by Splendid Pictures, Emmett/Furla Films and Tiara Blu Films |
| December 20, 2002 | The Wild Thornberrys Movie | co-production with Nickelodeon Movies and Klasky Csupo |
| December 27, 2002 | The Hours | North American distribution only; co-production with Miramax Films, Scott Rudin Productions and Robert Fox Productions; Nominee for the Academy Award for Best Picture; Inducted into the National Film Registry in 2025 |

== 2003 ==
| Release Date | Title | Notes |
|---|---|---|
| February 7, 2003 | How to Lose a Guy in 10 Days | co-production with Evans/Peters/Obst Productions |
| March 14, 2003 | The Hunted | North American distribution only; co-production with Lakeshore Entertainment and Alphaville Films |
| March 28, 2003 | The Core | co-production with Foster/Layne/Bailey Productions; rights licensed to 01 Distribution for Italy and GAGA-Humax for Japan |
| April 11, 2003 | Better Luck Tomorrow | distribution with MTV Films only; produced by Hudson River Entertainment, Cherry Sky Films, Day O Productions and Trailing Johnson Productions |
| May 30, 2003 | The Italian Job | co-production with De Line Pictures; rights licensed to Concorde Filmverleih for Germany and Austria and Herald Film Company for Japan |
| June 13, 2003 | Rugrats Go Wild | co-production with Nickelodeon Movies and Klasky Csupo |
| July 25, 2003 | Lara Croft: Tomb Raider – The Cradle of Life | distribution outside U.K. free television, Germany, Austria, Switzerland, Italy, Turkey, Japan and Korea only; co-production with Mutual Film Company, BBC Films, Tele-Munchen Gruppe, Toho-Towa, Lawrence Gordon Productions and Eidos Interactive |
| August 22, 2003 | Marci X | co-production with Scott Rudin Productions |
| September 5, 2003 | Dickie Roberts: Former Child Star | co-production with Happy Madison Productions |
| September 19, 2003 | The Fighting Temptations | co-production with MTV Films and Handprint Films |
| October 3, 2003 | School of Rock | co-production with Scott Rudin Productions and Black & White Productions |
| October 24, 2003 | Beyond Borders | distribution outside the U.K., Ireland, France, Australia, New Zealand, Greece, Cyprus, Italy, Spain, Andorra and Japan only; produced by Mandalay Pictures and Camelot Pictures |
| November 14, 2003 | Tupac: Resurrection | co-production with MTV Films and Amaru Entertainment |
| November 26, 2003 | Timeline | distribution outside the U.K., Ireland, Germany, Austria, Switzerland, Italy, Spain, Andorra, Turkey, Japan and Korea only; co-production with Mutual Film Company, Cobalt Media Group, the Donners' Company and Artists Production Group |
| December 25, 2003 | Paycheck (Note: Paramount now owns worldwide rights to this film as a result of its brief ownership of DreamWorks Pictures from 2006–2008.) | North American distribution only; co-production with DreamWorks Pictures, Davis Entertainment, Lion Rock Productions and Solomon/Hackett Productions |

== 2004 ==
| Release Date | Title | Notes |
|---|---|---|
| January 30, 2004 | The Perfect Score | co-production with MTV Films, Roger Birnbaum Productions and Tollin/Robbins Productions |
| February 20, 2004 | Against the Ropes | co-production with Cort/Madden Productions |
| February 27, 2004 | Twisted (Note: Paramount has since reclaimed international rights to this film) | distribution in North and Latin America, the U.K., Ireland, Australia, New Zealand, Germany, Austria, Greece, Cyprus and Taiwan only; produced by Intertainment AG and Kopelson Entertainment |
| April 2, 2004 | The Prince & Me | North American, French and Japanese distribution only; co-production with Lions Gate Films and Sobini Films |
| April 30, 2004 | Mean Girls | co-production with Broadway Video |
| June 11, 2004 | The Stepford Wives | North American distribution only; co-production with DreamWorks Pictures, Scott Rudin Productions and De Line Pictures |
| July 30, 2004 | The Manchurian Candidate | co-production with Scott Rudin Productions and Clinica Estetico |
| August 6, 2004 | Collateral | international distribution only; co-production with DreamWorks Pictures, Parkes/MacDonald Productions, Edge City and Forward Pass |
| August 20, 2004 | Without a Paddle | co-production with De Line Pictures |
| August 27, 2004 | Napoleon Dynamite | international distribution outside Latin America, Italy, Switzerland, Turkey and Japan with MTV Films only; co-acquisition with Fox Searchlight Pictures; produced by Napoleon Pictures |
| August 27, 2004 | Suspect Zero | North American distribution only; produced by Intermedia Films, Lakeshore Entertainment and Cruise/Wagner Productions |
| September 17, 2004 | Sky Captain and the World of Tomorrow | distribution in North America, the U.K., Ireland, Australia, New Zealand, France, Germany, Austria and India only; produced by Brooklyn Films II, Riff Raff, Blue Flower and Filmauro |
| October 15, 2004 | Team America: World Police | co-production with Scott Rudin Productions |
| November 5, 2004 | Alfie | co-production with Shyer/Pope Films |
| November 19, 2004 | The SpongeBob SquarePants Movie | co-production with Nickelodeon Movies and United Plankton Pictures |
| December 17, 2004 | Lemony Snicket's A Series of Unfortunate Events | North American distribution only; co-production with DreamWorks Pictures, Nickelodeon Movies and Parkes/MacDonald Productions |

== 2005 ==
| Release Date | Title | Notes |
|---|---|---|
| January 14, 2005 | Coach Carter | co-production with MTV Films and Tollin/Robbins Productions |
| April 8, 2005 | Sahara | distribution in North America, the U.K., Ireland, Australia, New Zealand, South Africa, Italy, Spain and Andorra only; produced by Bristol Bay Productions, Baldwin Entertainment Group and Kanzaman Productions |
| May 27, 2005 | The Longest Yard | North American distribution only; co-production with Columbia Pictures, MTV Films, Happy Madison Productions and Callahan Filmworks |
| June 10, 2005 | The Honeymooners | co-production with Deep River Productions |
| June 29, 2005 | War of the Worlds | worldwide theatrical and international home media distribution only; co-production with DreamWorks Pictures, Amblin Entertainment and Cruise/Wagner Productions |
| July 8, 2005 | Murderball | studio credit only; produced by MTV Films, A&E IndieFilms, Eat Film Productions and Participant Productions; distributed by TH!NKFilm |
| July 22, 2005 | Bad News Bears | co-production with Media Talent Group and Detour Filmproduction |
| August 12, 2005 | Four Brothers | co-production with Di Bonaventura Pictures |
| October 14, 2005 | Elizabethtown | co-production with Cruise/Wagner Productions and Vinyl Films |
| October 28, 2005 | The Weather Man | distribution only; produced by Escape Artists; rights licensed to Momentum Pictures for the U.K. and Ireland, Eagle Pictures for Italy and Nordisk Film for Scandinavia |
| November 9, 2005 | Get Rich or Die Tryin' | co-production with Interscope/Shady/Aftermath Films and MTV Films |
| November 23, 2005 | Yours, Mine & Ours | North American distribution only; co-production with Metro-Goldwyn-Mayer, Nickelodeon Movies, Columbia Pictures and Robert Simonds Productions |
| December 2, 2005 | Aeon Flux | distribution outside Italy, Spain, Andorra and Japan only; co-production with Lakeshore Entertainment, Valhalla Motion Pictures and MTV Films |

== 2006 ==
| Release Date | Title | Notes |
|---|---|---|
| January 13, 2006 | Last Holiday | co-production with ImageMovers and Laurence Mark Productions |
| March 10, 2006 | Failure to Launch | co-production with Scott Rudin Productions and Aversano Films |
| March 17, 2006 | She's the Man | North American distribution only; produced by DreamWorks Pictures, Lakeshore Entertainment and the Donners' Company |
| May 5, 2006 | Mission: Impossible III | co-production with Cruise/Wagner Productions |
| May 19, 2006 | Over the Hedge (Note: Owned by Universal Pictures (via DreamWorks Animation)) | distribution outside Japan theatrically and Korea only; produced by DreamWorks Animation; first DreamWorks Animation film to be distributed by Paramount Pictures |
| June 16, 2006 | Nacho Libre | co-production with Nickelodeon Movies, Black & White Productions and HH Films |
| August 4, 2006 | Barnyard | co-production with Nickelodeon Movies and O Entertainment |
| August 9, 2006 | World Trade Center | co-production with Double Feature Films |
| September 15, 2006 | The Last Kiss (Note: Co-owned by Paramount, Vine Alternative Investments and MGM) | North and Hispanic American, German and Austrian distribution only; produced by DreamWorks Pictures and Lakeshore Entertainment |
| September 22, 2006 | Jackass Number Two | co-production with MTV Films, Dickhouse Productions and Lynch Siderow Productions |
| October 20, 2006 | Flags of Our Fathers (Note: Skydance now owns worldwide rights to this film, having acquired Paramount Global in 2025 and Warner Bros. Discovery in 2026.) | North American distribution only; produced by DreamWorks Pictures, Warner Bros. Pictures, Malpaso Productions and Amblin Entertainment |
| November 3, 2006 | Flushed Away | distribution outside Japan theatrically and Korea only; produced by DreamWorks Animation and Aardman Features |
| December 15, 2006 | Charlotte's Web | co-production with Walden Media, the Kerner Entertainment Company and Nickelodeon Movies |
| December 15, 2006 | Dreamgirls | co-production with DreamWorks Pictures and Laurence Mark Productions |
| December 27, 2006 | Perfume: The Story of a Murderer | North American distribution under DreamWorks Pictures only; produced by Constantin Film, Bernd Eichinger Productions, NEF Productions, Davis Films, Rising Star Pictures and Castelao Productions |

== 2007 ==
| Release Date | Title | Notes |
|---|---|---|
| January 5, 2007 | Freedom Writers | co-production with MTV Films, Jersey Films and Double Feature Films |
| February 9, 2007 | Norbit | distribution only; produced by DreamWorks Pictures and Davis Entertainment |
| February 23, 2007 | Reno 911!: Miami | international distribution only; co-production with 20th Century Fox, Comedy Central Films, High Sierra Carpeting, Jersey Films, Double Feature Films and Principato-Young Entertainment |
| March 2, 2007 | Zodiac | North American distribution only; co-production with Warner Bros. Pictures and Phoenix Pictures |
| March 23, 2007 | Shooter | co-production with Di Bonaventura Pictures |
| March 30, 2007 | Blades of Glory | distribution only; produced by DreamWorks Pictures, MTV Films, Red Hour Productions and Smart Entertainment; Japanese theatrical rights licensed to GAGA Corporation |
| April 13, 2007 | Disturbia (Note: Co-owned by Revolution Studios) | distribution only; produced by DreamWorks Pictures, Cold Spring Pictures and the Montecito Picture Company; Japanese theatrical rights licensed to Kadokawa Herald Pictures |
| April 27, 2007 | Next | distribution in the U.S. excluding television, Canada, Latin America, Australia, New Zealand, Germany, Austria and Korea only; produced by Revolution Studios, Initial Entertainment Group, Virtual Studios, Saturn Films and Broken Road Productions |
| May 18, 2007 | Shrek the Third | distribution outside Japan theatrically only; produced by DreamWorks Animation and PDI/DreamWorks |
| July 3, 2007 | Transformers | co-production with DreamWorks Pictures, Hasbro Films and Di Bonaventura Pictures |
| August 3, 2007 | Hot Rod | co-production with Michaels/Goldwyn |
| August 10, 2007 | Stardust | co-production with Marv Films and Di Bonaventura Pictures |
| October 5, 2007 | The Heartbreak Kid | distribution only; produced by DreamWorks Pictures, Radar Pictures, Davis Entertainment and Conundrum Entertainment |
| October 19, 2007 | Things We Lost in the Fire | distribution only; produced by DreamWorks Pictures and Neal Street Productions; Japanese theatrical rights licensed to Kadokawa Herald Pictures |
| November 2, 2007 | Bee Movie | distribution outside Japan theatrically only; produced by DreamWorks Animation and Columbus 81 Productions |
| November 16, 2007 | Beowulf | North American distribution only; produced by Shangri-La Entertainment and ImageMovers |
| December 21, 2007 | Sweeney Todd: The Demon Barber of Fleet Street | North American distribution only; produced by DreamWorks Pictures, Warner Bros. Pictures, Parkes+MacDonald Productions and the Zanuck Company |

== 2008 ==
| Release Date | Title | Notes |
|---|---|---|
| January 18, 2008 | Cloverfield | co-production with Bad Robot |
| February 1, 2008 | Strange Wilderness | distribution in North and Latin America, the U.K., Ireland, Australia, New Zealand, South Africa, France, Germany, Austria, Italy, Spain, the Middle East, Israel, India and Japan only; produced by Level 1 Entertainment and Happy Madison Productions |
| February 14, 2008 | The Spiderwick Chronicles | co-production with Nickelodeon Movies, the Kennedy/Marshall Company and Atmosphere Pictures |
| March 21, 2008 | Drillbit Taylor | co-production with Apatow Productions and Roth-Arnold Productions |
| March 28, 2008 | Stop-Loss | co-production with MTV Films and Scott Rudin Productions |
| April 4, 2008 | The Ruins | distribution outside Poland, Hungary, Portugal, Angola, Mozambique, Greece and Cyprus only; produced by DreamWorks Pictures, Spyglass Entertainment and Red Hour Productions |
| May 2, 2008 | Iron Man (Note: Owned by Disney (via Marvel Studios)) | distribution outside France, Germany, Austria, Spain and Japan only; produced by Marvel Studios and Fairview Entertainment; Inducted into the National Film Registry in 2022 |
| May 22, 2008 | Indiana Jones and the Kingdom of the Crystal Skull | distribution only; produced by Lucasfilm |
| June 6, 2008 | Kung Fu Panda | distribution outside Japan theatrically only; produced by DreamWorks Animation; Nominee for the Academy Award for Best Animated Feature |
| June 20, 2008 | The Love Guru | distribution outside Germany, Austria, Switzerland, Scandinavia and Israel only; co-production with Spyglass Entertainment, No Money Fun Films and Michael De Luca Productions |
| July 25, 2008 | Angus, Thongs and Perfect Snogging | co-production with Nickelodeon Movies |
| August 13, 2008 | Tropic Thunder | distribution only; produced by DreamWorks Pictures and Red Hour Productions |
| September 19, 2008 | Ghost Town | distribution outside Germany, Austria, Switzerland, Scandinavia and Israel only; produced by DreamWorks Pictures, Spyglass Entertainment and Pariah |
| September 26, 2008 | Eagle Eye | distribution only; produced by DreamWorks Pictures and K/O Paper Products; Japanese theatrical rights licensed to Kadokawa Herald Pictures |
| November 7, 2008 | Madagascar: Escape 2 Africa | distribution only; produced by DreamWorks Animation and PDI/DreamWorks |
| December 25, 2008 | The Curious Case of Benjamin Button | North American distribution only; co-production with Warner Bros. Pictures and the Kennedy/Marshall Company; Nominee for the Academy Award for Best Picture |

== 2009 ==
| Release Date | Title | Notes |
|---|---|---|
| January 16, 2009 | Hotel for Dogs | distribution only; produced by DreamWorks Pictures, Nickelodeon Movies, Cold Spring Pictures, the Donners' Company and the Montecito Picture Company |
| January 30, 2009 | The Uninvited | distribution only; produced by DreamWorks Pictures, Cold Spring Pictures, Parkes+MacDonald Productions, the Montecito Picture Company and Vertigo Entertainment |
| February 13, 2009 | Friday the 13th | international distribution only; co-production with New Line Cinema, Crystal Lake Entertainment and Platinum Dunes; distributed in North America by Warner Bros. Pictures |
| March 6, 2009 | Watchmen | international distribution only; co-production with Warner Bros. Pictures, Legendary Pictures, DC Entertainment, Lawrence Gordon Productions and Cruel and Unusual Films |
| March 20, 2009 | I Love You, Man | distribution only; produced by DreamWorks Pictures, De Line Pictures, Bernard Gayle Productions and the Montecito Picture Company |
| March 27, 2009 | Monsters vs. Aliens | distribution only; produced by DreamWorks Animation |
| April 24, 2009 | The Soloist | North American distribution only; produced by DreamWorks Pictures, Universal Pictures, StudioCanal, Participant Media, Krasnoff/Foster Entertainment and Working Title Films |
| May 8, 2009 | Star Trek | co-production with Spyglass Entertainment and Bad Robot |
| May 22, 2009 | Dance Flick | co-production with MTV Films and the Wayans Brothers |
| June 12, 2009 | Imagine That | co-production with Nickelodeon Movies and Di Bonaventura Pictures |
| June 24, 2009 | Transformers: Revenge of the Fallen | co-production with DreamWorks Pictures, Hasbro Studios and Di Bonaventura Pictures |
| August 7, 2009 | G.I. Joe: The Rise of Cobra | co-production with Spyglass Entertainment, Hasbro Studios and Di Bonaventura Pictures |
| September 25, 2009 | Paranormal Activity | North American distribution only; produced by Blumhouse Productions |
| December 4, 2009 | Up in the Air | distribution only; produced by Cold Spring Pictures, DW Studios, the Montecito Picture Company, Rickshaw Productions and Right of Way Films; Nominee for the Academy Award for Best Picture |
| December 11, 2009 | The Lovely Bones | distribution only; produced by DreamWorks Pictures, Film4 Productions and WingNut Films |
