= List of Paramount Pictures films (1970–1979) =

The following is a list of films originally produced and/or distributed theatrically by Paramount Pictures and released in the 1970s.

== 1970 ==
Release date	Title	Notes
February 6, 1970	The Molly Maguires	
February 27, 1970	Tropic of Cancer	co-production with Tropic Productions
March 10, 1970	The Lawyer	
March 25, 1970	The Adventurers	co-production with AVCO Embassy Pictures
May 1970	Connecting Rooms	British film U.S. distribution only; produced by Hemdale (Note: Currently owned by StudioCanal)
May 13, 1970	Tell Me That You Love Me, Junie Moon	co-production with Sigma Productions
May 29, 1970	The Out-of-Towners	co-production with Jalem Productions
June 12, 1970	On a Clear Day You Can See Forever	
June 24, 1970	Catch 22	co-production with Filmways
July 1, 1970	Darling Lili	co-production with Geoffrey Productions
August 10, 1970	Deep End	British
August 14, 1970	Borsalino	French: co-production with Adel Productions, Marianne Productions and Mars Film Produzione
August 19, 1970	WUSA	
October 14, 1970	Aladdin and His Magic Lamp	French film; U.S. distribution only; produced by Films Jean Image
October 21, 1970	Little Fauss and Big Halsy	co-production with Alfran Productions
October 23, 1970	The Conformist	Italian/French film; distribution outside the U.K. only; produced by Mars Film Produzione, Marianne Productions and Maran Film
October 28, 1970	Waterloo	Italian/Soviet Russian film; North and Latin American and Spanish distribution only; produced by Dino De Laurentiis Cinematografica and Mosfilm (Note: Owned by Sony Pictures (via Columbia Pictures))
November 20, 1970	Norwood	
December 11, 1970	The Confession (Note: Co-owned by KG Production)	France
December 16, 1970	The Bear and the Doll	France
December 18, 1970	Love Story	Nominee for the Academy Award for Best Picture co-production with Love Story Company

== 1971 ==
Release date	Title	Notes
March 17, 1971	A New Leaf	Inducted into the National Film Registry in 2019
March 24, 1971	Friends	British film; co-production with Lewis Gilbert Productions
May 12, 1971	Plaza Suite	
June 9, 1971	The Devil's Backbone	British film; U.S. distribution only; produced by Dino De Laurentiis Cinematografica
June 13, 1971	Unman, Wittering and Zigo	British film
June 30, 1971	Willy Wonka & the Chocolate Factory	theatrical distribution only; produced by Wolper Pictures, Ltd. and The Quaker Oats Company (Note: Owned by Warner Bros.); Inducted into the National Film Registry in 2014
July 1, 1971	Murphy's War	British film
August 6, 1971	Let's Scare Jessica to Death	co-production with The Jessica Company
August 18, 1971	A Gunfight	North American distribution only; produced by Joel Productions, Harvest Productions and Thoroughbred Productions
September 15, 1971	Been Down So Long It Looks Like Up to Me	
September 22, 1971	Desperate Characters	North American distribution only; produced by ITC Entertainment (Note: Owned by ITV Studios)
October 20, 1971	T.R. Baskin	
October 22, 1971	Joe Hill	North American distribution only; produced by Sagittarius Productions
November 5, 1971	Hannie Caulder	British film; North American distribution only; produced by Tigon British Film Productions and Curtwel Productions
November 24, 1971	Black Beauty	British film; North American distribution only; produced by Tigon British Film Productions
December 15, 1971	Such Good Friends	co-production with Sigma Productions
December 17, 1971	Four Flies on Grey Velvet	Italy
December 20, 1971	Harold and Maude	co-production with Mildred Lewis and Colin Higgins Productions; Inducted into the National Film Registry in 1997
December 22, 1971	Star Spangled Girl	

== 1972 ==
Release date	Title	Notes
January 21, 1972	Deadhead Miles	
March 3, 1972	Brother Sun, Sister Moon	Italian film
March 17, 1972	The Legend of Nigger Charley	co-production with Spangler & Sons Pictures
March 24, 1972	The Godfather	Winner of the Academy Award for Best Picture co-production with Alfran Productions. Inducted into the National Film Registry in 1990
May 3, 1972	The Pied Piper	British film; North American distribution only; produced by Sagittarius Productions Inc. and Goodtimes Enterprises
May 5, 1972	Play It Again, Sam	co-production with APJAC Productions
May 19, 1972	The Possession of Joel Delaney	British film; North American distribution only; produced by ITC Entertainment and Haworth Productions
May 24, 1972	Z.P.G.	British film; North American distribution only; produced by Sagittarius Productions
July 19, 1972	The Man	co-production with ABC Circle Films and Lorimar (Note: Owned by Disney (via ABC))
August 18, 1972	Last of the Red Hot Lovers	
September 13, 1972	Fear Is the Key	British film; North American distribution only; produced by Anglo-EMI
September 27, 1972	A Separate Peace	
October 13, 1972	Lady Sings the Blues	co-production with Motown Productions
October 20, 1972	Bad Company	
October 25, 1972	Innocent Bystanders	British film; North American distribution only; produced by Sagittarius Productions
December 13, 1972	Child's Play	

== 1973 ==
Release date	Title	Notes
January 12, 1973	The First Circle	North American distribution only; produced by Laterna Film and Tele-Cine Film
February 14, 1973	Save the Tiger	co-production with Filmways
February 28, 1973	Charlotte's Web	North American distribution only; produced by Hanna-Barbera Productions and Sagittarius Productions
April 18, 1973	Charley One-Eye	co-produced by David Paradine Productions
May 4, 1973	Hitler: The Last Ten Days	British film; North American distribution only; produced by Tomorrow Entertainment and West Film
May 8, 1973	Paper Moon	co-production with The Directors Company
May 16, 1973	The Soul of Nigger Charley	
May 20, 1973	The Mattei Affair	
May 22, 1973	A Doll's House	British film; North American distribution only (Note: Owned by MGM)
June 14, 1973	Super Fly T.N.T.	
June 27, 1973	The Friends of Eddie Coyle	
July 24, 1973	Badge 373	
August 22, 1973	Bang the Drum Slowly	co-production with ANJA Films and BTDS Partnership
September 19, 1973	Save the Children	
September 21, 1973	Hit!	
October 17, 1973	The Optimists	British film; North American distribution only; produced by Sagittarius Productions, Cheetah Productions and West One Film Producers
October 23, 1973	Jonathan Livingston Seagull	
October 31, 1973	Tales That Witness Madness	British film; co-production with World Film Services
November 7, 1973	Ash Wednesday	North American distribution only; produced by Sagittarius Productions
November 14, 1973	Scalawag	U.S. distribution only; produced by The Bryna Company
December 5, 1973	Serpico	North American, U.K., French and Japanese distribution only; produced by Produzion De Laurentiis International Manufacturing Company S.P.A. and Artists Entertainments Complex, Inc.
December 17, 1973	Alfredo, Alfredo	Italian film

== 1974 ==
Release date	Title	Notes
January 25, 1974	Don't Look Now	British film; North American distribution only; produced by British Lion Films, Casey Productions and Eldorado Films
February 27, 1974	Man on a Swing	co-production with Jaffilms Inc.
March 15, 1974	Three Tough Guys	North American and U.K. distribution only; produced by Dino De Laurentiis Cinematografica
March 29, 1974	The Great Gatsby	co-production with Newdon Productions
April 5, 1974	The Conversation	Nominee for the Academy Award for Best Picture distribution only; produced by The Directors Company and The Coppola Company (Note: Owned by American Zoetrope with Lionsgate Studios (via Lionsgate Films) handling distribution in North America and StudioCanal internationally); Inducted into the National Film Registry in 1995
April 12, 1974	Frankenstein and the Monster from Hell	British film; North American distribution only; produced by Hammer Films
May 22, 1974	Daisy Miller	co-production with The Directors Company
June 5, 1974	Malicious	Italy; US distribution only
June 12, 1974	Captain Kronos – Vampire Hunter	British: co-produced by Hammer Films
June 14, 1974	The Parallax View	co-production with Gus Productions, Harbor Productions and Doubleday Productions
June 21, 1974	Chinatown	Nominee for the Academy Award for Best Picture co-production with Long Road Productions and Robert Evans Company; Inducted into the National Film Registry in 1991
July 12, 1974	The Apprenticeship of Duddy Kravitz	U.S. distribution only; produced by Astral-Bellevue-Pathé, Canadian Film Development Corporation and Famous Players
July 17, 1974	The Education of Sonny Carson	
July 19, 1974	The White Dawn	co-production with American Film Properties and Filmways
July 24, 1974	Death Wish	North American and U.K. distribution only; produced by Dino De Laurentiis Corporation
August 30, 1974	The Longest Yard	co-production with Albert S. Ruddy Productions and Long Road Productions
September 13, 1974	The Dove	
September 27, 1974	Phase IV	co-production with Alced Productions
October 2, 1974	The Gambler	co-production with Chartoff-Winkler Productions, Inc.
October 9, 1974	Shanks	
November 8, 1974	The Little Prince	co-production with Stanley Donen Films
November 20, 1974	The Klansman	co-produced by Atlanta Productions
November 22, 1974	Murder on the Orient Express	British film; North American and Japanese distribution only; produced by EMI Films
December 20, 1974	The Godfather Part II	Winner of the Academy Award for Best Picture co-production with The Coppola Company; Inducted into the National Film Registry in 1993

== 1975 ==
Release date	Title	Notes
April 30, 1975	Dogpound Shuffle	U.S. distribution only; Canadian film; produced by ITC Entertainment
May 7, 1975	The Day of the Locust	co-production with Long Road Productions
May 14, 1975	Sheila Levine Is Dead and Living in New York	
June 4, 1975	Posse	co-production with Bryna Productions
June 6, 1975	Bug	
June 11, 1975	Nashville	Nominee for the Academy Award for Best Picture co-production with ABC Entertainment; Inducted into the National Film Registry in 1992
June 20, 1975	Once Is Not Enough	
July 25, 1975	Mandingo	North American and U.K. distribution only; produced by Dino De Laurentiis Company
August 15, 1975	Framed	
September 25, 1975	Three Days of the Condor	North American and U.K. distribution only; produced by Dino De Laurentiis Corporation
October 8, 1975	Mahogany	co-production with Motown Productions
December 11, 1975	The Fifth Offensive	Yugoslavian film; U.S. distribution only; produced by Bosna Film, Filmska Radna Zajednica, and Televizija Sarajevo
December 17, 1975	Emmanuelle 2	French film U.S. theatrical distribution only; produced by Parafrance Films
December 24, 1975	Hustle	

== 1976 ==
Release date	Title	Notes
March 17, 1976	The First Nudie Musical (Note: Distribution rights currently owned by Quiver Distribution)	
April 2, 1976	Lipstick	
April 5, 1976	Face to Face	Swedish film North American, U.K. and French distribution only; produced by Cinematograph AB
April 7, 1976	The Bad News Bears	
May 26, 1976	Won Ton Ton, the Dog Who Saved Hollywood	
May 28, 1976	Leadbelly	
June 11, 1976	The Tenant	French film co-production with Marianne Productions
June 25, 1976	The Big Bus	
July 21, 1976	Lifeguard	
August 4, 1976	Survive!	Mexican film; U.S. distribution only; produced by Avant Films S.A.
August 20, 1976	The Shootist	co-production with Dino De Laurentiis Productions
September 15, 1976	Bugsy Malone	North American distribution only; co-production with the Rank Organisation, Robert Stigwood Organisation and Goodtimes Enterprises
October 1, 1976	The Memory of Justice	
October 8, 1976	Marathon Man	
November 19, 1976	The Last Tycoon	co-production with Academy Pictures Corporation
December 17, 1976	King Kong	North American distribution only; produced by Dino De Laurentiis Company
December 22, 1976	Mikey and Nicky	U.S. distribution only; produced by Castle Hill Productions (Note: Owned by Jumer Productions, with distribution handled by Janus Films and The Criterion Collection)

== 1977 ==
Release date	Title	Notes
February 11, 1977	Thieves	theatrical distribution only; produced by Brut Productions (Note: Owned by Warner Bros. Pictures (via Turner Entertainment Co.))
March 9, 1977	Islands in the Stream	
March 11, 1977	Black Sunday	
June 1, 1977	Fraternity Row	
June 24, 1977	Sorcerer	co-production with Universal Pictures and Film Properties International N.V. (Note: U.S. distribution rights currently split between Paramount for theatrical, Universal Television for television and Warner Bros. Home Entertainment for home video and streaming; international rights licensed to third parties)
July 8, 1977	The Bad News Bears in Breaking Training	
July 15, 1977	The Shadow of Chikara	theatrical distribution only
July 22, 1977	Orca	North American distribution only; produced by Famous Films
August 24, 1977	Race for Your Life, Charlie Brown	co-production with United Feature Syndicate, Lee Mendelson Film Productions and Bill Melendez Productions
September 29, 1977	Handle with Care aka Citizen's Band	
October 19, 1977	Looking for Mr. Goodbar	
November 4, 1977	1900	Italy; North American distribution only; produced by Produzioni Europee Associati and Les Productions Artistes Associés
November 4, 1977	First Love	
December 16, 1977	Saturday Night Fever	co-production with Robert Stigwood Organization; Inducted into the National Film Registry in 2010

== 1978 ==
Release date	Title	Notes
January 13, 1978	The Duellists	British film co-production with Enigma Productions, Scott Free Enterprises and National Film Finance Consortium
February 3, 1978	The One and Only	co-production with First Artists
February 15, 1978	The Serpent's Egg	North American theatrical distribution only; produced by Dino De Laurentiis Productions
March 17, 1978	American Hot Wax	
April 5, 1978	Pretty Baby	
April 14, 1978	Joseph Andrews	British film; North American distribution only; produced by Woodfall Film Productions
June 16, 1978	Grease	co-production with Allan Carr Enterprises and Stigwood Group; Inducted into the National Film Registry in 2020
June 28, 1978	Heaven Can Wait	Nominee for the Academy Award for Best Picture
June 30, 1978	The Bad News Bears Go to Japan	
July 14, 1978	Foul Play	
September 13, 1978	Days of Heaven	Inducted into the National Film Registry in 2007
September 15, 1978	Up in Smoke	Inducted into the National Film Registry in 2024
September 29, 1978	Death on the Nile	British film; North American distribution only; produced by EMI Films
October 6, 1978	Goin' South	
December 15, 1978	Oliver's Story	
December 20, 1978	King of the Gypsies	North American distribution only; produced by Dino De Laurentiis Company

== 1979 ==
Release date	Title	Notes
February 9, 1979	The Warriors	
March 23, 1979	Real Life	
April 12, 1979	Hurricane	North American distribution only; produced by Dino De Laurentiis Productions
April 27, 1979	An Almost Perfect Affair	
June 8, 1979	Players	
June 14, 1979	The Kirlian Witness	distribution only; produced by CNI CINEMA
June 15, 1979	Prophecy	
June 22, 1979	Escape from Alcatraz	co-production with The Malpaso Company
June 29, 1979	Meatballs	distribution only; produced by Haliburton Films, Famous Players and CFDC (Note: Owned by Lionsgate in the U.S. and retained by Paramount Pictures internationally)
June 29, 1979	Bloodline	
August 3, 1979	North Dallas Forty	
August 10, 1979	Sunburn	North American distribution only; produced by Hemdale, Fawcett-Majors Productions, Tuesday Films and Bind Films
October 5, 1979	Starting Over	
October 26, 1979	French Postcards	co-production with NF Geria II Filmgesellschaft m.b.H.
December 7, 1979	Star Trek: The Motion Picture	
