= List of Paramount Pictures films (1950–1959) =

The following is a list of films originally produced and/or distributed theatrically by Paramount Pictures and released in the 1950s.

== 1950 ==
Release date	Title	Notes
January 5, 1950	The File on Thelma Jordon	produced by Wallis-Hazen; First film in the post-1949 library owned by Paramount themselves From this point forward, Paramount owns most of the following titles.
February 2, 1950	Captain China	produced by Pine-Thomas Productions
February 15, 1950	Paid in Full	
February 21, 1950	No Man of Her Own	
February 21, 1950	Captain Carey, U.S.A.	
April 12, 1950	Riding High	
May 30, 1950	The Eagle and the Hawk	produced by Pine-Thomas Productions
June 9, 1950	The Lawless	produced by Pine-Thomas Productions
July 4, 1950	My Friend Irma Goes West	
July 19, 1950	Fancy Pants	
July 21, 1950	The Furies	
August 10, 1950	Sunset Boulevard	Starring Gloria Swanson as Norma Desmond. Nominated for 11 Academy Awards, including Best Picture. Inducted into the National Film Registry in 1989
September 8, 1950	Union Station	
October 3, 1950	Cassino to Korea	produced by CNI Cinema
October 6, 1950	Dark City	produced by Hal Wallis Productions
October 10, 1950	Trio	
October 18, 1950	September Affair	
November 9, 1950	Tripoli	produced by Pine-Thomas Productions
November 15, 1950	Copper Canyon	
November 29, 1950	Let's Dance	
December 8, 1950	Mr. Music	
December 23, 1950	Branded	
December 23, 1950	The Goldbergs	

== 1951 ==
Release date	Title	Notes
January 12, 1951	The Mating Season	
January 17, 1951	At War with the Army	distribution only; produced by Fred F. Finklehoffe Productions, Screen Associates Inc. & York Pictures Corporation (Note: In the public domain) (Note: Owned by Kino Lorber and Multicom Entertainment Group)
March 15, 1951	The Redhead and the Cowboy	
March 15, 1951	Quebec	
April 2, 1951	The Lemon Drop Kid	distribution only; produced by Hope Enterprises (Note: Owned by Fremantle)
April 4, 1951	The Last Outpost	produced by Pine-Thomas Productions
April 7, 1951	The Great Missouri Raid	
May 9, 1951	Appointment with Danger	
May 30, 1951	Dear Brat	
May 31, 1951	That's My Boy	
June 29, 1951	Ace in the Hole	Inducted into the National Film Registry in 2017
July 18, 1951	Peking Express	
August 8, 1951	Darling, How Could You!	
August 14, 1951	A Place in the Sun	Nominee for the Academy Award for Best Picture; Inducted into the National Film Registry in 1991
August 30, 1951	Passage West	produced by Pine-Thomas Productions
August 1951	Warpath	
September 20, 1951	Here Comes the Groom	
September 27, 1951	Rhubarb	
November 6, 1951	Detective Story	
November 15, 1951	When Worlds Collide	
November 1951	Red Mountain	
November 1951	Submarine Command	
December 1, 1951	Silver City	
December 6, 1951	Crosswinds	produced by Pine-Thomas Productions
December 25, 1951	My Favorite Spy	

== 1952 ==
Release date	Title	Notes
January 10, 1952	The Greatest Show on Earth	Winner of the Academy Award for Best Picture
January 12, 1952	Hong Kong	produced by Pine-Thomas Productions
February 9, 1952	Sailor Beware	
February 15, 1952	Flaming Feather	
March 7, 1952	Something to Live For	
April 1, 1952	Aaron Slick from Punkin Crick	
April 2, 1952	Encore	
April 3, 1952	Anything Can Happen	
April 8, 1952	My Son John	
May 1, 1952	The Atomic City	
May 16, 1952	Denver and Rio Grande	
June 11, 1952	Jumping Jacks	
July 14, 1952	Son of Paleface	distribution only; produced by Hope Enterprises
July 17, 1952	Carrie	
August 21, 1952	Just for You	
September 24, 1952	Somebody Loves Me	
September 1952	The Savage	
September 1952	Caribbean Gold	produced by Pine-Thomas Productions
October 3, 1952	Hurricane Smith	
November 14, 1952	The Turning Point	
December 24, 1952	Come Back, Little Sheba	
December 25, 1952	Road to Bali	distribution only; produced by Hope Enterprises; The sixth of the Road films
December 31, 1952	The Stooge	
December 1952	The Blazing Forest	produced by Pine-Thomas Productions

== 1953 ==
Release date	Title	Notes
January 14, 1953	Tropic Zone	
February 3, 1953	Thunder in the East	
March 11, 1953	The Stars Are Singing	
March 26, 1953	Off Limits	
April 1, 1953	The Girls of Pleasure Island	
April 22, 1953	Jamaica Run	produced by Pine-Thomas Productions
April 23, 1953	Shane	Nominee for the Academy Award for Best Picture; Inducted into the National Film Registry in 1993
April 27, 1953	Scared Stiff	
May 27, 1953	Sangaree	produced by Pine-Thomas Productions
June 3, 1953	The Vanquished	produced by Pine-Thomas Productions
June 5, 1953	Pony Express	
June 6, 1953	Stalag 17	
July 2, 1953	Houdini	
August 3, 1953	Arrowhead	
August 10, 1953	The Caddy	
August 26, 1953	The War of the Worlds	Inducted into the National Film Registry in 2011
September 2, 1953	Roman Holiday	Nominee for the Academy Award for Best Picture; Inducted into the National Film Registry in 1999
October 7, 1953	Botany Bay	
October 16, 1953	Those Redheads from Seattle	produced by Pine-Thomas Productions
October 22, 1953	Here Come the Girls	distribution only; produced by Hope Enterprises
October 1953	Little Boy Lost	
November 21, 1953	Flight to Tangier	
November 24, 1953	Cease Fire	
November 28, 1953	Forever Female	
December 31, 1953	Money from Home	

== 1954 ==
Release date	Title	Notes
January 27, 1954	Alaska Seas	
February 12, 1954	Jivaro	
March 3, 1954	The Naked Jungle	
March 26, 1954	Red Garters	
April 7, 1954	Casanova's Big Night	
April 14, 1954	Knock on Wood	
April 21, 1954	Elephant Walk	
June 6, 1954	Secret of the Incas	
July 23, 1954	Living It Up	
August 3, 1954	About Mrs. Leslie	
September 1, 1954	Rear Window	distribution only; produced by Alfred J. Hitchcock Productions; (Note: Owned by Universal Pictures); Inducted into the National Film Registry in 1997
October 14, 1954	White Christmas	Inducted into the National Film Registry in 2025
October 15, 1954	Sabrina	Inducted into the National Film Registry in 2002
December 22, 1954	3 Ring Circus	

== 1955 ==
Release date	Title	Notes
January 20, 1955	The Bridges at Toko-Ri	
March 25, 1955	Strategic Air Command	
March 25, 1955	Two Brothers for Six Parents	
March 30, 1955	Mambo	
April 20, 1955	Conquest of Space	
May 14, 1955	Run for Cover	produced by Pine-Thomas Productions
May 17, 1955	The Country Girl	Nominee for the Academy Award for Best Picture
May 20, 1955	The Far Horizons	produced by Pine-Thomas Productions
June 23, 1955	The Seven Little Foys	distribution only; produced by Hope Enterprises
June 27, 1955	Hell's Island	produced by Pine-Thomas Productions
July 7, 1955	We're No Angels	
July 20, 1955	You're Never Too Young	
August 3, 1955	To Catch a Thief	directed by Alfred Hitchcock
September 30, 1955	The Girl Rush	
October 3, 1955	The Trouble with Harry	distribution only; produced by Alfred J. Hitchcock Productions
October 5, 1955	The Desperate Hours	
October 20, 1955	Lucy Gallant	produced by Pine-Thomas Productions
October 1955	Ulysses	distribution only; produced by Lux Film, Producciones Ponti-de Laurentiis and Zénith Films
November 7, 1955	Artists and Models	
December 12, 1955	The Rose Tattoo	Nominee for the Academy Award for Best Picture

== 1956 ==
Release date	Title	Notes
January 27, 1956	The Court Jester	Inducted into the National Film Registry in 2004
April 22, 1956	The Birds and the Bees	
April 1956	Anything Goes	
April 1956	The Scarlet Hour	
June 1, 1956	The Man Who Knew Too Much	distribution only; produced by Filwite Productions
June 4, 1956	That Certain Feeling	distribution only; produced by Hope Enterprises
June 6, 1956	The Leather Saint	
June 13, 1956	The Proud and Profane	
July 17, 1956	Godzilla, King of the Monsters!	Released in Spain
August 1, 1956	Pardners	
August 21, 1956	War and Peace	
August 29, 1956	The Vagabond King	
October 1, 1956	The Search for Bridey Murphy	
October 5, 1956	The Ten Commandments	Nominee for the Academy Award for Best Picture. A remake of the 1923 film, in VistaVision. It has been annually broadcast by the ABC television network in the United States since 1973, traditionally the evening before Easter Sunday. Inducted into the National Film Registry in 1999
November 14, 1956	The Mountain	
December 6, 1956	Hollywood or Bust	16th and final Martin and Lewis comedy film.
December 13, 1956	The Rainmaker	

== 1957 ==
Release date	Title	Notes
February 9, 1957	Three Violent People	
February 13, 1957	Funny Face	
March 20, 1957	Fear Strikes Out	
May 30, 1957	Gunfight at the O.K. Corral	
May 1957	The Buster Keaton Story	
June 6, 1957	The Delicate Delinquent	
June 7, 1957	Beau James	
July 9, 1957	Loving You	distribution only (Note: Owned by Universal Pictures through NBC)
August 23, 1957	Omar Khayyam	
September 26, 1957	The Joker Is Wild	
September 1957	Short Cut to Hell	
October 4, 1957	The Devil's Hairpin	
October 16, 1957	Mister Rock and Roll	
October 23, 1957	The Tin Star	
October 25, 1957	Spanish Affair	
October 1957	Hear Me Good	
November 5, 1957	Stowaway Girl	
November 10, 1957	The Lonely Man	
November 13, 1957	Zero Hour!	Theatrical distribution, co-production with Bartlett-Champion Productions, Carmel Productions and Delta Enterprises Inc. (Note: Owned by Warner Bros.)
November 27, 1957	The Sad Sack	
December 11, 1957	Wild Is the Wind	

== 1958 ==
Release date	Title	Notes
January 24, 1958	High Hell	
March 12, 1958	Desire Under the Elms	
March 14, 1958	Country Music Holiday	
April 1, 1958	Teacher's Pet	
April 7, 1958	St. Louis Blues	
May 2, 1958	Another Time, Another Place	
May 9, 1958	Vertigo	distribution only; produced by Alfred J. Hitchcock Productions; Inducted into the National Film Registry in 1989
May 21, 1958	Maracaibo	
June 1958	The Space Children	
June 1958	Hot Spell	
July 2, 1958	King Creole	
July 23, 1958	Rock-A-Bye Baby	
August 12, 1958	The Matchmaker	
September 12, 1958	The Blob	theatrical distribution only; produced by Fairview Productions, Tonylyn Productions and Valley Forge Films (Note: Owned by Worldwide Entertainment Corporation, with distribution rights licensed to Sony Pictures)
September 1958	As Young as We Are	
September 1958	The Party Crashers	
October 3, 1958	I Married a Monster from Outer Space	
November 1, 1958	When Hell Broke Loose	
November 2, 1958	The Geisha Boy	
November 19, 1958	Houseboat	
November 19, 1958	The Colossus of New York	
December 1, 1958	The Buccaneer	A remake of the 1936 version; filmed in Technicolor and VistaVision.
December 1958	The Hot Angel	

== 1959 ==
Release date	Title	Notes
January 28, 1959	The Trap	
February 12, 1959	The Black Orchid	
February 1959	The Young Captives	
February 1959	Tokyo After Dark	
March 26, 1959	Tempest	
April 8, 1959	Thunder in the Sun	
June 16, 1959	Don't Give Up the Ship	
June 17, 1959	The Hangman	
June 18, 1959	The Five Pennies	
June 1959	The Man Who Could Cheat Death	
July 8, 1959	Tarzan's Greatest Adventure	distribution only; produced by Solar Film Productions
July 29, 1959	Last Train from Gun Hill	
August 19, 1959	But Not for Me	
September 11, 1959	That Kind of Woman	
October 8, 1959	Career	
October 15, 1959	The Jayhawkers!	
December 11, 1959	Li'l Abner	Based on the comic strip of the same name
