= Champagne for Breakfast =

1935 film directed by Melville Brown

- Directed by: Melville Brown; Ray Culley, assistant director
- Screenplay by: George Waggner
- Story by: E. Morton Hough
- Produced by: M. H. Hoffman
- Starring: Mary Carlisle; Hardie Albright; Joan Marsh
- Cinematography: Gilbert Warrenton
- Edited by: Louis Sackin
- Production company: Liberty Pictures
- Distributed by: Columbia Pictures
- Release date: June 18, 1935 (US)
- Running time: 69 minutes
- Country: United States
- Language: English

Champagne for Breakfast is a 1935 American comedy-drama film, directed by Melville Brown. It stars Mary Carlisle, Hardie Albright, and Joan Marsh, and was released on June 18, 1935.

== Plot ==
When struggling attorney Bob Bentley is forced to take a job as a process server, he meets Vivian and Natalie Morton at their father's house when he goes to serve some papers to the elder Morton. While there, he learns that the family has fallen on hard times, and in the course of his visit he and the two daughters discover the Bradley Morton's dead body, who has committed suicide. The only asset they have remaining is an avocado farm in California. Vivian and Bob begin a romance. With nowhere to live after their house and its contents are auctioned off, the girls agree to stay in the apartment of Wayne Osborne, their father's ex-business partner. Osborne is romancing Natalie, while trying to get her to agree to sell him the lease of the avocado farm. Unbeknownst to the girls, Osborne is attempting to swindle them out of the property, so he can sell it at a huge profit to Mr. Reach, who wants to develop it into a racetrack. Natalie wants to sell the lease to Osborne, but Vivian is suspicious of him. Bob and his roommate, Swifty Greer, and their friend, known as "The Judge", begin to investigate Osborne. The Judge is a known gambler. Through Edie, Reach's daughter, Bob learns of the plans for the raceway. He puts together all the details of the plan and puts the paperwork in his briefcase. When Vivian sees Bob out with Edie, she gets the wrong idea, and refuses to see him. Bob realizes that Reach does not know of Osborne's under-handedness, and meets him to tell him what is going on. Reach does not believe Bob, so Bob takes him to his office, to show him the paperwork which will prove what he is talking about. However, the Judge has used the briefcase as surety on a horse wager he has made. However, before things can get worse, the Judge arrives with the briefcase, having won his bet. Osborne and an associate are arrested, and Reach buys the avocado farm from the Morton sisters.

== Cast ==
- Mary Carlisle as Edie Reach
- Hardie Albright as Bob Bentley
- Joan Marsh as Vivian Morton
- Lila Lee as Natalie Morton
- Sidney Toler as The judge
- Bradley Page as [Wayne] Osborne
- Emerson Treacy as Swifty [Greer]
- Adrian Rosley as Alberto Vermicelli
- Wallis Clark as Reach
- Clarence Wilson as Monte Raeburn

== Production ==
In April it was announced that Melville Brown would be directing the project. At the same time the cast was revealed to include Joan Marsh, Hardie Albright, Mary Carlisle, Vince Barnett, Bradley Page, Luis Alberni, Emerson Treacy, Lila Lee, Sidney Toler, Edward Martindel, Lucien Privel, Clarence Wilson, Tammany Young, Jack Grey, and Will Stanton. Production was completed by the beginning May 1935. The film was originally scheduled for release on June 26, but opened on June 18.

== Reception ==
Silver Screen gave the film a "so-so" review. Motion Picture Review gave the film a negative review saying it was a "shallow and pointless story dressed up with smart talk and scenes of fashionable restaurants." Harrison's Reports was kinder to the film, complimenting the acting of both Mary Carlisle and Sidney Toler. They felt the film was at times humorous and at other times suspenseful, and enjoyed the ending.
