= The Old Fashioned Way (film) =

1934 film by William Beaudine

- Directed by: William Beaudine
- Written by: Jack Cunningham; W. C. Fields
- Produced by: William LeBaron
- Starring: W. C. Fields; Joe Morrison; Baby LeRoy; Judith Allen; Jan Duggan; Tammany Young; Nora Cecil; Oscar Apfel
- Cinematography: Ben F. Reynolds
- Music by: John Leipold
- Production company: Paramount Pictures
- Distributed by: Paramount Pictures
- Release date: July 13, 1934
- Running time: 70 minutes
- Country: United States
- Language: English

The Old Fashioned Way is a 1934 American comedy film produced by Paramount Pictures. The film was directed by William Beaudine and stars W. C. Fields. The script was written by Jack Cunningham based on a story by "Charles Bogle" (one of Fields's writing pseudonyms).

== Plot ==
In 1897, a blustery actor-manager, "The Great McGonigle" (W. C. Fields), and his traveling theater troupe is perpetually underfunded and always just a step ahead of the law and creditors. McGonigle's daughter Betty (Judith Allen) is loyal to her father, and she tries to discourage a suitor named Wally Livingston (Joe Morrison), telling him he should follow his own father's wishes and go to college instead of trying to become an actor. Along with the rest of the troupe is McGonigle's slow-witted assistant Marmaduke (Tammany Young).

Wally's wealthy father (Oscar Apfel) arrives in the town where the troupe is scheduled to perform the stirring melodrama The Drunkard. One of the players has resigned, and Wally wins the part, affording him a chance to act and also to perform a couple of songs in his strong tenor voice. His father is impressed by his son's talent, and his skepticism about Betty is eased when he learns that she has been trying to get Wally to return to college.

McGonigle renews his acquaintance with Cleopatra Pepperday (Jan Duggan), a wealthy and untalented widow who has an infant son (Baby LeRoy), and exploits her to stave off the local sheriff, who is Pepperday's boyfriend. To secure her financial support, McGonigle promises her a cameo role in The Drunkard, with one line of dialogue: "Here comes the prince." The play has no reference to any prince, of course, and act after act comes and goes with her rehearsing her line in fond hope, but her cue never comes. At the end of the play, distraught and crying, she runs into the arms of the sheriff. After the play concludes, McGonigle comes onstage and performs a juggling act.

McGonigle learns that the troupe's booking agency is canceling the tour, due to poor advance reports. McGonigle, facing the inevitable parting from Betty but hiding his hurt feelings, tells her that he has decided to close the show and seek his fortune in New York City. The bride and groom and his father ride the train back to the Livingston home, and Betty gets a telegram from her father stating that things are going well in the big city. In reality, McGonigle has become a street-corner snake-oil salesman.

== Cast ==
- W. C. Fields as The Great McGonigle / Squire Cribbs in "The Drunkard"
- Joe Morrison as Wally Livingston / William Dowton in "The Drunkard"
- Baby LeRoy as Albert Pepperday
- Judith Allen as Betty McGonigle / Agnes Dowton in "The Drunkard"
- Jan Duggan as Cleopatra Pepperday
- Tammany Young as Marmaduke Gump
- Nora Cecil as Mrs. Wendelschaffer
- Lew Kelly as Sheriff Walter Jones
- Jack Mulhall as Dick Bronson, resigning actor
- Oscar Apfel as Mr. Livingston
- Otis Harlan as Mr. Wendelschaffer
- Samuel Ethridge as Bartley Neuville / Edward Middleton / The Drunkard in "The Drunkard"
- Ruth Marion as Agatha Sprague / Mary Wilson in "The Drunkard"
- Richard Carle as Sheriff of Barnesville
- Larry Grenier as Drover Stevens in "The Drunkard"
- William Blatchford as Landlord in "The Drunkard"
- Jeffrey Williams as Mrs. Arden Renclelaw in "The Drunkard"
- Donald Brown as The Minister in "The Drunkard"

== Production notes ==
Fields's "Great McGonigle" character—a riff on the Great Ziegfeld—resembles the self-important frauds he had played on Broadway in Poppy (1923) and its silent-film adaptation Sally of the Sawdust (1925). He would return to variations of this character in his later films.

The play depicted in the film is the American temperance play The Drunkard; or, The Fallen Saved, first performed in 1844. In 1933 little-theater producer Galt Bell mounted a revival of The Drunkard in Los Angeles. The show opened on July 6, 1933, and was an immediate success. Bell presented The Drunkard as an audience-participation show, and urged the crowd to hiss the villain and cheer the hero. Bell's festive approach ensured steady audiences and repeat customers. The play became a popular venue for movie people, and enjoyed an extraordinary 26-year run.

W. C. Fields loved the show and wanted to make a film version. He arranged for Paramount Pictures to hire members of the Los Angeles stage company: Jan Duggan, Ruth Marion, Samuel Ethridge, Larry Grenier, and William Blatchford. The villain of The Drunkard, actor Henry Kleinbach, was also signed; Fields kept Kleinbach on hand during the filming. Fields would be appearing in the Drunkard part of the film, but hadn't decided which role he would take. Fields finally took Kleinbach's role of Squire Cribbs in the film version. Fields especially enjoyed working with Jan Duggan as a comedy foil; her "Seashore" song from the stage show was featured in The Old Fashioned Way and she appeared in five of his films. Henry Kleinbach enjoyed a long career as a movie character actor (as Henry Brandon), as did Samuel Ethridge (as Sam Flint).

As the film's centerpiece, the Drunkard sequence runs about 20 minutes and is performed in the style of the late 1890s. Reaction shots show audience members at a pitch of emotional involvement: an excited elderly spectator is cautioned by his wife to think of his heart; a young sophisticate skeptically asks his pretty date, "Do you think this is a good play?" to which she answers rapturously, eyes glued to the stage, "Oh, yes!" For the 1930s, the film is unusual in that it does not mock but instead nostalgically celebrates the enthusiasm 1890s American small-town audiences had for traveling theatrical companies of all sorts.

McGonigle's juggling act seen in the film affords a rare opportunity to observe Fields's own juggling talent—his famous vaudeville specialty—as he juggles airborne balls and cigar boxes. In this bit, Fields looks relatively fit and slim, in contrast to the plumper look that became familiar in later years.

Director William Beaudine was impressed by Fields's dramatic ability during the climactic parting scene: "Fields had played the buffoon all through the picture. The audience was expecting a funny twist to this scene, too. And if Fields had made the slightest false step, the whole tragedy of his parting would have gone to pieces in a burst of laughter. But he didn't make that false step. He acted with the pathos of the true clown. He held his audience and conveyed the sadness of the old man's parting with the only person who meant anything in his life. That was a great bit of acting."

== Reception ==
The Old Fashioned Way was very well received by critics and moviegoers. The Hollywood Reporter headlined its review "Old Fashioned Way a Riot; Fields-Morrison Steal the Picture" and advised showmen, "Get behind this one with everything you've got, because it's entertainment from start to finish and there are laughs in it for every member of the family. Come to think of it, there is no story -- just names and a situation that serve as an excuse for having W. C. Fields amuse you for seven reels, and the less excuse there is for him, the funnier he is... William Beaudine must have had a time for himself directing this, because his own good humor is reflected in the way the gags go over. There is one in which the laughs are sustained for a full ten minutes." John Scott of the Los Angeles Times saluted the star: "W. C. Fields has been nominated, elected, and has taken office as the funniest man on the screen today. At least as far as I am concerned. And you probably will agree after viewing The Old Fashioned Way. In his previous comedies the actor has really been the same character, and in the new effort he just plays himself. I'll defy anyone to count the resulting laughs in The Old Fashioned Way." The Boston Globe agreed: "The Old Fashioned Way has some exceedingly good burlesque scenes, notably the performance of The Drunkard in a good old-fashioned melodramatic manner... [Fields's] battles with Baby LeRoy at the dinner table are hilariously funny, and his methods for getting away from process servers and irate landladies evoke shouts of delighted mirth." The Hartford Courant raved, "The veteran comedian of the stage and screen is at his best. Fields handles all of his comedy roles with a deftness that is peculiarly his own. Incidentally he does a bit of juggling in the picture that shows he has not lost any of his talent of earlier days."
