= Clarence Wilson (actor) =

American actor (1876–1941)

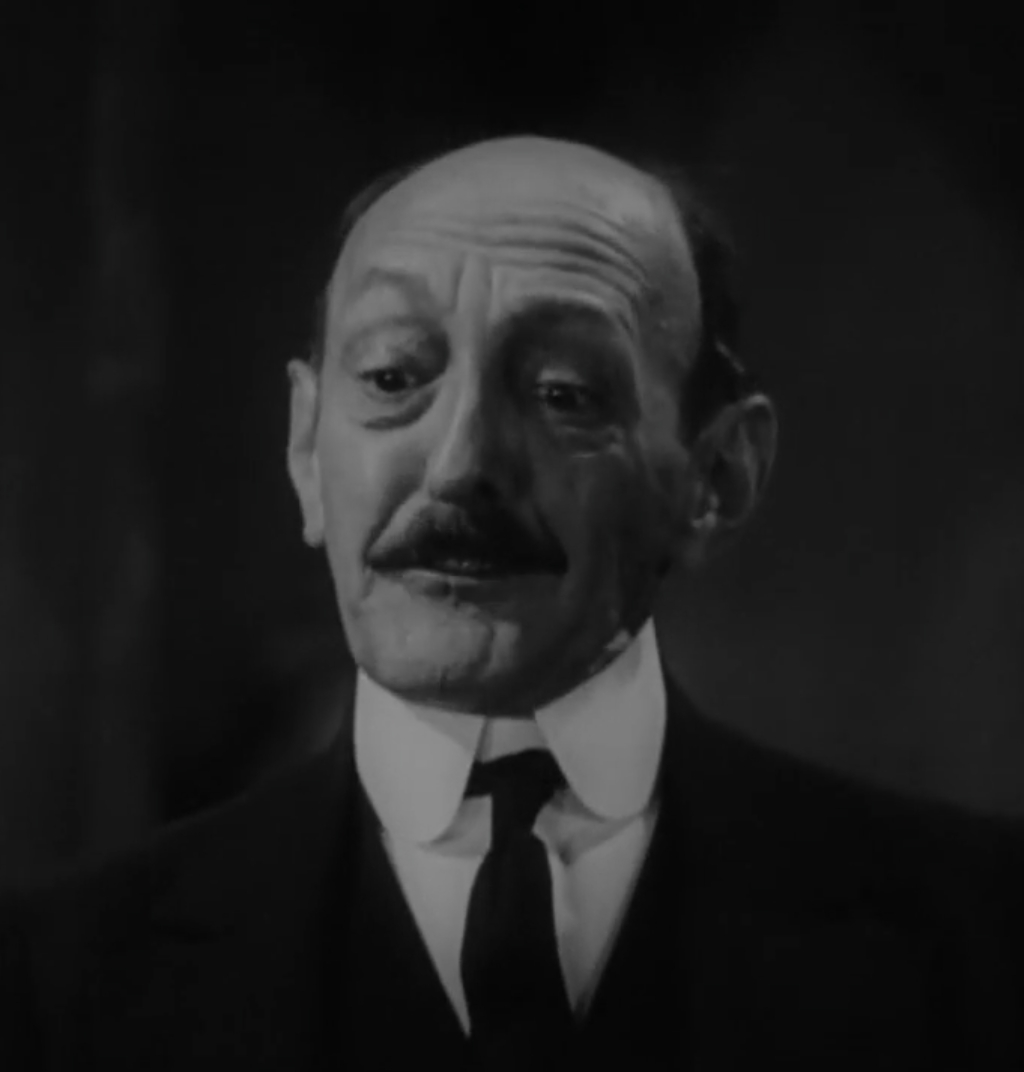
- Wilson in The Front Page (1931)
- Born: Clarence Hummel Wilson; November 17, 1876; Cincinnati, Ohio, U.S.
- Died: October 5, 1941 (aged 64); Hollywood, California, U.S.
- Resting place: Grand View Memorial Park Cemetery
- Occupation: Actor
- Years active: 1920–1941

Clarence Hummel Wilson (November 17, 1876 – October 5, 1941) was an American character actor.

== Career ==
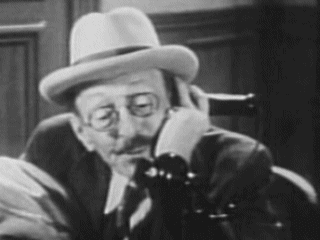
A Shriek in the Night (1933)

Wilson appeared in nearly 200 movies between 1920 and 1941, mostly in supporting roles as an old miser or grouch. He had supporting roles in films like The Front Page (1931; as Sheriff Pinky), Ruggles of Red Gap (1935) and You Can't Take It With You (1938). Wilson also played in several Our Gang comedies, most notably as Mr. Crutch in Shrimps for a Day and school board chairman Alonzo Pratt in Come Back, Miss Pipps, his final film.

== Death ==
Wilson died on October 5, 1941, and he was interred at Grand View Memorial Park Cemetery in Glendale, California.

== Selected filmography ==
- Duds (1920) - Jues
- The Penalty (1920) - A Crook (uncredited)
- The Little Grey Mouse (1920) - Henry Lealor
- Are All Men Alike? (1920)
- The Land of Jazz (1920) - Minor Role
- The First Born (1921) - Kury Lar
- While the Devil Laughs (1921) - Joe Franklin
- Oliver Twist, Jr. (1921) - Fagin
- The Tomboy (1921) - The Police Force
- Big Town Ideas (1921) - Chef
- Children of the Night (1921) - Tankerton
- Lovetime (1921) - Count de Baudine
- Queenie (1921) - Simon Pepper / Abner Quigley
- Cinderella of the Hills (1921) - Peter Poff
- The Jolt (1921) - Georgette's Father
- Gleam O'Dawn (1922) - Pierre
- Winning with Wits (1922) - Stage manager
- Extra! Extra! (1922) - Jim Rogers
- The Glory of Clementina (1922) - Vandemeer
- Honor First (1922) - Tricot (the Apache)
- The Cub Reporter (1922) - Mandarin
- Youth Must Have Love (1922) - Austin Hibbard
- The Last Hour (1923) - Quales
- Soft Boiled (1923) - The Reformer
- The Hunchback of Notre Dame (1923) - Minor Role (uncredited)
- The Dangerous Maid (1923) - Jewars (Jeffreys' secretary)
- Little Robinson Crusoe (1924) - 'Singapore' Scroggs
- Young April (1926) - Flower vendor (uncredited)
- The Winning of Barbara Worth (1926) - Barber (uncredited)
- What Price Glory? (1926) - Waiter at Cafe (uncredited)
- The Silent Avenger (1927) - Dave Wade
- Mountains of Manhattan (1927) - Jim Tully
- Sunrise: A Song of Two Humans (1927) - Money Lender (uncredited)
- Uncle Tom's Cabin (1927) - Bidder at Eliza's Auction (uncredited)
- Ladies Must Dress (1927) - Office Manager
- A Girl in Every Port (1928) - Bartender in Marseille (uncredited)
- The Phantom of the Turf (1928) - The Lawyer
- Big News (1929) - Coroner
- Woman Trap (1929) - Detective Captain
- Dangerous Paradise (1930) - Zangiacomo
- Officer O'Brien (1930) - Patello's Attorney (uncredited)
- Strictly Unconventional (1930) - George - Ted's Valet (uncredited)
- Love in the Rough (1930) - Brown
- Paid (1930) - Max Hardy (uncredited)
- The Front Page (1931) - Sheriff Hartman
- Ladies' Man (1931) - H.J. Dargen (Jeweler) (uncredited)
- Sweepstakes (1931) - Mr. Emory
- Wicked (1931) - Juryman
- Night Life in Reno (1931) - Adrian Garrett
- Flying High (1931) - Lunch Counter Manager (uncredited)
- Her Majesty, Love (1931) - Uncle Cornelius
- The Sea Ghost (1931) - Henry Sykes
- Under Eighteen (1931) - A.J. Dietrich, Attorney (uncredited)
- The Beast of the City (1932) - Coroner (uncredited)
- The Wet Parade (1932) - Charles Evans Hughes Campaigner (uncredited)
- Amateur Daddy (1932) - William J. 'Bill' Hansen
- The Famous Ferguson Case (1932) - County Attorney
- Winner Take All (1932) - Ben Isaacs
- The Purchase Price (1932) - Elmer, the Justice of the Peace (uncredited)
- Jewel Robbery (1932) - Prefect of Police
- Love Me Tonight (1932) - Shirtmaker (uncredited)
- Down to Earth (1932) - Ed Eggers
- The All American (1932) - Football Game Spectator (uncredited)
- The Phantom of Crestwood (1932) - Jenny's Apartment House Manager
- The Sport Parade (1932) - Toastmaster
- The Penguin Pool Murder (1932) - Bertrand B. Hemingway
- Flaming Guns (1932) - J.P. Mulford
- Rasputin and the Empress (1932) - Minor Role (uncredited)
- 20,000 Years in Sing Sing (1932) - Morris - Finn's Lawyer (uncredited)
- The Mysterious Rider (1933) - Gentry, the Barber
- Smoke Lightning (1933) - Deputy Jake Tully
- Pick-Up (1933) - Sam Foster
- The Keyhole (1933) - J. Weems - Acme Detective Agency Head (uncredited)
- Terror Aboard (1933) - Ship's Doctor
- Bondage (1933) - Dr. I. M. Harper (uncredited)
- The Girl in 419 (1933) - Walter C. Horton
- Storm at Daybreak (1933) - Captain Durosch (uncredited)
- A Shriek in the Night (1933) - Perkins - Editor
- Her First Mate (1933) - Dr. Gray (uncredited)
- Tillie and Gus (1933) - Phineas Pratt
- Day of Reckoning (1933) - Bail Bondsman (uncredited)
- Blood Money (1933) - Judge (uncredited)
- Roman Scandals (1933) - Boggs - the Museum Keeper (uncredited)
- King for a Night (1933) - Mr. Whistler
- Lady Killer (1933) - Lawyer (uncredited)
- Son of Kong (1933) - Peterson - Hilda's Father (uncredited)
- Nana (1934) - Financial Backer (uncredited)
- I Like It That Way (1934) - The Professor
- Viva Villa! (1934) - Jail Official (uncredited)
- Unknown Blonde (1934) - Max Keibel
- Love Birds (1934) - Blewitt
- Hollywood Party (1934) - Scientific Pedant (uncredited)
- Half a Sinner (1934) - Collector
- Now I'll Tell (1934) - Attorney Joe Davis
- Operator 13 (1934) - Josiah Claybourne (uncredited)
- The Old Fashioned Way (1934) - Sheriff Prettywillie (uncredited)
- Bachelor Bait (1934) - District Attorney Clement Graftsman
- Beyond the Law (1934) - Talbot
- The Count of Monte Cristo (1934) - Fouquet
- Servants' Entrance (1934) - Employment Agent (uncredited)
- The Lemon Drop Kid (1934) - Martin Potter
- Wake Up and Dream (1934) - Hildebrand
- A Successful Failure (1934) - H.T. Flintly, News Record Editor
- 6 Day Bike Rider (1934) - Mr. Hemmings (uncredited)
- Gridiron Flash (1934) - Constable Hunsacker (uncredited)
- Imitation of Life (1934) - Mr. Bristol, Landlord (uncredited)
- Kentucky Kernels (1934) - Lawyer Peck (uncredited)
- Evelyn Prentice (1934) - Public Defender (uncredited)
- I'll Fix It (1934) - John Stevens
- Shrimps for a Day (1934, Short) - Mr. Crutch
- Forsaking All Others (1934) - Hotel Manager (uncredited)
- The Winning Ticket (1935) - Dolan - Pool Hall Proprietor (uncredited)
- When a Man's a Man (1935) - Garvey - Gambert's Lawyer
- Ruggles of Red Gap (1935) - Jake Henshaw
- The Whole Town's Talking (1935) - Head of Chamber of Commerce (uncredited)
- The Great Hotel Murder (1935) - Girando
- A Dog of Flanders (1935) - Antoine - Official with Court Order (uncredited)
- One Frightened Night (1935) - Mr. Felix
- Let 'Em Have It (1935) - Reynolds (uncredited)
- Lady Tubbs (1935) - Country Hick (uncredited)
- Mad Love (1935) - Piano Creditor (uncredited)
- Champagne for Breakfast (1935) - Raeburn
- Bright Lights (1935) - Train Station Clerk (uncredited)
- Navy Wife (1935) - Bridge Player (uncredited)
- His Night Out (1935) - Trimble (uncredited)
- Waterfront Lady (1935) - Truant Officer
- It's in the Air (1935) - Amos Whipple
- The Rainmakers (1935) - Hogan (uncredited)
- Little Sinner (1935, Short) - the Property owner
- Splendor (1935) - Process Server (uncredited)
- I Dream Too Much (1935) - The Lawyer (uncredited)
- Paddy O'Day (1936) - Lawyer Brewster (uncredited)
- Timothy's Quest (1936) - Mr. Simpson (uncredited)
- It's Up to You (1936) - Henry
- Sutter's Gold (1936) - Streetcar Owner (uncredited)
- Educating Father (1936) - Jess Boynton
- Little Miss Nobody (1936) - Herman Slade
- Pepper (1936) - Aeolian (uncredited)
- Love Begins at 20 (1936) - Jonathan Ramp
- Wedding Present (1936) - Simmons (uncredited)
- The Magnificent Brute (1936) - Burke (uncredited)
- The Case of the Black Cat (1936) - Mr. Shuster
- The Man I Marry (1936) - Farmer (uncredited)
- Hats Off (1936) - Mr. Pottingham
- Man of the People (1937) - Skinny Wilson - Sulker (uncredited)
- Outcast (1937) - Pawnbroker (uncredited)
- Two Wise Maids (1937) - Twitchell
- Maytime (1937) - Waiter (uncredited)
- A Star Is Born (1937) - Justice of the Peace (uncredited)
- Damaged Goods (1937) - Dr. N.R. Shryer
- Parnell (1937) - Assistant Process Server (uncredited)
- The Great Gambini (1937) - Doctor (uncredited)
- The Emperor's Candlesticks (1937) - Stationmaster (uncredited)
- Small Town Boy (1937) - Curtis French
- The Westland Case (1937) - Charles Frazee
- Nothing Sacred (1937) - Mr. Watson (uncredited)
- 45 Fathers (1937) - Grocer (uncredited)
- In Old Chicago (1938) - Lawyer
- Rebecca of Sunnybrook Farm (1938) - Jake Singer
- Kentucky Moonshine (1938) - Attorney
- Having Wonderful Time (1938) - Mr. G
- The Texans (1938) - Sam Ross (uncredited)
- You Can't Take It with You (1938) - John Blakely
- Freshman Year (1938) - Hoskins (uncredited)
- The Mad Miss Manton (1938) - Norris' Attorney (uncredited)
- Little Miss Broadway (1938)
- Son of Frankenstein (1939) - Dr. Berger (uncredited)
- Ambush (1939) - Lafe, Centerville Storekeeper (uncredited)
- I'm from Missouri (1939) - Dilson (uncredited)
- Let Us Live (1939) - Lunchroom Proprietor (uncredited)
- East Side of Heaven (1939) - Telegraph Operator (uncredited)
- Clown Princes (1939, Short) - The Farm Landlord
- Some Like It Hot (1939) - Mr. Ives
- Unmarried (1939) - Grocery Clerk (uncredited)
- Young Mr. Lincoln (1939) - Dr. Mason (scenes deleted)
- Quick Millions (1939) - Assayer
- Desperate Trails (1939) - Malenkthy Culp
- Drums Along the Mohawk (1939) - Paymaster (uncredited)
- Little Old New York (1940) - Willie Stout
- Millionaire Playboy (1940) - Mr. Jamison (uncredited)
- We Who Are Young (1940) - R. Glassford
- Haunted House (1940) - Eph, Service Station Owner
- Cherokee Strip (1940) - Barrett Lawyer (uncredited)
- Melody Ranch (1940) - Judge 'Skinny' Henderson
- Street of Memories (1940) - Professor (uncredited)
- Friendly Neighbors (1940) - Silas Barton
- Little Men (1940) - W.L. Reynolds (uncredited)
- Road Show (1941) - Sheriff (uncredited)
- Angels with Broken Wings (1941) - Sybil's Lawyer (uncredited)
- Come Back, Miss Pipps (1941, Short) - Alonzo K. Pratt (uncredited) (final film role)
