= You're Telling Me! =

1934 film by Erle C. Kenton

- Directed by: Erle C. Kenton
- Written by: Walter DeLeon; W.C. Fields; Paul M. Jones; J.P. McEvoy; Julian Leonard Street
- Based on: Mr. Bisbee's Princess by Julian Leonard Street
- Produced by: Emanuel Cohen; William LeBaron
- Starring: W.C. Fields; Larry "Buster" Crabbe; Joan Marsh; Adrienne Ames
- Cinematography: Alfred Gilks
- Edited by: Otho Lovering
- Music by: W. Franke Harling; Arthur Johnston; John Leipold; Tom Satterfield
- Distributed by: Paramount Pictures
- Release date: April 5, 1934
- Running time: 67 min.
- Country: United States
- Language: English

You're Telling Me! is a 1934 American pre-Code comedy film directed by Erle C. Kenton and starring W.C. Fields. It is a remake of the 1926 silent film So's Your Old Man, also starring Fields. Both films are adapted from the short story Mr. Bisbee’s Princess by Julian Leonard Street. It was released by Paramount Pictures.

== Plot ==
Sam Bisbee is an optometrist and amateur inventor. His daughter Pauline is in love with Bob Murchison, but Bob's upper-class mother disapproves of the Bisbee family. Sam's wife Bessie is ashamed of Sam because he prefers to act as himself rather than feigning sophistication. Pauline is the one woman who truly loves Sam, accepting her father as he is.

Sam receives a letter from a tire company expressing interest in one of his inventions, a puncture-proof tire that can resist bullets. However, his opportunity becomes a disaster when he mistakenly uses a police car as the subject of his demonstration. When the car's tires fail to resist Sam's bullets, he must flee the irate police.

On the train trip home, feeling that he has failed completely, Sam contemplates committing suicide by drinking a bottle of iodine, but decides against it at the last minute. On the train, he meets a woman who also has a bottle of iodine. Mistakenly thinking that she is also considering suicide, Sam tries to dissuade her by telling her about his own troubles. He does not know that she is Princess Lescaboura, engaged in agood-will tour of the area. She is moved by Sam's story and secretly decides to help him.

The next day, the Princess visits Sam's town and informs its residents that he once saved her life. As a result, the townspeople, including Mrs. Murchison, suddenly see Sam as admirable. Sam, believing the Princess is posing as royalty to help him, quietly congratulates her on her successful ruse.

At a new golf course, Sam is given the honor of driving the first ball. After a number of random events foil Sam's attempts to hit the ball, Mr. Robbins, the president of the tire company, arrives at the course. He excitedly tells Sam that they have found his car and tested his tires, and want to manufacture them. He offers Sam $20,000 for his invention, but the princess says that she wants the patent for her own country. She bids against Robbins until Robbins finally offers $1,000,000 plus a royalty for each tire, which Sam accepts.

Later, Sam's family is wealthy and respected, and his daughter Pauline is married to Bob. Sam is happy, but he still doesn't realize the Princess is genuine. As she is about to leave, she says, "Goodbye, Sam—I want to thank you for a lot of fun!” Sam says, "The pleasure's mutual," then leans closer and says, "We certainly put that princess stuff over, didn't we?" To which she replies, "You're telling me!"

== Cast ==
- W.C. Fields as Sam Bisbee, optometrist
- Adrienne Ames as Princess Lescaboura
- Joan Marsh as Pauline Bisbee
- Larry "Buster" Crabbe as Bob Murchison
- Louise Carter as Mrs. Bessie Bisbee
- Kathleen Howard as Mrs. Edward Quimby Murchison
- Del Henderson as Crystal Springs mayor Brown
- Nora Cecil as Mrs. Price, town's spinster
- George Irving as Mr. Robbins, president of National Tire Co.
- James B. "Pop" Kenton as Doc Beebe, Sam's friend
- Robert McKenzie as Charlie Bogle, Sam's friend
- Tammany Young as the Caddy

== Production ==
The sequence at the golf course is largely the routine that formed the nucleus of Fields' earlier short film The Golf Specialist. This was filmed at the Lakeside Golf Club in Burbank, California, which was also used in Fields' short The Dentist (1932 film).

The triumph of Fields' character over his circumstances, and the happy ending thanks to a windfall profit, would be repeated later in 1934 in It's a Gift.

The film received only a cursory review in William K. Everson's 1967 book The Art of W.C. Fields as it was unavailable because of ownership issues. The issues were resolved and the film is included in the Universal DVD set W.C. Fields Comedy Collection, Volume Two. Everson mentions that the name of the film's minor character Charlie Bogle was adopted as Fields' writing pseudonym for several of his later films.

== See also ==
- National Recovery Administration (NRA), the logo displayed at start of film
