= Tammany Young =

American actor (1886–1936)

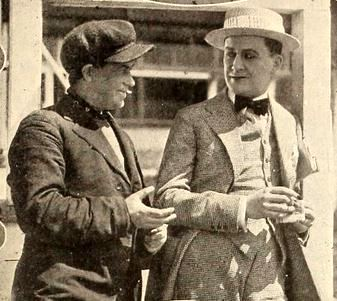
- Young and Thomas Carrigan in Checkers (1919)
- Born: September 9, 1886; New York City, U.S.
- Died: April 26, 1936 (aged 49); Hollywood, California, U.S.
- Years active: 1911–1936
- Spouse(s): May Young (?–1936; his death); Gertrude Savage (?–?)

Tammany Young (September 9, 1886 – April 26, 1936) was an American stage and film actor.

== Early life ==
Born in New York City, Young appeared on Broadway in The Front Page (1928) by Ben Hecht and The New Yorkers (1930) by Herbert Fields and Cole Porter. He was considered a "good luck actor" by Broadway producers. He was often cast in bit parts by the likes of The Shuberts, Jed Harris and David Belasco to bring luck to their productions. His reputation in the theater business was such that his likeness was drawn in caricature by Alex Gard for Sardi's restaurant. That picture is now part of the collection of the New York Public Library.

== Career ==
In Hollywood, Young started out in silent films and then was cast in talkies. He often played the stooge (straight man) to W.C. Fields, with whom he appeared in seven films: Sally of the Sawdust (1925), Six of a Kind (1934), You're Telling Me! (1934), The Old Fashioned Way (1934), It's a Gift (1934), Man on the Flying Trapeze (1935), and Poppy (1936), their last film appearance.

=== Gatecrashing ===
Young also had a reputation as a gate crasher. By claiming to be an ice man, he worked his way into the 1921 Dempsey–Carpentier prize fight in New Jersey, and in 1932 found his way into the Los Angeles Olympics. His exploits were frequently reported by sportswriters of the era.

== Death ==
After a long illness, Young died in his sleep on April 26, 1936 in Hollywood, California, at the age of 49. At the news of Young's death, W.C. Fields fell into a depression and stopped eating and sleeping.

== Partial filmography ==
- The Escape (1914)
- Driven by Fate (1915 short)
- The Foundling (1915)
- The Foundling (1916)
- The Lost Bridegroom (1916)
- Destiny's Toy (1916)
- The Big Sister (1916)
- The Great Secret (1917)
- The Racing Strain (1918)
- The Service Star (1918)
- A Regular Girl (1919)
- The Right Way (1921)
- Bits of Life (1921)
- The Man Who (1921)
- The Man Worth While (1921)
- Rainbow (1921)
- When the Desert Calls (1922)
- The Seventh Day (1922)
- John Smith (1922)
- Till We Meet Again (1922)
- The Heart of a Siren (1925)
- The White Monkey (1925)
- The Police Patrol (1925)
- Sally of the Sawdust (1925) (uncredited)
- The Wrongdoers (1925)
- Camille of the Barbary Coast (1925)
- The Unguarded Hour (1925)
- Womanhandled (1925)
- The Highbinders (1926)
- Blind Alleys (1927)
- The Perfect Sap (1927)
- Roadhouse Nights (1930)
- Follow the Leader (1930)
- The Kid from Spain (1932)
- She Done Him Wrong (1933)
- Hallelujah, I'm a Bum (1933)
- Gold Diggers of 1933 (1933) (uncredited)
- Tugboat Annie (1933)
- Six of a Kind (1934) (uncredited)
- You're Telling Me! (1934)
- The Old Fashioned Way (1934)
- It's a Gift (1934)
- The Mighty Barnum (1934)
- The Glass Key (1935)
- Man on the Flying Trapeze (1935)
- Little Big Shot (1935)
- Poppy (1936)

== See also ==
- Double act
- List of caricatures at Sardi's restaurant
