= Tillie and Gus =

1933 film by Francis Martin

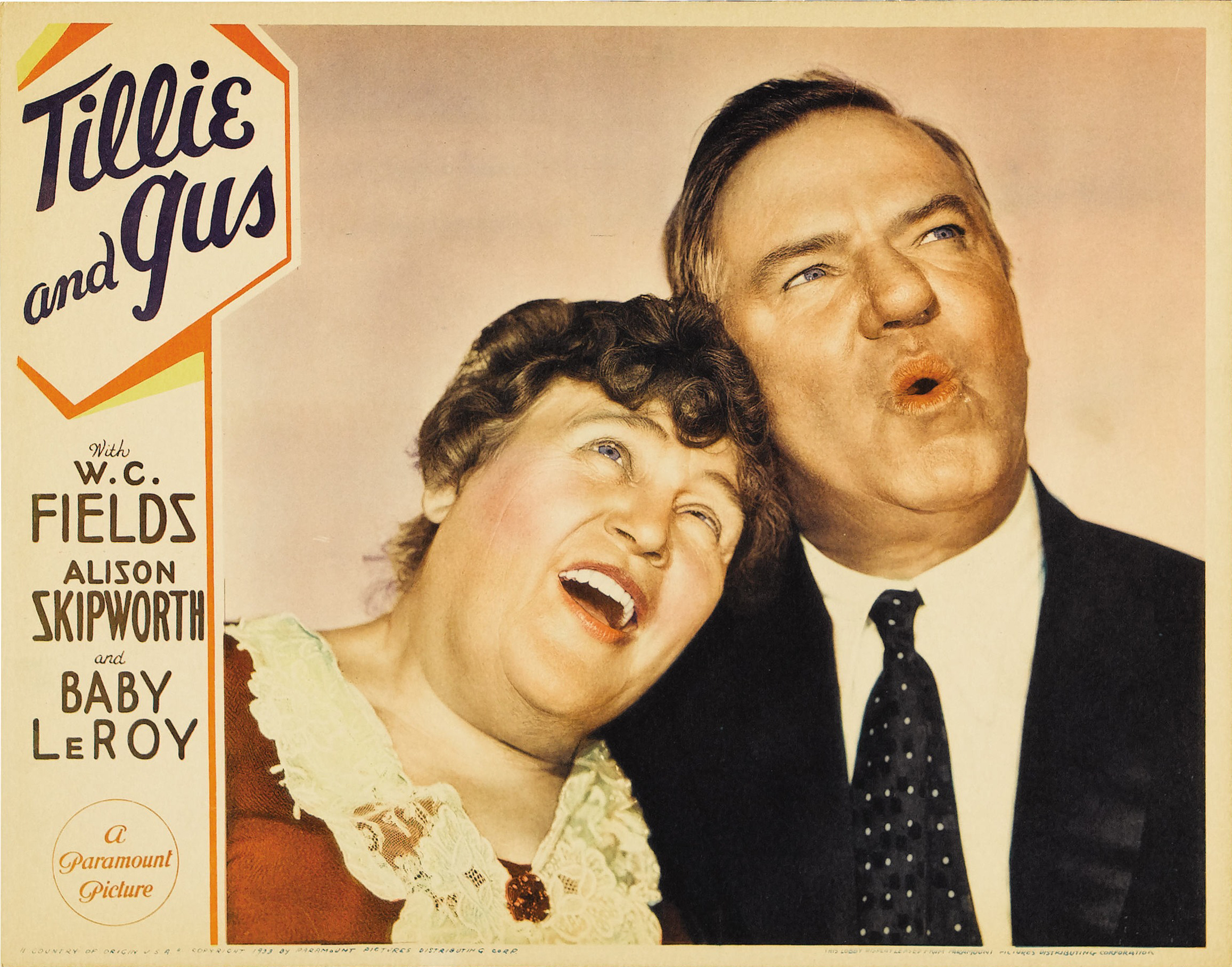
- lobby card
- Directed by: Francis Martin
- Screenplay by: Walter DeLeon; Francis Martin
- Produced by: Douglas MacLean
- Starring: W.C. Fields; Alison Skipworth; Baby LeRoy; Julie Bishop; Clarence Wilson
- Cinematography: Ben F. Reynolds
- Edited by: James Smith
- Production company: Paramount Pictures
- Distributed by: Paramount Pictures
- Release date: October 13, 1933
- Running time: 58 minutes
- Country: United States
- Language: English

Tillie and Gus is a 1933 American pre-Code comedy film directed by Francis Martin, co-written by Martin and Walter DeLeon, and starring W.C. Fields, Alison Skipworth, Baby LeRoy, Julie Bishop, and Clarence Wilson. It is based on a short story by Rupert Hughes entitled Don't Call Me Madame. The film was released on October 13, 1933, by Paramount Pictures.

== Plot ==
Tillie Winterbottom has just lost her waterfront saloon in Shanghai, China in a dice game, and her ex-husband Gus is on trial for murder in Lone Gulch, Alaska, when they each receive word that Tillie's brother has died. Gus escapes and the two reunite in Seattle, then head for Danville to investigate the dead man's estate and the possibility of an inheritance.

Local Danville attorney Phineas Pratt claims the man died in debt, but he actually has swindled his daughter Mary Sheridan out of her rightful inheritance, including the family home, forcing her to move with her husband Tom Sheridan and their infant son, King to a dilapidated ferry called the Fairy Queen—supposedly the one item left of the estate.

When Tillie and Gus arrive in Danville, they are mistaken for missionaries newly returned from Africa by their relatives. Tillie plans to sell the boat and split the profits, but they become suspicious when Pratt expresses an inordinate interest in acquiring the seemingly unseaworthy boat, and they decide to help Mary and Tom refurbish it. Pratt, who has just purchased his own boat, the Keystone, tries to eliminate the competition by convincing the state inspection board to deny the Sheridans a ferry franchise.

It is decided that the outcome of a Fourth of July boat race will determine who is awarded the franchise. Comic mayhem ensues when Gus does everything in his power to sabotage their rival, ultimately coming out ahead in the end. Tom tells Gus, "That ferryboat race was the world's biggest gamble," to which Gus replies, "Well, don't forget, Lady Godiva put everything she had on a horse!"

== Cast ==
- W.C. Fields as Augustus Winterbottom
- Alison Skipworth as Tillie Winterbottom
- Baby LeRoy as The 'King'
- Julie Bishop as Mary Sheridan
- Phillip Trent as Tom Sheridan
- Clarence Wilson as Phineas Pratt
- George Barbier as Captain Fogg
- Barton MacLane as Commissioner McLennan
- Edgar Kennedy as Judge
- Robert McKenzie as Defense Attorney
- Ivan Linow as The Swede

== Critical reception ==
In his review in The New York Times, Mordaunt Hall described the film as "a cheery absurdity" and added, "Insane as are the doings in this concoction, they succeed in being really funny. It is the sort of thing admirably suited to Mr. Fields' peculiar genius." Time magazine observed, "Part parody of Tugboat Annie, part pure farce, Tillie and Gus is one of the pleasanter chapters in the long and happy career of W. C. Fields's famed unlighted cigar."
