= A Bedtime Story =

1933 film

- Theatrical release poster
- Directed by: Norman Taurog
- Written by: Benjamin Glazer; Roy Horniman (novel Bellamy The Magnificent); Nunnally Johnson; Waldemar Young (screenplay)
- Produced by: Ernest Cohen
- Starring: Maurice Chevalier; Helen Twelvetrees; Edward Everett Horton
- Cinematography: Charles Lang
- Edited by: Otho Lovering
- Music by: Karl Hajos (uncredited); John Leipold (uncredited); Ralph Rainger (uncredited)
- Distributed by: Paramount Pictures
- Release date: April 1933
- Running time: 87 minutes
- Country: United States
- Language: English/French

A Bedtime Story is a 1933 American pre-Code romantic comedy film starring Maurice Chevalier. The film was directed by Norman Taurog and also stars Edward Everett Horton, Helen Twelvetrees, and Baby LeRoy (in his film debut, as the baby).

== Plot ==
Chevalier plays a Parisian playboy who finds himself obliged to care for an abandoned baby.

== Cast ==
- Maurice Chevalier as Monsieur Rene
- Helen Twelvetrees as Sally
- Edward Everett Horton as Victor Dubois
- Adrienne Ames as Paulette
- Baby LeRoy as Monsieur "Baby"
- Earle Foxe as Max de l'Enclos
- Leah Ray as Mademoiselle Gabrielle
- Betty Lorraine as Suzanne Dubois
- Gertrude Michael as Louise
- Ernest Wood as Robert
- Reginald Mason as General Louse's Father
- Henry Kolker as Agent de Police
- George MacQuarrie as Henry Joudain
- Paul Panzer as Concierge
- Frank Reicher as Aristide
- George Barbier as Toy Seller
- Florence Roberts as Flower Shop Customer (uncredited)

== Production problem ==
The film was notable for the performance of Baby LeRoy, a one-year-old who had been selected from an orphanage by Chevalier and Taurog for his charming appeal. When certain scenes needed to be re-shot, they found that the baby had grown two front teeth, even though the later scenes would be showing the bare gums. There was no way round this.

== Release ==
The film opened in the week ended April 22, 1933 in Boston, Buffalo, Chicago, Los Angeles and Minneapolis, with grosses totalling $90,900 for the week.
