= Baby LeRoy =

American child actor

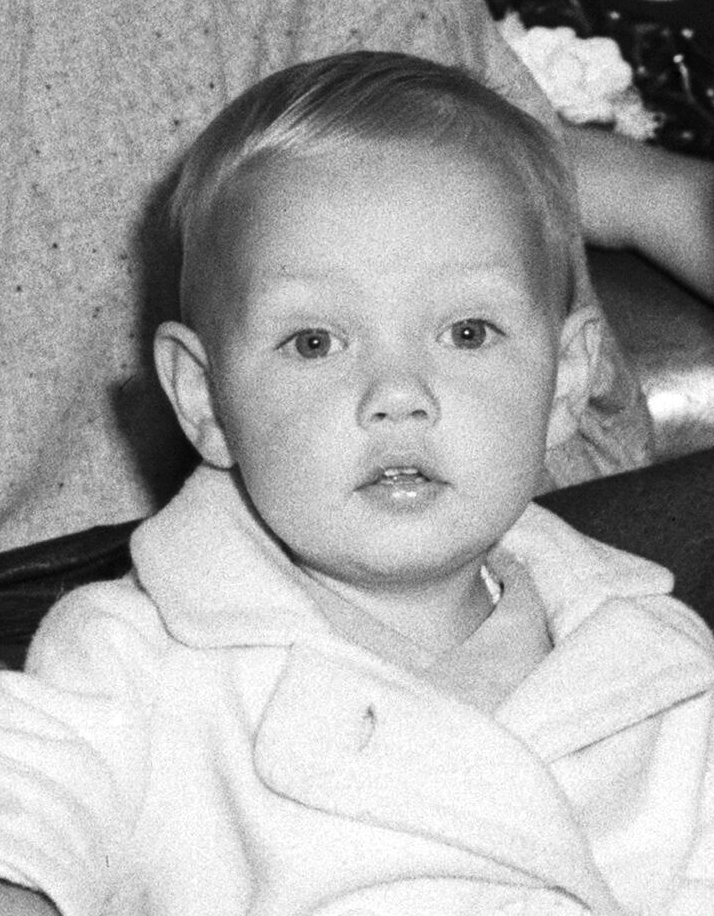
- LeRoy at the signing of his contract, 1933
- Born: Ronald Le Roy Overacker; May 12, 1932; Los Angeles, California, U.S.
- Died: July 28, 2001 (aged 69); Van Nuys, California, U.S.
- Occupation: Child actor
- Years active: 1933–1935

Ronald Le Roy Overacker (May 12, 1932 – July 28, 2001), better known by his stage name Baby LeRoy, was an American child actor who appeared in films in the 1930s. When he was 16 months old, he became the youngest person ever put under term contract by a major studio.

Born in Los Angeles, California, Baby LeRoy's career began when he was less than one year old, co-starring with Maurice Chevalier in A Bedtime Story, and ended with a cameo role as himself in Cinema Circus (1937). He is best known for his appearances in three W. C. Fields films: Tillie and Gus (1933), The Old Fashioned Way (1934) and It's a Gift (1934).

== Screen interaction with W. C. Fields ==
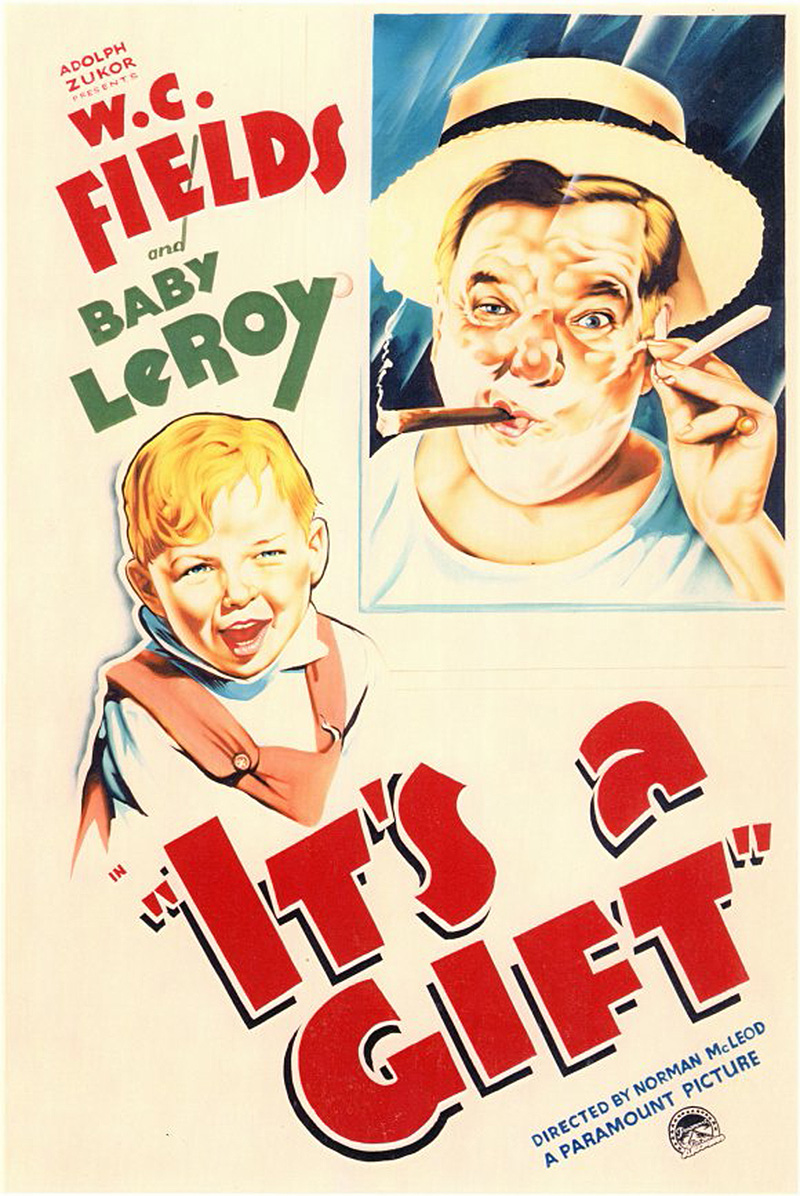
Baby LeRoy received second billing for the comedy It's a Gift.

Fields recounted a difficult shooting day during Tillie and Gus where a short scene was repeatedly ruined by Baby LeRoy's crying until he surreptitiously devised a solution: "I quietly removed the nipple from Baby LeRoy's bottle, dropped in a couple of noggins of gin, and returned it to Baby LeRoy. After sucking on the pacifier for a few minutes, he staggered through the scene like a Barrymore."

LeRoy is perhaps best remembered for a dinner table sequence in the W. C. Fields comedy The Old Fashioned Way (1934) in which he throws a handful of custard into the comedian's face, yanks on his nose, and destroys his pocket watch by tossing it into a bowl of molasses. Fields initially endures each of these indignities, but the scene ends with Fields spotting Baby LeRoy standing in a doorway and giving the toddler a kick to the rear end. The film's director, William Beaudine, reported that the kick got "the biggest laugh in the picture."

By the time of It's a Gift, Fields had wearied of the youngster, who was now getting second billing in the credits. "Fields had a phobia about the baby," said director Norman McLeod. "He not only hated infants in general, but he believed that Baby LeRoy was stealing scenes from him... He used to swear at the baby so much in front of the camera that I sometimes had to cut off the ends of the scenes in which they appeared." Whether or not this animosity was legitimate, it greatly contributed to the popular impression of Fields, as famously summed up by Leo Rosten at a 1939 testimonial event: "The only thing I can say about Mr. W. C. Fields, whom I have admired since the day he advanced upon Baby LeRoy with an icepick, is this: Any man who hates dogs and babies can't be all bad."

== End of career ==
A starring role in the 1940 film The Biscuit Eater was to have been LeRoy's comeback. But while filming the first scene on location, which called for LeRoy to swing across a lake on a rope, he fell into the water twice.

By the following day, he had lost his voice from a cold. As the entire crew was on location, the accident forced the director to choose between recasting or holding up production until he recovered. The director chose to recast, and the film became one of Billy Lee's best-remembered roles. LeRoy never appeared in another film.

Overacker became a merchant seaman and in 1957, as an adult, appeared as a guest challenger on the TV panel show To Tell the Truth. He died in Van Nuys, California in 2001, aged 69.

== Filmography ==
Year	Title	Role	Notes
1933	A Bedtime Story	Monsieur 'Baby'	
1933	Torch Singer	Bobby - Dora's Baby Year 1	
1933	Tillie and Gus	The 'King'	
1933	Alice in Wonderland	Joker	
1934	Miss Fane's Baby Is Stolen	Michael Fane	
1934	The Old Fashioned Way	Albert Pepperday	
1934	The Lemon Drop Kid	Wally Jr.	
1934	It's a Gift	Baby Dunk	
1935	It's a Great Life	Buddy	
1935	Babes in Hollywood	LeRoy	short

== Sources ==
- Curtis, James (2003), W. C. Fields: A Biography, Alfred A. Knopf Publishing.
- Holmstrom, John (1996). The Moving Picture Boy: An International Encyclopaedia from 1895 to 1995, Norwich, Michael Russell, p. 179.
- Dye, David (1988). Child and Youth Actors: Filmography of Their Entire Careers, 1914–1985. Jefferson, N.C.: McFarland & Co., p. 8.
- Lamparski, R. (1974), Whatever Became of ...: The New Fifth Series, Bantam Books: New York.
- Best, Marc (1971). Those Endearing Young Charms: Child Performers of the Screen, South Brunswick and New York: Barnes & Co., pp. 161–165.
- Zierold, Norman J. (1965). The Child Stars. New York: Coward-McCann.
- Willson, Dixie (1935). Little Hollywood Stars. Akron, Ohio, and New York: Saalfield Pub. Co.
