= The Lemon Drop Kid (1934 film) =

1934 film by Marshall Neilan

- Theatrical release poster
- Directed by: Marshall Neilan
- Screenplay by: Howard J. Green; J.P. McEvoy; Damon Runyon
- Based on: The Lemon Drop Kid by Damon Runyon
- Produced by: William LeBaron
- Starring: Lee Tracy; Helen Mack; William Frawley; Minna Gombell; Baby LeRoy; Kitty Kelly; Henry B. Walthall
- Cinematography: Henry Sharp
- Production company: Paramount Pictures
- Distributed by: Paramount Pictures
- Release date: September 28, 1934
- Running time: 71 minutes
- Country: United States
- Language: English

The Lemon Drop Kid is a 1934 American comedy drama film directed by Marshall Neilan and written by Howard J. Green, J.P. McEvoy and Damon Runyon. The film stars Lee Tracy, Helen Mack, William Frawley, Minna Gombell, Baby LeRoy, Kitty Kelly and Henry B. Walthall. It was released on September 28, 1934, by Paramount Pictures.

== Plot ==
Con artist and racetrack tout Wally Brooks hands a lemon drop to a man in a wheelchair, promising that it will cure whatever ails him, and then persuades the man, a millionaire named Griggsby, to bet $100 on a horse. Wally knows that the horse cannot win and intends to pocket the stake. However, when the horse does win, Wally and his partner Dunhill, known as "The Professor", flee before Griggsby can find them and collect his winnings.

Hiding at an obscure location, Wally meets town drunk Jonas Deering and his beautiful daughter Alice. A love affair blossoms and Wally marries Alice. When she is about to give birth and has serious medical problems, Wally needs money, so he robs Mr. Potter, her boss. Alice dies in childbirth.

A despondent Wally shuns his own son, Wally Jr., and is not sure where to turn next. The Professor marries longtime girlfriend Maizie and offers to raise Wally Jr. Griggsby appears, claiming that the lemon drop did help his arthritis. He volunteers to become Wally Jr.'s legal guardian and gives Wally some money, with the amount that he would have won on the horse deducted.

== Cast ==
- Lee Tracy as Wally Brooks
- Helen Mack as Alice Deering
- William Frawley as William Dunhill
- Minna Gombell as Maizie
- Baby LeRoy as Wally Jr.
- Kitty Kelly as Cora Jennings
- Henry B. Walthall as Jonas Deering
- Robert McWade as Mr. Griggsby
- Clarence Wilson as Martin Potter
- Charles C. Wilson as Warden
- Eddie Peabody as Banjo Player
- Edward LeSaint as Doctor
- Dell Henderson as Judge Forrest

== Reception ==
In a contemporary review for The New York Times, critic Frank S. Nugent called The Lemon Drop Kid "no Man o' War" and wrote: "It breaks its stride trying to go the full feature distance and its pedigree is open to suspicion. But the spectator who follows its course down the projection room is reasonably sure of enjoying a few good chuckles and finding himself watching the goat with interest most of the way. ... As is true of all Runyon yarns, the plot is not as important as its characters and the picture adds a few new portraits to the Runyon film album."
