= W. C. Fields =

American comedian, actor, juggler and writer (1880–1946)

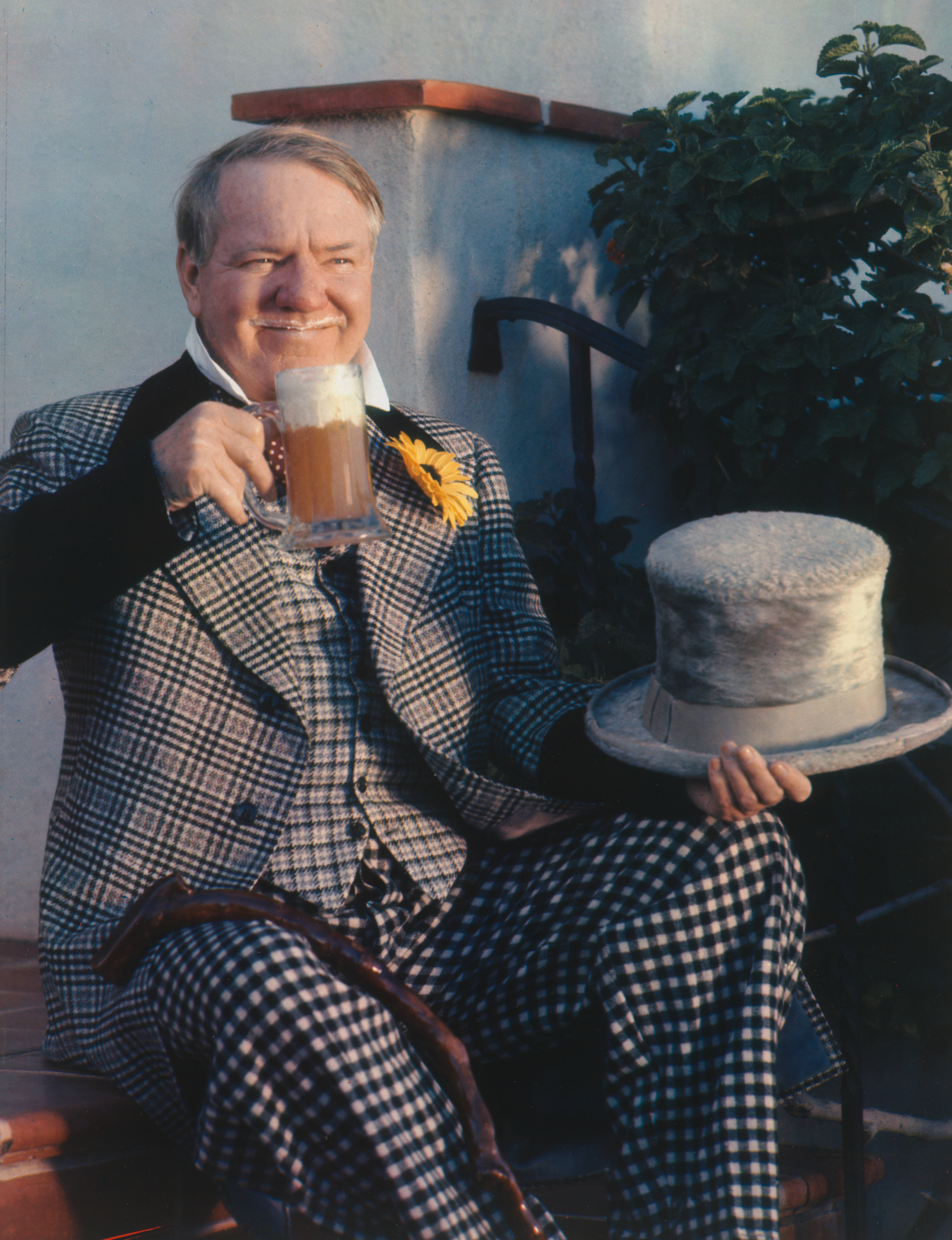
- W. C. Fields in 1938
- Born: William Claude Dukenfield; January 29, 1880; Darby, Pennsylvania, U.S.
- Died: December 25, 1946 (aged 66); Pasadena, California, U.S.
- Resting place: Forest Lawn Memorial Park, Glendale, California, U.S.
- Other names: Charles Bogle; Otis Criblecoblis; Mahatma Kane Jeeves
- Occupations: Actor; comedian; juggler; writer
- Years active: 1898–1946
- Spouse: Harriet Hughes (m. 1900)
- Partner(s): Bessie Poole (1916–1926); Carlotta Monti (1933–1946; his death)
- Children: 2
- Website: wcfields.com

William Claude Dukenfield (January 29, 1880 – December 25, 1946), better known as W. C. Fields, was an American actor, comedian, juggler and writer. His career in show business began in vaudeville, where he attained international success as a silent juggler. He began to incorporate comedy into his act and was a featured comedian in the Ziegfeld Follies for several years. He became a star in the Broadway musical comedy Poppy (1923), in which he played a colorful small-time con man. His subsequent stage and film roles were often similar scoundrels or henpecked everyman characters.

Among his trademarks were his physical comedy, raspy drawl, large nose, and grandiloquent vocabulary. His film and radio persona was generally identified with Fields himself. It was maintained by the publicity departments at Fields's studios (Paramount and Universal) and was further reinforced by Robert Lewis Taylor's 1949 biography W. C. Fields, His Follies and Fortunes. Beginning in 1973, with the publication of Fields's letters, photos, and personal notes in grandson Ronald Fields's book W. C. Fields by Himself, it was shown that Fields was married (and subsequently estranged from his wife), financially supported their son and loved his grandchildren.

== Early years ==
Fields was born William Claude Dukenfield in Darby, Pennsylvania, the oldest child of a working-class family. His father, James Lydon Dukenfield (1841–1913), was from an English family that emigrated from Sheffield, Yorkshire, England, in 1854. James Dukenfield served in Company M of the 72nd Pennsylvania Infantry Regiment in the American Civil War and was wounded in 1863. Fields's mother, Kate Spangler Felton (1854–1925), was a Protestant of British ancestry. The 1876 Philadelphia City Directory lists James Dukenfield as a clerk. After marrying, he worked as an independent produce merchant and a part-time hotel-keeper.

Claude Dukenfield (as he was known among his family) had a volatile relationship with his short-tempered father. He ran away from home repeatedly, beginning at the age of nine, often to stay with his grandmother or an uncle. His education was sporadic and did not progress beyond grade school. At age 12 he worked with his father, selling produce from a wagon, until the two had a fight that resulted in Fields running away once again. In 1893, he worked briefly at the Strawbridge and Clothier department store, and in an oyster house.

Fields later embellished stories of his childhood, depicting himself as a runaway kid nicknamed Whitey, who lived by his wits on the streets of Philadelphia from an early age, but his home life is believed to have been reasonably happy. He had already discovered in himself a facility for juggling, and a performance he witnessed at a local theater inspired him to dedicate substantial time to perfecting his juggling. At age 17, he was living with his family and performing a juggling act at church and theater shows.

In 1904 Fields's father visited him for two months in England while he was performing there in music halls. Fields enabled his father to retire, purchased him a summer home, and encouraged his parents and siblings to learn to read and write so they could communicate with him by letter.

== Entry into vaudeville ==
Inspired by the success of the "Original Tramp Juggler", James Edward Harrigan, Fields adopted a similar costume of scruffy beard and shabby tuxedo and entered vaudeville as a genteel "tramp juggler" in 1898, using the name W. C. Fields. His family supported his ambitions for the stage and saw him off on the train for his first stage tour. To conceal a stutter, Fields did not speak onstage. In 1900, seeking to distinguish himself from the many "tramp" acts in vaudeville, he changed his costume and makeup and began touring as "The Eccentric Juggler". His juggling act is reproduced in some of his films, notably in the 1934 comedy The Old Fashioned Way.

Fields's first biographer Robert Lewis Taylor described a succession of dishonest, fly-by-night managers who victimized Fields while in his teens, which hardened Fields and made him more cautious, vigilant, and cynical about show-business people. Fields joined the Irwin Bros. Burlesquers, a touring troupe of variety artists under the management of Fred Irwin. Fields was pleased to find that Fred Irwin was actually reputable, respected by professionals and patrons alike. "Manager Fred Irwin has long been in high favor with the patrons of the People's [Playhouse] by reason of the excellent programme he invariably offers." That August 1899 quote from the Cincinnati Enquirer contains the earliest known mention of "W. C. Fields" as an entertainer; the 19-year-old juggler was listed fifth among the eight acts announced on Irwin's bill. The earliest surviving appraisal of his act dates from September 1899, where Fields is now listed first: "The prominent features of [Irwin's] bill are the finished work of W. C. Fields, the tramp juggler..." The Pittsburgh Commercial Gazette elaborated on the Irwin show, "W. C. Fields, the tramp juggler, being the drawing card. His makeup is ideal with that of the up-to-date tramp, and his juggling of rubber balls, hats, boxes, and various other articles, while the orchestra kept time with him, is a unique feature."

Fields left the Irwin ensemble in May 1900 and embarked on a solo career as a vaudeville headliner, "the world's greatest juggler." He lost no time in the attempt; by June he was starring at the prestigious Koster & Bial's Music Hall in New York City. By this time, he had stopped calling himself Claude and now answered to Bill.

He remained a headliner in North America and Europe, and toured Australia and South Africa in 1903. When Fields played for English-speaking audiences, he found he could get more laughs by adding muttered patter and sarcastic asides to his routines. According to W. Buchanan-Taylor, a performer who saw Fields's performance in an English music hall, Fields would "reprimand a particular ball which had not come to his hand accurately" and "mutter weird and unintelligible expletives to his cigar when it missed his mouth".

== Broadway ==
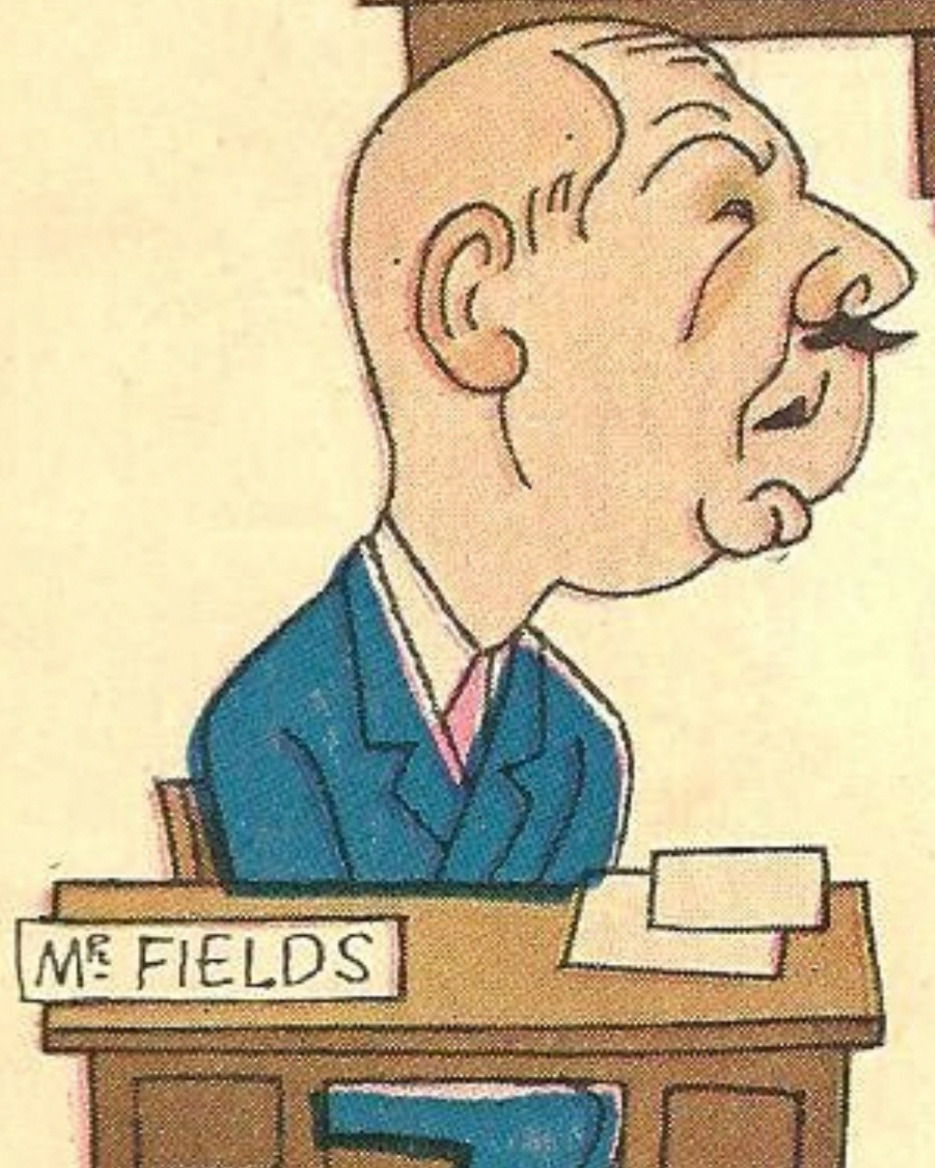
Caricature by Ralph Barton, 1925

In 1905 Fields made his Broadway debut in a musical comedy, The Ham Tree. His role in the show required him to deliver lines of dialogue, which he had never before done onstage. He later said, "I wanted to become a real comedian, and there I was, ticketed and pigeonholed as merely a comedy juggler." In 1913 he performed on a bill with Sarah Bernhardt, (who regarded Fields as "an artiste [who] could not fail to please the best class of audience"), first at the New York Palace and then in England in a royal performance for George V and Queen Mary. He continued touring in vaudeville until 1915.

Beginning in 1915, he appeared on Broadway in Florenz Ziegfeld's Ziegfeld Follies revue, delighting audiences with a wild billiards skit complete with bizarrely shaped cues and a custom-built table used for a number of hilarious gags and surprising trick shots. His pool game is reproduced in part in some of his films, notably in Six of a Kind in 1934. The act was a success, and Fields starred in the Follies from 1916 to 1922, not as a juggler but as a comedian in ensemble sketches. In addition to many editions of the Follies, Fields starred in the 1923 Broadway musical comedy Poppy, wherein he perfected his persona as a colorful small-time con man. In 1928, he appeared in The Earl Carroll Vanities.

His stage costume from 1915 onward featured a top hat, cut-away coat and collar, and a cane. The costume had a remarkable similarity to that of the comic strip character Ally Sloper, who may have been the inspiration for Fields's costume, according to Roger Sabin. The Sloper character may in turn have been inspired by Dickens's Mr Micawber, whom Fields later played on film.

== Fields versus "Nibblers" ==
In the early years of his career, Fields became highly protective of his intellectual properties that formed his acts and defined his on-screen persona. In vaudeville, burlesque, and in the rapidly expanding motion picture industry, many of his fellow performers and comedy writers often copied or "borrowed" sketches or portions of routines developed and presented by others. As his popularity with audiences continued to rise after 1915, following his initial work in films, other entertainers started to adopt and integrate parts of his successful acts into their own performances. In 1918, he began to combat this by registering his sketches and other comedy material with the Copyright Office of the Library of Congress in Washington, D.C.

Nevertheless, the practice continued and became so frequent by 1919 that he felt "compelled" to place a prominent warning that year in the June 13 issue of Variety, the most widely read trade paper at the time. Addressed to "Nibblers" and "indiscreet burlesque and picture players", his notice occupies nearly half a page in the paper. In it, he cautions fellow performers that all of his "acts (and businesses therein) are protected by United States and International copyright", stressing that he and his attorneys in New York and Chicago will "vigorously prosecute all offenders in the future". The concluding attribution, "W. C. Fields", is printed in such large letters that it dominates the two-page spread in the publication.

Fields's prominent warning to "Nibblers" in the June 13, 1919, issue of Variety threatened legal action against anyone using his material

Fields continued personally and with legal counsel to protect his comedy material during the final decades of his career, especially with regard to that material's reuse in his films. For example, he copyrighted his original stage sketch "An Episode at the Dentist's" three times: in January 1919 and twice again in 1928, in July and August. Later, 13 years after its first copyright registration, that same sketch continued to serve Fields as a framework for developing his already noted short The Dentist. He also copyrighted his 1928 sketch "Stolen Bonds", which in 1933 was translated into scenes for his esoteric satire The Fatal Glass of Beer. Other examples of Fields's stage-to-film use of his copyrighted material is the previously discussed 1918 Follies sketch "An Episode on the Links" and its recycling in both his 1930 short The Golf Specialist and in his feature You're Telling Me! in 1934. "The Sleeping Porch" sketch that reappears as an extended segment in It's a Gift was copyrighted as well by Fields in 1928. A few more of his copyrighted creations include "An Episode of Lawn Tennis" (1918), "The Mountain Sweep Steaks" (1919), "The Pullman Sleeper" (1921), "Ten Thousand People Killed" (1925), and "The Midget Car" (1930).

The total number of sketches created by Fields over the years, both copyrighted and uncopyrighted, remains undetermined, but may exceed 100. Between 1918 and 1930, he applied for and received 20 copyrights covering 16 of his most important sketches, which Fields biographer Simon Louvish has described as the "bedrock" upon which he built his stage career and then prolonged that success through his films.

== Personal life ==
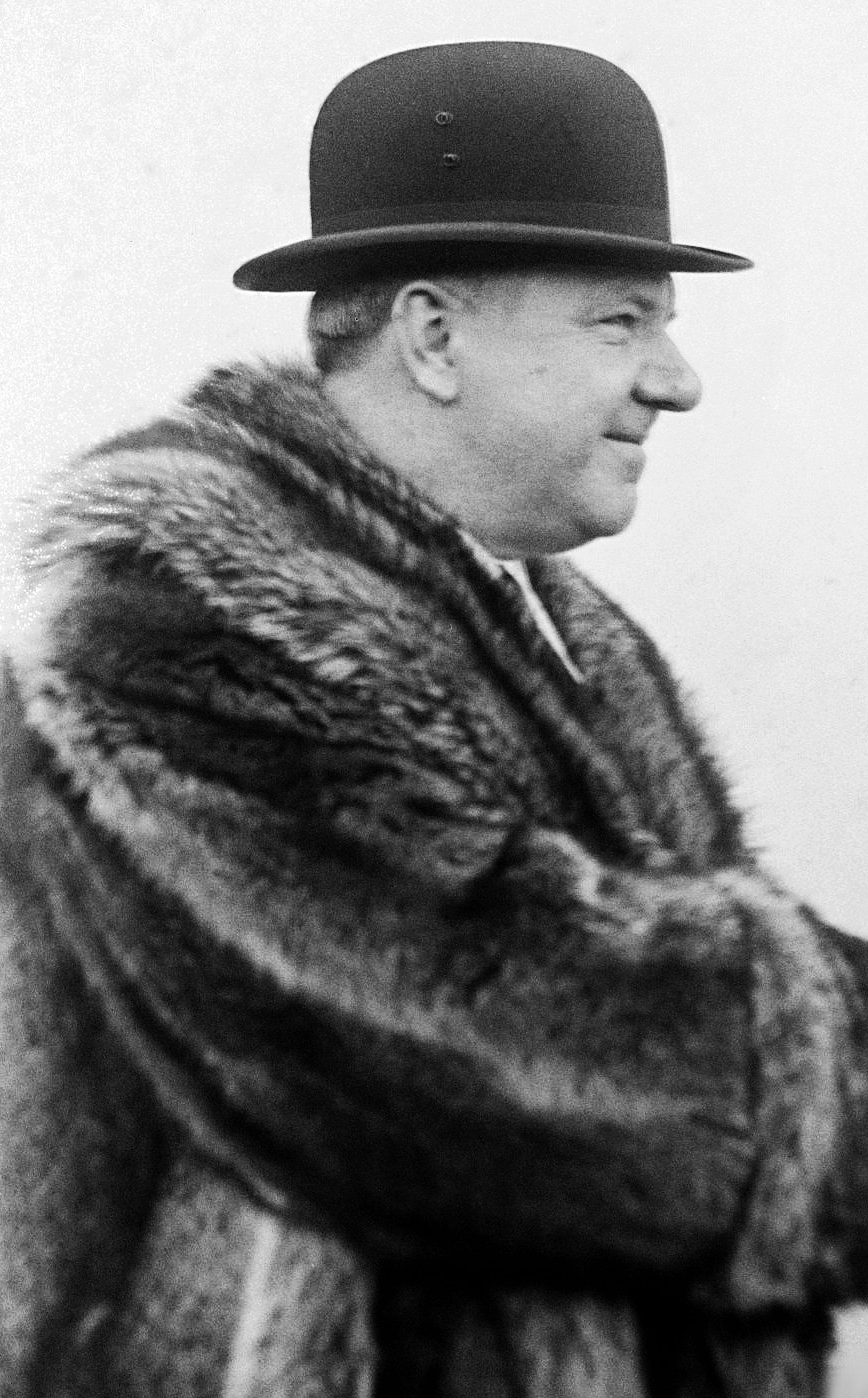
W.C. Fields photographed at an unknown date

Fields married a fellow vaudevillian, chorus girl Harriet "Hattie" Hughes (1879–1963), on April 8, 1900. She became part of Fields's stage act, appearing as his assistant, whom he would blame entertainingly when he missed a trick. Hattie was educated and she tutored Fields in reading and writing during their travels. Under her influence, he became an enthusiastic reader and traveled with a trunk of books, including grammar texts, translations of Homer and Ovid, and works by authors ranging from Shakespeare to Dickens to Twain and P. G. Wodehouse.

The couple had a son, William Claude Fields Jr. (1904–1971) and although Fields was an atheist—who, according to James Curtis, "regarded all religions with the suspicion of a seasoned con man"—he yielded to Hattie's wish to have their son baptized.

By 1907, he and Hattie had separated; she had been pressing him to stop touring and settle into a respectable trade, but he was unwilling to give up show business. They never divorced. Until his death in 1946, Fields kept in regular contact with Hattie, mostly through letters, and voluntarily sent her a weekly stipend. Their correspondence would at times be tense. Fields accused Hattie of turning their son against him and of demanding more money from him than he could afford.

While performing in New York City at the New Amsterdam Theater in 1916, Fields met Bessie Poole, an established Ziegfeld Follies performer whose beauty and quick wit attracted him, and they began a relationship. With her, he had another son, William Rexford Fields Morris (1917–2014). Neither Fields nor Poole wanted to abandon touring to raise the child, who was placed in foster care with a childless couple of Bessie's acquaintance. Fields's relationship with Poole lasted until 1926. In 1927, he made a negotiated payment to her of $20,000 upon her signing an affidavit declaring that "W. C. Fields is NOT the father of my child". Poole died of complications of alcoholism in October 1928, and Fields contributed to their son's support until he was 19 years of age.

In 1933, Fields met Carlotta Monti (1907–1993) and the two began a sporadic relationship that lasted until his death. Monti had small roles in two of Fields's films and in 1971 published a memoir, W. C. Fields and Me, which was adapted into a motion picture, released by Universal Pictures in 1976. Fields was listed in the 1940 census as single and living at 2015 DeMille Drive (Cecil B. DeMille lived at 2000, the only other address on the street).

== Persona ==
Fields's screen character often expressed a fondness for alcohol, a prominent component of the Fields legend. During his early career as a juggler, Fields never drank at all because he wanted to remain sober while performing. Eventually, the loneliness of constant travel prompted him to keep liquor in his dressing room as an inducement for fellow performers to socialize with him on the road. Only after he became a Follies star and abandoned juggling did Fields begin drinking regularly. His role in Paramount Pictures' International House (1933), as an aviator with an unquenchable taste for beer, did much to establish Fields's popular reputation as a prodigious drinker. Studio publicists promoted this image, as did Fields himself in press interviews.

Fields kept this as part of his act, often working boozy remarks into his pictures. In Never Give a Sucker an Even Break (1941) he tells his niece, played by Gloria Jean: "I was in love with a beautiful blonde once, dear. She drove me to drink. That's the one thing I am indebted to her for." In My Little Chickadee (1940), his character said "Once, on a trek through Afghanistan, we lost our corkscrew... and were compelled to live on food and water for several days."

On movie sets, Fields shot most of his scenes in varying states of inebriation. During the filming of Tales of Manhattan (1942), he kept a vacuum flask with him at all times and frequently availed himself of its contents. Phil Silvers, who had a minor supporting role in the scene featuring Fields, described in his memoir what happened next:

One day the producers appeared on the set to plead with Fields: "Please don't drink while we're shooting—we're way behind schedule"... Fields merely raised an eyebrow. "Gentlemen, this is only lemonade. For a little acid condition afflicting me." He leaned on me. "Would you be kind enough to taste this, sir?" I took a careful sip—pure gin. I have always been a friend of the drinking man; I respect him for his courage to withdraw from the world of the thinking man. I answered the producers a little scornfully, "It's lemonade." My reward? The scene was snipped out of the picture.

In a testimonial dinner for Fields in 1939, the humorist Leo Rosten remarked of the comedian that "any man who hates dogs and babies can't be all bad". The line—which Bartlett's Familiar Quotations later erroneously attributed to Fields himself—was widely quoted, and reinforced the popular perception that Fields hated children and dogs. In reality, Fields was somewhat indifferent to dogs, but occasionally owned one. He was fond of entertaining the children of friends who visited him, and doted on his first grandchild, Bill Fields III, born in 1943. He sent encouraging replies to all of the letters he received from boys who, inspired by his performance in The Old Fashioned Way (1934), expressed an interest in juggling.

== Films ==
=== Silent era and first talkies ===
In 1915, Fields starred in two short comedies, Pool Sharks and His Lordship's Dilemma, filmed at the French company Gaumont's American studio in Flushing, New York. His stage commitments prevented him from doing more movie work until 1924, when he played a supporting role in Janice Meredith, a Revolutionary War romance starring Marion Davies. He reprised his Poppy role in a silent-film adaptation, retitled Sally of the Sawdust (1925), directed by D. W. Griffith for Paramount Pictures. On the basis of his work in that film and Griffith's subsequent production That Royle Girl, Paramount offered Fields a contract to star in his own series of feature-length comedies. His next starring role was in It's the Old Army Game (1926), which featured his friend Louise Brooks, who later starred in G. W. Pabst's Pandora's Box (1929) in Germany. Fields's 1926 film, which included a silent version of the porch sequence that would later be expanded in the sound film It's a Gift (1934), had only middling success at the box office. The following three films Fields made at Astoria, however—So's Your Old Man (1926, remade as You're Telling Me! in 1934), The Potters (1927), and Running Wild (1927—were successes on an increasing scale and gained Fields a growing following as a silent comedian. Running Wild was the most successful of these, with a final cost of $179,000 and bringing in domestic rentals of $328,000 and another $92,000 from overseas. Rivalry between Paramount studio executives B. P. Schulberg on the West Coast and William Le Baron on the East Coast led to the closure of the New York studio and the centralization of Paramount production in Hollywood. Running Wild was the last silent film Paramount made at Astoria. When the filming was completed on April 28, the remaining handful of personnel left on the lot were let go with two weeks' severance pay, and the studio went idle. Fields went immediately to Hollywood, where Schulberg teamed him with Chester Conklin for two features and loaned him and Conklin out for an Al Christie-produced remake of Tillie's Punctured Romance for Paramount release. All of these were commercial failures and are now lost; when producer Charles R. Rogers bought the rights to the Tillie property in 1932, he inherited the negative of the Fields version and the film went out of circulation permanently.

Fields wore a scruffy clip-on mustache in all of his silent films. According to film historian William K. Everson, he perversely insisted on wearing the conspicuously fake-looking mustache because he knew it was disliked by audiences.

=== Debut in talking pictures ===
In late 1929 W. C. Fields, then working in New York, tried to exercise the motion picture rights to his old stage sketch "The Family Ford", only to find that it had already been filmed as a Vitaphone short. Fields, determined that such unauthorized use would not happen again, arranged with nearby movie producer Lou Brock to make a talking picture of "An Episode on the Links." The film was made at the Ideal studio in Hudson Heights, New Jersey. Brock was releasing his films through RKO Radio Pictures, assuring national exposure for Fields, but Brock declined to hire Fields for additional films.

In 1931 Fields's Follies co-star Marilyn Miller was working for Warner Bros., and she prevailed upon the studio to hire Fields for her feature film, Her Majesty, Love (1931). Fields was noticed in the reviews but did not make enough of an impression to guarantee further film work.

Paramount hired him as a member of an ensemble of comedy players, in two feature films: Million Dollar Legs and If I Had a Million (both 1932). Fields was prominently featured in both but these were not starring vehicles, to which Fields was accustomed.

Fields, with his career stalling, asked his golfing buddy, pioneer comedy producer-director Mack Sennett, for work at the Sennett studio in any behind-the-scenes capacity. Sennett wanted Fields the performer, and they settled on Fields both acting and writing his own material. Four two-reel comedies resulted -- with Fields abandoning the fake mustache for good -- and Sennett released them through Paramount in 1932 and 1933.

These shorts, adapted with few alterations from Fields's stage routines and written entirely by himself, were described by Simon Louvish as "the 'essence' of Fields". The first of them, The Dentist, is unusual in that Fields portrays an entirely unsympathetic character: he cheats at golf, assaults his caddy, and treats his patients with unbridled callousness. William K. Everson wrote that the cruelty of this comedy made it "hardly less funny" but that "Fields must have known that The Dentist presented a serious flaw for a comedy image that was intended to endure", and Fields showed a somewhat warmer persona in his subsequent Sennett shorts.

The Sennett shorts found an audience and Fields regained his status as a comedy lead. Financial difficulties brought Sennett's releasing arrangement with Paramount to a close after only one year, and Paramount signed Fields for feature films.

=== Success in feature films ===
In the sound era, Fields appeared in 13 feature films for Paramount. The popular success of his next release, International House, established him as a major star. An outtake from the production -- with the set, props, and camera shaking visibly while the camera was rolling -- was allegedly the only film record of that year's Long Beach earthquake. Director Eddie Sutherland sent the film clip to Paramount News, which included the International House vignette in its weekly newsreel. The film was shown in theaters around the world. Sutherland had staged the entire episode as a publicity stunt for the movie.

Fields's 1934 classic It's a Gift includes another one of his earlier stage sketches, one in which he endeavors to escape his nagging family by sleeping on the back porch, where he is bedeviled by noisy neighbors and salesmen. That film, like You're Telling Me! (1934) and Man on the Flying Trapeze (1935), ended happily with a windfall profit that restored his standing in his screen families.

Beginning in 1933, a tongue-in-cheek revival of the 1844 temperance play The Drunkard—urging audience members to hiss the villain and cheer the hero—became a popular attraction in Los Angeles. Fields became a fan of the show and attended it frequently. He was so taken with it that he decided to make a film of it, starring himself. What emerged was The Old Fashioned Way (1934), starring Fields as the impresario of a small-time repertory troupe. Fields not only played the villain in the Drunkard sequence, but reprised his old juggling specialty for the camera under the direction of comedy specialist William Beaudine.

Fields, an avid reader, had hoped to appear in a film adaptation of one of Charles Dickens's works. In 1935, Fields achieved this ambition when he was cast as Mr. Micawber in the David O. Selznick production of David Copperfield, released by Metro-Goldwyn-Mayer.

Mississippi (1935) followed at Paramount, co-starring Bing Crosby and W. C. Fields, with an original score by Rodgers and Hart.

== Illness ==
Beginning in 1935, the strain of his busy film schedule and a succession of personal tragedies took a toll on Fields's health. He fell ill with influenza and back trouble requiring round-the-clock nursing in late June 1935, and then was emotionally shattered by the sudden deaths of two of his closest friends, Will Rogers on August 15 and Sam Hardy on October 16. The combination of these events provoked a complete breakdown for Fields that laid him up for nine months. He was gingerly approached the next year to recreate his signature stage role in Poppy for Paramount Pictures; he accepted but was very weak throughout the production and a double was often used in long shots. After filming was complete, he relapsed when he learned another close friend and screen partner, Tammany Young, had died in his sleep on April 26 at age 49. Losing three friends in less than a year sent Fields into a deep depression. He stopped eating, his back pain flared up, and his chronic lung congestion trouble returned with a vengeance, eventually turning into pneumonia. He would be in hospitals and sanitariums for various treatments until the summer of 1937.

In September 1937, Fields returned to Hollywood to appear in Paramount's variety show The Big Broadcast of 1938. Fields alone received star billing, with featured billing for Martha Raye, Dorothy Lamour, Bob Hope, Kirsten Flagstad, Tito Guizar, and the Shep Fields orchestra. Fields loathed working on the film and particularly detested the director, Mitchell Leisen, who felt the same way about Fields and thought him unfunny and difficult. ("He was the most obstinate, ornery son of a bitch I ever tried to work with" was Leisen's opinion.) The arguments between Fields and Leisen were so constant and intense during the five-month shoot that when the production concluded on November 15, 1937, Leisen suffered a heart attack. Fields tried to inject his own material into the scenes already written, but when Paramount issued an ultimatum to perform according to the shooting script, Fields refused and Paramount fired him. Fields's farewell film for Paramount received critical acclaim and earned an Oscar for best original song ("Thanks for the Memory"), but exhibitors and audiences were disappointed. "One of the poorest shows we have ever received from Paramount. Not one customer was satisfied." (C.M. Anderson, Tolley, North Dakota); "Named wrong. Should be 'Miscast.'" (Charles L. Fisk, Butler, Missouri). Fields remained bitter about the outcome: "When the picture is finished and my stuff proves to be the outstanding feature of the picture, what happens? I am given my congé and the director and the supervisor and the producer who are responsible for this $1,300,000 flop go calmly on their way, working for the studio making another picture. The star has flopped."

Now physically unable to work in films, Fields was off the screen for more than a year. During his absence, he recorded a brief speech for a radio broadcast. His familiar snide drawl registered so well with listeners that he quickly became a popular guest on network radio shows. Although his radio work was not as demanding as motion-picture production, Fields insisted on his established movie-star salary of $5,000 per week.

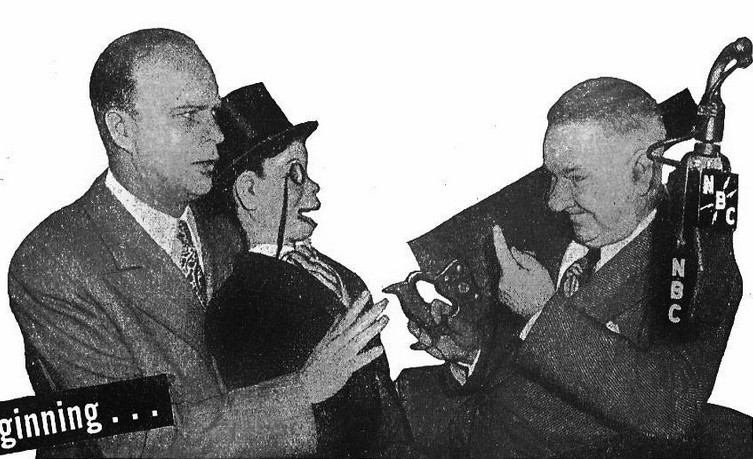
Edgar Bergen and Charlie McCarthy with Fields on The Chase and Sanborn Hour, c. 1945

He joined ventriloquist Edgar Bergen and Bergen's dummy Charlie McCarthy on The Chase and Sanborn Hour for weekly insult-comedy routines.

Fields would mock Charlie about his being made of wood:

Fields: Tell me, Charles, is it true your father was a gateleg table?

McCarthy: If it is, your father was under it!

When Fields referred to McCarthy as a "woodpecker's pinup boy" or a "termite's flophouse," Charlie would fire back at Fields about his drinking:

McCarthy: Is it true, Mr. Fields, that when you stood on the corner of Hollywood and Vine, 43 cars waited for your nose to change to green?

Another exchange:

Bergen: Why, Bill, I thought you didn't like children.

Fields: Oh, not at all, Edgar, I love children. I can remember when, with my own little unsteady legs, I toddled from room to room.

McCarthy: When was that, last night?

During his recovery from illness, in 1938, his son Claude got married. This effected a partial reconciliation with Fields's estranged wife and established a closer relationship with Claude. Fields was especially fond of Claude's wife, and was very happy to become a grandfather.

== Return to films ==
Fields's renewed popularity from his radio broadcasts with Bergen and McCarthy earned him a contract with Universal Pictures in 1939, brokered by promoter-producer Lester Cowan. The first feature for Universal, You Can't Cheat an Honest Man, was originally announced as an Edgar Bergen-Charlie McCarthy starring vehicle, with both names above the film title and Fields's name in much smaller type as a guest star. Fields dominated the action and stole the film, winning star billing in the process.

In 1940 he co-starred with Mae West in My Little Chickadee, which was awaited eagerly by movie fans. "The idea is hotter than a firecracker," Fields wrote in a personal letter, "but so many gilpins and muzzlers are trying to declare themselves in, the deal will most likely end up in the latrine." The studio loved the idea, as biographer James Curtis noted: "The idea of pairing the bombastic Whipsnade with the wisecracking Diamond Lil was the highest of high concepts, a surefire hit if there ever was one, and the management at Universal embraced it eagerly." The finished film did more for Fields than for West; the studio kept Fields working but wouldn't hire West for another picture.

Fields then starred in The Bank Dick (1940) as family man Egbert Sousé, who accidentally foils a bank robbery and becomes the bank's guard. His favorite haunt is The Black Pussy Cat Café, where he has the following exchange with the bartender (Shemp Howard):

Fields: Was I in here last night, and did I spend a $20 bill? [equal to him spending almost $500 today]

Shemp: Yeah.

Fields: Oh boy, what a load that is off my mind. I thought I'd lost it!

Fields fought with studio producers, directors, and writers over the content of his films. He was determined to make a movie his way, with his own script and staging, and his choice of supporting players. Universal finally gave him the chance, and the resulting film, Never Give a Sucker an Even Break (1941), was an absurd satire of Hollywood moviemaking. Fields appeared as himself, characterized as "The Great Man." Advance publicity named the film The Great Man before Universal adopted the final title. Fields personally recruited Universal's popular singing star Gloria Jean and his old cronies Leon Errol and Franklin Pangborn as his co-stars. The Universal management didn't like the sketchy screenplay and asked for rewrites, but director Eddie Cline filmed the rambling script as Fields conceived it, culminating in an incoherent string of blackout sketches. In an attempt to add structure to the film, Universal recut and reshot parts of the feature without Fields's participation. Both the film and Fields were released quietly in late 1941. Sucker was Fields's last starring film.

== Final years ==
Fields fraternized at his home with actors, directors and writers who shared his fondness for good company and good liquor. John Barrymore, Gene Fowler, and Gregory La Cava were among his close friends. On March 15, 1941, while Fields was out of town, Christopher Quinn, the two-year-old son of his neighbors, actor Anthony Quinn and his wife Katherine DeMille, drowned in a lily pond on Fields's property. Grief-stricken over the tragedy, he had the pond filled in.

Fields had a substantial library in his home. He studied theology and collected books on the subject despite being a staunch atheist. According to a popular story (possibly apocryphal, according to biographer James Curtis), actor Thomas Mitchell caught Fields reading a Bible. Mitchell asked what he was doing, and Fields replied, "Looking for loopholes."

In a 1994 episode of the Biography television series, Fields's 1941 co-star Gloria Jean recalled her conversations with Fields at his home. She described him as kind and gentle in personal interactions, and believed he yearned for the family environment he never experienced as a child.

During the 1940 presidential campaign, Fields authored a book, Fields for President, with humorous essays in the form of a campaign speech. Dodd, Mead and Company published it in 1940, with illustrations by Otto Soglow. The book was only mildly successful, and Fields was disappointed when the publishers decided against printing a second edition. In 1971, when Fields was seen as an anti-establishment figure, Dodd, Mead issued a reprint, minus the Soglow cartoons and now illustrated with photographs of author Fields.

Fields's film career slowed considerably in the 1940s. His declining health made studios and producers reluctant to insure him for feature-length productions, so he was now confined to brief guest appearances. An extended sequence in 20th Century-Fox's Tales of Manhattan (1942) was cut from the original release of the film and later reinstated for some home video releases. The scene featured a temperance meeting with society people at the home of a wealthy society matron, Margaret Dumont, in which Fields discovers that the punch has been spiked, resulting in drunken guests and a very happy Fields.

In a sudden burst of activity Fields signed for three films, all in preparation during 1943. In October of that year he ran through his pool table routine for the final time in Three Cheers for the Boys (released as Follow the Boys in May 1944), an all-star entertainment revue designed as a morale-booster for the armed forces. (Despite the charitable nature of the movie, Fields was paid $15,000 for this appearance; he was never able to perform in person for the armed services.) In Song of the Open Road, filmed during the late fall of 1943 and released in 1944, Fields juggled for a few moments and then remarked, "This used to be my racket."

In late 1943 Fields signed for a new movie-musical revue, Sensations. The Fields sequence was originally conceived as having Fields wrestle a trained bear, but this idea was abandoned in favor of a remake of Fields's old "Caledonian Express" stage sketch, where Fields meets a girl (Louise Currie) and appropriates a compartment on a railroad train. By the time filming started in January 1944, his vision and memory had deteriorated so much that he had to read his lines from large-print blackboards. Producer Andrew Stone remembered, "He'd come on at nine o'clock and he'd be all right for an hour, and then he couldn't remember anything." When the "Caledonian Express" sketch flopped at a preview, Stone decided to cut the uneventful Fields section out of the picture. Fields didn't want to lose the role and volunteered for retakes, where he was still on the train with Currie but now being bumped around by two drunks. Stone realized that Fields was no longer capable of carrying out comedy routines. Stone thought Fields was "a very honest man and a very nice guy [but] he'd lost all his timing. He just wasn't funny anymore." The film was retitled Sensations of 1945 (released in June 1944) and was W. C. Fields's final motion picture.

He continued to make guest appearances on radio, where he didn't have to memorize movie scripts. A notable guest appearance was with Frank Sinatra on Sinatra's CBS radio program on February 9, 1944. Fields also made several appearances on Command Performance, Armed Forces Radio's weekly broadcasts heard by military personnel.

Fields had let the condition of his rented house deteriorate, and the owner refused to renew the lease. Fields moved out in February 1944 and spent the rest of his life at the Las Encinas Sanatorium in Pasadena, California.

In late 1945 Fields's secretary Magda Michael, concerned that his agent wasn't finding enough work for him, arranged for Fields to appear on radio's Request Performance (a version of Command Performance for the general public). Fields performed "The Temperance Lecture" and "The Day I Drank a Glass of Water," both by comedy writer Bill Morrow. Fields's last radio appearance was on March 24, 1946, on NBC's Edgar Bergen and Charlie McCarthy Show.

Bill Morrow wanted to have Fields record the Request Performance monologues while the comedian, now in serious decline, was still able to function. Morrow arranged with his friend Les Paul, guitarist and recording engineer, to make the records at Paul's home studio, where Paul had installed a new multi-track recorder. The session took place in July 1946. Listening to one of Paul's experimental multi-track recordings, Fields remarked, "The music you're making sounds like an octopus. Like a guy with a million hands. I've never heard anything like it." Paul was amused, and named his new machine OCT, short for octopus.

After several false starts where Fields had trouble reading the scripts, Paul accommodated Fields by making up cue cards with much larger print. Then Fields sailed through the session. His delivery was noticeably slower than usual, but he still succeeded in doing funny and flavorful monologues about "demon rum." The session was released commercially in a three-disc album, with "The Temperance Lecture" on four sides and "The Day I Drank a Glass of Water" on two. The recording was his last performance. Morrow had arranged for Fields to appear on Bing Crosby's program, to be recorded on December 22, but Fields was too ill to work. Three days later -- early Christmas morning -- W. C. Fields died.

== Death ==
Carlotta Monti wrote that in his final moments, she used a garden hose to spray water onto the roof over his bedroom to simulate his favorite sound, falling rain. According to a 2004 documentary, he winked and smiled at a nurse, put a finger to his lips, and died. This poignant depiction is uncorroborated and "unlikely", according to biographer James Curtis. A more likely account was offered by Robert Lewis Taylor in 1949: "Late into the night of Christmas Eve, Fields's room was full of doctors and nurses [along with Carlotta Monti and his secretary Magda Michael]. Shortly before midnight, Miss Monti took his hand and began calling to him. While she pleaded, he opened his eyes and, noting the people in the room, put a finger to his lips and winked. A few minutes later, as bells over the city announced the arrival of Christmas morning, he suffered a violent hemorrhage of the stomach... he drew several long sighs, and lay still."

Some of Fields's professional friends and colleagues did not hear of his passing that day. Bob Hope emceed a two-hour Christmas special on radio. According to Modern Screen Magazine, "Every time he'd used a Fields likker gag on his show, Bill had always sent him a funny message the next day. So this time he brought in a couple of jokes ribbing Fields. After the broadcast Bob Hope learned [that] W. C. Fields had made his last exit. Never in the world would he have made a joke on Bill at that point if he'd known. A few days later Bob received a record album from W. C. Fields's secretary. A note explained: 'Before he died, Bill picked out the close friends he wanted to have this. I found your name on the list.'" It was his farewell performance, "The Temperance Lecture" and "The Day I Drank a Glass of Water."

Fields's funeral took place on January 2, 1947, in Glendale, California. His cremation, as directed in his will, was delayed pending resolution of an objection filed by Hattie and Claude Fields on religious grounds. After a delay of more than two years, Fields's remains were cremated on June 2, 1949, and his ashes interred at the Forest Lawn Memorial Park Cemetery in Glendale.

Hattie and Claude Fields also contested a clause leaving a portion of his estate to establish a "W. C. Fields College for Orphan White Boys and Girls, where no religion of any sort is to be preached"; a judge disallowed this bequest in December 1949. Fields's loyal secretary and executor Magda Michael, intent on carrying out her employer's wishes, fought for the bequest, which was reinstated in December 1950 in the form of a $25,000 donation to "some college in Los Angeles County" to benefit orphans.

The legal battles waged on, with Hattie Fields ultimately being awarded the bulk of the estate, with payments also made to Carlotta Monti, Fields's siblings Walter and Adele, and Fields's son by Bessie Poole. Magda Michael resigned as trustee in 1956, when the residue was nearly exhausted, and the estate of W. C. Fields was finally closed on January 16, 1963, 16 years after his death.

=== Gravestone ===
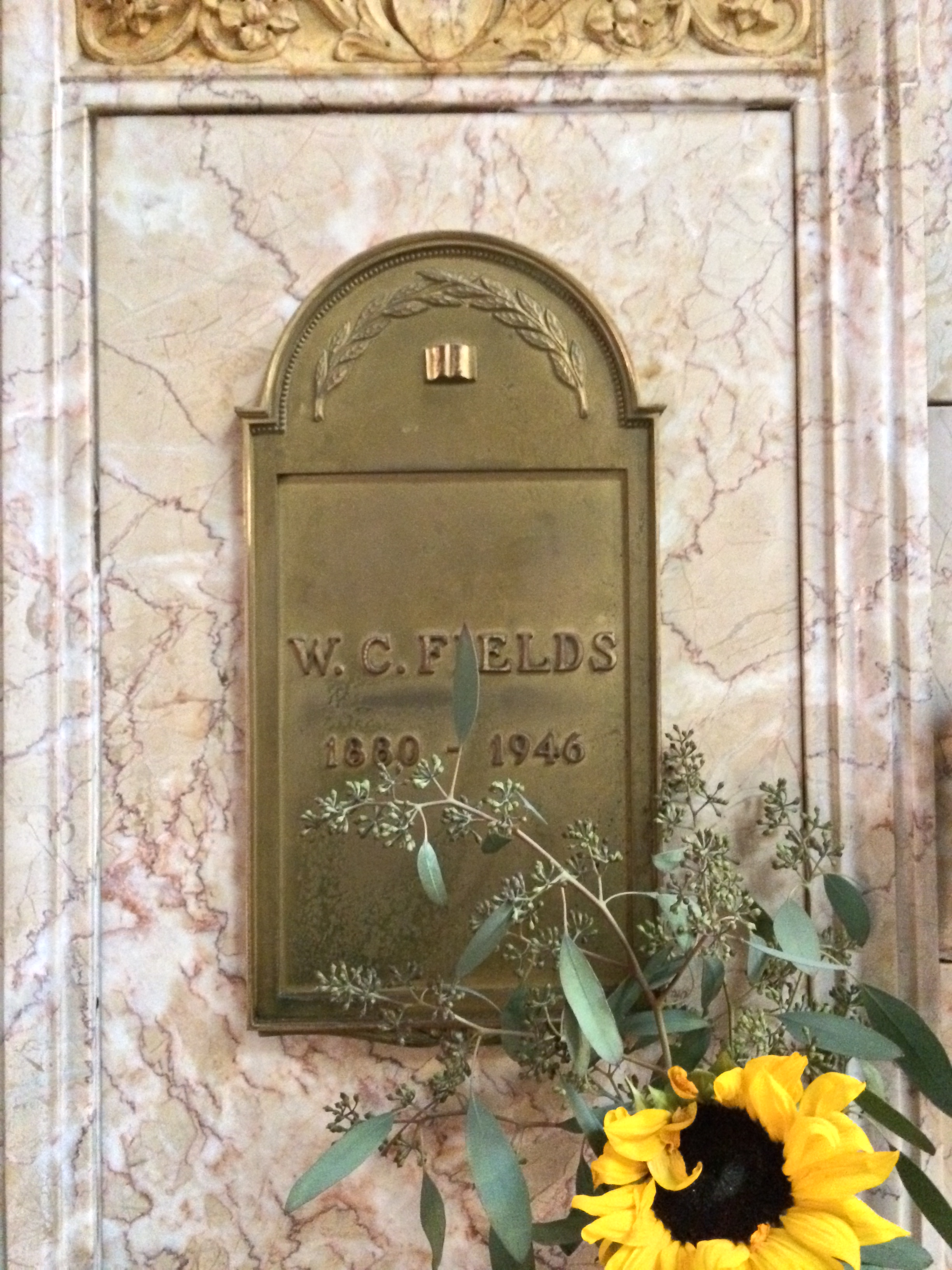
Fields's niche in the Columbarium of Nativity in the Holly Terrace section of the Great Mausoleum, Forest Lawn Glendale

It has been said that Fields's grave marker is inscribed, "I'd rather be in Philadelphia". The legend originated from a mock epitaph written by Fields for a 1925 Vanity Fair article: "Here Lies / W. C. Fields / I Would Rather Be Living in Philadelphia". In reality, his interment marker bears only his stage name and the years of his birth and death.

== Comic persona and style ==
Fields often played a "bumbling hero". In 1937, in an article in Motion Picture magazine, he analyzed the characters he played:

You've heard the old legend that it's the little put-upon guy who gets the laughs, but I'm the most belligerent guy on the screen. I'm going to kill everybody. But, at the same time, I'm afraid of everybody—just a great big frightened bully . ... I was the first comic in world history, so they told me, to pick fights with children. I booted Baby LeRoy ... then, in another picture, I kicked a little dog . ... But I got sympathy both times. People didn't know what the unmanageable baby might do to get even, and they thought the dog might bite me.

In features such as It's a Gift and Man on the Flying Trapeze, he is reported to have written or improvised more or less all of his own dialogue and material, leaving story structure to other writers. He frequently incorporated his stage sketches into his films—e.g., the "Back Porch" scene he wrote for the Follies of 1925 was filmed in It's the Old Army Game (1926) and It's a Gift (1934); the golf sketch he performed in the lost film His Lordship's Dilemma (1915) was re-used in the Follies of 1918, and in the films So's Your Old Man (1926), The Golf Specialist (1930), The Dentist (1932), and You're Telling Me (1934).

Fields's most familiar characteristics included a distinctive drawl, which was not his normal speaking voice. His manner of muttering deprecatory asides was copied from his mother, who in Fields's childhood often mumbled sly comments about neighbors who passed by. He delighted in provoking the censors with double entendres and the near-profanities "Godfrey Daniels" and "mother of pearl". A favorite bit of "business", repeated in many of his films, involved his hat going astray—either caught on the end of his cane, or simply facing the wrong way—as he attempts to put it onto his head.

In several of his films, he played hustlers, carnival barkers, and card sharps, spinning yarns and distracting his marks. In others, he cast himself as a victim: a bumbling everyman husband and father whose family does not appreciate him.

Fields often reproduced elements of his own family life in his films. By the time he entered motion pictures, his relationship with his estranged wife had become acrimonious, and he believed she had turned their son Claude—whom he seldom saw—against him. James Curtis says of Man on the Flying Trapeze that the "disapproving mother-in-law, Mrs. Neselrode, was clearly patterned after his wife, Hattie, and the unemployable mama's boy played by [Grady] Sutton was deliberately named Claude. Fields hadn't laid eyes on his family in nearly twenty years, and yet the painful memories lingered."

=== Unusual names ===
Although lacking formal education, Fields was well read and a lifelong admirer of author Charles Dickens, whose characters' unusual names inspired Fields to collect odd names he encountered in his travels, to be used for his characters. Some examples are:

- "The Great McGonigle" (The Old-Fashioned Way);
- "Ambrose Wolfinger" [pointing toward "Wolf-whistling"] (Man on the Flying Trapeze);
- "Larson E. [read "Larceny"] Whipsnade", the surname taken from a zoo Fields had seen outside London (You Can't Cheat an Honest Man),
- "Egbert Sousé" [pronounced "soo-SAY" but pointing toward "souse", a synonym for a drunk] (The Bank Dick, 1940).

Fields often contributed to the scripts of his films under unusual pseudonyms. They include the seemingly prosaic "Charles Bogle", credited in four of his films in the 1930s; "Otis Criblecoblis", which contains an embedded homophone for "scribble"; and "Mahatma Kane Jeeves", a play on Mahatma and a phrase an aristocrat might use when about to leave the house: "My hat, my cane, Jeeves".

=== Supporting players ===
Fields had a small cadre of supporting players that he employed in several films:

- Elise Cavanna, whose onscreen interplay with Fields was compared (by William K. Everson) to that between Groucho Marx and his friend Margaret Dumont
- Jan Duggan, an old-maid character (actually only a year younger than Fields). It was of her character that Fields said in The Old Fashioned Way, "She's all dressed up like a well-kept grave."
- Kathleen Howard, as a nagging wife or antagonist
- Baby LeRoy, as a preschool child fond of playing pranks on Fields's characters
- Franklin Pangborn, a fussy, ubiquitous character comedian who played in several Fields films, most memorably as J. Pinkerton Snoopington in The Bank Dick
- Alison Skipworth, as his wife (although 16 years his senior), usually in a supportive role rather than the stereotypical nag
- Grady Sutton, typically a country bumpkin type, as a foil or an antagonist to Fields's character
- Bill Wolfe, as a gaunt-looking character, usually a Fields foil
- Tammany Young, as a dim-witted, unintentionally harmful assistant, who appeared in seven Fields films until his sudden death from heart failure in 1936

== Unrealized film projects ==
W. C. Fields was (with Ed Wynn) one of the two original choices for the title role in the 1939 version of The Wizard of Oz. Fields was enthusiastic about the role, but ultimately withdrew his name from consideration so he could devote his time to writing You Can't Cheat an Honest Man. Aljean Harmetz, author of The Making of The Wizard of Oz, also said that the studio would not meet his price.

Fields figured in an Orson Welles project. Welles's bosses at RKO Radio Pictures, after losing money on Citizen Kane, urged Welles to choose as his next film a subject with more commercial appeal. Welles considered an adaptation of Charles Dickens' The Pickwick Papers which would have starred Fields, but the project was shelved, partly because of contract difficulties, and Welles went on to adapt The Magnificent Ambersons.

During the early planning for his film It's a Wonderful Life, director Frank Capra considered Fields for the role of Uncle Billy, which eventually went to Thomas Mitchell.

== Influence and legacy ==
A best-selling biography of Fields published three years after his death, W. C. Fields, His Follies and Fortunes by Robert Lewis Taylor, was instrumental in popularizing the idea that Fields's real-life character matched his screen persona. In 1973, the comedian's grandson, Ronald J. Fields, published the first book to challenge this idea significantly, W. C. Fields by Himself, His Intended Autobiography, a compilation of material from private scrapbooks and letters found in the home of Hattie Fields after her death in 1963.

According to Woody Allen (in a New York Times interview from January 30, 2000), Fields is one of six "genuine comic geniuses" he recognized as such in movie history, along with Charlie Chaplin, Buster Keaton, Groucho and Harpo Marx, and Peter Sellers.

The Surrealists loved Fields's absurdism and anarchistic pranks. Max Ernst painted a Project for a Monument to W. C. Fields (1957), and René Magritte made an Homage to Mack Sennett (1934).

The Firesign Theatre titled the second track of their 1968 album Waiting for the Electrician or Someone Like Him "W. C. Fields Forever", as a pun referring to the Beatles song "Strawberry Fields Forever".

An LP of voice tracks from his movies was released by Decca in 1969. It reached #13 in Canada.

The United States Postal Service issued a commemorative stamp on the comedian's 100th birthday, in January 1980.

=== Caricatures and imitations ===
- The character Horatio K. Boomer in the Fibber McGee and Molly radio show had a persona and delivery very much like the characters portrayed by Fields.
- The character of Nigel West Dickens in the video game Red Dead Redemption is said to be based on Fields, in particular the con-artist roles he portrayed in films.
- Cartoonist Al Hirschfeld portrayed Fields in caricature many times, including the book cover illustrations for Drat!, A Flask of Fields, and Godfrey Daniels! – all edited by Richard J. Anobile.
- The Amazing Mumford's voice on Sesame Street is equivalent to Fields's.
- Fields is among the many celebrities caricatured in the 1936 Merrie Melodies short The Coo-Coo Nut Grove.
- Fields is seen sitting on the spectators' bench in the Disney cartoon Mickey's Polo Team (1936).
- He appears as W. C. Fieldmouse in the Merrie Melodies short The Woods Are Full of Cuckoos (1937).
- In the 1938 Silly Symphonies cartoon Mother Goose Goes Hollywood Fields is caricatured as Humpty Dumpty, in reference to his role in the live-action film Alice in Wonderland (1933).
- One episode of The Flintstones featured a tramp who gets old clothes belonging to Fred from his wife Wilma, then when Fred attempts to take back a coat, is trounced with the tramp's cane. The tramp has Fields's voice and persona.
- A 1960s Canadian cartoon series for kids Tales of the Wizard of Oz featured a Wizard with a voice imitation of Fields, a nod to the real-life choice of Fields to play the Wizard in the 1939 film classic opposite Judy Garland.
- The Firesign Theatre used Philip Proctor's voice impersonation of Fields for two characters on their albums Waiting for the Electrician or Someone Like Him and How Can You Be in Two Places at Once When You're Not Anywhere at All.
- The Wizard of Id comic strip contains a shady lawyer character, a Fields caricature named "Larsen E. Pettifogger".
- Paul Frees adapted a Fields comic routine for the animated TV special The Mad, Mad, Mad Comedians in 1970.
- In 1971 Frito-Lay replaced the Frito Bandito TV ad campaign with one featuring W. C. Fritos, a round, top-hat wearing character modeled on the movie persona of Fields. Also, circa 1970 Sunkist Growers produced a series of animated TV ads featuring the "Sunkist Monster", whose voice was an impression of Fields performed by Paul Frees.
- A caricature of Fields appears in the Lucky Luke comic book album Western Circus and again in the animated feature Lucky Luke: The Ballad of the Daltons.
- The TV show Gigglesnort Hotel featured a puppet character named "W. C. Cornfield" who resembled Fields in appearance and voice.
- Impressionist Rich Little often imitated Fields on his TV series The Kopycats, and he used a Fields characterization for the Ebenezer Scrooge character in his HBO special Rich Little's Christmas Carol (1978), a one-man presentation of A Christmas Carol.
- In the second series of the TV drama Gangsters a character named the White Devil is introduced, who styles himself W.D. Fields, affecting the vocal mannerisms and appearance of Fields to confuse and confound his enemies. Played by series writer Philip Martin, he himself is credited in the final episode as "Larson E. Whipsnade" after Fields's character in You Can't Cheat an Honest Man.
- Comedian Mark Proksch impersonates Fields in a number of On Cinema episodes, beginning with the series' Second Annual Oscar Special and continuing through a majority of the seasons.
- Comedians Hudson & Landry imitated Fields on their 1972 album "Losing Their Heads" with the Fields-sounding character running a shady business named "Ajax Travel Bureau". This was a take-off on their earlier hit "Ajax Liquor Store".

=== In popular culture ===
- Fields is one of the figures that appears in the crowd scene on the cover of The Beatles' 1967 album Sgt. Pepper's Lonely Hearts Club Band.
- There is a poster of Fields on the wall of Sam's bedroom on the TV show Freaks and Geeks.
- Derek Newark portrayed Fields in the 1983 Channel 4 television special Hollywood Hits Chiswick, in which Fields visits the site of his performance at the Chiswick Empire.
- Actor Bob Leeman portrayed Fields in the 1991 movie The Rocketeer.
- Fields appears in "The Keystone Constables" (December 8, 2014), episode 9 of season 8, a vaudeville-themed episode of the Canadian television period drama Murdoch Mysteries. Fields is played by Canadian actor Andrew Chapman.

== Filmography ==
Information for this filmography is derived from the book, W. C. Fields: A Life on Film, by Ronald J. Fields. All films are feature length except where noted.

Release date	Title	Role	Director	Notes
1915	(untitled film)	Himself	Ed Wynn	Lost film; this short comedy sketch was presented as part of the Ziegfeld Follies of 1915; Ed Wynn appeared live on stage as a movie director, interacting with the characters shown on the screen
September 19, 1915	Pool Sharks	The pool shark	Edwin Middleton	One reel; story by W. C. Fields; extant
October 3, 1915	His Lordship's Dilemma	Remittance man	William Haddock	One reel; lost film
October 27, 1924	Janice Meredith	A British sergeant	E. Mason Hopper	extant
August 2, 1925	Sally of the Sawdust	Professor Eustace P. McGargle	D. W. Griffith	extant
October 7, 1925	That Royle Girl	Daisy Royle's father	D. W. Griffith	lost film
May 24, 1926	It's the Old Army Game	Elmer Prettywillie	A. Edward Sutherland	Story by J.P. McEvoy and W. C. Fields; extant
October 26, 1926	So's Your Old Man	Samuel Bisbee	Gregory La Cava	extant
January 31, 1927	The Potters	Pa Potter	Fred C. Newmeyer	lost film
August 20, 1927	Running Wild	Elmer Finch	Gregory La Cava	extant
October 17, 1927	Two Flaming Youths	J. G. "Gabby" Gilfoil	John S. Waters	lost film
March 3, 1928	Tillie's Punctured Romance	The Ringmaster	A. Edward Sutherland	lost film
May 7, 1928	Fools for Luck	Richard Whitehead	Charles F. Reisner	lost film
August 22, 1930	The Golf Specialist	J. Effington Bellwether	Monte Brice	Two reels; story by W. C. Fields (uncredited)
October 26, 1931	Her Majesty, Love	Bela Toerrek	William Dieterle	
July 8, 1932	Million Dollar Legs	President of Klopstokia	Edward Cline	
October 2, 1932	If I Had a Million	Rollo La Rue	Norman Taurog	
October 9, 1932	The Dentist	Himself	Leslie Pearce	Two reels; story by W. C. Fields (uncredited)
March 3, 1933	The Fatal Glass of Beer	Mr. Snavely	Clyde Bruckman	Two reels; story by W. C. Fields (uncredited)
April 21, 1933	The Pharmacist	Mr. Dilweg	Arthur Ripley	Two reels; story by W. C. Fields (uncredited)
June 2, 1933	International House	Professor Quail	A. Edward Sutherland	
June 24, 1933	Hip Action	Himself	George Marshall	One reel; Fields and other screen actors observe a golf demonstration by Bobby Jones
July 28, 1933	The Barber Shop	Cornelius O'Hare	Arthur Ripley	Two reels; story by W. C. Fields (uncredited)
September 8, 1933	Hollywood on Parade No. B-2	Himself	Louis Lewyn	One reel; guest appearance, with Chico Marx
October 13, 1933	Tillie and Gus	Augustus Q. Winterbottom	Francis Martin	Fields as contributing writer (uncredited)
October 22, 1933	Alice in Wonderland	Humpty Dumpty	Norman McLeod	
February 9, 1934	Six of a Kind	Sheriff "Honest John" Hoxley	Leo McCarey	
April 6, 1934	You're Telling Me!	Sam Bisbee	Erle C. Kenton	Fields as contributing writer (uncredited)
April 27, 1934	Hollywood on Parade No. B-10	Himself	Louis Lewyn	One reel
July 13, 1934	The Old Fashioned Way	The Great (Marc Antony) McGonigle	William Beaudine	Story by "Charles Bogle" (W. C. Fields)
October 19, 1934	Mrs. Wiggs of the Cabbage Patch	Mr. C. Ellsworth Stubbins	Norman Taurog	
November 30, 1934	It's a Gift	Harold Bissonette	Norman McLeod	Original story by "Charles Bogle" (W. C. Fields)
January 18, 1935	David Copperfield	Wilkins Micawber	George Cukor	
March 22, 1935	Mississippi	Commodore Orlando Jackson	A. Edward Sutherland	
July 26, 1935	Man on the Flying Trapeze	Ambrose Wolfinger	Clyde Bruckman	Story by "Charles Bogle" (W. C. Fields)
June 19, 1936	Poppy	Professor Eustace P. McGargle	A. Edward Sutherland	
February 18, 1938	The Big Broadcast of 1938	T. Frothingill Bellows; S. B. Bellows	Mitchell Leisen	
February 17, 1939	You Can't Cheat an Honest Man	Larson E. Whipsnade	George Marshall	Story by "Charles Bogle" (W. C. Fields)
February 9, 1940	My Little Chickadee	Cuthbert J. Twillie	Edward Cline	Bar scene written by W. C. Fields
November 29, 1940	The Bank Dick	Egbert Sousé	Edward Cline	Story by "Mahatma Kane Jeeves" (W. C. Fields)
October 10, 1941	Never Give a Sucker an Even Break	Bill Fields, the Great Man	Edward Cline	Original story by "Otis Criblecoblis" (W. C. Fields). Final starring film.
unreleased	The Laziest Golfer	Himself	(unknown)	Footage shot but never assembled
October 30, 1942	Tales of Manhattan	Professor Postlewhistle	Julien Duvivier	Sequence with Fields cut from original release, restored for home video.
May 5, 1944	Follow the Boys	Himself (Guest sequence)	A. Edward Sutherland	Fields revived his old trick pool table routine
June 21, 1944	Song of the Open Road	Himself (Guest sequence)	S. Sylvan Simon	Fields juggled for a few moments
June 30, 1944	Sensations of 1945	Himself (Guest sequence)	Andrew L. Stone	Fields revived part of his old "Caledonian Express" sketch (last appearance)
