= Miss Fane's Baby Is Stolen =

1934 film by Alexander Hall

Miss Fane's Baby is Stolen
- Directed by: Alexander Hall
- Written by: Adela Rogers St. Johns; Jane Storm
- Based on: the play by Rupert Hughes
- Produced by: Bayard Veiller
- Starring: Dorothea Wieck; Alice Brady; Baby LeRoy; William Frawley; George Barbier; Alan Hale; Jack La Rue; Dorothy Burgess; Florence Roberts; Irving Bacon; George 'Spanky' McFarland
- Cinematography: Alfred Gilks
- Edited by: James Smith
- Production company: Paramount Pictures
- Distributed by: Paramount Pictures
- Release date: January 12, 1934
- Running time: 70 minutes
- Country: United States
- Language: English

Miss Fane's Baby Is Stolen is a 1934 pre-Code American comedy-drama film, starring Dorothea Wieck, Alice Brady, and Baby LeRoy, written by Adela Rogers St. Johns and Jane Storm from a novel and story by Rupert Hughes, and directed by Alexander Hall. The events depicted in the film were allegedly based on the Lindbergh kidnapping.

== Plot ==
Madeline Fane is a busy and successful actress who is fiercely devoted to her two-year-old son. One day, little Michael disappears from his crib. Miss Fane avoids speaking to the police at first, then calls upon both law enforcement and her legions of fans for help. One of them, impoverished Molly Prentiss who is also a single mother and who receives a signed photo of her idol at the beginning of the film after watching Fane finish a take with her leading man, comes to the rescue.

== Cast ==
- Dorothea Wieck as Miss Madeline Fane
- Alice Brady as Molly Prentiss
- Baby LeRoy as Michael Fane
- William Frawley as Captain Murphy
- George Barbier as MacCready
- Alan Hale, Sr. as Sam
- Jack LaRue as Bert
- Dorothy Burgess as Dotty
- Florence Roberts as Agnes
- Irving Bacon as Joel Prentiss
- Ruth Clifford as Friend of Miss Fane (uncredited)
- George 'Spanky' McFarland as Johnny Prentiss

== Production ==
This is one of only a handful of English-language roles for Swiss-German actress Dorothea Wieck, who was assigned to the project after Carole Lombard declined the role. In the opening 'film-within-a-film' sequence, many of the film's crew members can be seen playing crew members of Miss Fane's film, including director Alexander Hall and cinematographer Alfred Gilks. Screenwriter Adela Rogers St. Johns had covered the Lindbergh case, which was still a fresh news item when Miss Fane's Baby Is Missing went into production, and was not yet resolved when the film was released. Unlike the real case, Michael Fane is recovered safely and unharmed, in compliance with the Hays Office.

== Reception ==
Miss Fane's Baby Is Stolen opened to positive reviews. Mordaunt Hall of the New York Times enthusiastically called the film "extraordinarily effective," and singled out for praise its leading lady: "Miss Wieck's interpretation of mental agony is subdued but very true. Her expression of joy at the return of Michael is apt to bring tears to the eyes of the most hardened cinema-goer..." Time magazine called it "a topical film which draws tears with out half trying" in a dual review with I Am Suzanne! (1933), and noted the "expert work" of cast members Brady and Jack La Rue. Martin Dickstein allowed that the film "provides Miss Wieck with better screen material than did Cradle Song" but that it "drags perceptively in the early reels" and was "a far less interesting drama than it might have been."
