= Sally of the Sawdust =

1925 film directed by D. W. Griffith

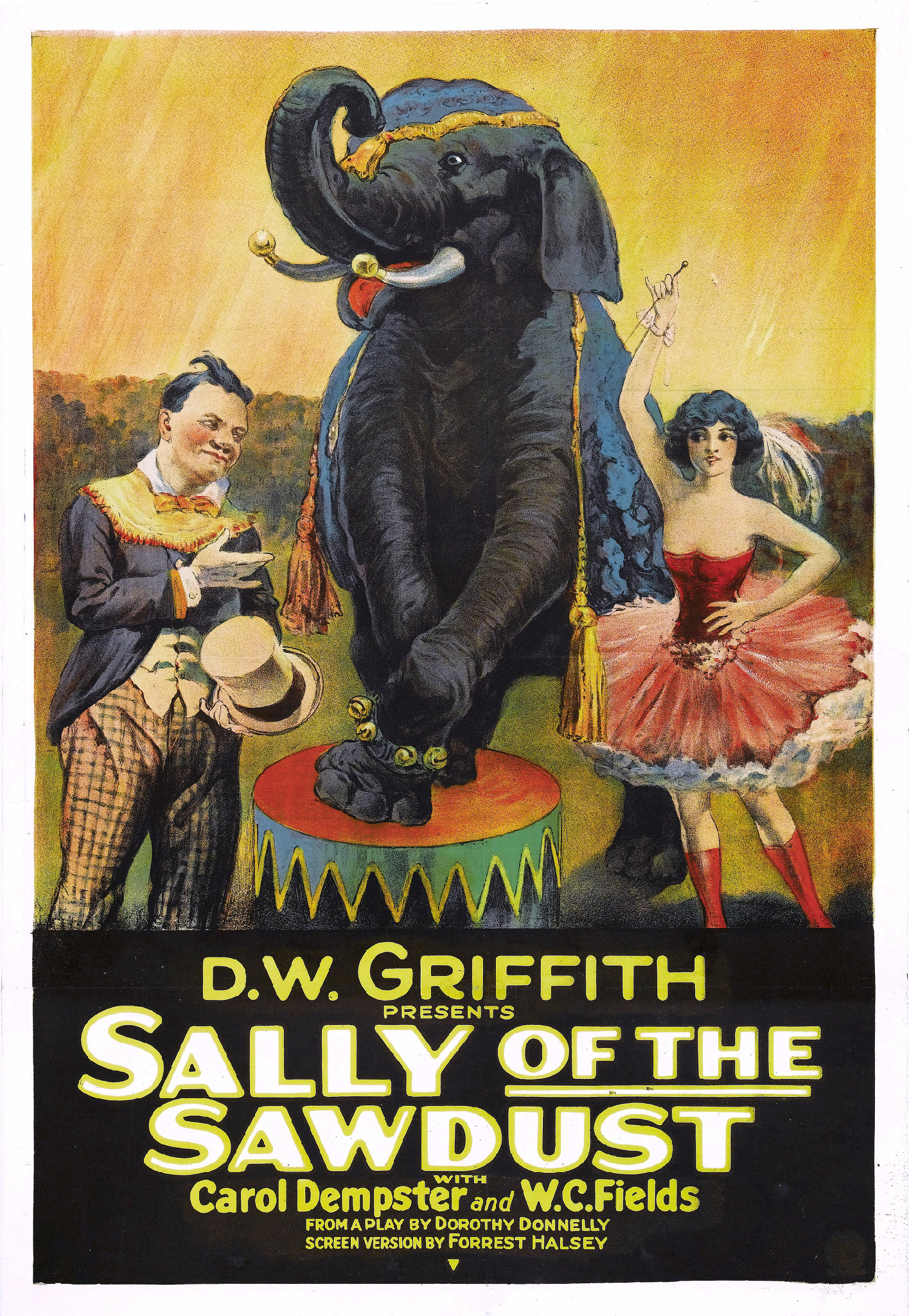
- Theatrical release poster
- Directed by: D. W. Griffith
- Written by: Forrest Halsey
- Based on: Poppy by Dorothy Donnelly
- Produced by: D. W. Griffith
- Starring: Carol Dempster; W. C. Fields; Alfred Lunt; Erville Alderson; Marie Shotwell; Glenn Anders
- Cinematography: Harry Fischbeck; Hal Sintzenich
- Edited by: Russell G. Shields; James Smith
- Production company: D.W. Griffith Productions
- Distributed by: United Artists
- Release date: August 2, 1925
- Running time: 104 minutes
- Country: United States
- Language: Silent (English intertitles)
- Budget: $337,000
- Box office: $1,750,000

Sally of the Sawdust (1925)

Sally of the Sawdust is a 1925 American silent comedy film directed by D. W. Griffith and starring Carol Dempster and W. C. Fields. It was based on the 1923 stage musical Poppy. Fields would later star in a second film version, Poppy (1936).

== Plot ==
Because she married a circus performer, Judge Foster casts out his only daughter. Just before her death a few years later, she leaves her little girl Sally in the care of her friend McGargle, a good-natured crook, juggler and fakir. Sally grows up in this atmosphere and is unaware of her parentage. McGargle, realizing his responsibility to the child, gets a job with a carnival company playing at Great Meadows, where the Fosters live. A real estate boom has made them wealthy. Sally is a hit with her dancing. Peyton, the son of Judge Foster's friend, falls in love with Sally. To save him, the Judge arranges to have McGargle and Sally arrested. McGargle escapes, but Sally is hunted down and brought back. McGargle, hearing of Sally's plight, steals a Flivver, and after many delays, reaches the courtroom and presents proof of Sally's parentage. The Judge dismisses the case and his wife takes Sally in her arms, but Peyton's claim is stronger and she agrees to become his wife. McGargle is persuaded to remain and is found an outlet for his peculiar talents in selling real estate.

== Cast ==
- Carol Dempster as Sally
- W. C. Fields as Professor Eustace McGargle
- Alfred Lunt as Peyton Lennox
- Erville Alderson as Judge Henry L. Foster
- Effie Shannon as Mrs. Foster
- Charles Hammond as Lennox, Sr.
- Roy Applegate as the detective
- Florence Fair as Miss Vinton
- Marie Shotwell as society leader
- Glenn Anders as Leon, the acrobat
- Steve Murphy as bandit
- Harrison Ford (uncredited)
- James Kirkwood, Sr. (uncredited)
- Tammany Young as yokel in the old army game (uncredited)

== Production ==
Sally of the Sawdust was filmed at Paramount Pictures' Long Island studios.
