= It's a Gift =

1934 film by Norman Z. McLeod

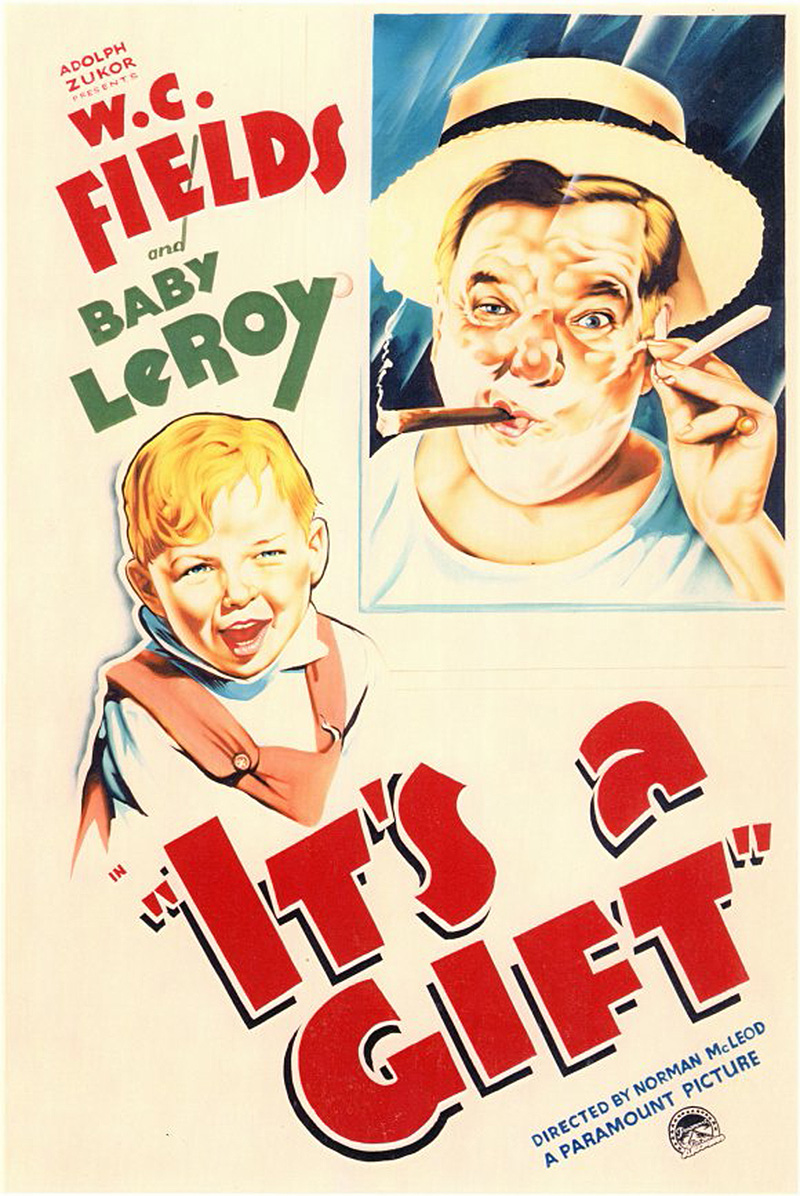
- Theatrical poster to It's a Gift (1934)
- Directed by: Norman Z. McLeod
- Written by: Jack Cunningham
- Based on: The Comic Supplement; 1925 play by J.P. McEvoy, story by Charles Bogle (Fields)
- Produced by: William LeBaron
- Starring: W.C. Fields; Baby LeRoy
- Cinematography: Henry Sharp
- Music by: John Leipold
- Distributed by: Paramount Pictures
- Release date: November 17, 1934
- Running time: 68 minutes
- Country: United States
- Language: English

It's a Gift is a 1934 American comedy film starring W.C. Fields. It was Fields's 16th sound film and his fifth in 1934 alone.

The film concerns the trials and tribulations of a grocer as he battles a shrewish wife, an incompetent assistant, and assorted annoying children, customers, and salesmen. The film reprises routines honed by Fields from his career over the years 1915–1925. Fields often tried to recapture sketches that led to his stage success onto film; skits such as "The Picnic", "A Joy Ride", and most famously, "The Back Porch" are all featured in It's a Gift.

It is one of several Paramount Pictures in which Fields contended with child actor Baby LeRoy. The film was directed by Norman McLeod, who had directed Fields in his cameo as Humpty Dumpty in Alice in Wonderland (1933).

== Plot ==
After inheriting some money, Harold Bissonette (mispronounced by his pompous wife as "biss-on-ay") decides to give up the grocery business, move to California, and run an orange ranch. Despite his family's objections and the news that the land he bought is worthless, Bissonette packs up and drives out to California with his nagging wife Amelia, self-involved daughter Mildred, and bothersome son Norman. As they pass several prosperous orange groves, his wife softens and figures he made a good purchase. Unfortunately, his family's doubts prove correct: his barren plot contains only a tumbledown shack and a tumbleweed. Disgusted, his wife and family walk out on him. As he sits down on the car's running board, the car collapses under his weight.

Just when Harold is about to lose all hope, though, his luck takes a dramatic turn; a neighbor informs him that a developer is desperate to acquire his land to build a grandstand for a race track. Finally standing up for himself and to his nagging wife, Harold holds out for a large sum of money (including a commission for the friendly neighbor), as well as a demand that the developer buy him an orange grove like the one in the brochure he has been carrying throughout the film. The film ends with Harold sitting at an outdoor breakfast table squeezing orange juice into a glass, while his happy family takes off for a ride in their new car. The now-contented Harold pours a flask of booze into the small amount of orange juice in the glass.

The film is a chronicle of the "many titanic struggles between Harold Bissonnette and the universe. There will be battle of wills between father and daughter, between male and female, between man and a variety of uncontrollable objects."

The plot is secondary to the series of routines that make up the film. Over the course of the picture, Harold fails to prevent a blind customer named Mr. Muckle (and Baby LeRoy) from turning his store into a disaster area; attempts to share a bathroom mirror with his self-centered, high-pitched, gargling daughter; has a destructive picnic on private property; and in the film's lengthy centerpiece, is driven to sleep on the porch by his haranguing wife, and is kept awake all night by neighbors (including further trouble with the mother of the baby who caused damage in his grocery store), salesmen, and assorted noises and calamities.

A well-known, and often somewhat misquoted Fields comment occurs at the climax of the film, as Harold is haggling with the developer, who angrily claims that Harold is drunk. Harold responds, "Yeah, and you're crazy; and I'll be sober tomorrow and ... you'll be crazy for the rest of your life!"

== Cast ==
- W.C. Fields as Harold Bissonette
- Kathleen Howard as Amelia Bissonette
- Jean Rouverol as Mildred Bissonette
- Julian Madison as John Durston
- Tommy Bupp as Norman Bissonette
- Tammany Young as Everett Ricks, store employee
- Baby LeRoy as Baby Elwood Dunk
- Morgan Wallace as Jasper Fitchmueller, Kumquats customer
- Charles Sellon as Mr. Muckle, blind customer
- Josephine Whittell as Mrs. Dunk
- Diana Lewis as Betty Dunk
- Dell Henderson as Charles Abernathy, Californian neighbour
- T. Roy Barnes as Insurance Salesman
- Spencer Charters as Park Guard
- Guy Usher as Harry Payne Bosterly

Additional cast: Jerry Mandy, James Burke, Edith Kingdon, The Avalon Boys and Billy Engle.

=== Additional production credits ===
- Art direction by Hans Dreier and John B. Goodman

== Reception ==
A contemporary review from 'Argus' in The Literary Digest, 1935, declared: "It is clumsy, crude, and quite amateurish in its appearance. It merely happens that a great comedian appears in it and has a free hand in his brilliant clowning, with the result that defects become unimportant, and the film emerges as a comedy delight." James Agee lauded the film: "The talkies brought one great comedian, the late, majestically lethargic W. C. Fields, who could not possibly have worked as well in silence; he was the toughest and most warmly human of all screen comedians, and It's a Gift and The Bank Dick, fiendishly funny and incisive white-collar comedies, rank high among the best comedies (and best movies) ever made." Leonard Maltin gave it four of four stars: "Beautiful comedy routines in one of the Great Man's unforgettable films." Leslie Halliwell gave it two of four stars: "Roughly assembled comedy of disasters which happens to show the star more of less at his best ... "

As of January, 2023 the film has a reviewer rating of 94% on Rotten Tomatoes.

In 2010, this film was selected for preservation in the United States National Film Registry by the Library of Congress as being "culturally, historically, or aesthetically significant".

The film is recognized by American Film Institute in:

- 2000: AFI's 100 Years...100 Laughs – #58

== See also ==
- 1934 in film
