= Poppy (1936 film) =

1936 film by A. Edward Sutherland

- Directed by: A. Edward Sutherland
- Written by: Waldemar Young; Virginia Van Upp
- Based on: Poppy by Dorothy Donnelly
- Produced by: Paul Jones; William LeBaron
- Starring: W. C. Fields; Rochelle Hudson; Richard Cromwell; Catherine Doucet
- Cinematography: William C. Mellor
- Edited by: Stuart Heisler
- Music by: Friedrich Hollaender
- Distributed by: Paramount Pictures
- Release date: June 17, 1936
- Running time: 73 minutes
- Country: United States
- Language: English

Poppy is a 1936 comedy film starring W. C. Fields and Rochelle Hudson. The film was based on a 1923 stage revue of the same name starring Fields and Madge Kennedy. This was the second film version of the revue featuring Fields, following Sally of the Sawdust in 1925 with Carol Dempster in the title role.

== Plot ==
Eustace McGargle, a con artist, snake oil salesman and shell game trickster, tries to escape the sheriff while taking care of his beloved adopted daughter Poppy, who, after pretending to be an heiress to win an inheritance, is found to be an actual heiress.

== Cast ==
- W. C. Fields as Professor Eustace McGargle
- Rochelle Hudson as Poppy
- Richard Cromwell as Billy Farnsworth
- Catherine Doucet as Countess Maggi Tubbs DePuizzi
- Lynne Overman as Attorney Whiffen
- Granville Bates as Mayor Farnsworth
- Maude Eburne as Sarah Tucker
- Bill Wolfe as Egmont
- Adrian Morris as Constable Bowman
- Rosalind Keith as Frances Parker
- Ralph Remley as Carnival Manager

== Production ==
Fields was suffering the effects of his heavy drinking and he injured his back during the making of the film. As a result, his performance may have suffered. Fields was ill during the production, and a fairly obvious double was used in several scenes requiring physical exertion.

== Reception ==
In a contemporary review for The New York Times, critic Frank Nugent called Poppy a "glorious victory" for Fields and for comedy while conceding that the scenes without Fields were "painfully frail" and would provoke some squirming and eye-rolling.

Writing for The Spectator in 1936, Graham Greene offered a positive review, commenting that "Mr. Fields has never acted better." Comparing Fields' characterization to those of Charlie Chaplin, Greene noted that Fields "wins our hearts not by a display of Chaplin sentiment, not by class solidarity (he robs the poor as promptly as the rich), but simply by the completeness of his dishonesty."

== Awards ==
"Never give a sucker an even break" was nominated for the American Film Institute's 2005 list AFI's 100 Years...100 Movie Quotes.
