= Poppy (1923 musical) =

Musical

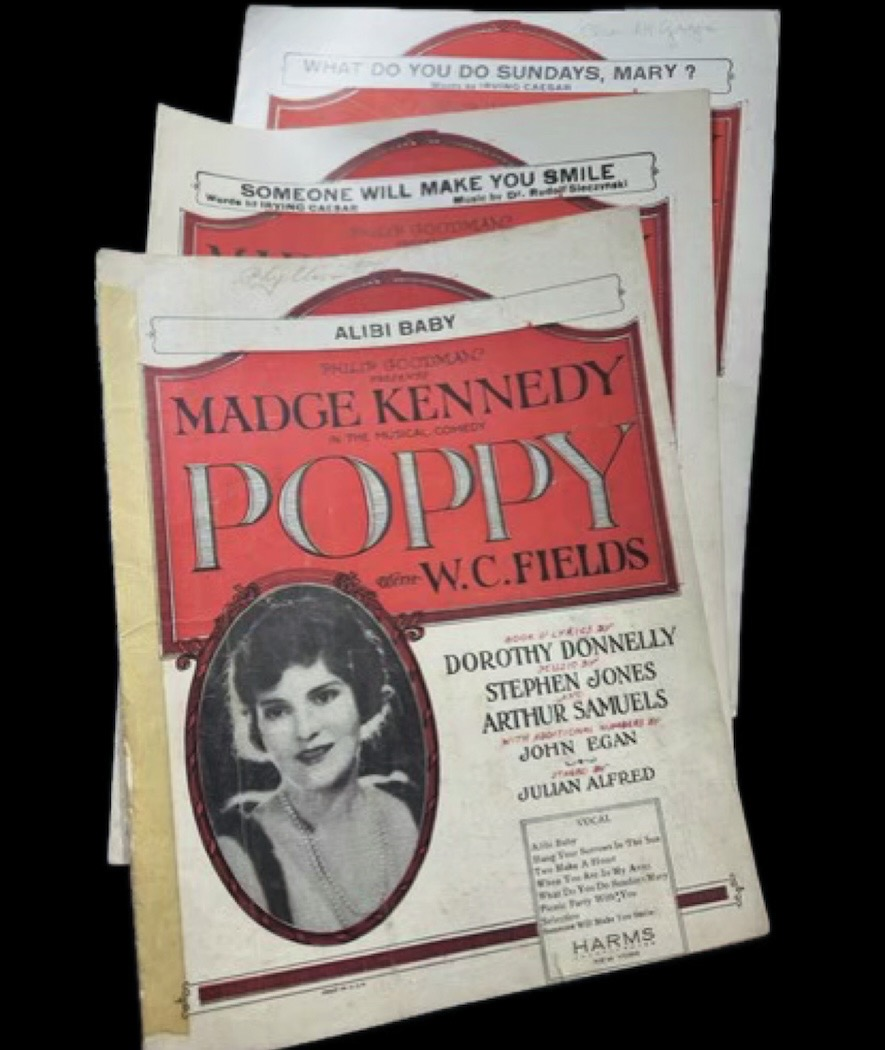
- Sheet music covers from Poppy
- Music: Stephen Jones and Arthur Samuels
- Lyrics: Dorothy Donnelly and others.
- Book: Dorothy Donnelly, (Howard Dietz, W. C. Fields)
- Productions: 1923 Broadway

Poppy is a musical comedy in three acts with music by Stephen Jones and Arthur Samuels (additional music by John Egan), and lyrics and book by Dorothy Donnelly, with contributions from Howard Dietz, W. C. Fields and Irving Caesar. The musical introduced songs such as "Two Make a Home", "On Our Honeymoon", "What Do You Do Sunday, Mary?" and "Alibi Baby". The story, set in 1874 Connecticut, concerns a circus barker and con man, Prof. Eustace McGargle, who tries to pass off his foster daughter, Poppy, as a long-lost heiress. It turns out that Poppy really is an heiress.

The original New York City staging, produced by Philip Goodman opened at the Apollo Theater on September 3, 1923, and ran for a successful 346 performances, closing on June 28, 1924. It starred Madge Kennedy as Poppy, with Fields as Prof. McGargle, and Robert Woolsey and Jimmy Barry. It was directed by Dorothy Donnelly and Julian Alfred, with choreography by Alfred. The musical then toured. The piece then had a London production at the Gaiety Theatre in 1924. The musical included elements of revue, including specialty numbers. Its success established Fields' comic con man persona and led to film versions, also starring Fields.

== Synopsis ==
In Greenmeadow, Connecticut, in 1874, Prof. Eustace McGargle, a juggler and hustler who runs a traveling circus, adopts an orphan, Poppy. He teaches her to be a con artist. When the circus passes through a small town, Poppy meets a wealthy local boy, William. McGargle learns that Princess Vronski Mameluke Pasha Tubbs has a long-lost daughter, and he tries to pass Poppy off as the heiress. In the end she turns out to be actually the heiress and marries William.

== Musical numbers ==
Act1

- Stepping Around – Mary, Amos and Ensemble
- The Girl I've Never Met – William and Dancers
- Hang Your Sorrows in the Sun (music by Egan) – Poppy
- Two Make a Home – Poppy and William
- Kadoola Kadoola Solo – Prof. McGargle
- When Men Are Alone – Mortimer, Dancers and Ensemble
- Fortune Telling – Poppy and Boys

Act 2

- The Dancing Lesson (music by Egan) – Dancers and Ensemble
- Alibi Baby (lyrics by Dietz) – Mary and Ensemble
- On Our Honeymoon – Poppy and William
- Choose a Partner, Please – Poppy and Ensemble
- Mary (lyrics by Caesar) – Mary, Mortimer, Dancers and Ensemble

Act 3

- A Picnic Party with You (music by Egan) – Mary, Mortimer, Dancers and Ensemble

== Roles and original Broadway cast ==
W. C. Fields and producer Philip Goodman c. 1923

- Amos Sniffen – Jimmy Barry
- Judge Delafield – Hugh Chilvers
- William Van Wyck – Alan Edwards
- Prof. Eustace McGargle – W. C. Fields
- Mary Delafield – Luella Gear
- Princess Vronski Mameluke Pasha Tubbs – Emma Janvier
- Poppy McGargle – Madge Kennedy
- Sarah Tucker – Maude Ream Stover
- Mortimer Pottle – Robert Woolsey

== Critical reception ==
The New York Times praised Poppy as a "tasteful and decorous musical comedy" and highlighted the performances of both Fields and Kennedy.

== Film versions ==
The musical formed the basis for two film versions, both of which starred Fields reviving his blustery carnival-barker character, Eustice P. McGargle. The first was Sally of the Sawdust (1925), a silent movie directed by D. W. Griffith and co-starring Carol Dempster as Sally; and the second was Poppy (1936), directed by A. Edward Sutherland. Fields wore his goofy clip-on mustache for the 1925 production, as he did for most of his silent pictures. Fields was ill during the 1936 production, and a fairly obvious double was used in several scenes requiring physical exertion. He still managed a memorable performance, including these well-known lines spoken to his daughter Poppy (Rochelle Hudson):

What a gorgeous day ... what effulgent sunshine ... effulgent sunshine, yes ... 'twas a day of this sort, the McGillicuddy brothers murdered their mother with an axe!
And if we should ever separate, my little plum, I want to give you just one bit of fatherly advice: "Never give a sucker an even break!"
