= Turn Off the Moon =

1937 film by Lewis Seiler

- Theatrical release poster
- Directed by: Lewis Seiler
- Screenplay by: Mildred Harrington; Marguerite Roberts; Paul Gerard Smith; Harlan Ware
- Produced by: Fanchon of Fanchon and Marco
- Starring: Charlie Ruggles; Eleanore Whitney; Johnny Downs; Kenny Baker; Phil Harris; Ben Blue
- Cinematography: Ted Tetzlaff
- Edited by: Edward Dmytryk
- Music by: John Leipold
- Production company: Paramount Pictures
- Distributed by: Paramount Pictures
- Release date: May 14, 1937
- Running time: 79 minutes
- Country: United States
- Language: English

Turn Off the Moon is a 1937 American comedy film directed by Lewis Seiler, written by Mildred Harrington, Marguerite Roberts, Paul Gerard Smith and Harlan Ware, and starring Charlie Ruggles, Eleanore Whitney, Johnny Downs, Kenny Baker, Phil Harris and Ben Blue. It was released on May 14, 1937, by Paramount Pictures. It was directed by George Archenbaud and Produced by Fanchon.

== Plot ==
Star-gazing department store owner J. Elliott Dinwiddy believes everything an astrologist, Dr. Wakefield, tells him. So when he supposedly can win the heart of secretary Myrtle Tweep just by arranging a love match between a boy and girl by a certain hour that night, while the stars are in alignment, Dinwiddy is determined to do just that.

He singles out Caroline Wilson, a dancer who happened to be in the store. Dinwiddy plays Cupid to pair her with Terry Keith, a popular songwriter who has been giving musical help to Dinwiddy's no-talent son. A few mixups later, Caroline gets arrested, Dinwiddy does too, and when Myrtle gets a call, she is no help at all. Wakefield extends the deadline, giving time for Dinwiddy to get the couples in question back together.

== Cast ==
- Charlie Ruggles as J. Elliott Dinwiddy
- Eleanore Whitney as Caroline Wilson
- Johnny Downs as Terry Keith
- Kenny Baker as himself
- Phil Harris as himself
- Ben Blue as Luke
- Marjorie Gateson as Myrtle Tweep
- Grady Sutton as Truelove Spencer
- Romo Vincent as Detective Dugan
- Andrew Tombes as Dr. Wakefield
- Constance Bergen as Maizie Jones
- Franklin Pangborn as Mr. Perkins
- The Albee Sisters as themselves
- The Fanchonettes as themselves
- Floyd Christy as Specialty Act
- Hal Gould as Specialty Act
- Pat West as Photographer
- Charles Williams as Brooks
- Jean Lorraine as Cigarette Girl
- Eddie Foy, Jr. as Dancer
- Don Ackerman as Dancer
