= Prologue (disambiguation) =

A prologue is a prefatory piece of writing.

Prologue may also refer to:

- A prologue time trial, a short opening stage often used in road cycling races
- Movie prologue, a stage show performed in movie theaters, mainly in the silent film era

== Books ==
- Prologue (magazine), published by National Archives and Records Administration, USA
- Prologue (Prose Edda), Icelandic literature
- Prologue, a Canadian book distributor owned by Renaud-Bray
- The Prologue of the Gospel of John, sometimes known as the Hymn to the Word

== Film and TV ==
- Prologue (2015 film), an Academy Award nominated animated short by Richard Williams
- Prologue (1969 film), a 1969 Canadian film directed by Robin Spry
- The Prologue, a 2019 Indian drama film

== Music ==
=== Albums ===
- Prologue, album by Akina Nakamori
- Prologue (Renaissance album), 1972 album
- "Prologue", song by Electric Light Orchestra on their album Time
- Prologue (Elton John album), 2001 album
- Prologue: The Art of War/Cherry Blossom Epitaph, 2005 EP by Behind Crimson Eyes
- Prologue, album by Gin Lee
- Prologue, album by The Milk Carton Kids

=== Songs ===
- "Prologue", a song by Gentle Giant from Three Friends (1972)
- "Prologue", a song by Susumu Hirasawa from Sim City (1995)
- "Prologue", a song by Jinjer from King of Everything (2016)
- "Prologue", a song by Kate Bush from Aerial (2005)
- "Prologue", a song by Lower Than Atlantis from Changing Tune (2012)
- "Prologue", a song by Opeth from My Arms, Your Hearse (1998)
- "Prologue", a song by Yoasobi from The Book (2021)

== Others ==
- Honda Prologue, an electric vehicle
- Prologue (video game), an upcoming video game by PUBG Corporation
- Prologue (ice show), produced by Japanese figure skater Yuzuru Hanyu
- Prologue, a private-label brand by Target

== See also ==
- General Prologue, the assumed title of the series of portraits that precedes Chaucer's The Canterbury Tales
- Prolog, programming language
