= Three Cheers for Love =

1936 film by Ray McCarey

- Directed by: Ray McCarey
- Written by: George Marion, Jr.
- Produced by: A.M. Botsford
- Starring: Eleanore Whitney; Robert Cummings; William Frawley; Elizabeth Patterson; Roscoe Karns; John Halliday
- Cinematography: Harry Fischbeck
- Edited by: Edward Dmytryk
- Music by: Phil Boutelje; Charles Bradshaw; John Leipold
- Production company: Paramount Pictures
- Distributed by: Paramount Pictures
- Release date: June 26, 1936
- Running time: 61 minutes
- Country: United States
- Language: English

Three Cheers for Love is a 1936 American musical film directed by Ray McCarey, written by George Marion, Jr., and starring Eleanore Whitney, Robert Cummings, William Frawley, Elizabeth Patterson, Roscoe Karns and John Halliday. It was released on June 26, by Paramount Pictures.

== Plot ==
The showman Charles Dormant and wife Consuelo decide to send their daughter Sharon, familiarly known as "Skippy," to boarding school. Wilma Chester's school is going broke, so she permits old acquaintance Milton Shakespeare to bring his theatrical troupe to the school and stage a Thanksgiving show, hoping Skippy's dad will attend and offer everyone work in his professional theatrical revues.

Skippy is reluctant to perform until handsome songwriter Jimmy Tuttle changes her mind. She is shocked, however, when her father rejects an invitation to the show, unaware that Consuelo has answered it without showing it to him. Another shock comes when Eve Bronson turns up, claiming Jimmy's about to marry her and only pretending to like Skippy.

Once he learns about the show, Charles is delighted to come. By this time Skippy wants no part of it, but Jimmy carries her to the stage, convinces her to entertain, then drops to one knee and proposes marriage to her.

== Cast ==
- Eleanore Whitney as Skippy Dormant
- Robert Cummings as Jimmy Tuttle
- William Frawley as Milton Shakespeare
- Elizabeth Patterson as Wilma Chester
- Roscoe Karns as Doc 'Short Circuit' Wilson
- John Halliday as Charles Dormant
- Grace Bradley as Eve Bronson
- Veda Ann Borg as Consuelo Dormant
- Louis Da Pron as Elmer
- Olympe Bradna as Frenchy
- Billy Lee as Johnny
- Irving Bacon as Rider
- Si Wells as Winton
- Inez Courtney as Dorothy
- Phillips Smalley as Mr. Courtney Netherland
- Florence Wix as Mrs. Courtney Netherland
- Kitty McHugh as Wardrobe Mistress
- Cynthia Duane as Makeup Girl
- Donald Kerr as Property Man

== Production ==
Cummings was cast in December 1935. Filming started in March 1936.

== Reception ==
Frank Nugent of The New York Times said, "There came shyly yesterday to the Roxy Theatre a picture called Three Cheers for Love, and the best we can do is describe it as Hollywood's equivalent of the employes' annual picnic. Paramount—if our inference is correct—must have summoned a select number of its juveniles, praised them for their loyalty to the firm and, as a reward for good behavior, told them they could take a cameraman, director, a few sets and one of the lesser scripts and make a picture all by themselves. We gather that the youngsters enjoyed the picnic, but Paramount has no right to ask us to pay the bill."
