= College Holiday =

1936 film by Frank Tuttle

- Theatrical poster
- Directed by: Frank Tuttle
- Written by: J.P. McEvoy; Harlan Ware; Jay Gorney; Henry Myers
- Produced by: William LeBaron; Harlan Thompson
- Starring: Jack Benny; George Burns; Gracie Allen; Martha Raye
- Cinematography: Theodor Sparkuhl
- Edited by: LeRoy Stone
- Music by: Score: Boris Morros; Songs: Burton Lane (music); Ralph Freed (lyrics); Ralph Rainger (music); Leo Robin (lyrics)
- Production company: Paramount Pictures
- Distributed by: Paramount Pictures
- Release date: December 19, 1936
- Running time: 86 minutes
- Country: United States
- Language: English

College Holiday is a 1936 American comedy film directed by Frank Tuttle and starring Jack Benny, George Burns, Gracie Allen and Martha Raye. It was produced and distributed by Paramount Pictures.

== Plot ==
A woman hotelier with an interest in eugenics invites some young men to spend the summer.

Genetic theories are satirized. The final song and dance number features some of the cast performing a blackface minstrel show.

== Cast ==
- Jack Benny as J. Davis Bowster
- George Burns as George Hymen
- Gracie Allen as Calliope 'Gracie' Dove
- Mary Boland as Carola P. Gaye
- Martha Raye as Daisy Schloggenheimer
- Ben Blue as Stage Hand
- Marsha Hunt as Sylvia Smith
- Leif Erickson as Dick Winters
- Eleanore Whitney as Eleanore Wayne
- Johnny Downs as Johnny Jones
- Ellen Drew as Dancer on Train
- California Collegians as California Collegians

== Reception ==
New York Times reviewer Frank Nugent wrote that the film benefited from a "good-humored informality which protects the piece against too biting a review"...(the film)..."demands nothing of the beholder but unlimited patience or an appetite for the ageless rudiments of vaudeville."

In their March, 1937 edition, Modern Screen gave the film a two-star review and wrote, "Vaudeville de luxe is here offered for the price of a seat at the movies … To give you an idea, there are the following headliners: Jack Benny, George Burns and Gracie Allen, Martha Raye, Mary Boland, Ben Blue and Eleanore Whitney. They're all up to their familiar and inimitable tricks which, combined, almost disguise the fact that what's missing is a story." Despite this, the review concluded with the assessment : "It’s good entertainment."

Robert Osborne appeared in an Introduction & Outro for Turner Classic Movies.

== Sources ==
- Fuller-Seeley, Kathryn. Jack Benny and the Golden Age of American Radio Comedy. University of California Press, 2017.
- Michael Leannah, ed., Well! Reflections of the Life and Career of Jack Benny
- Irving Fein, Jack Benny: An Intimate Biography
