= Thrill of a Lifetime (film) =

1937 film by George Archainbaud

- Theatrical release poster
- Directed by: George Archainbaud
- Screenplay by: Seena Owen; Grant Garett; Paul Gerard Smith
- Story by: Seena Owen; Grant Garett
- Produced by: Fanchon
- Starring: James V. Kern; Charles Adler; George Kelly; Billy Mann; Judy Canova; Ben Blue; Eleanore Whitney
- Cinematography: William C. Mellor
- Edited by: Doane Harrison
- Music by: Gordon Jenkins; John Leipold
- Production company: Paramount Pictures
- Distributed by: Paramount Pictures
- Release date: December 3, 1937
- Running time: 75 minutes
- Country: United States
- Language: English

Thrill of a Lifetime is a 1937 American comedy film directed by George Archainbaud produced by Fanchon, and written by Seena Owen, Grant Garett and Paul Gerard Smith. The film stars James V. Kern, Charles Adler, George Kelly, Billy Mann—at the time a musical-comedy act called the Yacht Club Boys—along with Judy Canova, Ben Blue and Eleanore Whitney.

Betty Grable also is featured, and Dorothy Lamour makes a cameo appearance in the film. It was released on December 3, 1937, by Paramount Pictures.

== Plot ==
The performing act of Betty Jane and Stanley, along with her colorful sister Judy, comes to Camp Romance, an island retreat run by "Howdy" Nelson, who offers unattached men and women a place to meet. Howdy's attractive secretary Gwen wants to get better acquainted with him.

Stanley wants to find a suitable romantic partner for Judy because, unbeknownst to her sister, a theatrical agent wants to book the act, provided Judy's not a part of it. Judy takes a shine to boat captain Skipper on the way to camp, where Stanley also bribes lifeguard Don into making a play for her.

After a case of mistaken identity ends up with the theatrical agent held against his will, the act entertains and Judy steals the show. They get the job, Judy gets Skipper and her new friend Gwen finally catches the eye of Howdy.

== Cast ==
- James V. Kern as Jimmie
- Charles Adler as Charlie
- George Kelly as George
- Billy Mann as Billy
- Judy Canova as Judy Canova
- Ben Blue as Skipper
- Eleanore Whitney as Betty Jane
- Johnny Downs as Stanley
- Betty Grable as Gwen
- Leif Erickson as Howard 'Howdy' Nelson
- Buster Crabbe as Don
- The Fanchonettes as Dancing Ensemble
- Dorothy Lamour as Specialty
- Zeke Canova as Zeke Canova
- Anne Canova as Anne Canova
- Tommy Wonder as Billy
- Franklin Pangborn as Sam Williams
- June Schafer as Receptionist
- Howard M. Mitchell as Business Executive
- Si Jenks as Messenger Boy
