= Florida Special =

1936 film by Ralph Murphy

- Directed by: Ralph Murphy
- Written by: David Boehm; Marguerite Roberts; Laura Perelman; S. J. Perelman
- Produced by: Albert Lewis
- Starring: Jack Oakie; Sally Eilers; Kent Taylor; Frances Drake; Claude Gillingwater; Sam Hearn
- Cinematography: Leo Tover
- Edited by: James Smith
- Music by: Charles Bradshaw; John Leipold
- Production company: Paramount Pictures
- Distributed by: Paramount Pictures
- Release date: April 21, 1936
- Running time: 70 minutes
- Country: United States
- Language: English

Florida Special is a 1936 American comedy film directed by Ralph Murphy and written by David Boehm, Marguerite Roberts, Laura Perelman and S. J. Perelman. The film stars Jack Oakie, Sally Eilers, Kent Taylor, Frances Drake, Claude Gillingwater and Sam Hearn. The film was released on April 21, 1936, by Paramount Pictures.

== Plot ==
Newspaper reporter Bangs Carter and his rich buddy Wally Tucker end up on the Florida Special train bound for Florida with jewel thieves and Wally's ex-girlfriend. Bangs falls for a passenger, Jerry Quinn, along the way as they try to catch the crooks.

== Cast ==
- Jack Oakie as Bangs Carter
- Sally Eilers as Jerry Quinn
- Kent Taylor as Wally Tucker
- Frances Drake as Marina Landon
- Claude Gillingwater as Simeon Stafford
- Sam Hearn as Schlepperman
- J. Farrell MacDonald as Captain Timothy Harrigan
- Sidney Blackmer as Jack Macklyn
- Matthew Betz as Herman Weil
- Dwight Frye as Jenkins
- Garry Owen as Joe
- Clyde Dilson as Dominic
- Mack Gray as Louie
- Stanley Andrews as Armstrong
