= Yacht Club Boys =

Quartet of American comic singers

The Yacht Club Boys were a quartet of American comic singers, popular in the 1920s and 1930s. The best-known set of Yacht Club Boys consisted of Charlie Adler, George Kelly, Jimmie Kern, and Billy Mann. They made recordings from the 1920s and appeared as a specialty act in several feature films and short subjects of the 1930s. The Yacht Club Boys' screen career and on-screen behavior paralleled those of The Ritz Brothers, a musical-comedy trio doing the same type of musical burlesques.

Charlie Adler, son of a New York tailor, broke into show business in 1919 as a singer (alongside future stars Jimmy Durante and Vincent Lopez) in a Coney Island beer parlor, and spent the next 12 years on stage in America and Europe. George Kelly was a dancer, singer, and comedian in eastern cabarets. Jimmie Kern spent six years studying law at Fordham University and another two years practicing law. Billy Mann worked in vaudeville and worked with Sophie Tucker in the Ziegfeld Follies. The four men joined forces in 1931 and worked steadily through 1939.

== Early years ==
The Yacht Club Boys began in 1926 as a "smart set" nightclub act: Chick Endor (born Charles Knapton, Jr., lead vocalist and guitarist), George Walsh (piano), Tommy Purcell (violin), and Billy Mann (comedian). They earned high billing and high salaries almost immediately, and embarked on a European tour within their first year. Variety's Sime Silverman explained how they went so far so fast: "Society took to the young men when they were at the Yacht Club [nightclub], since padlocked. While they didn't get so much coin as at the Yacht Club, they did build up quite a following from the social set. That following is with them now. They come to the cabaret to see and hear the boys and they engage the boys for their private affairs. As the cabaret work does not start before 11:30, it gives the young men plenty of time during the evening to waste a few $300 hours [equivalent to an hourly rate of $5,200 today]. It's a new wrinkle, charging for private entertaining by the hour." The team specialized in comic novelty numbers, such as "How Could Little Red Riding Hood Have Been So Very Good, and Still Kept the Wolf from the Door?" The group signed a two-year contract with Brunswick Records in July 1926.

In 1929 Jimmie Kern -- after closing his legal practice -- replaced Tommy Purcell, who had retired from show business: "Purcell is worth $1,000,000 [$18,000,000 today] through wise investments and the inheritance of two Chicago apartment houses," according to Variety. The act became "collegiate" with the group now dressed in varsity-styled sweaters and slacks, and singing novelty tunes in breezy fashion ("I'm Wild About Horns on an Automobile", "Nasty Nancy, the Meanest Gal in Town"). This foursome appeared in musical short subjects for Vitaphone and for Paramount Pictures in 1929–30. Endor and Walsh each had marital problems resulting in financial troubles and heavy alimony penalties for at least two years, and withdrew from the act in June 1930. By this time Billy Mann had become the leader behind the scenes, handling all the business details for the group. Endor returned six months later so the group could accept a lucrative private engagement hosted by American sportsman Victor Emanuel (for which the group received $6,800 -- about $130,000 in 2025 dollars), and songwriter-pianist Sammy Fain sat in for the absent George Walsh. Endor left the group again in early 1931, never to return. He was still plagued with marital troubles; Variety headlined "Endor Still in Coop over Alimony Jam." He died in 1941.

== Adler, Kelly, Kern, and Mann ==
In 1931 Charlie Adler and George Kelly joined Billy Mann and Jimmie Kern, and this became the permanent personnel. The Yacht Club Boys became strictly comic singers, abandoning their musical instruments, and refined their act to include sharper, broader humor, satirizing current events and trends. For example, "The Super-Special Picture of the Year" took aim at Hollywood hyperbole in general ("It's colossal, tremendous, gigantic, stupendous!") and famous movie director Ernst Lubitsch in particular, as voiced by Charlie Adler. They composed much of their own material, credited in alphabetical order to "Adler, Kelly, Kern, and Mann" (although Kern was the chief writer). Syndicated Broadway columnist Gilbert Swan noted, "In the night life quartet field, the Yacht Club Boys, now appearing at the fashionable Cafe Montparnasse, still have no rivals -- particularly in the preparation of original songs."

They starred in short subjects for Paramount in 1933–34, then for Vitaphone in 1935–36, with titles emphasizing their wacky approach: Dough-Nuts, The Vodka Boatmen, etc. They also maintained a busy schedule of network radio appearances and recording sessions.

The Yacht Club Boys brought great energy to their performances, with brash songs like "You're Broke, You Dope" and "My, How the Country's Changed." Perhaps their most familiar screen appearances are in Al Jolson's The Singing Kid (1936), in which the four outspoken comics persistently try to keep Jolson from singing outdated "mammy songs", and the collegiate musical Pigskin Parade (1936), in which they perform their specialties at college rallies. Reviewer Harold W. Cohen noted of The Singing Kid: "Although [Jolson] labors diligently and with his customary fondness for sentimentality, you will come away [from the theater] remembering chiefly those remarkable Yacht Club Boys. A foursome with a distinctly original style, they sing of newsy topics with satirical straightforwardness, and that number in which they try to dissuade Mr. Jolson from extolling his mammy is a superb piece of tomfoolery."

In 1937 the Yacht Club Boys headed the cast of their only starring feature, the Paramount musical Thrill of a Lifetime.

The mid-1930s were the Yacht Club Boys' busiest period, as syndicated columnist Paul Harrison observed: "The Yacht Club Boys have a way of popping up almost anywhere. Leave them on Broadway with their name in lights, go to London, and you'll likely find them chanting their topical ditties in the Café de Paris. Or go to Miami and you'll run smack into them in the lobby of the Fleetwood. You see them on trains; you stand in line with them at the mutuel windows at Santa Anita; you find them playing bridge at Saratoga. Drive out in the middle of the desert and turn on your radio -- the Yacht Club Boys again." They returned to the New York nightclub scene in October 1938, after an absence of two years.

== Other activities ==
The group pursued other interests and disbanded in May 1939. Jimmie Kern was the first to leave, settling in Hollywood to become a screenwriter and later a director. To fulfill the quartet's remaining commitments, Kern was replaced by singer Jimmie Craig. Later in 1939 Billy Mann, a successful investor, bought the Irving Aaronson orchestra outright, retaining Aaronson as pianist. George Kelly and Charlie Adler carried on as a double act, "Kelly & Adler, the Yacht Club Boys". In May 1940 they became restaurateurs, buying the Tavern restaurant (formerly Billy LaHiff's Tavern) on 48th Street in New York City, popular with show-business professionals. Billy Mann followed their lead in March 1941, opening "the world's biggest restaurant" near the army camp in San Diego, California, featuring no fewer than 11 bars. Adler & Kelly left their own restaurant when Billy LaHiff's son took over his father's premises.

Adler and Kelly revived the Yacht Club Boys quartet in 1942, for a new nightclub act. They added new members Rodney McLennon and Bill Dwyer. Later that year Adler and Kelly disbanded the quartet and joined a USO troupe (as the Yacht Club Boys) for a six-month tour of Tunisia, Egypt, the Far East, and war zones in the Pacific. In October 1943 Adler and Kelly headlined at the Last Frontier hotel in Las Vegas, Nevada, followed by an engagement at Maxie Rosenbloom's nightclub in San Francisco. While in California they announced their availability for motion-picture work, to no avail. They retired from performing and pursued their business interests.

== Later years ==
Charlie Adler and George Kelly remained partners in a succession of nightclub and restaurant ventures (one was called the Stut 'n' Tut, Australian slang for steaks and chops). Adler died in 1955, survived by his wife, stage and nightclub singer Yvonne Bouvier. Kelly opened "Kelly's Deli" in New York City in 1960.

Jimmie Kern became known professionally as Hollywood director James V. Kern, directing many motion pictures and the I Love Lucy TV series; he was married to Ethel Lawrence, formerly of "George White's Scandals". He died in 1966.

Billy Mann, who had been an individual investor, became a professional stockbroker; he was married to the former Wynn Davis from 1945 to 1949. In 1948 he partnered with George Raft to operate the Desert Retreat hotel in Palm Springs, California. He died in 1974.

== Partial filmography ==
- The Singing Fool (1928)
- On the High C's (short, 1929)
- Deep "C" Melodies (short, 1930)
- A Private Engagement (short, 1930)
- Hear Ye! Hear Ye! (short, 1934)
- Broadway Knights (short, 1934)
- Thanks a Million (1935)
- The Vodka Boatmen (short, 1935)
- They're Off (short, 1936)
- Stage Struck (1936)
- Dough-Nuts (short, 1936)
- The Singing Kid (1936)
- Pigskin Parade (1936)
- Artists and Models (1937)
- Thrill of a Lifetime (1937, billed as the stars)
- Cocoanut Grove (1938)
- Artists and Models Abroad (1938)
