= Benny Baker =

American actor and comedian (1907–1994)

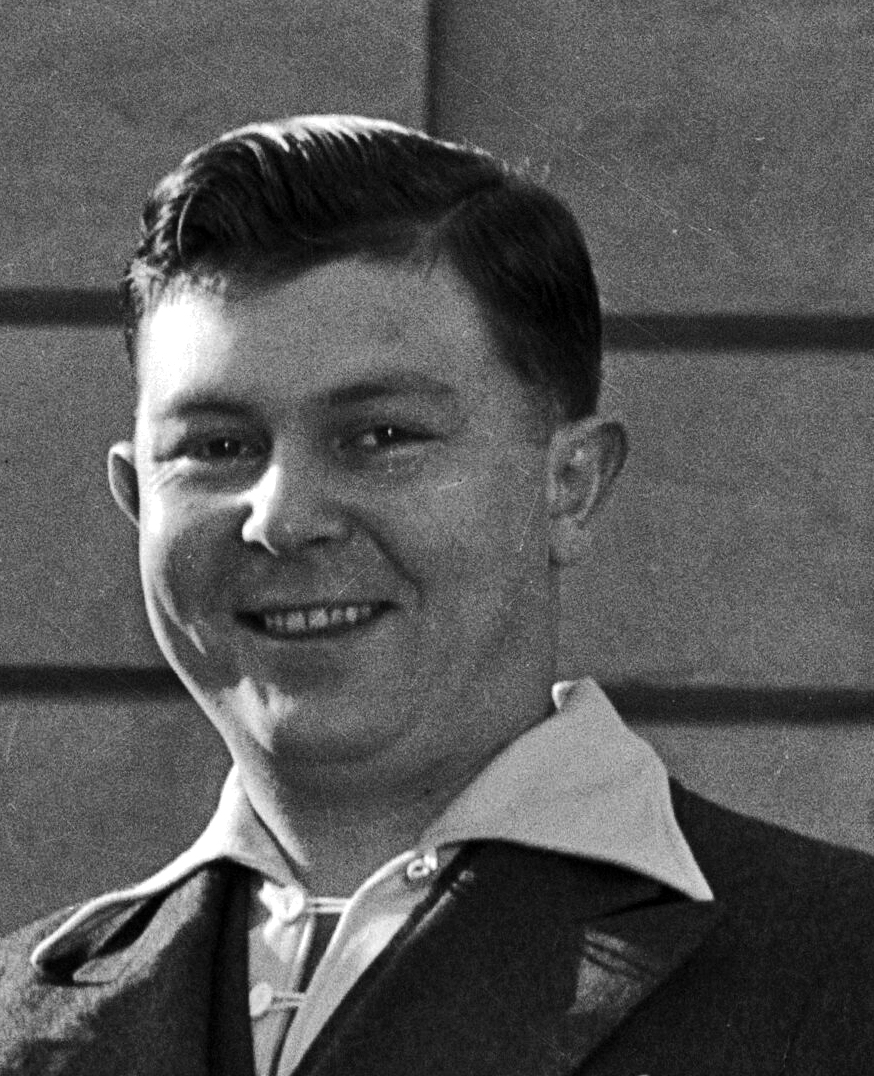
- Baker in 1936
- Born: May 5, 1907; St. Joseph, Missouri
- Died: September 20, 1994 (aged 87); Woodland Hills, Los Angeles, California
- Occupation(s): Actor, comedian
- Spouses: Edith Turgell; Margery Chapin

Benny Baker (born Benjamin Michael Zifkin; May 5, 1907 – September 20, 1994) was an American film and theater actor and comedian, and appeared in over 50 films between 1934 and 1988. He died in Woodland Hills, Los Angeles, California.

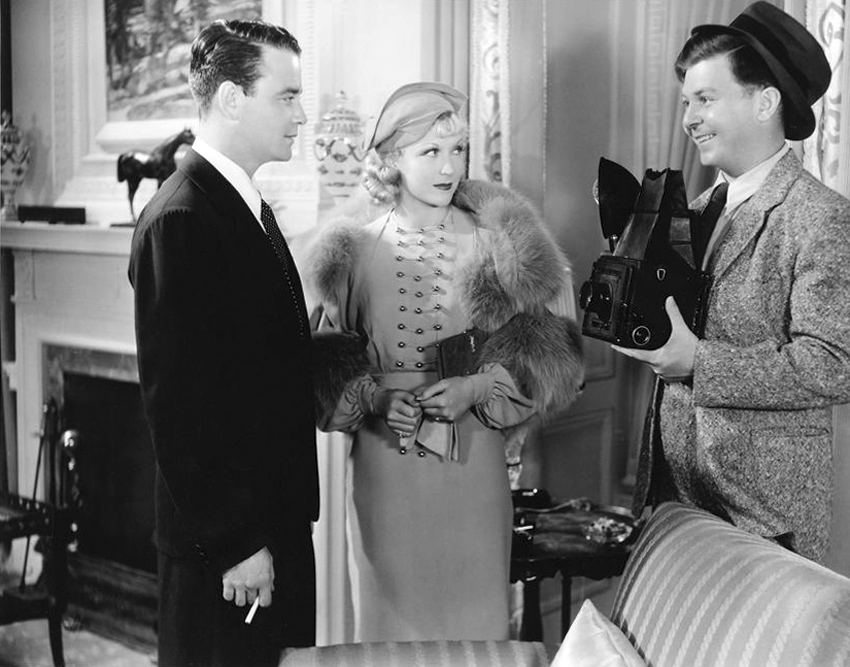
Lew Ayres, Joyce Compton and Benny Baker in Murder With Pictures (1936)

== Filmography ==
=== Films ===
- The Hell Cat (1934) as Snapper Dugan
- Belle of the Nineties (1934) as Blackie
- A Wicked Woman (1934) (uncredited)
- Love in Bloom (1935) as Man who buys radio
- College Scandal (1935) as 'Cuffie' Lewis
- Annapolis Farewell (1935) as Zimmer
- Wanderer of the Wasteland (1935) as Piano player
- The Big Broadcast of 1936 (1935) as Herman
- Thanks a Million (1935) as Tammany
- Millions in the Air (1935) as Benny
- Rose of the Rancho (1936) as Hill-Billy Boy
- Drift Fence (1936) as Jim Traft
- Give Us This Night (1936) as Tomasso
- Panic on the Air (1936) as Andy
- Lady Be Careful (1936) as Barney
- Murder with Pictures (1936) as Phil Doane
- Rose Bowl (1936) as Dutch Schultz
- Mind Your Own Business (1936) as Sparrow
- Champagne Waltz (1937) as Flip
- The Crime Nobody Saw (1937) as Horace Dryden
- Hotel Haywire (1937) as Bertie Sterns
- Wild Money (1937) as Al Vogel
- Blonde Trouble (1937) as Maxie Schwartz
- Double or Nothing (1937) as Sailor
- That Navy Spirit (1937) as Stuffy Miller
- Love on Toast (1937) as Egbert
- Tip-Off Girls (1937) as Scotty
- Touchdown, Army (1938) as Cadet Dick Mycroft
- His Exciting Night (1938) as Taxicab Driver
- She Married a Cop (1939) as Sidney
- Dancing Co-Ed (1939) as Chief Evans (uncredited)
- The Farmer's Daughter (1940) as Monk Gordon
- Sing for Your Supper (1941) as William
- Captains of the Clouds (1942) as Popcorn Kearns
- Stage Door Canteen (1942) as Beny Baker
- Up in Arms (1944) as Butterball
- Joe Palooka in the Knockout (1947) as Looie
- My Girl Tisa (1948) as Herman
- Smart Woman (1948) as Junior - Photographer (uncredited)
- Jinx Money (1948) as Augie Pollack
- The Babe Ruth Story (1948) as Player (uncredited)
- Homicide for Three (1948) as Timothy, Cab Driver
- Rose of the Yukon (1949) as Jack Wells
- Joe Palooka in the Big Fight (1949) as Fight Secretary
- Manhattan Angel (1949) as Aloysius Duff
- Manhandled (1949) as Boyd, Man in Apartment House Lobby with Girl (uncredited)
- The Inspector General (1949) as Telecki (uncredited)
- Loan Shark (1952) as Tubby
- Young Man with Ideas (1952) as Bill Collector
- Models Inc. (1952) as Freddy
- Feudin' Fools (1952) as Corky
- Somebody Loves Me (1952) as Musician (uncredited)
- Thunderbirds (1952) as Private Charles Klassen
- I Love Lucy: The Movie (1953) as Audience Member
- Public Pigeon No. 1 (1957) as Frankie Frannis
- No Time for Sergeants (1958) as Captain Jim Able (uncredited)
- Papa's Delicate Condition (1963) as Douglas
- For Those Who Think Young (1964) as Lou
- Boy, Did I Get a Wrong Number! (1966) as Detective Lieutenant Schwartz
- The Wicked Dreams of Paula Schultz (1968) as Cab Driver
- Some Kind of a Nut (1969) as The Cabbie (as Ben Baker)
- Paint Your Wagon (1969) as Haywood Holbrook (as Ben Baker)
- Scandalous John (1971) as Dr. Kropak (as Ben Baker)
- Jory as Frank Jordan (as Ben Baker)
- The Sting II (1983) as Pyle
- Kidco (1984) as Judge Willoughby
- The Longshot (1986) as Mr. Hooper
- Monster in the Closet (1987) as Mr. McGinty
- 18 Again! (1988) as Red

=== Short films ===
- School for Romance (1934) as Male student (uncredited)
- When Do We Eat (1934) as Showalski
- I'll Be Suing You (1934) as Building Repairman
- Three Chumps Ahead (1934) as Benny Baker, Second Suitor
- You Said A Hatful! (1934) as Train Engineer (uncredited)
- The Ballad of Paducah Jail (1934) as Reporter Outside Jail
- You Bring the Ducks (1934) as Nephew
- Radio Take It Away (1947)) as Radio Program Emcee
- Birch Street Gym (1991) as Nate

== Television credits ==
- Kraft Theater (1955)
- Studio One (1955) as Harvey
- The Milton Berle Show (1956)
- NBC Matinee Theater (1956)
- Playhouse 90 (1956)
- General Electric Theater (1957)
- The Life of Riley (1957) as Lambert
- The George Burns and Gracie Allen Show (1957) as Mr. Syms
- Maverick (1957) as Mike Brill
- The Real McCoys (1957) as Mr. Feeley
- The Thin Man (1957) as Curly Bascom
- Leave It to Beaver (1957) as Barber
- M Squad (1958) as Dutch
- Colt .45 (1958) as Bartender / Hotel Clerk
- The Red Skelton Hour (1957-1958) as L. G. Heath Jr. / Sir Lancelot
- Sugarfoot (1958) as Irving
- Alfred Hitchcock Presents (1958) (Season 3 Episode 31: "The Festive Season") as Al the Bartender
- Man Without a Gun (1958) as Phil
- The People's Choice (1958) as Harry Bailey
- The Silent Service (1957-1958) as Mayhew the Cook / Heinz
- The Bob Cummings Show (1958) as Hafter's Stooge
- Schlitz Playhouse (1957-1958) as Regal Hotel Receptionist / Henry, Cafe Proprietor
- Lawman (1961) as Dave the Bartender
- Surfside 6 (1961) as Joe / Walter / Harry
- Hawaiian Eye (1961) as Jake
- Room for One More (1962) as Jedson
- McKeever and the Colonel (1962) as Mr. Anderson
- Cheyenne (1957-1962) as Barber / Doc Johnson / Tulliver
- The Jack Benny Program (1963) as Herbie
- The Danny Thomas Show (1958-1963) as Mailman / Mr. Foster / Poker Player
- 77 Sunset Strip (1958-1963) as Maxie Tuttle / Doctor / Fred Webber
- The Farmer's Daughter (1964)
- The Cara Williams Show (1964) as Grady
- Broadside (1965) as Charlie Leff
- Hank (1965) as Bakery Man
- Perry Mason (1963-1965) as Jerry Ormond / Jerome Bentley / John Flickinger
- F Troop (1965-1966) as Pete / Pete (Bartender)
- Love on a Rooftop (1966)
- Felony Squad (1967) as Cab Driver
- The Bill Cosby Show (1970) as Mr. Apollo
- Ironside (1970) as Counterman
- Julia (1971) as Mr. Greenburg
- Green Acres (1971) as Bert Beamish
- Charlie's Angels (1977) as Murphy Myrphy
- The Love Boat (1978) as Grandad 'Jack Daniels'
- Kojak (1978) as Danny Fogarty
- Laverne & Shirley (1981) as Reverend Ernie
- Cagney & Lacey (1983) as Wally
- Goodnight, Beantown (1983)
- Trapper John, M.D. (1984) as Fred Romanis
- He's the Mayor (1986) as Benny
- Sledge Hammer! (1987) as Ice Cream Truck Driver
- The Bronx Zoo (1987) as Gideon
- Beauty and the Beast (1987) as Herman
- Out of This World (1988) as Old Man
