= Rose Bowl (film) =

1936 film by Charles Barton

- Theatrical release poster
- Directed by: Charles Barton
- Screenplay by: Marguerite Roberts
- Produced by: A.M. Botsford
- Starring: Eleanore Whitney; Tom Brown; Buster Crabbe; William Frawley; Benny Baker; Nydia Westman
- Cinematography: Henry Sharp
- Edited by: William Shea
- Music by: John Leipold
- Production company: Paramount Pictures
- Distributed by: Paramount Pictures
- Release date: October 30, 1936
- Running time: 75 minutes
- Country: United States
- Language: English

Rose Bowl is a 1936 American comedy film directed by Charles Barton and written by Marguerite Roberts. The film stars Eleanore Whitney, Tom Brown, Buster Crabbe, William Frawley, Benny Baker and Nydia Westman. The film was released on October 30, 1936, by Paramount Pictures.

== Plot ==
"Cheers" Reynolds has a pair of suitors, Paddy O'Riley and Ossie Merrill, both football stars. As the boys leave their hometown for separate colleges, Cheers makes it clear Ossie is the one she prefers.

Ossie neglects writing to her, and when Paddy returns to town, his friend and teammate Dutch Schultz tries to let Cheers know how much Paddy misses her. Dutch himself falls for a newspaper reporter, Florence Taylor.

When their school, Green Ridge, gets invited to play in the Rose Bowl football game, Paddy and Dutch look forward to playing against Ossie's team. The coach, Soapy Moreland, catches his star player Paddy in a room after curfew with Cheers and suspends him from the game. But he has a change of heart, Green Ridge wins and Cheers comes to the locker room to tell Paddy he's her guy.

== Cast ==
- Eleanore Whitney as Cheers Reynolds
- Tom Brown as Paddy O'Riley
- Buster Crabbe as Ossie Merrill
- William Frawley as Soapy Moreland
- Benny Baker as Dutch Schultz
- Nydia Westman as Susie Reynolds
- Nick Lukats as Donovan
- Priscilla Lawson as Florence Taylor
- Adrian Morris as Doc
- Jimmy Conlin as Browning Hills
- Louis Mason as Thornton
- Ellen Drew as Mary Arnold

== See also ==
- List of American football films
