= The Hell Cat (1934 film) =

1934 film directed by Albert S. Rogell

- Directed by: Albert S. Rogell
- Written by: Fred Niblo Jr. Adele Buffington; Joel Sayre
- Produced by: Sid Rogell
- Starring: Robert Armstrong; Ann Sothern; Benny Baker
- Cinematography: Benjamin H. Kline
- Edited by: John Rawlins
- Production company: Columbia Pictures
- Distributed by: Columbia Pictures
- Release date: June 16, 1934
- Running time: 70 minutes
- Country: United States
- Language: English

The Hell Cat is a 1934 pre-Code American crime film directed by Albert S. Rogell and starring Robert Armstrong, Ann Sothern and Benny Baker.

== Cast ==
- Robert Armstrong as Dan Collins
- Ann Sothern as Geraldine Sloane
- Benny Baker as Snapper Dugan
- Minna Gombell as Pauline McCoy
- Purnell Pratt as the butler
- Charles C. Wilson as Graham
- J. Carrol Naish as Joe Morgan
- Irving Bacon as Regan
- Henry Kolker as C.W. Sloane
- Guy Usher as Gillette
- Joseph Crehan as Capt. Barnett
- Ray Mayer as Evans
- Stanley Blystone as Chief Boatswain Mate
- Eddy Chandler as Scotty
- Harry Tenbrook as Sandy
