= Campus Confessions =

1938 film by George Archainbaud

- Directed by: George Archainbaud
- Written by: Lloyd Corrigan
- Starring: Betty Grable; William Henry
- Cinematography: Henry Sharp
- Edited by: Stuart Gilmore
- Distributed by: Paramount Pictures
- Release date: September 23, 1938
- Running time: 67 minutes
- Country: United States
- Language: English

Campus Confessions is a 1938 American comedy film directed by George Archainbaud, featuring Betty Grable in her first starring role, and American basketball player Hank Luisetti in his only film appearance.

== Plot ==
Wayne Atterbury Sr. is president of Middleton College, where he tolerates no foolishness. So when his milquetoast son, Wayne Jr., enrolls as a freshman, the boy makes it clear to newspaper reporter Joyce Gilmore and to every student he meets that school must be all work and no play. This makes him instantly unpopular.

Hank Luisetti plays basketball for the school, which has never had a winning team. He is tempted to switch to a different college when Wayne Jr. offers his father's estate as a training camp. Luisetti is surprised when Wayne turns out to have a knack for the game himself. He becomes a basketball star and Joyce becomes a lot more interested in him.

A big game against arch-rival State U is coming up, and Middleton finally has a shot at winning. Hank, however, flunks math, so Dean Wilton needs to suspend him from the team. The stuffed-shirt Atterbury watches his son play basketball and gets so excited about winning, he approves a new math test for Hank while the game's in progress. Hank passes, then scores 24 points in the final period to help carry Middleton to victory, whereupon both Atterburys are carried off by the happy crowd.

== Cast ==
- Betty Grable as Joyce Gilmore
- Eleanore Whitney as Susie Quinn
- William Henry as Wayne Atterbury Jr.
- Fritz Feld as 'Lady MacBeth'
- John Arledge as Freddy Fry
- Thurston Hall as Wayne Atterbury Sr.
- Roy Gordon as Dean Wilton
- Lane Chandler as Coach Parker
- Richard Denning as Buck Hogan
- Matty Kemp as Ed Riggs
- Sumner Getchell as 'Blimp' Garrett
- Hank Luisetti as himself

== See also ==
- List of basketball films
