= Diamond Head (film) =

1963 film by Guy Green

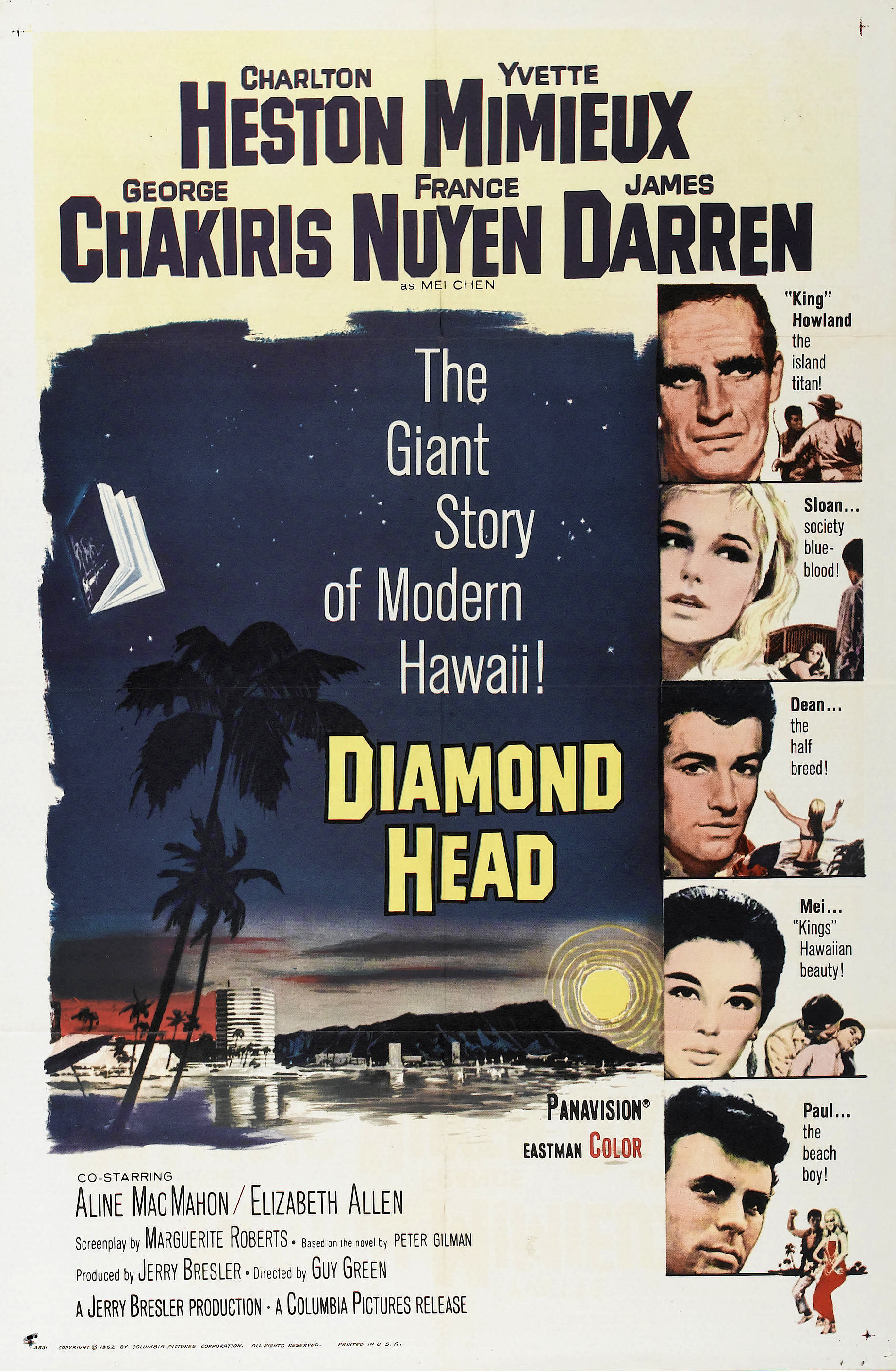
- 1963 theatrical poster
- Directed by: Guy Green
- Screenplay by: Marguerite Roberts
- Based on: Diamond Head; 1960 novel by Peter Gilman
- Produced by: Jerry Bresler
- Starring: Charlton Heston; Yvette Mimieux; George Chakiris; France Nuyen; James Darren
- Cinematography: Sam Leavitt
- Edited by: William A. Lyon
- Music by: John Williams
- Production company: Jerry Bresler Productions
- Distributed by: Columbia Pictures
- Release dates: December 27, 1962 (Japan); January 30, 1963 (Honolulu, Hawaii); February 13, 1963 (Mainland United States)
- Running time: 107 minutes
- Country: United States
- Language: English
- Budget: $3 million
- Box office: $4.5 million (US/ Canada rentals)

Diamond Head is a 1962 Eastmancolor drama romance film starring Charlton Heston, Yvette Mimieux, George Chakiris, and James Darren, directed by Guy Green, and released by Columbia Pictures. The original music score was composed by John Williams, Hugo Winterhalter composed the theme, and Darren sang the title song. The soundtrack album was released by Colpix Records (CP 440). It was released on compact disc in 2006 by Film Score Monthly paired with Lalo Schifrin's Gone with the Wave

Silent film star Billie Dove makes her last film appearance in a brief cameo. It was the first film credit for screenwriter Marguerite Roberts after she was blacklisted for nine years.

== Plot ==
Richard "King" Howland is a swaggering land baron living on the Big Island of Hawaii. He objects when his sister, Sloane Howland, announces she plans to marry Paul Kahana, a native Hawaiian, though Richard is having a torrid affair with an Asian woman, Mai Chen. During Sloane and Paul's engagement party, Mai Chen's brother attacks Richard with a knife. Paul tries to break up the fight and is killed. Bitter at her brother for Paul's death, Sloane runs off to Honolulu, where she is taken in by Paul's brother, Dean, and his family.

Meanwhile, Mai Chen gives birth to Richard's child, but dies during childbirth. Richard refuses to accept the child, so Sloane takes it upon herself to care for the baby. After an angry fight with Sloane and Dean, Richard is confronted with a personal dilemma—whether to continue on with his close-minded ways or to welcome his newborn son into his family.

=== Relation to source material ===
Although the story is based on the novel by Peter Gilman, the screenplay by Marguerite Roberts makes several significant changes in Gilman's story. Several characters are eliminated, including Richard's father, Richard's wife, and his hapa haole (half-Hawaiian/half white) half-brother. Roberts also changed the ending of the story.

== Cast ==
Actor	Role
Charlton Heston	Richard "King" Howland
Yvette Mimieux	Sloane Howland
George Chakiris	Dr. Dean Kahana
France Nuyen	Mai Chen
James Darren	Paul Kahana
Aline MacMahon	Kapiolani Kahana
Elizabeth Allen	Laura Beckett
Vaughn Taylor	Judge James Blanding
Philip Ahn	Mr. Immacona
Edward Mallory	Robert Parsons
Marc Marno	Bobby Chen

== Production ==
Clark Gable was originally slated for Heston's role but died before production began. "I suppose every studio in town had projects waiting for Gable," Heston wrote in his memoirs. "Had he lived to do the film, he would have been a widower and the kid sister his daughter, but the adjusted script worked just as well, though the King’s shoes were a loose fit for me."

Charlton Heston was sent the script and wrote about it in his diary on 12 December 1961 calling it a good part in an overwritten and melodramatic script. If it's treated with good care it might work out alright." Heston met with Guy Green, who he liked, and both men wanted Yvette Mimieux to play the female lead. It seemed she would not be available and Carroll Baker was discussed - Heston said "I don't think Carrol Baker is right". Then Mimieux became available and Heston wrote "On the basis of what we saw in Light in the Piazza she’s ideal for the part. My main concern now is to see what kind of rewriting Guy can elicit from our scrivener." George Chakiris was cast following his success in West Side Story.

Filming began on the island of Kauai in March 1962, with the unit moving to Honolulu in April for further work, then to the studio in Los Angeles. Filming finished in May. Heston wrote "It’s hard to tell what I think now, except that I’m still high on Green. He may have made a film that rises above the melodramatic qualities of the script. He didn’t push me as hard as I should be pushed, but he gave me a lot, all the same." (Heston would later recommend Green take over from Nicholas Ray on 55 Days at Peking.)

Heston saw a cut of the film in October. He wrote it "looks very slick, smooth, not terribly real, and as though there might be some money in it. I have acted better. I must not indicate." In his memoirs, Heston wrote " I never have figured out why I feel that I fell short on that film. Looking back on what I've written about it here, I notice I had a lot to say about my family coming to visit and the quality of the horse. No, that’s not a crack about the people who made the film, but maybe I was focusing on the wrong agenda when we shot Diamond Head."

Guy Green called it a "potboiler" but he enjoyed working with Heston.

== Reception ==
Heston wrote in 1996 "The film turned out to be outrageously successful; I still get checks. I haven’t seen it in a number of years; I’m not sure how good I thought it really was, though it did serve to show again that I could carry a film alone."

In October 1965 Heston listed the movie as one he had made which was a "bust with me and the critics", along with The Pigeon That Took Rome, The Buccaneer and Major Dundee.

A line in Diamond Head inspired Hank Cochran to write the song Make The World Go Away.

This film was also unique in portraying the Hawaii of the early 1960s, featuring a cast of many Hawaiian locals.

== See also ==
- List of American films of 1962

== Bibliography ==
- Heston, Charlton (1979). The actor's life : journals, 1956-1976. Pocket Books. ISBN 978-0-671-83016-8.
- Heston, Charlton (1996). In the Arena: The Autobiography. HarperCollins. ISBN 978-0-00-638777-0.
