= Hollywood Boulevard (1936 film) =

1936 film by Robert Florey

- Directed by: Robert Florey
- Written by: Faith Thomas; Max Marcin; Marguerite Roberts
- Distributed by: Paramount Pictures
- Release date: August 21, 1936
- Running time: 75 minutes
- Country: United States
- Language: English

Hollywood Boulevard is a comedy film directed by Robert Florey and released on August 21, 1936, by Paramount Pictures.

== Plot ==
Has-been actor John Blakeford agrees to write his memoirs for magazine publisher Jordan Winston.

When Blakeford's daughter, Patricia, asks him to desist for the sake of his ex-wife, Carlotta Blakeford, he attempts to break his contract with Winston.

== Cast ==
- John Halliday as John Blakeford
- Marsha Hunt as Patricia Blakeford
- Robert Cummings as Jay Wallace
- C. Henry Gordon as Jordan Winslow
- Esther Ralston as Flora Moore
- Esther Dale as Martha
- Frieda Inescort as Alice Winslow
- Albert Conti as Sanford, Trocadero manager
- Thomas E. Jackson as detective
- Oscar Apfel as Dr. Inslow
- Purnell Pratt as Mr. Steinman
- Irving Bacon as Gus, Trocadero bartender
- Richard Powell as Pete Moran
- Rita La Roy as Nella
- Francis X. Bushman as director, desert scene
- Maurice Costello as director
- Betty Compson as Betty
- Mae Marsh as Carlotta Blakeford
- Charles Ray as Charlie Smith, assistant director
- Herbert Rawlinson as manager of Grauman's
- Jane Novak as Mrs. Steinman
- Bryant Washburn as Robert Martin
- Jack Mulhall as actor at Trocadero bar
- Creighton Hale as actor at Trocadero bar
- Roy D'Arcy as The Sheik
- Jack Mower as Frank Stucky, director
- Frank Mayo as actor at Trocadero bar
- Harry Myers as actor at Trocadero bar
- Mabel Forrest as mother at Chinese Theatre
- Tom Kennedy as bouncer at Pago Pago
- Pat O'Malley as Pago Pago patron
- Lois Kent as little girl at Grauman's Chinese Theatre
- Eleanore Whitney as patron at Grauman's Chinese Theatre
- Evelyn Brent (scenes deleted)
- Louise Brooks (scenes deleted)
- William Farnum (scenes deleted)
- Alice Lake (scenes deleted)
- Florence Lawrence (scenes deleted)
- Harold Lloyd as Harold Lloyd, cameo appearance (scenes deleted)
- Rosemary Theby (scenes deleted)
- Dorothy Wilson (scenes deleted)
- William Bailey as Trocadero patron (uncredited)
- Bobby Barber as man with gong (uncredited)
- Edmund Burns as Pago Pago patron (uncredited)
- Edward Cecil as butler (uncredited)
- Ethel Clayton (uncredited)
- Ruth Clifford as nurse (uncredited)
- Gary Cooper as actor at Trocadero bar (uncredited)
- Edgar Dearing as motorcycle cop (uncredited)
- William Desmond as Pago Pago patron (uncredited)
- Ellen Drew as Terry Ray, casting office secretary (uncredited)
- Lowell Drew as doorman at Trocadero (uncredited)
- Eddie Dunn as grip (uncredited)
- Ann Evers (uncredited)
- Hyman Fink as Snapshot Hymie (uncredited)
- Jerry Fletcher as vendor (uncredited)
- James Ford as Pago Pago patron (uncredited)
- Margaret Harrison as Pago Pago patron (uncredited)
- Robert Homans as Gray (uncredited)
- Margaret Mann as woman in casting office (uncredited)
- Marshall Neilan as Cinegrill customer (uncredited)

== Production ==
The casting was announced in June 1936. Many former silent era actors had small roles.

== Reception ==
Frank Nugent of The New York Times was critical of the film: "It is, as you may judge, a pretty hoary melodrama and [a] slight enough excuse for a whole series of homilies upon the uncertainty of fame and fortune in the glamour city."
