= College Scandal =

1935 film by Elliott Nugent

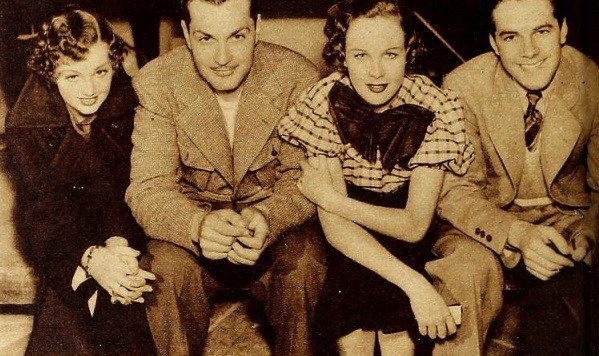
- Arline Judge, Kent Taylor, Wendy Barrie, and Johnny Downs
- Directed by: Elliott Nugent
- Screenplay by: Frank Partos; Charles Brackett; Marguerite Roberts
- Story by: Beulah Marie Dix; Bertram Millhauser
- Produced by: Albert Lewis
- Starring: Arline Judge; Kent Taylor; Wendy Barrie; William Frawley; Benny Baker; William Benedict; Mary Nash
- Cinematography: Theodor Sparkuhl
- Edited by: William Shea
- Music by: Friedrich Hollaender; John Leipold
- Production company: Paramount Pictures
- Distributed by: Paramount Pictures
- Release date: June 21, 1935
- Running time: 76 minutes
- Country: United States
- Language: English

College Scandal is a 1935 American comedy film directed by Elliott Nugent and written by Frank Partos, Charles Brackett and Marguerite Roberts. The film stars Arline Judge, Kent Taylor, Wendy Barrie, William Frawley, Benny Baker, William Benedict and Mary Nash. The film was released on June 21, 1935, by Paramount Pictures.

== Plot ==
Julie Fresnel, the daughter of a new French professor on the campus of Rudgate College, becomes the center of all attractions. One of her admirers get murdered, followed by a second and a third one. Eventually, she is rescued from a house with a time bomb.

== Cast ==
- Arline Judge as Sally Dunlap
- Kent Taylor as Seth Dunlap
- Wendy Barrie as Julie Fresnel
- William Frawley as Chief of Police Magoun
- Benny Baker as 'Cuffie' Lewis
- William Benedict as 'Penny' Parker
- Mary Nash as Mrs. Fresnel
- Edward Nugent as Jake Lansing
- William Stack as Dr. Henri Fresnel
- Johnny Downs as Paul Gedney
- Robert Kent as Dan Courtridge
- Joyce Compton as Toby Carpenter
- Samuel S. Hinds as Mr. Cummings
- Douglas Wood as Dean Traynor
- Edith Arnold as Posey
- Helena Phillips Evans as Melinda
- Mary Ellen Brown as Marjorie
- Stanley Andrews as Jim
- Oscar Smith as Generation Jones
- Oscar Rudolph as Olson
