= Fanchon and Marco =

American dancer and theatrical producer duo

Fanchon Simon
- Born: Fanchon Lucille Wolff; September 14, 1892; Los Angeles, California, U.S.
- Died: February 3, 1965 (aged 72); Los Angeles, U.S
- Occupations: Dancer, theatrical producer, entrepreneur

Fanchon and Marco, 1920s

Marco Wolff
- Born: April 21, 1894; Los Angeles, California, U.S.
- Died: October 23, 1977 (aged 83); Los Angeles, U.S
- Occupations: Dancer, theatrical producer, entrepreneur

Fanchon and Marco were a duo of American dancers, theatrical producers, and entrepreneurs. A sister and brother, they performed as dancers in vaudeville and later produced spectacular theatrical dance shows, mainly in the 1920s and 1930s, as well as a range of other show business services. They were Fanchon Simon (born Fanchon Lucille Wolff; September 14, 1892 – February 3, 1965), and her brother Marco Wolff (April 21, 1894 – October 23, 1977).

== Biography ==
Fanchon and Marco were among the children of Esther and Isaac Wolff, who were Russian Jewish immigrants to the United States. They were both born in Los Angeles; some sources give their birth names as Fanny and Michael. They started their career in their parents' act, Wolff's Juvenile Orchestra. By 1902, billed as "Fanchon and Marco" they started performing together as dancers in vaudeville. By 1919, they started producing revues together, and their first major success was a 1921 touring show, Sun-Kist, featuring a chorus line of dancers.

In 1922 they began producing prologues for movie showings, initially at the Paramount Theatre, the largest purpose-built movie theatre in Los Angeles. Their younger brother Rube Wolf (who dropped the second 'f' in his name) led the orchestra at the theatre. They operated under the company name Fanchon and Marco Stageshows Inc. (with occasional variations). Their productions, termed "Ideas", were performed live before the movie showings, and often featured glamorous showgirls in exotic settings. The productions were "distinguished by their snappy pace, intricate choreography, spectacular costumes, lavish sets, and teams of chorus dancers", and also toured nationally. Unlike other productions, Fanchon and Marco's "Ideas" were designed to be independent of the films shown, allowing them to be performed in many different cities and circumstances. The chorus dancers – up to 48 of whom were on stage at any time – became known as the Fanchonettes. Their main choreographer was Carlos Romero, and they used the services of dress designers Helen Rose and Bonnie Cashin. Among the performers whose careers started in Fanchon and Marco shows were Tyrone Power, Dorothy Lamour, Janet Gaynor, Lupe Velez, Charles Walters, Ann Miller, Eve Arden, Bing Crosby, and Judy Garland. Later productions used various choreographers including Busby Berkeley.

By 1931, Fanchon and Marco produced about fifty hour-long productions each year, and had a staff of six thousand. The pair diversified successfully in the early 1930s, based at the F&M Studios built for them on Sunset Boulevard, and other family members ran some of the enterprises. They operated a costume company, a talent and ballet school (one of whose pupils was Cyd Charisse), a string of theatres in Los Angeles, and nightclubs. They also produced a number of vaudeville acts, and produced radio shows. The company closed its Hollywood office in 1936.

The following year, Fanchon became a producer at Paramount Pictures, and produced the films Turn Off the Moon and Thrill of a Lifetime. At the 1939 World's Fair, she staged and directed the Shipstads and Johnson Ice Follies. She continued to produce the spectacular shows annually, at the Pan-Pacific Auditorium in Los Angeles, supervising not only the ice dancing but all aspects of the presentation. Marco produced the 1944 Academy Awards show, but largely withdrew from show business to concentrate on church activities. Fanchon started to work for 20th Century Fox and produced the musical sequences in films including those by Sonja Henie and Betty Grable. During World War II, she devised the format for small USO shows as entertainment for troops, comprising three female singers and dancers, and a male host who could also provide a speciality act, a format which worked successfully and required little staging. She also produced the 1945 film The All Star Bond Rally. When the Paramount Theatre reopened in 1950, Fanchon and Marco revived stage productions there for a short time.

Fanchon Wolff married restaurateur William H. Simon in 1923. Their adopted daughter became a film actress under the name Faye Marlowe and an author under the name Faye Hueston. Hueston's autobiography, "Fanchon's Daughter," which told the story of her life as the child of the famous show business producer, was published in 2014. Fanchon died in Los Angeles in 1965, at the age of 72. Marco Wolff died in the same city in 1977, aged 83.
