= The Farmer's Daughter (1940 film) =

- Theatrical release poster
- Directed by: James P. Hogan
- Screenplay by: Lewis R. Foster
- Story by: Delmer Daves
- Produced by: William C. Thomas
- Starring: Martha Raye; Charlie Ruggles; Richard Denning; Gertrude Michael; William Frawley; Inez Courtney; William Demarest
- Cinematography: Leo Tover
- Edited by: Archie Marshek
- Production company: Paramount Pictures
- Distributed by: Paramount Pictures
- Release date: March 26, 1940
- Running time: 60 minutes
- Country: United States
- Language: English

The Farmer's Daughter is a 1940 American comedy film directed by James P. Hogan and written by Lewis R. Foster. The film stars Martha Raye, Charlie Ruggles, Richard Denning, Gertrude Michael, William Frawley, Inez Courtney and William Demarest. The film was released on March 26, 1940, by Paramount Pictures.

== Plot ==
Nickie North, a producer, and Scoop Trimble, a press agent, find an investor for their film, who insists that they cast the producer's ex-girlfriend Clarice Sheldon, as the lead. After Sheldon finds out North has a new girlfriend, she leaves, leaving the producer to find a new lead actress.

== Cast ==
- Martha Raye as Patience Bingham
- Charlie Ruggles as Nickie North
- Richard Denning as Dennis Crane
- Gertrude Michael as Clarice Sheldon
- William Frawley as Scoop Trimble
- Inez Courtney as Emily French
- William Demarest as Victor Walsh
- Jack Norton as Shimmy Conway
- William Duncan as Tom Bingham
- Ann Shoemaker as Mrs. Bingham
- Benny Baker as Monk Gordon
- Tom Dugan as Forbes
- Lorraine Krueger as Valerie
- Sheila Ryan as Dorinda
