= Blonde Trouble =

1937 film

- Theatrical release poster
- Directed by: George Archainbaud
- Written by: Lillie Hayward,
- Based on: June Moon by George S. Kaufman and Ring Lardner
- Produced by: Adolph Zukor
- Starring: Eleanore Whitney; Johnny Downs; Lynne Overman
- Cinematography: Henry Sharp
- Edited by: Arthur P. Schmidt
- Music by: Boris Morros
- Production company: Paramount Pictures
- Distributed by: Paramount Pictures
- Release date: August 6, 1937
- Running time: 67 minutes
- Country: United States
- Language: English

Blonde Trouble is a 1937 American musical comedy film directed by George Archainbaud and starring Eleanore Whitney, Johnny Downs and Lynne Overman. Produced and distributed by Paramount Pictures, it is based on the plot of the 1929 musical June Moon by George S. Kaufman and Ring Lardner

== Plot ==
Fred Stevens is an aspiring songwriter from Schenectady who journeys to New York City, hoping to make a name for himself. On the train he meets dental assistant Edna Baker, and the two embark upon a friendship that evolves into her falling for him. While struggling in Tin Pan Alley, Fred falls in with his composer partner's gold-digging sister-in-law Eileen. Eileen really becomes interested when she finds out Fred is carrying his life savings.

== Cast ==
- Eleanore Whitney as Edna Baker
- Johnny Downs as Fred Stevens
- Lynne Overman as Joe Hart
- Terry Walker as Eileen Fletcher
- Benny Baker as Maxie Schwartz
- William Demarest as Paul Sears
- John Patterson as Danny Fox
- El Brendel as Window Washer
- Barlowe Borland as Goebel
- Kitty McHugh as Goldie Foster
- Helen Flint as Lucille Sears
- Harvey Clark as Waiter
- Mabel Colcord as Landlady
- Spec O'Donnell as Fred's Friend

== Songs ==
- "It Was All in Fun", with music by Burton Lane and lyrics by Ralph Freed.

== Reception ==
Cue called the film a "(l)ight, fairly amusing musical". The Christian Century, on the other hand, described the film as "amateurish" and "insipid".

== Bibliography ==
- Hischak, Thomas H. The Oxford Companion to the American Musical: Theatre, Film, and Television. Oxford University Press, 2008.
