= Marguerite Roberts =

American screenwriter (1905–1989)

- Born: September 21, 1905; Clarks, Nebraska, U.S.
- Died: February 17, 1989 (aged 83); Santa Barbara, California, U.S.
- Occupation: Screenwriter
- Years active: 1933–1971

Marguerite Roberts (September 21, 1905 – February 17, 1989) was an American screenwriter, one of the highest paid in the 1930s. After she and her husband John Sanford refused to testify in 1951 before the House Un-American Activities Committee, she was blacklisted for nine years and unable to get work in Hollywood. She was hired again in 1962 by Columbia Pictures.

== Early life ==
Roberts was born in 1905 in Clarks, Nebraska.

In the early 1920s, Roberts and her first husband traveled in the South selling imitation pearls. In California when their business failed, she found work at an El Centro local newspaper, The Imperial Valley Press. She moved to Hollywood and became a secretary for 20th Century Fox in 1926,.

== Career ==
She sold her first script in 1931. In 1933, she collaborated on the screenplay of Sailor's Luck, directed by Raoul Walsh. That year she signed the first of a string of contracts with MGM, which made her one of the best-paid screenwriters of Hollywood at $2500 per week. She explained how she preferred to write scenarios for tough men: "I was weaned on stories about gunfighters and their doings, and I know all the lingo too. My grandfather came West as far as Colorado by covered wagon. He was a sheriff in the state's wildest days."

=== Hiatus ===
Blacklisted in 1951 for refusing to answer the House Un-American Activities Committee, Roberts had to wait nine years before working again in Hollywood. In 1957 she and Sanford moved to Montecito, California.

In 1962, she was hired by Columbia Pictures to work on Diamond Head (1963). She also wrote the screenplay for True Grit (1969), which earned its actor, John Wayne, his only Oscar. She wrote steadily through the next decade and had many of her films produced.

== Personal life ==
Roberts was working for Paramount Pictures in 1936, where she met the writer John Sanford. They married two years later. After Sanford joined the Communist Party in 1939, Roberts followed him but left in 1947. She encouraged him to pursue his independent writing and supported them both by her screenwriting.

== Death ==
She died on February 17, 1989, at 83 years old from arteriosclerosis.

== Filmography ==
- 1933 Sailor's Luck
- 1933 Jimmy and Sally
- 1934 Peck's Bad Boy
- 1935 College Scandal
- 1935 Men Without Names
- 1935 The Last Outpost
- 1936 Rose Bowl
- 1936 Forgotten Faces
- 1936 Florida Special
- 1936 Hollywood Boulevard
- 1937 Wild Money (uncredited)
- 1937 Turn Off the Moon
- 1938 Meet the Girls
- 1939 They Shall Have Music (uncredited)
- 1940 Escape
- 1941 Ziegfeld Girl
- 1941 Honky Tonk
- 1942 Somewhere I'll Find You
- 1944 Dragon Seed
- 1946 Undercurrent (uncredited)
- 1947 Desire Me
- 1947 The Sea of Grass
- 1948 If Winter Comes
- 1949 The Bribe
- 1950 Ambush
- 1951 Soldiers Three
- 1952 Ivanhoe (credit restored)
- 1953 The Girl Who Had Everything (uncredited)
- 1962 The Main Attraction (uncredited)
- 1962 Diamond Head
- 1963 Rampage
- 1965 Love Has Many Faces
- 1968 5 Card Stud
- 1969 True Grit
- 1970 Norwood
- 1971 Red Sky at Morning
- 1971 Shoot Out
