= Eleanore Whitney =

American actress

- Eleanore Whitney
- Born: March 12, 1917; Cleveland
- Died: November 1, 1983 (aged 66); New York City
- Other names: Eleanore Backer (married name)
- Occupations: Actress, dancer
- Years active: 1935–1939
- Spouse: Frederick Backer
- Children: 1

See also Eleanor Bull (maiden name Eleanor Whitney)

Eleanore Whitney (April 12, 1917 – November 1, 1983), later Eleanore Backer, was an American film actress and tap dancer. She was born on April 12, 1917, in Cleveland, Ohio. A meeting with Bill Robinson provided and opportunity for her to perform as a dancer. That led to her touring with Rae Samuels in vaudeville, after which she made personal appearances with Jack Benny and performed in vaudeville with Rudy Valee.

Whitney was married in 1939 to attorney Frederick Backer. She moved to New York with her husband and did not return to acting. He became a judge at New York Supreme Court.

== Filmography ==
Whitney's filmography, believed to be complete, includes:

- Oh, Evaline! (1935, Short) as Herself
- The Big Broadcast of 1936 (1935) as Herself
- Millions in the Air (1935) as Bubbles
- Screen Snapshots Series 16, No. 1 (1936, documentary short) as Herself
- Timothy's Quest (1936) as Martha
- Three Cheers for Love (1936) as Skippy Dormant
- Hollywood Boulevard (1936) as Herself
- The Big Broadcast of 1937 (1936) as Dance Specialty
- Rose Bowl (1936) as Cheers Reynolds
- College Holiday (1936) as Herself
- Clarence (1937) as Cora Wheeler
- Turn Off the Moon (1937) as Caroline Wilson
- Blonde Trouble (1937) as Edna Baker
- Thrill of a Lifetime (1937) as Betty Jane
- Campus Confessions (1938) as Susie Quinn (final film role)
