= Artists and Models (1937 film) =

1937 film by Raoul Walsh

- Paramount Pictures publicity still for Artists and Models (1937)
- Directed by: Raoul Walsh; John E. Burch (assistant)
- Written by: Walter DeLeon; Francis Martin; Sig Herzig (short); Gene Thackery(short); Keene Thompson
- Produced by: Lewis E. Gensler
- Starring: Jack Benny; Ida Lupino; Richard Arlen
- Cinematography: Victor Milner
- Edited by: Ellsworth Hoagland
- Music by: Yacht Club Boys; Ted Koehler; Burton Lane (music); Frederick Hollander (music); Leo Robin (lyrics); Harold Arlen (music); Jean Schwartz (music); Jules Loman (lyrics); Victor Young (music); Ralph Rainger (music)
- Distributed by: Paramount Pictures
- Release date: August 4, 1937
- Running time: 97 minutes
- Country: United States
- Language: English
- Budget: $1 million

Artists and Models is a 1937 black-and-white American musical comedy film, directed by Raoul Walsh and starring Jack Benny and Ida Lupino. It was produced by Lewis E. Gensler.

In 1937, the film received an Oscar nomination at the Academy of Motion Picture Arts and Sciences for Best Song: Whispers in the Dark, sung by Connee Boswell with Andre Kostelanetz and His Orchestra.

== Cast ==
- Jack Benny as Mac Brewster
- Ida Lupino as Paula Sewell/Monterey
- Richard Arlen as Alan Townsend
- Gail Patrick as Cynthia Wentworth
- Ben Blue as Jupiter Pluvius
- Judy Canova as Toots
- Cecil Cunningham as Stella
- Donald Meek as Dr. Zimmer
- Hedda Hopper as Mrs. Townsend

Guest Stars (as themselves)

- Peter Arno
- Rube Goldberg
- Louis Armstrong
- Connee Boswell
- The Canova Family
- Andre Kostelanetz
- Martha Raye
- Yacht Club Boys

Additionally, actress and Ziegfeld Follies member Dorothy McHugh had an uncredited role in the film; she would later go on to be the first actor to read the famous line "I've fallen and I can't get up" for LifeAlert.

== Songs ==
- "Whispers in the Dark"
  - by Friedrich Hollaender and Leo Robin
  - Sung by Connie Boswell
- "Mister Esquire"
  - Lyrics by Ted Koehler
  - Music by Victor Young
- "I Have Eyes"
  - Lyrics by Leo Robin
  - Music by Ralph Rainger
- "Pop Goes the Bubble"
  - Lyrics by Ted Koehler
  - Music by Burton Lane
- "Public Melody No. 1"
  - Lyrics by Ted Koehler
  - Music by Harold Arlen
  - Sung by Martha Raye and Louis Armstrong (staged by Vincente Minnelli, his first assignment in Hollywood)
- "Stop You're Breaking My Heart"
  - Lyrics by Ted Koehler
  - Music by Burton Lane
- "Moonlight and Shadows"
  - Music by Friedrich Hollaender
  - Lyrics by Leo Robin

== Critical reception ==
Frank S. Nugent of the The New York Times gave a positive review and wrote, "Paramount's Artists and Models proves to be a suave, witty and polished show, one of the sprightliest of the season's musical comedies. A deal of humor has gone into the script, Raoul Walsh has paced it smoothly, and an engaging cast has given it buoyance and zest." Nugent enjoyed the "racy" dialogue and described Jack Benny as "still the drollest comic onscreen", and declared that this is "his best performance to date."

Variety described the film as a "madcap musical" and wrote that "Jack Benny, Ida Lupino, Richard Arlen and Gail Patrick are chiefly responsible for holding the film together." It also noted that it marked the first film to feature Benny as the romantic lead.

Harrison's Reports also gave a positive review and wrote, "Most of the credit for its entertaining quality must go to Jack Benny, for, despite the picture's lavishness, it is his good-natured clowning that provokes the laughs ... Aside from this, the handsome sets are eye-filling, the music is tuneful, and the romance pleasant.
