= The Quarterback (1940 film) =

- Theatrical release poster
- Directed by: H. Bruce Humberstone
- Screenplay by: Robert Pirosh
- Produced by: Anthony Veiller
- Starring: Wayne Morris; Virginia Dale; Lillian Cornell; Edgar Kennedy; Alan Mowbray; Jerome Cowan
- Cinematography: Leo Tover
- Edited by: Alma Macrorie
- Music by: John Leipold
- Production company: Paramount Pictures
- Distributed by: Paramount Pictures
- Release date: October 16, 1940
- Running time: 74 minutes
- Country: United States
- Language: English

The Quarterback is a 1940 American comedy film directed by H. Bruce Humberstone and written by Robert Pirosh. The film stars Wayne Morris, Virginia Dale, Lillian Cornell, Edgar Kennedy, Alan Mowbray and Jerome Cowan. The film was released on October 16, 1940, by Paramount Pictures.

== Plot ==
College student Jimmy Jones is a timid guy, whereas his twin brother Bill is a fun-loving sort who is in debt with gamblers. When it turns out Bill has an aptitude for football, he pretends to be Jimmy and joins the school's team.

Both brothers end up falling for co-ed Kay Merrill, who is offended by Jimmy's aggressive behavior, not realizing it was really Bill. A gangster, Townley, wants the big game to be lost on purpose so he can collect his gambling debts. Jimmy plays in it himself and does poorly while Bill hitchhikes out of town. But when he hears what's happening on the radio, Bill returns, wins the game, then fights off the crooks.

== Cast ==
- Wayne Morris as Jimmy Jones and Billy Jones
- Virginia Dale as Kay Merrill
- Lillian Cornell as Sheila
- Edgar Kennedy as Pops
- Alan Mowbray as Professor Hobbs
- Jerome Cowan as Townley
- Rod Cameron as Tex
- William Frawley as Coach
- Walter Catlett as Tom
- Frankie Burke as 'Slats' Finney

== See also ==
- List of American football films
