= Timothy's Quest (1936 film) =

1936 film by Charles Barton

- Directed by: Charles Barton
- Screenplay by: Virginia Van Upp; Dore Schary; Gilbert Pratt
- Produced by: Harold Hurley
- Starring: Eleanore Whitney; Tom Keene; Dickie Moore; Virginia Weidler; Elizabeth Patterson; Sally Martin; Benny Bartlett
- Cinematography: Harry Fischbeck
- Edited by: Jack Dennis
- Production company: Paramount Pictures
- Distributed by: Paramount Pictures
- Release date: January 31, 1936
- Running time: 65 minutes
- Country: United States
- Language: English

Timothy's Quest is a 1936 American comedy film directed by Charles Barton and written by Virginia Van Upp, Dore Schary and Gilbert Pratt, based on a novel by Kate Douglas Wiggin.

The film stars Eleanore Whitney, Tom Keene, Dickie Moore, Virginia Weidler, Elizabeth Patterson, Sally Martin and Benny Bartlett. The film was released on January 31, 1936, by Paramount Pictures.

== Plot ==
Timothy and his sister run away from an orphanage because of the poor treatment they experienced there. They end up together on a farm, where the owner puts Timothy through a series of arduous chores to earn his keep.

== Cast ==
- Eleanore Whitney as Martha
- Tom Keene as David Masters
- Dickie Moore as Timothy
- Virginia Weidler as Samantha Tarbox
- Elizabeth Patterson as Vilda Cummins
- Sally Martin as Gay
- Benny Bartlett as Jimmy
- Samuel S. Hinds as Rev. Fellows
- Esther Dale as Hitty Tarbox
- J. M. Kerrigan as Doctor Cudd
- Irene Franklin as Flossie Cudd
- Jack Clifford as Ed
- John Kelly as Herb
- Raymond Hatton as Jabe Doolittle
