= The Busy Body (film) =

1967 film by William Castle

- film poster by Frank Frazetta
- Directed by: William Castle
- Screenplay by: Ben Starr
- Based on: novel by Donald E. Westlake
- Produced by: William Castle
- Starring: Sid Caesar; Robert Ryan; Anne Baxter; Kay Medford; Jan Murray; Richard Pryor; Arlene Golonka; Ben Blue; Dom DeLuise; Bill Dana; Godfrey Cambridge; Marty Ingels; George Jessel
- Cinematography: Harold E. Stine
- Edited by: Edwin H. Bryant
- Music by: Vic Mizzy
- Distributed by: Paramount Pictures
- Release date: March 12, 1967
- Running time: 101 minutes
- Language: English

The Busy Body is a 1967 American comedy film directed and produced by William Castle and based on Donald E. Westlake's novel. It is Richard Pryor's film debut.

== Plot ==
George Norton is a low-level bumbler who works for Chicago crime boss Charley Barker. A well-dressed mama's boy, George is in good standing with Barker, gaining a promotion, until an incident that costs the mob a million dollars.

George is indirectly responsible when Archie, a mob courier, is killed at a barbecue. After the funeral, Barker instructs George to dig up Archie's body because $500,000 was stuffed inside the lining of each side of a blue suit that an unwitting George personally chose for the burial.

George opens the casket to find it empty, and soon occupied by a different corpse. He sets out to retrieve the body and the money before Barker gets angry enough to arrange a funeral for him.

== Cast ==
- Sid Caesar as George
- Robert Ryan as Charley
- Anne Baxter as Margo
- Kay Medford as Ma Norton
- Jan Murray as Murray
- Richard Pryor as Lt. Whitaker
- Dom DeLuise as Kurt
- Godfrey Cambridge as Mike
- Bill Dana as Archie
- Arlene Golonka as Bobbi
- Charles McGraw as Fred Harwell
- Ben Blue as Felix Rose
- Marty Ingels as Willie
- George Jessel as Mr. Fessel
- Paul Wexler as Mr. Merriwether
- Don Brodie as Board Member

== See also ==
- List of American films of 1967
