= William Frawley =

American actor (1887–1966)

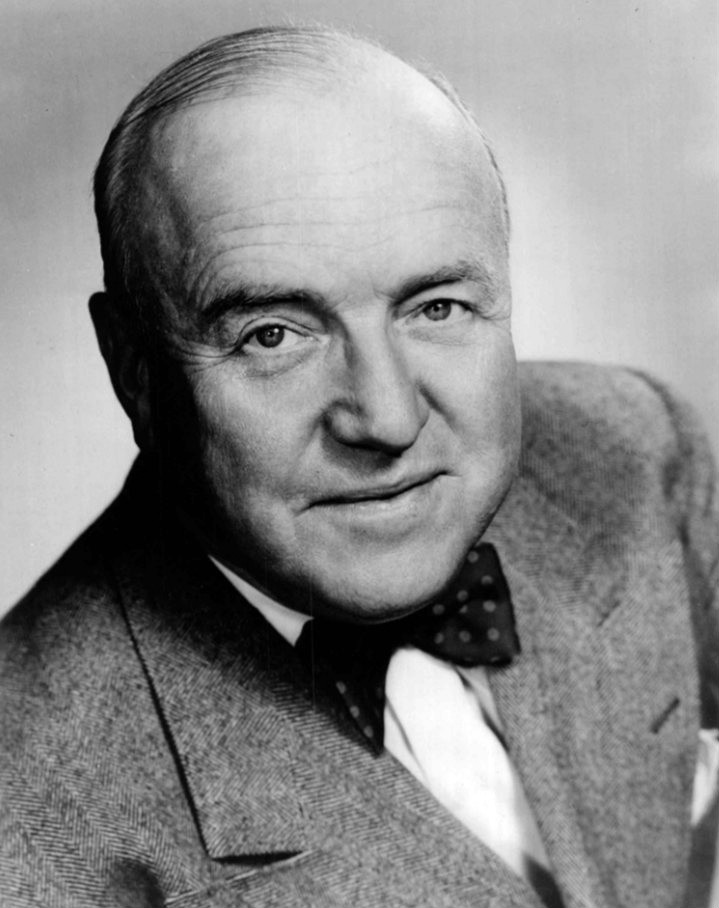
- Frawley in 1951
- Born: William Clement Frawley; February 26, 1887; Burlington, Iowa, U.S.
- Died: March 3, 1966 (aged 79); Los Angeles, California, U.S.
- Resting place: San Fernando Mission Cemetery
- Other name: Bill Frawley
- Occupation: Actor
- Years active: 1914–1965
- Spouse: Edna Louise Broedt (m. 1914; div. 1927)

William Clement Frawley (February 26, 1887 – March 3, 1966) was an American vaudevillian and actor best known for playing landlord Fred Mertz in the sitcom I Love Lucy. Frawley also played "Bub" O'Casey during the first five seasons of the sitcom My Three Sons and the political advisor to the Hon. Henry X. Harper (Gene Lockhart) in the film Miracle on 34th Street.

Frawley began his career in vaudeville in 1914 with his wife, Edna Louise Broedt. Their comedy act, "Frawley and Louise", continued until their divorce in 1927. He performed on Broadway multiple times. In 1916, he signed with Paramount Studios and appeared in more than 100 films over the next 35 years.

== Early life ==
Frawley was born in Burlington, Iowa, the second son in a family of four children to Michael A. Frawley (1857–1907) and Mary E. (Brady) Frawley (1859–1921). He attended Catholic schools and sang in the choir at St. Paul's Catholic Church. As he got older, he played small roles in local theater productions at the Burlington Opera House, and performed in amateur shows, though his mother, a highly religious woman, discouraged such activities.

Frawley's first job was as a stenographer in an office of the Union Pacific Railroad in Omaha, Nebraska. Two years later, he moved to Chicago, where he found work as a court reporter, and against his mother's wishes, got a singing part in a musical comedy, The Flirting Princess. To appease his mother, he relocated to St. Louis, Missouri, to work for another railroad company.

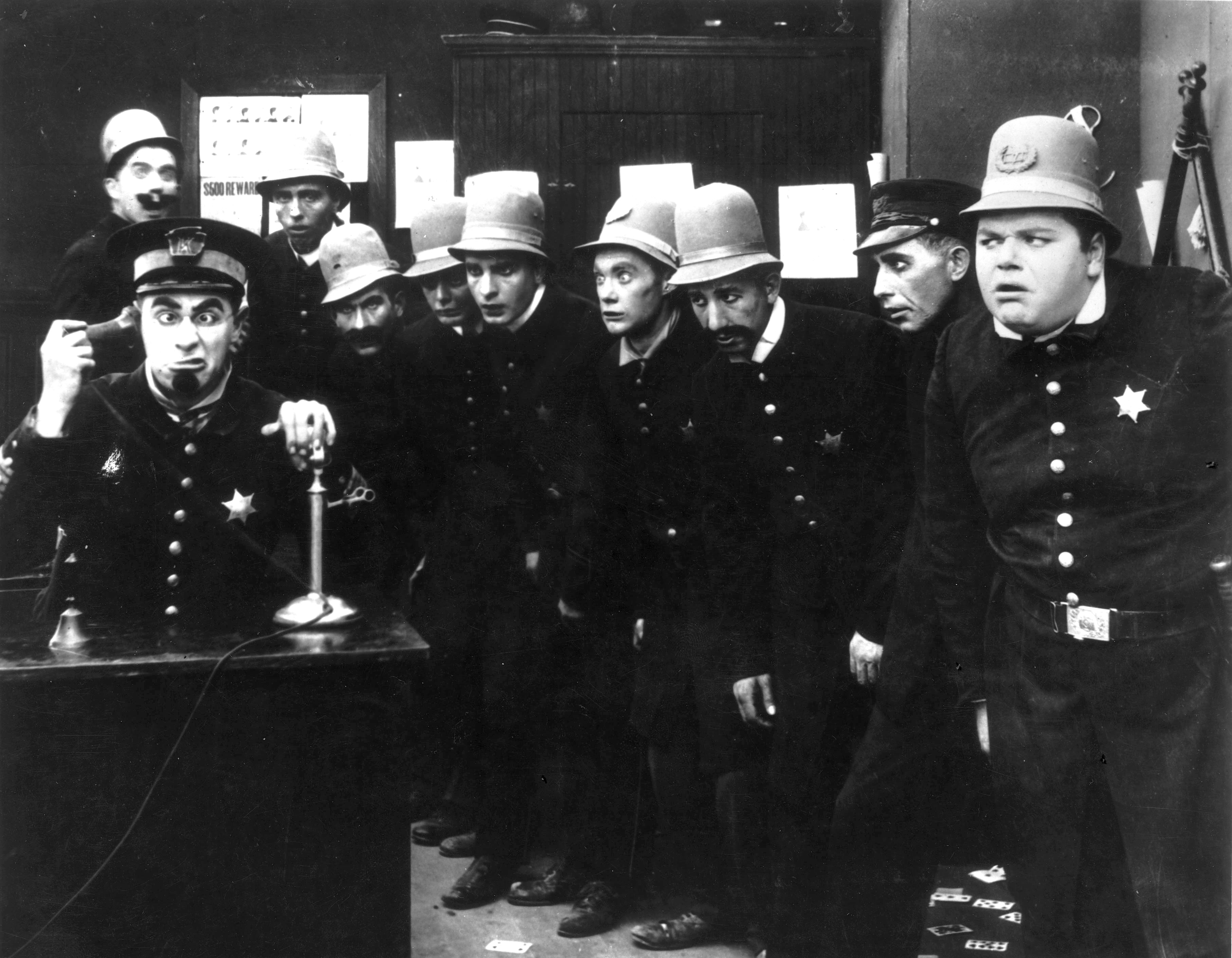
Left: Ford Sterling as Keystone Cops police chief (seated); in the background just to the right of the Keystone Cops actor above Sterling is Frawley in "In the Clutches of the Gang" (1914)

Unfulfilled in his job, he dreamed of becoming a professional entertainer. He formed a vaudeville act with his brother Paul (1889–1973), but six months later, their mother told Paul to return to Iowa. Meanwhile, William wrote a script titled Fun in a Vaudeville Agency, and sold it for over $500.

After his initial success as a scriptwriter, Frawley decided to move to the West, settling in Denver, where he was hired as a singer at a café and teamed with pianist Franz Rath. The duo soon moved to San Francisco with their act, "A Man, a Piano, and a Nut". During his vaudeville career, Frawley introduced and helped popularize the songs "My Mammy", "My Melancholy Baby", and "Carolina in the Morning". Many years later, in 1958, he recorded a selection of his old stage songs on an LP, Bill Frawley Sings the Old Ones.

== Early career ==
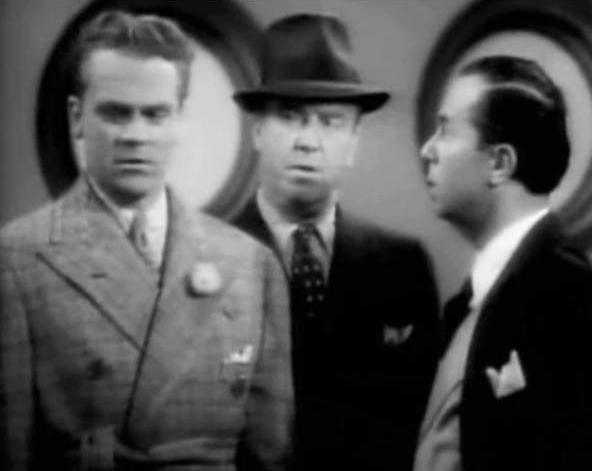
With James Cagney in Something to Sing About

Frawley began performing in Broadway theater. His first such show was the musical comedy, Merry, Merry in 1925. Frawley had his first dramatic role in 1932, playing press agent Owen O'Malley in the original production of Ben Hecht and Charles MacArthur's Twentieth Century. He continued to be a dramatic actor at various venues until 1933.

In 1916, Frawley appeared in two short subject silent films. He subsequently performed in three more, but did not decide to develop a cinematic career until 1933, when he appeared in some short comedy films and the feature musical Moonlight and Pretzels (Universal Studios, 1933). Frawley moved to Los Angeles, where he signed a seven-year contract with Paramount Pictures.

Finding much work as a character actor, Frawley had roles in comedies, dramas, musicals, Westerns, and romances. He appeared in Miracle on 34th Street (1947) as Judge Harper's (Gene Lockhart) political adviser, who warns his client in great detail of the dire political consequences if he rules that there is no Santa Claus. Some of Frawley's other memorable film roles were as the baseball manager in Joe E. Brown's Alibi Ike (1935), the wedding host in Charlie Chaplin's Monsieur Verdoux (1947), and a hard-nosed insurance investigator in My Home in San Antone with Roy Acuff and Lloyd Corrigan. He appeared in two movies starring James Cagney, Something to Sing About and Kiss Tomorrow Goodbye.

== Television ==
=== I Love Lucy ===
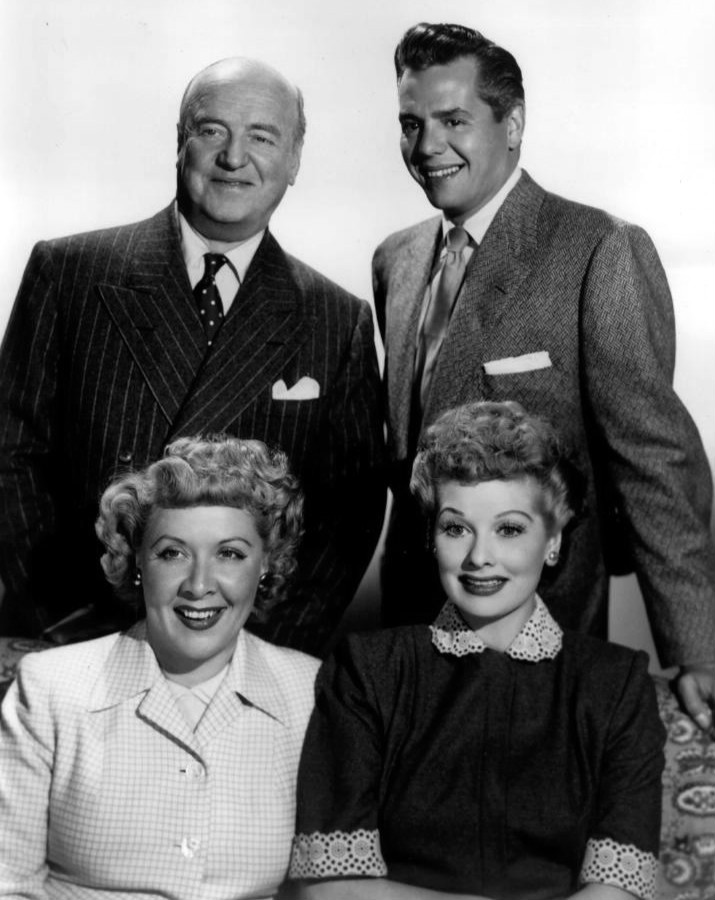
I Love Lucy cast (clockwise): William Frawley, Desi Arnaz, Lucille Ball, Vivian Vance

By 1951, the 64-year-old Frawley had appeared in over 100 movies, but was starting to find film offers becoming fewer. When he heard that Desi Arnaz and Lucille Ball were casting a new television situation comedy, he applied eagerly to play the role of the cantankerous, miserly landlord Fred Mertz. One evening, he telephoned Lucille Ball, asking her what his chances were. Both Ball and Arnaz were excited about including Frawley, a motion-picture veteran, in the cast; less enthusiastic were CBS executives, who were wary of Frawley's well-known frequent drinking and instability. Arnaz (himself a heavy drinker) warned Frawley about the network's concerns, telling him that if he was late to work, arrived drunk, or was unable to perform because of something other than legitimate illness more than once, he would be written out of the show. In one version of this conversation, Arnaz told Frawley he would get three chances. The first mistake would be tolerated, the second would result in a severe reprimand, and the third would result in his being fired. Contrary to the network's concerns, Frawley never arrived at work drunk, and mastered his lines after only one reading. Arnaz eventually became one of Frawley's few close friends.

Before each episode, Frawley would read the script with the rest of the cast, then would take out the sheets with only his lines and discard the rest of the script to study only his part.

I Love Lucy debuted October 15, 1951, on CBS, and was a huge success. The series was broadcast for six years as half-hour episodes, later changing to hour-long specials from 1957 to 1960 titled The Lucille Ball-Desi Arnaz Show (later retitled The Lucy-Desi Comedy Hour).

Vivian Vance played Ethel Mertz, Frawley's on-screen wife. Although the two actors worked well together, they greatly disliked each other offscreen. Most attribute their mutual hatred to Vance's vocal resentment of having to play wife to a man 22 years her senior. Frawley reportedly overheard Vance complaining; he took offense and never forgave her. "She's one of the finest girls to come out of Kansas", he once said, "But I often wish she'd go back there."

An avid New York Yankees fan, Frawley had it written into his I Love Lucy contract that he did not have to work during the World Series if the Yankees were playing. The Yankees were in every World Series during that time except for 1954 and 1959. He did not appear in two episodes of the show as a result.

For his work on the show, Frawley was Emmy-nominated five consecutive times (1953–1957) for Outstanding Supporting Actor in a Comedy Series. In 1957, at the end of I Love Lucy, Ball and Arnaz gave Frawley and Vance the opportunity to have their own Fred and Ethel spin-off series for Desilu Studios. Despite his animosity towards Vance, Frawley saw a lucrative opportunity and accepted. Vance declined, having no desire to work with Frawley again and also feeling that Ethel and Fred would be unsuccessful without the Ricardos.

=== My Three Sons ===
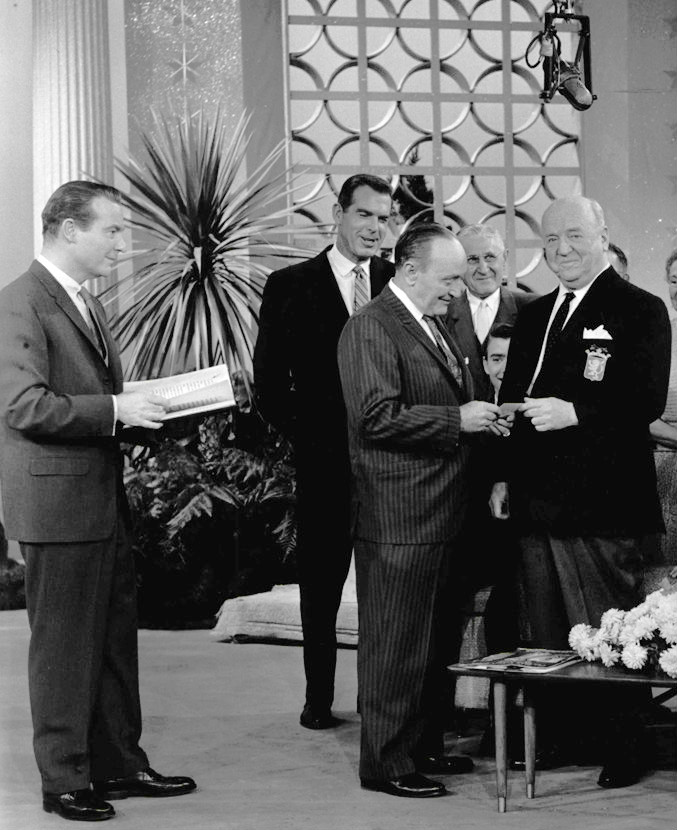
While appearing on My Three Sons, Frawley was the subject of This Is Your Life in January 1961. He received a lifetime baseball pass from the Angels' Fred Haney. Fred MacMurray also was part of the show.

Frawley next joined the cast of the ABC (later CBS) situation comedy My Three Sons, playing live-in grandfather and housekeeper Michael Francis "Bub" O'Casey beginning in 1960. Featuring Fred MacMurray, the series was about a widower raising his three sons.

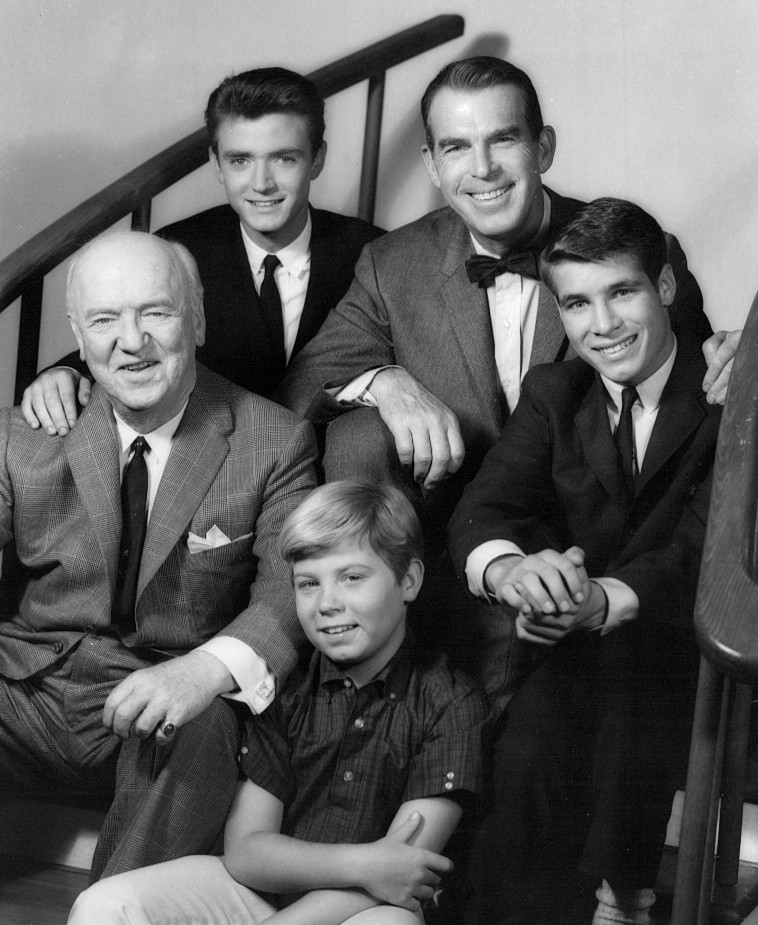
Clockwise from left: William Frawley, Tim Considine, Fred MacMurray, Don Grady, and Stanley Livingston on My Three Sons (1962)

Frawley reportedly never felt comfortable with the out-of-sequence filming method used for My Three Sons after doing I Love Lucy in sequence for years. Each season was arranged so that main actor Fred MacMurray could film all of his scenes during two separate intensive blocks of filming for a total of 65 working days on the set; Frawley and the other actors worked around the absent MacMurray for the remainder of the year's production schedule.

== Personal life ==
In 1914, Frawley married fellow vaudevillian Edna Louise Broedt. They developed an act, "Frawley and Louise", which they performed all across the country. Their act was described as "light comedy, with singing, dancing, and patter." The couple separated in 1921 (later divorcing in 1927). They had no children. His brother Paul Frawley (1889–1973) also was an actor on Broadway with relatively few appearances in motion pictures.

Frawley had a reputation for being cantankerous and difficult, likely exacerbated by a drinking problem. In 1928, he was fired from the Broadway show That's My Baby for punching actor Clifton Webb in the nose.

== Final years and death ==
Frawley made two television appearances the year before his death. His appearance on the panel show I've Got a Secret on May 3, 1965, consisted of contestants guessing Frawley's "secret", which was that he was the first performer ever to sing "My Melancholy Baby", in 1912. He had performed that song previously on television, as Fred Mertz, in the 1958 episode "Lucy Goes to Sun Valley" on the Lucy-Desi Comedy Hour.

Frawley's final on-camera performance was on October 25, 1965, with a brief cameo appearance in Lucille Ball's second television sitcom, The Lucy Show, in the episode "Lucy and the Countess Have a Horse Guest". Frawley plays a horse trainer and Lucy comments: "You know, he reminds me of someone I used to know." (Vivian Vance, who by then had left The Lucy Show except for an occasional guest appearance, does not appear in the episode. In the closing credits of the episode, he was given a unique one at the request of Ball, saying; "And Our Own Bill Frawley")

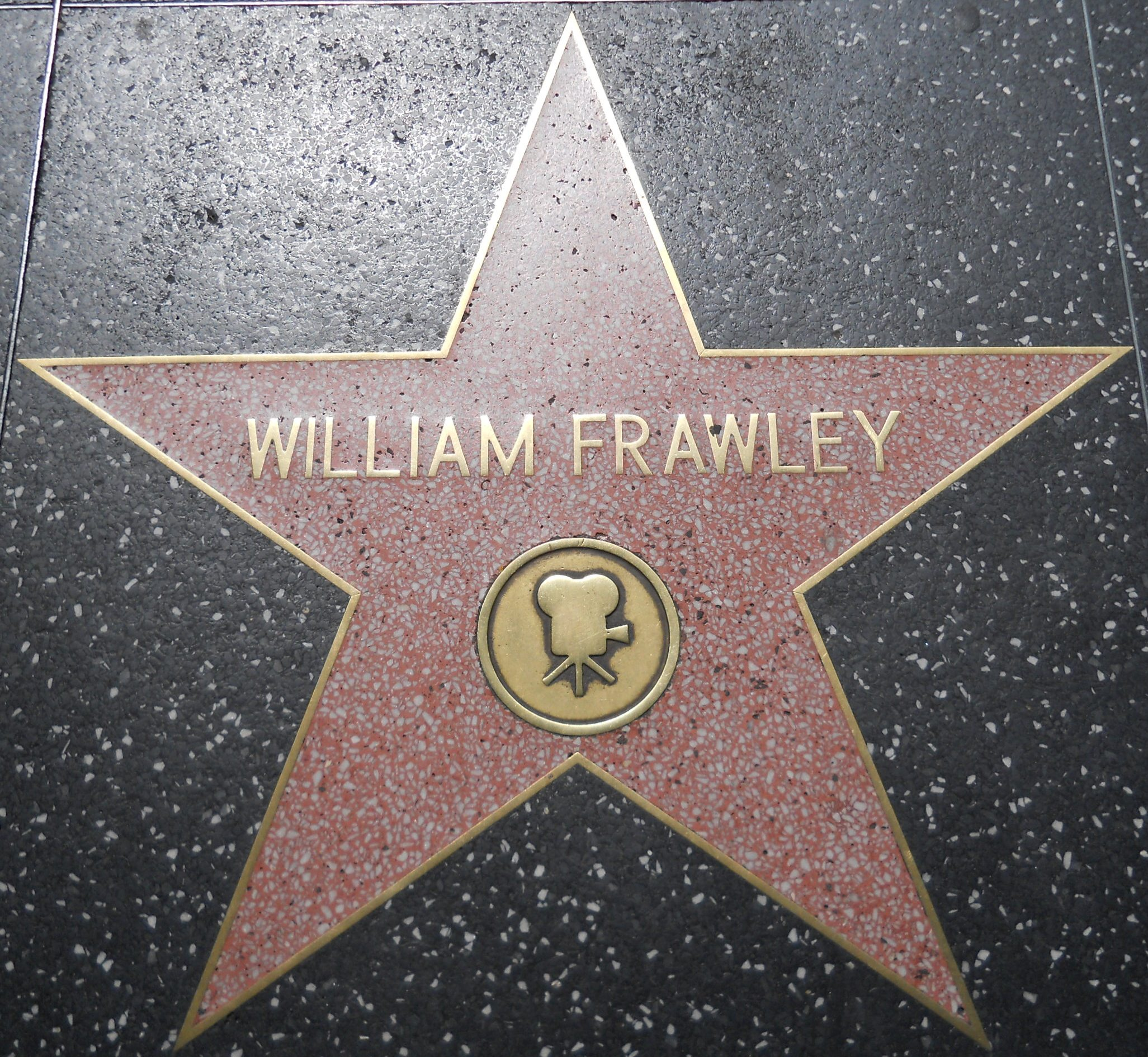
Star on the Hollywood Walk of Fame at 6322 Hollywood Blvd.

Frawley suffered a fatal heart attack while walking on Hollywood Boulevard and died on March 3, 1966. Upon learning of his death, Desi Arnaz immediately took out a full-page ad in all the trade papers, with the words: "Buenas noches, amigo." Arnaz, Fred MacMurray, and My Three Sons executive producer Don Fedderson were pallbearers at his funeral. Lucille Ball said: "I've lost one of my dearest friends and show business has lost one of the greatest character actors of all time. Those of us who knew him and loved him will miss him."

=== Legacy ===
William Frawley is buried in the San Fernando Mission Cemetery in Mission Hills, Los Angeles. For his achievements in the field of motion pictures, he was awarded a star on the Hollywood Walk of Fame, at 6322 Hollywood Blvd, on February 8, 1960. He is memorialized, as well, in the Lucille Ball-Desi Arnaz Center in Jamestown, New York, which also contains his "Hippity-Hoppity" (frog) costume from an episode of I Love Lucy. Both Frawley and Vivian Vance were inducted into the Television Academy Hall of Fame in March 2012.

The story of how Desi Arnaz hired Frawley to play Fred Mertz in I Love Lucy is told in I Love Lucy: A Funny Thing Happened on the Way to the Sitcom, a stage comedy that had its world premiere in Los Angeles on July 12, 2018. The play, from Gregg Oppenheimer (son of I Love Lucy creator-producer-head writer Jess Oppenheimer), was recorded in front of a live audience for nationwide public radio broadcast and online distribution, and starred Sarah Drew as Lucille Ball and Oscar Nunez as Desi Arnaz. BBC Radio 4 broadcast a serialized version of the play in the UK in August 2020, as Lucy Loves Desi: A Funny Thing Happened on the Way to the Sitcom, in which Stacy Keach portrayed Frawley, Anne Heche played Lucille Ball, and Wilmer Valderrama played Desi Arnaz.

Frawley was portrayed by John Wheeler in the television movie Lucy & Desi: Before the Laughter. Thirty years later he was portrayed in the 2021 film Being the Ricardos by J. K. Simmons, who received an Academy Award nomination for his role.

== Filmography ==
- Lord Loveland Discovers America (1916) as Tony Kidd
- Persistent Percival (1916, Short) as Billy
- Should Husbands Be Watched? (1925, Short) as Beat Cop
- Ventriloquist (1927, short subject listed in BFI Database) as 'Hoak' salesman
- Turkey for Two (1929, Short) as Convict
- Fancy That (1929, Short) as Percy
- Moonlight and Pretzels (1933) as Mac
- Hell and High Water (1933) as Milton J. Bunsey
- Miss Fane's Baby Is Stolen (1934) as Captain Murphy
- Bolero (1934) as Mike DeBaere
- The Crime Doctor (1934) as Fraser
- The Witching Hour (1934) as Jury foreman
- Shoot the Works (1934) as Larry Hale
- The Lemon Drop Kid (1934) as William Dunhill
- Here Is My Heart (1934) as James Smith
- Car 99 (1935) as Sergeant Barrel
- Hold 'Em Yale (1935) as Sunshine Joe
- Alibi Ike (1935) as Cap
- College Scandal (1935) as Chief of Police Magoun
- Welcome Home (1935) as Painless
- Harmony Lane (1935) as Edwin P. 'Ed' Christy
- It's a Great Life (1935) as Lt. McNulty
- Ship Cafe (1935) as Briney O'Brien
- Strike Me Pink (1936) as Mr. Copple
- Desire (1936) as Mr. Gibson
- F-Man (1936) as Detective Rogan
- The Princess Comes Across (1936) as Benton
- Three Cheers for Love (1936) as Milton Shakespeare
- The General Died at Dawn (1936) as Brighton
- Three Married Men (1936) as Bill Mullins
- Rose Bowl (1936) as Soapy Moreland
- High, Wide and Handsome (1937) as Mac
- Double or Nothing (1937) as John Pederson
- Something to Sing About (1937) as Hank Meyers
- Blossoms on Broadway (1937) as Frances X. Rush
- Mad About Music (1938) as Dusty Turner
- Professor Beware (1938) as Snoop Donlan
- Sons of the Legion (1938) as Uncle Willie Lee
- Touchdown, Army (1938) as Jack Heffernan
- Ambush (1939) as Inspector J.L. Weber
- St. Louis Blues (1939) as Maj. Martingale
- Persons in Hiding (1939) as Alec Inglis
- The Adventures of Huckleberry Finn (1939) as The 'Duke'
- Rose of Washington Square (1939) as Harry Long
- Ex-Champ (1939) as Mushy Harrington
- Grand Jury Secrets (1939) as Bright Eyes
- Night Work (1939) as Bruiser Brown
- Stop, Look and Love (1939) as Joe Haller
- The Farmer's Daughter (1940) as Scoop Trimble
- Opened by Mistake (1940) as Matt Kingsley
- Those Were the Days! (1940) as Prisoner (uncredited)
- Untamed (1940) as Les Woodbury
- Golden Gloves (1940) as Emory Balzar
- Rhythm on the River (1940) as Mr. Westlake
- The Quarterback (1940) as Coach
- One Night in the Tropics (1940) as Roscoe
- Dancing on a Dime (1940) as Mac
- Sandy Gets Her Man (1940) as Police Chief J. A. O'Hara
- Six Lessons from Madame La Zonga (1941) as Chauncey Beheegan
- Footsteps in the Dark (1941) as Hopkins
- Blondie in Society (1941) as Waldo Pincus
- The Bride Came C.O.D. (1941) as Sheriff McGee
- Cracked Nuts (1941) as James Mitchell
- Public Enemies (1941) as Bang
- Treat 'Em Rough (1942) as 'Hotfoot'
- Roxie Hart (1942) as O'Malley
- It Happened in Flatbush (1942) as Sam Sloan
- Give Out, Sisters (1942) as Harrison
- Wildcat (1942) as Oliver Westbrook
- Moonlight in Havana (1942) as Barney Crane
- Gentleman Jim (1942) as Billy Delaney
- We've Never Been Licked (1943) as Traveling Salesman
- Larceny with Music (1943) as Mike Simms
- Whistling in Brooklyn (1943) as Detective Ramsey
- The Fighting Seabees (1944) as Eddie Powers
- Going My Way (1944) as Max Dolan – the Publisher (uncredited)
- Minstrel Man (1944)
- Lake Placid Serenade (1944) as Jiggers
- Flame of Barbary Coast (1945) as 'Smooth' Wylie
- Hitchhike to Happiness (1945) as Sandy Hill
- Lady on a Train (1945) as Police Sergeant Christie
- Ziegfeld Follies (1946) as Martin ('A Sweepstakes Ticket')
- The Virginian (1946) as Honey Wiggen
- Rendezvous with Annie (1946) as Gen. Trent
- The Inner Circle (1946) as Det. Lt. Webb
- Crime Doctor's Man Hunt (1946) as Inspector Harry B. Manning
- Hit Parade of 1947 (1947) as Harry Holmes
- Monsieur Verdoux (1947) as Jean La Salle
- Miracle on 34th Street (1947) as Charlie Halloran
- I Wonder Who's Kissing Her Now (1947) as Jim Mason
- Mother Wore Tights (1947) as Mr. Schneider
- Down to Earth (1947) as Police Lieutenant
- Blondie's Anniversary (1947) as Sharkey, the Loan Shark
- My Wild Irish Rose (1947) as William Scanlon
- Texas, Brooklyn & Heaven (1948) as Agent
- The Babe Ruth Story (1948) as Jack Dunn
- Good Sam (1948) as Tom Moore
- Joe Palooka in Winner Take All (1948) as Knobby Walsh
- The Girl from Manhattan (1948) as Mr. Bernouti
- Chicken Every Sunday (1949) as George Kirby
- The Lone Wolf and His Lady (1949) as Inspector J.D. Crane
- Home in San Antone (1949) as O'Fleery
- Red Light (1949) as Hotel Clerk
- The Lady Takes a Sailor (1949) as Oliver Harker
- East Side, West Side (1949) as Bill the Bartender
- Blondie's Hero (1950) as Marty Greer
- Kill the Umpire (1950) as Jimmy O'Brien
- Kiss Tomorrow Goodbye (1950) as Byers
- Pretty Baby (1950) as Corcoran
- Abbott and Costello Meet the Invisible Man (1951) as Detective Roberts
- The Lemon Drop Kid (1951) as Gloomy Willie
- Rhubarb (1951) as Len Sickles
- Rancho Notorious (1952) as Baldy Gunder
- I Love Lucy (1953, unreleased feature) as Fred Mertz / Himself
- The Dirty Look (1954, Short)
- Better Football (1954, Short) as Himself
- Safe at Home! (1962) as Bill Turner

== Selected television (actor) ==
- I Love Lucy (1951–1957)
- The Lucille Ball-Desi Arnaz Show (1957–1960)
- The Ford Show, Starring Tennessee Ernie Ford
  (December 5, 1957)
- My Three Sons (1960–1965)
- The Lucy Show (1965 cameo, one episode)

== Broadway credits ==
- Merry, Merry (1925–1926)
- Bye, Bye, Bonnie (1927)
- She's My Baby (1928)
- Here's Howe (1928)
- Sons O' Guns (1929–1930)
- She Lived Next to the Firehouse (1931)
- Tell Her the Truth (1932)
- Twentieth Century (1932–1933)
- The Ghost Writer (1933)

== Discography ==
=== Albums ===
- Bill Frawley Sings the Old Ones (1958) Dot DLP-3061
