= Cocoanut Grove (film) =

1938 film by Alfred Santell

- Theatrical release poster
- Directed by: Alfred Santell
- Screenplay by: Sy Bartlett; Olive Cooper
- Produced by: George M. Arthur
- Starring: Fred MacMurray; Harriet Hilliard; Ben Blue; Eve Arden; Rufe Davis; Billy Lee; George Walcott
- Cinematography: Leo Tover
- Edited by: Hugh Bennett
- Music by: John Leipold; Leo Shuken
- Production company: Paramount Pictures
- Distributed by: Paramount Pictures
- Release date: May 20, 1938
- Running time: 85 minutes
- Country: United States
- Language: English

Cocoanut Grove is a 1938 American comedy film directed by Alfred Santell, and written by Sy Bartlett and Olive Cooper. The film stars Fred MacMurray, Harriet Hilliard, Ben Blue, Eve Arden, Rufe Davis, Billy Lee and George Walcott. Paramount Pictures released it on May 20, 1938.

== Plot ==
Johnny Prentice, a bandleader in Chicago with a bad temper, alienates some of his musicians and is in danger of losing custody of Half Pint, his son. He hires Linda Rogers to be the boy's tutor.

After being encouraged by Linda to pursue his dream of playing at the Cocoanut Grove nightclub in Los Angeles, they pack up friend Dixie's new trailer and head west. At a trailer park, they run into Hula Harry and hear a song he's composed. To his amazement, Johnny discovers that not only is Harry very talented, Linda is, too.

The trailer breaks down in Kansas, but the good news is that garage owner Bibb Tucker is a talented fellow as well. He is invited to tag along. When the group reaches L.A., the club date has mistakenly gone to another band. Worse yet, Johnny's apparent flirtation with Hazel De Vore leads to Linda boarding a bus and leaving for home.

Discovering the mistake, Johnny's musicians take matters into their own hands and keep the other band captive, Johnny goes after Linda and gets her back in time for that night's show.

== Cast ==
- Fred MacMurray as Johnny Prentice
- Harriet Hilliard as Linda Rogers
- Ben Blue as Joe De Lemma
- Eve Arden as Sophie De Lemma
- Rufe Davis as Bibb Tucker
- Billy Lee as Half Pint
- George Walcott as Tony Wonder
- Virginia Vale as Hazel De Vore
- Red Stanley as Dixie
- Harry Owens as Hula Harry
- Ellen Drew as Radio Station Receptionist
- Randy Oness as Band Singer
- Harry Owens and His Royal Hawaiians as Royal Hawaiian Orchestra
- The Yacht Club Boys as Singing Quartette
