= Millions in the Air =

1935 film by Ray McCarey

- Theatrical release poster
- Directed by: Ray McCarey
- Screenplay by: Sig Herzig; Jane Storm
- Produced by: Harold Hurley
- Starring: John Howard; Wendy Barrie; Willie Howard; George Barbier; Benny Baker; Eleanore Whitney; Robert Cummings
- Cinematography: Harry Fischbeck
- Edited by: Ellsworth Hoagland
- Production company: Paramount Pictures
- Distributed by: Paramount Pictures
- Release date: December 12, 1935
- Running time: 71 minutes
- Country: United States
- Language: English

Millions in the Air is a 1935 American comedy film directed by Ray McCarey and written by Sig Herzig and Jane Storm. The film stars John Howard, Wendy Barrie, Willie Howard, George Barbier, Benny Baker, Eleanore Whitney and Robert Cummings. The film was released on December 12, 1935, by Paramount Pictures.

== Plot ==
Amateur performers on Colonel Edwards' popular radio show get a gong rung by the show's sponsor, soap mogul Calvin Keller, if they aren't good. It doesn't surprise the audience when would-be opera singer Tony Pagano is judged as a disappointment, but the act of Eddie Warren and Marion Keller wowed the crowd. Everyone is stunned when they, too, get the gong.

Marion's fiancé Gordon Rogers dislikes her being a vaudeville entertainer. Eddie, an ice cream vendor, wants to succeed with or without her, but he's jealous when he learns of Marion's relationship with Gordon and parts ways with her. He is also irked when his pal Jimmy wins the radio contest along with his old dance partner, Bubbles.

During the next show, Keller gets so many complaints from listeners and audience members that he insists Colonel Edwards reunite the team of Eddie and Marion that very night. It takes some doing, but ultimately the twosome steals the show.

== Cast ==
- John Howard as Eddie Warren
- Wendy Barrie as Marion Keller
- Willie Howard as Tony Pagano
- George Barbier as Calvin Keller
- Benny Baker as Benny
- Eleanore Whitney as Bubbles
- Robert Cummings as Jimmy
- Catherine Doucet as Mrs. Waldo-Walker
- Samuel S. Hinds as Colonel Edwards
- Halliwell Hobbes as Theodore
- Dave Chasen as Dave
- Stephen Chase as Gordon Rogers III
- Benny Bartlet as Kid Pianist
- Billy Gilbert as Nikolas Popadopolis
- Ralph Malone as Jason
- Frances Robinson as Sally
- Irving Bacon as Mr. Perkins
- Inez Courtney as Miss Waterbury
- Harry C. Bradley as Mr. Waldo-Walker
- Russell Hicks as Davis
- Harry Tenbrook as Mike
- Paul Fix as Hank
- Marion Hargrove as Blonde
- Joan Davis as Singer
- Adrienne Marden as Girl
- Paul Newlan as Charles Haines

== Production ==
Cummings was cast in August 1935.
