= Ben Blue =

Canadian-American actor and comedian (1901–75)

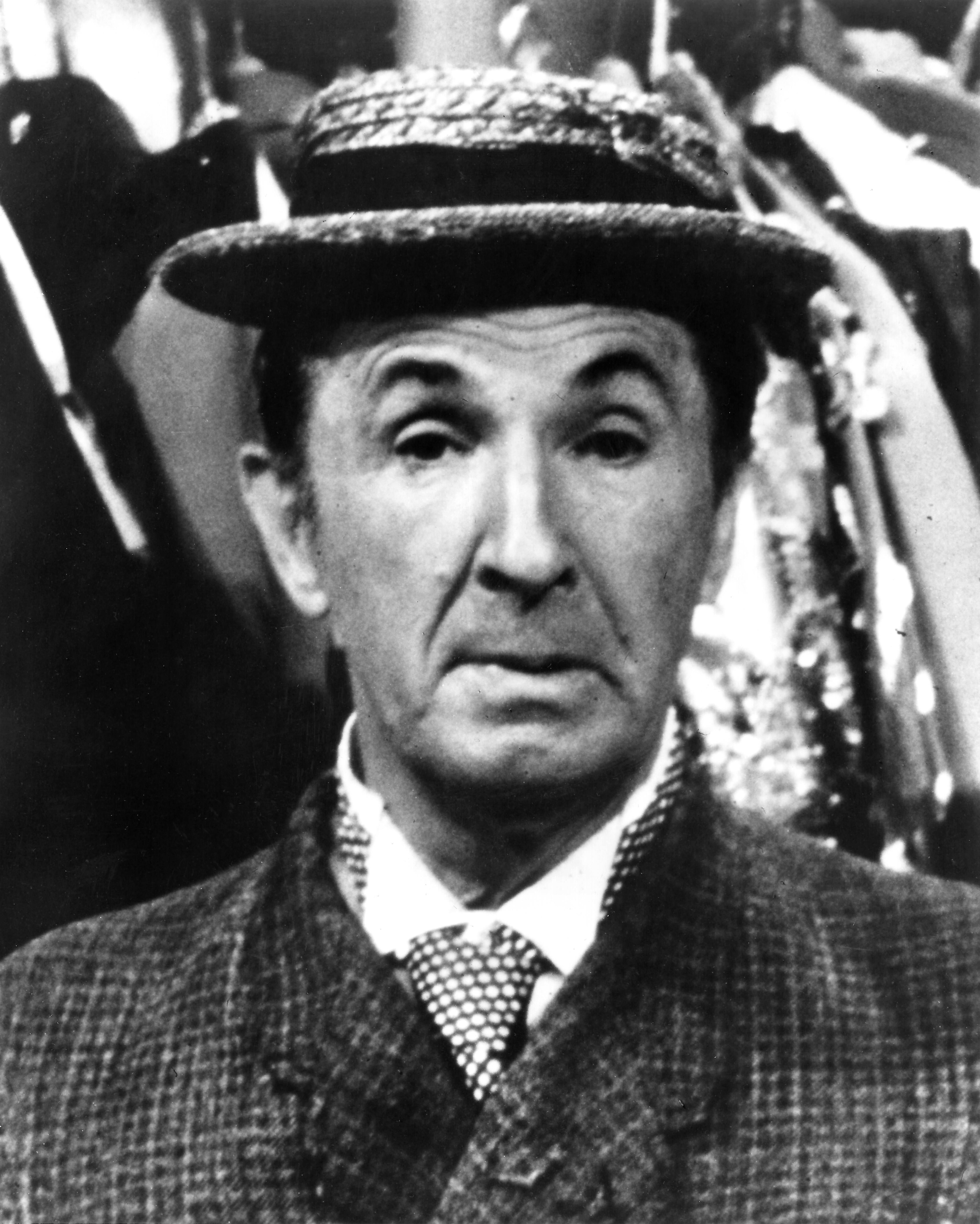
- Press photo of Blue from the 1972 TV special Once Upon a Tour.
- Born: Benjamin Bernstein; 12 September 1901; Montréal, Quebec, Canada
- Died: 7 March 1975 (aged 73); Los Angeles, California, U.S.
- Resting place: Hillside Memorial Park Cemetery, Culver City, California
- Occupations: Musician; actor; comedian
- Years active: 1916–1975
- Spouses: Mary Blue (m. 1922; div. 1937) Axie Dunlap (m. 1940)
- Children: 3

Ben Blue (born Benjamin Bernstein; 9 December 1901 – 7 March 1975) was a Canadian-American actor and comedian whose varied career on stage, in movies, and in television appearances, spanned nearly 50 years.

== Early life ==
Benjamin Bernstein was born in Montreal, Quebec, on 12 September 1901 to David Asher Bernstein and Sadie (née Goldberg), who were Jewish. He emigrated to Baltimore, Maryland, at the age of nine, where he later won a contest for the best impersonation of Charlie Chaplin.

== Career ==
At age fifteen he was in a touring company, and later became a stage manager and assistant general manager. He became a dance instructor and nightclub proprietor. In the 1920s Blue joined a popular orchestra, Jack White and His Montrealers. The entire band emphasized comedy and would continually interact with the joke-cracking maestro. Blue, the drummer, would sometimes deliver corny jokes while wearing a ridiculously false beard. The band relocated to the United States, and appeared in two early sound musicals — the Vitaphone short subject Jack White and His Montrealers and Universal's feature-length 2-strip Technicolor revue King of Jazz (1930).

In 1930, Blue toured with the "Earl Carroll Vanities". He later left the band to establish himself as a solo comedian, portraying a bald-headed dumb-bell with a goofy expression. Around that time he dubbed himself 'Ben Blue', later explaining that it would fit better than 'Bernstein' on theater marquees. Producer Hal Roach featured him in his "Taxi Boys" comedy shorts, but Blue's dopey character was an acquired taste and he was soon replaced by other comedians. Later in the 1930s he worked at Paramount Pictures, notably in The Big Broadcast of 1938, and later at Metro-Goldwyn-Mayer, in films such as Easy to Wed.

In 1950, he had a short-lived TV series, The Ben Blue Show, and was also a regular on The Frank Sinatra Show.

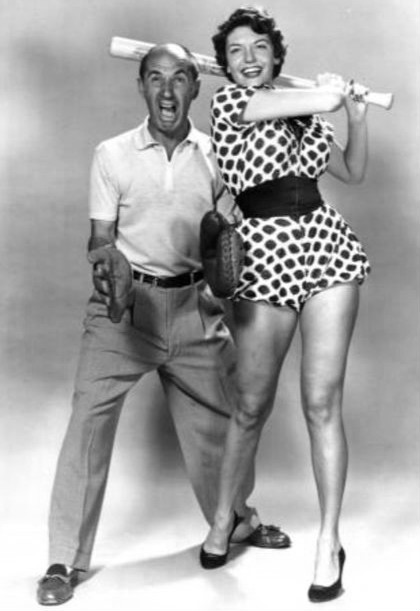
Blue was a guest star on the summer replacement television show Saturday Night Revue in 1954.

In 1951, Blue began concentrating on managing and appearing in nightclubs in Hollywood and San Francisco, California. He once appeared in a Reno, Nevada nightclub called the Dollhouse where he lost $25,000 to its owner, Bill Welch. Blue and Maxie Rosenbloom owned and performed at Slapsie Maxie's, Hollywood's top nightclub in the 1940s. Again, in the 1960s he opened a nightclub in Santa Monica, California, called Ben Blue's. It quickly became the "in" place and night after night was packed with top celebrities. Blue closed the club three years later because of health problems. Blue made the cover of TV Guide′s June 11, 1954 Special Issue along with Alan Young, headlining an edition that covered that season's summer replacement shows. He also made appearances in TV shows such as The Jack Benny Program and The Milton Berle Show.

In 1958 he had major surgery. In 1958 he starred in a television pilot called Ben Blue's Brothers, in which he played four different parts. The show did not get picked up by a network, but the pilot was seen in 1965.

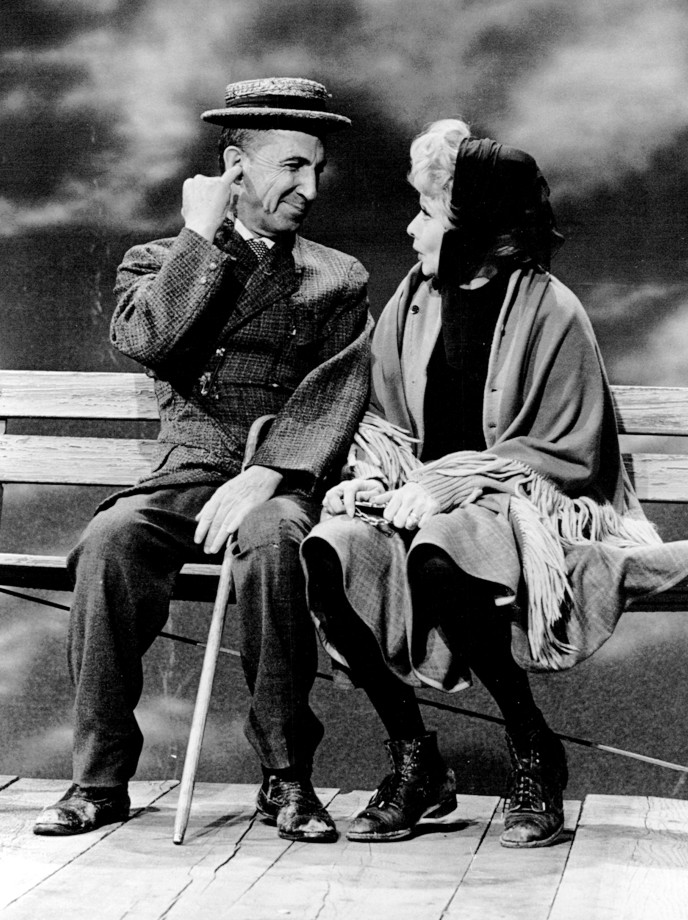
With Lucille Ball on a Jack Benny TV special (1968)

In 1964 Blue was indicted by a federal grand jury on six counts of tax evasion for the non-payment of more than $39,000 (approximately $405,000 today) in income taxes from the nightclub he operated, the Merry-Go-Round, in Santa Monica, California. The case was contested for five years, before he pled no contest to a single count of evading corporate tax. He was fined $1,000, with the payment suspended.

Blue had a recurring role in Jerry Van Dyke's television series Accidental Family in 1967. His film roles included many cameo appearances. In It's a Mad, Mad, Mad, Mad World (1963), he portrayed the pilot of the Standard J-1 biplane that flew Sid Caesar and Edie Adams. In The Russians Are Coming, the Russians Are Coming (1966) he played the town drunk. Other film appearances included small roles in The Busy Body (1967), A Guide for the Married Man (1967) and Where Were You When the Lights Went Out? (1968). He made one of his last television appearances in Land of the Giants in 1969. He was also seen the following year in the Dora Hall vanity syndicated television special, "Once Upon a Tour".

== Personal life ==
Blue married his first wife, Mary, in New York in 1922. They had a daughter, Jeanne, in 1923. Mary was granted a divorce from Blue on 3 December 1937 in Los Angeles. He was ordered to pay $600 (approximately $13,000 today) monthly alimony. The judge told him: "You are no exception to the rule that theatrical careers do not last long, and yours already has been a long one." Blue later married Axie Mae Dunlap (1916—1990). Their two children were sons Tom and Robert.

== Death ==
Blue died in Hollywood, California, on March 7, 1975. He was interred in the Hillside Memorial Park Cemetery in Culver City, California.

== Legacy ==
After his death, his career papers covering 1935 to 1955 were deposited in the Special Collections at the University of California, Los Angeles Library.

== Filmography ==
- The Arcadians (1927) - Simplicitas Smith
- College Holiday (1936) - Stage Hand
- Follow Your Heart (1936) - Himself
- Turn Off the Moon (1937) - Luke
- High, Wide, and Handsome (1937) - Zeke
- Artists and Models (1937) - Jupiter Pluvius
- Thrill of a Lifetime (1937) - Skipper
- The Big Broadcast of 1938 (1938) - Mike
- College Swing (1938) - Ben Volt
- Cocoanut Grove (1938) - Joe De Lemma
- Paris Honeymoon (1939) - Sitska
- Panama Hattie (1942) - Rowdy
- For Me and My Gal (1942) - Sid Simms
- Thousands Cheer (1943) - Chuck Polansky
- Broadway Rhythm (1944) - Felix Gross
- Two Girls and a Sailor (1944) - Ben
- Two Sisters from Boston (1946) - Wrigley
- Easy to Wed (1946) - Spike Dolan
- My Wild Irish Rose (1947) - Hopper
- One Sunday Afternoon (1948) - Nick
- It's a Mad, Mad, Mad, Mad World (1963) - Biplane pilot
- The Russians Are Coming, the Russians Are Coming (1966) - Luther Grilk
- The Busy Body (1967) - Felix Rose
- A Guide for the Married Man (1967) - Technical Adviser (Shoeless)
- Where Were You When the Lights Went Out? (1968) - Man with a Razor
- The Sky's the Limit (1975) - Ben
