= Touchdown, Army =

1938 film by Kurt Neumann

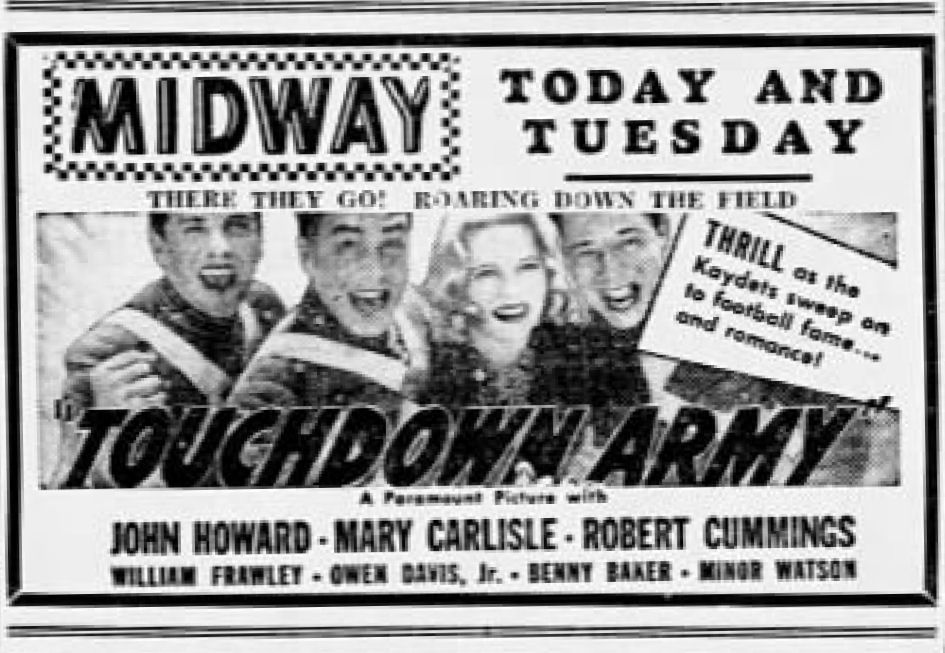
- Newspaper advertisement
- Directed by: Kurt Neumann
- Screenplay by: Lloyd Corrigan; Erwin S. Gelsey
- Produced by: Edward T. Lowe Jr.
- Starring: John Howard; Mary Carlisle; Robert Cummings; William Frawley; Owen Davis Jr. Benny Baker
- Cinematography: Victor Milner
- Edited by: Arthur P. Schmidt
- Music by: John Leipold
- Production company: Paramount Pictures
- Distributed by: Paramount Pictures
- Release date: October 7, 1938
- Running time: 70 minutes
- Country: United States
- Language: English

Touchdown, Army retitled Generals of Tomorrow in the UK is a 1938 American comedy film directed by Kurt Neumann, written by Lloyd Corrigan and Erwin S. Gelsey, and starring John Howard, Mary Carlisle, Robert Cummings, William Frawley, Owen Davis Jr., and Benny Baker. It was released on October 7, 1938, by Paramount Pictures.

== Plot ==
Army University football player, Jimmy Howal, gets a reception far different from what he expected when he enters West Point. His cocky attitude makes everyone opposed to him, especially hot-tempered southerner, Brandon Culpepper, who also sees Howal as a rival for beautiful Toni Denby; daughter of West Point officer Colonel Denby. Howal is failing French prior to the Army-Navy game, and the cadets fear he will be kept from playing because of it. Toni then tutors Howal, but she, unknowingly, uses an old exam which is the basis for the new test. Howal realizes what has happened when he passes the exam with flying colors and suspects Toni of having set out to make a fool of him.

== Cast ==
- John Howard as Cadet Brandon Culpepper
- Mary Carlisle as Toni Denby
- Robert Cummings as Cadet Jimmy Howal
- William Frawley as Jack Heffernan
- Owen Davis Jr. as Cadet Kirk Reynolds
- Benny Baker as Cadet Dick Mycroft
- Minor Watson as Col. Denby
- Raymond Hatton as Bob Haskins

== Production ==
Lew Ayres was meant to play a lead but Robert Cummings – who was already in the cast – took the part instead, promoted from a more subsidiary role. Filming started June 1938.

== See also ==
- List of American football films
