= I Love Lucy: The Movie =

1953 American unreleased film spin-off from sitcom I Love Lucy

I Love Lucy
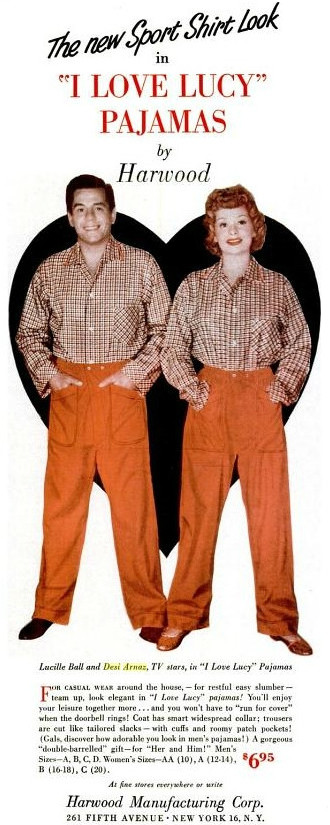
- Directed by: Marc Daniels (original episodes); Edward Sedgwick (new footage)
- Written by: Jess Oppenheimer; Madelyn Pugh; Bob Carroll Jr.
- Produced by: Jess Oppenheimer
- Starring: Lucille Ball; Desi Arnaz; Vivian Vance; William Frawley
- Edited by: Dann Cahn
- Music by: Eliot Daniel
- Production company: Desilu
- Distributed by: Metro-Goldwyn-Mayer; CBS; Paramount Home Entertainment (2007)
- Release dates: October 23, 2007; April 27, 2010 (Single release)
- Running time: 81 minutes
- Country: United States
- Language: English

I Love Lucy (also known as I Love Lucy: The Movie) is a 1953 American comedy film that is a spin-off of the sitcom I Love Lucy. Except for one test screening in Bakersfield, California, the film was never theatrically released and was shelved.

Lucille Ball and Desi Arnaz co-star. Some scenes were directed by Edward Sedgwick, Ball's old friend from their years at MGM. It was Sedgwick's last film; he died in May 1953.

== Plot ==
The film plays out with three first-season episodes edited together into a single story: "The Benefit", "Breaking the Lease", and "The Ballet", with new footage included between episodes to form one coherent storyline. As the series routinely took the format of filming scenes in chronological order, this adds to the "show within a show within a show" format of the film, as viewers watch the cast perform the episodes live. The film itself ends with a "curtain call", as the cast comes out and Arnaz thanks the audience for their support.

== Cast ==
- Lucille Ball as Lucy Ricardo / Herself
- Desi Arnaz as Ricky Ricardo / Himself
- Vivian Vance as Ethel Mertz / Herself
- William Frawley as Fred Mertz / Himself

== Development ==
Shortly after the end of the first season of I Love Lucy, Desi Arnaz and Lucille Ball decided to cash in on their show's popularity by compiling several episodes of the first season of the series into a theatrical feature film. They formed the Lucille Ball-Desi Arnaz Film Company, with Ball, Arnaz, and director Edward Sedgwick as senior officers.

== Format and framing sequences ==
Unlike most movie adaptations, I Love Lucy: The Movie is presented as a "show within a show within a show". The new footage shows a married couple (played by Ann Doran and Benny Baker) attending the filming of an episode of I Love Lucy. After an opening sequence of the couple arriving at the studio, the show's announcer Roy Rowan introduces Desi Arnaz, who speaks to the studio audience and introduces the cast (something Arnaz would do throughout the run of the series). The new closing sequence has Ball, Arnaz, Vance, and Frawley—dressed and posed to match the TV footage—breaking character as the filming ends and taking their bows. The live-audience laugh track heard in the TV episodes is cleverly explained away by making the audience part of the movie action.

== Completed but shelved ==
A test screening in Bakersfield, California, went very well and Desilu prepared to release the film through independent distributor United Artists. But Metro-Goldwyn-Mayer executives demanded that the film be shelved, because they felt it would diminish interest in the upcoming MGM film, The Long, Long Trailer, which co-stars Ball and Arnaz were contractually bound to promote. The I Love Lucy movie was ultimately forgotten.

After plans for a theatrical release were scuttled by MGM, the film was largely forgotten and the twelve minutes of new footage shot for the film were considered to be lost forever. However, in 2001, the film was found and clips of it were featured in I Love Lucy's 50th Anniversary Special. A screening was held in August 2001 at the fifth Loving Lucy fan convention in Burbank, California.

== Home media ==
The film was released on DVD on October 23, 2007, as one of the features on a bonus disc in the I Love Lucy: Complete Series boxed set.

The disc received a separate release on April 27, 2010.

In 2015, the movie was released in 1080p as part of I Love Lucy: Ultimate Season 2.
