= Movie prologue =

A movie prologue or prolog was a short live vaudeville show, performed at the start of film showings in movie theaters in the United States, especially at the end of the silent film era in the 1920s and early 1930s.

The idea was first introduced by Sid Grauman in 1918 at his theaters in Hollywood. Many imitations followed. Some were elaborately staged performances, which often overshadowed the viewings of the films themselves. They were often introduced by a master of ceremonies, such as a bandleader or a radio personality. They were "an extremely popular, hybrid form of performance originally devised as a way to offset the public's boredom with silent films".

The leading movie theaters had elaborate sets, generally in an Art Deco style or incorporating exotic motifs, which acted as a backdrop for music and dance shows often featuring many chorus girls. Each of the major movie companies had their own team of designers and choreographers, and each had their own style. Leading producers and choreographers included Fanchon and Marco, Leon Leonidoff, Chester Hale, J. A. Partington, and Samuel "Roxy" Rothafel. Some included a variety of performers, including comedians, acrobats and novelty acts. Fanchon and Marco began producing prologues, initially at the Paramount Theatre in Los Angeles, in 1922, and by 1931 produced about fifty hour-long productions each year with a staff of six thousand; they ceased their production in 1936.

The popularity of movie prologues contributed to the survival of the movie business during the Great Depression. However, only a small number of theatres continued to use them after the late 1930s. Their development and production was the fictionalised subject of the 1933 movie Footlight Parade, starring James Cagney and choreographed by Busby Berkeley.
