= Harlan Ware =

American writer (1902-1967)

- Born: William Harlan Ware; July 14, 1902; Lakota, North Dakota, US
- Died: May 7, 1967 (aged 64); Evanston, Illinois, US
- Occupation: Writer
- Notable work: Come Fill the Cup; One Man's Family
- Spouse: Ruth Susan Seitz
- Children: 3

Harlan Ware (July 14, 1902 – May 7, 1967) was an American writer who wrote novels, screenplays, radio scripts, and short stories.

== Career ==
Ware began his career as a police reporter in the city of Chicago, working for various newspapers, including the Shreveport Times and the City News Bureau of Chicago.

In 1954, Ware moved from Los Angeles to Carmel-by-the-Sea, California, with his wife Ruth and two daughters. In 1966, he moved to Wisconsin

In 1964, Ware coauthored two books with William Hornaday, The Inner Light, and Your Aladdin's Lamp. In 1979, the Literary Hall of Fame voted Your Aladdin's Lamp as the Inspirational Book of the Year.

== Death ==
Ware died in a Chicago hospital on May 7, 1967. Private funeral services were held in Chicago, and he was later buried in the family plot at the Evanston, Illinois Cemetery.
