= John Leipold =

American composer (1888–1970)

John Max Leipold (February 26, 1888 in Hunter, NY – March 8, 1970 in Dallas, TX) was a prolific American film and radio score composer. He is most noted for winning 1939 Academy Award for Best Original Score for the film Stagecoach, along with Richard Hageman, Frank Harling, and Leo Shuken.

== Biography ==
Leipold was born in Hunter, NY in 1888 to John G. and Lena M. Leipold. In 1916 he married Caroline Anna Ebel (1889–1982) in Poughkeepsie, New York.

From 1912 to 1922 he conducted vaudeville and light opera in New York. He then spent four years as music director for the Al G. Field Minstrels, where he directed the orchestra and chorus and contributed original music. He was likely hired by Joseph Hatfield after Al G. Field Minstrel founder Al G. Field's death. From 1927 to 1928 he was an arranger for Remick Music. He wrote music for circus bandleader Merle Evans.

In 1928 he moved to Hollywood and worked in Paramount Studios' music department. He began as a librarian under Nat W. Finston, where he would select stock music for films and add his own compositions. He contributed music and arrangements to hundreds of films, most of it uncredited (including two Marx Brothers films). In 1939 his contributions to the score for Stagecoach were awarded the Academy Award; this led to him scoring a number of westerns for Harry Sherman Productions from 1939 to 1942.

Starting in 1942 he began to compose mostly for CBS, including for two Three Stooges films. From 1943 to 1948 he was composing and conducting for CBS; his output dwindled after this. He died in Dallas, TX in 1970.

He wrote two educational texts, The John Leipold Lessons in Counterpoint, and The John Leipold Lessons in Harmony, and advertised them in musical trades. In 1952 he wrote another text Mathematics of Pitch.

== Selected filmography ==
- Innocents of Paris (1929)
- Behind the Make-Up (1930)
- Playboy of Paris (1930)
- Monkey Business (1931)
- Horse Feathers (1932)
- It’s a Gift (1934)
- This Reckless Age (1932)
- One Hour With You (1932)
- Make Me a Star (1932)
- Hot Saturday (1932)
- El Príncipe gondolero (1933)
- The Old Fashioned Way (1934)
- Forgotten Faces (1936)
- A Son Comes Home (1936)
- Bulldog Drummond's Revenge (1937)
- Girl Overboard (1937)
- Bulldog Drummond's Peril (1938)
- Bluebeard's Eighth Wife (1938)
- Touchdown, Army (1938)
- Stagecoach (1939)
- The Quarterback (1940)
- Doomed Caravan (1941)
- Shut My Big Mouth (1942)
- Two Yanks in Trinidad (1942)
- Daring Young Man (1942)
- The Desperadoes (1943)
- Doughboys in Ireland (1943)
- Nine Girls (1944)
- Incendiary Blonde (1945)
