= Nevada (disambiguation) =

Nevada is a state in the southwestern part of the United States.

Nevada may also refer to:

== Other places ==
=== United States ===
- Nevada, Illinois
- Nevada, Indiana
- Nevada, Iowa
- Nevada, Missouri
- Nevada, Ohio
- Nevada, Texas
- Nevada County, Arkansas
- Nevada County, California

=== Other countries ===
- Nevada, Ravno, Bosnia and Herzegovina
- Nevada, Serbia
- Nevada, Spain

== Arts, entertainment and media ==
=== Films ===
- Nevada (1927 film), a film starring Gary Cooper
- Nevada (1935 film), a film starring Buster Crabbe
- Nevada (1944 film), a film starring Robert Mitchum
- Nevada (1997 film), a film directed by Gary Tieche

=== Literature ===
- Nevada (comics), a comic series published by DC under its Vertigo imprint
- Nevada (Binnie novel), a 2013 novel by Imogen Binnie
- Nevada (Grey novel), a 1927 novel by Zane Grey

=== Music ===
- Nevada (musician), an American musician, DJ, producer, and songwriter
- Nevada (British band), a British folk/progressive rock band
- Nevada (Portuguese band), a Portuguese duo
- "Nevada" (Vicetone song), featuring Cozi Zuehlsdorff
- "Nevada" (YoungBoy Never Broke Again song)
- "Nevada", song by Riders in the Sky from Prairie Serenade
- "Nevada", song by John Linnell from State Songs
- "Nevada", song by Sematary and Ghost Mountain from Grave House

== People ==
=== Given name ===
- Nevada Barr (born 1952), American mystery novelist
- Nevada Stoody Hayes (1870–1941), American socialite
- Nevada Phillips (born 1957), Barbadian-born English cricketer
- Nevada Smith (basketball) (born 1981), American professional basketball coach
- Nevada N. Stranahan (1861–1928), American politician
- Nevada Van der Veer (1884–1958), American contralto singer

=== Surname ===
- Emma Nevada (1859–1940), American operatic soprano
- Mignon Nevada (1886–1971), English operatic soprano and daughter of Emma Nevada

== Other uses ==
- Nevada, development code name for the Oracle Solaris release following Solaris 10
- Renault Nevada, a model of automobile
- USS Nevada, a United States naval vessel

== See also ==
- Nevada City (disambiguation)
- Nevada County (disambiguation)
- Nevada Township (disambiguation)
- Sierra Nevada (disambiguation)
- Navada (disambiguation)
- Nevada Fall, a waterfall on the Merced River in Yosemite National Park, California, US
- Nevada Gulch, a valley in South Dakota, US
- Supershow Nevada, a Bulgarian TV game show
- University of Nevada, Reno
  - Nevada Wolf Pack, the school's athletic program
- Killing of Satomi Mitarai, or the Nevada-tan murder
