= Nawada (disambiguation) =

Nawada is a city and municipality in Bihar, India.

Nawada may also refer to these places in India:

- Nawada district, of Bihar with the city as its capital
  - Nawada railway station
  - Nawada (Lok Sabha constituency)
  - Nawada (Vidhan Sabha constituency)
- Nawada, Jagir, a village in Uttar Pradesh
- Nawada, Mainpuri, a village in Uttar Pradesh
- Nawada, Uttar Pradesh, a village in the Saharanpur, Uttar Pradesh
- Nawada Fatehpur, a village in Haryana
- Nawada metro station, a rapid transit station of the Delhi Metro

== See also ==
- Navada (disambiguation)
