= Saligrama, Udupi =

Saligrama
- town in Brahmavar taluk
- Location in Karnataka, India Saligrama (India)
- Coordinates: 13.50°N 74.80°E
- Country: India
- State: Karnataka
- District: Udupi District

Population (2011)
  - Total: 15,138

Languages
  - Official: Kannada
- Time zone: UTC+5:30 (IST)
- PIN: 576225
- Telephone code: 0820
- Vehicle registration: KA-20

Saligrama is a town on NH 66 in Brahmavara taluk of Udupi district in the Indian state of Karnataka. It is located between Kundapura and Brahmavar. It is 24 km north of Udupi and 81 km from Mangalore.

== Demographics ==
As of 2001 India census, Saligrama had a population of 14,959. The male population constitute 47% of the population and female population consists of 53%. Saligram has an average literacy rate of 74%, higher than the national average of 59.5%: male literacy is 81%, and female literacy is 68%. In Saligram, 9% of the population is under 6 years of age.

The name is derived from the sacred stone Saligrama worshipped by the Vaishnavas Smarthas (Hindus) as an aniconic symbol of Lord Vishnu.

Saligrama has special importance for those who follow Lord Guru Narasimha as their community deity. It was believed that the community followed Lord Guru Narasimha as their spiritual guru instead of following mutts for spiritual guidance as an image of Lord Narasimha appeared in Raja Bhattacharya's dream instructing him to do so.

Most of the people of Saligrama are Kota Brahmins. The main language spoken in Saligrama is Kundagannada. Tulu and Konkani is also spoken here.

== Transportation ==
Saligrama is located approximately midway between Udupi and Kundapur on National Highway 66. Bus service is available from Udupi and Kundapur. Direct bus service is available from Saligrama to the state capital Bangalore and Mumbai. Local means of transport is through autos and taxis.

== Places of worship ==
- Guru Narasimha and Anjaneya (Hanuman) devasthana, known for annual car festival.
- Vishnu Murthy devasthana in Parampalli is nearly 800 years old.
- Durga Parameshwari devasthana situated at Muduhole Karkada
- Bhagavathi devasthana, Gundmi

== Notable people ==
- Kalinga Navada, Yakshagana artist
- K. Shivarama Karantha, writer

== Places of interest ==
- Padukere samudra, is on the coast of the Arabian sea. The village Padukere is located on 3 km west of Saligrama.
- Kavdi river and Barkur bridge.
