= Forlorn River (disambiguation) =

Forlorn River is a Western novel written by Zane Grey.

Forlorn River may also refer to:

- Forlorn River (1926 film), American silent film based on the novel
- Forlorn River (1937 film), American film
