= Uppoor (surname) =

Uppoor is a surname. Notable people with the surname include:

- Naranappa Uppoor (1918–1984), Indian singer
- Pradeep Uppoor (1958–2023), Indian film producer
