= Types of shaligrams =

Classification of ammonite fossils sacred in Hinduism

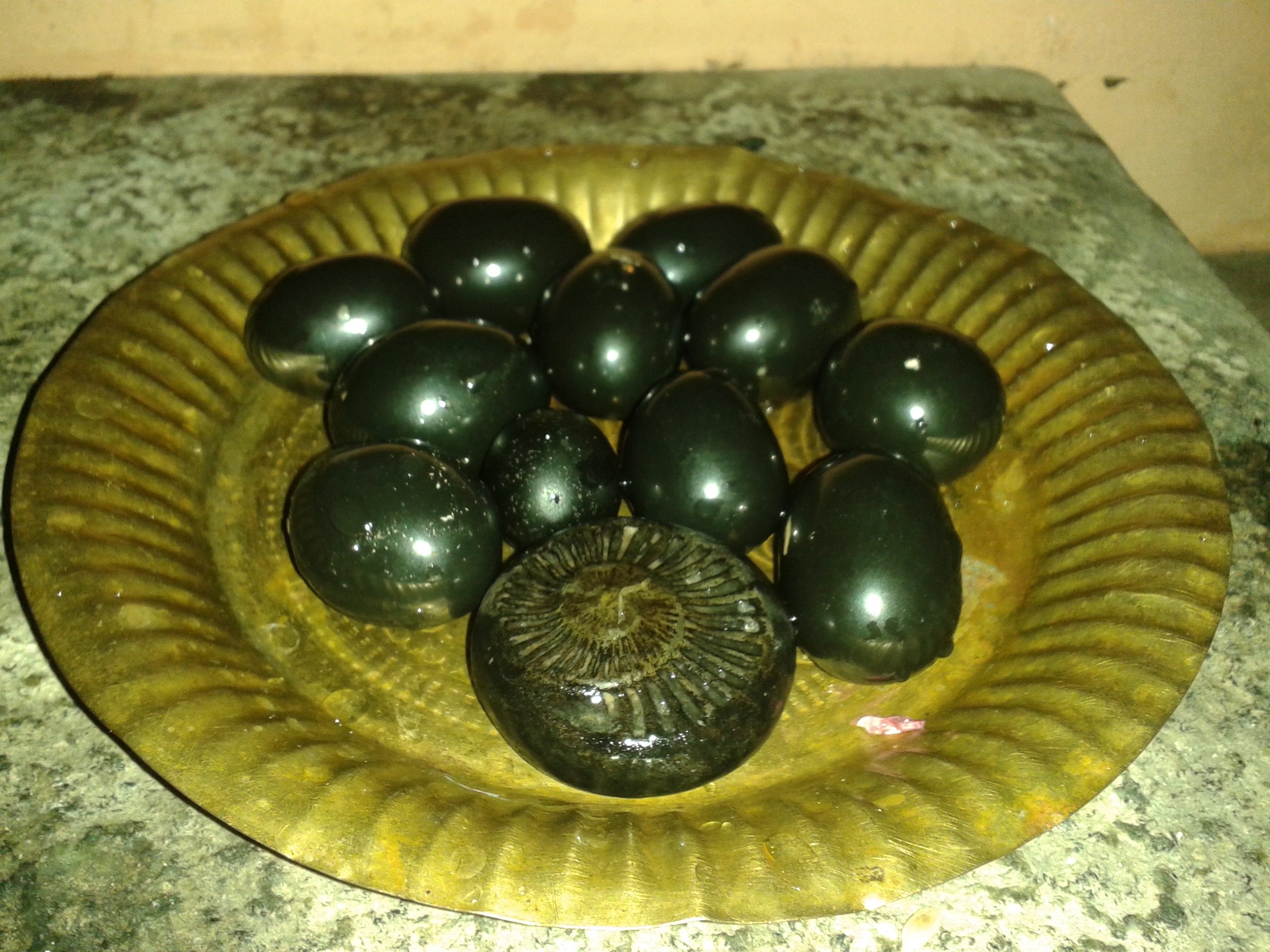
Shaligrams on a plate

A shaligram is an ammonite or fossilized stone, found in or near the Kali Gandaki. Works of Hindu literature such as the Viramitrodaya, Chaturvarga-chintamani, Matsyasukta, Vaishvanara Samhita, Puranasamgraha, and the Pranatoshani Tantra refer to various types of shaligrams. These types are defined on the basis of shape, colour, the imprint of the Ammonoidea (ammonite) shell on the surface of the stone, the aperture through which the imprint can be seen, and other distinct markings.

A detailed classification of shaligrams is provided in the Meru Tantra, and in the book Shalagrama Kosha compiled by S. K. Ramachandra Rao from a manuscript named Shalagrama Pariksha written by a Telugu Brahmin named Anupasimha, and unpublished sections of the Sritattvanidhi dealing with shaligrams.

== Markings ==
- The imprints of the ammonite are referred to as the chakra, as they resemble the Sudarshana Chakra, the discus of Vishnu.
- The aperture, known as the mukha, vadana or dvara, resembles an open mouth.
- The vanamala is a white line in the body of the stone which resembles a garland.
- A bindu is a circular marking on the outer surface of the rock.
- A shankha is a conch marking in the rock.

== Description of types of shaligrams in Hindu literature and their significance ==
Name	Distinguishing Features	Effect upon being worshipped
Keshava	Marked with a single chakra, a vanamala, and four bindus of golden hue arranged in a square.; Marked with a shankha and chakra on the lower middle portion.	Grants prosperity and fulfilment of all desires.
Hayagriva	Blue in colour at the top, shaped like an elephant goad or the head of a horse, with a linear mark present near the chakra and several bindus.; Marked with five linear marks, its other characteristics being the same as above.; Marked with a single chakra and a marking resembling a banner.; Has both yellow and red colours on its surface, two chakras, and markings resembling earrings and gems on the sides. Shaped like an elephant goad or lotus bud.; Shaped like a lotus bud, the mukha being shaped like the head of a horse, with a marking resembling a rosary.; Green in colour, marked with a single chakra, the left side being elevated like that of a kapinjala (grey francolin) bird.	Grants knowledge, prosperity and wordly enjoyment.
Paramesthin	Has a hole (which does not reach the other side of the stone, otherwise the stone would be unfit for worship) at the top, a single chakra, markings resembling a lotus, and several bindus; White in colour, has a single chakra, and markings resembling a lotus, a snake's hood, a pearl necklace, or a sphere, with a perforated and hard top.; Reddish in colour and circular in shape with a single chakra and linear mark, perforated and hard.; Round in shape, yellow in colour, with a hole at the top; Red/white in colour, yellowish and perforated on the top surface, marked with a single chakra and markings resembling a lotus.	Grants enjoyment and liberation.
Hiranyagarbha	Honey-coloured and slightly elongated in shape, with several golden linear marks on the body, a crystal-like glow, and a shape like the round moon.; Black in colour, round in shape, the vadana is glazed, marked with a single chakra, and a marking resembling the shrivatsa on the top surface.	Grants prosperity and increase in progeny.
Chaturbhuja	Of a blue colour similar to a rain cloud. Round in shape and marked with four chakras.	Grants fearlessness.
Gadadhara	Circular in shape and yellow in colour. The chakra is situated towards the left, the middle part is marked with three linear marks, and markings resembling a banner, a vajra, and an elephant-goad are present.	
Narayana	Shyama (the colour of Krishna's skin) in colour. The chakra is situated in the middle portion, marked with a long linear mark, and the right side is perforated.; The vadana is situated centrally in the body, within which lies the chakra at the front, with markings resembling ornaments like ear-rings, bracelets, and necklaces.; This shaligram can be found in three varieties: 1. Lakshminarayana: Endowed with a single vadana, four chakras, and a vanamala. Circular in shape, the colour is yellow/blue like a fresh rain-cloud, the vadana is glazed and situated towards the left side within which lie four chakras, with markings resembling a banner, a vajra, and an elephant-goad. A vanamala is present, and the top is raised and features some bindus on its surface.; 2. Naranarayana: The chakra is red while the body is green like the tamala tree, with patches of golden colouration.; 3. Rupinarayana: Markings resembling a pestle, a gada, and a shankha are present alongside a single chakra, while another marking resembling a bow is situated near the vadana.	1. Grants all sorts of success.; 2. Grants enjoyment, liberation, fulfilment of all desires, the four aims of human life, and redemption from sins.
Madhava	With a colour similar to honey, marked with a gada and a shankha. The chakra is situated at the middle and is glazed.	Grants liberation.
Govinda	Black in colour, lustrous in appearance, endowed with a single chakra alongside markings resembling a gada on the right side and a mountain on the left.; Black in colour, small in size, with the central portion raised upwards, endowed with a large vadana marked with five chakras situated towards the left.	
Vishnu	Black in colour with a large chakra. Shaped like a gada, with a linear mark on the top surface near the vadana.	Grants liberation.
Madhusudhana	Golden in colour with a lustrous appearance, has a single chakra and endowed with markings resembling a lotus and a shankha.	Destroys enemies.
Trivikrama	Shyama in colour, triangular in shape, with a shining appearance. Has one or two chakras along with some bindus on the left-side and a linear mark on the right-side.	Grants wealth.
Shridhara	Round in shape like the kadamba flower, endowed with a vanamala and five linear marks at the top surface and sides.; Green in colour, round in shape with a flat upper surface, with a single glazed chakra and markings resembling a lotus in the middle.; Small in size, with two chakras and a vanamala.; Glittering like a gem, endowed with a single chakra, a vanamala, markings resembling a lotus/banner, and a marking resembling an elephant-goad near the vadana.	Grants prosperity to householders.
Hrishikesha	Shaped like a half moon with a single chakra and markings resembling the hair of a boar.	
Padmanabha	Reddish in colour, endowed with a semicircular chakra and markings resembling a lotus and the hairs of an animal's mane.	Causes poverty and sorrow, thus should not be worshipped.
Damodara	Large in size, the colour is as green as durva grass with a small chakra situated in the middle, a small vadana, and a single yellowish linear mark in the middle.; Endowed with two chakras and a cracked outer surface.	Grants auspiciousness.
Sudarshana	Green in colour with a lustrous appearance. The chakra and markings resembling a gada are situated on the left side, while linear markings arranged like a lotus are found on the right side; Black in colour, shaped like a lotus, endowed with a single chakra, a large vadana, and a lowered middle portion.	Destroys all sins and grants the results of all types of worship.
Vasudeva	White in colour, endowed with one or two chakras at the dvara.	Fulfills all desires.
Pradyumna	Yellow in colour, with a small chakra and markings resembling a makara on the sides and top surface, features many holes; Blue in colour with a small chakra, a small mukha, and many holes.	Grants prosperity and happiness to householders.
Aniruddha	Blue in colour, round in shape and glazed, with markings resembling a lotus at the top surface and three linear marks near the dvara.; Black in colour with a beautifully-shaped dvara and a chakra near the centre, another on the sides, and a small chakra at the top surface.; Yellow in colour, round in shape.	Grants happiness to householders.
Purushottama	Golden in colour with one chakra at the middle portion and a bigger chakra at the front; The colour is as yellow as the atasi flower, with many bindus present.; With mukhas on all directions (traditionally ennumerated as ten).	Increases prosperity and grants enjoyment and liberation.
Adhokshaja	Dark black in colour with patches of brown, circular in shape, endowed with a single chakra and red linear marks. May be large or small in size.	Grants auspiciousness to worshippers.
Achyuta	Has four chakras on the right and left sides and two red markings resembling ear-rings at the mukha. Also features markings resembling a shankha, gada, bow, arrow, pestle, banner, white umbrella and a red elephant-goad.	
Upendra	Green in colour with a lustrous appearance. Has a glazed body with one or more chakras on the sides.	
Janardana	Has two dvaras - one on the left side and another on the right side - and four chakras - two on the top surface and other two in the middle.	Grants prosperity and destroys enemies.
Lakshmijanardana	Blue with one dvara and four chakras.	
Hari	Green in colour, round in shape, with one mukha at the top. The lower portion is marked with bindus.	Fulfills all desires.
Ananta	Marked with markings resembling the hood of a snake. Has 20 red chakras, 14 dvaras, and many bindus, with different colours on its body.; The colour is as blue as a rain-cloud. Circular in shape, with 27 chakras.	Grants the four aims of human life and the results of all types of worship.
Yogeshvara	Has a lingam-like structure on its top surface.	Grants redemption from the great sin of brahmahatya.
Pundarikaksha	Has markings resembling a pair of eyes or lotuses on the left side or top surface.	Can bring the entire world under control of the worshipper.
Chaturmukha	Has four linear marks on the sides and two chakras on the middle portion of the body.	
Yajnamurti	Has both yellow and red colours on its surface, with a small dvara and two chakras, one at the middle and the other on the right side.	
Dattatreya	Has white, red and black patches, and markings resembling a rosary on the top surface.; Has red and yellow patches and markings as above.	
Shishumara	Long in shape, with a deep triangular opening and one or two chakras on the front side and another on the back side.	Grants all sorts of success.
Hamsa	Shaped like a bow, with both blue and white colours on its surface, a chakra, and markings resembling a lotus.	Grants salvation.
Parahamsa	The colour is blue like the throat of a peacock, with a glazed body and round dvara, within which lies a single chakra, and a glittering patch resembling the sun on the right side of the chakra. The body also bears two linear marks forming the shape of a boar.	Grants the four aims of human life.
Lakshmipati	Black in colour, with the sides or the front the blue of a peacock's throat. Has a small chakra and a large vadana	Grants prosperity and wealth.
Garudadhvajalakshmipati	Round in shape, with golden marks resembling horns and hooves on the body, and a smooth chakra with black linear marks.	
Batapatrashayin	Round in shape with white, copper-red, and blue colours on its surface, a single vadana in the middle, four chakras, and three bindus. Markings resembling a shankha and a lotus lie to the left and right side of the chakra respectively.	
Vishvambhara	Has 20 chakras on the body.	
Vishvarupa	Circular in shape, with one or five dvaras and many chakras.	Bestows children and grandchildren.
Pitambara	Round like the udder of a cow or a human breast, with a single chakra.	Grants happiness.
Chakrapani	Round in shape and glazed, with a small chakra and many other prints.	
Saptavirashrava	Round in shape with a small chakra and several golden bindus all over the body.	Increases all sorts of prosperity.
Jagadyoni	A single red chakra is present within the dvara.	Grants auspiciousness.
Bahurupin	Has multiple mukhas and a single chakra alongside markings resembling a shankha inside.	Grants salvation.
Harihara	Has four dvaras and two chakras with a structure resembling a shivanabhi (a particular form of a shivalinga) on its top surface.	Grants prosperity and happiness.
Svayambhu	Blue in colour with a large, long mukha and the body encircled by linear marks.	Grants salvation.
Shivanarayana	Has two mukhas and two chakras.	Destroys wealth, property and progeny, hence should not be worshipped.
Shankaranarayana	Has a shivanabhi-like structure on the left or right side.	
Pitamaha	Has four different dvaras with a chakra in each of them.	
Naramurti	Yellow in colour like the atasi flower, with markings resembling a sacred thread on the sides.	
Shesha	Printed with linear marks forming the coiled body of a snake. Although red in colour, it is not considered inauspicious.	
Pralambaghna	Red in colour with the markings resembling the coiled body and hood of a snake.	Causes death, hence should not be worshipped.
Suryamurti	Has 12 different chakras, either on the body surface or inside the dvara.	Destroys illnesses.
Haiheya	Has one mukha and multiple markings resembling hoods, out of which two are found on the right side of the dvara, shaped like a lotus petal with a golden mark resembling an arc.	Grants all sorts of success.
Vishnupanjara	Printed with several linear marks.	
Garuda	Shaped like a lotus with three marks one above the other, the central line being longer. Has four chakras.; Printed with markings resembling a pair of wings and having two, three, or four golden linear marks on the body. Green, blue, or white in colour.	Destroys all sins.
Matsya	Elongated in shape, the colour of gold or bell-metal, and marked with three bindus.; Elongated in shape resembling a fish, green in colour with a crystal-like glow, with two chakras at the middle portion and three bindus.; Has three elongated dvaras, each possessing a chakra, while another chakra is situated at the posterior end shaped like the tail of a fish. The right side is shaped like a cart, and the left side has a linear mark.; Has a long dvara at the right side, endowed with three bindus, a single chakra, and markings resembling a shankha and lotus.; Shaped like a fish, with markings resembling an elongated fish.	Grants enjoyment, liberation, fulfilment of all desires, and auspiciousness.
Kurma	Shaped like a tortoise with the eastern side elevated.; Green in colour, round in shape resembling a tortoise, the top surface being elevated. Featuring red markings resembling Kaustubha, five circular markings resembling the sun, and a chakra.; Endowed with structures resembling the feet of a bed on the sides.; Endowed with a single chakra, three golden bindus, and markings resembling a shankha and a lotus.; Elongated in shape with the mukha extending from the left to the right side, and with five circular markings resembling the sun.; Triangular in shape like the inflorescence of a snuhi plant, with chakras on both sides.; Round in shape resembling a tortoise, with both blue and red colours on its surface, a long dvara, and two chakras imprinted sideways at the middle portion of the body.	Fulfills all sorts of desires and increases progeny.
Varaha	Blue in colour, large in size, and printed with odd number of chakras and three linear marks.; Endowed with an even number of chakras, of which at least one is situated on the right side, and a vanamala. This last variety is called Lakshmi-Varaha.	Grants enjoyment and liberation.
Vamana	Round in shape like the kadamba flower, small in size and marked with five linear marks.; Small in size with glittering appearance. The shape is circular or triangular like the inflorescence of the snuhi flower, with a chakra on both the top and bottom surfaces, and markings resembling the Brahminy kite beside the chakra.; Not very small in size, with single prominent glazedchakra at the centre.; The colour is yellow like the atasi flower with an elevated top surface, white bindus at the mukha, and an indistinct chakra.; The colour is blue like a rain-cloud, and the shape round like the bilva fruit or the seeds of the jujube fruit. Has two chakras, a vanamala, and a small mukha. This last variety is called Dadhivamana.	Grants fulfilment of all desires, happiness, prosperity, increase in property, progeny and wealth of householders.
Parashurama	Yellow or black in colour, with markings resembling an axe. Has a chakra on either the left or the right side, and markings resembling teeth either at the top surface or on the sides.	Prevents untimely death.
Buddha	Has a very small mukha but no chakra. It is also called Nivita (hidden) Buddha	Grants moksha.
Kalki	Black, with six chakras and markings resembling a sword/dagger over the mukha on the top surface.; Shaped like the face of a horse and marked with three chakras.	Destroys all evil caused by Kali Yuga.
Narasimha	Has a very large mukha, two chakras, and linear marks resembling the mane of a lion. This shaligram can be found in eleven varieties.: 1. Kapilanarasimha: Has three or five bindus, two large chakras in the middle, prominent linear marks, and teeth-like projections in the large mukha. Circular in shape and tawny in colour like jaggery or lac.; 2. Lakshminarasimha: Has a large mukha, two chakras on the left side, three or five bindus, and a vanamala.; 3. Vidarananarasimha: Has a very large mukha with teeth-like projections and two chakras within.; 4. Sarvatomukhanarasimha: Golden in colour with multiple mukhas and seven chakras.; 5. Patalanarasimha: Has multiple dvaras, multiple chakras (three at the dvara and ten at the sides), and multiple colours.; 6. Akashanarasimha: Has a large mukha and an elevated chakra in the middle. To be worshipped only by monks.; 7. Rakshasanarasimha: Golden in colour with a large mukha and multiple holes.; 8. Jivanarasimha: Has two large mukhas, two chakras, and an elevated front.; 9. Adhomukhanarasimha: Has three chakras: one inside, one on the top surface, and another on the sides.; 10. Jvalanarasimha: Has a small mukha, two chakras, and a vanamala.; 11. Mahanarasimha: Has two chakras and very beautiful, prominent linear marks.	Creates detachment in the mind of the worshipper.: 1. Grants liberation, victory in combat, fulfilment of all desires, and redemption from sins on being worshipped by a celibate. Otherwise causes difficulties and pain.; 2. Grants happiness, liberation, and enjoyment to householders.; 3. Causes fear and inflammation of residence on not being worshipped by a celibate.; 4. Grants the nectar of immortality to monks.; 5. Causes inflammation of one's residence, hence should not be worshipped.; 6. Causes poverty, hence should not be worshipped.; 7. Grants liberation.; 8. Grants freedom from the world.
Ramachandra	Green as durva grass, endowed with a single chakra, markings resembling a staff on the top surface, and two linear marks on the sides. This shaligram can be found in eight varieties.: 1. Ranarama: Neither too large nor too small in size, circular in shape, endowed with two chakras and markings resembling an arrow and a quiver.; 2. Rajarajeshwara: Neither too large nor too small in size, circular in shape, endowed with two or seven chakras and perforated with holes that appear to have been created by arrows. Has markings resembling an umbrella, an arrow, and a quiver.; 3. Sitarama: The colour is blue like a rain cloud, with one or two dvaras, four chakras of which one is situated on the left side, a vanamala, and markings resembling a bow, an arrow, an elephant-goad, a banner, an umbrella, and a chamara.; 4. Dashakanthakulantakarama: Oval in shape like a chicken's egg, green in colour, with an elevated top surface. Has two linear marks at the dvara and a marking resembling a bow at the sides.; 5. Virarama: Has a glazed chakra with the appearance of a lotus filament and markings resembling a bow, an arrow, a quiver, an earring, and a garland.; 6. Vijayarama: Has a single chakra with the appearance of a lotus filament, with red bindus, a gaping vadana, and markings resembling a bow, an arrow and a quiver.; 7. Ramamurti: Black, with a single chakra within the vadana.; 8. Dustarama: The colour is blue like a rain-cloud, with markings resembling a bow and an arrow on the top surface and resembling hooves at the sides.	1. Grants wealth and kingship.; 2. Grants victory and prosperity.; 3. Grants prosperity.; 4. Grants the ability to compose poetry.
Sankarshana	Red in colour, with two chakras joined together on the top side and perforations on the left side. This shaligram can be found in two varieties.: 1. Balabhadra: Marked with seven chakras.; 2. Balarama: Has five linear marks on the top side and markings resembling a bow and an arrow on the rear sides.	Grants happiness to householders.: 1. Grants children and grandchildren.; 2. Grants progeny.
Krishna	Black in colour, with a vanamala and a single chakra at the dvara.; Has yellow patches, with the dvara situated at the middle. The top surface resembles a tortoise shell, with yellow bindus at the sides.; This shaligram can be found in ten varieties.: 1. Balakrisha: Has a long mukha and bindus on both top and bottom surface.; 2. Gopala: Deep black in colour, large in size, endowed with two chakras, a vanamala, triangular markings resembling shrivatsa, and white teeth-like structures at the sides within the mukha which resemble a smile.; 1. Madanagopala: A Gopala shaligram with markings resembling full-bloomed lotuses on the sides, a garland and an earring.; 2. Santanagopala : A Gopala shaligram whose mukha is shaped like a half-moon.; 3. Govardhanagopala : A Gopala shaligram that is circular in shape with the front portion lowered. It features bindus of silvery hue alongside markings resembling a staff and a garland on the sides, another resembling a venu (flute) at the mukha, and a long linear mark on the right side.; 4. Lakshmigopala: A Gopala shaligram which is oval in shape like a chicken's egg, with markings resembling a venu, an earring, and a country plough.; 3. Kaliyamardana: The sides are large and endowed with golden linear marks and three small bindus.; 4. Syamantahari: The colour is white like the blade of a sword. Features a large chakra, a vanamala, and triangular markings resembling shrivatsa on the top surface.; 5. Chanuramardana: Green with two red bindus and linear markings on both left and right sides, resembling a fist.; 6. Kamsamardana: Blue in colour, having a different colour either at the front or on the rear side.	Grants wealth, crops, happiness, and redemption from sins.: 1. Grants progeny and prosperity.; 2. Grants property, crops, and wealth.; 1. Grants children, grandchildren, wealth, and control over the world.; 2. Increases progeny.; 3. Grants fulfilment of all desires, destruction of all enemies, redemption from all sins, cattle, and crops.; 4. Grants progeny, spouse, property, enjoyment, and liberation.; 3. Grants destruction of enemies, progeny, and wealth.; 4. Increases progeny and fame.; 5. Destroys all enemies.
