= Highbrow (disambiguation) =

Highbrow may refer to:

- Highbrow, as a noun and adjective
- Highbrow (Transformers), three fictional characters in the Transformers series
- Going Highbrow, a 1935 American comedy-musical film
