= Navada =

Navada may refer to:

- A misspelling of Nevada, a US state
- Arifpur Navada, Uttar Pradesh, India, a village
- Kalinga Navada (1958–1990), Indian singer

== See also ==
- Nawada (disambiguation)
- Nevada (disambiguation)
