= Her Husband Lies =

1937 drama film by Edward Ludwig

- Theatrical release poster
- Directed by: Edward Ludwig
- Screenplay by: Wallace Smith; Eve Greene
- Story by: Oliver H.P. Garrett
- Produced by: B. P. Schulberg
- Starring: Gail Patrick; Ricardo Cortez; Akim Tamiroff; Tom Brown; Louis Calhern; June Martel
- Cinematography: Leon Shamroy
- Edited by: Robert Bischoff
- Music by: Score: Gregory Stone; Songs: Burton Lane (music); Ralph Freed (lyrics)
- Production company: Paramount Pictures
- Distributed by: Paramount Pictures
- Release date: March 13, 1937
- Running time: 74 minutes
- Country: United States
- Language: English

Her Husband Lies is a 1937 American drama film directed by Edward Ludwig and written by Wallace Smith and Eve Greene. The film stars Gail Patrick, Ricardo Cortez, Akim Tamiroff, Tom Brown, Louis Calhern and June Martel. The film was released on March 13, 1937, by Paramount Pictures.

== Cast ==
- Gail Patrick as Natalie Martin
- Ricardo Cortez as J. Ward Thomas
- Akim Tamiroff as Big Ed Bullock
- Tom Brown as 'Chick' Thomas
- Louis Calhern as Joe Sorrell
- June Martel as Betty Thomas
- Dorothy Peterson as Dorothy Powell
- Ralf Harolde as Steve Burdick
- Adrian Morris as Carwig
- Ray Walker as Maxie
- Jack La Rue as Trigger
- Bradley Page as Pug
- Paul Fix as Lefty Harker
