= Nevada City =

Nevada City may refer to:

- Nevada City, California, USA
- Nevada City, Montana, USA
- Nevada City, Nevada, USA
- Nevada City (film), a 1941 film directed by Joseph Kane

== See also ==
- Nevada (disambiguation)
