= Fighting Youth =

1935 film by Hamilton MacFadden

- Directed by: Hamilton MacFadden
- Screenplay by: Henry Johnson; Hamilton MacFadden; Florabel Muir
- Story by: Stanley Meyer
- Produced by: Fred S. Meyer
- Starring: Charles Farrell; June Martel; Andy Devine; J. Farrell MacDonald; Ann Sheridan; Edward Nugent
- Cinematography: Edward Snyder
- Edited by: Bernard W. Burton
- Production company: Universal Pictures
- Distributed by: Universal Pictures
- Release date: November 1, 1935
- Running time: 85 minutes
- Country: United States
- Language: English

Fighting Youth is a 1935 American drama film directed by Hamilton MacFadden and written by Henry Johnson, Hamilton MacFadden and newspaper reporter Florabel Muir. The film stars Charles Farrell, June Martel, Andy Devine, J. Farrell MacDonald, Ann Sheridan and Edward Nugent. The film was released on November 1, 1935, by Universal Pictures.

== Plot ==
A radical campus group persuades student Carol Arlington to lead a protest of a college's football team. She manages to recruit Larry Davis, even though he is a star player for State's team.

Larry needs money to marry sweetheart Betty Wilson, but needs a job. Carol and the committee protest that the school is using its athletes to make a profit. A distracted Larry fumbles in the next game and is kicked off the team by Coach Parker, who is offended by Larry's campus activities.

With some asserting that Larry lost the game on purpose, a campus radical, Tony Tonetti, turns out to be an undercover agent investigating troublemakers trying to infiltrate the campus and influence the students. Larry is left out of the big season-ending game until the very end, when Parker has a change of heart, lets him play and ends up victorious.

== Cast ==
- Charles Farrell as Larry Davis
- June Martel as Betty Wilson
- Andy Devine as Cy Kipp
- J. Farrell MacDonald as Coach Parker
- Ann Sheridan as Carol Arlington
- Edward Nugent as Anthony Tonnetti
- Herman Bing as Luigi
- Phyllis Fraser as Dodo Gates
- Stephen Chase as Louis Markoff
- Jim Purvis as Football Player from Purdue
- Paul Schwegler as Football Player from University of Washington
- Leslie Cooper as Football Player from Minnesota
- Howard Christie as Cadet Christie from University of California
- Frank Sully as Football Player from St. Louis
- Glen Boles as Paul
- Murray Kinnell as Dean James Churchill
- David Worth as Football Captain Blake
- Jeff Cravath as Assistant Coach
- Charles C. Wilson as Bull Stevens
- Walter Johnson as Buck
- Jean Rogers as Blonde Student
- Clara Kimball Young as Mrs. Stewart
- Ralph Brooks as Football Player
- Robert Hale as Student
- Dell Henderson as Detective
- Russell Wade as Buck's Roommate
- John 'Dusty' King as Singing Band Leader

== See also ==
- List of American football films
