= Arizona Mahoney =

1936 film by James P. Hogan

- Theatrical release poster
- Directed by: James P. Hogan
- Screenplay by: Stuart Anthony; Robert Yost
- Based on: "Stairs of Sand" by Zane Grey
- Produced by: A.M. Botsford
- Starring: Joe Cook; Robert Cummings; June Martel; Buster Crabbe; Marjorie Gateson; John Miljan
- Cinematography: George T. Clemens
- Production company: Paramount Pictures
- Distributed by: Paramount Pictures
- Release date: December 4, 1936
- Running time: 58 minutes
- Country: United States
- Language: English

Arizona Mahoney is a 1936 American comedy western film directed by James P. Hogan and written by Stuart Anthony and Robert Yost. The film stars Joe Cook, Robert Cummings, June Martel, Buster Crabbe, Marjorie Gateson and John Miljan. It is based on the short story "Stairs of Sand" by Zane Grey. The film was released on December 4, 1936, by Paramount Pictures.

== Plot ==
When Sue Bixby becomes his new boss, stagecoach robber Talbot reforms and goes after her rustled cattle. When he and his men are outnumbered fighting Lloyd's gang, Randall rides to get circus man Mahoney and his man shooting cannon.

== Cast ==
- Joe Cook as Arizona Mahoney
- Robert Cummings as Phillip Randall
- June Martel as Sue Beatrice Bixby
- Buster Crabbe as Kirby Talbot
- Marjorie Gateson as Safroney Jones
- John Miljan as Cameron Lloyd
- Dave Chasen as Flit Smith
- Irving Bacon as Smokey
- Richard Carle as Sheriff
- Billy Lee as Kid
- Fred Kohler as Gil Blair
- James P. Burtis as Terry
- Frank Mayo as Lefty
- Paul Newlan as Boots

== Production ==
Cummings played the romantic lead. The film was mostly shot on location in Big Bear in November 1936.
