= Dvaravati sila =

Sacred stone in Hinduism

A dvaravati shila (Sanskrit: द्वारवती शिला, romanized: dvāravatī śilā) is a type of coral stone (shaligrama) obtained from the Gomti river in Dwarka in Gujarat, India. In ancient Sanskrit literature, Dvaraka was called Dvaravati and was listed as one of the seven prehistoric cities in the country.

Indian art overwhelmingly prefers the iconic image, but some aniconism does occur in folk worship, in early Hinduism in the form of Vishnu's shaligrama (fossil stone), dvaravati shilas (coral stone), and the Govardhana shilas (stone from the Govardhan hill). They have solar significance, and their use in worship is very common among all sects of Vaishnavites of Hinduism.

== Dvaraka ==
The legendary city of Dvaraka in Hindu history was the dwelling place of Krishna. Dwarka or Dvaraka is derived from 'Dwar', a door, and in ancient times its flourishing port was considered to be the gateway to the main land. As 'Ka' means 'Brahma' meaning gateway to Moksha (salvation). It is also called Dwarkamati and Dwarkavati or Dvaravati. The famous Nageswar Jyotirlinga near Dwaraka is made of a large Dvaraka Sila.

The Hindu scriptures prescribe that stones obtained from Dvaraka only for worship even though geologically it may be found in other places too.

== Scriptural sanctions ==
There are several schools of thought among the learned acharyas of the Vaishnava sect on the worship of this Sila. This Sila is worshipped, along with or independent of Sila (murthi) or Saligrama Sila, in some parts of the country (among Vaishnavites of Saurashtra, Bengal and Maharashtra; the Madhva sect in Karnataka), particularly in the Vaishnava tradition. It is worshipped along with the Sila| Saligrama Sila (stone) since scriptures consider it auspicious to do so. According to Skanda Purana, wherever Dvaraka Sila is placed in front of the Sila|, every class of magnificence goes on increasing unlimitedly. Skanda Purana also says that one who daily worships Dvaraka Sila along with twelve Saligrama Silas will be honored even in Vaikuntha.

=== Traits ===
The chakra-mark is the most distinguishing feature of the Dvaravati stones, and hence they are called "chakrankita-sila". According to Garuda Purana, there are twelve varieties of this stone, owing to the number of chakras (wheels), colours and forms (Sanskrit sloka in this regard states:‘dasadha cha prabhinnas ta varnakrti-vibhedatah’). When there is only one chakra, the stone is called Devesa; when there are two chakras, it is Sudarshana; three chakras represent the deity Ananta. When there are four chakras, the stone is Janardana. Vasudeva is represented by the stone having five chakras, Pradyumna by six chakras, Bala-bhadra by seven, Purushottama by eight, Nava-vyuha by nine, Dasavatara by ten, Aniruddha by eleven and Dvadastma by twelve. Nava-vyuha represents the collection of nine forms of Vishnu: Vasudeva, Samkarshana, Pradyumna, Aniruddha, Narayana, Hayagriva, Vishnu, Nrsimha and Varaha. The first four forms are well known as ‘chatur-vyuha’. The twelve major forms of Vishnu are derived from these nine forms, according to the Tantra siddhanta, a division of Pancharatra.

Prahlada Samhita, quoted in Salagrama-pariksha (by Anupasimha) gives the first few names differently. The Dvaravati Sila with only one chakra is called Sudarsana, with two chakras 'Lakshmi-narayana' and with three chkras 'Trivikrama'. The rest of the names are the same as given above. The name Ananta is given to stones which have more than twelve chakras. The name for Dasavatara in the above list is given here as 'Dasamurti'. When the chakras are more than twelve, only even numbered chakras are to be preferred, according to Galava-smrtir.

== See also ==
- Murti
