= Guru Narasimha Temple, Saligrama =

Guru Narasimha temple
- Location within Karnataka

Religion
- Affiliation: Hinduism
- District: Udupi District
- Deity: Narasimha as Srimad Yogananda Guru Narasimha
- Festival: Narasimha Jayanti

Location
- Location: Saligrama
- State: Karnataka
- Country: India
- Interactive map of Guru Narasimha temple
- Coordinates: 13°29′55″N 74°42′42″E

The Guru Narasimha Temple, Saligrama is a Hindu temple dedicated to Narasimha, the lion-headed form of Vishnu. Srimad Yogananda Guru Narasimha is the chief deity of the town of Saligrama, Udupi, Karnataka, India.

The main image of Narashima, lion-faced and two-handed, is dated to the 8th century. The temple of Guru Narasimha is located on NH 66 at a distance of 22 km from Udupi City.

== Kshetra Purana (Significance of the history of the place) ==
The 'Sri Saligrama Kshetra Mahatmyam' of the Pushkara khanda of the Padma Purana, the Sahyadri khanda of the Skanda Purana and the Lokadityapaddati provide the details of the significance of this temple.

- According to the Padma Purana, the deity of Guru Narasimha appeared at the bottom of a pipal tree holding Shankha(conch) and Chakra(disc) in its hands. Narada muni who had heard this through an akashavani (celestial message) installed the deity of Guru Narasimha. The akashavani described the deity as 'Yogananda Nrusimhakyam'.
- According to the Sahyadri khanda of the Skanda Purana, Lokaditya, the son of Mayura Varma of the Kadamba Dynasty came along with his army and a group of Brahmins headed by a great man called Bhattacharya. The priests performed mahayagas like Poundra, Atiratra etc. on the request of the king. The blessings of Mahaganapati had been invoked at the start of the yagnas. Ganapathi appeared in the dreams of Bhattacharya with 10 hands and told him to re-install the deity of Lord Yogananda Narasimha and from henceforth Narasimha himself shall be the Guru and god for the Brahmins of the 14 villages surrounding the temple.

To this day, the Brahmins of these 14 villages, known as Kota Brahmins follow Guru Narasimha as their sole Guru.

== Characteristics of the Deity ==
- The Deity of Guru Narasimha is entirely made of the sacred Saligrama stone. The Deity itself was never carved by anyone, but is "Swayambhu". The name of the place "Saligrama" owns to this legend.
- The Deity has a Shankha(conch) in one hand and a Chakra(disc) in another. It is seated in a yogic posture attributing to the name "Yogananda Guru Narasimha".
- The Deity is seated on a Mahaganapati yantra. The reason for this is that, Bhattacharya witnessed that in this place lions and elephants lived in harmony, which is quite contradictory to their nature. As a result, he called this place as "Nirvairya sthala" meaning "the place of no enmity".
- The Deity faces west and 2 ponds are located on either sides of its hands, namely, the Shanka Teertha and the Chakra Teertha.
- There is a crack in the top portion of the Deity. The story behind this is that-

Earlier, the deity of Guru Narasimha was facing east. Because of the "Ugra" nature of Narasimha, the crops facing the direction of the eyesight of the deity used to get burned to ashes. An angry Brahmin once struck the Lord with a plough, and hence a scar was formed on the deity. It is deemed that the person who struck the deity faced a lot of problems later on in his life. Several citations from the Shilpa Shastra can be used to prove that the deity was once facing east.

== Guru Narasimha as an ensurer of law ==
Until 1950, it was a common practice to swear in front of the Lord after following a set of rituals. If a person wished to swear in front of the Lord in a court case, the person would be allowed to do so in the presence of the judge, who himself would come down to the temple. The person wishing to swear in front of the Lord would have to take a dip in both Teerthas, wear wet clothes, and enter the temple from the side door. Then he would be required to ring 2 pramana bells near the main entrance, stand in front of the garbha gudi, light 6 lamps, swear in front of the Lord, blow out the lamps, and repeat these 2 more times.

== Temple structure ==
- In 1970 a new Garbha Gudi, Tirtha Mantapa, shrine for the nagadevaru, dvajasthamba and other renovations were made to the temple.
- In 1996 an Ashtamangala Prashna was carried out in the temple and the errors found were corrected in stages.
- In 1997 the Shanka Theertha was cleaned, and its surroundings were renovated.
- In 1998 the old temple doors were replaced with new concrete ones.
- In 2003 the present Swagata Gopura was constructed.

=== Anjaneya swami temple ===
Outside the temple, there is also an idol of Anjaneya Swami that faces Guru Narsimha's line of sight. This idol was installed there to reduce the "Ugra" nature of the Lord and hence stop the burning of crops. The idol is smeared with sindhura and butter in order to reduce the burning effect due to Guru Narasimha's sight.

It is a practice for tourists travelling long distances to stop in front of the Anjaneya Swami temple and offer kanike to the deity and only then pass on in order to ensure that they reach their destination safely. Rangapuja is carried out in this shrine throughout the year in the evenings.

=== Mahaganapathi ===
Bhattacharya, who installed the Guru Narasimha idol, also installed the deity Mahaganapati. Legend says that Mahaganapathi appeared with ten arms in Bhattacharya's dreams and gave him instructions. As a result, the deity that Bhattacharya installed is a "dashabhuja" Ganapathi. The presence of Narasimha and Ganapathi also serves as a reminder that elephants and lions once lived in harmony in this place. Puja is carried out every day for the deity.

=== Durga Parameshwari ===
The idol of Sri Durga Parameshwari is located to the right of the garbha griha of Guru Narasimha and exactly opposite to the shrine of Mahaganapathi. Here too puja is performed to the deity on a regular basis.

== Narasimha as the guru ==
It is a traditional practice for a class of Brahmins to be associated to some Matha usually established by great acharyas like Adi Shankara, Ramanuja, Madhvacharya, etc. However, the Kota Brahmins of the 14 villages surrounding the Saligrama temple do not have any human gurus. Instead Lord Vishnu himself in the form of Narasimha is their guru. The Brahmins themselves did not disconnect from any matha and adopt Narasimha as their guru. It was Ganapathi who appeared in the dreams of Bhattacharya who told him to gather the Brahmins of the 14 villages surrounding the Guru Narasimha temple and inform them that from henceforth only Guru Narasimha shall be their guru. Also, this incident took place even before the time of the 1st Brahmin guru Adi Shankara was born.
Although the Brahmins of these 14 villages did not accept Adi Shankara as their guru formally when he toured this place, they completely accepted the Advaita vedanta as propagated by him. They too belong to the Smartha category of Brahmins with the exception that their guru is Guru Narasimha and not Adi Shankara.
It is mandatory for them to keep aside a guru kanike before conducting rituals like Upanayana, marriage, etc.

These villages surround the temple:

- Airody
- Balekudru or Hangarukate
- Chtrapady
- Giliyaru
- Gundmi
- Handattu
- Karkada
- Kotathattu
- Mannooru
- Pandeshwara
- Paramapalli
- Vaddarse

== Important sevas and festivals ==
- It is a practice by the Brahmins of the 14 villages to perform the mooduganapathi seva for the Lord in the tulaamaasa sankramana for providing proper rain and hence proper harvest. Later a feast is organised using the rice collected during this time.
- 120 coconut ganahoma to the Mahaganapathi deity during Ganesh Chaturthi.
- Ratharohana during Uttarayana sankranthis(16 January).
- Chandika Parayana for Durga Parameshwari during Navaratri.
- Hanuma Jayanthi.
- Narasimha Jayanti.
- Car festival during makara maasa.
