= June Martel =

American singer and actress (1909–1978)

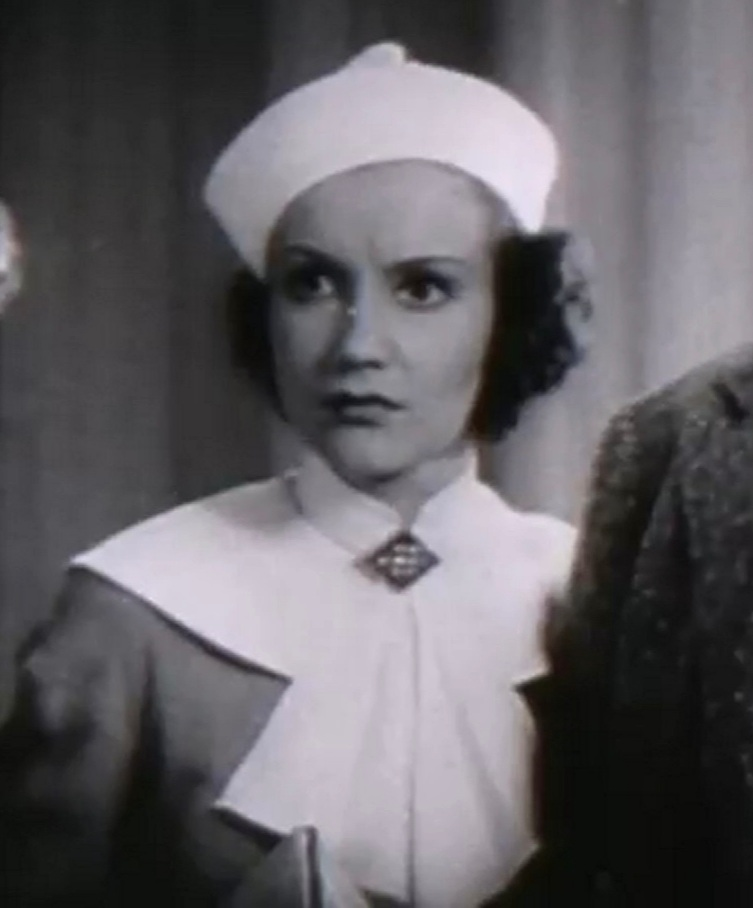
- Martel in Going Highbrow (1935)
- Born: Martha Irene Greif; November 19, 1909; Chicago, Illinois, U.S.
- Died: November 23, 1978 (aged 69); Los Angeles County, California, U.S.
- Occupations: Singer; actress
- Years active: 1938–1938
- Spouse(s): Walter Joseph Klavun (m. 1931; div. 1938) Frank Fenton (m. 1941; div. 19??)

June Martel (born Martha Irene Greif; November 19, 1909 – November 23, 1978) was a singer and a stage and movie actress from Chicago, Illinois. She was a petite brunette.

== Singer and actress ==
Her career began as a singer in Atlantic City, New Jersey. Martel was in the cast of the Broadway play Snatch as Snatch Can in May 1934. Other actors paired with her included Barton MacLane. Her first film role was in Front Page Woman (1935), followed by Going Highbrow (1935). She was the female lead in Fighting Youth (1935). The movie combined football excitement with the influence of communism on college athletics.

Martel was signed by Harry Warner of Warner Bros. in 1935. Other aspiring Warners' actresses were Olivia de Havilland, June Grabiner, Nan Grey, and Dorothy Dare. By August 1936, she had become the property of Paramount Pictures. The studio cast her as the ingenue in American Plan. The story concerned a girl who inherits a newspaper, adapted from an unpublished play by Manny Seff and Milton Lazarus. She also appeared in Sitting on the Moon in 1936.

Martel's later screen roles came in the 1930s in western films, such as Forlorn River (1937), Wild Horse Rodeo (1937) and Santa Fe Stampede (1938).

== Personal life ==
She collected odd pieces of jewelry and had amassed a small trunkload of items by 1937. In February 1941 Martel married screenwriter Frank Fenton. Fenton was also a scenarist and magazine writer. Her first husband was Walter J. Klavun, whom she divorced in Mexico in 1938.

June Martel died in 1978 in Los Angeles County, California.

== Filmography ==
Year	Title	Role	Notes
1935	Going Highbrow	Sandy	
1935	Front Page Woman	Olive Wilson	
1935	Waterfront Lady	Chorus Girl	uncredited
1935	Dr. Socrates	Young Woman	uncredited
1935	Fighting Youth	Betty Wilson	
1936	Sitting on the Moon	Young Wife	
1936	Arizona Mahoney	Sue Beatrice Bixby	
1937	Her Husband Lies	Betty Thomas	
1937	Night of Mystery	Barton	
1937	Forlorn River	Ina Blaine	
1937	Wild Horse Rodeo	Alice Harkley	
1938	Santa Fe Stampede	Nancy Carson	
