= Nevada Township =

Nevada Township may refer to:

- Nevada Township, Livingston County, Illinois
- Nevada Township, Palo Alto County, Iowa
- Nevada Township, Mower County, Minnesota

== See also ==
- Nevada (disambiguation)
