= Santa Fe Stampede =

1938 film

- Theatrical poster
- Directed by: George Sherman
- Screenplay by: Luci Ward; Betty Burbridge
- Based on: Based on characters by William Colt MacDonald
- Produced by: William A. Berke
- Starring: John Wayne; Ray Corrigan; Max Terhune
- Cinematography: Reggie Lanning
- Edited by: Tony Martinelli
- Production company: Republic Pictures
- Distributed by: Republic Pictures
- Release date: November 18, 1938
- Running time: 55 minutes
- Country: United States
- Language: English

Santa Fe Stampede is a 1938 American "Three Mesquiteers" Western film directed by George Sherman and starring John Wayne, Ray Corrigan, and Max Terhune. Wayne played the lead in eight of the fifty-one films in the popular series.

== Plot ==
The Mesquiteers, Stony Brook, Tucson Smith and Lullaby Joslin, re-unite with an old friend, Dave Carson, who is prospecting near Santa Fe Junction. They meet Dave's youngest kids, Billy and JulieJane. JulieJane is immediately infatuated with Stony Brooke. They also re-unite with Dave's older daughter, Nancy, who has grown into a pretty young woman. Dave informs the trio of his success in finding gold on his land, but he is reluctant to file a claim on it because it would inform the town mayor, whom he does not trust.

After chasing two trespassers from Dave's property, the Mesquiteers catch one, but one escapes. He reports to the mayor, who now knows that Dave has found gold on his land. The trio attempt to put the man they caught into the town jail but are told they cannot do it without a court order signed by judge Hixon. As soon as Hixon signs, the mayor insists on the trial starting immediately. The trial is a farce with the judge meekly accepting false witness from one of the mayor's men. When the Mesquiteers speak up the judge fines them each $100.

Having seen how bad things are in town, Stony suggests to the townspeople that they file a petition of appeal to the territorial governor to have the mayor recalled. When Stony, Dave and JulieJane set off on a buckboard to take the petition to the capital city, the judge warns the mayor who sends two henchmen to get the petition and for one of them to then go on to Placerburg to file a claim for the gold mine in the mayor's name. The judge is concerned that JulieJane might get hurt. When the trio stop to get ranchers Carey and Franklin to sign the petition, Stony leaves to file the claim for Dave. The chase the buckboard eventually shooting Dave who loses control and crashes, with both Dave and JulieJane being killed.

When the mayor finds out Stony filed for the claim first, his lawyer suggests they frame Stony for the murders. The US Marshal who arrives to arrest Stony is an old friend, Jim Wood. Stony suspects he wouldn't survive until the trial, but Jim says he'll help. Tucson and Lullaby arrive, and Jim deputizes them to look after Stony. When the sheriff arrives to take Stony, Jim, Tucson and Lullaby go with him, to the sheriff's consternation. Jim does not trust the judge and tells him so. When he and Stony send Tucson and Lullaby to fetch Carey and Franklin, who can give Stony a good alibi, the mayor sends some henchmen to shoot Carey and Franklin before Tucson and Lullaby can get to them. The mayor sends hi men to work up the townspeople into a mob, and they demand that Stony be strung up with a rope. Jim tries to send a message for help, but the telegraph operator is one of the mayor's men and passes it on the mayor instead of sending it. shortly after Jim tries again, standing over him to make sure he sends it.

In the meantime, Tucson and Lullaby have been ambushed and are being held in a shack by two more of the mayor's henchmen. When Billy is told they are missing he goes to find them. He manages to rescue them and then Carey and Franklin arrive. All five of them race back to town to help rescue Stony. Back in town, the Marshal tries to hold off the mob from breaking into the jail. He gives the jail cell keys to Nancy and tells her to let Stony out. Before she can get to the cell, she is knocked unconscious by a rock thrown through the window by the mob. The mob then starts to burn down the jailhouse. With the jail on fire, the mob then starts throwing sticks of dynamite at the jail. Stony finally gets the keys from a still unconscious Nancy and manages to save her and himself by going out the back wall which has been blown out by the dynamite.

Tucson and Lullaby find Stony holding the mayor, the judge, and several henchmen at gunpoint. The judge no longer agrees to cover for the mayor, and it is revealed that the judge sent a telegraph wire to the authorities, so the mayor shoots him. There follows a fight which the Mesquiteers win.

The Mesquiteers say their goodbyes to Nancy and Billy and promise to return soon with machinery for the mine.

== Cast ==
- John Wayne as Stony Brooke
- Ray Corrigan as Tucson Smith
- Max Terhune as Lullaby Joslin
- Elmer as Elmer (Lullaby Joslin's Ventriloquist Dummy) (uncredited)
- June Martel as Nancy Carson
- William Farnum as Dave Carson
- LeRoy Mason as Mayor Gil Byron
- Martin Spellman as Billy Carson
- Genee Hall as Julie Jane Carson
- Walter Wills as Lawyer Harris
- Ferris Taylor as Judge Henry J. Hixon
- Tom London as Marshal Jim Wood
- Dick Rush as Sheriff Tom
- James Cassidy as Jed Newton
- Richard Alexander as Joe Moffit (Henchman) (uncredited)

== Reception ==
Frank S. Nugent of The New York Times wrote that the Three Mesquiteers' success was "probably due to the fact that nobody has thought of ambushing them with a Flit gun".

== See also ==
- John Wayne filmography
