= Nevada County =

Nevada County is the name of two counties in the United States:

- Nevada County, Arkansas
- Nevada County, California

== See also ==
- List of counties in Nevada
- Nevada (disambiguation)
