= Sierra Nevada (disambiguation) =

The Sierra Nevada is a mountain range in the Western United States.

Sierra Nevada may also refer to:

== Places ==
=== Mountain ranges ===
- Sierra Nevada (Spain), in southern Spain
- Sierra Nevada, the Trans-Mexican Volcanic Belt, in central-southern Mexico
- Sierra Nevada de Lagunas Bravas, a volcanic complex in Chile and Argentina
- Sierra Nevada de Mérida, in Venezuela
- Sierra Nevada de Santa Marta, in Colombia
- Sierra Nevada del Cocuy, another mountain range in Colombia

=== Other locations ===
- Sierra Nevada (stratovolcano), a volcano in Chile
- Sierra Nevada National Park (Spain)
- Sierra Nevada National Park (Venezuela)
- Sierra Nevada Ski Station, a ski resort in Spain

== Other uses ==
- Sierra Nevada (ferry), a ferry operated on San Francisco Bay
- macOS Sierra, version 10.12 of the macOS operating system
- Sierra Nevada Brewing Company, a California beer brewer
- Sierra Nevada Corporation, an aerospace contractor
- Sierra Nevada affair, corruption scandal in Venezuela

== See also ==
- Sieranevada, 2016 Romanian film
- Nevada (disambiguation)
- Sierra (disambiguation)
