= Forlorn River (1937 film) =

1937 film by Charles Barton, Harold Hurley

- Theatrical release poster
- Directed by: Charles Barton
- Screenplay by: Stuart Anthony; Robert Yost
- Based on: Forlorn River by Zane Grey
- Produced by: Harold Hurley (uncredited)
- Starring: Buster Crabbe; June Martel; Harvey Stephens
- Cinematography: Harry Hallenberger
- Edited by: John F. Link Sr.
- Music by: Boris Morros
- Distributed by: Paramount Pictures
- Release date: July 2, 1937 (USA)
- Running time: 56 minutes
- Country: United States
- Language: English

Forlorn River is a 1937 American Western film directed by Charles Barton and starring Buster Crabbe, June Martel, and Harvey Stephens. Based on the 1927 novel of the same name by Zane Grey.

== Plot ==
A cowboy name Nevada takes a job on a ranch rounding up horses. He comes into conflict with a powerful cattleman and former bankrobber.

== Cast ==
- Buster Crabbe as Jim Lacey aka Nevada
- June Martel as Ina Blaine
- Harvey Stephens as Les Setter
- John Patterson as Ben Ide
- Syd Saylor as "Weary" Pierce
- William Duncan as Blaine
- Ray Bennett as Henchman Bill
- Ruth Warren as Millie the cook
- Lew Kelly as Sheriff Jim Henry
- Chester Conklin as Sheriff Alec Grundy
- Barlowe Borland as "Dad", the Bank Cashier
- Larry Lawrence as Ed
- Lee Powell as Henchman Duke
- Oscar 'Dutch' Hendrian as Sam
