= Nevada (1927 film) =

1927 film

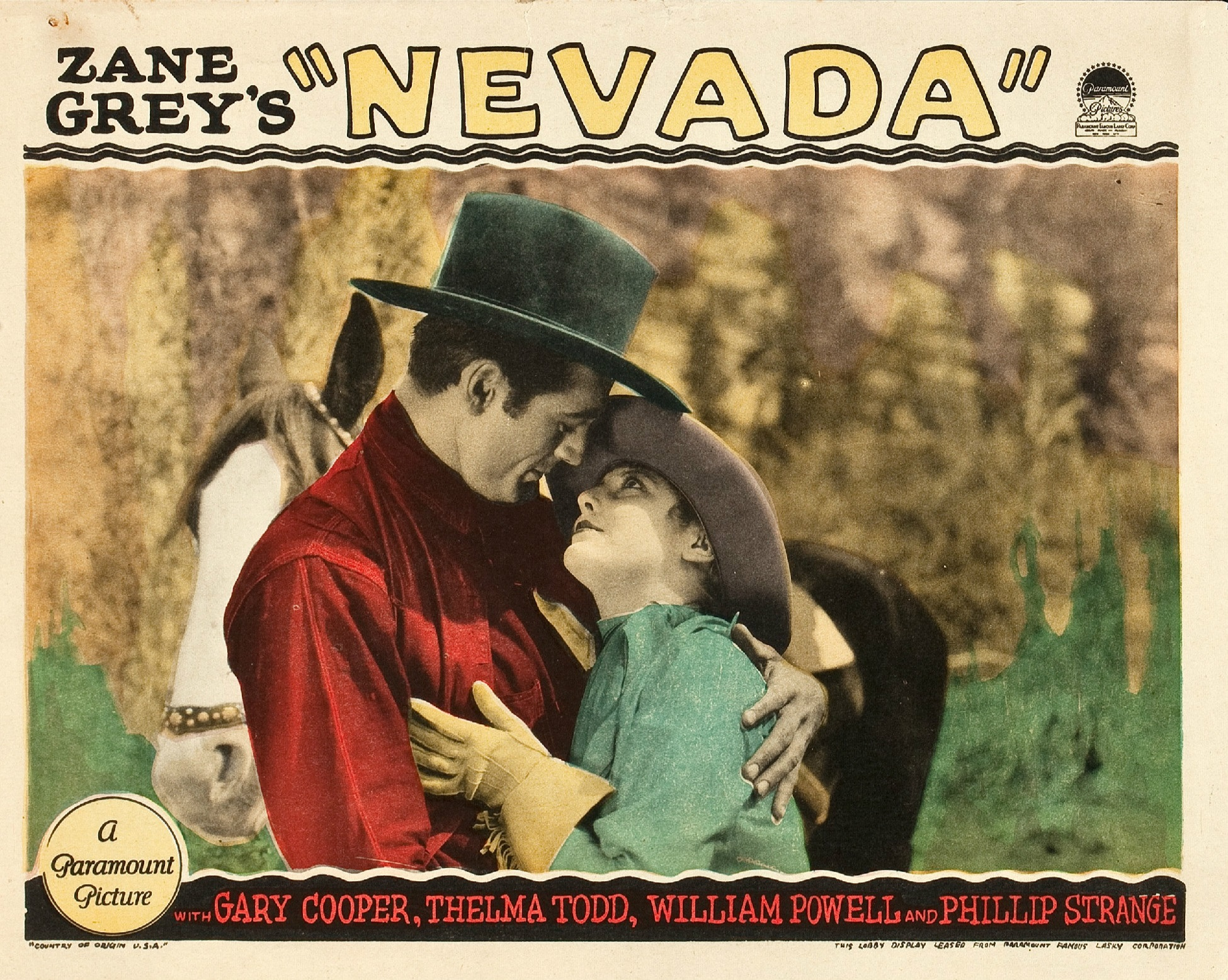
- Lobby card
- Directed by: John Waters
- Written by: Gordon Rigby; John Stone; John W. Conway (intertitles)
- Based on: Nevada by Zane Grey
- Produced by: Jesse L. Lasky; Adolph Zukor
- Starring: Gary Cooper; Thelma Todd; William Powell
- Cinematography: Charles Edgar Schoenbaum
- Production company: Paramount Famous Lasky Corporation
- Distributed by: Paramount Pictures
- Release date: August 1, 1927 (USA)
- Running time: 7 reels, 6,258 ft
- Country: United States
- Languages: Silent; English intertitles

Full film

Nevada is a 1927 American silent Western film directed by John Waters and starring Gary Cooper, Thelma Todd, and William Powell. Based on the novel Nevada by Zane Grey, the film is about a former outlaw hired to protect a ranch owner's sister, which angers the ranch foreman who is in love with the girl. The villainous foreman spreads a rumor of his rival's dark past to the sheriff, and the former outlaw is soon on the run again. Eventually he captures a gang of cattle rustlers led by the foreman, and with his reputation restored, he marries the girl. This lavish Western film was remade in 1944 as a B movie version titled Nevada starring Robert Mitchum—the only time Cooper and Mitchum played the same role; the remake was so early in Mitchum's career that he was billed with "Introducing Bob Mitchum as Jim Lacy."

Nevada still survives in a complete copy, but the film's appearance is not the best, due probably to poor preservation. It is possible to make out scenes, but not as well as other highly restored silent films. This was a very early Western role for Gary Cooper, but his fame in Westerns would be more noticeable in talking pictures. The film's copyright was not renewed, and therefore went into the public domain on January 1, 2023.

== Plot ==
A feared gunfighter named Nevada breaks his friend Cash Burridge from the Lineville jail. When they reach the town of Winthrop, the two men decide to take respectable jobs on a ranch owned by Ben Ide, an Englishman they rescued from Cawthorne's gang of cattle rustlers. Fearing the rustlers, Ide hires Nevada to protect his sister, Hettie, angering the ranch foreman, Clan Dillon, who is in love with Hettie.

The villainous foreman spreads a rumor of his rival's dark past to the sheriff, and soon Nevada and Cash join up with Cawthorne's gang in order to escape the sheriff. Unknown to Nevada, Cawthorne's gang takes its orders from Dillon, who is the leader of the rustlers. During a raid, Dillon shoots both Cash and Cawthorne, but Nevada learns of his treachery from his dying pal. Later in a confrontation, Nevada is wounded by Dillon but is saved by the arrival of the posse and the evidence given by the wounded Cawthorne against the leader. With his reputation restored, Nevada is free to marry Hettie.

== Cast ==
- Gary Cooper as Nevada
- Thelma Todd as Hettie Ide
- William Powell as Clan Dillon
- Philip Strange as Ben Ide
- Ernie Adams as Cash Burridge
- Christian J. Frank as Sheriff of Winthrop
- Ivan Christy as Cawthorne
- Guy Oliver as Lineville Sheriff
- Jim Corey as Bearded Henchman (uncredited)

== Production ==
Parts of the film were shot in Zion National Park, Bryce Canyon, and Cedar Breaks National Monument.

== Remakes ==
The picture was remade in 1935 with Buster Crabbe as Nevada and again in 1944 with Robert Mitchum in the same part, a well-received film in which Mitchum was "introduced" as "Bob Mitchum" (it was his first leading role but he'd appeared in smaller parts in earlier films). The latter picture represents the only time that Cooper and Mitchum played the same role in two different movies based upon the same story.

== Preservation ==
Copies of Nevada survive and are held at the Library of Congress and George Eastman House Motion Picture Collection.
