= Supershow Nevada =

Bulgarian television quiz show

Supershow Nevada (Bulgarian: "Супершоу Невада"), renamed Show Taxi (Bulgarian: Шоу "Такси") in 1996, was a popular Bulgarian quiz programme. It was the first Bulgarian major quiz show on television. The show was one of the two most popular show games on the 1990s Bulgarian TV (the other being the Risk Pecheli, Risk Gubi (Risk Win Risk Lose) show). It remained the most popular until 2001, when it was discontinued. It was firstly hosted by Kutzi Vaptsarov, who later went to do the Risk Pecheli, Risk Gubi show, and then by Asya Stateva (Bulgarian: Ася Статева), commonly known as only Asya. The show was sponsored by Moto-Phoe, the Bulgarian representative company for Ford Motor Company, that's why the main prize was a Ford car (Ford Ka, Fiesta, Escort, Focus and Mondeo models). The winner of the previous rounds in the game had to choose a Ford car key, numbered from 1 to 10. Then they had to answer a question, attached to the key and if the answer was correct, they were allowed to try to unlock the left front door of the car. If the key matched the lock, the participant took the grand prize - a Ford car, if not - he or she had to leave the game with the money he or she had won before the final round.

== History ==
The show started broadcasting in May 1993 on BNT Channel 1 and then it moved to Efir 2. In the spring of 1996, Supershow Nevada becomes Show Taxi. After the closure of the Efir 2 channel on 31 May 2000, the show moved to Nova Television and production stopped shortly afterwards.
