= Nevada (1935 film) =

1935 film by Charles Barton

- Theatrical release poster
- Directed by: Charles Barton
- Screenplay by: Garnett Weston; Stuart Anthony
- Produced by: Harold Hurley; William T. Lackey
- Starring: Buster Crabbe; Kathleen Burke; Syd Saylor; Monte Blue; William Duncan; Richard Carle
- Cinematography: Archie Stout
- Edited by: Jack Dennis
- Production company: Paramount Pictures
- Distributed by: Paramount Pictures
- Release date: November 29, 1935
- Running time: 58 minutes
- Country: United States
- Language: English

Nevada is a 1935 American Western film directed by Charles Barton and written by Garnett Weston and Stuart Anthony. It is based on the 1928 novel Nevada by Zane Grey. The film stars Buster Crabbe, Kathleen Burke, Syd Saylor, Monte Blue, William Duncan and Richard Carle. The film was released on November 29, 1935, by Paramount Pictures.

The film's sets were designed by the art director David S. Garber.

== Cast ==
- Buster Crabbe as Jim Lacey aka 'Nevada'
- Kathleen Burke as Hettie Ide
- Syd Saylor as Cash Burridge
- Monte Blue as Clem Dillon
- William Duncan as Ben Ide
- Richard Carle as Judge Franklidge
- Frank Sheridan as Tom Blaine
- Raymond Hatton as Sheriff
- Stanley Andrews as Cawthorne
- Leif Erickson as Bill Ide
- Jack Kennedy as McTurk
- Henry Roquemore as Bartender
- William L. Thorne as Poker Player
- Harry Dunkinson as Poker Player
- Barney Furey as Bystander
- Frank Rice as Shorty
- William Desmond as Wilson
- Dutch Hendrian as Henchman

== Production ==
Filming took place in Big Bear Lake, California.
