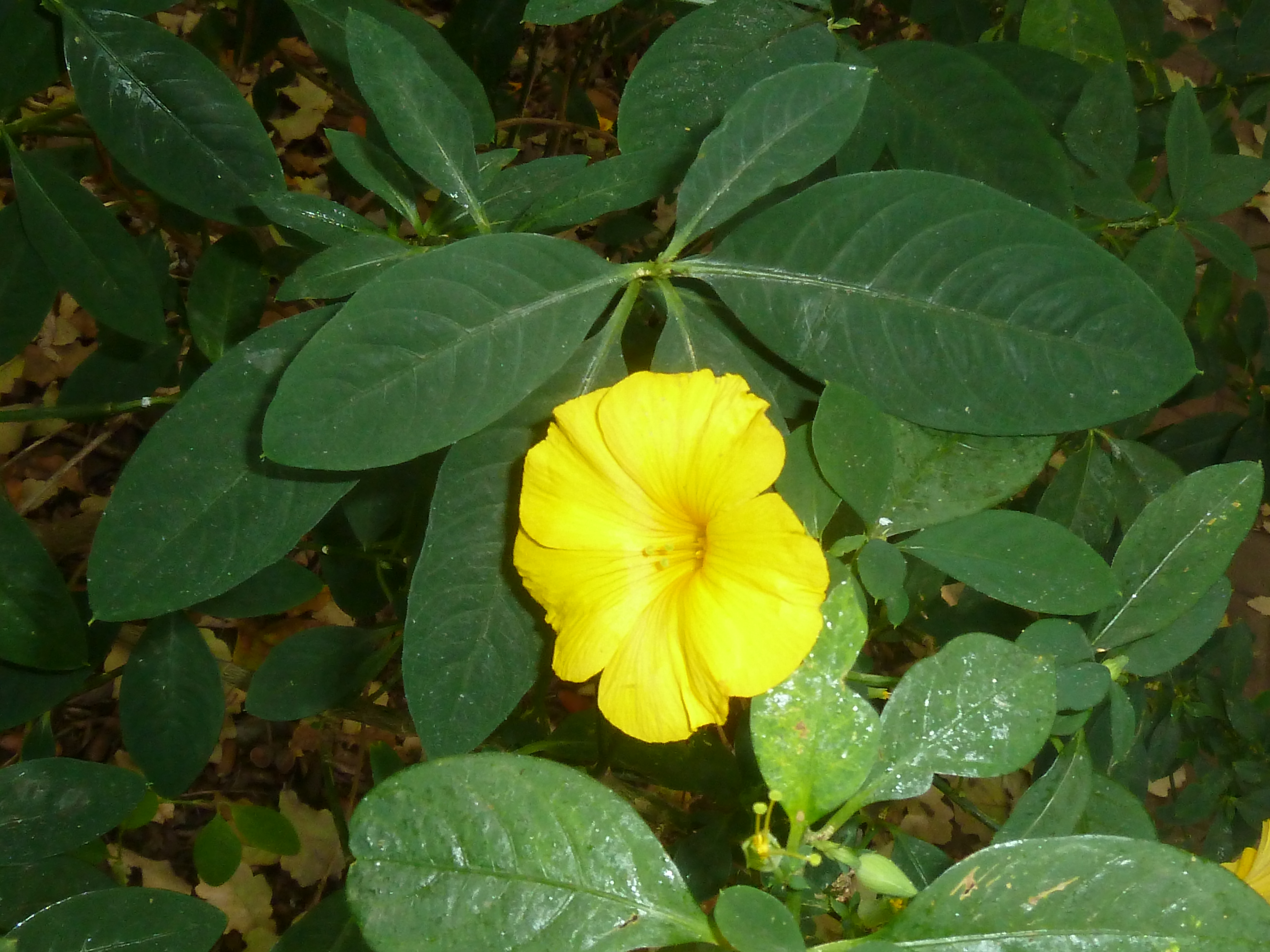
- Flower and foliage
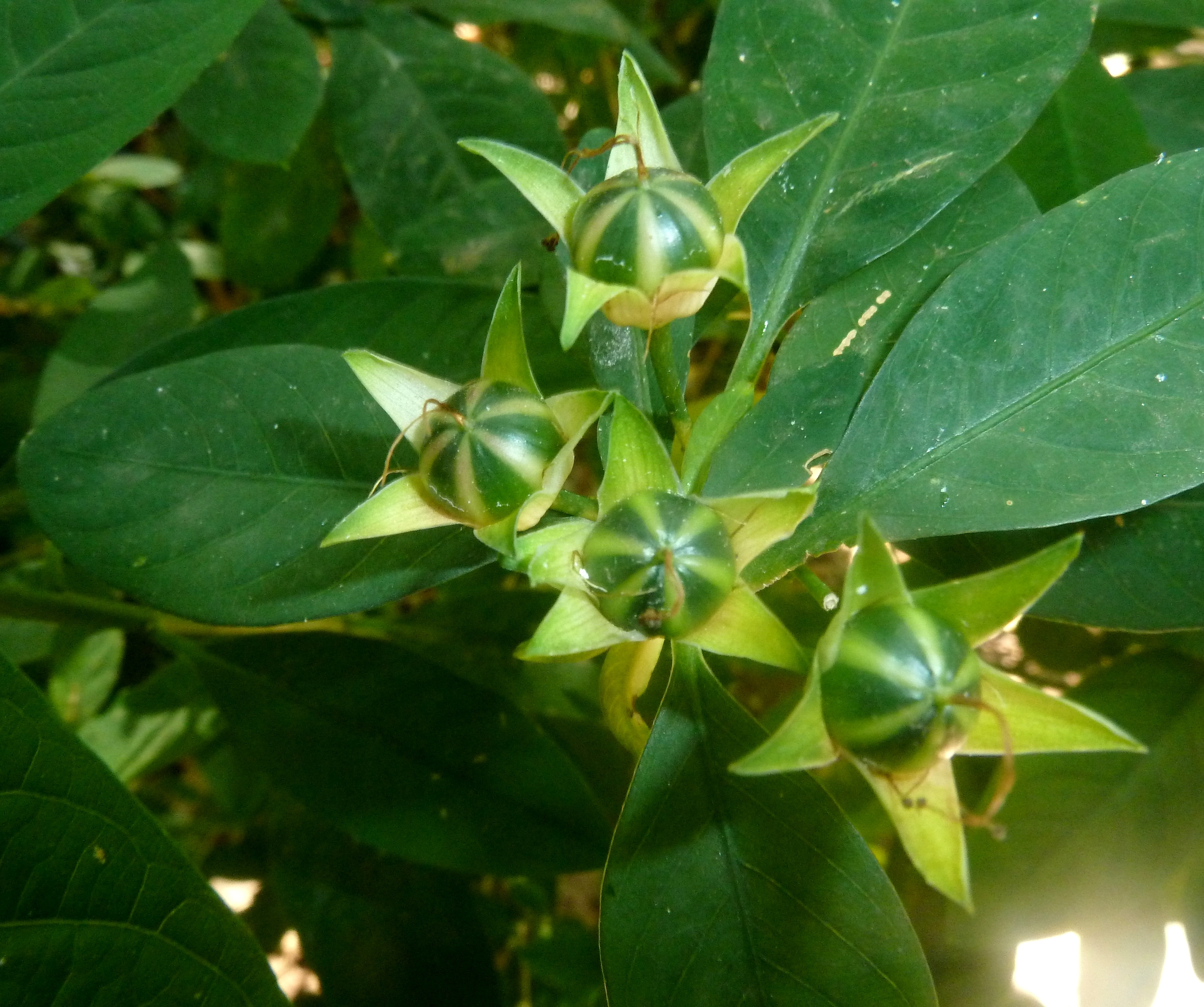
- Fruit

Scientific classification
- Kingdom: Plantae
- Clade: Embryophytes
- Clade: Tracheophytes
- Clade: Spermatophytes
- Clade: Angiosperms
- Clade: Eudicots
- Clade: Rosids
- Order: Malpighiales
- Family: Linaceae
- Subfamily: Linoideae
- Genus: Reinwardtia
- Species: R. indica

Binomial name
- Reinwardtia indica Dumort.

= Reinwardtia =

Yellow flax

Genus of plants

Reinwardtia indica, yellow flax or pyoli, is a species of Linaceae found in the Himalayas and beyond in Asia. It is the only species in the monotypic genus Reinwardtia.

== Distribution ==
This species is found in South, Southeast, and East Asia.

== Uses ==
A yellow dye made from the flowers is used for dyeing clothes and making paints.

== Culture ==
Pyoli is the subject of many folk songs.

According to Garhwali and Kumaoni folklore, Pyoli was a young maiden living in the forest. She was raised by animals and her first human contact was in the form of a prince who had lost his way during a hunting expedition. She tended him and he fell in love with her. He persuaded her to marry him and accompany him to his palace. Although she loved the prince, she started wilting in the absence of a natural environment. No one could cure her, and finally she died pining for her flora and fauna friends. Her last wish was that she should be buried among her friends. The prince took her to be buried at the place he had first met her. Some time later a pretty yellow flower came out at the spot. This flower was named after the pretty nature-loving belle.

== Taxonomy ==
The following are taxonomic synonyms for Reinwardtia indica:

R. tetragyna, R. trigyna, Linum trigynum, Linum cicanobum, Linum repens, Kittelocharis trigyna, Macrolium trigynum
