= USS Nevada =

USS Nevada may refer to:

- Neshaminy (screw frigate), built in 1865 but never commissioned, renamed Nevada in August 1869
- USS Nevada (BM-8) a monitor commissioned in 1902, renamed Tonopah in 1909, and sold in 1922
- USS Nevada (BB-36) a battleship, commissioned in 1916, served during World War II, and finally sunk for practice in 1948
- USS Nevada (SSBN-733) an Ohio-class ballistic missile submarine commissioned in 1986
