= Nawada, Uttar Pradesh =

Village in Uttar Pradesh, India

Nawada is a village situated in the Puwarka Mandal of Saharanpur District in Uttar Pradesh. The village is about 28.03 kilometres from the Mandal headquarters at Punwarka, and is located 497 kilometres from the state capital in Lucknow.

Villages nearby include Samaspur Kalan (1.2 km), Shekhpura (1.3 km), Bhatpura and Kazi Bans (2.0 km). From Nawada approx 3km far away Radha Soami satsang ghar branch available.
