= Going Highbrow =

1935 film by Robert Florey

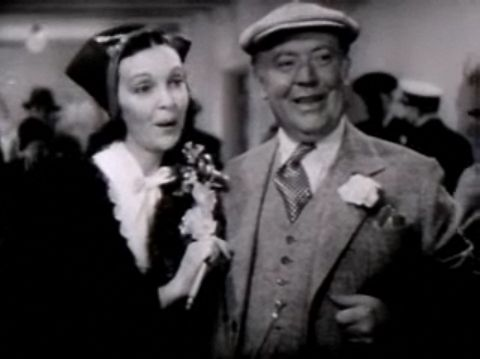
- ZaSu Pitts and Guy Kibbee
- Directed by: Robert Florey
- Written by: Edward Kaufman; Sy Bartlett; Ralph Spence; Ben Markson
- Produced by: Samuel Bischoff
- Starring: Guy Kibbee; ZaSu Pitts; Edward Everett Horton
- Cinematography: William Rees
- Edited by: Harold McLernon
- Music by: Leo F. Forbstein
- Distributed by: Warner Bros. Pictures
- Release date: August 23, 1935
- Running time: 67 minutes
- Country: United States
- Language: English

Going Highbrow is a 1935 American musical comedy film directed by Robert Florey based on the story "Social Pirates" by Ralph Spence. Guy Kibbee and ZaSu Pitts play a newly rich couple, so eager to buy their way into society they hire a waitress to pose as their daughter.

== Plot ==
Cora Upshaw wishes to climb into New York Society, but her more humble Kansas millionaire husband Matt prefers a more humble life. Returning from a European tour on which they purchased a painting by Tintoretto and other works of art, they are featured in the society pages of the New York newspapers. Augie Witherspoon, financial manager for wealthy Mrs. Forrester Marsh, sees the Upshaws and gets the idea to sell some of Mrs. Marsh's art collection to the Upshaws in order to raise funds to put her son Harley through music school.

Escaping his wife's social pretensions, Matt regularly visits a small diner across the street where he meets and befriends a waitress, Sandy. Meanwhile, Augie, with the intention of milking the Upshaws for all their money, convinces them to make a big splash on the social scene by holding a debutante party for their daughter. Cora is sold on the idea but does not reveal to Augie that she has no daughter. Matt proposes that Sandy, a former actress, pretend to be their daughter. Matt also proposes that Sandy not reveal to Cora that she is a waitress but to pretend to Cora that she is Millicent, an old friend's daughter.

On her way to the Upshaw's Manhattan residence, Sandy and Harley meet cute on Fifth Avenue. Harley falls in love with Sandy at first sight, but Sandy is annoyed by his attention. In a nod to Cinderella, Sandy loses her shoe and Harley retrieves it, holding it fondly as Sandy speeds away in a taxi with Matt. The Upshaws prepare to hold the coming-out party for their phony daughter, “Millicent.” Just as it begins, Sandy gets a phone call from a coworker informing her that her estranged husband Sam Long has been looking for her. At the same time, as Cora panics that no guests have arrived at the party, Matt inadvertently reveals to Cora that “Millicent” is actually a waitress named Sandy. Suddenly, Harley, Augie, and several other guests from high society arrive at the party. Augie has convinced the reluctant Harley to attend, hoping that Harley and “Millicent” will fall in love, marry, and bring the Upshaw's wealth into the impoverished Marsh family. When Harley arrives at the party, he discovers to his delight that “Millicent” is the girl he met on the street.

Though Augie is pleased that Harley has fallen in love with “Millicent”, Harley reveals that he loves “Millicent” so much that he refuses to pursue her solely for the sake of getting the Upshaw's money. Augie gets the idea of forcing Harley to propose to “Millicent” by making him jealous of another suitor. Augie hires an actor to pose as a suitor, but it turns out that the actor is in fact Sandy's husband Sam. Sam is introduced to “Millicent” by Augie and immediately recognizes her as Sandy. Sam shows Augie a picture of himself with Sandy as their vaudeville act as “The Longs — Sandy and Sammy.” Augie informs Matt Upshaw and Harley that “Millicent” is Sandy, and not an heiress but a waitress. Harley is delighted because now Sandy will not think he wants to marry her for her money, but then learns from Sam that she is already married.

Augie and the Upshaws hatch a plan to convince Sam to divorce Sandy, offering him ten thousand dollars to cooperate. In the process, Augie learns that Sam was already married with two children when he married Sandy, so their marriage is invalid. Augie informs the Upshaws, Harley, and Sandy. Upon learning the news, Harley proposes to Sandy and she agrees to marry him.

== Cast ==
- Guy Kibbee as Matt Upshaw
- ZaSu Pitts as Mrs. Cora Upshaw
- Edward Everett Horton as Augie Winterspoon
- Ross Alexander as Harley Marsh
- June Martel as Sandy Long
- Gordon Westcott as Sam Long
- Judy Canova as Annie
- Nella Walker as Mrs. Forrester Marsh
- Jack Norton as Sinclair
- Arthur Treacher as Waiter
