= Shaligram =

Fossilized shell used in Vaishnava Hinduism

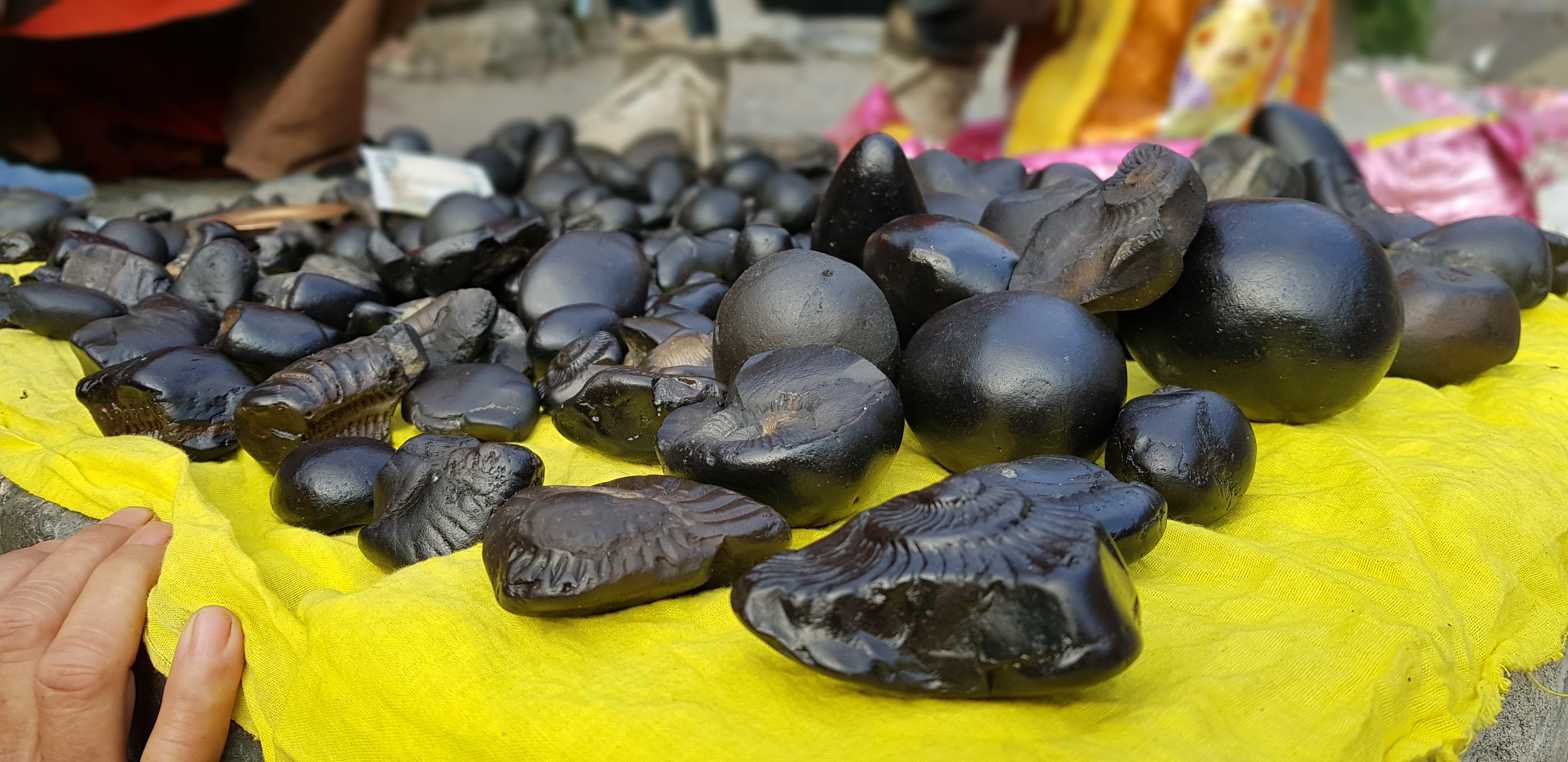
These ammonite fossils serve as a non-anthropomorphic symbol of Vishnu.

A shaligram, or shaligrama shila (Devanagari: शालिग्राम शिला; IAST: Śāligrāma-śilā), is a fossilized stone or ammonite from the prehistoric Tethys sea, collected from the riverbed or banks of the Kali Gandaki, a tributary of the Gandaki River in Nepal and India. It is also considered a form of Vishnu within Hinduism. In the various denominations of Hinduism, it is considered a sacred Shaktipitha associated with the worship of Shivalinga. The Kali Gandaki River flows through sacred places such as Muktinath and Damodar Kunda, enhancing the spiritual significance of these shaligrams. There are numerous different types of shaligrams.

== Legends ==
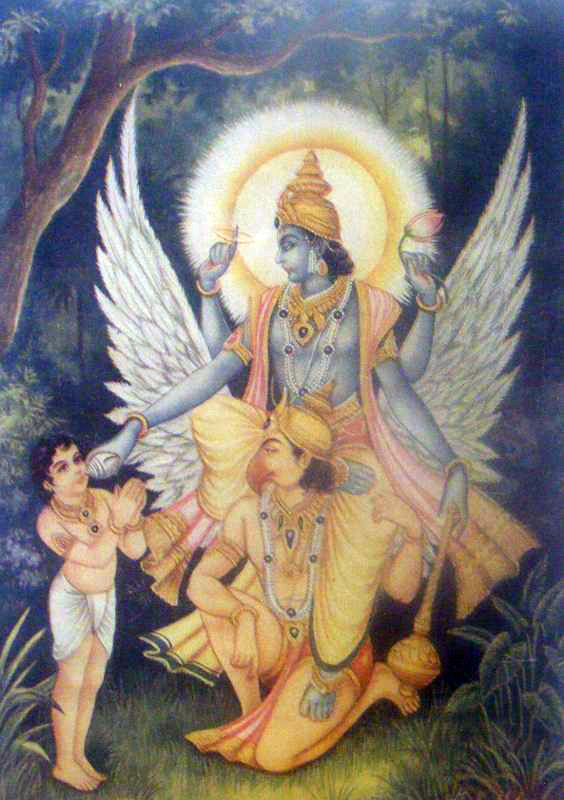
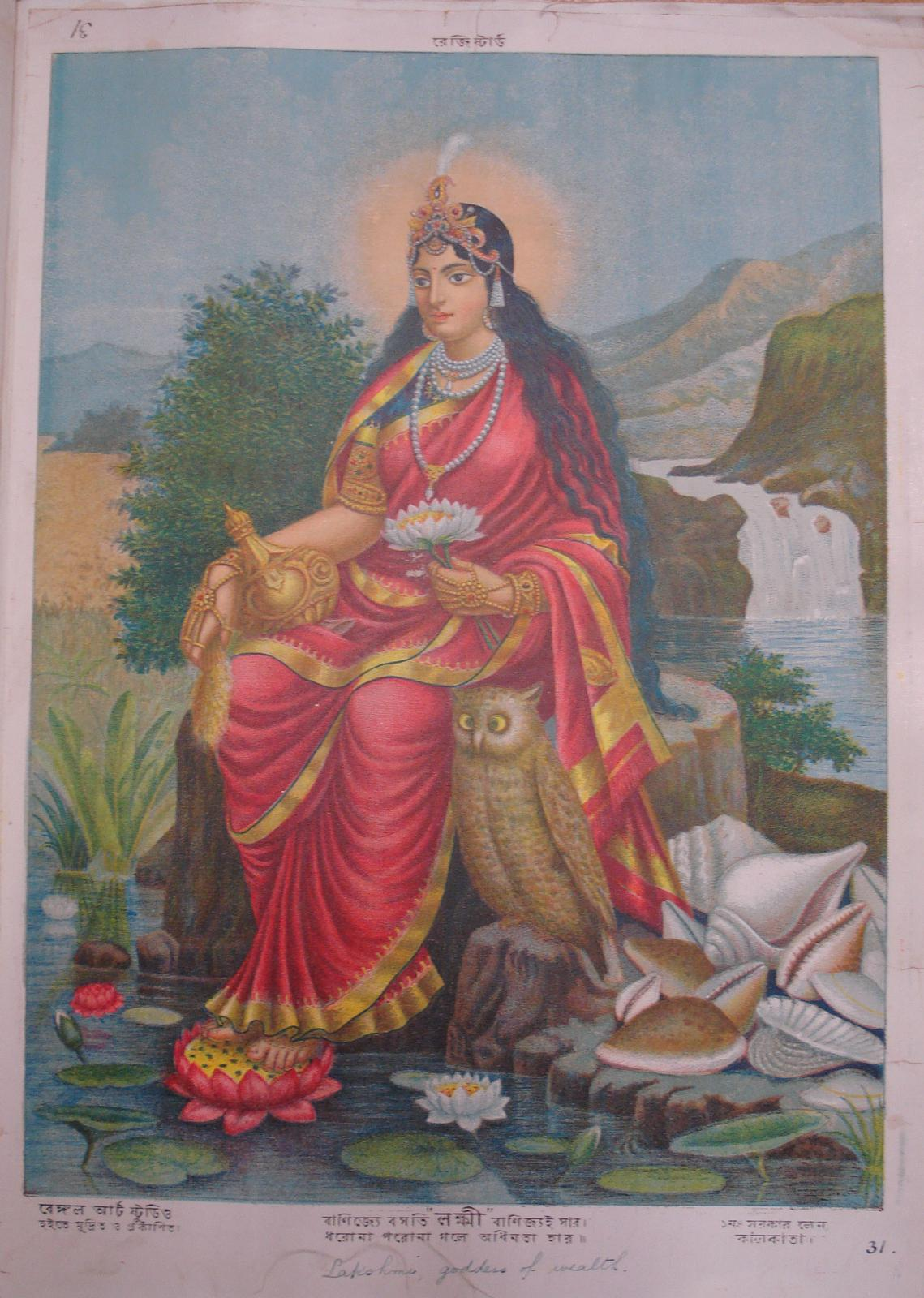
The shaligrama shila originated due to Vishnu (left) being cursed by Tulasi, an incarnation of his wife, Lakshmi (right), to transform into a stone

According to the Devi Bhagavata Purana, Brahmavaivarta Purana, and Shiva Purana, shilagrama shilas originated due to the following chain of events.

A king named Vrishadhvaja had been cursed by Surya to endure poverty, due to his reluctance to worship any deity other than Shiva. To regain their lost prosperity, his grandsons Dharmadhvaja and Kushadhvaja performed austerities to appease Lakshmi, the goddess of prosperity. Pleased with the austerities, she granted them prosperity and blessed them by being born as their respective daughters, Tulasi and Vedavati. Tulasi went to Badarikashrama to perform austerities as she desired Vishnu as her husband, but was told by Brahma that she would not get Vishnu as her husband in that life, and would have to marry the danava (demon) Shankhachuda.

In his previous birth, Shankhachuda was Shridhama, a supreme devotee of Krishna, an incarnation of Vishnu. In Goloka, he got the instructions from Krishna himself, to be born as a danava. As a result, Shankhachuda was virtuous and pious by nature, and was devoted to Vishnu. On the command of Brahma, he and Tulasi had a Gandharva marriage. Afterwards, the danavas, under Shankhachuda's leadership, waged a battle against their natural enemies, the devas, in which they won due to merit of Shankhachuda's virtue. The devas were subsequently driven out of Svarga by the victorious danavas.

Demoralised and defeated, the devas approached Vishnu, who told them that Shankhachuda was destined to be killed by Shiva. On being requested by the devas, Shiva, along with his attendants and the devas, waged a battle against the danavas, led by Shankhachuda. However, neither side was able to overpower the other. An unembodied voice told Shiva that by the boon of Brahma, Shankhachuda was invincible in combat as long as he wore his armour, and his wife remained chaste.

Vishnu, assuming the form of an old Brahmin, asked Shankhachuda for his armour while begging alms. Shankhachuda donated his armour to him. When he was busy fighting with Shiva, Vishnu, wearing Shankhachuda's armour, assumed the form of Shankhachuda, and lay with Tulasi. Thus, Tulasi lost her chastity, and Shankhachuda was killed by Shiva's trishula, thereby relieving Shridama from the curse.

At the moment of Shankhachuda's death, Tulasi became suspicious that the man with her was not Shankhachuda. When she discovered that it was Vishnu had deceived her, she cursed him to become a stone, as she believed that he had been emotionless like a stone in accomplishing the death of his devotee, Shankhachuda, and violating her chastity, though she was also his devotee. Vishnu consoled Tulasi by clarifying that it was the result of her austerities performed in the past in order to gain him as her husband, and that she would again become his wife upon casting off her body. Thus, Lakshmi cast off the body of Tulasi, and assumed a new form (which became known by the name of Tulasi). The discarded body of Tulasi was transformed into the Gandaki River, and from her hair emerged the tulsi shrub. Vishnu, on being cursed by Tulasi, assumed the form of a large rocky mountain known as shaligrama, on the banks of the Gandaki River where vajrakita, a type of worm with teeth as strong as the vajra, carved out various markings on his body. Such stones which fall from the surface of that mountain into the Gandaki River came to be known as the shaligrama shilas.

== History ==
Historically, the use of shaligrama shilas in worship can be traced to the time of Adi Shankara through the latter's works. Specifically, his commentaries to the verses 1.6.1 in Taittiriya Upanishad and 1.3.14 of the Brahma Sutras suggest that the use of shaligrama shila in the worship of Vishnu has been a well-known Hindu practice. A good number of fake shaligrama shilas, too, remain in circulation.

The statue of Narasimha in Guru Narasimha Temple, Saligrama is said to be entirely made of saligrama, and is said to be swayambhu (not carved by anyone, but occurred naturally). This seems to be the earliest mention of Saligrama as this temple was constructed prior to the birth of Adi Shankara.

Idols of Vishnu in the Padmanabhaswamy Temple of Thiruvananthapuram and Badrinath Temple of Garhwal region, and those of Krishna in Krishna Matha of Udupi and Radha Raman Temple of Vrindavana are also believed to be made from shaligrama shilas.

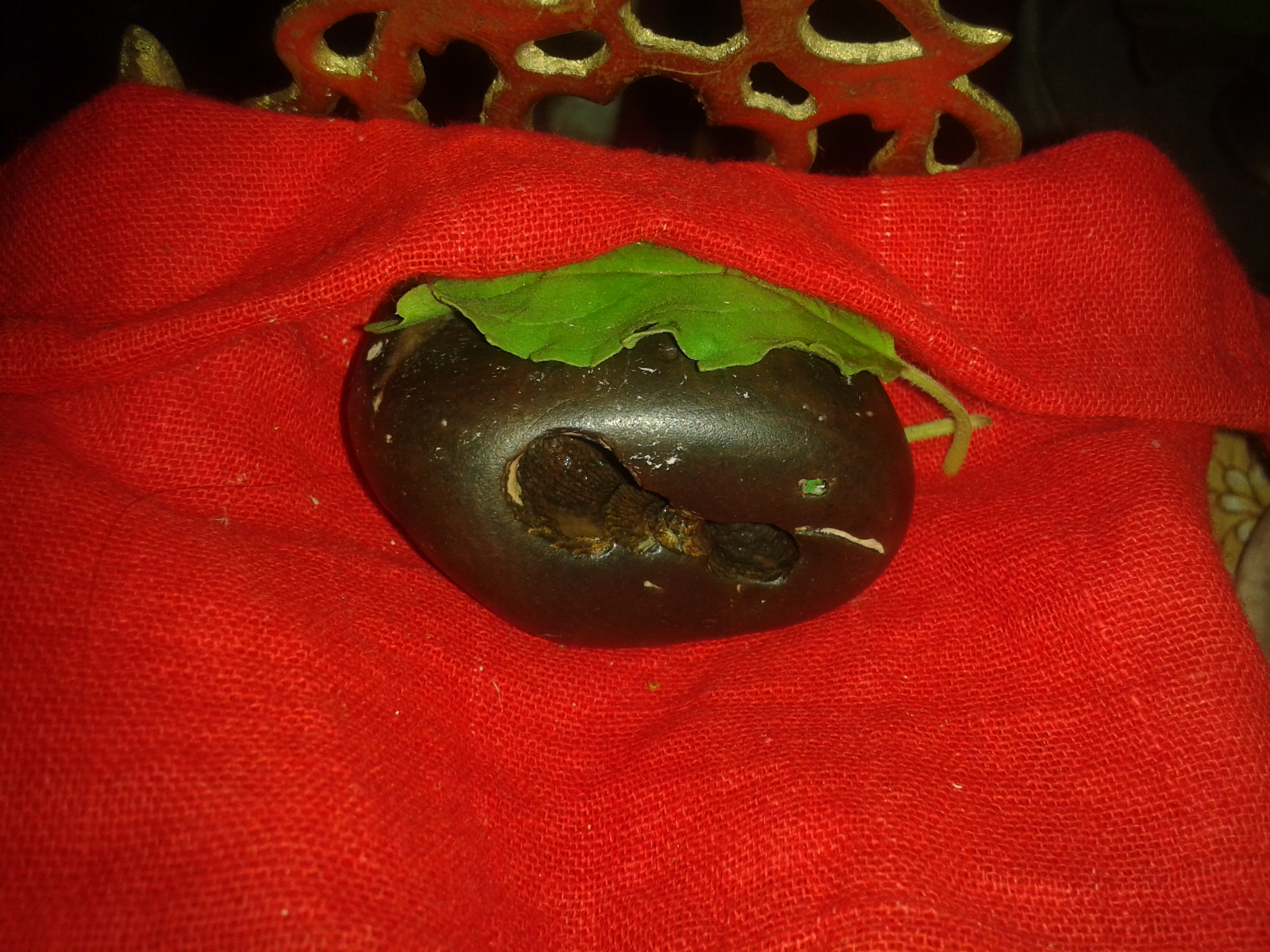
Lakshmi-Narasimha shaligrama shila worshipped in West Bengal

== Use ==
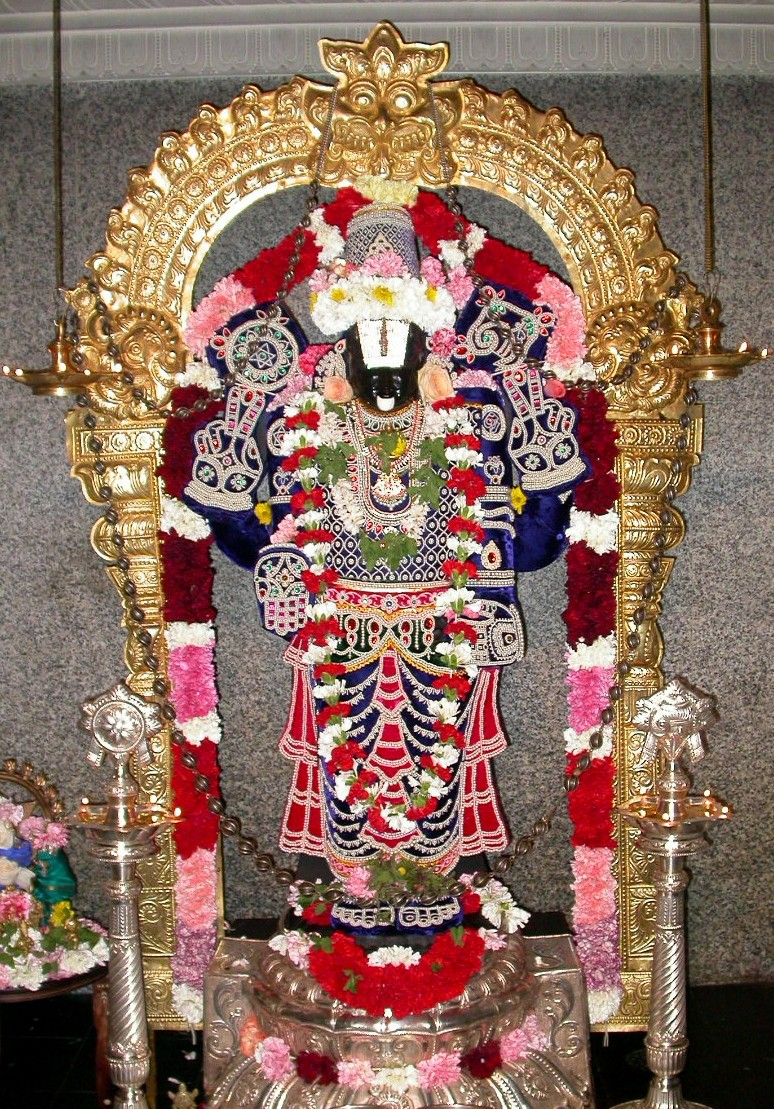
An idol of Venkateshvara in a temple of Miami decked with a garland made of 108 shaligrama shilas

Unlike traditional temple idols (murtis) that require a ritual installation, a shaligram is considered naturally "awake" and holy upon discovery.

Shaligrama shilas are used as non-anthropomorphic representations of Vishnu alongside Dvaravati shilas, similar to the use of yantra and kalasha in the veneration of Devi and linga and Baneshvara shilas in the veneration of Shiva. The Pranatoshani Tantra states that worship of all deities can be conducted on a shaligrama shila. The Puranas unequivocally state that worship of Vishnu done through a shaligrama shila yields greater merit than that done through a murti (idol).

Unlike murtis, shaligrama shilas can be worshipped in individual residencies alongside temples, can be carried away from one place to another easily and can be worshipped as long as the chakra inside it has not been broken or cracked. Apart from the traditional upacharas (articles of worship) whose number varies from five, 10, 16 to 18, worship of a shaligrama shila requires only tulasi leaves and water poured from a Dakshinavarti Shankh (special conchshell) for ablution compared to an murti which requires upacharas of monetary value like robes and jewellery. Hence worship of shaligrama shila can be afforded by people even in times of hardship and distress as the only mode of worship.

Hindus hailing from South India bedeck idols of Vishnu with a garland made of 108 shaligrama shilas. Bengali Hindus observe a ceremony called Svastyayana in which 108 or 1008 tulasi leaves anointed with sandalwood paste are offered on a shaligrama shila with the aim of healing diseases or being delivered from troubles. This can be accompanied by Chandipatha (ritualistic recitation of the Devi Mahatmya) once, thrice or five times; worshipping one or four clay Shivalingas and chanting the mantras of Durga and Vishnu 108 or 1008 times.

== Literature ==
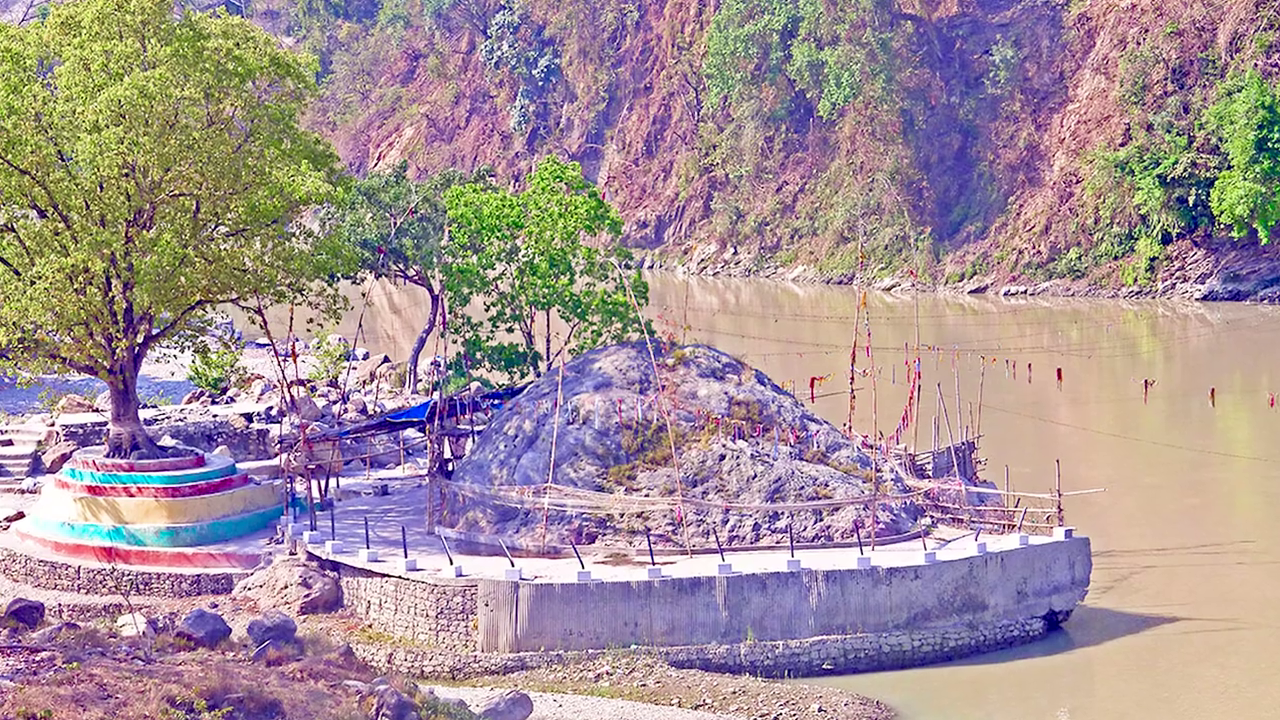
The largest shaligrama shila situated on the banks of the Kaligandaki River at Setibeni situated at the junctions of Parbat, Gulmi and Syangja districts in Nepal

The Pranatoshani Tantra states that:

1. The merit gained by worshipping Vishnu in a Shalagrama shila once is equivalent to that of conducting a thousand Rajasuya yajnas and donating the entire earth.
2. A person who is unable to undertake pilgrimage, donate articles to the needy and brahmins or conduct yajnas can gain mukti (liberation) by worshipping Vishnu in a Shalagrama shila.
3. Land situated within the radius of three yojanas of a Shalagrama shila becomes sacred to Vishnu even if that land is inhabited by mlecchas (non-Aryans). A devout worshipper who dies in such an area is never reborn again.
4. All sorts of auspicious activities (like taking ablution, donating articles to the needy and brahmins, undergoing austerities and conducting homa) grants merit for all eternity on being conducted in the vicinity of a Shalagrama shila.
5. All sorts of sins whether perceived in mind or committed in deeds for an entire year are destroyed by donating a Shalagrama shila to a brahmin.
6. The person who worships together 12 Shalagrama shilas for a single day earns the merit equivalent of worshipping 12 crore Shivalingas with lotuses made out of gold and residing in Varanasi for eight days.
7. The person who worships together 100 Shalagrama shilas attains Maharloka after death and is reborn as an emperor.
8. Moksha is undoubtedly obtained by the person who worships a Shalagrama shila and Dvaravati shila together.

The material is also mentioned in the Skanda Purana and Padma Purana.

== Restrictions ==
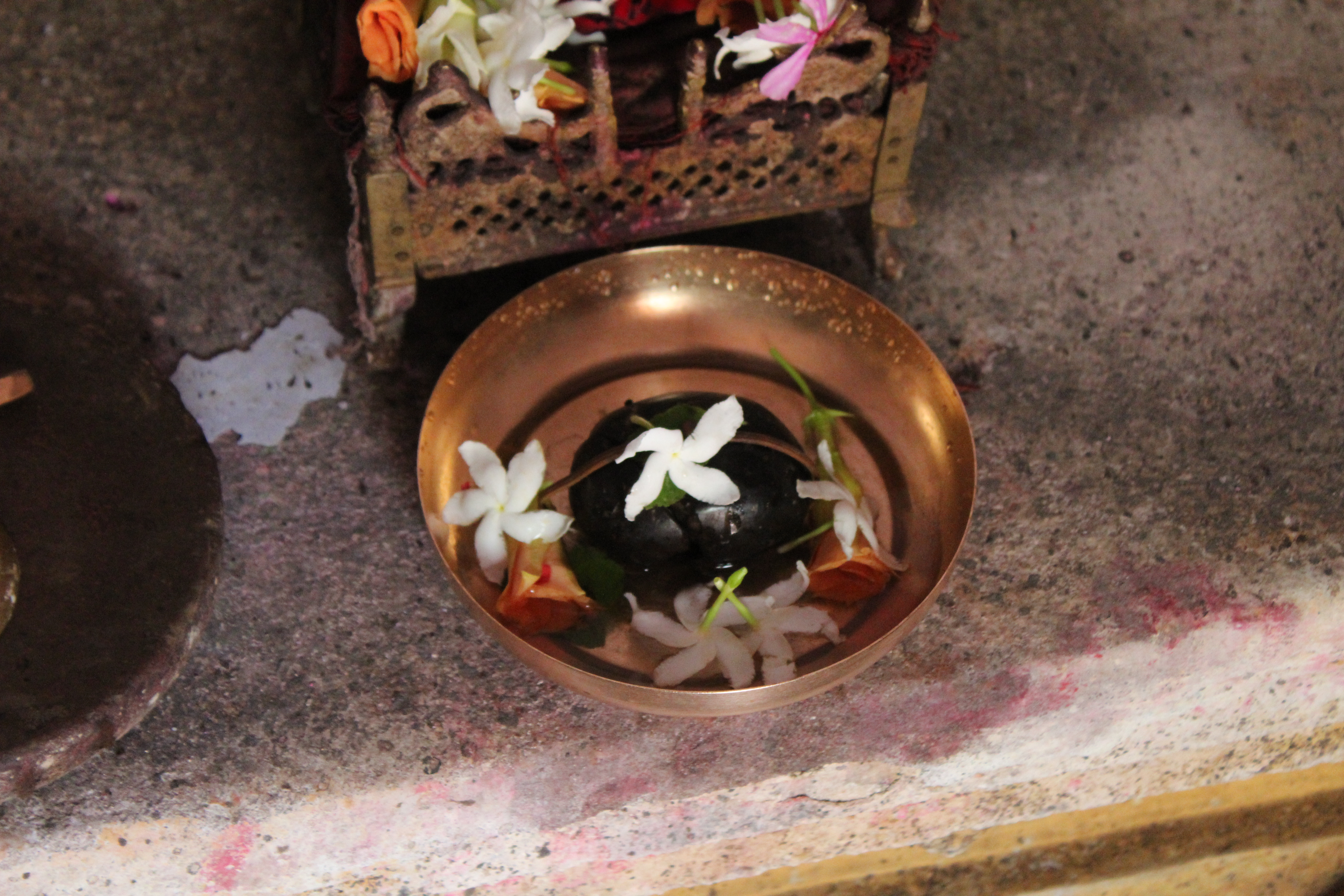
shaligrama shila worshipped in Hooghly district, West Bengal

1. The Pranatoshani Tantra states that nobody except initiated Brahmins, Kshatriya and Vaishya are allowed to touch a Shalagrama shila. On being touched by somebody other than them, the Shalagrama shila must be cleansed with panchagavya. However all persons are allowed to be the yajamana for the worship of a Shalagrama shila.
2. The Padma Purana, Patala Khanda, Chapter 20 prohibits women of all castes from touching a Shalagrama shila both directly (by anointing sandalwood paste) and indirectly (by offering flowers).
3. The Padma Purana, Patala Khanda, Chapter 79 states that person who buys and sells Shalagrama shilas is damned in hell as long as the sun exists in the sky. The same fate is destined for the person who approves of buying or selling Shalagrama shilas and the person who determines its monetary value.
4. The Devi Bhagavata Purana, 9th Skandha, Chapter 10 states that the person who places the Shalagrama shila on ground is damned in hell for a hundred Manvantaras where he experiences the pain of being eaten by worms.
5. The Devi Bhagavata Purana, 9th Skandha, Chapter 24 states that failing to keep one's promise or speaking lies while holding the Shalagrama shila in hand leads the person to be damned in hell for the life-time of Brahma. It also states that the person who removes a tulasi leaf from a Shalagrama shila is separated from his wife in his next birth.
6. The Devi Bhagavata Purana, 9th Skandha, Chapter 35 states that the person who swears falsely while touching a Shalagrama shila experiences the pain of being burnt in red-hot coal for the lifetime of 14 Indras in hell and is reborn as a worm residing in faeces for seven consecutive births.
