= Naranappa Uppoor =

Naranappa Uppoor (1918-1984), Yakshagana bhagavath

Naranappa Uppoor (1918–1984) was a famous bhagavath (Yakshagana singer) of Yakshagana art during the 20th century. He was much known for his voice, knowledge of tradition and heritage of Yakshagana. Dr. Shivarama Karanth, writer and his contemporary opined that Naranappa Uppoor is one person who is very familiar with the rich heritage of stage traditions (of Yakshagana). Only he can tell us what we had in the past and what we are losing.

== Early life and education ==
Narnappa Uppoor was born at Marvi, near Thattuvattu, a small village in Udupi Taluk, India; his father name is Marvi Srinivasa Uppoor. His father was his guru in Yakshagana. Marvi Srinivasa Uppoor was himself a bhagavath or Yakshagana singer for forty years and he was known for a distinct style of singing called "Marvi Style" and his brother Vasudeva uppoor was a maddale player for Yakshagana. Naranappa Uppoor leart singing as well as other aspects of Yakshagana from his father and family circle.

== Contribution to Yakshagana ==
Naranappa Uppoor started as Bhagavatha (singer) in Sri Amrutheshwari Mela, Kota in 1937. Narnappa Uppoor was one of the notable background singers of the 20th century. In his career of more than four decades, he has worked as bhagavatha in several Yakshagana troupes, including Sri Amrutheshwari Yakshagana Mandali, Kota, and other melas located at Saligrama, Soukur, Idugunji, Kollur, Maranakatte etc. He was knowing 40 prasangas (story poems) by heart and he could sing 60 yakshagana ragas (tunes).

=== Association with Dr. Karanth ===
Naranappa Uppoor actively involved with experiments of Dr. Shivarama Karanth in the field of Yakshagana. Dr. Karanth tried various reformations to Yakshagana, one being reduction of total time of the performance from earlier 8–10 hours to 2–3 hours. Another bold experiment by Dr. Karanth was Yakshagana Byale, where ballet techniques are mingled with Yakshagana dance and together they produced Krishnarjuna Kalaga, Yakshagana ballet which was applauded by art lovers of Mumbai in 1968. Dr. Shivarama Karanth has acknowledged the support given by Naranappa Uppoor in his research on Yakshagana.

=== Author ===
He authored Yakshagana Adhyayana, a book dedicated to ancient heritage of Yakshagana, which include yakshagana syllabus for learners also.

== Teaching ==
He has trained several students in yakshagana background singing and several such students have become good bhagavaths. Most famous of his student was Kalinga Navada, who was said to have inherited Narnappa Uppoor's style of singing. Subrahmanya Dhareshwar, Raghavendra mayya, another famous bhagavath of coastal Karnatak learnt bhagavathike(singing) from Naranappa Uppoor. He also encouraged other background artists like Maddale beaters. Kalinga Navada, famous Yakshagana singer was trained as bhagavatha by Uppoor. Some other students are G. Sadananda Aithala, K.G. Rama Rao, K.P. Hegade, Narayana Shabaraya, S. Suresh Shetty, Halady Raghavendra Mayya etc.

=== Yakshagana Kalakendra, Hangarakatte ===
This school for teaching yakshagana was started by Naranappa Uppoor in 1972 at Hangarkatte Yakshagana Kendra of Heremalingeshwara Temple in Kota with his maddalegara Belanje Thimmaappa Naik helping by A Sadananda Hebbar. Hundreds of students learnt Yakshagana art at this center and later performed Yakshagana art in various troupes of Coastal Karnataka.

== The death ==
On 12 April 1984, Bhagavatha Narnappa Uppoor suffered heart attack when singing for Amrutheshwari Yakshagana troupe (his first employer) during a public performance and succumbed later on the same day.

== Award instituted ==
Selected Yakshagana artists are awarded with "Bhagavath Naranappa Uppoor Award" every year from yakshagana kalaranga udupi.
