= Nevada Gulch =

Valley in South Dakota, United States

Coordinates: 44°20′09″N 103°47′14″W

Nevada Gulch (elevation 5,289 feet (1,612 m)) is a valley in Lawrence County, South Dakota, in the United States.

Nevada Gulch took its name from the U.S. state of Nevada.
