= Nawada, Mainpuri =

Village in Uttar Pradesh, India

Nawada
- Village
- Location in Uttar Pradesh, India
- Coordinates: 27.25331°N 79.01711°E
- Country: India
- State: Uttar Pradesh
- District: Mainpuri
- Tehsil: Mainpuri

Area
  - Total: 2.702 km^{2} (1.043 sq mi)

Population (2011)
  - Total: 1,618
  - Density: 598.8/km^{2} (1,551/sq mi)
- Time zone: UTC+5:30 (IST)
- PIN: 205001

Nawada (Nawādā) is a village in Mainpuri block of Mainpuri district, Uttar Pradesh. As of 2011, it has a population of 1,618, in 270 households.

== Demographics ==
As of 2011, Nawada had a population of 1,618, in 270 households. This population was 54.3% male (878) and 45.7% female (740). The 0-6 age group numbered 262 (152 male and 110 female), or 16.2% of the total population. 385 residents were members of Scheduled Castes, or 23.8% of the total.

The 1981 census recorded Nawada as having a population of 824 people, in 140 households.

The 1961 census recorded Nawada as comprising 3 hamlets, with a total population of 417 people (246 male and 171 female), in 81 households and 68 physical houses. The area of the village was given as 669 acres.

== Infrastructure ==
As of 2011, Nawada had 2 primary schools and 1 dispensary. Drinking water was provided by hand pump and tube well; there were no public toilets. The village did not have a post office or public library; there was at least some access to electricity for all purposes. Streets were made of both kachcha and pakka materials.
