= Kalinga Navada =

G.R Kalinga Navada
- Born: 6 June 1957; Gundmi, Udupi, Karnataka, India
- Died: 27 May 1990 (aged 32); Udupi, Karnataka
- Occupation: Yakshagana Bhagavatha ('background singer')
- Writing career
- Years active: 1971-1990

Kalinga Navada (1957–1990) was a well-known Yakshagana Bhagavatha ('background singer') of the 20th century. He was noted for his melodious voice and tone and new innovations made in rendering yakshagana songs which earned him various titles like "Kanchina Kanta", "Karavali Kogile", "Rasaraga Chakravarthy", "Yuga Pravartaka".

== Family ==
Kalinga Navada was born on 6 June 1957 as the fifth son to Padmavathi and Ramachandra Navada at Gundmi Village, Udupi District, Karnataka, India.

He married Vijayashree and had one son Agneya Navada.

== Career ==
Navada inherited his art from his father Ramachandra Navada who was a well-known Yakshagana Bhagavatha during the 1960s–80s. Learning the art ranging from 'Hoovina kolu', 'jaapu' and 'chchaapu' of Yakshagana, he stepped into this creative art form. Within a brief span he was able to make good tunes, which attracted people. Imbibing the technicalities of music from the veteran Naranappa Uppoor and Ramachandra Navada, Kalinga Navada's talent was much appreciated by his fans and he was a cult hero of Yakshagana art. With a proper hold on theatre, Navada innovated new ragas to reduce the monotony and increase the attraction thus bringing a special effect in Yakshagana. With a fusion of new ragas like Revati, Kalavathi, Chaand, and Bihag with old ones, Navada was prominent in the Yakshagana field.

At the age of 14, he debuted as a Lead Bhagavata for Kota Shri Amrutheshwari Mela with help and guidance from Uppoor. He was the Bhagavata in Uppoor's troupe from 1971 to 1976 and in 1977 he joined the Vijayashree Yakshagana Mela (Shri Ananthapadmanabha Mela) of Perdoor and became popular. From 1978, after he joined Saligrama Mela (Shri Guruprasaditha Yakshagana Mandali), his success continued until 1990.

== Death ==
Navada died aged 32 in a road mishap near Udupi.

== New Prasanga (Poetry) ==
Kalinga Navada has written the memorable Samajika yakshagana prasangas - Amruthamati, Bhagyashree, Roopashri, Vijayashri, Kanchanashri & Nagashri to name a few. Out of which Nagashri stands tall in terms of maximum number of shows in Yakshagana history. His Song "Neela Gaganadolu / Navilu Kuniyuthide" became a hit amongst the Yakshagana fans.

== Awards received ==
- Rajyotsava Prashasti (Posthumous) in 1990
- Karavali Kogile
- Rasaraga Chakravarthi

== Awards instituted ==
Many awards, in the name of Kalinga Navada, is awarded to Yakshagana artists every year (both Himmela and Mummela).
