= Nevada (Grey novel) =

1928 book by Zane Grey

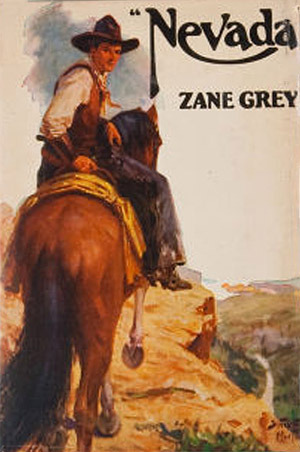
- Author: Zane Grey
- Language: English
- Genre: Western novel
- Publisher: Harper & Brothers
- Publication date: February 1928
- Publication place: United States
- Media type: Print (Hardback)
- Pages: 365 pages
- Preceded by: Forlorn River

"Nevada" is a 1928 Western novel by Zane Grey, a sequel to 1927's Forlorn River. Prior to its book publication it was serialized in seven issues of The American Magazine (November 1926 – May 1927). The novel was adapted for films in 1927 and 1944.

== Premise ==
Ben Ide, restless with the rancher life, moves his family to Arizona, ostensibly for his mother's health, but also to search for his missing partner Nevada. He buys a beautiful ranch, in a territory known for cattle rustling. The deal soon sours as he struggles to keep his cattle and prize horses from the network of rustlers about the wild country of Arizona, not sure who he can trust and who he can't. Hettie Ide pines away for the missing Nevada, meanwhile fending off a horde of suitors.

Nevada, having escaped the end of Forlorn River with only his life, resumes the life of an outlaw, seeking a way out of his situation. However, he is working his way deeper amidst the labyrinthine social network of Arizona, in which everyone is a rustler and no one will say who leads the gangs.

== Characters ==
- "Nevada" is Ben Ide's trusted riding partner, whose past is a mystery and whose future uncertain.
- Ben Ide is wild horse-catcher turned prosperous rancher, he moves his family to Arizona, running into even more wildness than he bargained for.
- Ina Ide is formerly Ina Blaine, Ben's wife.
- Marvie Blaine is Ina's young brother, intent on living the wild life of both cowboy and gunman.
- Hettie Ide is Ben's younger sister, intent on finding the missing Nevada.
- Jim Lacy is an infamous gunslinger from Texas.
- Rose Hatt is daughter of a family of rustlers.
- Cash Burridge is a rustler acquaintance of Nevada's who sells Ben Ide his ranch.
- Tom Day is a successful Arizona rancher who befriends Ben.
- Judge Franklidge is a successful businessman who owns a prosperous ranch.
- Clan Dillon is a shady cattleman whom Ben hires as a foreman.
- Burt Stillwell is a cattle rustler and associate of the Hatt family.
- Elam Hatt is a backwoods rancher and suspected rustler.
- Cedar Hatt is the no-good son of Elam Hatt and patriarch of the Hatt family.

== Adaptations ==
Nevada was adapted for the screen in 1927 and 1944.
