= Sarah Edwards (actress) =

American actress (1881–1965)

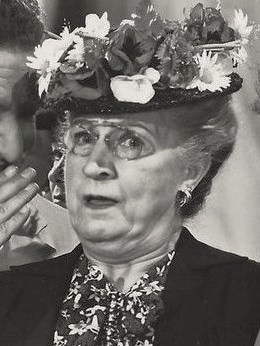
- Edwards in It's a Joke, Son! (1947)
- Born: October 11, 1881; Glyn Ceiriog, Denbighshire, Wales
- Died: January 7, 1965 (aged 83); Hollywood, California, U.S.
- Occupation: Actress
- Years active: 1916–1951
- Spouse: Vernon Malcolm Jacobson (m. 1937; died 1955)

Sarah Edwards (October 11, 1881 – January 7, 1965) was a Welsh-born American film and stage actress. She often played dowagers or spinsters in numerous Hollywood movies of the 1930s and 1940s, mostly in minor roles.

== Career ==
Edwards started her acting career as a stage actress. She was described in 1916 by a newspaper article as a leading actress "very popular with West End theatre-goers".

She eventually settled in the United States and appeared in six Broadway plays between 1919 and 1931, primarily in comedies like The Merry Malones by George M. Cohan. Among her first movies was the New York-filmed 1929 musical Glorifying the American Girl (1929), where she portrayed the mercenary mother of the character played by lead actress Mary Eaton. She came to Hollywood in the mid-1930s where she appeared in about 190 films until her retirement 1951, mostly in uncredited, small character roles. Edwards died in Hollywood in 1965, aged 83.

Edwards often portrayed a "kindly grandmother, imperious dowager, hardy pioneer wife, ill-tempered teacher and strict governess". She remains notable as the imperious mother of Mary Hatch (Donna Reed) in It's a Wonderful Life (1946). Edwards also played a customer in Ernst Lubitsch's The Shop Around the Corner (1940) with James Stewart. She also appeared in The Bishop's Wife (1947) with Cary Grant, and as the wife of a doctor on the train in Hitchcock's Shadow of a Doubt (1943). Edwards sometimes had more substantial roles, for instance in Charlie Chan in the Secret Service (1944).

== Partial filmography ==
- Glorifying the American Girl (1929) - Mrs. Hughes
- Wayward (1932) - Nurse (uncredited)
- American Madness (1932) - Gossip on Phone (uncredited)
- Smarty (1934) - Mrs. Crosby's Mother (uncredited)
- Side Streets (1934) - Second Customer (uncredited)
- The World Accuses (1934) - Lucille Weymouth
- Sweepstake Annie (1935) - Friend of Mrs. Foster (uncredited)
- Shadow of Doubt (1935) - Dowager in Taxi (uncredited)
- Ruggles of Red Gap (1935) - Mrs. Myron Carey (uncredited)
- People Will Talk (1935) - Martie Beemish
- Man on the Flying Trapeze (1935) - Motorcar Owner (uncredited)
- Welcome Home (1935) - Mrs. Edwards
- Anna Karenina (1935) - Wife - Second Couple (uncredited)
- The Dark Angel (1935) - Josephine Bidley (uncredited)
- I Live My Life (1935) - Professor Douglas (uncredited)
- Two-Fisted (1935) - Abigail Adams
- It's in the Air (1935) - Old Maid (uncredited)
- Stars Over Broadway (1935) - Woman Dancing with Fat Man (uncredited)
- One Way Ticket (1935) - Miss Aldridge (uncredited)
- Miss Pacific Fleet (1935) - Woman with Mrs. Freytag in Snuggle-Up Inn (uncredited)
- Dangerous Intrigue (1936) - Superintendent of Nurses (uncredited)
- The Walking Dead (1936) - Female Doctor - Guest at Party (uncredited)
- Colleen (1936) - First Society Woman (uncredited)
- The Great Ziegfeld (1936) - Wardrobe Woman (uncredited)
- Moonlight Murder (1936) - Autograph Seeker (uncredited)
- The Golden Arrow (1936) - Mrs. Meyers
- Early to Bed (1936) - Miss Barton (uncredited)
- Palm Springs (1936) - Miss Pinchon
- My American Wife (1936) - Townswoman (uncredited)
- Two-Fisted Gentleman (1936) - Mrs. O'Shea
- The General Died at Dawn (1936) - American's Companion (uncredited)
- Stage Struck (1936) - Schoolteacher at Aquarium (uncredited)
- Theodora Goes Wild (1936) - Mrs. Moffat (uncredited)
- We're on the Jury (1937) - Miss Evelyn Bottomley
- Maytime (1937) - Minor Role (uncredited)
- The Jones Family in Big Business (1937) - Miss Collins - School Principal (uncredited)
- Public Wedding (1937) - Mrs. J.P. Van Drexel (uncredited)
- Varsity Show (1937) - Mrs. Biddle (uncredited)
- Life Begins in College (1937) - Teacher (uncredited)
- It's Love I'm After (1937) - Mrs. Hinkle
- Partners in Crime (1937) - Committee Woman (uncredited)
- The Awful Truth (1937) - Lucy's Attorney's Wife (uncredited)
- Second Honeymoon (1937) - Woman in Airplane (uncredited)
- Love Is a Headache (1938) - Mrs. Warden, Fan from New Jersey (uncredited)
- Gold Is Where You Find It (1938) - Party Guest (uncredited)
- Merrily We Live (1938) - Mrs. Fleming (uncredited)
- Fools for Scandal (1938) - Tourist Buying Rug (uncredited)
- Judge Hardy's Children (1938) - Miss Adams, Cotillion Hostess (uncredited)
- Women Are Like That (1938) - Mrs. Snell
- The Beloved Brat (1938) - Miss Brundage (uncredited)
- A Trip to Paris (1938) - Woman in Bank (uncredited)
- Woman Against Woman (1938) - Party Guest (uncredited)
- Keep Smiling (1938) - Governess (uncredited)
- Three Loves Has Nancy (1938) - Autograph Session Chairwoman (uncredited)
- Sons of the Legion (1938) - Mrs. Hynes
- Touchdown, Army (1938) - Mrs. Rawlings (uncredited)
- A Man to Remember (1938) - Clerk (uncredited)
- The Cowboy and the Lady (1938) - Dinner Party Guest (uncredited)
- The Shining Hour (1938) - Chairman of Morals Society (uncredited)
- Boy Trouble (1939) - Mrs. Moots
- Persons in Hiding (1939) - Beauty Shop Proprietor (uncredited)
- The Adventures of Huckleberry Finn (1939) - Mrs. Annie Rucker (uncredited)
- Blondie Meets the Boss (1939) - Saleswoman (uncredited)
- Inside Story (1939) - (uncredited)
- Unmarried (1939) - Mrs. Jones
- 6,000 Enemies (1939) - Fourth Lady (uncredited)
- Coast Guard (1939) - Florence (uncredited)
- Espionage Agent (1939) - Militant American Tourist (uncredited)
- Here I Am a Stranger (1939) - Chaperone at Dance (uncredited)
- Sabotage (1939) - Laura Austin - Judgmental Woman on Street (uncredited)
- Too Busy to Work (1939)
- Meet Dr. Christian (1939) - Mrs. Minnows
- The Amazing Mr. Williams (1939) - Citizens Committee Woman (uncredited)
- Remember? (1939) - Lady in Revolving Door (uncredited)
- The Shop Around the Corner (1940) - Woman Customer
- Free, Blonde and 21 (1940) - Minor Role (uncredited)
- Star Dust (1940) - Woman in Dining Car (uncredited)
- Curtain Call (1940) - Literary Committee Member (uncredited)
- Opened by Mistake (1940) - Mrs. Karff (uncredited)
- Lucky Cisco Kid (1940) - Choir Leader (uncredited)
- Anne of Windy Poplars (1940) - (uncredited)
- New Moon (1940) - Marquise della Rosa (uncredited)
- Young People (1940) - Mrs. Stinchfield
- The Bride Wore Crutches (1940) - Mrs. Hopkins, Landlady (uncredited)
- The Howards of Virginia (1940) - Neighbor Girl (uncredited)
- Strike Up the Band (1940) - Miss Hodges
- Arise, My Love (1940) - Spinster (uncredited)
- Little Men (1940) - Landlady (uncredited)
- The Invisible Woman (1940) - Showroom Buyer (uncredited)
- The Face Behind the Mask (1941) - Mrs. Perkins (uncredited)
- Ride, Kelly, Ride (1941) - Teacher (uncredited)
- Footsteps in the Dark (1941) - Mrs. Belgarde (uncredited)
- Meet John Doe (1941) - Mrs. Hawkins (uncredited)
- Mr. District Attorney (1941) - Miss Petherby
- She Knew All the Answers (1941) - (uncredited)
- Tom, Dick and Harry (1941) - Mrs. Burton (uncredited)
- Sunset in Wyoming (1941) - Susanna Hawkins Peabody
- Private Nurse (1941) - Nurse (uncredited)
- One Foot in Heaven (1941) - Mrs. Spicer (scenes deleted)
- You Belong to Me (1941) - Mrs. Snyder (uncredited)
- Three Girls About Town (1941) - Clubwoman (uncredited)
- Birth of the Blues (1941) - Dowager in Cafe (uncredited)
- I Wake Up Screaming (1941) - Customer (uncredited)
- Miss Polly (1941) - Angie Turner
- H. M. Pulham, Esq. (194) - Mrs. Motford - Kay's Mother (uncredited)
- Glamour Boy (1941) - Second Matron (uncredited)
- Bedtime Story (1941) - Housekeeper (uncredited)
- Reap the Wild Wind (1942) - Dowager at Tea (uncredited)
- Rings on Her Fingers (1942) - Mrs. Clancy
- My Favorite Blonde (1942) - Mrs. Weatherwax (uncredited)
- Moonlight Masquerade (1942) - Minor Role (uncredited)
- Flight Lieutenant (1942) - Customer (uncredited)
- Sons of the Pioneers (1942) - Housekeeper (uncredited)
- The Gay Sisters (1942) - Lady in Elevator (uncredited)
- Apache Trail (1942) - Stagecoach Passenger (uncredited)
- Scattergood Survives a Murder (1942) - Selma Quentin
- The Forest Rangers (1942) - Mrs. Hansen (uncredited)
- Happy Go Lucky (1943) - Spinster (uncredited)
- Shadow of a Doubt (1943) - Doctor's Wife on Train (uncredited)
- The Powers Girl (1943) - School Board Membner (uncredited)
- Calaboose (1943) - The Colonel (uncredited)
- Dixie Dugan (1943) - Mrs. Kelly
- All by Myself (1943) - Mrs. Vincent
- Hers to Hold (1943) - Graduate Nurse (uncredited)
- Let's Face It (1943) - Woman in Court (uncredited)
- My Kingdom for a Cook (1943) - Woman in Employment Office (uncredited)
- Nearly Eighteen (1943) - Miss Perkins
- Where Are Your Children? (1943) - Matron
- Charlie Chan in the Secret Service (1944) - Mrs. Hargue
- You Can't Ration Love (1944) - Miss Hawks (uncredited)
- Rationing (1944) - Mrs. Beachman (uncredited)
- Henry Aldrich Plays Cupid (1944) - Mrs. Bradley (uncredited)
- The Story of Dr. Wassell (1944) - 'Janssen' Passenger (uncredited)
- The Adventures of Mark Twain (1944) - Townswoman (uncredited)
- Henry Aldrich's Little Secret (1944) - Mrs. Bradley
- Bathing Beauty (1944) - Faculty Member (uncredited)
- Three Little Sisters (1944) - Addie Pepperdine (uncredited)
- Storm Over Lisbon (1944) - Maude Perry-Tonides
- The Thin Man Goes Home (1944) - Passenger on Train asking 'Why Should I?' (uncredited)
- Music for Millions (1944) - Lady in Train Station (uncredited)
- Eadie Was a Lady (1945) - Mrs. Meeker (uncredited)
- The Clock (1945) - Clerk at Blood Lab (uncredited)
- The Corn Is Green (1945) - Mrs. Watty's Friend (uncredited)
- Two O'Clock Courage (1945) - Mrs. Tuttle (Patty's Landlady) (uncredited)
- Lady on a Train (1945) - Waring Cousin (uncredited)
- Girls of the Big House (1945) - Dormitory Matron
- Allotment Wives (1945) - Sadie
- Saratoga Trunk (1945) - Miss Diggs
- Girl on the Spot (1946) - Mrs. Richards (uncredited)
- Song of Arizona (1946) - Dolly Finnuccin
- The Hoodlum Saint (1946) - Apartment Seeker (uncredited)
- Renegades (1946) - Townswoman (uncredited)
- Easy to Wed (1946) - Mrs. Dibson (uncredited)
- Shadowed (1946) - Tillie
- No Leave, No Love (1946) - Irate Woman (uncredited)
- The Verdict (1946) - Housekeeper (uncredited)
- Undercurrent (1946) - Cora (uncredited)
- Cross My Heart (1946) - Matron (uncredited)
- It's a Wonderful Life (1946) - Mrs. Hatch
- It's a Joke, Son! (1947) - Annabelle (uncredited)
- My Brother Talks to Horses (1947) - Townswoman (uncredited)
- That Way with Women (1947) - Mrs. Irwin (uncredited)
- The Devil Thumbs a Ride (1947) - Minnie (uncredited)
- The Romance of Rosy Ridge (1947) - Mrs. Dessark (uncredited)
- That Hagen Girl (1947) - Charlotte Miller (uncredited)
- The Bishop's Wife (1947) - Mrs. Duffy
- Good News (1947) - Miss Pritchard (uncredited)
- The Voice of the Turtle (1947) - Woman Seeking Theater Tickets (uncredited)
- The Main Street Kid (1948) - Mrs. Clauson
- California Firebrand (1948) - Granny Hortense Mason
- Good Sam (1948) - Mrs. Gilmore (scenes deleted)
- Isn't It Romantic? (1948) - Bird-Like Woman (uncredited)
- Family Honeymoon (1948) - Mrs. Carp (uncredited)
- Air Hostess (1949) - Bertha Hallum
- Samson and Delilah (1949) - Spectator (uncredited)
- The Petty Girl (1950) - Prof. Morrison (uncredited)
- The Fuller Brush Girl (1950) - Mrs. East (uncredited)
- The Glass Menagerie (1950) - Mrs. Miller (uncredited)
- The Lemon Drop Kid (1951) - Woman in Home (uncredited)
- Honeychile (1951) - Sarah
- Carson City (1952) - Spinster on Stagecoach (uncredited)
