= My Little Grass Shack in Kealakekua, Hawaii =

"My Little Grass Shack in Kealakekua, Hawaiʻi"

Single by Ted Fio Rito and His Orchestra
- Recorded: December 13, 1933
- Genre: Hapa Haole; Big Band
- Length: 3:08
- Label: Brunswick Records
- Songwriters: Bill Cogswell; Tommy Harrison; Johnny Noble

"My Little Grass Shack in Kealakekua, Hawaiʻi", written by Tommy Harrison, Bill Cogswell, and Johnny Noble in Hawaii in 1933, is a Hawaiian song in the Hawaiian musical style known as hapa haole. One of the earliest recordings by Ted Fio Rito and his orchestra reached number one on the charts in 1934. Honolulu magazine listed it as number 41 in a 2007 article, "50 Greatest Songs of Hawaii". It has been heard in many movies and television shows and has been covered dozens of times. The title is sometimes shortened to "My Little Grass Shack" or "Little Grass Shack".

== Composition ==
The song was written by Tommy Harrison and Bill Cogswell for Kona's Independence Day celebration in 1933. The scene was set by the Kona Historical Society:

Kealakekua Bay was the setting for the annual Fourth of July canoe races... During the festivities, a new song written in honor of the occasion was sung for the first time in public. As unfamiliar lyrics rang out over the water, smiling hula dancers swished to and fro, laughing as they imitated swimming fishes and eating two-finger poi with their nimble fingers. The crowd applauded their approval and demanded an encore performance.

Cogswell, a Montana native working in Honolulu who in the 1950s became managing director of the Hawaii Visitors Bureau, was accompanying visitors to the Big Island of Hawaii when he wrote the lyrics, a parody of a 1924 song, "Back in Hackensack, New Jersey". Harrison, who composed the music, showed the song to the Hawaiian songwriter and band leader Johnny Noble, a leading figure in hapa haole music. Noble had already heard the song but rejected it because of its similarity to "Hackensack" and because "everyone seemed to have claimed writing it." Harrison persisted and Noble relented upon the recommendation of Mabel Thomas, a Variety magazine correspondent.

He faced two challenges: Revising the melody to avoid conflicts with "Hackensack" without altering Cogswell's words, as he was "inspired by the lyrics" and their "nostalgic appeal", and crafting the song into a hit:

He set to work revising the music, removing the phrases which to him seemed unoriginal, putting in the touches which... make all the difference between a pretty good song and a song-hit. It was not easy... For days Johnny worked at the piano, playing phrases over and over, scribbling in notes and rests, and still he was not satisfied. There was something he wanted to do to it, but it would not come. And then, quite suddenly it did... 'Honey dear,' he grinned at [his wife Emilie], as he turned from the piano, his eyes shining. 'It's done, and it's good, isn't it?'"

In naming "My Little Grass Shack" one of the "50 Greatest Songs of Hawaii", as chosen by a panel of experts, Honolulu magazine singled out Noble's contribution: "This light-hearted ditty exemplifies composer and band-leader Johnny Noble's talent at creating hapa haole tunes tailor-made for tourists' tastes, but palatable for locals as well."

Noble published the sheet music under the title "My Little Grass Shack in Kealakekua". In "Notes on Hawaiian Music", Noble said, "The first two thousand copies sold locally went like hot cakes—the demand for the song was too great. I ordered another two thousand and they too were sold out within a few weeks." With offers from many mainland music publishers, he awarded publishing rights to San Francisco-based Sherman, Clay & Co. for a $500.00 advance against royalties.

== Popularity and early recordings ==
Noble sent the sheet music to bandleader Ted Fio Rito at the Ambassador Hotel in Los Angeles where he was regularly playing the Cocoanut Grove radio remote (a nationwide broadcast of live big band ballroom concerts). Fio Rito had been doing radio remotes since 1924 when he was co-leader of a band with Dan Russo (coincidentally, a co-writer of "Back in Hackensack, New Jersey"). Fio Rito liked the song well enough to "push it by playing it on his radio program."

Fio Rito recorded "My Little Grass Shack" on December 13, 1933, for Brunswick Records. The big band arrangement featured guitarist Muzzy Marcellino singing the vocal chorus and The Debutantes, a vocal trio, singing the verses. The song reached number one on Billboard and stayed on the charts for 14 weeks. Fio Rito recorded the song again in 1938 for Decca, The Debutantes performing all the vocals.

That was not, however, the earliest recording, made for Victor on September 14, 1933, in New York City by the Noelani Hawaiian Orchestra under the title "My Little Grass Shack (Kealakekua)". The hapa haole arrangement featured lap steel guitar and ukulele. Cogswell's songwriting credit is incorrectly attributed to Rebecca Roback on the label.

Another hapa haole version pre-dated Fio Rito, recorded for Brunswick on November 11, 1933, by future Hawaiian Music Hall of Fame honoree and lap-steel guitar master Sol Hoʻopiʻi and His Novelty Quartet. Other big bands recorded the song during the 1930s, The Ben Pollack Orchestra charting with a recording made for Columbia in January, 1934.

== Style and context ==
"My Little Grass Shack" is a hapa haole song, "a hybrid genre that mixed American jazz and dance rhythms (swing and foxtrot), Hawaiian instrumentation (such as the steel guitar and ukulele), and lyrics in both English and Hawaiian" (hapa haole means "half foreign" and is also used in a literal sense to mean "multiracial"). It was written, recorded, and reached the top of the charts nearly two decades after the start of the hapa haole fad, the Hawaiian music craze, which began with the popularity of a 1912 Broadway musical, The Bird of Paradise, and exploded in earnest at the Hawaiian Pavilion at San Francisco's Panama–Pacific International Exposition in 1915.

The music craze helped promote tourism to Hawaii. "Through national songhits like 'My Little Grass Shack', hapa haole music solidified and perpetuated U.S. mainland caricatures of Hawaiʻi as a place of grass shacks, white sandy beaches, lovely hula maidens, and happy dancing natives."

Though considered a fad in 1915, hapa haole remained popular for decades. Technological innovation in travel, pop culture, and mass production helped sustain its popularity. The 1915 Exposition celebrated the opening of the Panama Canal, which made tourist access to Hawaii easier and faster. PanAm made access even easier and faster when air travel to Hawaii was inaugurated in 1936. Music was a significant element in Hawaiian culture, helping to attract visitors:

Colorful community events were staged, usually involving flowers and parades. Entertainment flourished to keep the visitors occupied. Wonderfully wacky hapa haole music was performed to ukulele and steel guitar. The tourist hula show was born... The [Hawaii Visitors] Bureau took part in many promotional activities over the years, but the most enduring and successful was launched in 1935 as the radio program, Hawaii Calls... Listeners grew up with the sounds of Hawaii from that popular show and developed lifelong desires to see and hear the real thing.

"Hawaiian music, via sheet music, the new technologies of records and radio, and live travelling performances, was a driving force for the 'Hawaii Craze' that besotted the U.S. during the first half of the 20th century." Motion pictures helped keep the fad going through the 1930s, as did television in the 1950s and 1960s. Radio was a particularly significant promotional tool. Nearly a decade before Hawaii Calls, for example, Johnny Noble led a quartet of musicians to San Francisco to promote Hawaii on radio on behalf of the main shipping line to Hawaii, Matson Lines.

The advent of mass production assembly lines contributed as well by increasing supplies and reducing prices of steel guitars and ukuleles. "Sears Roebuck bought the Harmony guitar company to make ukuleles and cash in on the craze. Hawaiian music also became incredibly popular as a result. Ukes were mass-produced in the thousands — Harmony sold 500,000 in 1931 alone."

"My Little Grass Shack" exemplifies these trends. Written for a tourist event, it possessed enduring appeal to tourists. "Everyone wanted to head to Hawaii, take up life in a grass shack, and hang out with their kane and wahine compatriots on the beach at Honaunau," says The Kona Historical Society. It was introduced to mainland audiences via Ted Fio Rito's radio remote broadcast, his recording was a number one hit, and numerous recordings followed. It was used in a number of films during the 1930s, particularly musical shorts. It appeared in television shows through the 1950s and 1960s and even more recently. It remains a standard for ukulele, again a popular instrument.

== Lyrics ==
J. P. McEvoy, a popular magazine writer and humorist in the 1920s and 1930s, wrote to the songwriters after hearing "My Little Grass Shack" on the radio. Without benefit of printed lyrics, he asked tongue-in-cheek about some of the Hawaiian place names and phrases in the song: "What does it mean? What are connies and weenies? How do ka-chewbas sway? Where is the beach at Holdem Sow? How do homesick Highland boys get to this place, and is a Fishin' Foy any relation to the late Eddie?"

Two historic locations on the Big Island of Hawaii are mentioned in the title and lyrics. Kealakekua, where the Fourth of July canoe races took place, is where English explorer James Cook was killed in 1779. The beach at Hōnaunau is now the site of Puʻuhonua o Hōnaunau National Historical Park, the best known and best preserved ancient City of Refuge.

The Hawaiian phrase in the line "I want to be with all the kanes and wahines that I used to know" means "men and women". The line, "Where the Humuhumunukunukuapua'a go swimming by," refers to the reef triggerfish, Hawaii's state fish, by its long Hawaiian name. Poi is a Hawaiian food staple made from taro root.

There is one full line in Hawaiian, "Komo mai no kāua i ka hale welakahao," which literally translates to, "Come into our house while the iron's hot." Dolly Parton, in her televised live performance of the song in 1987, shouts out after the line is sung that it means, "Come to my house, we're gonna party!"

The "little grass shack" of the title did not refer to an actual location. But the popularity of the song led to the opening of a gift shop in Kona called The Little Grass Shack. The song was so popular that soldiers stationed in Hawaii during World War II who were not allowed to write letters home instead sent photographs of themselves in front of the gift shop to let their families know where they were.

== Structure ==
The song was written in the key of B-flat major and is played in 4/4 common time, popularly known at the time as a foxtrot. Ukulele arrangements are in G major.

The main body of the song is built upon two common chord progressions (not including fills). The first is 1-2-5-1, which in Bb walks up from Bb to C7 to F7, resolving back to Bb. The first eight bars follow this progression, as do the last twelve bars (the last four of those last twelve bars repeat the melody, lyrics, and chords of the 5-1 F7-Bb resolution in the preceding four bars). The second progression, which makes up the second set of eight bars, is 3-6-2-5, D7 to G7 to C7 to F7, a form often heard in Gospel music.

After the first sixteen bars, there are variations within each progression and in their order. In this middle section, the first progression transitions directly into the second progression (D7) without resolving to Bb. The second progression resolves back to Bb rather than finishing on F7 as we enter the last twelve bars and repeat the first progression.

Most recordings begin with an instrumental introduction built upon the primary eight-bar 1-2-5-1 progression, or at least its last four bars, featuring the same melody that is later played behind the "Humuhumunukunukuapuaa" lyric. The original Noble sheet music differs. It starts with a four-bar instrumental introduction (5-1, F to Bb, with the "Humuhumunukunukuapuaa" melody) and then leads into an eight-bar vocal introduction with a unique melody that is not repeated later in the song, the lyrics setting up the theme of a homesick Hawaiian sailor yearning to return to Kona. The full Noble introduction is rarely heard among available recordings. There are examples of an introduction using the melody of another famous Hawaiian song, "Aloha ʻOe".

Big band versions present an instrumental version of the main verse before launching into the vocals, frequently following up with additional instrumental verses. Most versions in other genres that highlight vocalists launch straight into the vocals after a short 1-2-5-1 introduction.

== Cover versions ==
"My Little Grass Shack" has been recorded many times. A partial list of artists who have recorded versions include:

- Paul Whiteman (1934)
- Mills Brothers (1934)
- Dorothy Lamour (1944)
- Guy Lombardo (1949)
- Ames Brothers with Roy Smeck (1951)
- Les Paul and Mary Ford (1951)
- Annette Funicello (1960 and 2008)
- Tony Randall (1960)
- Bing Crosby recorded the song in 1961 for use on his radio show and it was subsequently included in the CD Return to Paradise Islands. Crosby also included the song in a medley on his album On the Happy Side (1962).
- Teresa Brewer (1961)
- Firehouse Five Plus Two (1961)
- Ray Charles (1962)
- Benny Goodman (1963)
- The Andrews Sisters (1965)
- Hank Snow (1967)
- June Christy
- Arthur Godfrey
- Dave Van Ronk (1973)
- Don Ho (1979)
- Leon Redbone with Ringo Starr (1994)
- Lisa Loeb (2002)
- Jesse Colin Young (2004).

== Film and television ==
"My Little Grass Shack" has been used frequently in movies, in two waves. In the first decade after the song was written, a time when Hollywood regularly produced shorts for theatrical exhibition, performances of the song were common.

- "Mike Fright" (1934): Our Gang star as The International Silver String Submarine Band crashing a youth talent show where another contestant, Joy Lane, sings "My Little Grass Shack" with four girls dancing hula and Billy Lee tap dancing (Joy Lane joined Ted Fio Rito's Orchestra in 1947).
- "Show Kids" (1935): Another short centered on a youth talent show in which Joy Lane sings the song playing the ukulele backed by hula dancers.
- "Mirrors" (1934): Features Freddie Rich and His Orchestra performing the song with Vera Van and The Eton Boys singing vocals.
- "Freddie Martin and His Orchestra" (1935): The title band performs the song.
- "Club House Party" (1935): Roy Smeck performs an instrumental version on slide guitar.
- "My Little Grass Shack" (1942): "Soundie" made up entirely of the song, the music and background vocals by Andy Iona, who played saxophone in Johnny Noble's Moana Orcherstra and the Royal Hawaiian Orchestra.
- Go For Broke! (1951): The first lines played as an act of defiance by a Nisei member of the 442nd RCT, following first meeting with their platoon's new commanding officer.

The second wave began in 1990, "My Little Grass Shack" becoming a popular movie soundtrack song, particularly for films set in Hawaii.

- The Hot Spot (1990): Instrumental version by The New Hawaiian Band.
- North (1994): Part of Marc Shaiman's Hawaii Medley.
- Runaway Bride (1999): Barbershop quartet The Hale Town Four sing a cappella in the luau scene.
- Breakfast of Champions (1999): Martin Denny's instrumental lounge version.
- 50 First Dates (2004): New version by Leon Redbone, with Ringo Starr contributing vocals, in the background of a date scene.
- Lilo & Stitch 2: Stitch Has a Glitch (2005): Soundtrack album includes Lisa Loeb cover, Lilo & Stitch Hawaiian Volume 2 includes Annette Funicello cover.
- Forgetting Sarah Marshall (2008): Instrumental version by Hawaii Tattoo, but not in the scene where Dwayne the Bartender (Da'Vone McDonald) is asked about Hawaii's state fish and answers, "Humuhumunukunukuapuaa, bitch".

On television, "My Little Grass Shack" was sometimes sung by a cast member as part of the story, sometimes accompanying themselves on ukulele, and sometimes was performed in variety shows.

- Our Miss Brooks (May 30, 1954): Osgood Conklin (Gale Gordon) sings it to convince a client to vacation in Hawaii in "The Hawkins Travel Agency".
- The George Burns and Gracie Allen Show (April 4, 1955): George Burns sings and plays the ukulele with Gracie Allen singing along in the final scene of "Gracie Tries to Select George's Next Wife".
- The Steve Allen Show (October 13, 1957): Dorothy Lamour sings.
- The Bob Cummings Show (April 22, 1958): Bertha Krause (veteran character actress Kathleen Freeman) sings it in the "Bob Sails to Hawaii" episode.
- The Lawrence Welk Show (1958): Part of the "Champagne Medley".
- You Bet Your Life (January 1, 1959): Played by Groucho Marx's orchestra.
- The Hollywood Palace (November 21, 1964): Host Arthur Godfrey sings, accompanying himself on ukulele.
- The Hollywood Palace (January 1, 1966): Bing Crosby, co-hosting with Sonny & Cher, sings with Donna Butterworth of Paradise, Hawaiian Style.
- The Odd Couple (February 2, 1973): In the episode "Myrna's Debut", Felix (Tony Randall) plays the ukulele and sings with Murray (Al Molinaro) while Myrna (Penny Marshall) tap dances in a hula skirt.
- Tony Orlando and Dawn (March 5, 1975): Performed by series hosts Tony Orlando & Dawn.
- Dolly (September 27, 1987): In the episode "My Hawaii", Dolly Parton sings "My Little Grass Shack" with local musicians and with eight girls dancing hula at the famous luau at Paradise Cove on Oahu.
- Muppets Tonight (March 8, 1987): In the premiere episode of the short-lived series, in the "Bay of Pigswatch" skit, David Hoggselhoff sings a couple of lines of "My Little Grass Shack" for Andy and Randy Pig before he collapses upon the entrance of Spamela Hamderson.
- The Simpsons (November 12, 2000): In the episode "Insane Clown Poppy", Krusty the Clown (Dan Castellaneta) tries to cheer up his estranged daughter Sophie (Drew Barrymore) by singing and playing the song on ukulele.

== Precursor and sequels ==
"My Little Grass Shack in Kealakekua, Hawaii" was originally written as a parody of the chorus of "Back in Hackensack, New Jersey", composed in 1924 by Dan A. Russo and Art L. Biner. The opening lines of the chorus are, "I wanna go back to a black little shack, back in Hackensack, New Jersey, I wanna see all the gals and pals that I used to know". The chord structure is nearly identical, the melody slightly altered. Other verses in "Hackensack", with completely different chord structures and melodies, have no corollaries in "My Little Grass Shack".

Two sequels were written to "Little Grass Shack" in 1934, Johnny Noble getting partial credit for both. "I've Found a Little Grass Skirt for My Little Grass Shack in Hawaii" is credited to Noble and Harry Owens, who took over for Noble as leader of the Royal Hawaiian Orchestra when Noble stepped down to concentrate on song publishing.

Also in 1934, Royal Hawaiian Orchestra players Lee Wood and Don McDiarmid submitted a sequel to Noble titled, "It's Just a Little Brown Gal in a Little Grass Skirt in a Little Grass Shack in Hawaii". Owens did not want to add yet another "Little Grass Shack" number to the orchestra's songbook. Noble published it, giving himself co-writing credit. He then gave it to Ray Kinney, a future Hawaiian Music Hall of Fame honoree he had worked with before. The success of Kinney's recording convinced Owens to add it to the songbook under the shortened title "Little Brown Gal". Kinney joined the Orchestra that same year. The song became an oft-covered hapa haole classic that Lee Wood himself continued to perform a half century later.

In 1950, Harry Stewart recorded "My Little Old Shack (in Minneapolis, Minnesota)" under the character name Yogi Yorgesson, substituting comic Swedish lyrics for the Hawaiian lyrics in "My Little Grass Shack". In the last line of the verse, Yorgesson sings, "When the mackerel and the pickerel and the lutefisk go swimming by."

== Bibliography ==
- Bolante, Ronna; Keany, Michael (2007). "50 Greatest Songs of Hawaii". Honolulu Magazine.
- Cooley, Timothy J. (2014). Surfing About Music. University of California Press. ISBN 978-0520276635.
- Inman, David (2006). Television Variety Shows: Histories and Episode Guides to 57 Programs. McFarland & Company. ISBN 978-0786421985.
- Kanahele, George S. (1979). Hawaiian Music and Musicians: An Illustrated History. The University Press of Hawaii. ISBN 978-0824805784.
- Melrose, Maile. "Soldiers and The Little Grass Shack in Kealakekua". Kona Historical Society.
- Noble, Gurre Ploner (1948). Hula Blues: The Story of Johnny Noble, Hawaii, Its Music and Musicians. Literary Licensing, LLC. ISBN 978-1258818135.
- Shishikura, Masaya (2007). I'll Remember You: Nostalgia and Hapa Haole Music (PDF). University of Hawaii M.A. Thesis.
- Whitcomb, Ian. "Hawaiian Memories".
- Yamashiro, Aiko (2009). "Ethics in Song: Becoming Kamaʻāina in Hapa-Haole Music" (PDF). University of Hawaiʻi-Mānoa.
