= Road to Happiness =

1942 film by Phil Rosen

- Poster for film
- Directed by: Phil Rosen
- Written by: Matt Taylor (story "First Performance"); Robert Hardy Andrews (adaptation and screenplay)
- Produced by: Scott R. Dunlap
- Starring: See below
- Cinematography: Harry Neumann
- Edited by: Carl Pierson
- Distributed by: Monogram Pictures
- Release date: 9 January 1942
- Running time: 84 minutes
- Country: United States
- Language: English

Road to Happiness is a 1942 American film directed by Phil Rosen and starring John Boles and Mona Barrie. The film is a bittersweet story of a family's road to happiness.

== Plot ==
Jeff Carter has just returned from Europe eager to see his family. Charley Grady, his agent, informs Jeff that his wife Millie has divorced him and has remarried to millionaire Sam Rankin. Jeff discovers that his narcissistic ex-wife has sent Danny to a military boarding school because she would rather socialize with her friends.

Danny is glad his father is home from his two-year baritone opera studies and is happy to live with him again, although they share one room in a boarding house. Jeff and Danny have no money and Jeff cannot find a singing job. He finds a radio job with an acting part as an Indian on a cowboy show.

Danny realizes he is in the way of his father's dream to sing and tries to push him away, but admits to his father that he can't lie to him. His father insists on continuing to act so that they can spend more time together.

While Jeff is rehearsing for the acting show, next door there is a musical radio show but the singer is taken sick. Danny sees an opportunity for his father to break into singing career again, and recommends Jeff to cover the singer. Jeff is given the opportunity. Danny calls Jeff's agent to share the news, who goes to the music producer and makes him listen to Jeff on the radio.

The music producer is eager to sign a contract with Jeff. Jeff gets his chance to sing opera again and signs a contract with a big music company. Danny and Jeff live happily together now that Jeff has a career again.

== Cast ==
- John Boles as Jeff Carter
- Mona Barrie as Millie Rankin
- Billy Lee as Danny Carter
- Roscoe Karns as Charley Grady
- Lillian Elliott as Mrs. Price
- Paul Porcasi as Pietro Pacelli
- Selmer Jackson as Sam Rankin
- Brandon Hurst as Swayne
- Sam Flint as Colonel Gregory
- Antonio Filauri as Almonti
- Harland Tucker as Foster

== Soundtrack ==
- John Boles – "Danny Boy"
- John Boles – "Vision Fugitive" (aria from Massenet's "Herodiade")
- John Boles – "America"
