= Melody in Spring =

1934 film by Norman Z. McLeod

- Directed by: Norman Z. McLeod
- Screenplay by: Benn W. Levy; Frank Leon Smith; Jane Storm
- Produced by: Douglas MacLean
- Starring: Lanny Ross; Charlie Ruggles; Mary Boland; Ann Sothern; George Meeker; Herman Bing; Norma Mitchell
- Cinematography: Henry Sharp
- Edited by: Richard C. Currier
- Production company: Paramount Pictures
- Distributed by: Paramount Pictures
- Release date: April 20, 1934
- Running time: 71 minutes
- Country: United States
- Language: English

Melody in Spring is a 1934 American pre-Code musical film directed by Norman Z. McLeod and written by Benn W. Levy, Frank Leon Smith, and Jane Storm. The film stars Lanny Ross, Charlie Ruggles, Mary Boland, Ann Sothern, George Meeker, and Herman Bing. The film was released on April 20, 1934, by Paramount Pictures.

== Cast ==
- Lanny Ross as John Craddock
- Charlie Ruggles as Warren Blodgett
- Mary Boland as Mary Blodgett
- Ann Sothern as Jane Blodgett
- George Meeker as Wesley Prebble
- Herman Bing as Wirt
- Wade Boteler as Anton
- Thomas E. Jackson as House Detective
- William Irving as Mr. Shorter
