= Charlie Ruggles =

American actor (1886–1970)

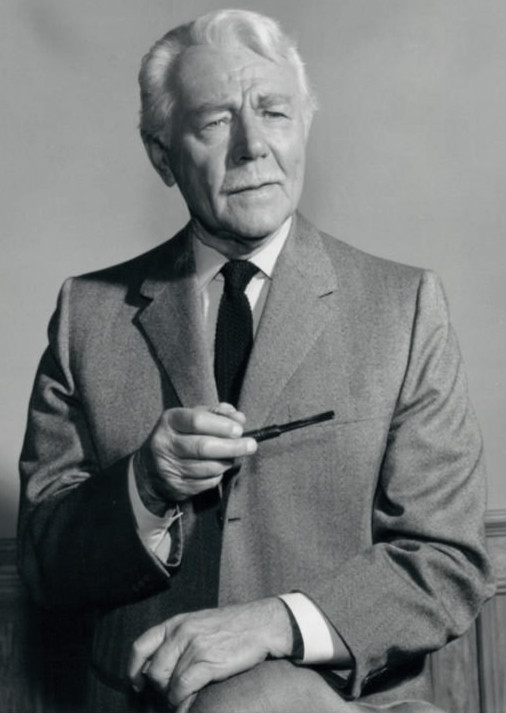
- Publicity photo of Ruggles from his guest appearance on The Dick Powell Show (1963)
- Born: Charles Sherman Ruggles; February 8, 1886; Los Angeles, California, U.S.
- Died: December 23, 1970 (aged 84); Santa Monica, California, U.S.
- Resting place: Forest Lawn Memorial Park
- Occupation: Actor
- Years active: 1905–1968
- Spouses: Adele Rowland (m. 1914; div. 1916) Barbara Guillan (died 1941) Marion LaBarba (m. 1942)

Charles Sherman Ruggles (February 8, 1886 – December 23, 1970) was an American comic character actor. In a career spanning six decades, Ruggles appeared in close to 100 feature films, often in mild-mannered and comic roles. He was also the elder brother of director, producer, and silent film actor Wesley Ruggles (1889–1972).

== Career ==
Ruggles was born in Los Angeles, California, in 1886. Despite training to be a doctor, Ruggles soon found himself on the stage, appearing in a stock production of Nathan Hale in 1905. In 1912, he worked in the stock company at Alcazar Theatre in San Francisco in a stage production of The Dawn of a Tomorrow. At Los Angeles's Majestic Theatre, he played Private Jo Files in L. Frank Baum and Louis F. Gottschalk's musical The Tik-Tok Man of Oz in 1913.

He moved to Broadway to appear in Help Wanted in 1914. His first screen role came in the silent Peer Gynt the following year. Throughout the 1910s and 1920s, Ruggles continued to appear in silent movies, though his passion remained the stage, appearing in long-running productions such as The Passing Show of 1918, Battling Buttler, and Avery Hopwood's The Demi-Virgin and Ladies' Night in a Turkish Bath. One of his most famous stage hits was Queen High, one of his last before a nearly 30-year hiatus, produced in 1926. He also played Peter Braley in Spring Is Here, which ran for 104 performances in 1929.

From 1929, Ruggles appeared in talking pictures. His first was Gentleman of the Press in which he played a comic, alcoholic newspaper reporter. Throughout the 1930s, he was teamed with comic actress Mary Boland in a string of domestic farces, notably If I Had a Million, Six of a Kind, Ruggles of Red Gap, and People Will Talk. Ruggles is best remembered today as the big-game hunter in Bringing Up Baby and billionaire Michael J. "Mike" O'Connor in It Happened on Fifth Avenue.

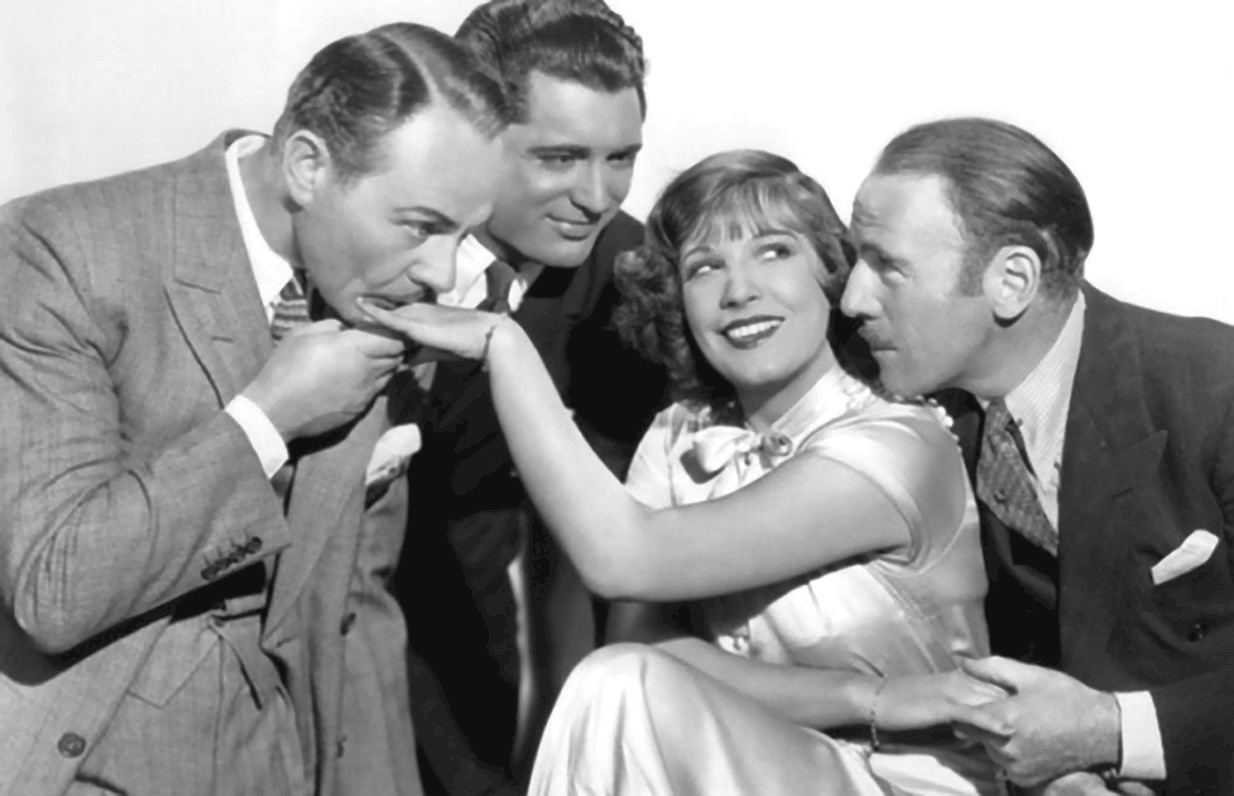
Ruggles (far left) with Cary Grant (2nd from left), Lili Damita (center), and Roland Young (right) in film This is the Night (1932)

In 1944, he had a summer radio series, The Charlie Ruggles Show on CBS.

In 1949, Ruggles halted his film career to return to the stage and to move into television. He was the headline character in the TV series The Ruggles (1949–52), a family comedy in which he played a character also called Charlie Ruggles and was again the headline character in the daily sitcom The World of Mr. Sweeney, which ran for 345 episodes in 1954–55.

Ruggles returned to the big screen in 1961, playing Charles McKendrick in The Parent Trap and Mackenzie Savage in The Pleasure of His Company. In the latter film, he reprised the role for which he had won a Tony Award in 1959. In 1963 he memorably played the grandfather of the silent film star Corinne Griffith in Papa's Delicate Condition. Griffith had written the book of her early life on which the film is based.

Ruggles made guest appearances in episodes of various television series through the 1950s and 1960s, such as a time-traveling librarian in "Man from 1997," a 1956 science fiction episode of the television series Conflict, and a 1961 appearance as a wealthy neighbor who offers to finance a European trip for Hassie McCoy on The Real McCoys, in the season 5 episode "Hassie's European Tour". Ruggles had a recurring guest role on The Beverly Hillbillies in the mid-1960s as Lowell Redlings Farquhar, father-in-law of Milburn Drysdale (Raymond Bailey). Ruggles also played Aunt Clara's (Marion Lorne) old flame, the warlock Hedley Partridge, as well as a Mr. Caldwell, whose company marketed soup, in the television series Bewitched. In Wagon Train, he played Jameson Hershey, the owner of an elderly horse, Herman, that joins up with the wagon train. He played Congressman John Canfield on an episode of The Andy Griffith Show called "Aunt Bee, The Swinger" and appeared as a driving instructor on The Munsters. Ruggles also lent his voice to the "Aesop and Son" features in Jay Ward's The Rocky and Bullwinkle Show.

One of Ruggles' last television appearances before his death was a starring role in the syndicated television special The Wonder Circus, where he played Charlie Wonder, a retired ringmaster who talked about his life leading a circus.

== Personal life ==
His marriage to Adele Rowland (1914–1916) ended in divorce after two years. He then married Barbara Guillan and they remained married until her death in 1941. He married Marion LaBarba in 1942; the couple remained wed until his death in 1970.

== Death ==
Ruggles died of cancer at Saint John's Health Center in Santa Monica, California, on December 23, 1970, at the age of 84.

He is interred at Forest Lawn Memorial Park in Glendale, California in the Garden of Memory near his brother Wesley Ruggles.

== Legacy ==
Charlie Ruggles has three stars on the Hollywood Walk of Fame: one for his contributions to motion pictures on 6200 Hollywood Boulevard, one for his radio work on 6300 Hollywood Boulevard, and one for television on 1600 Vine Street.

== Complete filmography ==
- The Patchwork Girl of Oz (1914) – Minor Role (unconfirmed)
- The Majesty of the Law (1915) – Lawrence Evans
- Peer Gynt (1915) – The Button Molder
- The Reform Candidate (1915) – Loony Jim
- The Heart Raider (1923) – Gaspard McMahon (an insurance clerk)
- Gentlemen of the Press (1929) – Charlie Haven
- The Lady Lies (1929) – Charlie Tayler
- The Battle of Paris (1929) – Zizi
- Roadhouse Nights (1930) – Willie Bindbugel
- Young Man of Manhattan (1930) – Shorty Ross
- Queen High (1930) – T. Boggs Johns
- Her Wedding Night (1930) – Bertie Bird
- Charley's Aunt (1930) – Lord Fancourt Babberley
- Honor Among Lovers (1931) – Monty Dunn
- The Smiling Lieutenant (1931) – Max
- The Girl Habit (1931) – Charlie Floyd
- The Beloved Bachelor (1931) – Jerry Wells
- Husband's Holiday (1931) – Clyde Saunders
- This Reckless Age (1932) – Goliath Whitney
- One Hour with You (1932) – Adolph
- This Is the Night (1932) – Bunny West
- Make Me a Star (1932) – Charles Ruggles (uncredited)
- Love Me Tonight (1932) – Viscount Gilbert de Varèze
- 70,000 Witnesses (1932) – Johnny Moran
- The Night of June 13 (1932) – Philo Strawn
- Trouble in Paradise (1932) – The Major
- Evenings for Sale (1932) – Bimpfl
- If I Had a Million (1932) – Henry Peabody
- Madame Butterfly (1932) – Lt. Barton
- Murders in the Zoo (1933) – Peter Yates
- Terror Aboard (1933) – Blackie Witherspoon
- Melody Cruise (1933) – Pete Wells
- Mama Loves Papa (1933) – Wilbur Todd
- Goodbye Love (1933) – Oswald Groggs
- Girl Without a Room (1933) – Vergil Crock
- Alice in Wonderland (1933) – March Hare
- Six of a Kind (1933) – J. Pinkham Whinney
- Melody in Spring (1934) – Warren Blodgett
- Murder in the Private Car (1934) – Godfrey D. Scott
- Friends of Mr. Sweeney (1934) – Asaph 'Ace' Holliday
- The Pursuit of Happiness (1934) – Aaron Kirkland
- Ruggles of Red Gap (1935) – Egbert Floud
- People Will Talk (1935) – Henry Wilton
- No More Ladies (1935) – Edgar
- The Big Broadcast of 1936 (1935) – Wilbur Sealingsworth
- Anything Goes (1936) – Moonface Martin
- The Preview Murder Mystery (1936) – Charles Ruggles (uncredited)
- Early to Bed (1936) – Chester Beatty
- Hearts Divided (1936) – Henry
- Yours for the Asking (1936) – Sunbather (uncredited)
- Hollywood Boulevard (1936) – Himself – Actor – Cameo Appearance (uncredited)
- Wives Never Know (1936) – Homer Bigelow
- Mind Your Own Business (1936) – Orville Shanks
- Turn Off the Moon (1937) – J. Elliott Dinwiddy
- Exclusive (1937) – Tod Swain
- Bringing Up Baby (1938) – Major Applegate
- Hollywood Handicap (1938, Short) – Himself
- Screen Snapshots Series 17, No. 12 (1938, Documentary short) – Himself
- Breaking the Ice (1938) – Samuel Terwilliger
- Service de Luxe (1938) – Scott Robinson
- His Exciting Night (1938) – Adam Tripp
- Boy Trouble (1939) – Homer C. Fitch
- Sudden Money (1939) – Sweeney J. Patterson
- Invitation to Happiness (1939) – Henry 'Pop' Hardy
- Night Work (1939) – Homer C. Fitch
- Balalaika (1939) – Nicki Popoff
- The Farmer's Daughter (1940) – Nickie North
- Opened by Mistake (1940) – Buzz Nelson
- Maryland (1940) – Dick Piper
- Public Deb No. 1 (1940) – Milburn
- No Time for Comedy (1940) – Philo Swift
- The Invisible Woman (1940) – George
- Honeymoon for Three (1941) – Harvey Wilson
- Model Wife (1941) – Milo Everett
- The Parson of Panamint (1941) – Chuckawalla Bill Redfield
- Go West, Young Lady (1941) – Jim Pendergast
- The Perfect Snob (1941) – Dr. Edgar Mason
- Friendly Enemies (1942) – Heinrich Block
- Dixie Dugan (1943) – Pa Dugan
- The Shining Future (1944, Short) – Mr. Ames
- The Road to Victory (1944, Short) – Mr. Ames (uncredited)
- The Doughgirls (1944) – Stanley Slade
- Our Hearts Were Young and Gay (1944) – Otis Skinner
- Three Is a Family (1944) – Sam Whitaker
- Bedside Manner (1945) – Dr. J.H. 'Doc' Fredericks
- Incendiary Blonde (1945) – Cherokee Jim
- A Stolen Life (1946) – Freddie Linley
- Gallant Journey (1946) – Jim Montgomery
- The Perfect Marriage (1947) – Dale Williams, Sr.
- My Brother Talks to Horses (1947) – Richard Pennington Roeder
- Ramrod (1947) – Ben Dickason
- It Happened on 5th Avenue (1947) – Michael J. O'Connor
- Give My Regards to Broadway (1948) – Toby Helper
- The Lovable Cheat (1949) – Claude Mercadet
- Look for the Silver Lining (1949) – Caro 'Pop' Miller
- Ben and Me (1953, Short) – Ben Franklin (voice, uncredited)
- The Bells of St. Mary's (1959, TV movie) – Horace Bogardus
- Once Upon a Christmas Time (1959, TV movie) – Mayor
- All in a Night's Work (1961) – Dr. Warren Kingsley Sr.
- The Parent Trap (1961) – Charles McKendrick
- The Pleasure of His Company (1961) – Mackenzie Savage
- The Ginger Rogers Show (1961, TV movie) – Eli Harcourt
- Ernestine (1962, TV movie)
- Son of Flubber (1963) – Judge Murdock
- Papa's Delicate Condition (1963) – Anthony Ghio
- I'd Rather Be Rich (1964) – Dr. Charles Crandall
- The Ugly Dachshund (1966) – Dr. J.L. Pruitt
- Follow Me, Boys! (1966) – John Everett Hughes
- Carousel (1967, TV movie) – The Starkeeper / Dr. Selden

== Television credits ==
- Father Knows Best (1960) (1 episode) as Jim's co-worker
- Rocky and His Friends (1960–1961) as Voice of Aesop (uncredited)
- The Bullwinkle Show (1961) as Voice of Aesop (uncredited)
- The Real McCoys (1961) as Mr. Deveraux
- Burke's Law (1963–1964) as O.B. Danberry / Charles Wingfield / I.A. Bugg / Mr. Gregory
- My Living Doll (1964, "I'll Leave It to You") as Jonas Clay
- Beverly Hillbillies (1964) as Mrs. Drysdale's father, Lowell Redlings Farquhar in the episodes "Mrs. Drysdale's Father" and "Mr. Farquhar Stays On"
- Bewitched as Mr. Caldwell (1964, episode: "Help Help, Don't Save Me") and Hedley Partridge (1965, episode: "Aunt Clara's Old Flame")
- Wagon Train as Mr. Caldwell (1965, episode:"Herman")
- The Man from U.N.C.L.E. (1965) (1 episode) as Governor Callahan
- The Andy Griffith Show (1965) (episode "Aunt Bee, The Swinger") as John Canfield
- The Munsters (1965) (1 episode, "Herman's Driving Test") as Charlie Wiggens
- Bonanza (1966) (1 episode, "Horse of a Different Hue") as Col. Robert Fairchild
- The Wonder Circus (1966) (television special) as Charlie Wonder
- The Danny Thomas Hour (1968) (1 episode, "One for My Baby") as Stimson

== Radio appearances ==
Year	Program	Episode/source
1942	Suspense	The Burning Court
1942	Philip Morris Playhouse	Friendly Enemies
