= Two-Fisted =

1935 film by James Cruze

- Directed by: James Cruze
- Screenplay by: Sam Hellman; Francis Martin; Eddie Moran
- Based on: Is Zat So? (play) by James Gleason; Richard Taber
- Produced by: Harold Hurley
- Starring: Lee Tracy; Roscoe Karns; Gail Patrick; Kent Taylor; Grace Bradley; Billy Lee
- Cinematography: Harry Fischbeck
- Edited by: James Smith
- Production company: Paramount Pictures
- Distributed by: Paramount Pictures
- Release date: October 4, 1935
- Running time: 60 minutes
- Country: United States
- Language: English

Two-Fisted is a 1935 American comedy film directed by James Cruze and written by Sam Hellman, Francis Martin and Eddie Moran. The film stars Lee Tracy, Roscoe Karns, Gail Patrick, Kent Taylor, Grace Bradley and Billy Lee. It was released on October 4, 1935, by Paramount Pictures.

== Cast ==
- Lee Tracy as Hap Hurley
- Roscoe Karns as Chick Moran
- Gail Patrick as Sue Parker
- Kent Taylor as Clint Blackburn
- Grace Bradley as Marie
- Billy Lee as Jimmy Parker
- G. P. Huntley as Major Fitz-Stanley
- Akim Tamiroff as Taxi Driver
- Gordon Westcott as George Parker
- Samuel S. Hinds as Mr. Pritchard
- Sarah Edwards as Abigail Adams
- Lillian Leighton as Mrs. Mason
- Ferdinand Munier as Jerry Mason
- Irving Bacon as Brick Briggs

== Reception ==
In a review for The New York Times, critic Thomas M. Pryor remarked that Two-Fisted was antiquated in its humor but praised Tracy's lead performance.

Variety wrote that the film would make "a fairly good supporting feature." It commented that it didn't succeed in its dramatic or romantic scenes and noted, "Its deficiency in the romantic aspects can be overlooked in favor of some of the laughter the picture throws off."

In their December, 1935 edition, Modern Screen gave the film a three-star review saying "This is your picture if you like ‘em with a punch." Gail Patrick was described as "an attractive feminine foil" to Lee Tracy and Roscoe Karns, and concluded that "the cast is competent and though the plot has its weak moments, you’ll be too helpless from laughing to care."
