= Too Many Parents =

1936 film by Robert F. McGowan

- Directed by: Robert F. McGowan
- Screenplay by: Virginia Van Upp; Doris Malloy
- Story by: Jesse Lynch Williams; George Templeton
- Produced by: A.M. Botsford
- Starring: Frances Farmer; Lester Matthews; Porter Hall; Henry Travers; Billy Lee; George Ernest; Sherwood Bailey
- Cinematography: Karl Struss
- Edited by: Edward Dmytryk
- Music by: Gerard Carbonara; Tom Satterfield
- Production company: Paramount Pictures
- Distributed by: Paramount Pictures
- Release date: March 30, 1936
- Running time: 73 minutes
- Country: United States
- Language: English

Too Many Parents is a 1936 American comedy film directed by Robert F. McGowan, written by Virginia Van Upp and Doris Malloy, and starring Frances Farmer (in her film debut), Lester Matthews, Porter Hall, Henry Travers, Billy Lee, George Ernest and Sherwood Bailey. It was released on March 30, 1936, by Paramount Pictures.

== Cast ==
- Frances Farmer as Sally Colman
- Lester Matthews as Mark Stewart
- Porter Hall as Mrs. Saunders
- Henry Travers as Wilkins
- Billy Lee as Billy Miller
- George Ernest as Phillip Stewart
- Sherwood Bailey as Clarence Talbot Jr.
- Douglas Scott as Morton Downing
- Colin Tapley as Miller
- Buster Phelps as Clinton Meadows
- Howard C. Hickman as Colonel Colman
- Sylvia Breamer as Malloy
- Ann Evers as Clara
- Doris Lloyd as Mrs. Downing
- Lois Kent as Morton's Sister
- Jonathan Hale as Judge
- Carl Switzer as Kid Singer
- Anne Grey as Miss Allison
- Henry Roquemore as Belcher
- Cal Tjader as Alfred
