= Six of a Kind =

1934 film by Leo McCarey

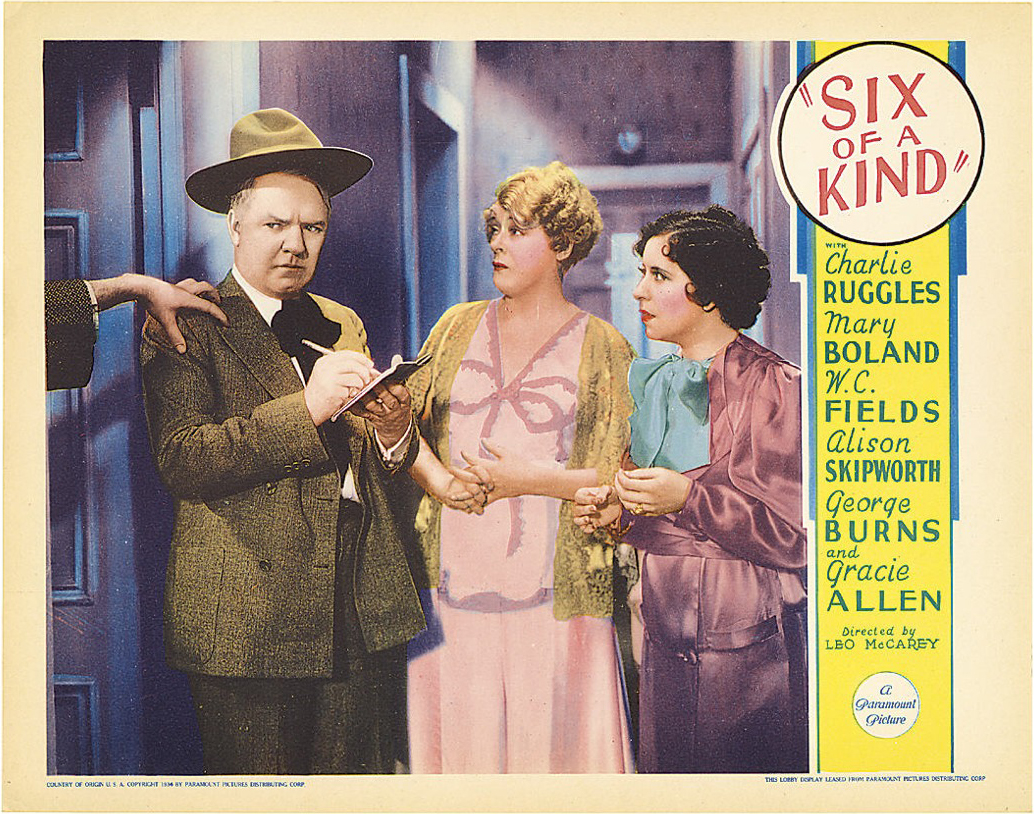
- Lobby card
- Directed by: Leo McCarey
- Written by: Keene Thompson; Douglas MacLean; Walter DeLeon; Harry Ruskin
- Starring: Charles Ruggles; Mary Boland; W.C. Fields; George Burns; Gracie Allen
- Cinematography: Henry Sharp
- Edited by: LeRoy Stone
- Music by: John Leipold (uncredited); Ralph Rainger (uncredited)
- Distributed by: Paramount Pictures
- Release date: February 9, 1934
- Running time: 62 minutes
- Country: United States
- Language: English

Six of a Kind is an American 1934 pre-Code comedy film directed by Leo McCarey and starring Charles Ruggles, Mary Boland, W.C. Fields, George Burns, and Gracie Allen.

A critical and box office success, Six of a Kind features the famous pocket billiards (pool) playing scene in which Fields explains how he got the name "Honest John".

== Plot ==
Married for twenty years, J. Pinkham and Flora Whinney prepare to embark on a long-awaited second honeymoon, destination Hollywood, California. Flora, a housewife, and "Pinky", a bank clerk, have normalized the exchange of petty insults during their marriage, rituals that have obscured expression of their genuine affection. They anticipate escaping from their middle-class conventionality and reanimating their intimacy on a two-week "gypsy interlude".

Pinky, who freely shares his planned itinerary at work, is enlisted by a shady colleague, Ferguson, to transport a suitcase on the journey to their first stop in their itinerary in Glen Falls, New York (fictional). The gullible Pinky does not suspect that Ferguson has placed $50,000 in cash from the bank vault in his suitcase; Ferguson plans to secretly intercept the couple and switch bags in Glen Falls, implicating the McWhinneys in the heist, while he escapes. Flora, an inveterate miser, advertises for a compatible couple to join them on the trip to trim expenses. The pair who respond to the offer are an unmarried twosome, George Edward and Grace Devore ("Gracie for short"), who are accompanied by their enormous Great Dane, Rang Tang Tang. The couple, especially Gracie, turn out to be certifiable eccentrics. Their gigantic dog is content only when sitting in the front seat of the car. The Whinneys carefully arranged honeymoon is quickly thrown into disarray.

The unmarried status of George and Grace affronts the conventionality of the Whinneys with regard to sleeping arrangements. As such, the foursome sleep dormitory style, the two females and two males segregating at bedtime. The situation deprives Pinky and Flora of the intimate solitude they had desired, now forcing them to arrange opportunistic trysts.

After suffering a near disastrous accident at the Grand Canyon and a holdup by hobos, the nomads arrive in Nuggetville, Nevada (fictional). Running low on cash, Pinky wires his bank for a withdrawal. The bank, aware of the robbery and suspecting the Whinneys, alerts law enforcement of their whereabouts; investigators are dispatched. In the remote mining town, the McWhinneys take rooms at the local hotel presided over by proprietress Mrs. K. Rumford known as "The Duchess". She suspects the couple of being indigent because they are cash-strapped and places their valise under lock and key in case they depart without paying. She discovers the $50,000, and contacts the proper authorities, rather than the local Sheriff "Honest John" Hoxley, an irredeemable drunkard. She dares not enlist him in the investigation. However, despite her disapproval, she has routinely kept Hoxley in liquor by loaning him money.

The climax is reached when Pinky is arrested by detectives. The valise reveals not only the cash, but a negligee: Flora momentarily concludes that her husband is having an affair and planned to abscond with a mistress and the money. Ferguson is accidentally locked in the hotel baggage cage by Pinky, and taken into custody by authorities. The negligee turns out to be that of Ferguson's girlfriend. The McWhinneys are cleared of guilt and have a rapprochement. George and Gracie take leave of the McKinneys and depart for Hollywood.

== Production ==
Director Leo McCarey, who had apprenticed as a third-assistant to filmmaker Tod Browning during the silent era, had also been schooled in managing Browning's alcohol consumption on the set. During the filming of Six of a Kind, McCarey had to contend with the notoriously hard-drinking W. C. Fields. Fields registered a complaint with Paramount executives that his character, Sheriff "Honest John" Hoxley, did not appear until late into the screenplay, providing him with less material than the other players. McCarey placated Fields by allowing him to enlarge his role by ad-libbing. Thorton Delehanty of The New York Post noted the impact on W. C. Fields' performance:

Mr. Fields himself, if left to his own devices, can win our unqualified recommendation for any picture he is in, and the current film he is in provides him generously with elbow room."

Film historian Wes D. Gehring observes that "despite limited screen time, Fields steals the show."

Gehring adds that the struggle for primacy between McCarey and Fields during Six of a Kind may have prompted studios subsequently to "hire two directors for his pictures—one for the volatile comedian, and one for everyone else."

== Reception ==
Critic Kate Cameron in a New York Daily News review entitled "New Paramount Film Greeted With Roars [of laughter]" reported that "Leo McCary has a genius for putting over comedy gags and situations..."

The Hollywood Reporter declared "Paramount's Six of a Kind [is] swarming with everything that makes people laugh. Directed with expert calculation."

== Gag routines and burlesque ==
The opening credit sequence introduces the six central characters with images of playing cards—each a joker—and cuts to portraits coupling Ruggles with Boland, Burns with Allen, and Fields with Skipworth.

=== The Grand Canyon gag ===
Gracie has placed the reluctant Flora on a weight-reducing program. To document Flora's "before" appearance, Gracie positions her on the rim of the one-mile deep canyon for a portrait. Flora is encouraged to back away from the stationary Gracie in order to bring the camera image into focus. Flora predictably backs off the edge and plunges into the abyss. Miraculously, she is caught in the limbs of the only tree growing on the face of the cliff. Moments after her rescue, Pinky is shoved over edge by the exuberant Rang Tang Tang and is rescued from the same tree. Poague notes that, thematically, "the metaphor is clear," namely "You can go to far (literally, 'out on a limb') in accommodating yourself to convention (having your picture taken), and if you go far enough your very life will be endangered."

=== The pool table routine ===
In a demonstration of W. C. Fields' "marvelous pantomime," the actor reprises the vaudeville skit he conceived in 1905. and had famously performed for the Ziegfeld Follies. As Fields putters about the table, painstakingly picking a billiard cue, meticulously chalking it and preparing his grip, he "pokes spasmodically at the cue ball", which rebounds to hit him in the head. During this pantomime, Fields relates how he got the name "Honest John" concerning the discovery of a man's lost prosthetic eye.

Fields ineptitude as a lawman contributes to the salvation of the Whinneys, as his delays and diversions lead to the capture of the criminal Ferguson and the couples' exoneration.

== Theme ==
Six of a Kind explores the comic possibilities that emerge when social conventionality clashes with independent or eccentric personalities. In contrast to his 1933 comedy Duck Soup, in which McCarey champions the central characters who defy "social rigidity," here he presents the obverse. Film critic Leland Poague writes:

Six of a Kind shows us the other side of McCarey's comic coin, for it focuses on characters who are tested by the intrusion of the unconventional into their otherwise over-conventional lives.

Poague adds: "McCarey reflects upon the necessary relationship between conventional and unconventional behavior. Either sort of behavior, carried to extremes, can be dangerous...And each sort of behavior is necessary to balance and humanize the other."

According to film historian Wes. D. Gehring, Six of a Kind introduced a soon popular "on-the-road"-themed story which appeared in filmmaker Frank Capra's 1934 romance-comedy It Happened One Night starring Claudette Colbert and Clark Gable.

== Cast ==
- Charles Ruggles (as Charlie Ruggles) - J. Pinkham Whinney
- Mary Boland - Flora Whinney
- George Burns - George Edward
- Gracie Allen - Gracie Devore
- W.C. Fields - Sheriff John Hoxley
- Alison Skipworth - Mrs. K. Rumford
- Phil Tead - Clerk in Newspaper Office

== Sources ==
- Gehring, Wes D. 2005. Leo McCarey: From Marx to McCarthy. The Scarecrow Press. Lantham, Maryland, Toronto, Oxford. ISBN 0-8108-5263-2
- Hooper, Gary and Poague, Leland. 1980. Leo McCarey Filmography in The Hollywood Professionals: Wilder and McCarey, Volume 7. The Tanvity Press, A. S. Barnes and Company, Inc. San Diego, California. pp. 295–314 ISBN 978-0498021817
- Poague, Leland. 1980. The Hollywood Professionals: Wilder and McCarey, Volume 7. The Tanvity Press, A. S. Barnes and Company, Inc. San Diego, California. ISBN 978-0498021817
- Schwartz, Dennis. 2019. Six of a Kind. Dennis Schwartz Movie Reviews, August 5, 2019. https://dennisschwartzreviews.com/sixofakind/ Retrieved 10 April 2024.
