= The Pursuit of Happiness (1934 film) =

1934 American comedy film directed by Alexander Hall

- Directed by: Alexander Hall
- Screenplay by: Stephen Morehouse Avery; J.P. McEvoy; Virginia Van Upp
- Produced by: Arthur Hornblow Jr.
- Starring: Francis Lederer; Joan Bennett; Charlie Ruggles; Mary Boland; Walter Kingsford; Minor Watson; Adrian Morris
- Cinematography: Karl Struss
- Edited by: James Smith
- Music by: Heinz Roemheld; Tom Satterfield
- Production company: Paramount Pictures
- Distributed by: Paramount Pictures
- Release date: September 28, 1934
- Running time: 75 minutes
- Country: United States
- Language: English

The Pursuit of Happiness is a 1934 American historical comedy film directed by Alexander Hall and written by Stephen Morehouse Avery, J.P. McEvoy and Virginia Van Upp. The film stars Francis Lederer, Joan Bennett, Charlie Ruggles, Mary Boland, Walter Kingsford, Minor Watson and Adrian Morris. The film was released on September 28, 1934, by Paramount Pictures.

== Plot ==
A Hessian soldier serving with British forces during the American Revolutionary War deserts and tries to settle down in Connecticut with a local woman he has met.

== Cast ==
- Francis Lederer as Max Christmann
- Joan Bennett as Prudence Kirkland
- Charlie Ruggles as Aaron Kirkland
- Mary Boland as Comfort Kirkland
- Walter Kingsford as Rev. Lyman Banks
- Minor Watson as Col. Sherwood
- Adrian Morris as Thad Jennings
- Barbara Barondess as Meg Mallory
- Duke York as Jonathan
- Burr Caruth as Rev. Myles
- Jules Cowles as The Drunk
- Irving Bacon as Bijah
- Spencer Charters as Sam Evans
- Holmes Herbert as Gen. Sir Henry Clinton
- Henry Mowbray as King George III (uncredited)
- Edward Peil Sr. as Peddler (uncredited)

== See also ==
- List of films about the American Revolution
- List of television series and miniseries about the American Revolution
- Life, Liberty and the pursuit of Happiness, quote from the United States Declaration of Independence
