= Boy Trouble =

1939 film by George Archainbaud

- Film poster
- Directed by: George Archainbaud
- Written by: Laura Perelman
- Produced by: William Le Baron; William H. Wright
- Starring: Charles Ruggles; Mary Boland; Donald O'Connor; Joyce Mathews
- Cinematography: Henry Sharp
- Edited by: Alma Macrorie
- Music by: Charles Bradshaw; John Leipold
- Production company: Paramount Pictures
- Distributed by: Paramount Pictures
- Release date: January 27, 1939
- Running time: 75 minutes
- Country: United States
- Language: English

Boy Trouble is a 1939 American comedy drama film directed by George Archainbaud and starring Charles Ruggles, Mary Boland, Donald O'Connor, and Billy Lee. Archainbaud also directed the sequel to the film, Night Work, that was released the same year.

== Plot ==
Sybil Fitch adopts two orphan boys. Her husband is infuriated. However, when the boys catch scarlet fever, he finds that he really does love them.

== Cast ==
- Charles Ruggles as Homer C. Fitch
- Mary Boland as Sybil Fitch
- Donald O'Connor as Butch
- Joyce Mathews as Patricia Fitch
- John Hartley as Wyndham Wilson
- Billy Lee as Joe
- Andrew Tombes as Mr. Svively
- Dick Elliott as Dr. Benshlager
- Zeffie Tilbury as Mrs. Jepson
- Sarah Edwards as Mrs. Moots
- Harlan Briggs as Mr. Pike
