= Evenings for Sale =

1932 film

- Theatrical release poster
- Directed by: Stuart Walker
- Screenplay by: S.K. Lauren; Agnes Brand Leahy; I. A. R. Wylie
- Starring: Herbert Marshall; Sari Maritza; Charlie Ruggles; Mary Boland; George Barbier; Bert Roach
- Cinematography: Harry Fischbeck
- Production company: Paramount Pictures
- Distributed by: Paramount Pictures
- Release date: November 12, 1932
- Running time: 66 minutes
- Country: United States
- Language: English

Evenings for Sale is a 1932 American pre-Code comedy film directed by Stuart Walker and written by S.K. Lauren, Agnes Brand Leahy and I. A. R. Wylie. The film stars Herbert Marshall, Sari Maritza, Charlie Ruggles, Mary Boland, George Barbier and Bert Roach. The film was released on November 12, 1932, by Paramount Pictures.

== Plot ==
Impoverished Count von Degenthal plans to commit suicide and spends his last night at a costume ball. There he meets lovely Lela Fischer and falls in love with her. A chance meeting with his former butler brings a job offer as a gigolo in a dance club. He dances with Jenny Kent, a wealthy American heiress, and she becomes so enamoured with him that she buys his castle, clearing all his debts. The count gives her his family's treasured ring in gratitude for her great sincerity. Lela decides to visit him, but overhears Bimpfl deceiving her into believing that this was the count's way of expressing his understanding of their engagement to be married. He does so merely to try and secure a serving position in their household. Naturally, Lela believes it too. Kent receives news from America that she has become a grandmother, and it dawns on her that she has been foolish in pursuing a much younger man. She returns to America, after telling Bimpfl of her plans to turn the mansion into an hôtel. Lela's misunderstanding is cleared up, and she and the count reconcile.

== Cast ==
- Herbert Marshall as Count Franz von Degenthal
- Sari Maritza as Lela Fischer
- Charlie Ruggles as Bimpfl
- Mary Boland as Jenny Kent
- George Barbier as Henrich Fischer
- Bert Roach as Otto Volk
- Lucien Littlefield as Schwenk
- Clay Clement as Von Trask
- Arnold Korff as Ritter
