= Evelyn Keyes =

American actress

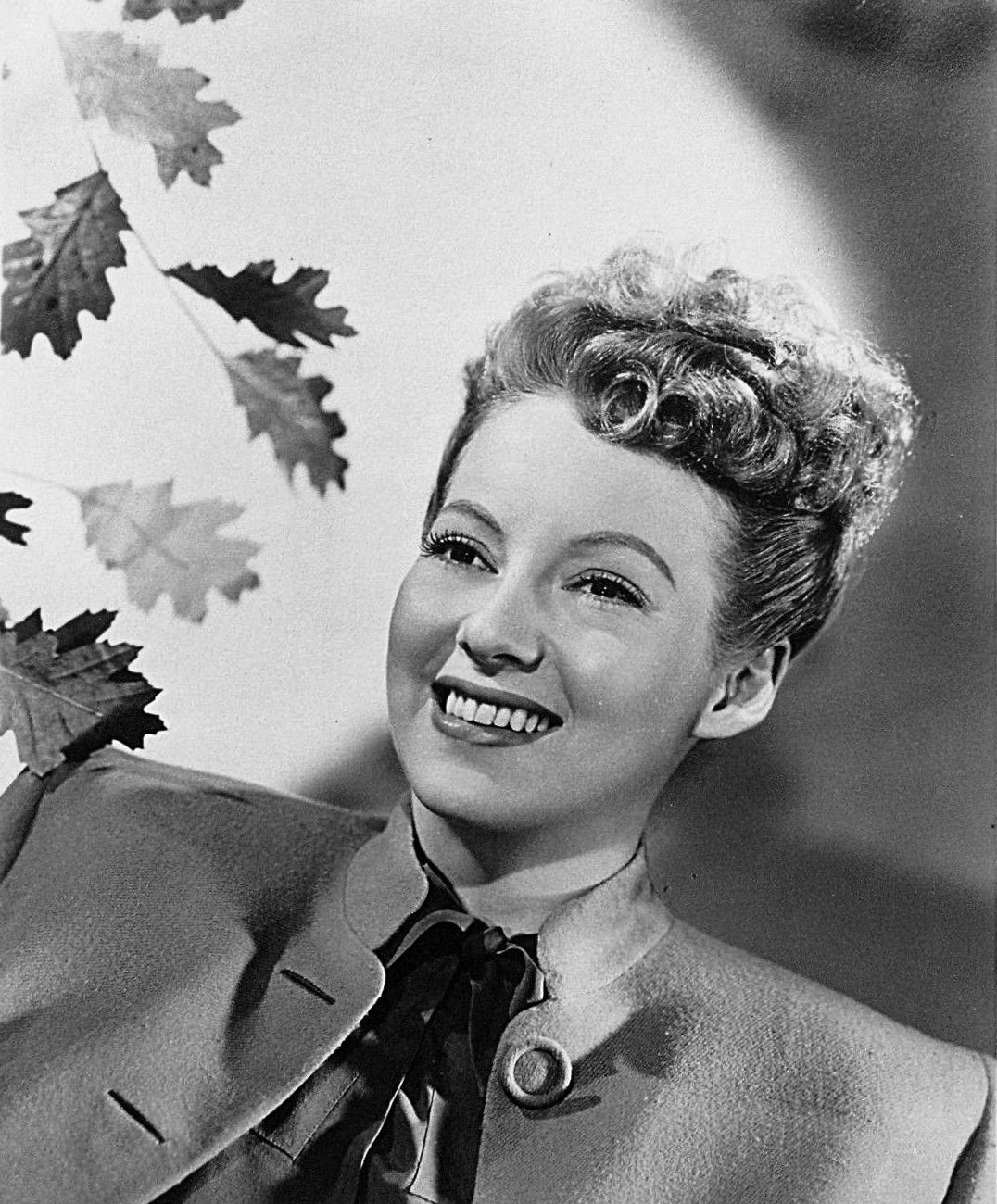
- Keyes c. 1940s
- Born: Evelyn Louise Keyes; November 20, 1916; Port Arthur, Texas, U.S.
- Died: July 4, 2008 (aged 91); Montecito, California, U.S.
- Occupation: Actress
- Years active: 1938–1993
- Spouses: Barton Bainbridge (m. 1938; died 1940) Charles Vidor (m. 1944; div. 1945) John Huston (m. 1946; div. 1950) Artie Shaw (m. 1957; div. 1985)

Evelyn Louise Keyes (November 20, 1916 – July 4, 2008) was an American film actress. She is best known for her role as Suellen O'Hara in the 1939 film Gone with the Wind.

== Early life ==
Evelyn Keyes was born in Port Arthur, Texas, to Omar Dow Keyes and Maude Ollive Keyes, the daughter of a Methodist minister. After Omar Keyes died when she was three years old, Keyes moved with her mother to Atlanta, Georgia, where they lived with her grandparents. According to her memoir, Keyes was sexually molested by one of her brother's friends when she was five years old. As a teenager, Keyes took dancing lessons and performed for local clubs such as the Daughters of the Confederacy.

== Film career ==
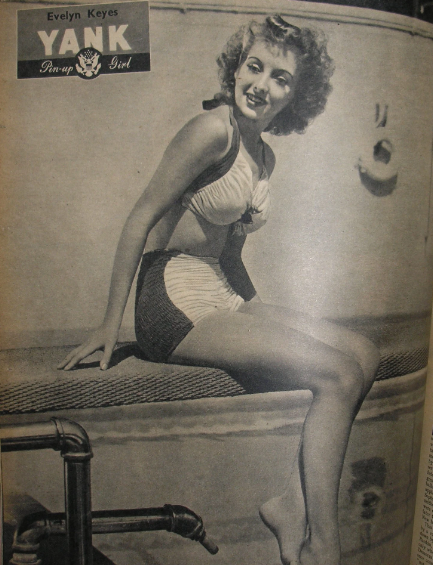
Pin-up photo of Keyes for Yank, the Army Weekly in 1944

A chorus girl by age 18, Keyes came out to Hollywood and was introduced to Cecil B. DeMille who in her own words "signed me to a personal contract without even making a test". After a handful of B movies at Paramount Pictures, she was cast in Say It in French (1938). However, Keyes had to drop out to have an abortion and was replaced by Olympe Bradna. Later, she auditioned for the role of Scarlett O'Hara in Gone with the Wind (1939). Though she failed to get the part, Selznick was impressed by her Southern accent and cast her as Scarlett O'Hara's sister Suellen in January 1939.

Columbia Pictures signed her to a contract. In 1941, she played an ingenue in Here Comes Mr. Jordan. She spent most of the early 1940s playing leads in many of Columbia's B dramas and mysteries. She appeared as the female lead opposite Larry Parks in Columbia's blockbuster hit The Jolson Story (1946). She followed this up with an enjoyable minor screwball comedy, The Mating of Millie, with Glenn Ford. She was then in a 1949 role as Kathy Flannigan in Mrs. Mike.

While under contract at Columbia, Keyes had long complained about the lack of challenging roles offered to her. When Sam Spiegel had bought the story for the film noir thriller The Prowler, John Huston (Spiegel's partner at Horizon Pictures) thought it would be the perfect project for Keyes, his then estranged wife, who went on to star in the 1951 movie alongside Van Heflin. Keyes felt it to be the best role and performance of her career. Keyes' last role in a major film was a small part as Tom Ewell's vacationing wife in The Seven Year Itch (1955). Keyes officially retired in 1956, but continued to act.

== Personal life ==
In her autobiography Scarlett O'Hara's Younger Sister: My Lively Life In and Out of Hollywood, Keyes described being sexually harassed by her director Andrew Stone while working on Say It in French. She soon found out she was pregnant (presumably by her boyfriend Barton Bainbridge), and had an abortion before filming of Say It in French resumed. She wasn't at her best on set, and Stone humiliated her for her poor work. She was fired from the picture, replaced by Olympe Branda.

Only weeks later, she was cast in Gone With the Wind. She married Barton Bainbridge shortly after. Bainbridge was an alcoholic, and threatened Keyes with a gun on at least one occasion. They separated and in 1940, he committed suicide with a shotgun in her car, leaving a note. Keyes wrote: "The note said it was because I had left him. I never left a man again. I made them leave me."

Later, she married and divorced director Charles Vidor (1943–1945), actor/director John Huston (23 July 1946 – February 1950), and bandleader Artie Shaw (1957–1985). Keyes said of her many love affairs: "I always took up with the man of the moment and there were many such moments." During her marriage to Huston, the couple adopted a twelve-year-old Mexican child, Pablo, whom Huston had discovered while filming on location in Mexico for The Treasure of the Sierra Madre. In her memoir, Keyes claimed that her adoptive son sexually molested her and that they lost contact after only a few years.

Keyes expressed her opinion that Mrs. Mike was her best film. Among her many love affairs in Hollywood she recounted in Scarlett O'Hara's Younger Sister, were those with film producer Michael Todd (who left Evelyn for Elizabeth Taylor), actors Glenn Ford, Sterling Hayden, Dick Powell, Anthony Quinn, David Niven and Kirk Douglas. She had to regularly fend off Columbia Pictures studio head Harry Cohn's advances during her career at the studio.

Keyes died of uterine cancer on July 4, 2008 at the Pepper Estates in Montecito, California, and was cremated. Half her ashes were sent to Lamar University in Beaumont, Texas and the rest were divided among relatives and buried in a family plot at Waco Baptist Church Cemetery, Waco, Georgia, with a small tombstone bearing the epitaph Gone with the Wind.

== Filmography ==
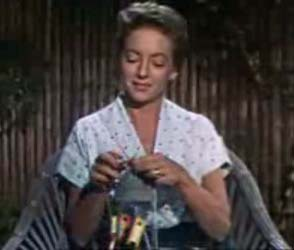
Evelyn Keyes in The Seven Year Itch (1955)

Excluding appearances as herself.

=== Film ===
Year	Title	Role	Notes
1938	The Buccaneer	Madeleine	
1938	Sons of the Legion	Linda Lee	
1939	Sudden Money	Mary Patterson	
1939	Union Pacific	Mrs. Calvin	
1939	Gone with the Wind	Suellen O'Hara	
1939	Slightly Honorable	Miss Vlissigen	
1940	The Lady in Question	Francois Morestan	
1940	Before I Hang	Martha Garth	
1940	Beyond the Sacramento	Lynn Perry	
1941	The Face Behind the Mask	Helen Williams	
1941	Here Comes Mr. Jordan	Bette Logan	
1941	Ladies in Retirement	Lucy	
1942	The Adventures of Martin Eden	Ruth Morley	
1942	Flight Lieutenant	Susie Thompson	
1943	The Desperadoes	Allison McLeod	
1943	Dangerous Blondes	Jane Craig	
1943	There's Something About a Soldier	Carol Harkness	
1944	Nine Girls	Mary O'Ryan	
1944	Strange Affair	Jacqueline 'Jack' Harrison	
1945	A Thousand and One Nights	Babs	
1946	Renegades	Hannah Brockway	
1946	The Thrill of Brazil	Vicki Dean	
1946	The Jolson Story	Julie Benson	
1947	Johnny O'Clock	Nancy Hobson	
1948	The Mating of Millie	Millie McGonigle	
1948	Enchantment	Grizel Dane	
1949	Mr. Soft Touch	Jenny Jones	
1949	Mrs. Mike	Kathy O'Fallon Flannigan	
1950	The Killer That Stalked New York	Sheila Bennet	
1951	Smuggler's Island	Vivian Craig	
1951	The Prowler	Susan Gilvray	
1951	Iron Man	Rose Warren Mason	
1952	One Big Affair	Jean Harper	
1952	It Happened in Paris	Patricia Moran	
1953	Rough Shoot	Cecily Paine	
1953	99 River Street	Linda James	
1954	Hell's Half Acre	Donna Williams	
1955	Top of the World	Virgie Rayne	
1955	The Seven Year Itch	Helen Sherman	
1956	Around the World in 80 Days	Cameo appearance	
1987	A Return to Salem's Lot	Mrs. Axel	
1989	Wicked Stepmother	Witch Instructor	

=== Television ===
Year	Title	Role	Notes
1951	Lux Video Theatre	Jane	Episode: "Wild Geese"
1955	Climax!	Drusilla Cayley	Episode: "Wild Stallion"
1968	Playhouse	Mrs. Panzack	Episode: "A Matter of Diamonds"
1968	The Ugliest Girl in Town	Mrs. Blair	Episode: "Visitors from a Strange Planet"
1971	From a Bird's Eye View	Mrs. Beal	Episode: "The Matchmakers"
1983	The Love Boat	Mrs. Parker	Episode: "Bricker's Boy/Lotions of Love/The Hustlers"
1985, 1987, 1993	Murder, She Wrote	Edna, Sister Emily, Wanda Polaski	Episodes: "Sticks & Stones", "Old Habits Die Hard", "Dead to Rights"
1986	Amazing Stories	Evelyn Chumsky	Episode: "Boo!"

== Bibliography ==
- Keyes, Evelyn (1971). I Am a Billboard. Lyle Stuart. ISBN 978-0818401077.
- Keyes, Evelyn (1977). Scarlett O'Hara's Younger Sister. Lyle Stuart. ISBN 978-0818402432.
- Keyes, Evelyn (1991). I'll Think about That Tomorrow. Dutton. ISBN 978-0525249696.
