= Wives Never Know =

1936 film by Elliott Nugent

- Theatrical poster
- Directed by: Elliott Nugent
- Written by: Frederick Hazlitt Brennan; Edwin Justus Mayer
- Story by: Keene Thompson
- Produced by: Harlan Thompson
- Starring: Charlie Ruggles; Mary Boland; Adolphe Menjou
- Cinematography: George T. Clemens
- Edited by: Richard C. Currier
- Music by: Boris Morros; Phil Boutelje; Harold Lewis; Ralph Rainger
- Production company: Paramount Pictures
- Distributed by: Paramount Pictures (1936 theatrical); MCA/Universal Pictures (1958 television)
- Release date: September 13, 1936 (United States theatrical)
- Running time: 75 minutes
- Country: United States
- Language: English

Wives Never Know is a 1936 American black-and-white comedy film directed by Elliott Nugent. Written by Frederick Hazlitt Brennan, Edwin Justus Mayer and Keene Thompson, the film stars Charlie Ruggles, Mary Boland, and Adolphe Menjou, and was produced by Adolph Zukor for Paramount Pictures.

== Plot ==
Homer and Marcia Bigelow are a happily married couple. Visiting novelist J. Hugh Ramsey considers himself both too wise to ever marry and, through hubris, qualified to offer his own wild theories on what constitutes a happy marriage. He had thus written a best selling novel titled Marriage, the Living Death. Ramsey decides that the Bigelow marriage could not possibly be as perfect as it appears, and convinces Homer that his wife must be secretly unhappy because she had never had the opportunity to forgive the morally spotless Homer for any misdeed. Wishing to please, Homer decides to involve himself in a trist so that Marcia would then have something for which she could forgive him. He chooses French actress Renée La Journée who is performing nearby. Ramsey learns of the affair and discovers that the La Journée turns out to be the one love of his life that he had lost years earlier.

== Cast ==
- Charlie Ruggles as Homer Bigelow
- Mary Boland as Marcia Bigelow
- Adolphe Menjou as J. Hugh Ramsey
- Vivienne Osborne as Renée La Journée
- Claude Gillingwater as Mr. Gossamer
- Fay Holden as Mrs. Gossamer
- Louise Beavers as Florabelle
- Constance Bergen as Miss Giddings
- Purnell Pratt as Higgins
- Suzanne Kaaren as Miss Flinton
- Irving Bacon as Dr. Mumford
- Edward LeSaint as Mr. Banker
- Henry Roquemore as Mr. Merchant
- Edward Earle as Mr. Lawyer
- Roger Gray as Farmer
- Arthur Housman as Snorter
- Tom Kennedy as Bartender
- Priscilla Lawson as Laboratory Assistant
- Jack Mulhall as Scout
- Frank O'Connor as Police Sergeant
- Lee Shumway as Police Sergeant
- Edward Gargan as Officer
- Lee Phelps as Doorman
- James Pierce as Dentist
- Ernest Shields as Drunk
- William Irving as Drunk
- Billy Bletcher as Drunk
- Lillian West as Gossip
- John M. Sullivan as Director
- Ben Taggart
- Ellen Drew

== Critical response ==
Lawrence Journal-World called the film "a delightful and hilarious comedy of married life". They wrote that Charles Ruggles and Mary Boland "carry the lead roles in inimitable manner which has endeared them to millions", and that the film marked a return to film for actress Vivienne Osborne after a two-year absence. Evening Independent noted that a film combination of Charles Ruggles and Mary Boland is always irresistible, and wrote that the film "kept the preview audience laughing from beginning to the last fade-out". In consideration of the three stars, they wrote "Ruggles, Boland and Menjou make a rollicking comedy trio", and predicted that the film "should play a merry tune at boxoffices". In October 1936, The Sunday Morning Star listed the film as one of its 'Best Bets of the Week'.

Conversely, Pittsburgh Post-Gazette advised that fans of Charles Ruggles and Mary Boland would be in for a "considerable let-down" when watching the film. In examining the film in comparison to previous films where Ruggles and Boland reprised roles where they were husband and wife, they wrote of Wives Never Know that "it is a listless, laborous little comedy that resembles the result of a scavenger hunt at the old Mack Sennett Studios." They offered that there were the expected laughs to be found in any film involving Ruggles and Boland, but that the storyline itself possessed few comic qualities, and that left to their own resources, the co-stars "falter and fumble through six or seven reels of makeshift humor."

The New York Times made note of the ongoing screen partnering of Charles Ruggles and Mary Boland, and that the film in offering Ruggles' "familiar timid-husband sequences" and Boland's "usual number of stock Bolandisms", seems to be holding "a sacrifice auction sale..." "...at a considerable reduction in humor." In addressing the film plot, they felt it was "merely an antiquated type of stage farce enacted before a camera". However, they made special note of the contribution of Adolphe Menjou, who in the role of a visiting author, was "quixotic as ever" in his character's "commendable effort to break up the Ruggles-Boland marriage." They commended that the entire cast gave their best efforts, and that "even the urbane Mr. Menjou falls into the ditch, as it were, unreservedly, without holding back a shred of himself."

== Release ==
Released theatrically in the United States September 13, 1936, the film was released as Jos rouvat tietäisivät in Finland May 23, 1937, and as Sikken en nat in Denmark August 9, 1937. In 1958 the rights were purchased by MCA/Universal Pictures.
