= Mike Fright =

1934 American short film by Gus Meins

- Directed by: Gus Meins
- Written by: Hal Roach
- Produced by: Hal Roach
- Cinematography: Kenneth Peach
- Edited by: Louis McManus
- Music by: Marvin Hatley; Leroy Shield
- Distributed by: Metro-Goldwyn-Mayer
- Release date: August 25, 1934
- Running time: 17' 11"
- Country: United States
- Language: English

Mike Fright is a 1934 Our Gang short comedy film directed by Gus Meins. It was the 130th Our Gang short to be released.

== Plot ==
When open auditions are announced for a radio variety program, the local station is besieged by aggressively over-coached "professional kids." Also auditioning is the International Silver String Submarine Band—which turns out to be the gang, equipped (or rather, armed) with home-made instruments.

They suffer through an endless parade of cute kiddie troupers, and accidentally knock over the microphone several times, which inadvertently blows tubes and bulbs in the control room, causing the hat worn by the sound man, played by vaudevillian Sid Walker, to be literally blown off his head, and making his hair stand on end. The gang then steal the show with a rendition of "The Daring Young Man on the Flying Trapeze."

Musical numbers include "Jimmy Had a Nickel" (by Maurice Sigler), "My Little Grass Shack in Kealakekua, Hawaii", and "My Wild Irish Rose" (by Chauncey Olcott), which is cut short because the gang is distractingly eating lemons!

== Cast ==
=== The Gang ===
- Matthew Beard as Stymie (on percussion)
- Scotty Beckett as Scotty (on fife)
- Tommy Bond as Tommy (conducting)
- George McFarland as Spanky (on kazoo)
- Alvin Buckelew as Alvin (on harmonica)
- Jackie Wilson as Jackie (on ukulele)
- Pete the Pup as himself

=== Additional cast ===
- Leonard Kibrick as Leonard
- Jean Aulbach as Hula dancer
- Billy Lee as Tap dancer
- Leona McDowell as Darling Sister
- Joy Wurgaft as Hula dancer
- Sid Walker as Charlie, the Sound Man
- Charlie Hall as Elevator Operator
- Marvin Hatley as Piano Player
- William Irving as Announcer
- Frank LaRue as Mr. Barker, the Sponsor
- Billie Van Every as "Miss Brown," the receptionist
- Isabel La Mal as Leonard's Mother
- James C. Morton as Mr. Morton, Station Manager
- Fern Carter as Audience member
- Joe Young as Audience member
- Laura June Kenny as Undetermined role
- Gloria White as Undetermined role
- The Meglin Kiddies as Dancers

== Theme song ==
Mike Fright was the first Our Gang short since Pups Is Pups to not contain the opening "Good Old Days" Our Gang theme song. Instead, it was replaced with the Leroy Shield incidental tune "Little Dancing Girl", which appeared as background music in many of the films and would be the music used for the first 4 minutes of this episode. Because the nature of this film was a talent show with a variety of musical selections, additional background music was not used, nor was it needed.

== See also ==
- Our Gang filmography
