= Song of Arizona =

1946 film by Frank McDonald

- Directed by: Frank McDonald
- Written by: Bradford Ropes (story); M. Coates Webster (writer)
- Produced by: Edward J. White (associate producer)
- Starring: See below
- Cinematography: Reggie Lanning
- Edited by: Arthur Roberts
- Music by: R. Dale Butts; Joseph Dubin; Mort Glickman
- Production company: Republic Pictures
- Distributed by: Republic Pictures
- Release date: March 9, 1946 (United States)
- Running time: 68 minutes 54 minutes
- Country: United States
- Language: English

Song of Arizona is a 1946 American Western film directed by Frank McDonald and starring Roy Rogers, Dale Evans and George "Gabby" Hayes. It was produced and distributed by Republic Pictures.

== Plot ==
Gabby Whittaker ("Gabby" Hayes) is in trouble with the bank, run by Dolly Finnuccin (Sarah Edwards). He hasn't made a payment in seven months and owes $25,000 (equivalent to $357,794 in 2021 dollars) on a loan that's due in one week, which he took to start Half-A-Chance Ranch for homeless boys in Lodestone, Arizona. It's graduation week for boys at the ranch, and alumni Roy Rogers has stopped by with graduation presents. (Song: "When a Fellow Needs a Friend", medley with "Half a Chance Ranch").

One of the boys at the ranch is Chip Blaine, son of bank robber King Blaine (Lyle Talbot), who has been sending packages to Chip. King stops by to see Chip but takes off when the sheriff shows up. Pursuing King, the sheriff mortally wounds him. King tells Gabby he owns a Kansas City garage and wants to give it to Gabby, so he can sell it and pay off the loan. He asks Roy to visit his stepdaughter Clare Summers (Evans) while he's there and give her a letter from him.

Roy finds out the garage was completely destroyed in a fire and uninsured. He also locates Clare Summers at the club she sings at ("Round and Around - The Lariat Song") and after sharing a duet with Clare ("Did You Ever Get That Feeling in the Moonlight") gives her King's letter, which mentions that King has put away money for her and Chip to split.

After King dies, two of his gang stop by and get Chip to meet them later. While the Pioneers sing a song ("Michael O'Leary O'Brien O'Toole"), Chip sneaks out and meets them. They claim that half the money King has been sending Chip belongs to them. When a horse is discovered missing, Gabby and Roy and his men ride to the ranch and shoot it out with the gang. Two of the gang make a break for it, using Chip as a decoy.

Back at the Half-A-Chance, Clare stops by and meets Chip. When she questions him, Chip says he doesn't know about any money. Later, he looks into the packages King had been sending him and finds the money she asked about. Chip gathers up the $25,000 and secretly drops it off at Dolly Finnuccin's house, using a note that Gabby had written. The next day, the boys are preparing the barn for a party. Roy takes Chip aside and gets him to admit he paid the money. Knowing that Gabby wouldn't want to accept that 'dirty' money, Roy tells him he will think hard about how to handle it.

While the party is going on the next night ("Mr. Spook Steps Out"), Dolly Finnuccin stops by with the sheriff to arrest Gabby, thinking that he paid the money, which King Blaine had stolen right from her bank. Chip confesses that he dropped off the money and Gabby is innocent. After retrieving the rest of the money from the barn to turn it in, King's old gang shows up and steals the money back and takes off. Roy and his men pursue the gang and capture them. With the reward, Dolly forgives the loan on the Half-A-Chance and gives it a makeover. Asked by Gabby to lead off a song to celebrate, Roy complies, as Clare and the boys join in ("Song of Arizona").

== Cast ==
- Roy Rogers as Roy Rogers
- Trigger as himself - Roy's Horse
- George "Gabby" Hayes as Gabby Whittaker
- Dale Evans as Clare Summers
- Lyle Talbot as King Blaine
- Tommy Cook as Chip Blaine
- Johnny Calkins as Clarence
- Sarah Edwards as Dolly Finnuccin
- Tommy Ivo as Jimmy
- Michael Chapin as Cyclops
- Dick Curtis as Henchman Bart
- Edmund Cobb as Sheriff Jim Clark
- Tom Quinn as Henchman Tom
- Noble 'Kid' Chissel as Henchman Jim
- The Robert Mitchell Boy Choir as Boys at ranch
- Bob Nolan as Ranch hand
- Sons of the Pioneers as Ranch hands / Musicians

== Soundtrack ==
- Roy Rogers with Bob Nolan and the Sons of the Pioneers - "Song of Arizona" (Written by John Elliott as Jack Elliott)
- Roy Rogers with the Robert Mitchell Boys Choir - "When a Fellow Needs a Friend"
- "Michael O'Leary O'Brien O'Toole" (Written by Gordon Forster)
- "Did You Ever Get That Feeling in the Moonlight" (Written by Ira Schuster, Larry Stock and James Cavanaugh)
- "Round and Around - The Lariat Song" (Written by John Elliott as Jack Elliott)
- "Way Out There" (Words and Music by Bob Nolan)
- "Will You Be My Darling" (Written by Mary Ann Owens)
- "Half a Chance Ranch" (Written by John Elliott as Jack Elliott)
- "Mr. Spook Steps Out" (Written by John Elliott as Jack Elliott)

== Release ==
Song of Arizona was released to US theaters in April 1946 and well-received, playing throughout the remainder of 1946.

Reviews include such comments as, "...a fine western. Not top notch story telling or acting but enjoyable", "simple title conceals Republic's three-in-one plot:, a Roy Rogers musical, a sentimentally handled ranch for homeless boys, and an old bang-bang Western", "at least it tries to be fresher than the typical B-Western by trying a few wrinkles in the familiar plot line".
