= Silk Hat Kid =

1935 film by H. Bruce Humberstone

- Directed by: H. Bruce Humberstone
- Screenplay by: Edward Eliscu; Lou Breslow; Dore Schary
- Starring: Lew Ayres; Mae Clarke; Paul Kelly; Ralf Harolde; William Harrigan; Billy Lee
- Cinematography: Daniel B. Clark
- Music by: Samuel Kaylin
- Production company: Fox Film Corporation
- Distributed by: 20th Century-Fox Film Corporation
- Release date: July 19, 1935
- Running time: 68 minutes
- Country: United States
- Language: English

Silk Hat Kid is a 1935 American crime film directed by H. Bruce Humberstone and written by Edward Eliscu, Lou Breslow and Dore Schary. The film, starring Lew Ayres, Mae Clarke, Paul Kelly, Ralf Harolde, William Harrigan and Billy Lee, was released on July 19, 1935, by 20th Century-Fox Film Corporation.

== Plot ==
Eddie Howard, a fast-thinking, two-fisted bodyguard, is hired by nightclub-owner Tim Martin to protect him from chiseling gangsters operating an extortion racket. But Eddie meets and falls in love with Laura Grant, Tim's sweetheart, and complications quickly arise.

== Cast ==
- Lew Ayres as Eddie Howard
- Mae Clarke as Laura Grant
- Paul Kelly as Tim Martin
- Ralf Harolde as Lefty Phillips
- William Harrigan as Brother Joe Campbell
- Billy Lee as Tommy
- John Qualen as Mr. Fossbender
- Warren Hymer as Misty
- Vince Barnett as Mr. Rabinowitz
