= The Biscuit Eater (1940 film) =

1940 film by Stuart Heisler

- Directed by: Stuart Heisler
- Written by: Stuart Anthony; Lillie Hayward
- Based on: the short story "The Biscuit Eater" by James H. Street
- Produced by: Jack Moss
- Starring: Billy Lee; Cordell Hickman; Richard Lane
- Cinematography: Leo Tover
- Edited by: Everett Douglas
- Music by: Friedrich Hollaender
- Production company: Paramount Pictures
- Distributed by: Paramount Pictures
- Release date: May 22, 1940 (New York City)
- Running time: 81-82 minutes
- Country: United States
- Language: English

The Biscuit Eater is a 1940 children's film directed by Stuart Heisler and starring Billy Lee and Cordell Hickman as two kids who raise a runt of a dog. It was named one of the Top Ten Films of 1940 by the National Board of Review. Walt Disney Productions made a 1972 remake under the same title.

== Plot ==
Harvey McNeil breeds and trains quail bird dogs for his new boss Mr. Ames, who has recently inherited the breeding. Harvey's young son Lonnie wants a dog of his own. Dixie has a litter of pups and Lonnie wants to raise the runt. Dad explains you have to keep the blood lines strong and the runts need to be killed. Also any dog that likes to eat chicken eggs is known as a biscuit eater and a poor bird dog because of its attraction to the wrong kind of bird.

Lonnie eventually gets a dog named Promise who he raises with his best friend Text. Unfortunately Promise likes chicken eggs and Dad orders the dog removed from the farm. The boys rescue the dog from the man who lives in a swamp. The boys have many misadventures with rattlesnakes, skunks and shotguns as they secretly train the dog.

To prove that his dog is a worthy bird dog, Lonnie enters 'Prom' into the field trials in direct competition with his father's champion. Dad orders his son to withdraw but Mr. Ames sees it as a good learning experience for the boy. Lonnie and Text compete all day and end up in the finals against the father's dog. Text is told if the father loses, Mr. McNeil may lose his trainer's job. Lonnie purposely calls his dog off point and loses.

Later that night Promise returns home and as he tries to jump into the dog pen he is shot by the farm hand. As Lonnie holds his dying dog, he apologizes for not letting him win and calling him a 'biscuit eater'. The father overhears his son explain how he was protecting his dad's job. Promise is the sire of the next line of pups.

== Cast ==
- Billy Lee as Lonnie McNeil
- Cordell Hickman as Text Lee
- Richard Lane as Harvey McNeil
- Lester Matthews as Mr. Ames
- Helene Millard as Mrs. McNeil
- Fred Toones as Sermon (as Snowflake)
- Tiverton Invader as Promise, aka The Biscuit Eater

== Production ==
=== Casting ===
Baby LeRoy was originally cast as Lonnie McNeil. While filming the first scene on location, which called for LeRoy to swing across a lake on a rope, he fell into the water twice.

By the following day, he had lost his voice from a cold. As the entire crew was on location, the accident forced the director to choose between recasting or holding up production until he recovered. The director chose to recast, and Billy Lee replaced LeRoy in the role.
