= Sudden Money =

1939 film by Nick Grinde

- Directed by: Nick Grinde
- Written by: Lewis R. Foster
- Produced by: William C. Thomas
- Starring: Charlie Ruggles; Marjorie Rambeau; Charley Grapewin; Broderick Crawford; Billy Lee; Evelyn Keyes
- Cinematography: Henry Sharp
- Edited by: Ellsworth Hoagland
- Music by: Sam Coslow; John Leipold; Leo Shuken
- Production company: Paramount Pictures
- Distributed by: Paramount Pictures
- Release date: March 31, 1939
- Running time: 66 minutes
- Country: United States
- Language: English

Sudden Money is a 1939 American comedy film directed by Nick Grinde, written by Lewis R. Foster and starring Charlie Ruggles, Marjorie Rambeau, Charley Grapewin, Broderick Crawford, Billy Lee and Evelyn Keyes. It was released on March 31, 1939, by Paramount Pictures.

== Plot ==
When the Patterson family wins $150,000 in a sweepstakes, family patriarch and frustrated drummer Sweeney decides to reassemble his old college ragtime band. Sweeney's wife Elsie enrolls in an art school, eager to become a painter. Her brother Doc begins gambling on horse races. The Pattersons' daughter Mary attends an expensive boarding school while son Junior is enrolled in a military academy. Grandpa Casey disapproves, believing that the family should be more careful with the windfall.

A young woman named Yolo joins Sweeney's band and immediately creates problems. Her jealous ex-convict boyfriend punches Sweeney in the nose. Elsie's art teacher disappears with her tuition fee. Mary's new beau Johnny Jordan and his father are appalled by the family's behavior, and she is expelled from school. The family slowly returns to poverty.

Grandpa Casey, proven right about how the family handled its fortune, wins a small cash prize himself, and the family once again devises grand plans.

== Cast ==
- Charlie Ruggles as Sweeney J. Patterson
- Marjorie Rambeau as Elsie Patterson
- Charley Grapewin as Grandpa Casey Patterson
- Broderick Crawford as Archibald "Doc" Finney
- Billy Lee as Junior Patterson
- Evelyn Keyes as Mary Patterson
- Phil Warren as Eddie Dunn
- Joyce Mathews as Yolo
- Richard Denning as Johnny Jordan
- Mary Parker as Ellen
- Richard Tucker as Mr. Rodney Hinds
- James Burke as McPherson
- Charles Halton as Mr. Wixby
- Ethel Wales as Miss Perkins
- Alex Melesh as Prof. Armand Tito
- John Gallaudet as Phil Stokes
- John Kelly as Butch
- Homer Dickenson as Herbie
- Joe Yule as Joe
- Billy Engle as Peewee
- Douglas Wood as Mr. Jordan
- Eddie Marr as Diamond
- Donald Kerr as Ted
- William B. Davidson as Sam
- Emory Parnell as Cop

== Reception ==
In a contemporary review, the Los Angeles Times called Sudden Money "an unusually good 'program' picture" and wrote: "When the money leads to disaster, and the entire family discovers it is better off right back where they started, the audience also finds it has been well entertained with a movie that rates top billing on any double bill."
