= Nobody's Children (1940 film) =

1940 film

- Directed by: Charles Barton
- Written by: Doris Malloy
- Based on: Nobody's Children; 1939--1941 radio series by Walter White Jr.
- Produced by: Irving Briskin; Jack Fier
- Starring: Edith Fellows; Billy Lee; Georgia Caine; Lois Wilson
- Cinematography: Benjamin H. Kline
- Edited by: Richard Fantl
- Music by: George Parrish
- Production company: Columbia Pictures
- Distributed by: Columbia Pictures
- Release date: December 12, 1940
- Running time: 64 minutes
- Country: United States
- Language: English

Nobody's Children is a 1940 American drama film directed by Charles Barton and starring Edith Fellows, Billy Lee, Georgia Caine and Lois Wilson. It was produced and distributed by Columbia Pictures.

== Cast ==
- Edith Fellows as Pat
- Billy Lee as Tommy
- Georgia Caine as Mrs. Marshall
- Lois Wilson as Miss Jamieson
- Walter White Jr. as Walter White Jr.
- Ben Taggart as Mr. Millar
- Mary Currier as Mrs. Millar
- Mary Gordon as Mary
- Lillian West as Miss Spellman
- William Gould as Dr. Tovar
- Dorothy Adams as Mrs. Alice Stone
- Russell Hicks as Sen. Lawrence Hargrave
- Georgia Backus as Mrs. Wynn
- Ivan Miller as Mr. John Stone
- Lloyd Whitlock as Mr. Gibney
- Edythe Elliott as Mrs. King
- John Marston as Mr. Ferber
- Mira McKinney as Mrs. Ferber
- Edward Earle as Mr. Rogers
- Joel Friedkin as Tim, the Grocery Man
- Lee Millar as Dr. Gireaux
- Freddie Chapman as Hal
- Janet Chapman as Peggy
- Joel Davis as Vincent
- Nell Craig as Hospital Receptionist
- Evelyn Young as Nurse

== Bibliography ==
- Dick, Bernard F. Columbia Pictures: Portrait of a Studio. University Press of Kentucky, 2015.
- Etling, Laurence. Radio in the Movies: A History and Filmography, 1926–2010. McFarland, 2011.
- Fetrow, Alan G. Feature Films, 1940-1949: a United States Filmography. McFarland, 1994.
