= And Sudden Death =

1936 American film by Charles Barton

- Theatrical release poster
- Directed by: Charles Barton
- Screenplay by: Joseph Moncure March
- Story by: Theodore Reeves; Madeleine Ruthven
- Produced by: A.M. Botsford; William T. Lackey
- Starring: Randolph Scott; Frances Drake; Tom Brown; Billy Lee; Fuzzy Knight; Terry Walker; Porter Hall
- Cinematography: Alfred Gilks
- Edited by: Hugh Bennett
- Music by: John Leipold
- Production company: Paramount Pictures
- Distributed by: Paramount Pictures
- Release date: June 16, 1936
- Running time: 67 minutes
- Country: United States
- Language: English

And Sudden Death is a 1936 American drama film directed by Charles Barton and written by Joseph Moncure March. The film stars Randolph Scott, Frances Drake, and Tom Brown; with supporting actors Billy Lee, Fuzzy Knight, Terry Walker and Porter Hall. The film was released on June 16, 1936, by Paramount Pictures.

== Plot ==
Betty Winslow and others in her family are reckless drivers, and Lt. Knox of the police is determined to make her change her ways after repeated traffic violations. Betty eventually reforms, but when drunken brother Jackie gets behind the wheel of a car and causes an accident, Betty takes the blame and goes to prison.

Jackie's guilty conscience ultimately gets the better of him, freeing Betty to get on with her life, as well as a romantic future with Lt. Knox.

== Cast ==
- Randolph Scott as Police Lt. James Knox
- Frances Drake as Betty Winslow
- Tom Brown as Jackie Winslow
- Billy Lee as Bobby Sanborn
- Fuzzy Knight as Steve Bartlett
- Terry Walker as Bangs
- Porter Hall as District Attorney
- Charles Quigley as Mike Andrews
- Joe Sawyer as Police Sgt. Sanborn
- Oscar Apfel as Defense Counsel
- Maidel Turner as Dodie Sloan
- Charles Arnt as Archie Sloan
- Jimmy Conlin as Mr. Tweets
- John Hyams as J.R. Winslow
- Herbert Evans as Meggs
- Don Rowan as Police Sgt. Malone
- Wilma Francis as Nurse
- William Ingersoll as Judge
