= The Night of June 13 =

1932 film

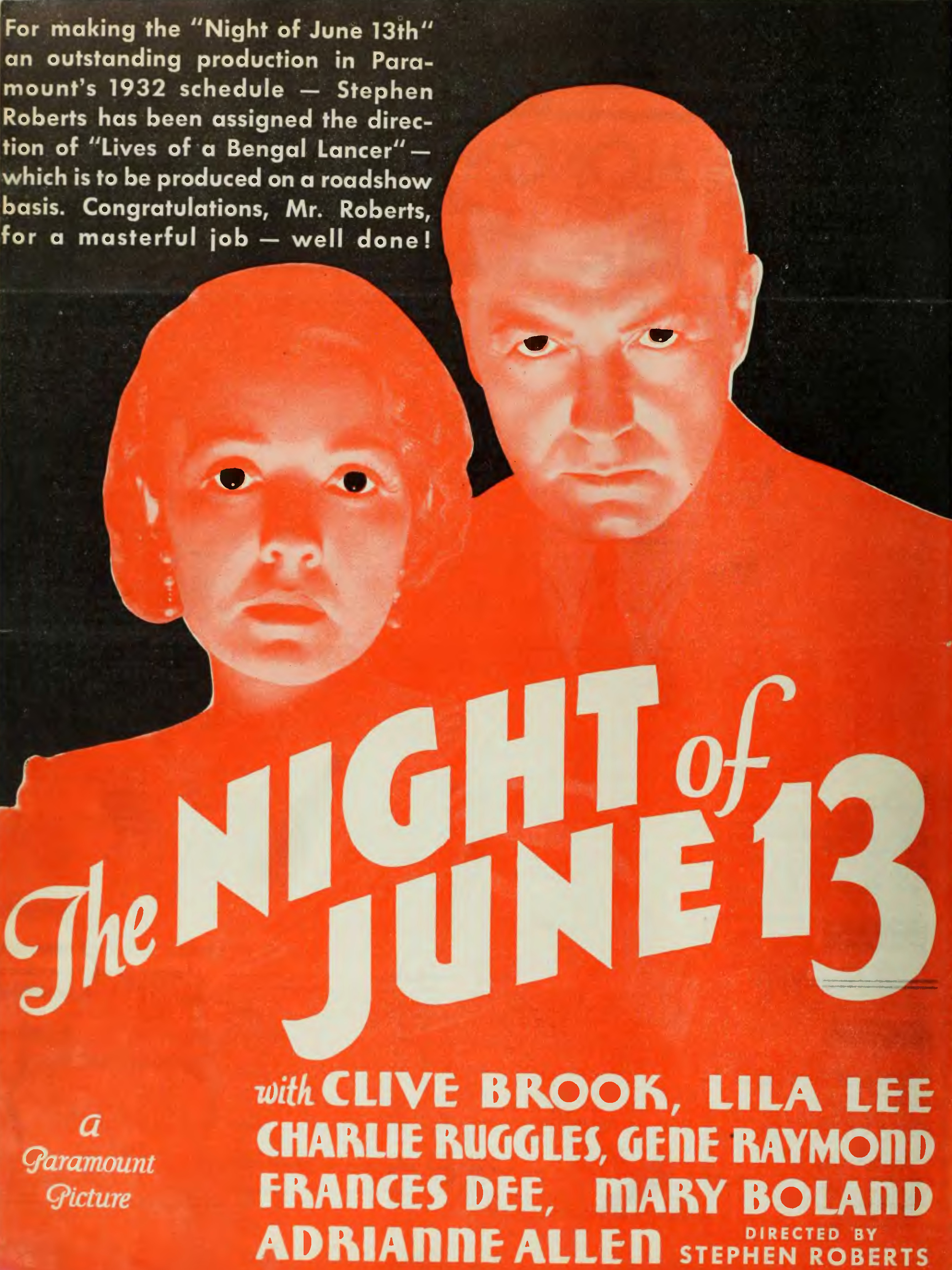
- Theatrical release poster
- Directed by: Stephen Roberts
- Screenplay by: Vera Caspary; Agnes Brand Leahy; Brian Marlow
- Starring: Clive Brook; Frances Dee; Charlie Ruggles; Gene Raymond; Lila Lee; Mary Boland; Adrianne Allen
- Cinematography: Harry Fischbeck
- Music by: John Leipold
- Production company: Paramount Pictures
- Distributed by: Paramount Pictures
- Release date: September 23, 1932
- Running time: 76 minutes
- Country: United States
- Language: English

The Night of June 13 is a 1932 American pre-Code mystery film directed by Stephen Roberts. The film stars Clive Brook, Frances Dee, Charlie Ruggles, Gene Raymond, Lila Lee, Mary Boland and Adrianne Allen. The film was released on September 23, 1932, by Paramount Pictures.

== Cast ==
- Clive Brook as John Curry
- Lila Lee as Trudie Morrow
- Charlie Ruggles as Philo Strawn
- Frances Dee as Ginger Blake
- Gene Raymond as Herbert Morrow
- Mary Boland as Mazie Strawn
- Adrianne Allen as Elna Curry
- Charley Grapewin as "Grandpop" Jeptha Strawn
- Helen Ware as Mrs. Lizzie Morrow
- Helen Jerome Eddy as Martha Blake
- Arthur Hohl as Prosecuting Attorney
- Billy Butts as Junior Strawn
- Richard Carle as Otto

Other uncredited cast members (alphabetically)

- Bobby Barber as Jury Foreman
- Frederick Burton as Judge
- Wallis Clark as Defense Attorney
- John Elliott as Real Estate Agent
- Paul Fix as Reporter
- Billy Franey as Jimmy - Trash Collector
- Otto Fries as Bailiff
- Edward LeSaint as Mr. Henry Morrow
- Kent Taylor as Reporter
