= People Will Talk (1935 film) =

1935 film by Alfred Santell

- Directed by: Alfred Santell
- Screenplay by: Herbert Fields
- Based on: Kayo! Oke! 1930 story in The Saturday Evening Post by Sophie Kerr Such a Lovely Couple by F. Hugh Herbert
- Produced by: Douglas MacLean
- Starring: Charlie Ruggles; Mary Boland; Leila Hyams; Dean Jagger
- Cinematography: Alfred Gilks
- Edited by: Richard C. Currier
- Music by: Tom Satterfield
- Production company: Paramount Pictures
- Distributed by: Paramount Pictures
- Release date: May 24, 1935
- Running time: 67 minutes
- Country: United States
- Language: English

People Will Talk is a 1935 American comedy film directed by Alfred Santell and written by Herbert Fields. The film stars Charlie Ruggles, Mary Boland, Leila Hyams, Dean Jagger, Ruthelma Stevens, and Cecil Cunningham. The film was released on May 24, 1935, by Paramount Pictures.

== Plot ==
After twenty years of marriage, Henry and Clarice Wilton agree to pretend to fake a fight to prove to their squabbling daughter and son-in-law how arguments are settled. However the pretense ends up turning into a real running dispute between them.

== Cast ==
- Charlie Ruggles as Henry Wilton
- Mary Boland as Clarice Wilton
- Leila Hyams as Peggy Trask
- Dean Jagger as Bill Trask
- Ruthelma Stevens as Doris McBride
- Cecil Cunningham as Nellie Simpson
- Stanley Andrews as Willis McBride
- Constantine Romanoff as Prettyboy Plotsky
- Hans Steinke as Strangler Martin
- Edward Brophy as Pete Ranse
- Sarah Edwards as Martie Beemish
- John Rogers as Spider Murphy
