= The Prowler (1951 film) =

1951 American film noir thriller film by Joseph Losey

- Theatrical release poster
- Directed by: Joseph Losey
- Screenplay by: Dalton Trumbo (Note: Fronted by Hugo Butler.)
- Story by: Robert Thoeren; Hans Wilhelm
- Produced by: Sam Spiegel
- Starring: Van Heflin; Evelyn Keyes
- Cinematography: Arthur C. Miller
- Edited by: Paul Weatherwax
- Music by: Lyn Murray
- Production company: Horizon Pictures
- Distributed by: United Artists
- Release date: May 25, 1951 (U.S.)
- Running time: 92 minutes
- Country: United States
- Language: English

The Prowler is a 1951 American thriller film noir directed by Joseph Losey from a screenplay by Dalton Trumbo, starring Van Heflin and Evelyn Keyes. The film is about a police officer (Heflin) who plots to kill the husband of a married woman he's having an affair with (Keyes), without her knowledge.

The film was co-produced by Sam Spiegel and an uncredited John Huston. As Dalton Trumbo had been blacklisted, the screenplay was credited on original release to his friend, screenwriter Hugo Butler, as a front.

== Plot ==
Webb Garwood, a single and disgruntled cop, is called to investigate a report of a peeping tom by Susan Gilvray, whose husband works nights as a radio personality. Webb falls in love and becomes obsessed with Susan, and they begin an adulterous affair.

After Webb discovers that Susan's husband has a life insurance policy, he concocts a murderous scheme. One night, he makes noise outside Susan's house to suggest that a prowler is nearby. He returns to the house in his official capacity as a police officer and again makes noise indicating a prowler. When Susan's husband comes outside armed, Webb, hiding in the bushes, kills him with his service revolver. Webb wounds himself with the dead man's pistol to create the appearance that they had exchanged gunfire.

Webb's ruse fools a coroner's jury, partly because he and Susan testify that they did not know each other before her husband's death, although Webb's police partner knows otherwise.

At first, Susan suspects Webb of foul play, but he convinces her of his innocence and later marries her. Shortly after the wedding, Susan informs Webb that she is four months pregnant. Since her husband was infertile, she knows that Webb is the baby's father. The date of the baby's conception would prove that they lied in their testimonies to hide their previous relationship and suggest that Webb's killing of Susan's husband was intentional.

Webb and Susan flee to Calico, a ghost town, for the baby to be born without the knowledge of anyone back home. They enjoy a happy life until Susan enters premature labor. Webb drives to a nearby town and forces Dr. William James to come to Calico to help with the birth. Susan realizes that Webb intends to kill Dr. James to preserve their secret, so she warns the doctor, who escapes with the newborn and Webb's Cadillac keys.

Susan tells Webb that she knows that he intended to kill the doctor and that he intentionally murdered her husband. Realizing that the doctor will send the police after him, Webb drives away, leaving Susan alone in Calico.

Webb finds the narrow track out of town blocked by his former police partner. While desperately trying to push his friend's reversing car with his own car's front bumper, Webb sees two police cars approaching, so he flees on foot. After he refuses orders to surrender, a sheriff's deputy shoots him from afar.

== Cast ==
- Van Heflin as Webb Garwood
- Evelyn Keyes as Susan Gilvray
- John Maxwell as Bud Crocker
- Katherine Warren as Grace Crocker
- Emerson Treacy as William Gilvray
- Madge Blake as Martha Gilvray
- Wheaton Chambers as Dr. William James
- Robert Osterloh as Coroner
- Louise Lorimer as Motel Manager
- Sherry Hall as John Gilvray

Uncredited

- Dalton Trumbo as the radio voice of John Gilvray
- Louise Emerald Bates as Everlyn
- Herbert Anderson as Reporter
- George Nader as Photographer

== Production ==
Evelyn Keyes, under contract at Columbia, had long complained about the lack of challenging roles offered to her. When Sam Spiegel of Horizon Pictures (producers of the film for United Artists) bought the story, his partner at Horizon, John Huston, believed that it would be the perfect project for Keyes, his estranged wife. Although more famous for her role in Gone with the Wind, Keyes felt this to be the best role and performance of her career. Of those working on the film, only Spiegel, Huston and Losey knew that the screenwriter was Dalton Trumbo.

Several crew members who worked on The Prowler were adversely affected by the Hollywood blacklist. Screenplay writer Dalton Trumbo, an admitted communist and member of the Hollywood 10, wrote under the pseudonym of his friend Hugo Butler. Butler was also blacklisted, writing in exile for 12 years and also using pseudonyms to deceive the public. Director Joseph Losey cast Trumbo as the voice of the radio disc jockey John Gilvray. Losey also faced blacklisting shortly after directing the film, and would spend much of the rest of his career in Europe.

=== Restoration ===
As The Prowler was produced independently, there was no studio to help preserve it and it was considered orphaned. After a time, there was only one deteriorating print left, but the Film Noir Foundation and the UCLA Film and Television Archive partnered to restore the film.

=== Home media ===
The Prowler was released on February 1, 2011 on DVD via VCI Entertainment. The film became available on Blu-ray on March 10, 2015 by the same company. It has been shown on the Turner Classic Movies show Noir Alley with Eddie Muller.

== Reception ==
In a contemporary review, The New York Times noted "an impressive drama."

The Brooklyn Eagle was highly complimentary in 1951: "'The Prowler' is intelligent, persuasive, and highly entertaining....Joseph Losey's unhurried but high-powered direction of the story maintains a continuous high level of interest....A great share of the credit for the unselfconscious honesty of the film goes to...Heflin and...Keyes in the leading roles."

Film critic Dennis Schwartz liked the film, writing in 2000: "A neat noir thriller that has a slight variation on the Double Indemnity theme, this time it is the guy who is the seducer. This is a Joseph Losey American film, made before his self-exile from the 1950s HUAC witch hunt days when he fled to England. It is the director's aim to highlight social issues and class differences. They will play a major role in the motif, adding to the usual noir ones of dark character and sexual misconduct. Dalton Trumbo, the blacklisted writer, is the uncredited co-writer of the script."

Leonard Maltin awarded the film 3 out of a possible 4 stars, praising its camerawork and production design and calling the film "unusually nasty and utterly unpredictable".

Eddie Muller listed it as one of his Top 25 Noir Films: "Silent producer John Huston's goodbye gift to wife Evelyn Keyes: a terrific role in a truly weird film. Dated by the pregnancy angle, but relentlessly compelling."

The Prowler holds a rare 100% rating on Rotten Tomatoes based on 18 reviews.

== Sources ==
- Callahan, Dan. 2003. Losey, Joseph. Senses of Cinema, March 2003. Great Directors Issue 25.https://www.sensesofcinema.com/2003/greatdirectors/losey/#:~:text=The%20dominant%20themes%20of%20Losey's,love%20story%20in%20his%20films. Accessed 12 October 2024.
- Hirsch, Foster. 1980. Joseph Losey. Twayne Publishers, Boston, Massachusetts. ISBN 0-8057-9257-0
- Leahy, James. 2002. Losey Revisited. Senses of Cinema, July 2002. Director: Joseph Losey Issue 21https://www.sensesofcinema.com/2002/director-joseph-losey/losey_revisited/ Accessed 10 October 2024.
- Palmer, James and Riley, Michael. 1993. The Films of Joseph Losey. Cambridge University Press, Cambridge, England. ISBN 0-521-38386-2
- Walsh, David. 2009. Questions and answers on the Hollywood blacklists—Part 2: An interview with film historian Reynold Humphries. World Socialist Web Site, March 12, 2009.https://www.wsws.org/en/articles/2009/03/hum2-m12.html Accessed 10 October 2024.
