= Night Work (1939 film) =

1939 film by George Archainbaud

- Directed by: George Archainbaud
- Screenplay by: Monte Brice; Lloyd Corrigan; Lewis R. Foster
- Produced by: William H. Wright
- Cinematography: Harry Hallenberger
- Edited by: Stuart Gilmore
- Production company: Paramount Pictures
- Release date: August 4, 1939 (USA)
- Running time: 60 Minutes
- Country: United States
- Language: English

Night Work is a 1939 American comedy film directed by George Archainbaud and starring Mary Boland, Charles Ruggles, Billy Lee, and Donald O'Connor. The film is the sequel to Boy Trouble.

== Cast ==
- Mary Boland as Sybil Fitch
- Charles Ruggles as Homer C. Fitch
- Billy Lee as Joe Fitch
- Donald O'Connor as Butch Smiley
- Clem Bevans as Smokestack Smiley
- William Frawley as Bruiser Brown
- Joyce Mathews as Patricia Fitch
- John Hartley as Windy Wilson
- William Haade as Mr. Turk
- Edward Gargan as Officer Flannigan
