= Sons of the Legion =

1938 film by James P. Hogan

- Directed by: James P. Hogan
- Written by: Lewis R. Foster; Lillie Hayward; Robert F. McGowan
- Produced by: Stuart Walker
- Starring: Lynne Overman; Evelyn Keyes; Tim Holt
- Cinematography: Charles Edgar Schoenbaum
- Edited by: Anne Bauchens
- Music by: Boris Morros
- Production company: Paramount Pictures
- Distributed by: Paramount Pictures
- Release date: September 18, 1938
- Running time: 60 minutes
- Country: United States
- Language: English

Sons of the Legion is a 1938 American drama film directed by James P. Hogan and starring Lynne Overman, Evelyn Keyes and Tim Holt.

== Plot ==
A group of boys looking to start a S.A.L. squadron have difficulties because a boy's father wrongfully received a dishonorable discharge after the Great War, his father cannot join the American Legion and in turn the son cannot join the squadron.

== Cast ==
- Lynne Overman as Charles Lee
- Evelyn Keyes as Linda Lee
- Tim Holt as Steven Scott
- Elizabeth Patterson as Grandmother Lee
- William Frawley as Uncle Willie Lee
- Billy Cook as David Lee
- Billy Lee as Billy Lee
- Donald O'Connor as Butch Baker
- Edward Pawley as Gunman Baker
- Richard Tucker as State Commander
- Johnnie Morris as Mickey
- Wally Albright as Harold
- Benny Bartlett as Red O'Flaherty
- Lucille Ward as Margaret
- Ronald Paige as Boy
- David Holt as Jimmy Hynes
- Georgie Billings as Skinny
- Sammy McKim as Spec
- Arthur Singer as Abie
- Walter Tetley as Shifty
- Charles Peck as Clarence
- Sonny Boy Williams as Dickie
- James T. Mack as Postman
- Carl Harbaugh as Customer
- Emmett Vogan as Policeman
- Sarah Edwards as Mrs. Hynes

== Production ==
Tim Holt was loaned to Paramount from Walter Wanger. Filming started June 30, 1938.
