= Mary Boland =

American actress (1882–1965)

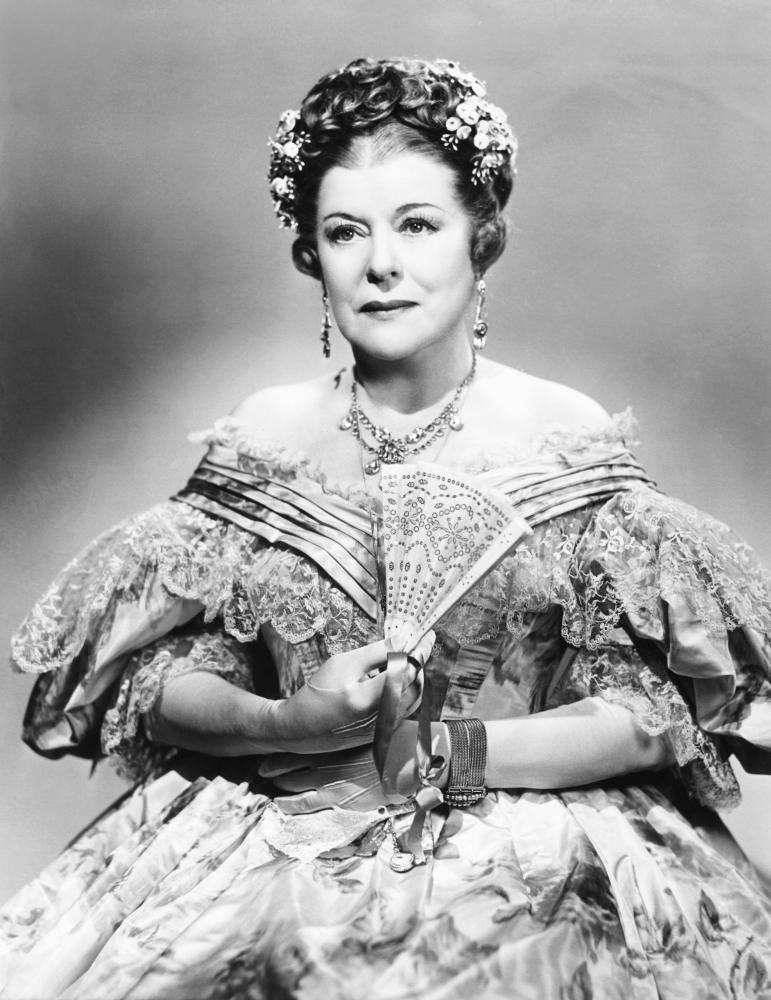
- Boland in 1940
- Born: Marie Anne Boland; January 28, 1882; Philadelphia, Pennsylvania, U.S.
- Died: June 23, 1965 (aged 83); New York City, U.S.
- Resting place: Forest Lawn Memorial Park Cemetery, Glendale, California, U.S.
- Occupation: Actress
- Years active: 1901–1955

Mary Boland (born Marie Anne Boland; January 28, 1882 – June 23, 1965) was an American stage and film actress.

== Early years ==
Born in Philadelphia, Pennsylvania, Boland was the daughter of repertory actor William Augustus Boland, and his wife Mary Cecilia Hatton. She had an older sister named Sara. The family later moved to Detroit.

Boland went to school at the Convent of the Sacred Heart in Detroit. By age fifteen she had left school and was performing on stage.

In 1901, she began acting on stage with a local stock theater company.

== Career ==
She debuted on Broadway in 1907 in the play The Ranger with Dustin Farnum and had appeared in eleven Broadway productions, notably with John Drew, becoming his "leading lady in New York and on the road." She made her silent film debut for Triangle Studios in 1915. She entertained soldiers in France during World War I and then returned to America. After appearing in nine movies, she left filmmaking in 1920, returning to the stage and appearing in several Broadway productions, including The Torch-Bearers (1922). She became famous as a comedian.

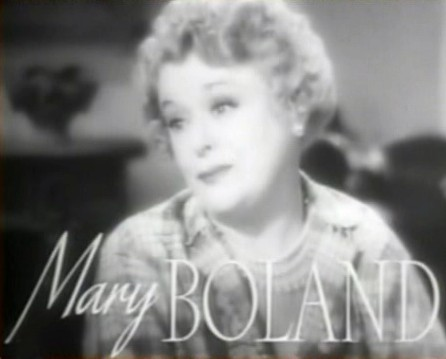
Trailer for The Women (1939)

Boland's greatest success on the stage in the 1920s was the comedy Cradle Snatchers (1925–26), in which she, Edna May Oliver, and Margaret Dale, having been abandoned by their husbands, take on young lovers. Roy Liebman notes this play helped establish the persona that would be associated with her for the rest of her career. Boland's paramour was Humphrey Bogart in one of his first roles. She had previously performed with Bogart in the 1923 comedy Meet the Wife at the Klaw Theatre as Gertrude Lennox. (Boland would later help out co-star Edna May Oliver in 1942, when illness forced Oliver to leave her new radio show, The Remarkable Miss Tuttle, after just two weeks. Boland took over the lead role as Miss Tuttle's sister, but later when it was determined that Oliver would not return the program was renamed The Remarkable Miss Crandall, with Boland still playing the lead. This version also lasted just two weeks).

After an eleven-year absence from films, in 1931, Boland returned to Hollywood under contract to Paramount Pictures. She achieved far greater film success with her second try, becoming one of the most popular character actresses of the 1930s, always playing major roles in her films and often starring, notably in a series of comedies opposite Charles Ruggles.

Boland appeared in numerous films, including Ruggles of Red Gap, The Big Broadcast of 1936, Danger - Love at Work, Nothing but Trouble, and Julia Misbehaves. She is likely best remembered for her portrayals of Countess DeLave in The Women (1939) and Mrs. Bennet in Pride and Prejudice (1940).

For the remainder of her career, Boland combined films and, later, television productions, with appearances on stage, including starring in the 1935 Cole Porter musical Jubilee and appearing in the play "One Fine Day" with Charlie Ruggles in 1948. Her last Broadway appearance was in 1954 at the age of seventy-two. That play, Lullaby, was unsuccessful. Her last acting was in the 1955 television adaptation of The Women recreating her film role.

== Personal life and death ==
On June 23, 1965, she died of a heart attack at her home in New York. She was interred in the Great Mausoleum, Sanctuary of Vespers in Forest Lawn Memorial Park Cemetery in Glendale, California.

== Recognition ==
For her contribution to the film industry, Boland has a motion pictures star on the Hollywood Walk of Fame at 6150 Hollywood Boulevard.

== Filmography ==
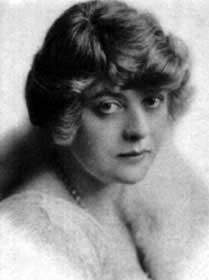
Boland, c. 1915

Silent

- The Edge of the Abyss (1915) - Alma Clayton
- The Price of Happiness (1916) - Bertha Miller
- His Bitter Pill (1916) - Jim's Mother
- The Stepping Stone (1916) - Mary Beresford
- Mountain Dew (1917) - Lily Bud Raines
- A Woman's Experience (1918, Extant; Library of Congress) - Agnes Roydant
- The Prodigal Wife (1918) - Marion Farnham
- The Perfect Lover (1919) - Mrs. Whitney
- His Temporary Wife (1920) - Verna Devore

Sound

- Secrets of a Secretary (1931) - Mrs. Merritt
- Personal Maid (1931) - Mrs. Otis Gary
- The Night of June 13 (1932) - Mazie Strawn
- Evenings for Sale (1932) - Jenny Kent
- If I Had a Million (1932) - Mrs. Peabody
- Mama Loves Papa (1933) - Jessie Todd
- Three-Cornered Moon (1933) - Mrs. Nellie Rimplegar
- The Solitaire Man (1933) - Mrs. Hopkins
- Four Frightened People (1934) - Mrs. Mardick
- Six of a Kind (1934) - Flora Whinney
- Melody in Spring (1934) - Mary Blodgett
- Stingaree (1934) - Mrs. Clarkson
- Here Comes the Groom (1934) - Mrs. Widden
- Down to Their Last Yacht (1934) - Queen of Malakamokalu, 'Queenie'
- The Pursuit of Happiness (1934) - Comfort Kirkland
- Ruggles of Red Gap (1935) - Effie Floud
- People Will Talk (1935) - Clarice Wilton
- Two for Tonight (1935) - Mrs. Smythe
- The Big Broadcast of 1936 (1935) - Mrs. Sealingsworth
- Early to Bed (1936) - Tessie Weeks
- A Son Comes Home (1936) - Mary Grady
- Wives Never Know (1936) - Marcia Bigelow
- College Holiday (1936) - Carola P. Gaye
- Marry the Girl (1937) - Ollie Radway
- Danger – Love at Work (1937) - Mrs. Alice Pemberton
- There Goes the Groom (1937) - Mrs. Russell
- Mama Runs Wild (1937) - Alice Summers
- Little Tough Guys in Society (1938) - Mrs. Berry
- Artists and Models Abroad (1938) - Mrs. Isabel Channing
- Boy Trouble (1939) - Sybil Fitch
- The Magnificent Fraud (1939) - Mme. Geraldine Genet
- Night Work (1939) - Sybil Fitch
- The Women (1939) - The Countess De Lave - Flora
- He Married His Wife (1940) - Ethel
- New Moon (1940) - Valerie de Rossac
- Pride and Prejudice (1940) - Mrs. Bennet
- Hit Parade of 1941 (1940) - Emily Potter
- One Night in the Tropics (1940) - Aunt Kitty Marblehead
- In Our Time (1944) - Mrs. Bromley
- Nothing but Trouble (1944) - Mrs. Hawkley
- Forever Yours (1945) - Aunt Mary
- Julia Misbehaves (1948) - Ma Ghenoccio
- Guilty Bystander (1950) - Smitty
