= War Dogs (1942 film) =

1942 film

- Directed by: S. Roy Luby
- Written by: John Vlahos (story and screenplay); Ande Lamb (idea)
- Produced by: George W. Weeks
- Starring: See below
- Cinematography: Robert E. Cline
- Edited by: S. Roy Luby
- Music by: Frank Sanucci
- Distributed by: Monogram Pictures
- Release date: November 13, 1942
- Running time: 64 minutes
- Country: United States
- Language: English

War Dogs is a 1942 American film directed by S. Roy Luby.

== Plot ==
A police dog is trained as a war dog by the army, after its donation by a young boy.

== Cast ==
- Billy Lee as Billy Freeman
- Addison Richards as Capt. William 'Wild Bill' Freeman
- Bradley Page as Judge Roger Davis
- Kay Linaker as Joan Allen
- Herbert Rawlinson as David J. Titus
- Lee Phelps as Sgt. Day
- John Berkes as Stoner – Grocer
- Bryant Washburn as Col. Mason
- George N. Neise as Hans – Saboteur
- Donald Curtis as Fred – Saboteur
- Hal Price as Officer Sullivan
- Steve Clark as Wilson – Senior dog trainer
- Ace the Wonder Dog as Pal – Billy's Dog

== Copyright status ==
The film is in the public domain.
