= Flight Lieutenant (film) =

1942 film by Sidney Salkow

- Film poster
- Directed by: Sidney Salkow
- Screenplay by: Michael Blankfort
- Story by: Richard Carroll (as Captain Richard Carroll); Betty Hopkins
- Produced by: B. P. Schulberg
- Starring: Pat O'Brien; Glenn Ford
- Cinematography: Franz Planer
- Edited by: Charles Nelson
- Music by: Werner R. Heymann
- Production company: Columbia Pictures
- Distributed by: Columbia Pictures
- Release date: July 9, 1942
- Running time: 80 minutes
- Country: United States
- Language: English

Flight Lieutenant (aka Flight Captain and He's My Old Man) is a 1942 American drama war film starring Pat O'Brien as Sam Doyle, a disgraced commercial pilot who works to regain the respect of his son (Glenn Ford) against the backdrop of World War II. Its advertising slogan was "roaring with thrills, throbbing with romance" with the love interest provided by Evelyn Keyes as Susie Thompson.

Flight Lieutenant was directed by Sidney Salkow, a Harvard Law School graduate who had himself served in the Pacific and been shot down.

== Plot ==
World War I combat pilot Sam Doyle has developed a drinking problem. In 1932, he causes the death of his co-pilot, William Thompson, and has his license revoked. A single parent, he leaves young Danny behind with a guardian and goes off to South America to find gainful employment. He leaves money to the dead co-pilot's widow and daughter, but the dead man's brother, John Thompson (Warren Ashe), wants revenge.

Danny grows up to be an expert pilot, becoming a Flight Lieutenant in the United States Army Air Corps. Thompson, now a major, becomes his superior officer. Neither has any knowledge of their shared history, even after Danny falls in love with Thompson's niece, Susie (Evelyn Keyes), and proposes marriage.

Sam Doyle returns, re-enlists and learns Danny is scheduled to test a new fighter aircraft that has a design flaw. Sam changes places with Danny at the last minute, flies but crashes the aircraft, saving future lives while sacrificing his own.

== Cast ==
- Pat O'Brien as Samuel J. 'Sam' Doyle
- Glenn Ford as Danny Doyle
- Evelyn Keyes as Susie Thompson
- Jonathan Hale as Joseph Sanford
- Douglas Croft as Danny Doyle - as a boy
- Ernie Adams as One-Legged Man (uncredited)
- Harry Anderson as Officer (uncredited)
- Warren Ashe as Mr. John Thompson (uncredited)
- Trevor Bardette as Carey (uncredited)
- Hugh Beaumont as Cadet John McGinnis (uncredited)
- James Blaine as Police Officer (uncredited)
- Lloyd Bridges as Cadet William "Bill" Robinson (uncredited) (Note: Throughout 1942, Lloyd Bridges appeared in 24 films, most, like Flight Lieutenant, as "uncredited".)

== Production ==
Production dates for Flight Lieutenant were from March 16 to April 18, 1942.

The aircraft in Flight Lieutenant were:

- Ford Trimotor 4 ATE
- Stearman C3B (in background)
- Brown B-3
- Stinson A
- Fairchild 24

== Reception ==
A review in The New York Times considered that Flight Lieutenant was a "dreary father-and-son tale" with much mawkish sentimentality.
