= Billy Lee (actor) =

American actor

- Born: William Lee Schlensker; March 12, 1929; Indiana, U.S.
- Died: November 17, 1989 (aged 60); Beaumont, California, U.S.
- Years active: 1934–1942

Billy Lee (born William Lee Schlensker; March 12, 1929 – November 17, 1989) was an American child actor who appeared in many films from the mid-1930s through the early 1940s. He is probably best remembered for his performance in The Biscuit Eater.

Lee's first role was in the Our Gang comedy short Mike Fright as a tap dancer in a sailor suit. He was signed under contract with Paramount Pictures from 1934 to 1941 and his first significant role was in Wagon Wheels when he was just four years old.

Lee continued acting throughout the 1930s, appearing in a number of movies (among others: Too Many Parents, Easy to Take, Three Cheers for Love, Silk Hat Kid, The Big Broadcast of 1937, Sons of the Legion, Say It in French, Boy Trouble, Night Work, Sudden Money, Nobody's Children, Hold Back the Dawn, Nevada City, Road to Happiness) and working alongside some of Hollywood's finest, including, Donald O'Connor, Lon Chaney Jr., Roy Rogers, Charles Boyer, Randolph Scott, Lew Ayres, Gene Autry, Robert Cummings, Basil Rathbone, Olivia de Havilland, John Boles, Fred MacMurray, Ray Milland and Broderick Crawford). He also did the voice of "The Boy" character in the animated portion of the Disney film, The Reluctant Dragon.

In addition to being an actor, he was also a singer and dancer, appearing and singing with Bobby Breen in Make a Wish and touring with vaudeville shows. For his role in Cocoanut Grove he learnt to play the drums and formed the Billy Lee Band. The band appeared in the 1941 film, Reg'lar Fellers, in which he starred with co-star Carl Switzer.

Lee retired from film in 1943 after his last film War Dogs.

Lee died on November 17, 1989, of a sudden heart attack.

== Filmography ==
- Mike Fright (1934, short) as Tap Dancer
- Wagon Wheels (1934) as Sonny Wellington
- Behold My Wife! (1934) as Young Indian Boy at Meal (uncredited)
- One Hour Late (1934) as Junior (uncredited)
- Silk Hat Kid (1935) as Tommy
- Two Fisted (1935) as Jimmy Parker
- Babes in Hollywood (1935, short) as Jimmy
- Too Many Parents (1936) as Billy Miller
- Sky Parade (1936) as Jimmie Allen, age 4 (uncredited)
- And Sudden Death (1936) as Bobbie Sanborn
- Three Cheers for Love (1936) as Johnny
- The Arizona Raiders (1936) as Little Boy (uncredited)
- The Big Broadcast of 1937 (1936) as Train Bearer
- Rose Bowl (1936) as Young Boy (uncredited)
- Easy to Take (1936) as Bill Ardmore Jr.
- Arizona Mahoney (1936) as Kid
- Wild Money (1937) as Malcolm West
- Exclusive (1937) as Beak's Child (uncredited)
- Make a Wish (1937) as Pee Wee
- Thunder Trail (1937) as Bob at 8
- Cocoanut Grove (1938) as Half Pint
- Sons of the Legion (1938) as Billy Lee
- Say It in French (1938) as Boy with Lollipop
- Ambush (1938) as Boy at Restaurant
- Boy Trouble (1939) as Joe
- Sudden Money (1939) as Junior Patterson
- Let Us Live (1939) as Boy in Window
- Outside These Walls (1939) as Little Boy (uncredited)
- Coast Guard (1939) as Seaman (uncredited)
- Night Work (1939) as Joe Fitch
- In Old Monterey (1939) as Jimmy Whittaker
- Jeepers Creepers (1939) as Skeeter
- All Women Have Secrets (1939) as Bobby
- Parole Fixer (1940) as Jimmy Mattison
- The Biscuit Eater (1940) as Lonnie McNeil
- Nobody’s Children (1940) as Tommy
- The Reluctant Dragon (1940) as The Boy (segment “The Reluctant Dragon”) voice
- Power Dive (1941) as Brad Coles
- Nevada City (1941) as Chick Morrison
- The Reluctant Dragon (1941) The Boy (voice)
- Reg’lar Fellers (1941) as Pinhead Duffy
- Hold Back the Dawn (1941) as Tony
- Road to Happiness (1941) as Danny Carter
- Eyes of the Underworld (1942) as Mickey Bryan
- Mrs Wiggs of the Cabbage Patch (1942) as Jimmy Wiggs
- War Dogs (1942) as Billy Freeman
- The Ford Theater Hour (1950)
- Starlight Theater (1950)
- Love Is Better Than Ever (1952) as Little Boy (uncredited)
- Limelight (1952) as Little Boy (uncredited)
- Thy Neighbor’s Wife (1953)
- Medallion Theater (1954)
- Ponds Theater (1952)
- Ethel and Albert (1954)
- Kraft Theatre (1954)

== Bibliography ==
- Holmstrom, John (1996). The Moving Picture Boy: An International Encyclopaedia from 1895 to 1995. Norwich, Michael Russell, p. 165-166.
- Best, Marc (1971). Those Endearing Young Charms: Child Performers of the Screen. South Brunswick and New York: Barnes & Co., p. 144-147.
- Willson, Dixie (1935). Little Hollywood Stars. Akron, OH, e New York: Saalfield Pub. Co., p. 133-142.
- Lamparski, Richard (1986). Whatever Became of...?. (Tenth Series). New York: Crown Publishers, p. 96-97.
- Liebman, Roy (2009). Musical Groups in the Movies, 1929-1970. Jefferson, N.C.: McFarland & Company, Inc. Publishers, p. 22.
