= Early to Bed (1936 film) =

1936 film by Norman Z. McLeod

- Directed by: Norman Z. McLeod
- Written by: Arthur Kober; Lucien Littlefield; S. J. Perelman; Chandler Sprague
- Produced by: Harlan Thompson
- Starring: Mary Boland; Charlie Ruggles; George Barbier; Gail Patrick; Robert McWade; Lucien Littlefield
- Cinematography: Henry Sharp
- Edited by: LeRoy Stone
- Production company: Paramount Pictures
- Distributed by: Paramount Pictures
- Release date: June 5, 1936
- Running time: 75 minutes
- Country: United States
- Language: English

Early to Bed is a 1936 American comedy film directed by Norman Z. McLeod, written by Arthur Kober, Lucien Littlefield, S. J. Perelman and Chandler Sprague, and starring Mary Boland, Charlie Ruggles, George Barbier, Gail Patrick, Robert McWade and Lucien Littlefield. It was released on June 25, 1936, by Paramount Pictures.

== Plot ==
Chester Beatty and Tessie Weeks have been engaged for 5 years and going together for 15 years before that. Chester is reluctant to burden Tessie with marriage because of his secret problem. He is a sleepwalker. When Tessie finally does rope Chester into marriage, he cannot get time off from his boss of 26 years, Mr. Frisbee. To solve the problem, Chester sets out to impress his boss by securing a big sales contract of glass eyes. He takes Tessie and follows the rich doll company owner Horace B. Stanton to a lakeside resort and befriends him. However, his sleepwalking make him a prime suspect in a theft/murder case.

== Cast ==
- Mary Boland as Tessie Weeks
- Charlie Ruggles as Chester Beatty
- George Barbier as Horace Stanton
- Gail Patrick as Grace Stanton
- Robert McWade as Burgess Frisbie
- Lucien Littlefield as Mr. O'Leary
- Colin Tapley as Doctor Vernon
- Helen Flint as Mrs. Duvall
- Rae Daggett as Miss Benson
- Sidney Blackmer as Rex Daniels
- Arthur Hoyt as Smithers
- Billy Gilbert as Burger

== Reception ==
TV Guide described the film as "silly fun, but Ruggles and Boland make a good team."
