= Burns and Allen =

American comedic duo

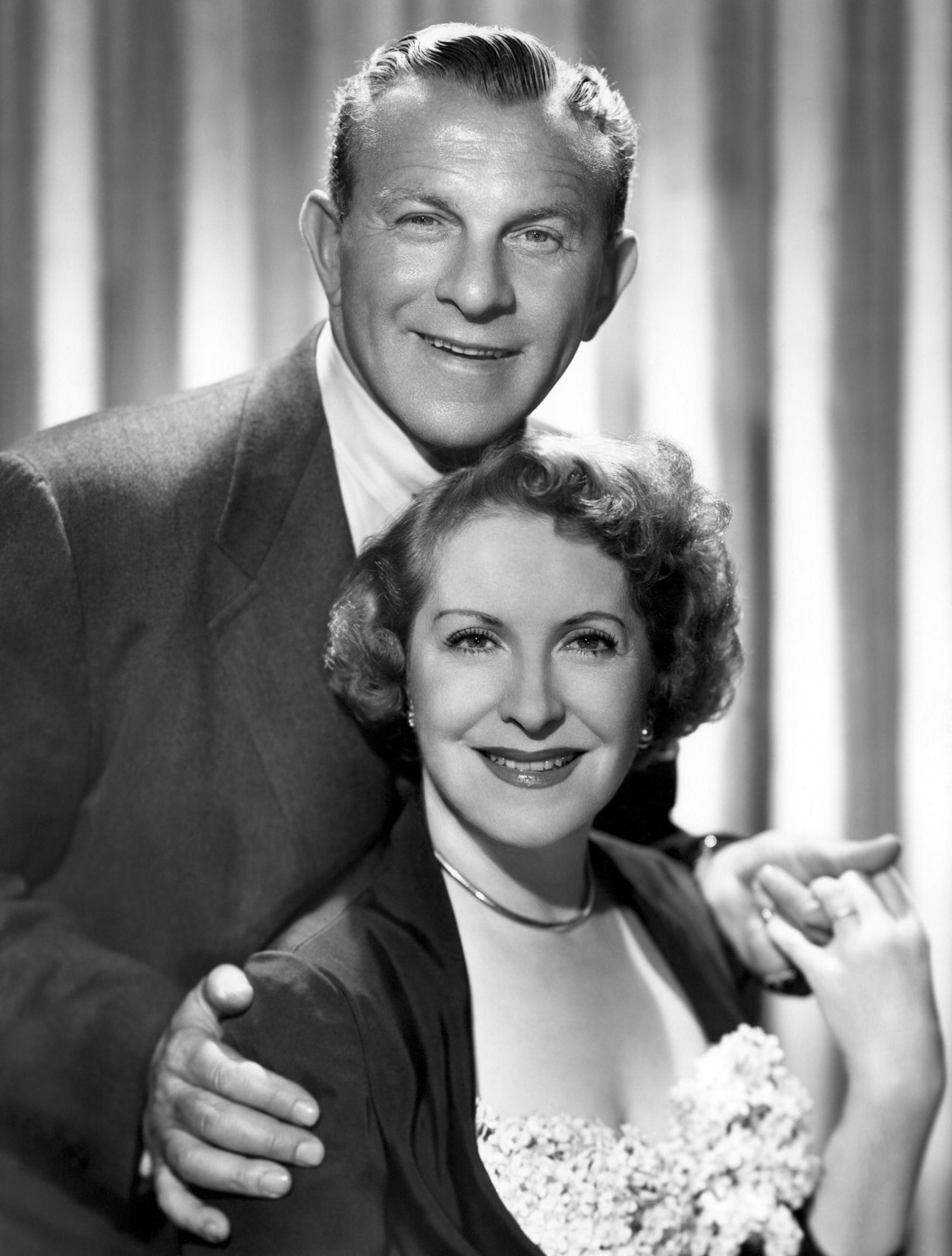
- Burns (top) and Allen (bottom) in a 1952 publicity photo
- Notable work: The Burns and Allen Show (radio), The George Burns and Gracie Allen Show (TV)

Comedy career
- Years active: 1922–1958
- Medium: Vaudeville, radio, television, film
- Former members: George Burns; Gracie Allen

Burns and Allen were an American comedy duo consisting of George Burns and his wife Gracie Allen. They worked together as a successful comedy team that entertained vaudeville, film, radio, and television audiences for over forty years.

The duo met in 1922 and married in 1926. Burns played the straight man and Allen played a silly, addle-headed woman whose convoluted logic Burns was often ill-equipped to challenge. The duo starred in a number of films, including Lambchops (1929), The Big Broadcast (1932), its two sequels (1935 and 1936), and A Damsel in Distress (1937). Their 30-minute radio show debuted in September 1934 as The Adventures of Gracie, whose title changed to The Burns and Allen Show in 1936; the series ran, moving back and forth between NBC and CBS, until May 1950. After their radio show's cancellation, Burns and Allen reemerged on television with a popular sitcom, which ran from 1950 to 1958.

Burns and Allen's radio show was inducted into the National Radio Hall of Fame in 1994. Their TV series received a total of 11 Primetime Emmy Award nominations, and its episode "Columbia Pictures Doing Burns and Allen Story" was ranked No. 56 on TV Guide's 100 Greatest Episodes of All Time in 1997. They were inducted into the Television Hall of Fame in 1988.

== Vaudeville ==
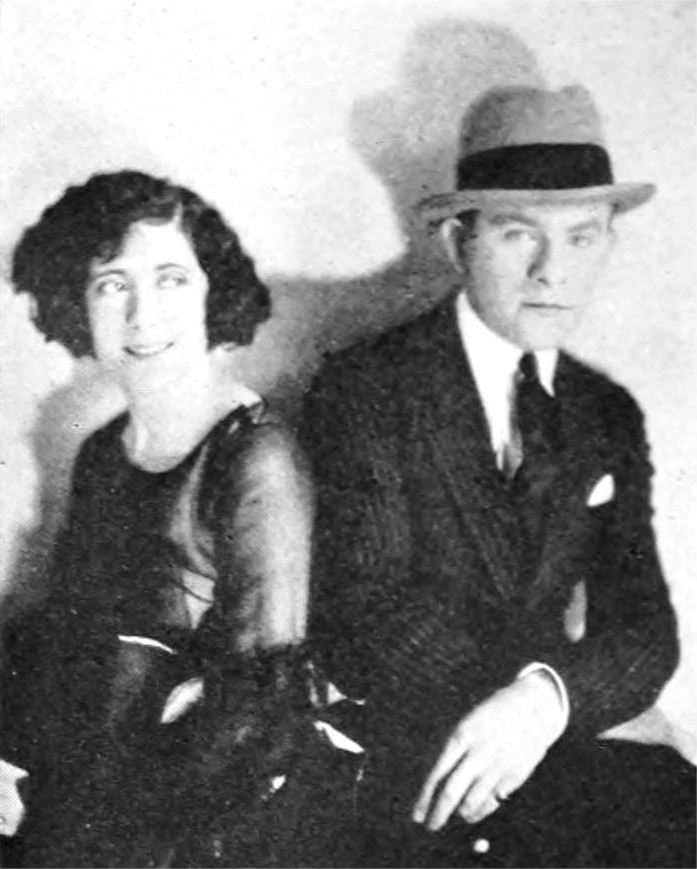
Burns and Allen on the vaudeville circuit in 1924

Burns and Allen met in 1922 and first performed together at the Hill Street Theatre in Newark, New Jersey and continued in small-town vaudeville theaters. They married in Cleveland on January 7, 1926, and moved up a notch when they signed with the Keith-Albee-Orpheum circuit in 1927.

Burns wrote most of the material and played the straight man. Allen played a silly, addle-headed woman, a role often attributed to the 'Dumb Dora' stereotype common in early 20th-century vaudeville comedy. The team had played the opposite roles until they noticed that the audience was laughing at Allen's straight lines, so they made the change. In later years, each attributed their own success to the other.

The Burns and Allen team was not an overnight sensation. Burns said, "We were a good man-and-woman act, but we were not headliners or stars or featured attractions. We were on the bill with them. There would be a star or two stars and a featured attraction, and then we would come—fourth billing in an eight-act show." Their career changed direction when they appeared in their first film.

== Motion pictures ==
In the early days of talking pictures, the studios eagerly hired actors who knew how to deliver dialogue or songs. The most prolific of these studios was Warner Bros., whose Vitaphone Varieties shorts captured vaudeville headliners of the 1920s on film.

Burns and Allen, who had earned a reputation as a reliable "disappointment act" (one that could substitute for another performer on a moment's notice), were last-minute replacements for Fred Allen in Lambchops (1929), in which they performed their patter-and-song routine.

Burns and Allen in Fit to Be Tied, a 1930 short film made under Paramount Pictures

Paramount Pictures used its East Coast studio to film New York-based stage and vaudeville stars. Eddie Cantor, Fred Allen, Ethel Merman and Smith and Dale were among the top acts seen in Paramount shorts. Burns and Allen joined the Paramount roster in 1930 and appeared in a string of one-reel comedies through 1933, usually written by Burns and featuring future Hollywood character actors such as Barton MacLane and Chester Clute.

In 1932, Paramount produced an all-star musical comedy, The Big Broadcast, featuring the nation's hottest radio personalities, including Burns and Allen. Their favorably received performance was followed by guest appearances in Paramount features through 1937. Most of these used the Big Broadcast formula of an all-star comedy cast. In 1935 they also starred in a pair of low-budget features, Here Comes Cookie and Love in Bloom.

At RKO, Fred Astaire succeeded in his efforts to make a musical feature without Ginger Rogers, and the studio borrowed Burns and Allen from Paramount for the 1937 film A Damsel in Distress. Their names appeared with Astaire's before the title. Under contract to RKO, the young Joan Fontaine was assigned as Astaire's romantic interest, but when she proved to be an inadequate dance partner, Astaire performed most of his dancing with Burns and Allen. The trio's comic dance in the film's funhouse sequence earned an Academy Award for choreographer Hermes Pan. Burns suggested a dance number that employed whiskbrooms as props, used in vaudeville by a duo called Evans and Evans. He bought the idea and auditioned the routine for Astaire, with Allen and the surviving member of the Evans and Evans team.

Metro-Goldwyn-Mayer cast Burns and Allen in its Eleanor Powell musical Honolulu (1939). This was their last film as a team; Allen appeared in two subsequent films on her own, but Burns and Allen did not return to the cameras until their television series in 1950.

When Burns was 79, he had a sudden career revival as an amiable, beloved and unusually active comedic elder statesman in the 1975 film The Sunshine Boys, for which he won the Academy Award for Best Supporting Actor. In 1977, his starring role in Oh, God!, along with the former film, permanently secured his career resurgence. At the age of 80, Burns was the oldest Oscar winner in the history of the Academy Awards, a record that stood until Jessica Tandy won an Oscar for Driving Miss Daisy in 1989. Burns, who became a centenarian in 1996, continued to work until just weeks before his death of cardiac arrest on March 19, 1996, at his home in Beverly Hills.

=== Filmography ===
Year	Title	Format	Notes
1929	Lambchops	Short	Added to the National Film Registry in 1999. DVD release 2007
1930	Fit to Be Tied	Short	
1931	Pulling a Bone	Short	
1931	The Antique Shop	Short	Directed by Ray Cozine
1931	Once Over, Light	Short	Directed by Howard Bretherton
1931	100% Service	Short	Directed by Ray Cozine. DVD release 2006
1931	Oh, My Operation	Short	Directed by Ray Cozine
1932	The Babbling Book	Short	
1932	The Big Broadcast	Feature	
1932	Your Hat	Short	
1932	Walking the Baby	Short	Directed by Aubrey Scotto
1933	Let's Dance	Short	Directed by Aubrey Scotto
1933	International House	Feature	
1933	College Humor	Feature	
1934	Six of a Kind	Feature	
1934	We're Not Dressing	Feature	
1934	Many Happy Returns	Feature	
1935	Love in Bloom	Feature	
1935	Here Comes Cookie	Feature	
1935	The Big Broadcast of 1936	Feature	
1936	The Big Broadcast of 1937	Feature	
1936	College Holiday	Feature	
1937	A Damsel in Distress	Feature	
1938	College Swing	Feature	
1939	Honolulu	Feature	

== Radio ==
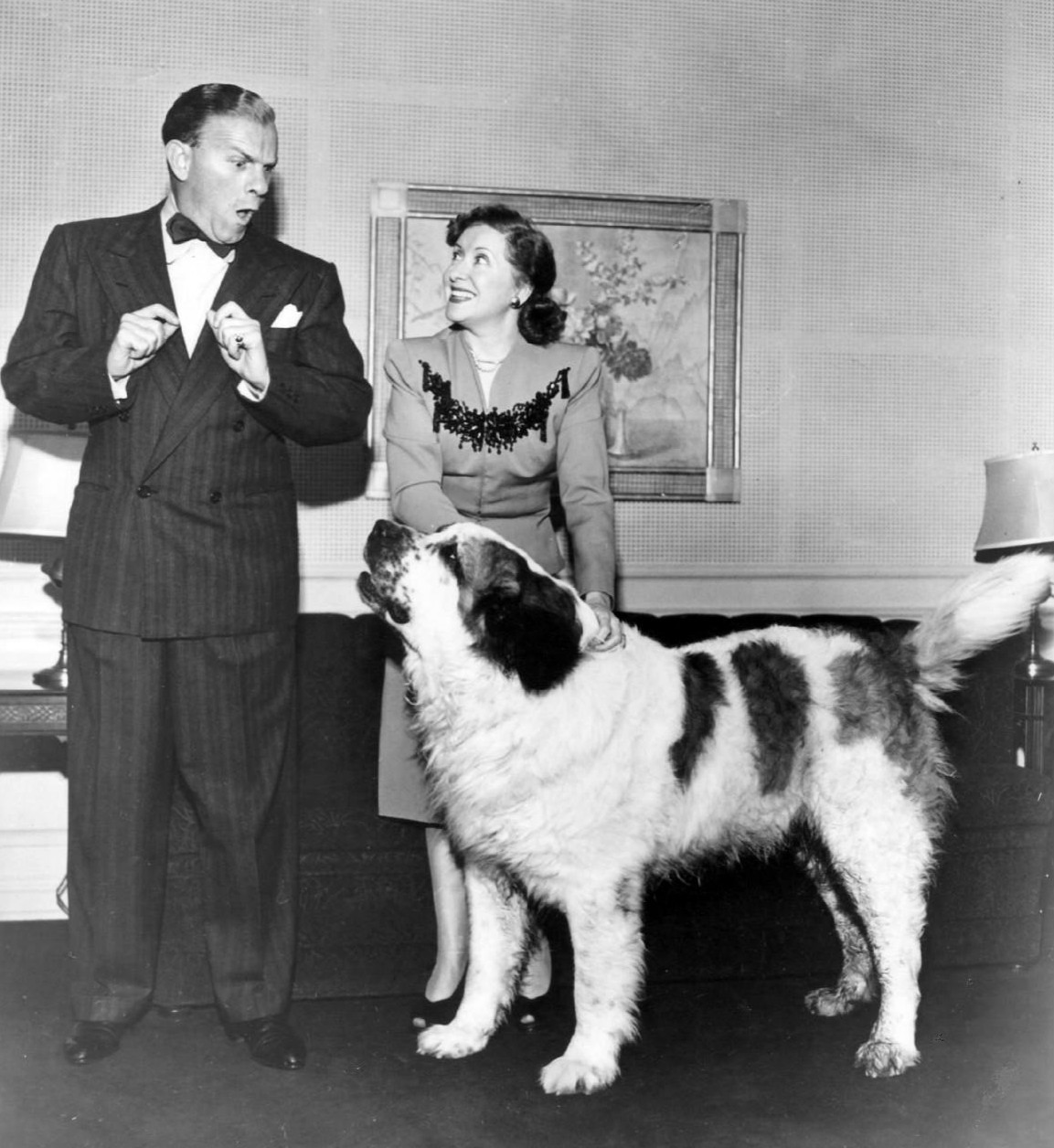
Burns and Allen on NBC radio's Maxwell House Coffee Time (c. 1946)

In 1929, Burns and Allen made their debut radio performance broadcast in London on the BBC. In the United States, they failed at a 1930 NBC audition. After a solo appearance by Allen on Eddie Cantor's radio show, they were heard together on Rudy Vallée's The Fleischmann's Yeast Hour and on February 15, 1932, they became regulars on The Guy Lombardo Show on CBS. When Lombardo switched to NBC, Burns and Allen took his CBS spot with The Adventures of Gracie, beginning on September 19, 1934.

Along the way, the duo launched a running gag that made them radio stars: the fictitious hunt for Allen's lost brother, which began on January 4, 1933 and eventually became a cross-network phenomenon. Allen also appeared on other shows (especially those produced by the J. Walter Thompson advertising agency, which produced the Burns and Allen series) looking for her brother. Bad publicity after a bid by NBC to squelch the stunt—and an accidental mention by Rudy Vallée on his Fleischmann's Hour—helped it continue. Allen's real brother, a shy accountant living in San Francisco, went into hiding until the gag ran its course.

Burns and Allen followed this with another running gag in which Allen launched a comedic and fictitious run for the presidency. During the election year of 1940, she represented the fictitious Surprise Party and advocated nonsense as part of her platform. Allen actually received write-in votes on election day.

The title of their top-rated show changed to The George Burns and Gracie Allen Show on September 26, 1936. In 1941, they moved from comedy patter into a successful sitcom format, continuing with shows on NBC and CBS until May 17, 1950. As in the early days of radio, the sponsor's name became the show title, such as Maxwell House Coffee Time (1945–49).

The show featured several radio regulars, including Toby Reed, Gale Gordon, Bea Benaderet, Mel Blanc, Allen's real-life friend Mary "Bubbles" Kelly, Ray Noble, singers Jimmy Cash and Tony Martin and actor/writer/director Elliott Lewis. The Sportsmen Quartet (appearing as the Swantet during the years when the show was sponsored by Swan soap) supplied songs and occasionally backed Cash. Meredith Willson, Artie Shaw and announcers Bill Goodwin and Harry Von Zell were often involved in the scripts, usually as additional comic foils for Burns and Allen.

For a long time, Burns and Allen continued their flirtation act with Burns as Allen's most persistent suitor. Their real-life marriage was not written into the show until 1941, when Burns noticed that their ratings were slowly but steadily slipping. He realized that he and Allen "were too old for our jokes" and revised the format to include husband-and-wife characters in a situation-comedy setting. Burns' assessment was correct, and the Burns and Allen program went on to even greater success.

=== Broadcast history ===
Year	Title	Notes
1929	BBC, London	Debut radio performance broadcast of Burns and Allen.
February 15, 1932 – September 13, 1933	The Robert Burns Panatela Program	CBS, 30 minutes Burns and Allen join Guy Lombardo as featured performers Becomes The White Owl Program May 31, 1933
December 20, 1933 – June 13, 1934	The White Owl Program	CBS, 30 minutes Burns and Allen headline their own show
September 19, 1934 – September 25, 1935	The Adventures of Gracie	CBS, 30 minutes
October 2, 1935 – March 24, 1937	The Adventures of Gracie	CBS, 30 minutes Called The Burns and Allen Show after the broadcast September 23, 1936
April 12, 1937 – August 1, 1938	The Burns and Allen Show	NBC, 30 minutes
September 30, 1938 – June 23, 1939	The Burns and Allen Show	CBS, 30 minutes
October 4, 1939 – June 26, 1940	The Burns and Allen Show	CBS, 30 minutes
July 1, 1940 – March 24, 1941	The Burns and Allen Show	NBC, 30 minutes
October 7, 1941 – June 30, 1942	The Burns and Allen Show	NBC, 30 minutes
October 6, 1942 – June 29, 1943	The Burns and Allen Show	CBS, 30 minutes
August 31, 1943 – June 13, 1944	The Burns and Allen Show	CBS, 30 minutes
August 15, 1944 – June 25, 1945	The Burns and Allen Show	CBS, 30 minutes
September 20, 1945 – May 30, 1946	The Burns and Allen Show	NBC, 30 minutes
September 5, 1946 – May 29, 1947	The Burns and Allen Show	NBC, 30 minutes
September 4, 1947 – June 10, 1948	The Burns and Allen Show	NBC, 30 minutes
September 30, 1948 – June 23, 1949	The Burns and Allen Show	NBC, 30 minutes
September 21, 1949 – May 17, 1950	The Burns and Allen Show	CBS, 30 minutes

=== Accolades ===
The Burns and Allen Show was inducted into the National Radio Hall of Fame in 1994.

== Television ==
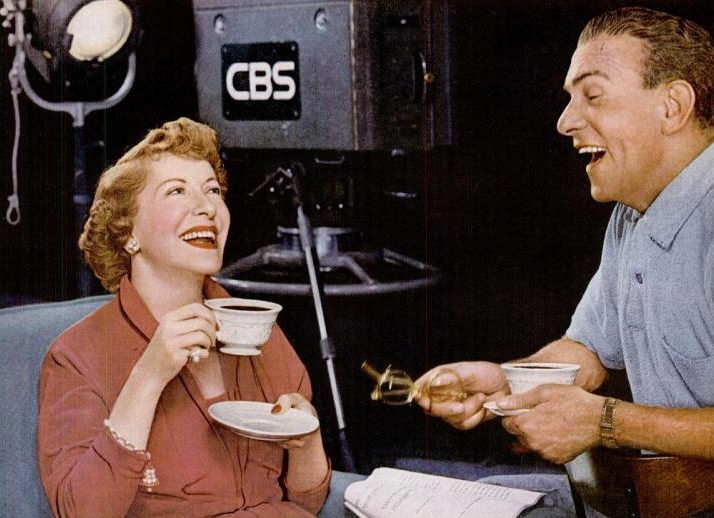
Burns and Allen in 1953

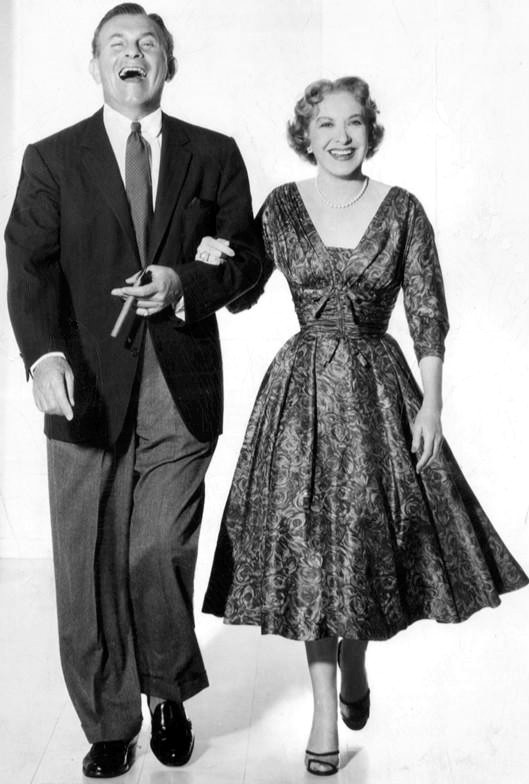
Burns and Allen in 1955

In 1950, Burns and Allen transitioned to television with The George Burns and Gracie Allen Show. An immediate success, the half-hour situation comedy was broadcast on CBS from October 12, 1950, to September 22, 1958. The show was initially staged live in New York and presented every other week. In the fall of 1952, it became a weekly series filmed on the West Coast. With 291 episodes, the show had a long network run through 1958 and continued in syndicated reruns for years.

The sets were designed to resemble the couple's real-life residence. An establishing shot of the actual house on Maple Drive in Beverly Hills, California was often used. Although extensively remodeled, the house still exists, and Burns lived there until his death in 1996 at the age of 100.

The format had Burns watching all of the action (standing outside the proscenium arch in early live episodes and watching the show on TV in his study toward the end of the series) and breaking the fourth wall by commenting upon it to the viewers.

During the course of the eight-year run, the TV show had remarkable consistency in its cast and crew. The episodes were produced and directed by Ralph Levy (1950–53); Frederick de Cordova, later director of NBC's The Tonight Show Starring Johnny Carson (1953–56); and Rod Amateau (1956–58). The original writing staff consisted of Sid Dorfman, Harvey Helm, Paul Henning and William Burns (George's brother).

Bea Benaderet was maintained from the radio show, portraying neighbor Blanche Morton. Her husband Harry Morton was portrayed by Hal March (October–December 1950), John Brown (January–June 1951), Fred Clark (until 1953) and finally Larry Keating. Also appearing in the TV series were Burns and Allen's two adopted children, Ronnie and Sandra. Ronnie became a near-regular on the show, playing himself but cast as a young drama student who tended to look askance at his parents' comedy style. Sandra declined a regular role, although she appeared in a few episodes, usually as a secretary or the voice of a telephone operator.

In March 1953, The George Burns and Gracie Allen Show joined I Love Lucy as part of the CBS Monday night prime-time lineup. As a result, the show entered the top 30 television programs in the Nielsen ratings ranking at No. 20. For the 1954–1955 season, it ranked No. 26, and for both the 1955–56 and 1956–57 seasons it was No. 28. With I Love Lucy ending its six-year run on CBS in the spring of 1957, the television network wanted to renew the Burns and Allen series, but by this time Allen had grown tired of the grind. Nevertheless, Burns committed both of them for another year, which would be their eighth—and last—on television.

Allen announced her retirement on February 17, 1958, effective at the end of that season.

Burns and Allen filmed their last show on June 4, 1958. The filming was an emotional experience, although nothing was said about it being Allen's last performance. At the wrap party, Allen took a sip of champagne, hugged her friend and co-star Benaderet and said "Okay, that's it." After one last look around the set, she said, "And thank you very much, everyone."

"She deserved a rest," Burns said when Allen devoted herself to gardening and being a housewife:

She had been working all her life, and her lines were the toughest in the world to do. They didn't make sense, so she had to memorize every word. It took a real actress. Every spare moment—in bed, under the hair dryer—had to be spent in learning lines. Do you wonder that she's happy to be rid of it?

Burns attempted to continue the show with the same supporting cast but without Allen. The George Burns Show lasted one season (October 21, 1958 – April 14, 1959) on NBC.

Following a mild heart attack in the 1950s, Allen suffered a series of angina episodes over a number of years. She suffered a major heart attack in 1961 and then lived a slower but comfortable retirement for another three years, often appearing in public with her husband but never performing. She died on August 27, 1964.

=== Accolades ===
The George Burns and Gracie Allen Show received a total of 11 Primetime Emmy Award nominations.

In 1997, the 1954 episode "Columbia Pictures Doing Burns and Allen Story" was ranked No. 56 on TV Guide's 100 Greatest Episodes of All Time.

=== McCadden Productions ===
The George Burns and Gracie Allen Show was produced under the banner of McCadden Productions, a company run by Burns that he named after the street on which his brother William lived. While the series was in production, Burns began producing other television shows and commercials. McCadden Productions employed more than 300 people and produced series including Mister Ed, The Bob Cummings Show, The People's Choice, The Marie Wilson Show and Panic!. The McCadden catalog is currently owned by Sony Pictures Television.

Burns wrote: "Television was still so new that nobody really knew what kinds of shows the audience would watch, but I figured that people would like the same things on television that they liked in vaudeville, so we did shows with pretty girls and animals."

== Legacy ==
Known for his philanthropy, Burns offered numerous contributions to the Cedars-Sinai Medical Center in Los Angeles. The hospital is located at the intersection of George Burns Road, dedicated in 1986, and Gracie Allen Drive, dedicated in 1995. The George Burns–Gracie Allen Chair in Cardiology was established in 1989. The Burns and Allen Research Institute was dedicated in 1996 on Burns' 100th birthday.

The computerized voices on San Francisco's BART PA system are officially named "George and Gracie" in their honor. Similarly, the pair of whales featured in the film Star Trek IV: The Voyage Home are named George and Gracie.

== Sources and further reading ==
- Blythe, Cheryl & Sackett, Susan (1986). Say Good Night, Gracie!: The Story of Burns and Allen. New York: E.P. Dutton. ISBN 0-525-24386-0.
- Burns, George (1988). Gracie: A Love Story. New York: Putnam. ISBN 0-399-13384-4.
- Burns, George & Lindsay, Cynthia (1955). I Love Her, That's Why!. New York: Simon and Schuster.
- Clements, Cynthia & Weber, Sandra (1996). George Burns and Gracie Allen: A Bio-Bibliography. Westport, CT: Greenwood Press. ISBN 0-313-26883-5.
- Eagan, Eileen (1996). "'Our Town' in Cold War America: The George Burns and Gracie Allen Show (1950–1958)". Film & History. 26 (1–4): 62–70. doi:10.1353/flm.1996.a395958. S2CID 162053631.
- Morris, J.K. (March 1953). "Gracie Allen's Own Story: Inside Me". Woman's Home Companion: 127.
- Staples, Shirley (1984). Male-Female Comedy Teams in American Vaudeville, 1865–1932. Ann Arbor, MI: UMI Research Press. ISBN 0-8357-1520-5.
