= Million Dollar Ransom =

1934 film directed by Murray Roth

- Directed by: Murray Roth
- Screenplay by: William R. Lipman; Ben Ryan
- Produced by: Carl Laemmle, Jr.
- Starring: Phillips Holmes; Edward Arnold; Mary Carlisle; Wini Shaw; Andy Devine; Robert Gleckler
- Cinematography: George Robinson
- Edited by: Murray Seldeen
- Music by: Edward Ward
- Production company: Universal Pictures
- Distributed by: Universal Pictures
- Release date: September 1, 1934
- Running time: 70 minutes
- Country: United States
- Language: English

Million Dollar Ransom is a 1934 American drama film directed by Murray Roth and written by William R. Lipman and Ben Ryan. The film stars Phillips Holmes, Edward Arnold, Mary Carlisle, Wini Shaw, Andy Devine and Robert Gleckler. The film was released on September 1, 1934, by Universal Pictures.

== Plot ==
To stop his mother from marrying a man he does not like, a young millionaire hires an ex-con help him fake his own kidnapping.

== Cast ==
- Phillips Holmes as Stanton Casserly
- Edward Arnold as Vincent Shelton
- Mary Carlisle as Francesca Shelton
- Wini Shaw as Babe
- Andy Devine as Careful
- Robert Gleckler as 'Doc' Carson
- Marjorie Gateson as Elita Casserly
- Edgar Norton as Meigs
- Bradley Page as Easy
