= Don't Bet on Love =

1933 film

- Directed by: Murray Roth
- Screenplay by: Howard Emmett Rogers; Murray Roth; Ben Ryan
- Produced by: Carl Laemmle, Jr.
- Starring: Lew Ayres; Ginger Rogers; Charley Grapewin; Shirley Grey; Tom Dugan; Merna Kennedy
- Cinematography: Jackson Rose
- Edited by: Robert Carlisle
- Production company: Universal Pictures
- Distributed by: Universal Pictures
- Release date: July 1, 1933
- Running time: 62 minutes
- Country: United States
- Language: English

Don't Bet on Love is a 1933 American comedy film directed by Murray Roth and written by Howard Emmett Rogers, Murray Roth and Ben Ryan. The film stars Lew Ayres, Ginger Rogers, Charley Grapewin, Shirley Grey, Tom Dugan and Merna Kennedy. The film was released on July 1, 1933, by Universal Pictures.

== Plot ==
Molly Gilbert won't accept a marriage proposal from Bill McCaffery unless he promises to quit betting money on horse races. He gives her his word, but Molly is miffed when she realizes he wants to honeymoon in Saratoga, New York, due to its proximity to the racetrack.

Behind her back, Bill unethically uses money from his dad Pop McCaffery's plumbing business to continue gambling. He gets on a hot streak, winning $50,000, then buys a horse of his own, cheats by disguising a faster horse as his, then loses all his money. Bill agrees to become a plumber, pleasing Molly.

== Cast ==
- Lew Ayres as Bill McCaffery
- Ginger Rogers as Molly Gilbert
- Charley Grapewin as Pop McCaffery
- Shirley Grey as Goldie Williams
- Tom Dugan as Scotty
- Merna Kennedy as Ruby 'Babe' Norton
- Lucile Gleason as Mrs. Gilbert
- Robert Emmett O'Connor as Edward Shelton
