= 18 Again! =

1988 film by Paul Flaherty

- Theatrical release poster
- Directed by: Paul Flaherty
- Written by: Josh Goldstein; Jonathan Prince
- Produced by: Walter Coblenz
- Starring: George Burns; Charlie Schlatter; Tony Roberts; Anita Morris; Red Buttons
- Cinematography: Stephen M. Katz
- Edited by: Danford B. Greene
- Music by: Billy Goldenberg
- Distributed by: New World Pictures
- Release date: April 8, 1988
- Running time: 93 minutes
- Country: United States
- Language: English
- Box office: $2.5 million

18 Again! is a 1988 American fantasy-comedy film directed by Paul Flaherty and starring George Burns and Charlie Schlatter. The plot involves a college student switching souls with his grandfather by means of an accident. The film is based on the song "I Wish I Was Eighteen Again" written by Sonny Throckmorton and recorded by Burns in 1979.

== Plot ==
Jack Watson is a millionaire playboy and businessman who is about to turn 81 years old just as his grandson David is about to turn 18, but Jack laments his old age and wishes to get back to his teens once more. When an accident switches their souls, Jack gets to live his grandson's life and all that it entails: school, sports, and romance. Unfortunately, David gets the "short end of the deal", as not only is he trapped in his grandfather's 81-year-old body, but he is also in a coma. The only one who knows the truth is his longtime friend Charlie, whom Jack was able to convince by recounting experiences only they knew.

Jack gets to approach his family from a fresh point of view and doesn't always like what he sees: he's been a distant parent for his son Arnie and has repeatedly disregarded his ideas for improving the family company. The college fraternity that he coerced David into joining (his old alma mater) is bullying him on a regular basis and forcing him to write their test finals for them. He also finds out that his girlfriend Madeline is unfaithful when she tries to seduce him, thinking he's Jack's grandson. Deciding to set things right, Jack in David's body decides to take charge by convincing his father (or rather, Jack's son) to implement his ideas on the family business and uses his poker playing skills to beat the frat boys while betting $1000 that he will beat the lead frat boy Russ in the upcoming track meet. Jack also impresses a girl named Robin, who is taken with David's old-fashioned style with bow ties and his vividly recounting the Second World War and meeting President Harry S. Truman.

However, Jack realizes too late that he has willed half of everything to Madeline, who convinces Arnie and his wife to disconnect Jack's 81-year-old body from life support. Knowing that this will kill David, Jack and Charlie rush to the hospital to prevent this, wheeling Jack's body away from an orderly. When they crash in the hospital chapel, Jack and David's minds are returned to their rightful bodies, and Jack awakens. Jack still has unfinished business, as in David's body he challenged the fraternity president to a race, and now David must face him.

Jack gives David a pep talk, and David beats the frat president. Jack then encourages David to pursue an interested Robin. In private, Jack tells Arnie that his greatest mistake was trying to get him and David to relive his own life, and encourages Arnie to nurture David's interest in art, which Jack will do as well by getting David involved in the graphic design aspect of the family business. Finally, Jack confronts Madeline by saying he knows that she made a pass at David and is well aware that she is a gold digger only interested in his bank account. He throws her out of the house and lets her know that he has rewritten his will to include his family and his faithful butler Horton, whom he promptly orders to have Madeline thrown out. Robin and David start their relationship, and the movie finishes with Jack telling David everything about Harry S. Truman.

== Cast ==
- Charlie Schlatter as David Watson/Jack Watson
- George Burns as Jack Watson/David Watson
- Tony Roberts as Arnold 'Arnie' Watson
- Miriam Flynn as Betty Watson
- Red Buttons as Charlie
- Anita Morris as Madeline
- Pauly Shore as Barrett
- Jennifer Runyon as Robin Morrison
- George DiCenzo as Coach
- Bernard Fox as Horton
- Kenneth Tigar as Professor Swivet
- Anthony Starke as Russ
- Emory Bass as Art Teacher
- Joshua Devane as J.P.
- Benny Baker as Red
- Hal Smith as Irv
- Lance Slaughter as Mikey
- Earl Boen as Robin's Dad
- Toni Sawyer as Robin's Mom
- Stephanie Baldwin as Robin's Sister
- Kimberlin Brown as Receptionist
- Karl Wiedergott as Team Member
- Pat Crawford Brown as Old Lady

== Production ==
The film was announced under the working title of Eighteen Again with George Burns set to star and inspired by Burns' recording of the song I Wish I Was Eighteen Again.

== Reception ==
Roger Ebert gives the film a score of 1 and a half out of 4. He compares it to Like Father Like Son and Vice Versa, calling Vice Versa the best of the three, by far. He stated, "The whole project seems to have been enveloped in a miasma of good intentions and heartwarming sentiments. There’s no edge, no bite and none of the inspired body language that made 'Vice Versa' so special. The movie makes no attempt to really imagine what it would be like to inhabit another body; it just springs the gimmick on us and starts unreeling its sitcom plot. Although Burns is, of course, a beloved institution, and any opportunity to see him is welcome, he is not given much to do in the movie, and he doesn’t do much with it...No real effort has been made to find any differences between Burns and the character he plays in this movie."

Janet Maslin was critical of the film for leaving George Burns in a coma when he is who the audience came to see, and says that it "isn't successfully aimed at anyone in particular".

18 Again! holds a 29% rating on Rotten Tomatoes based on 7 reviews. Metacritic, which uses a weighted average, assigned the film a score of 32 out of 100, based on 10 critics, indicating "generally unfavorable" reviews.
