= Gracie Allen =

American actress (1895–1964)

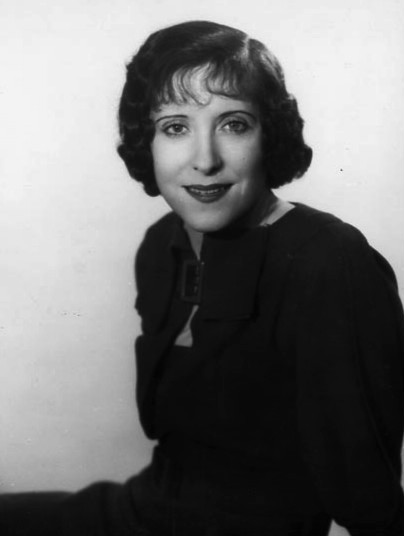
- Publicity still of Allen from the Burns and Allen CBS Radio program (1936)
- Born: Grace Ethel Cecile Rosalie Allen; July 26, 1895; San Francisco, California, U.S.
- Died: August 27, 1964 (aged 69); Los Angeles, California, U.S.
- Resting place: Forest Lawn Memorial Park, Glendale
- Occupations: Actress; comedian; vaudevillian; singer
- Years active: 1924–1958
- Spouse: George Burns (m. 1926)
- Children: 2, including Ronnie Burns
- Awards: Hollywood Walk of Fame; Television Hall of Fame

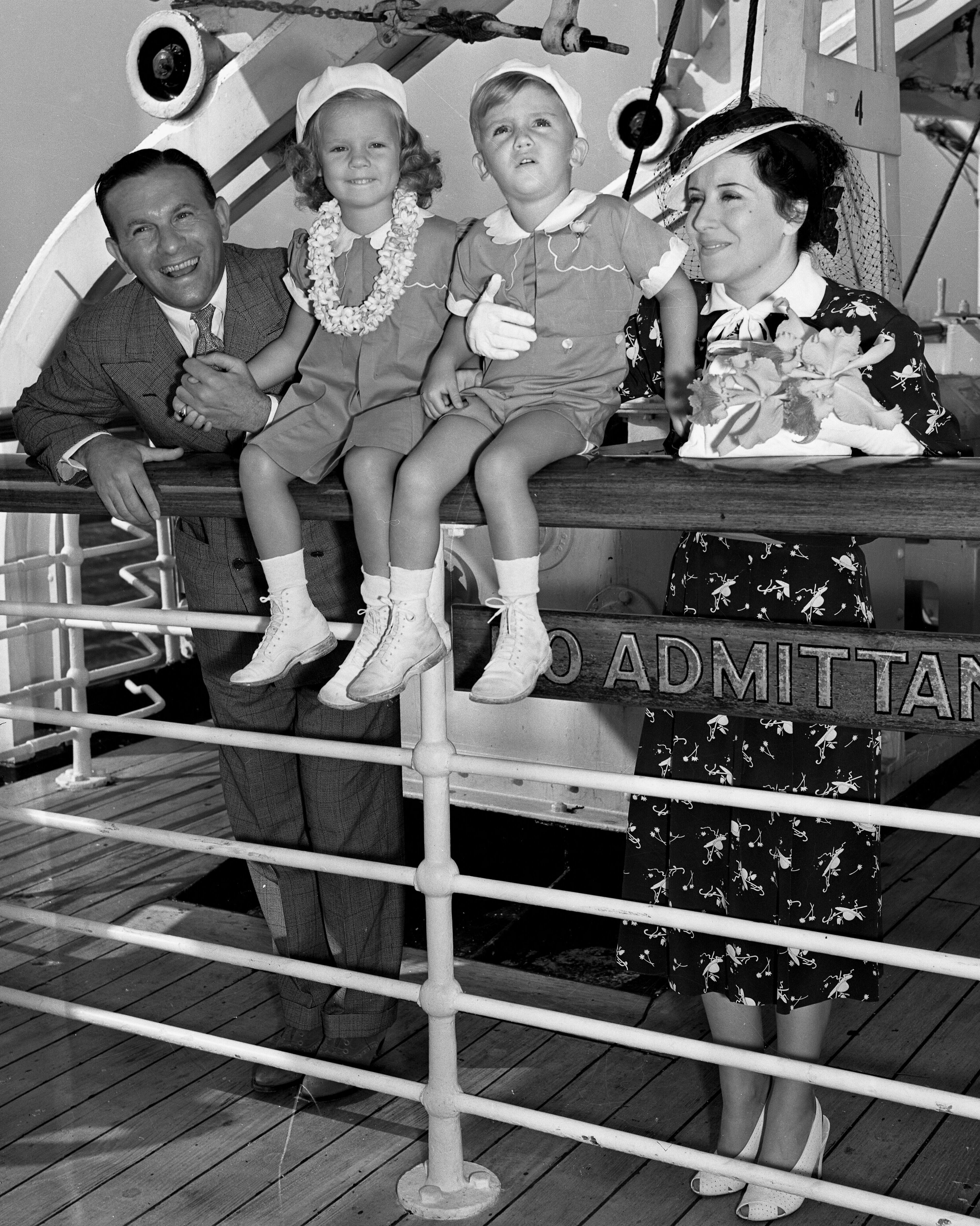
Gracie Allen, George Burns and children aboard Matson flagship Lurline just before they sailed for Hawaii, 1938

Grace Ethel Cecile Rosalie Allen (July 26, 1895 – August 27, 1964) was an American vaudevillian, singer, actress, and comedian who became famous as the zany partner and comic foil of husband George Burns, her straight man, appearing with him on radio, television and film as the duo Burns and Allen.

For her contributions to the television industry, Allen was honored with a star on the Hollywood Walk of Fame at 6672 Hollywood Boulevard. She and Burns were inducted into the Television Hall of Fame in 1988.

Costar Bea Benaderet said of Allen in 1966, "She was probably one of the greatest actresses of our time."

== Early life ==
Allen was born in San Francisco to Margaret Theresa ("Molly") Allen (née Darragh; later Mrs. Edward Pidgeon) and George Allen, who were both of Irish Catholic descent. She made her first appearance on stage at age three, and was given her first radio role by Eddie Cantor. She graduated from Star of the Sea Convent School for Girls in 1914; during that time became a talented dancer.

"George Allen was a song and dance man who abandoned his family when Gracie was about five years old. Her mother later married Edward Pidgeon, a police captain."

She soon began performing Irish folk dances with her three sisters, who were billed as "The Four Colleens". In 1909, Allen joined her sister, Bessie, as a vaudeville performer. At a performance in 1922, Allen met George Burns, and the two formed a comedy act. They were married on January 7, 1926 in Cleveland by a justice of the peace.

Allen was born with heterochromia, which gave her one blue eye and one green eye. Her left arm and shoulder were badly scarred when a pot of boiling tea fell on her as a child; as a result, she wore long-sleeved dresses throughout her life. She also suffered from crippling migraine headaches.

=== Birthdate myth ===
Some discrepancy exists as to her date of birth. Depending on the source, Allen is alleged to have been born on July 26 in 1895, 1896, 1902, or 1906. (The Federal Census for San Francisco in July of 1900 lists Grace with both parents and her siblings and gives her age as “4”.). All public vital records held by the city and county of San Francisco were destroyed in the earthquake and great fire of April 1906. Her husband George Burns professed not to know exactly how old she was, though it was presumably he who provided the date of July 26, 1902 that appears on her death record. Allen's crypt marker also shows her year of birth as 1902.

Among Allen's signature jokes was a dialogue in which she would claim that she was born in 1906. Her foil would press her for proof or corroborating information, and she would reply that her birth certificate had been destroyed in the earthquake. Her foil would point out that she was born in July, but that the earthquake was three months earlier in April. Allen would simply smile and reply: "Well, it was an awfully big earthquake."

Presumably the most reliable information comes from U.S. Census data collected on June 1, 1900 that shows Grace Allen, age four (born in July 1895), along with her parents and five siblings. This proves that Allen was born before 1900 and indicates that the birthdate of July 26, 1895 may be correct. Additionally, the yearbook from her senior year of high school has been located; its 1914 date is consistent with her having been born in 1895.

== Double act ==
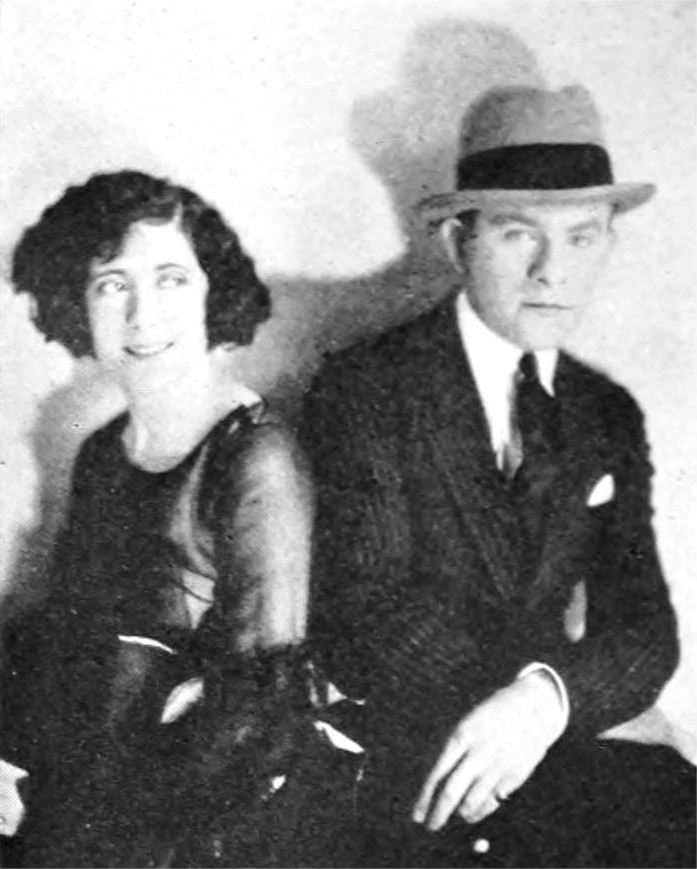
Burns and Allen on the vaudeville circuit in 1924

The Burns and Allen act began with Allen as the straight man, setting up Burns to deliver the punchlines and receive the laughs. In his book Gracie: A Love Story, Burns explained that he had noticed that Allen's straight lines were bringing more laughs than did his punchlines, so he cannily flipped the act, making himself the straight man so that Allen would elicit the laughter. Audiences immediately fell in love with Allen's character, which combined the traits of naivete, zaniness and innocence. The reformulated team, focusing on Allen, toured the country, eventually headlining in major vaudeville houses. Many of their famous routines were preserved in one- and two-reel short films, including Lambchops (1929), made while the couple was still performing on the stage.

Burns attributed all of the couple's early success to Allen, ignoring his own brilliance as a straight man. He summarized their act by saying: "All I had to do was say, 'Gracie, how's your brother?' and she talked for 38 years. And sometimes I didn't even have to remember to say 'Gracie, how's your brother?'"

"The character was simply the dizziest dame in the world, but what made her different from all the other Dumb Doras was that Gracie played her as if she were totally sane, as if her answers actually made sense." - George Burns

== Radio ==
In the early 1930s, like many stars of the era, Burns and Allen graduated to radio. The show was originally a continuation of the flirtation act from their vaudeville and short-film routines. In 1935, famed composer and arranger Ferde Grofe joined them as musical director. Burns realized that they were too old for that type of material and changed the show's format in the fall of 1941 into the situation comedy for which they are best remembered: a working show business married couple negotiating ordinary problems caused by Gracie's "illogical logic", usually with the help of neighbors Harry and Blanche Morton and their announcer Bill Goodwin (later replaced by Harry von Zell during the run of their television series).

== Publicity stunts ==
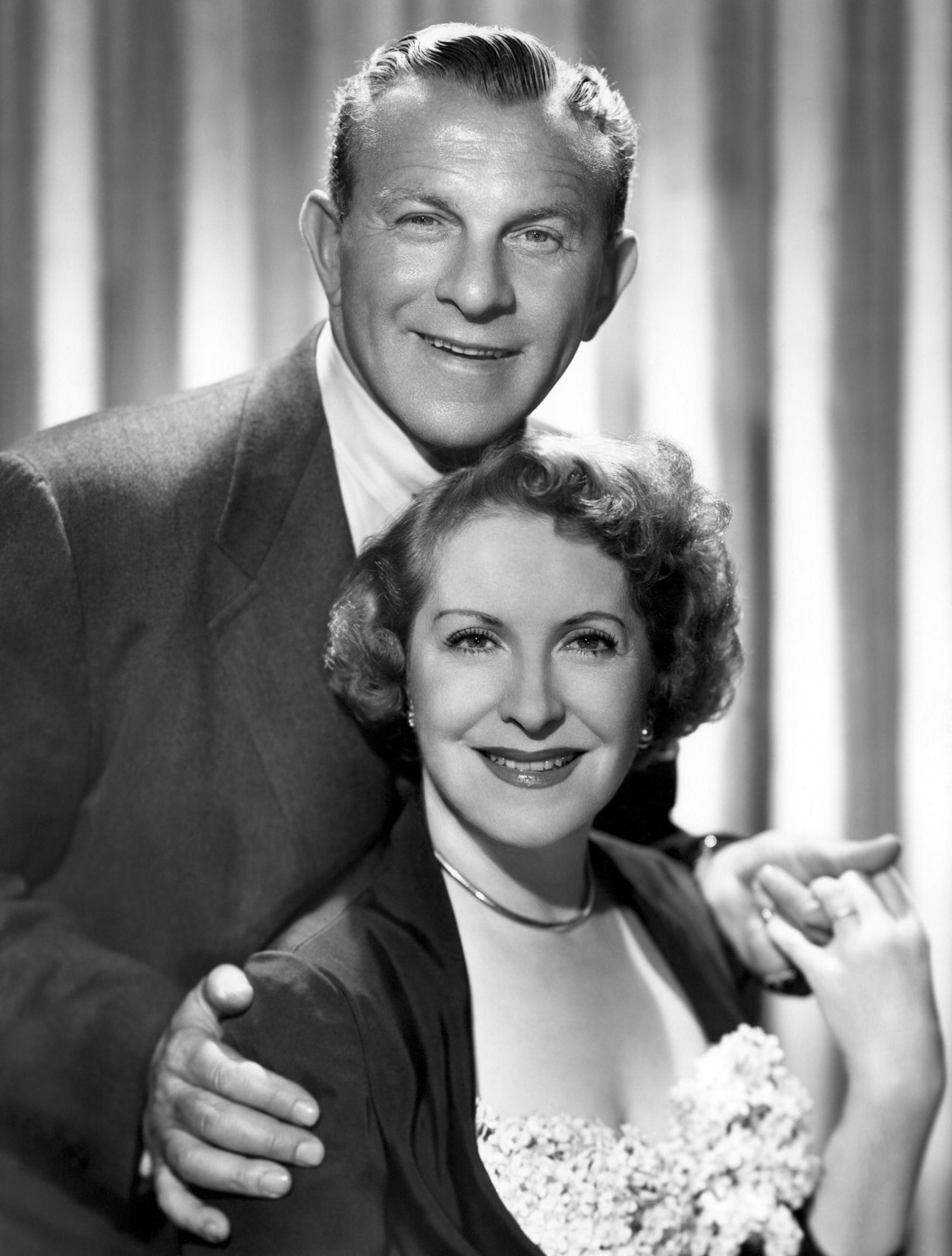
Burns and Allen in 1952

Burns and Allen frequently used running gags as publicity stunts. During 1932–33, they pulled off one of the most successful in the business: a year-long search for Allen's supposedly missing brother. Allen would make unannounced cameo appearances on other shows, asking if anyone had seen her brother. However, her brother did not find it comical and eventually asked them to stop; he was so irked by the gag that he disappeared from society at the height of its popularity.

In 1940, Allen announced that she was running for president of the United States on the Surprise Party ticket. Burns and Allen embarked on a cross-country whistle-stop campaign tour on a private train, performing their live radio show in various cities. In one of her campaign speeches, Gracie said, "I don't know much about the Lend-Lease Bill, but if we owe it, we should pay it." Another typical quip on the campaign trail was: "Everybody knows a woman is better than a man when it comes to introducing bills into the house." The Surprise Party mascot was the kangaroo, and its motto was "It's in the bag." As part of the gag, Duell, Sloan and Pearce published a book, How to Become President by Gracie Allen (in reality, written by Burns and Allen writer Charles Lofgren) that included photographs from their nationwide campaign tour and the Surprise Party convention. Allen received an endorsement from students at Harvard University.

Allen was also the subject of one of S. S. Van Dine's Philo Vance mystery novels, The Gracie Allen Murder Case. Allen said: "S.S. Van Dine is silly to spend six months writing a novel when you can buy one for $2.95."

In another publicity stunt, Allen played a piano concert at the Hollywood Bowl (and later at Carnegie Hall). The Burns and Allen staff hired a composer to write the "Concerto for Index Finger", a joke piece in which the orchestra would play madly, only to pause while Allen played a one-finger scale with a final incorrect note. The orchestra would then play a musical piece that developed around the wrong note. On her final solo, Allen would finally hit the right note, causing the entire orchestra to applaud. The actual index-finger playing was performed offstage by a professional pianist. The concerto was featured in the film Two Girls and a Sailor (1944) with an orchestra conducted by Albert Coates.

== Films ==
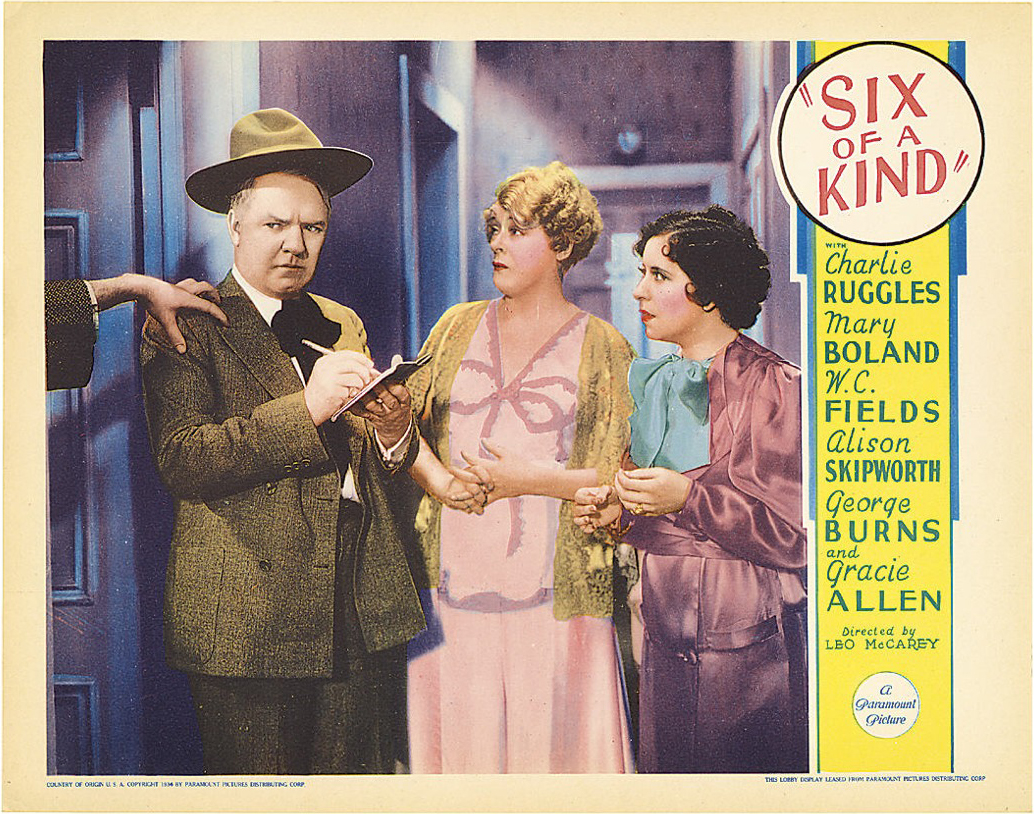
Six of a Kind lobby card with W.C. Fields, Mary Boland and Allen, 1934

In the early 1930s, Burns and Allen appeared in several short films in which they performed some of their classic vaudeville routines. They also appeared in two full-length movies with W. C. Fields: International House (1933) and Six of a Kind (1934). Burns and Allen also appeared in three out of the four Big Broadcast ensemble comedies including The Big Broadcast (1932) with Bing Crosby, The Big Broadcast of 1936 (1935) with Crosby, and The Big Broadcast of 1937 (1936) with Jack Benny. They were also in We're Not Dressing (1934), billed directly under Crosby and Carole Lombard.

In 1937, Burns and Allen starred with Fred Astaire in A Damsel in Distress, a musical with an original score by George Gershwin that introduced the song "A Foggy Day". It was Astaire's first RKO film without dancing partner Ginger Rogers. Astaire's costar Joan Fontaine was not a dancer, and he was reluctant to dance on screen alone. He also felt the script needed more comic relief to enhance the overall appeal of the film. Burns and Allen had each worked in vaudeville as dancers before forming their act, and when word of the project reached them, they called Astaire and he asked them to audition. Burns contacted an act whom he had once seen performing a dance using small whisk brooms. For the next several weeks, he and Allen practiced the complicated routine for their audition. When they presented the dance to Astaire, he liked it so much that he asked them to teach it to him, and it was added to the film with the three of them dancing together. Burns and Allen also matched Astaire step-by-step in the film's demandingly epic dance sequence in a funhouse including amazing visuals with distorted mirrors.

Their next film the following year was College Swing (1938) starring Burns and Allen top-billed above Martha Raye and Bob Hope with a stellar supporting cast featuring Edward Everett Horton, Betty Grable, Jackie Coogan, John Payne, Robert Cummings, and Jerry Colonna. The picture was directed by Raoul Walsh.

A lively musical comedy came next titled Honolulu (1939) starring Eleanor Powell, Robert Young and Burns and Allen billed above the title. Unusually, Burns and Allen performed separately through most of the film until the end, with Allen singing and dancing the energetic titular song with Powell at one point while Burns is off-screen.

That same year, Allen's popularity was such that S.S. Van Dine wrote one of his Philo Vance detective novels featuring her as the principal character titled The Gracie Allen Murder Case. The zanily comedic book was adapted into a film, also titled The Gracie Allen Murder Case (1939). Allen was billed above Warren William (the actor then portraying Philo Vance in the series of Vance films), and without Burns. The result was so successful that Allen was cast two years later in a similar mystery/comedy film titled Mr. and Mrs. North (1942) in which she is top-billed as a comedic detective, again without Burns in the cast.

Allen made her last film appearance in a musical cameo as an amusing concert pianist in Two Girls and a Sailor, without Burns, but remained in radio and would segue into series television with her husband six years later.

== Television ==
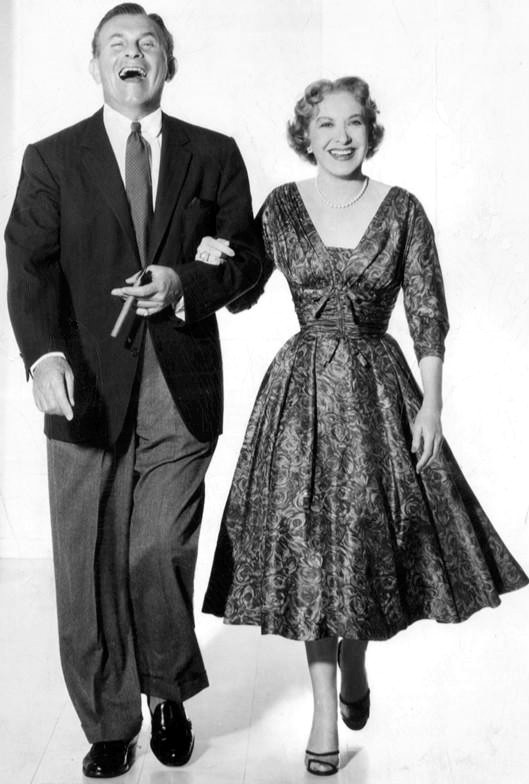
George Burns and Gracie Allen in 1955

In the fall of 1949, having apparently put their movie career behind them but working continuously in radio, Burns and Allen became part of the CBS talent raid. Their good friend and frequent guest star Jack Benny had already departed NBC for CBS, and CBS head William S. Paley made it clear that he believed that talent, not the network, made the difference, which was not the case at NBC. Benny convinced Burns and Allen (among others) to join him in the move to CBS. The Burns and Allen radio show became part of the CBS lineup, and a year later, they also brought their show to television as The George Burns and Gracie Allen Show. They continued to use the formula that had kept them longtime radio stars, playing themselves only now as television stars, still living next door to Harry and Blanche Morton. They concluded each show with a brief dialogue performance in the style of their classic vaudeville and earlier radio routines. Burns always ended the show with variations on "Say goodnight, Gracie", to which Allen simply replied, "Goodnight" (Allen never said, "Goodnight, Gracie", as legend has it).

Allen retired in 1958, and Burns tried to continue without her. The show was renamed The George Burns Show with the cast intact except for Allen. The show's setting was changed from the Burns home to his office, with Blanche working as Burns' secretary so that she could help Allen keep an eye on him. "The show had everything it needed to be successful except Gracie," recalled Burns. "The audience was so used to seeing this cast working with Gracie that everybody kept waiting for her to open the door and walk in. The television critics reviewed Gracie's absence more than the show itself." The show was canceled after one season.

== Private life ==
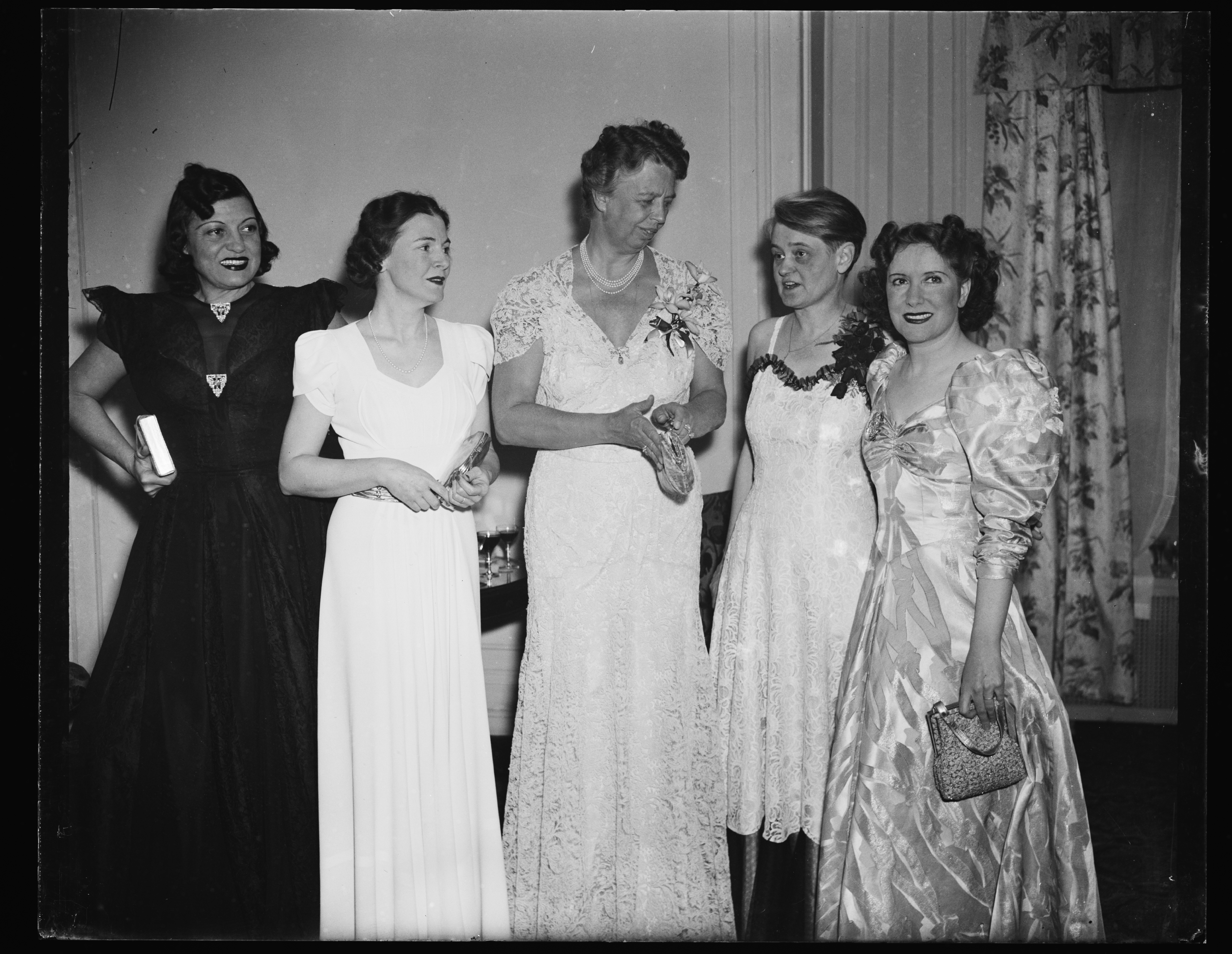
Eleanor Roosevelt (center) and Gracie Allen (right) in 1940

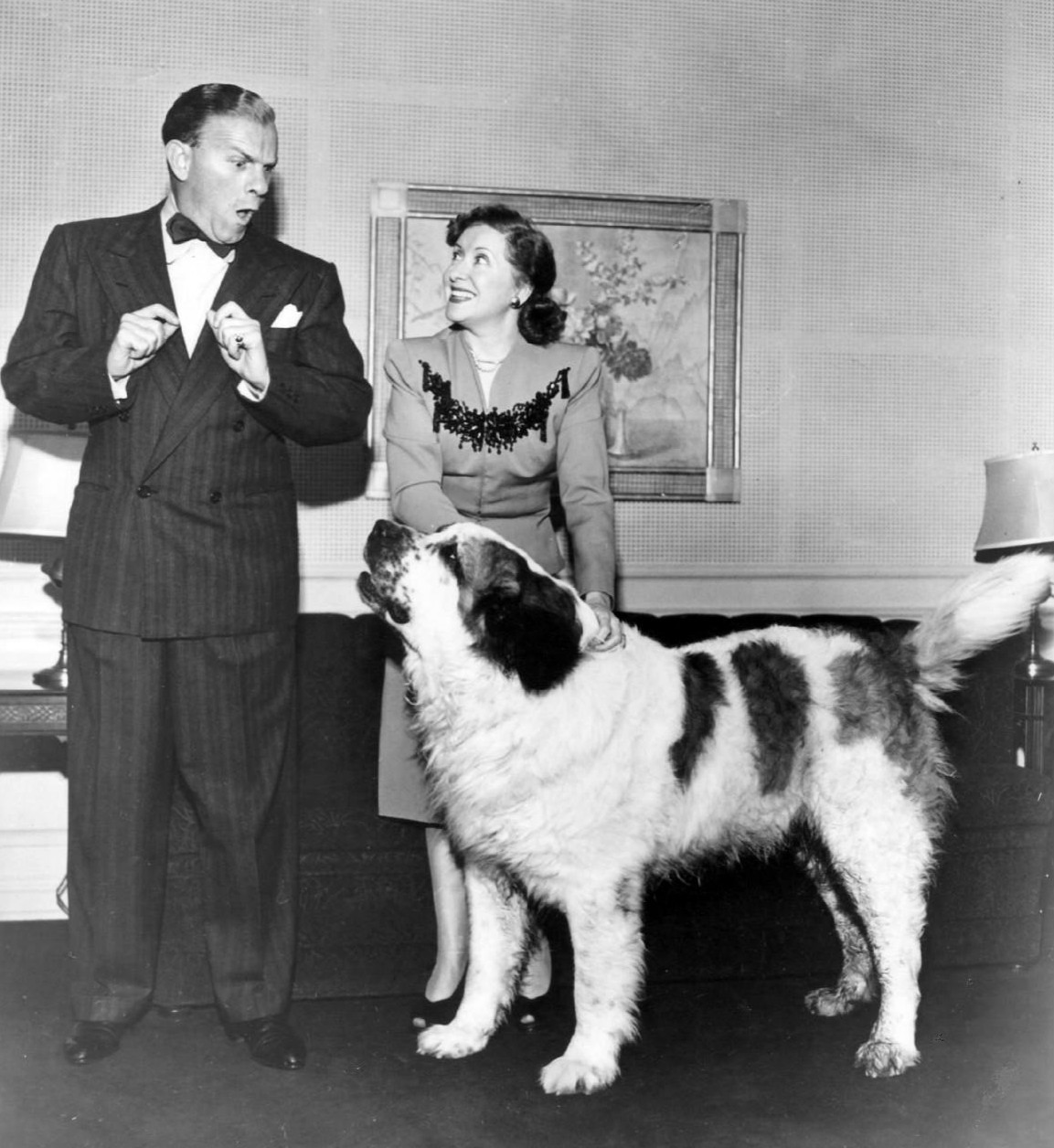
Burns and Allen ca. 1946

In the 1930s, Burns and Allen adopted two children, Sandra Jean and Ronald Jon.

Eight years before his death, Burns publicly admitted that once in their marriage, in the 1950s, he cheated on Allen. In guilt over the one-night affair, Burns gave Allen a $10,000 diamond ring and a $750 silver centerpiece. Allen learned about the affair from her maid -- who overheard a telephone conversation between Burns and Jack Benny. Allen never let on to Burns that she knew, and the couple never discussed it.

=== Death ===
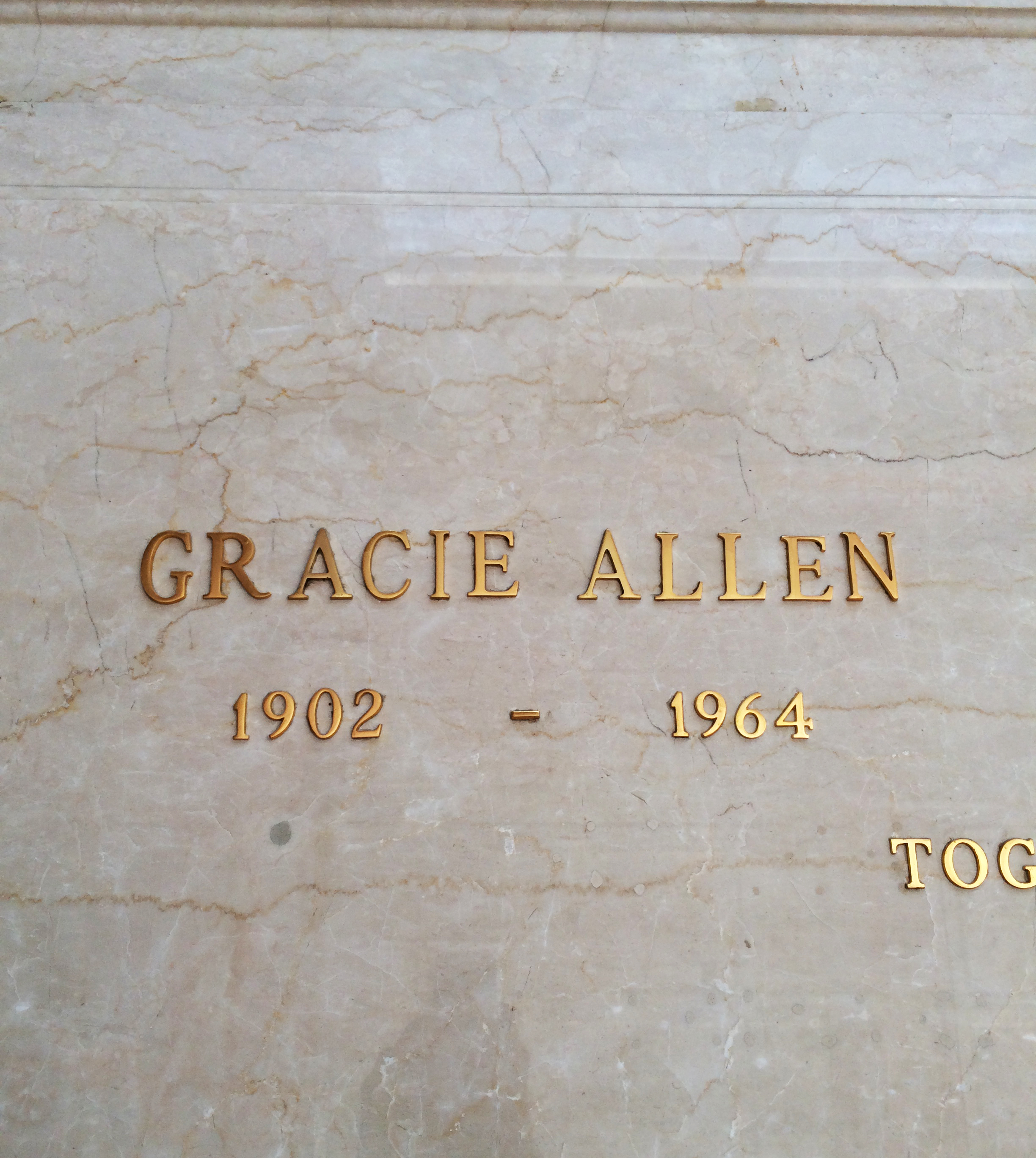
Crypt (with wrong year of birth) at Forest Lawn in Glendale, California

Allen, who had a history of heart disease, died from a heart attack in Hollywood on August 27, 1964, aged 69. Her remains were entombed in a crypt at the Freedom Mausoleum in the Sanctuary of Heritage at Forest Lawn Memorial Park.

Burns' remains were interred at her side in 1996 when he died at the age of 100. The marker on the crypt was changed from "Grace Allen Burns—Beloved Wife And Mother (1902–1964)" to "Gracie Allen (1902–1964) and George Burns (1896–1996)—Together Again".

== Filmography ==
- Lambchops (1929; short) as Gracie the Girlfriend
- The Big Broadcast (1932; first feature film) as Gracie
- International House (1933) as Nurse Allen
- College Humor (1933) as Herself
- Six of a Kind (1934) as Gracie Devore
- We're Not Dressing (1934) as Gracie
- Many Happy Returns (1934, first leading role) as Herself
- Love in Bloom (1935) as Gracie Downey
- Here Comes Cookie (1935) as Herself
- The Big Broadcast of 1936 (1935) as Herself
- The Big Broadcast of 1937 (1936) as Mrs. Platt
- College Holiday (1936) as Calliope "Gracie" Dove
- A Damsel in Distress (1937) as Gracie
- College Swing (1938) as Gracie Alden
- Honolulu (1939) as Millie De Grasse
- The Gracie Allen Murder Case (1939; without George Burns – a "Philo Vance" mystery by S. S. Van Dine) as Herself
- Mr. and Mrs. North (1941; second murder mystery film without Burns) as Pamela North
- Two Girls and a Sailor (1944, guest appearance without Burns; last movie role) as Herself

== Radio series ==
- The Robert Burns Panatella Show: 1932–1933, CBS
- The White Owl Program: 1933–1934, CBS
- The Adventures of Gracie: 1934–1935, CBS
- The Campbell's Tomato Juice Program: 1935–1937, CBS
- The Grape Nuts Program: 1937–1938, NBC
- The Chesterfield Program: 1938–1939, CBS
- The Hinds Honey and Almond Cream Program: 1939–1940, CBS
- The Hormel Program: 1940–1941, NBC
- The Swan Soap Show: 1941–1945, NBC, CBS
- Maxwell House Coffee Time: 1945–1949, NBC
- The Amm-i-Dent Toothpaste Show: 1949–1950, CBS

== Gracie Award ==
The Gracie Award is presented by the Alliance for Women in Media to recognize exemplary programming created by women, for women and about women in radio, television, cable and web-based media, including news, drama, comedy, commercials, public service, documentary and sports. The awards program encourages the realistic and multifaceted portrayal of women in entertainment, news, features and other programs. Allen has twice been nominated to the National Women's Hall of Fame, though she has not been inducted. She has been honored by James L. Brooks, who named Gracie Films after her.

== See also ==
- The George Burns and Gracie Allen Show, 1950–58, CBS
- ZaSu Pitts, a dizzy dame comedic actress
