= I Wish I Was Eighteen Again =

1979 song

"I Wish I Was Eighteen Again" is a song written by Sonny Throckmorton in 1979.

== Jerry Lee Lewis version ==
"I Wish I Was Eighteen Again"

Single by Jerry Lee Lewis

from the album Jerry Lee Lewis
- A-side: "Rockin' My Life Away"
- Released: March 1979
- Recorded: early January 1979
- Studio: Filmways/Heider Recording, Hollywood, California
- Genre: Country
- Length: 3:40
- Label: Elektra E-46030
- Songwriter: Sonny Throckmorton
- Producer: Bones Howe

Jerry Lee Lewis originally recorded the song for his self-titled album in 1979. It was released as the B-side of "Rockin' My Life Away". The song was a top-20 hit on the Billboard Country chart, peaking at number 18.

=== Chart performance ===
Chart (1979)	Peak position
US Billboard Hot Country Singles	18

== George Burns version ==
"I Wish I Was Eighteen Again"

Single by George Burns

from the album I Wish I Was Eighteen Again
- B-side: "One Of The Mysteries Of Life"
- Released: December 1979
- Recorded: October 31, 1979
- Studio: Sound Stage Studios; Nashville, Tennessee
- Genre: Country
- Length: 3:22
- Label: Mercury 57011
- Songwriter: Sonny Throckmorton
- Producer: Jerry Kennedy

George Burns singles chronology
"I Wish I Was Eighteen Again" (1979)	"The Arizona Whiz" (1980)

A year later, comedian-actor George Burns covered the song for his 1980 album of the same title. The song was also featured in the 1988 film 18 Again!, in which Burns starred. Burns' cover slightly missed the top 40 on the Billboard Hot 100, peaking at number 49. However, it was a top-40 hit on the Easy Listening and Country charts. Despite being his only entry to both charts, it did better than Lewis' version in the Country chart, peaking at number 15.

=== Chart performance ===
Chart (1980)	Peak position
US Billboard Hot 100	49
US Billboard Adult Contemporary	25
US Billboard Hot Country Singles	15
Canada RPM Top 100	25
Canada RPM Adult Contemporary	19
Canada RPM Country	8
