= Lambchops (film) =

1929 film

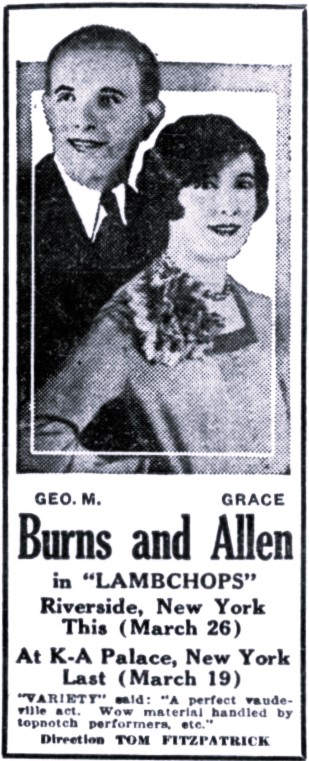
- 1928 advertisement for the vaudeville routine
- Directed by: Murray Roth (uncredited)
- Written by: Al Boasberg (uncredited); George Burns (uncredited)
- Starring: Burns & Allen
- Production companies: Vitaphone Varieties #891; Presented by Vitaphone; A subsidiary of Warner Brothers Pictures, Inc
- Distributed by: Warner Brothers
- Release date: October 1929
- Running time: 8 minutes
- Country: United States
- Language: English

Lambchops is an 8-minute American comedy Vitaphone short subject released in October 1929, which depicts a vaudeville performance by Burns and Allen of the comedy routine "Lambchops" written by Al Boasberg. The work's copyright was renewed in 1957, and it entered the American public domain on January 1, 2025. (Note: Under R196869)

== Plot ==
Lambchops (1929)

George Burns and Gracie Allen perform a short comedy routine including singing and dancing.

== Cast ==
- George Burns as George the Boyfriend (as Burns)
- Gracie Allen as Gracie the Girlfriend (as Allen)

== Production ==
The night that they arrived in New York after their first tour of England with their vaudeville routines, George Burns and Gracie Allen attended a party where they were approached by their agent Arthur Lyons, who asked if they would be interested in filming a short for Warner Brothers the following morning. Comedian Fred Allen was slated to film one of his comedy routines but had come down with the flu, leaving the studio in the lurch. Burns was told that the job paid $1,700, so he said yes on the spot. "I'd never heard of $1,700 in my life, especially for nine minutes' work," Burns quipped.

When they arrived on the set of the Vitaphone studio in Brooklyn the next morning, Burns was shocked to see his childhood buddy Murray Roth, who was directing. Burns did not believe Roth was in showbiz, let alone a film director, so Roth shouted "Lights!" and the set lights come on. "Off!" he shouted, and the stage went black. This glimpse of the living room set that they'd be shooting on perplexed Burns due to his familiarity with theatre and street performance. His toupée was still in his luggage, which he had not had time to pick up from the loading dock following their trip. To explain why he was wearing a hat, he quickly rewrote the comedy duo's "Lambchops" routine to begin with himself and Gracie coming into the room and looking for the audience.

== Reception ==
According to George Burns, Warner Bros. was not impressed with the short, which he himself described as, "not the greatest", so they were not asked to shoot any more for the studio. Burns, however was so enamored by the paycheck that he actively sought out more film work and was quickly embraced by Paramount Pictures, with whom Burns and Allen subsequently released a whole series of short subjects.

In 1999 Lambchops was selected for preservation in the United States National Film Registry by the Library of Congress as being "culturally, historically, or aesthetically significant."

== Home media ==
Lambchops was released on DVD in October 2007, on disc three of a three-disc 80th anniversary edition of The Jazz Singer.

- 2007: The Jazz Singer, Three-Disc Deluxe Edition. Burbank, California: Warner Home Video. ISBN 9781419856228
