= Murray Roth =

American film director

Murray Roth (November 2, 1893 - 1938) was a writer and director of films in the United States. Roth was the writer for film producer and director Bryan Foy, and by the late 1920s began directing shorts in Brooklyn such as Lamchops. He directed several short films for Vitaphone before moving to features including his first in 1933, Don't Bet on Love. Roth also wrote the lyrics to George Gershwin's first published song, "When You Want 'Em, You Can't Get 'Em" .

== Filmography ==
- Vitaphone Varieties (1927), author of some of the stories
- Lights of New York , co-writer with comedian Hugh Herbert
- Lambchops (1929), director (uncredited)
- Yamekraw (1930), director (short film)
- Don't Bet on Love (1933), director and co-writer
- Palooka (1934), co-author of adaptation
- Million Dollar Ransom (1934), director
- Harold Teen (1934), director
- Chinatown Squad (1935), director
- Flying Hostess (1936), director
- Ripley's Believe It or Not!, director of first five shorts
- Pepper (1936), writer with Jefferson Parker and Lamar Trotti
- She's Dangerous (1937), original story

== Discography ==
- "My Runaway Girl", lyrics
