= I Wish I Was Eighteen Again (album) =

Studio album by George Burns
- Released: 1980
- Recorded: 1979
- Studios: Sound Stage Studios; The Village Recorder
- Genre: Country
- Label: Mercury
- Producer: Jerry Kennedy

George Burns chronology
I Wish I Was Eighteen Again (1980)	George Burns In Nashville (1980)

Singles from John Hall
- 1. "I Wish I Was Eighteen Again" Released: 1980; 2. "The Arizona Whiz" Released: 1980

Professional ratings
Review scores
Source	Rating
AllMusic	3.5/5 stars

I Wish I Was Eighteen Again is the debut album by George Burns, released in 1980.

The album peaked at No. 93 on Billboards Top LPs & Tape chart. The title track is Burns' only Billboard Hot 100 and Adult Contemporary entry.

== Track listing ==
Side A
No.	Title	Writer(s)	Length
1.	"The Arizona Whiz"	Sanders, Barnes	2:30
2.	"Old Bones"	Hadley	3:01
3.	"The Baby Song"	White	2:11
4.	"The Only Way To Go"	Hamlisch, Rice	2:34
5.	"Forgive Her A Little (And Love Her A Lot)"	B. Zerface, J. Zerface, Morrison	2:38

Side B
No.	Title	Writer(s)	Length
6.	"I Wish I Was Eighteen Again"	Throckmorton	3:22
7.	"Old Dogs, Children And Watermelon Wine"	Hall	3:49
8.	"A Real Good Cigar"	Sutton	2:21
9.	"One Of The Mysteries Of Life"	Hall	2:58
10.	"Nickels And Dimes"	Parton, Estel	3:14

== Personnel ==
Production

- Producer: Jerry Kennedy
- Engineers: Brent King, Carla Frederick, Mike Psanos
- Photography: Gary Heery

== Charts ==
Album

Chart (1980)	Peak position
US Billboard Top LPs & Tape	93
US Billboard Top Country LPs	12

Singles

Year	Single	Chart	Position
1980	"I Wish I Was Eighteen Again"	Billboard Hot 100	49
1980	"I Wish I Was Eighteen Again"	Billboard Adult Contemporary	25
1980	"I Wish I Was Eighteen Again"	Billboard Hot Country Singles	15
1980	"The Arizona Whiz"	Billboard Hot Country Singles	85
