= George Burns =

American entertainer (1896–1996)

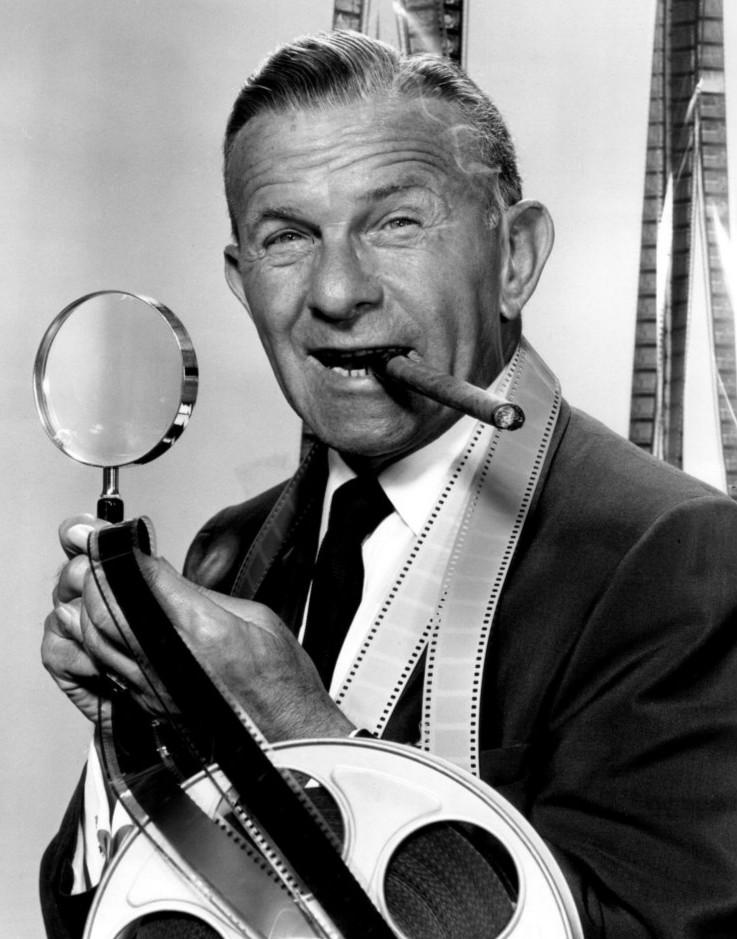
- Burns in 1961
- Born: Nathan Birnbaum; January 20, 1896; New York City, U.S.
- Died: March 9, 1996 (aged 100); Beverly Hills, California, U.S.
- Resting place: Forest Lawn Memorial Park, Glendale
- Occupations: Actor; comedian; writer; singer; television host
- Years active: 1902–1996
- Spouse: Gracie Allen (m. 1926; died 1964)
- Children: 2, including Ronnie
- Parent(s): Louis "Lipa" Birnbaum and Hadassah "Dora" Birnbaum (née Bluth)
- Awards: Hollywood Walk of Fame; Television Hall of Fame; Academy Award for Best Supporting Actor

George Burns (born Nathan Birnbaum; January 20, 1896 – March 9, 1996) was an American comedian, actor, writer, and singer, and one of the few entertainers whose career successfully spanned vaudeville, radio, film, and television. His arched eyebrow and cigar-smoke punctuation became familiar trademarks. He and his wife Gracie Allen appeared on radio, television and film as the comedy duo Burns and Allen.

At age 79, Burns experienced a sudden career revival as an amiable, beloved, and unusually active comedy elder statesman in the 1975 film The Sunshine Boys, for which he won the Academy Award for Best Supporting Actor.

== Early life ==
George Burns was born Nathan Birnbaum (Hebrew: נתן בירנבוים) on January 20, 1896, in New York City, the ninth of 12 children born to Hadassah "Dorah" (née Bluth; Hebrew: הדסה בלוט בירנבוים; 1857–1927) and Eliezer Birnbaum (Hebrew: אליעזר בירנבוים; 1855–1903), known as Louis or Lippa, Jewish immigrants who had come to the United States from Ropczyce, Galicia, now Poland. Burns was a member of the First Roumanian-American Congregation.

His father was a substitute cantor at the local synagogue but usually worked as a coat presser. During the influenza epidemic of 1903, Lippe Birnbaum contracted the flu and died at the age of 47. Burns, called Nattie or Nate at the time, went to work to help support the family, shining shoes, running errands and selling newspapers.

When he got a job as a syrup maker in a local candy shop at age seven, Burns was "discovered", as he later recalled:

We were all about the same age, six and seven, and when we were bored making syrup, we used to practice singing harmony in the basement. One day our letter carrier came down to the basement. His name was Lou Farley. Feingold was his real name, but he changed it to Farley. He wanted the whole world to sing harmony. He came down to the basement once to deliver a letter and heard the four of us kids singing harmony. He liked our style, so we sang a couple more songs for him. Then we looked up at the head of the stairs and saw three or four people listening to us and smiling. In fact, they threw down a couple of pennies. So I said to the kids I was working with: no more chocolate syrup. It's show business from now on.

We called ourselves the Pee-Wee Quartet. We started out singing on ferryboats, in saloons, in brothels, and on street corners. We'd put our hats down for donations. Sometimes the customers threw something in the hats. Sometimes they took something out of the hats. Sometimes they took the hats.

One of the Burns brothers' first regular gigs was operating the curtains at the vaudeville and nickelodeon theatre of Frank Seiden, father of Joseph Seiden, who later became a Yiddish film producer. Burns started smoking cigars when he was 14.

Burns was drafted into the United States Army when the U.S. entered World War I in 1917, but failed the physical examination because he was extremely nearsighted. To hide his Jewish heritage, he adopted the stage name by which he would be known for the rest of his life. He later claimed that he selected the name George Burns because there were two active star professional baseball players with the name (George H. Burns and George J. Burns, unrelated), each of whom accumulated more than 2,000 hits and held some major-league records. Burns also was reported to have taken "George" from his brother Izzy (who had first adopted the name because he hated his own) and "Burns" from the Burns Brothers Coal Company, from whose trucks he stole coal as a youth.

His first wife was Hannah Siegel (stage name Hermosa Jose), one of his dance partners. The marriage lasted 26 weeks and occurred only because Siegel's family would not permit her to tour with Burns unless they were married. They divorced at the end of the tour.

Burns normally partnered with a woman, sometimes in an adagio dance routine, sometimes in comic patter. Though he had an apparent flair for comedy, he never quite clicked with any of his partners until he met Gracie Allen, a young Irish Catholic woman, in 1923. "All of a sudden", he later said, "the audience realized I had a talent. They were right. I did have a talent—and I was married to her for 38 years." Burns wed Allen in 1926.

== Stage to screen ==
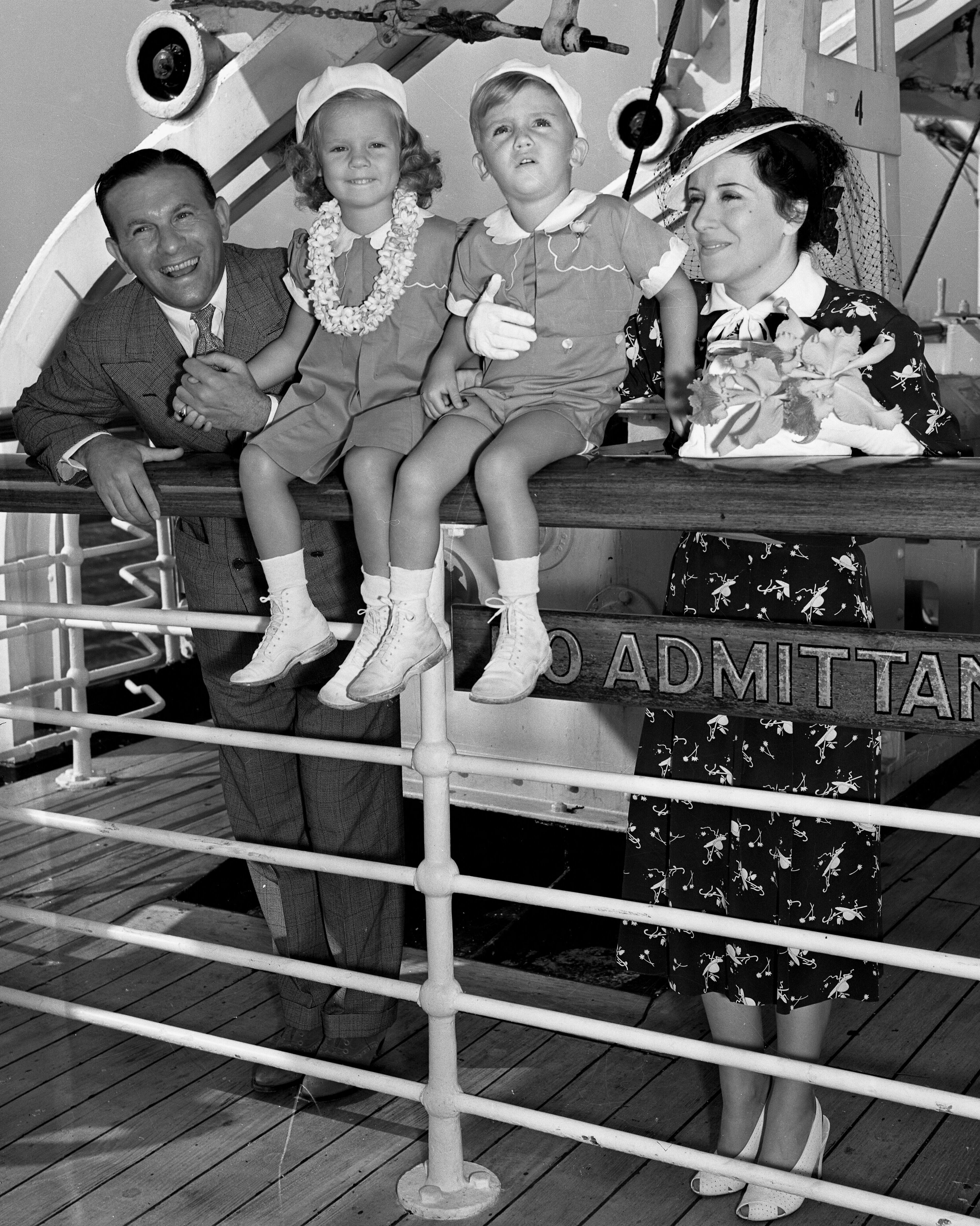
Burns, Allen and children just before sailing for Hawaii in 1938

As a stage act the pair, billed as "Geo. N. Burns and Miss Grace Allen" appeared at the London Palladium during the week of 25 March 1929, performing a sketch by A.L. Boasberg titled "Lamb Chops".

Burns and Allen began their career in motion pictures with a series of comic short films in the late 1920s and early 1930s, such as The Big Broadcast (1932) with Bing Crosby, International House (1933) and Six of a Kind (1934) with W. C. Fields, The Big Broadcast of 1936 with Crosby again, The Big Broadcast of 1937 with Jack Benny, A Damsel in Distress (1937) with Fred Astaire and Joan Fontaine, and College Swing (1938) with Bob Hope and Martha Raye. Honolulu (1939) with Eleanor Powell and Robert Young was Burns's last film for nearly 40 years, though Allen starred in two more pictures without him.

In 1938, Paramount producer and managing director William LeBaron was planning a vehicle for Burns and Allen to team with established star Bing Crosby, with a script written by Don Hartman and Frank Butler. But the story didn't fit Burns and Allen's style, so LeBaron ordered rewrites to fit two male co-stars: Crosby and Bob Hope. The project became Road to Singapore (1940), the first in a long-running and popular series of "Road" films.

== Radio stars ==
Burns and Allen first appeared on the radio as the comedy relief for bandleader Guy Lombardo. In his memoir The Third Time Around, Burns shared a letter from a college fraternity complaining that its weekly dance parties were interrupted by Burns and Allen routines.

Burns and Allen found their own show and radio audience, first airing on February 15, 1932. Their show was based on their classic stage routines and sketch comedy in which their style was woven into multiple smaller scenes, in a manner similar to that of the short films that they had made in Hollywood. They were also known for clever publicity stunts, such as Allen's hunt for her missing brother that carried over into guest spots on other radio shows. In April 1935 they added Ferde Grofé as musical director.

The couple was portrayed at first as unmarried, with Allen the object of Burns's affections as well as those of other cast members. Bandleaders Ray Noble (known for his phrase "Gracie, this is the first time we've ever been alone") and Artie Shaw played Allen's love interests. Singer Tony Martin also played Allen's unwilling love interest, whom she comically threatened to fire if he did not reciprocate her romantic interest.

With ratings declining and their audience familiar with their real-life marriage, Burns and Allen adapted their radio show in 1941 to present them as a married couple. Artie Shaw, who also appeared as a character in some of the show's sketches, was the show's bandleader at one time. Allen's character also changed slightly during this era, often being mean to Burns.

As this format grew stale over the years, in 1941 Burns and his fellow writers redeveloped the show as a situation comedy. The reformat focused on the couple's married life and their friends and neighbors, including Elvia Allman as Tootsie Sagwell, a man-hungry spinster in love with Bill Goodwin. The characters of Harry and Blanche Morton became a mainstay of the program.

As with The Jack Benny Program, the new George Burns & Gracie Allen Show portrayed Burns and Allen as entertainers with their own weekly radio show. Goodwin remained, and the music was now led by Meredith Willson (later to be better known for composing the Broadway musical The Music Man). Willson also played himself on the show as naïve, friendly and shy with women. The new format's success made it one of the few classic radio comedies to completely reinvent itself and regain great success.

=== Supporting players ===
The supporting cast during this phase included Mel Blanc as the melancholy, ironically named "Happy Postman" (his catchphrase was "Remember, keep smiling!"); Bea Benaderet (later Cousin Pearl in The Beverly Hillbillies, Kate Bradley in Petticoat Junction and the voice of Betty Rubble in The Flintstones) and Hal March (later the host of The $64,000 Question) as neighbors Blanche and Harry Morton; and the various members of Allen's ladies' club, the Beverly Hills Uplift Society. One running gag during this period, stretching into the television era, was Burns's questionable singing voice; Allen lovingly called him "Sugar Throat". The show received and maintained a Top 10 rating for the rest of its radio life.

=== New network ===
In 1949, after 12 years at NBC, the couple took the show back to its original network CBS, where they had risen to fame from 1932 to 1937. Their friend Jack Benny reached a negotiating impasse with NBC over the corporation he set up ("Amusement Enterprises") to package his show, the better to put more of his earnings on a capital-gains basis and avoid the 80% taxes levied on very high earners in the World War II period. CBS executive William S. Paley convinced Benny to move to CBS (Paley, among other things, impressed Benny with his attitude that the performers make the network, not the other way around, as NBC chief David Sarnoff reputedly believed); Benny in turn convinced several NBC stars to join him, including Burns and Allen. Thus, CBS reaped the benefits when Burns and Allen moved to television in 1950.

== Television ==
=== The George Burns and Gracie Allen Show ===
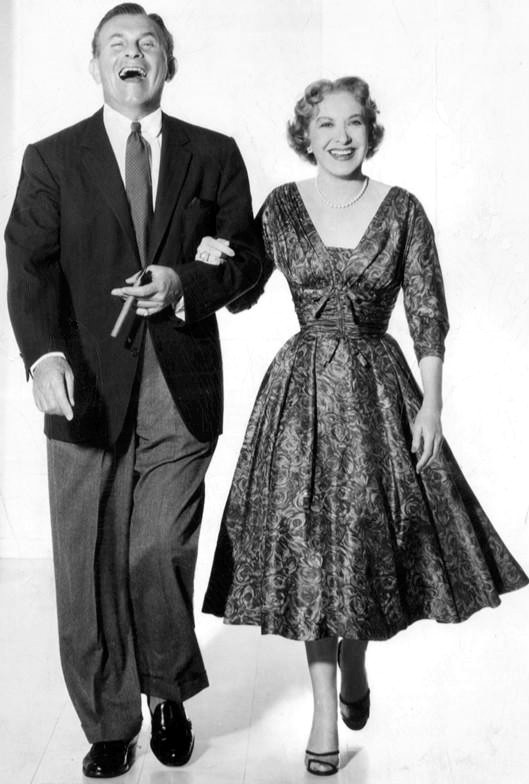
George Burns and Gracie Allen, 1955.

"Major radio stars like Fred Allen, Jack Benny, and Amos 'n' Andy were preparing to make the move [to television], and I wanted to do it too, but I knew Gracie had no intention of competing", Burns remembered. "She was already talking about retiring from show business, and I had to try to talk her into starting a whole new career." He finally persuaded his wife to make one TV test, and if she didn't like it, Burns would never mention the subject again.

Burns prevailed, and The George Burns and Gracie Allen Show made its TV debut on October 12, 1950. There were significant changes from the radio show:

- A succession of actors portrayed Harry Morton: Hal March, The Life of Riley alumnus John Brown, veteran film and television character actor Fred Clark, and future Mister Ed co-star Larry Keating.
- Burns often broke the fourth wall, and chatted with the home audience, telling understated jokes and commenting wryly on what show characters were doing. In later shows, he actually turned on a television and watched what the other characters were up to when he was off camera, then returned to foil them.
- When announcer Bill Goodwin left after the first season, Burns hired announcer Harry Von Zell, a veteran of the Fred Allen and Eddie Cantor radio shows. Von Zell was cast as the good-natured, easily confused Burns and Allen announcer and buddy. He also became one of the show's running gags: his involvement in Allen's harebrained ideas got him fired by Burns as often as not.
- The first shows were simply copied from the radio format, complete with lengthy and integrated commercials for sponsor Carnation Evaporated Milk by Goodwin. But what worked well on radio sometimes appeared forced and plodding on television. The show was changed into the now-standard situation comedy format, with the commercials distinct from the plot.
- Midway through the run of the show, the Burnses' two children, Sandra and Ronald, began to appear, Sandy in an occasional voiceover or brief on-air part (often as a telephone operator) and Ronnie in various small roles during seasons 4 and 5. Ronnie joined the regular cast in season 6. Typical of the blurred line between reality and fiction in the show, Ronnie played George and Gracie's on-air son, showing up in the second episode of season 6 ("Ronnie Arrives") with no explanation offered for where he had been for the past five years. Originally his character was an aspiring dramatic actor who held his parents' comedy style in befuddled contempt and deemed it unsuitable for a "serious" drama student. When the show's characters moved back to California in season 7 after spending the prior year in New York City, Ronnie's character dropped his acting aspirations and enrolled in USC, becoming an inveterate girl chaser.

Burns and Allen also took a cue from Lucille Ball and Desi Arnaz's Desilu Productions and formed a company of their own, McCadden Corporation (named after the street on which Burns's brother lived), headquartered on the General Service Studio lot in the heart of Hollywood, and set up to film television shows and commercials. Besides their own hit show (which transitioned from a biweekly live series to a weekly filmed version in 1952), the couple's company produced such television series as The Bob Cummings Show (later syndicated and rerun as Love That Bob); The People's Choice, starring Jackie Cooper; Mona McCluskey, starring Juliet Prowse; and Mister Ed, starring Alan Young and a talented "talking" horse. Several of Jack Benny's 1953–55 filmed episodes were also produced by McCadden for CBS.

The George Burns and Gracie Allen Show ran until 1958, when Burns at last consented to Allen's retirement. The onset of heart trouble in the early 1950s had left her exhausted from full-time work and she had been anxious to stop, but could not say no to Burns.

=== The George Burns Show ===
Burns attempted to continue the show (for new sponsor Colgate-Palmolive on NBC), with the same writers, production crew, and supporting cast. The series was now titled The George Burns Show. "The show had everything it needed to be successful except Gracie", recalled Burns. "The audience was so used to seeing this cast working with Gracie that everybody kept waiting for her to open the door and walk in. The television critics reviewed Gracie's absence more than the show itself." The show was canceled after one season.

=== Wendy and Me ===
Burns subsequently created Wendy and Me, a sitcom in which he co-starred with Connie Stevens, Ron Harper, and J. Pat O'Malley. He acted primarily as the narrator, and secondarily as the adviser to Stevens's Gracie-like character. The first episode involved the nearly 69-year-old Burns watching his younger neighbor's activities with amusement, just as he had watched the Burns and Allen television show while it was unfolding to get a jump on what Gracie was up to in its final two seasons. Also as in the Burns and Allen television show, Burns frequently broke the fourth wall by talking directly to viewers. The series only lasted a year. In a promotion, Burns had joked that "Connie Stevens plays Wendy, and I play 'me'."

== The Sunshine Boys ==
After Gracie died in 1964, Burns immersed himself in work. McCadden Productions co-produced the television series No Time for Sergeants, based on the hit Broadway play; Burns also produced Juliet Prowse's 1965–66 NBC situation comedy, Mona McCluskey. At the same time, he toured the United States, playing nightclub and theater engagements with such diverse partners as Carol Channing, Dorothy Provine, Jane Russell, Connie Haines, and Beryl Davis. He also performed a series of solo concerts, playing university campuses, New York's Philharmonic Hall and winding up a successful season at Carnegie Hall, where he wowed a capacity audience with his show-stopping songs, dances, and jokes.

In 1974, Burns's close friend Jack Benny signed to play one of the lead roles in the Metro-Goldwyn-Mayer film version of Neil Simon's The Sunshine Boys (Red Skelton was originally the other lead, but he objected to some of the script's language). But Benny's health had begun to fail, and he advised his manager, Irving Fein, to let Burns fill in for him on a series of nightclub dates to which Benny had committed around the U.S.

Burns, who enjoyed working, accepted the job for what would be his first feature film appearance for 36 years. As he recalled years later:

"The happiest people I know are the ones that are still working. The saddest are the ones who are retired. Very few performers retire on their own. It's usually because no one wants them. Six years ago Sinatra announced his retirement. He's still working."—George Burns

Ill health prevented Benny from working on The Sunshine Boys; he died of pancreatic cancer on December 26, 1974. Heartbroken, Burns said that the only time he ever wept in his life other than Allen's death was when Benny died. He was chosen to give one of the eulogies at the funeral and said, "Jack was someone special to all of you, but he was so special to me ... I cannot imagine my life without Jack Benny, and I will miss him so very much." Burns then broke down and had to be helped to his seat. People who knew Burns said he never really came to terms with Benny's death.

Six weeks before filming started, Burns had triple bypass surgery.

Burns replaced Benny in the film as well as the club tour, a move that turned out to be one of the biggest breaks of his career; his wise performance as faded vaudevillian Al Lewis won him the 1975 Academy Award for Best Supporting Actor and permanently secured his career resurgence. At 80, Burns was the oldest Oscar winner in the history of the Academy Awards, a record that stood until Jessica Tandy won an Oscar for Driving Miss Daisy in 1989.

== Oh, God! ==
In 1977, Burns made another hit film, Oh, God!, playing the omnipotent title role opposite singer John Denver as an earnest but befuddled supermarket manager, whom God picks at random to revive his message. The image of Burns in a sailor's cap and light springtime jacket as the droll Almighty influenced his subsequent comedic work, as well as that of other comedians. At a celebrity roast in his honor, Dean Martin adapted a Burns crack: "When George was growing up, the Top 10 were the Ten Commandments".

Burns appeared in this character along with Vanessa Williams on the September 1984 cover of Penthouse magazine, the issue that contained Williams's notorious nude photos, as well as the first appearance of underage pornographic film star Traci Lords. A blurb on the cover announced "Oh God, she's nude!"

Oh, God! inspired two sequels, Oh, God! Book II (in which the Almighty engages a precocious schoolgirl played by Louanne Sirota to spread the word) and Oh, God! You Devil—in which Burns played a dual role as God and the devil, with the soul of a would-be songwriter (played by Ted Wass) at stake.

== Later films ==
After guest-starring on The Muppet Show and Alice, Burns appeared in 1978's Sgt. Pepper's Lonely Hearts Club Band, the film based on The Beatles' album of the same name and also recorded a cover of "Fixing A Hole" for the film. In 1979, at 83, Burns starred in two feature films, Just You and Me, Kid and Going in Style. He remained active in films and TV past his 90th birthday. One of his last films was 1988's 18 Again!, based on his half-novelty, half-country music-based hit single, "I Wish I Was Eighteen Again". In this film, Burns played an 81-year-old self-made millionaire industrialist who switched bodies with his awkward, artistic, 18-year-old grandson (played by Charlie Schlatter).

Burns also did regular nightclub stand-up acts in his later years, usually portraying himself as a lecherous old man. He always smoked a cigar onstage and reputedly timed his monologues by the amount the cigar had burned down. For this reason, he preferred cheap El Producto cigars as the loosely wrapped tobacco burned longer. Burns once quipped: "In my youth, they called me a rebel. When I was middle-aged, they called me eccentric. Now that I'm old, I'm doing the same thing I've always done and they're calling me senile."

For most of his life, Burns would smoke between 10 and 20 cigars a day. Arthur Marx estimated that Burns smoked around 300,000 cigars during his lifetime, starting at age 14. In his final years, he smoked no more than four a day, and he never used cigarettes or marijuana, saying, "Look, I can't get any more kicks than I'm getting. What can marijuana do for me that show business hasn't done?" His last feature film role was the cameo role of Milt Lackey, a 100-year-old stand-up comedian, in the 1994 comedy mystery Radioland Murders.

== Final years and death ==
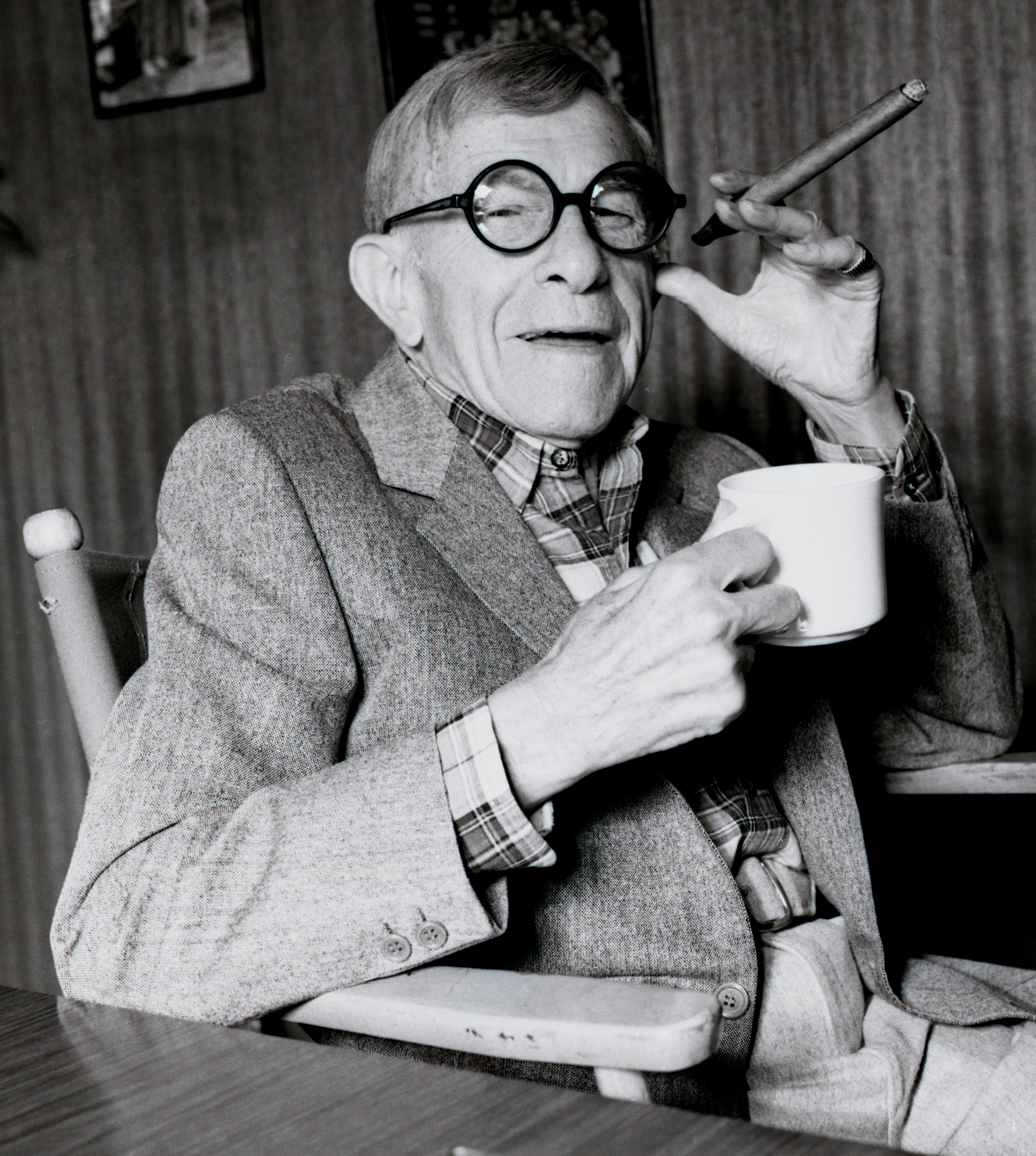
George Burns in 1986

Eight years before his death, Burns publicly admitted that once in their marriage, in the 1950s, he had cheated on Allen. In guilt over the one-night affair, Burns gave Allen a $10,000 diamond ring and a $750 silver centerpiece. Allen learned about the affair but never let on to Burns that she knew, and the couple never discussed it. Burns recounted that years later he discovered his wife Gracie had told her friend Mary Livingstone (the wife of comedian Jack Benny) about the episode, finishing her account by saying to Mary, "You know, I really wish George would cheat on me again; I could use a new centerpiece."

Burns was still appearing at major hotel/casinos in Las Vegas, Reno, and Lake Tahoe during the early 1980s. When he turned 90 in 1986, the city of Los Angeles renamed the northern end of Hamel Road "George Burns Road". City regulations prohibited naming a city street after a living person, but an exception was made for Burns. In celebration of Burns's 99th birthday in 1995, Los Angeles renamed the eastern end of Alden Drive "Gracie Allen Drive". Burns was present at the unveiling ceremony (one of his last public appearances), and quipped: "It's good to be here at the corner of Burns & Allen. At my age, it's good to be anywhere!" George Burns Road and Gracie Allen Drive cross just a few blocks west of the Beverly Center mall in the heart of the Cedars-Sinai Medical Center. Burns served as honorary chairman of the center's endowment drive.

Burns remained in good health for most of his life, in part thanks to a daily exercise regimen of swimming, walks, sit-ups, and push-ups. He bought new Cadillacs every year and drove until the age of 93. After that, Burns had chauffeurs drive him around. In his later years, he also had difficulty reading fine print.

Burns suffered a head injury after falling in his bathtub in 1994 and underwent surgery to remove fluid in his skull. He never fully recovered, and his performing career came to an end. In February 1995, Burns, in one of his final television appearances, was presented with the first SAG Lifetime Achievement Award by the Screen Actors Guild. When he was 96, he had signed a lifetime contract with Caesars Palace in Las Vegas to perform stand-up comedy there, which included the guarantee of a show on his centenary, January 20, 1996. But when that day came, he was too weak to give a performance. In December 1995, Burns was well enough to attend a Christmas party hosted by Frank Sinatra (who turned 80 that month), where he reportedly caught the flu, which weakened him further. He released a statement joking about how he would love for his 100th birthday to have "a night with Sharon Stone". His last television appearance came in a commercial for the Australian Football League's centenary season in 1996, which aired after his death.

On March 9, 1996, Burns died in his Beverly Hills home of heart failure. His funeral was held three days later at the Wee Kirk o' the Heather church in Forest Lawn Memorial Park Cemetery, Glendale. As much as he looked forward to reaching age 100, Burns also said, about a year before he died, that he also looked forward to death, saying that on the day he would die, he would be with Allen again in Heaven. Upon being entombed with Allen, the Freedom Mausoleum’s crypt marker was changed from, "Grace Allen Burns—Beloved Wife And Mother (1902–1964)" to "Gracie Allen (1902–1964) & George Burns (1896–1996)—Together Again". Burns had always said that he wanted Allen to have top billing.

== Legacy ==
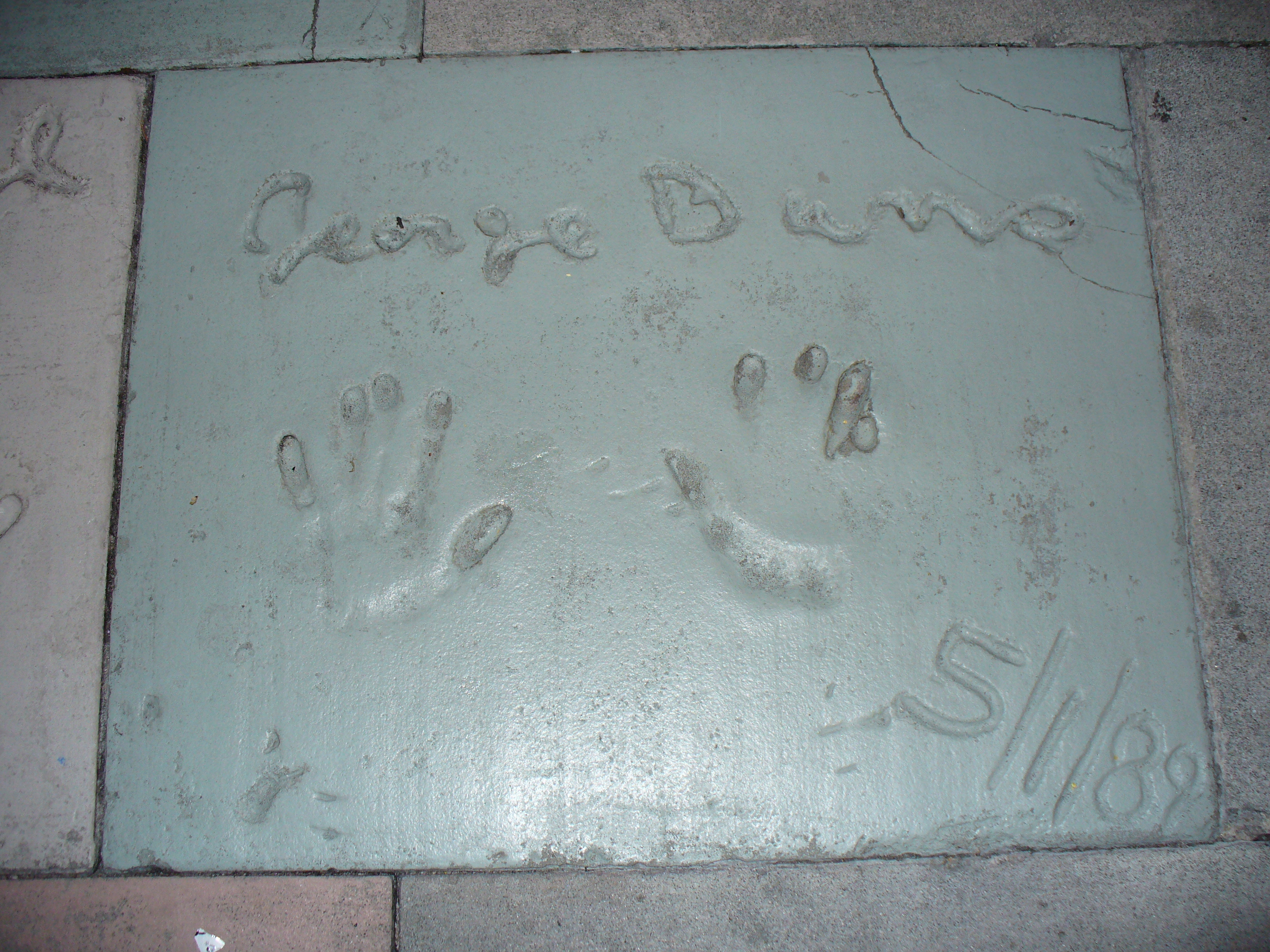
The handprints of George Burns in front of The Great Movie Ride at Walt Disney World's Disney's Hollywood Studios theme park.

George Burns has three stars on the Hollywood Walk of Fame: a motion pictures star at 1639 Vine Street, a television star at 6510 Hollywood Boulevard, and a live performance star at 6672 Hollywood Boulevard. The first two stars were placed during the initial installations of 1960, while the third-star ceremony was held in 1984, in the new category of live performance, or live theatre, established that year. Burns is also a member of the Television Hall of Fame, where he and Gracie Allen were inducted in 1988. There is a street named after Burns in San Antonio, Texas.

He is the subject of Rupert Holmes's one-actor play Say Goodnight, Gracie.

== Bibliography ==
Burns was a bestselling author who wrote ten books:

- Burns, George; Hobart Lindsay, Cynthia (1955). I Love Her, That's Why: An Autobiography. Simon and Schuster.
- Burns, George (1976). Living It Up; or, They Still Love Me in Altoona!. Putnam. ISBN 978-0-399-11636-0.
- Burns, George (1980). The Third Time Around. Putnam. ISBN 978-0-399-12169-2.
- Burns, George (1983). How to Live to Be 100 – Or More: The Ultimate Diet, Sex and Exercise Book (At My Age, Sex Gets Second Billing). Putnam. ISBN 978-0-399-12939-1.
- Burns, George (1984). Dr. Burns' Prescription for Happiness:* *Buy Two Books and Call Me in the Morning. Putnam. ISBN 978-0-399-12964-3.
- Burns, George (1985). Dear George: Advice and Answers from America's Leading Expert on Everything from A to B. Putnam. ISBN 978-0-399-13105-9.
- Burns, George (1988). Gracie: A Love Story. Putnam. ISBN 978-0-399-13384-8.
- Burns, George; Fisher, David (1989). All My Best Friends. Putnam. ISBN 978-0-399-13483-8.
- Burns, George; Goldman, Hal (1992). Wisdom of the 90's. Putnam. ISBN 978-0-399-51777-8.
- Burns, George (1996). 100 Years, 100 Stories. Putnam. ISBN 978-0-399-14179-9.

== Filmography ==
=== Features ===
Year	Title	Role	Notes
1932	The Big Broadcast	Himself	
1933	International House	Doctor Burns	
1933	College Humor	Himself	
1934	Six of a Kind	George Edward	
1934	We're Not Dressing	Himself	
1934	Many Happy Returns	Himself	
1935	Love in Bloom	Himself	
1935	Here Comes Cookie	Himself	
1935	The Big Broadcast of 1936	Himself	
1936	The Big Broadcast of 1937	Mr. Platt	
1936	College Holiday	George Hymen	
1936	Winterset		
1937	A Damsel in Distress	Himself	
1938	College Swing	George Jonas	
1939	Honolulu	Joe Duffy	
1956	The Solid Gold Cadillac	the Narrator (voice)	
1975	The Sunshine Boys	Al Lewis	
1977	Oh, God!	God	
1978	Movie Movie	Himself – Introductory Segments	Uncredited
1978	Sgt. Pepper's Lonely Hearts Club Band	Mr. Kite	
1979	Just You and Me, Kid	Bill	
1979	Going in Style	Joe	
1980	Oh, God! Book II	God	
1982	Two of a Kind	Ross "Boppy" Minor	
1984	Oh, God! You Devil	God / Harry O. Tophet	
1988	18 Again!	Jack Watson / David Watson	
1994	A Century of Cinema	Himself	Documentary
1994	Radioland Murders	Milt Lackey	Last film appearance

=== Short subjects ===
Year	Title	Role	Notes
1929	Lambchops	George the Boyfriend	
1930	Fit to Be Tied	Tie Customer	
1931	Pulling a Bone	Man with a Bone	
1931	The Antique Shop	Customer	
1931	Once Over, Light	Barbershop Customer	
1931	100% Service	George	
1932	Oh, My Operation	the New Patient	
1932	The Babbling Book	George	
1932	Your Hat	Hat Salesman	
1933	Let's Dance	George, a Sailor	
1933	Hollywood on Parade No. A-9	Himself	Uncredited
1933	Walking the Baby	George	
1946	Screen Snapshots: Famous Fathers and Sons	Himself	
1954	Screen Snapshots: Hollywood Grows Up	Himself	
1955	Screen Snapshots: Hollywood Beauty	Himself	
1967	All About People	Narrator	
1973	A Look at the World of Soylent Green	Himself	
1975	The Lion Roars Again	Himself	

== Discography ==
=== Albums ===
Year	Album	Chart positions		Label
Year	Album	U.S. Country	U.S.	Label
1970	George Burns Sings	—	—	Buddah
1975	An Evening with George Burns: Live at Shubert Theater	—	—	Pride
1980	I Wish I Was Eighteen Again	12	93	Mercury
1980	George Burns in Nashville	—	—	Mercury
1982	Young at Heart	—	—	Mercury
1992	As Time Goes By with Bobby Vinton			Curb

=== Singles ===
Year	Single	Chart positions					Album
Year	Single	U.S. Country	U.S.	CAN Country	CAN	CAN AC	Album
1980	"I Wish I Was Eighteen Again"	15	49	8	25	19	I Wish I Was Eighteen Again
1980	"The Arizona Whiz"	85	—	—	—	—	I Wish I Was Eighteen Again
1981	"Willie, Won't You Sing a Song with Me"	66	—	—	—	—	George Burns in Nashville

== Soundtracks ==
- 1978 – Sgt. Pepper's Lonely Hearts Club Band (soundtrack)
- 1996 – Music From The Life: A New Musical (soundtrack)

== Radio series ==
- The Robert Burns Panatella Show 1932–1933; CBS

In their debut series, Burns and Allen shared the bill with Guy Lombardo and his orchestra. The pair launched themselves into national stardom with their first major publicity stunt, Allen's ongoing search for her missing brother.

- The White Owl Program 1933–1934; CBS
- The Adventures of Gracie 1934–1935; CBS
- The Campbell's Tomato Juice Program 1935–1937; CBS
- The Grape Nuts Program 1937–1938; NBC
- The Chesterfield Program 1938–1939; CBS
- The Hinds Honey and Almond Cream Program 1939–1940; CBS

This series featured another publicity stunt which had Allen running for President of the United States.

- The Hormel Program 1940–1941; NBC

Advertised a brand new product called Spam; this show featured musical numbers by jazz great Artie Shaw.

- The Swan Soap Show 1941–1945; NBC, CBS

This series featured a radical format change, in that Burns and Allen played themselves as a married couple for the first time, and the show became a full-fledged domestic situation comedy. This was Burns's response to a marked drop in ratings under the old "Flirtation Act" format (as he later recalled, he finally realized "our jokes are too young for us").

- Maxwell House Coffee Time 1945–1949; NBC
- The Amm-i-Dent Toothpaste Show 1949–1950; CBS

== TV series ==
- The George Burns and Gracie Allen Show 1950–1958; CBS

Broadcast live every other week for the first two seasons, 26 episodes per year. Starting in the third season, all episodes were filmed and broadcast weekly, 40 episodes per year. A total of 291 episodes were created.

- The George Burns Show 1958–1959; NBC

An unsuccessful attempt to continue the format of the Burns and Allen show without Allen, the rest of the cast intact.

- Wendy and Me 1964–1965; ABC

George plays narrator in this short-lived series, just as he had in the Burns and Allen show, but with far less on-screen time, as the focus is on a young couple played by Connie Stevens and Ron Harper. Stevens is, essentially, playing a version of Allen's character.

- George Burns Comedy Week 1985; CBS

Another short-lived series, a weekly comedy anthology program whose only connecting thread was George's presence as host. He does not appear in any of the actual storylines. He was 89 years old when the series was produced.

- The Golden Palace 1992–1993; CBS

Season 1, Episode 15 "Say Goodbye Rose" (1993)

== See also ==
- List of actors with Academy Award nominations
