= The Big Broadcast of 1936 =

1935 musical film by Norman Taurog

- Lobby card
- Directed by: Norman Taurog
- Screenplay by: Walter DeLeon; Francis Martin; Ralph Spence; Jack Mintz
- Produced by: Benjamin Glazer
- Starring: Jack Oakie; Bing Crosby; George Burns; Gracie Allen; Ethel Merman; The Nicholas Brothers; Lyda Roberti; Wendy Barrie; Mary Boland; Charlie Ruggles; Akim Tamiroff
- Cinematography: Leo Tover
- Edited by: Ellsworth Hoagland
- Music by: John Leipold
- Production company: Paramount Pictures
- Distributed by: Paramount Pictures
- Release date: September 20, 1935
- Running time: 97 minutes
- Country: United States
- Language: English

The Big Broadcast of 1936 is a 1935 American comedy film directed by Norman Taurog, and is the second in the series of Big Broadcast movies. The musical comedy starred Jack Oakie, Bing Crosby, George Burns, Gracie Allen, Ethel Merman, The Nicholas Brothers, Lyda Roberti, Wendy Barrie, Mary Boland, Charlie Ruggles, Akim Tamiroff, Amos 'n' Andy (Freeman Gosden and Charles Correll), Bill "Bojangles" Robinson, and Argentinian tango singer Carlos Gardel.

Glenn Miller appears as part of the Ray Noble Orchestra. Their performance was filmed at the Kaufman Astoria Studios in New York. In Glenn Miller and His Orchestra (1974), George Thomas Simon noted that Glenn Miller was paid extra by Ray Noble "for working on The Big Broadcast of 1936, so that Glenn's total weekly pay" was $356. The screen appearance of the Ray Noble orchestra was edited down to a very brief scene on the "televisor". The screenplay was by Walter DeLeon, Francis Martin, Ralph Spence, and Julius J. Epstein, who was uncredited. The film received an Academy Award nomination for Best Dance Direction by LeRoy Prinz for "It's the Animal in Me". Although the film has not been released on DVD or VHS, it is available on various video sharing websites.

== Plot ==
Radio station W.H.Y. owner Spud Miller, also functions as the station's only announcer while his comic partner Smiley Goodwin serves as the house singer, Lochinvar, The Great Lover, "the idol of millions of women." Both Spud and Smiley play the role of Lochinvar. Facing the prospect of bankruptcy, Spud welcomes the suggestions of George Burns and Gracie Allen, who attempt to sell an invention, The Radio Eye, invented by Gracie Allen's uncle, a television device which can pick up and transmit any signal, any time, anywhere. Burns and Allen ask Miller for an advance of $5,000 for the invention. Spud decides to enter an international broadcast competition with a prize of $250,000.

Ysobel listens to the Lochinvar radio show and believes that he has sent her a letter. She finds out that he sends letters to listeners of the show. Outraged, she goes to the radio station to shoot Lochinvar. Spud and Smiley are able to win her over after her gun fails to shoot. They attempt to convince her to invest $5,000 in The Radio Eye invention which would allow them to win the competition. She takes Spud and Smiley to her Caribbean island, Clementi. She will decide to marry one of them before midnight. Gordoni, however, plans to murder them. Spud and Smiley are able to notify George Burns and Gracie Allen in New York and inform them that they are in grave danger. Burns and Allen then depart for the island on a boat. Gracie sets a fire on the boat. A Coast Guard cutter takes them on board and heads for the island. Gordoni has Drowso put in the drinks to put Ysobel to sleep. Spud and Smiley turn on The Radio Eye to listen to the Vienna Boys Choir and the Ray Noble Orchestra from New York to distract Gordoni and his men. Spud and Smiley are able to escape on coaches with teams of horses. After a chase, during which Spud is separated from his horses in a bifurcation in the road, they reach the pier where the Coast Guard and Burns and Allen meet them. Gordoni jumps into the sea. Spud wins the international broadcast competition. Spud tells Ysobel that he may marry her after a period of observation. She tells him: "Let this be the start of a beautiful friendship."

== Production notes ==
Paramount's Big Broadcast series began in 1932 and continued in late 1935 with The Big Broadcast of 1936 (1935), which was released on September 20, 1935. The movie was filmed at the Kaufman Astoria Studios on 3412 36th Street, Astoria, Queens, in New York City. Bing Crosby's cameo, however, was filmed in Hollywood in April 1935.

The movie is a precursor of the later Bob Hope and Bing Crosby "Road" pictures, with Spud and Smiley finding themselves on an island ruled by Countess Ysobel de Nargila (Lyda Roberti).

Daily Variety reported that the scenes featuring Ray Noble and his Orchestra, the Amos 'n' Andy sketches, and the scenes featuring Fox and Walters, were filmed in New York.

Ethel Merman appears in a number cut from the film We're Not Dressing (1934) before release.

== Reception ==
Frank S. Nugent of the The New York Times described the film as "an amusing potpourri of words and music," and commented that this type of film allowed for a disparate group of performers to work together with "a deal of geniality and good humor." While stating that the audience would "really have no time to worry about the plot with all that [is] going on", he felt that the "considerable artistry" of the direction and photography, the "unusual photographic effects", and staging that is "modern, almost impressionistic", combined to give the film value beyond the individual performances.

Variety wrote that the film featured "plenty of names and considerable entertainment" and "there just isn’t time for a ‘plot’, and probably best that none was attempted."

Modern Screen gave the film a four-star review, writing "Paramount’s annual round-up of the radio stars is with us again, and it is our pleasure to announce that this years’s gathering is the most entertaining and the most successful of them all. It may be recalled that in the past a rather flimsy story was tacked around the offerings of the radio celebrities. This season the plot is actually credible; you could send the radio stars home and still enjoy a good comedy… [the film is] goofy but it’s fun."

== Accolades ==
=== American Film Institute recognition ===
- 2004: AFI's 100 Years...100 Songs:
  - "Miss Brown to You" – Nominated

== Soundtrack ==
- "Double Trouble"
  Music by Ralph Rainger, Richard A. Whiting
  Lyrics by Leo Robin
  Performed by Lydia Roberti, Jack Oakie, Henry Wadsworth and chorus
- "I Wished on the Moon"
  Music by Ralph Rainger
  Lyrics by Dorothy Parker
  Sung by Bing Crosby
  Violin accompaniment: Georgie Stoll (uncredited)
- "It's the Animal in Me"
  Music by Harry Revel
  Lyrics by Mack Gordon
  Performed by Ethel Merman
- "Why Dream"
  Music by Ralph Rainger and Richard A. Whiting
  Lyrics by Leo Robin
  Performed by Henry Wadsworth (dubbed by Kenny Baker)
- "Miss Brown To You"
  Music by Ralph Rainger and Richard A. Whiting
  Lyrics by Leo Robin
  Danced by Bill Robinson and The Nicholas Brothers
- "Amargura"
  Music by Carlos Gardel
  Lyrics by Alfredo Le Pera
  Performed by Carlos Gardel
- "Cheating Muchachita"
  Music by Carlos Gardel
  Lyrics by Alfredo Le Pera
  Performed by Carlos Gardel
- "Why Stars Come Out at Night"
  Words and Music by Ray Noble
  Performed by Ray Noble and His Orchestra, featuring Glenn Miller
- "On the Wings of a Waltz"
  Music by Mel Shauer
  Lyrics by Leo Robin
- "A Man, a Maid, a Moon"
  Music by Ralph Rainger
  Lyrics by Leo Robin
- "Is Love a Moon-Flower?"
  Music by Ralph Rainger
  Lyrics by Leo Robin
- "Through the Doorway of Dreams"
  Music by Ralph Rainger and Richard A. Whiting
  Lyrics by Leo Robin
- "Tales from the Vienna Woods"
  Music by Johann Strauss, Jr.
- "William Tell Overture"
  Music by Gioachino Rossini
- "Light Cavalry Overture"
  Music by Franz von Suppé
- "The Very Thought of You"
  Words and Music by Ray Noble
  Performed by Ray Noble and His Orchestra

== Films in series ==
- The Big Broadcast (1932)
- The Big Broadcast of 1937 (1936)
- The Big Broadcast of 1938 (1937)

== Sources ==
- Hischak, Thomas S., ed. The Oxford Companion to the American Musical: Theatre, Film, and Television. Oxford University Press, 2008.
- Hark, Ina Rae. American Cinema of the 1930s: Themes and Variations. Rutgers University Press, 2007, p. 10.
- Simon, George Thomas. Glenn Miller and His Orchestra. Da Capo paperback reprint, 2000.
- Green, Stanley (1999) Hollywood Musicals Year by Year (2nd ed.), pub. Hal Leonard Corporation ISBN 0-634-00765-3 page 48
