= Gracie: A Love Story =

Book by George Burns

- First edition
- Author: George Burns
- Language: English
- Publisher: G. P. Putnam's Sons
- Publication date: 1988
- Pages: 319
- ISBN: 0-399-13384-4
- OCLC: 19740761

Gracie: A Love Story is a 1988 biography of comedian Gracie Allen by George Burns. The tribute to Burns' wife and professional partner reviews their life together and contrasts Allen's scatterbrained public persona with the intelligent actress and devoted wife she actually was.

It was offered as a Book of the Month Club selection. For the audiobook version, Burns received the 1991 Grammy Award for Best Spoken Word Album.

Two condensed versions were released by Reader's Digest in 1989, Condensed Book Club edition #183 (with Doctors by Erich Segal; the Giant's Shadow by Thomas Bontly and The Toothache Tree by Jack Galloway) and the Best Sellers Series edition (with The Negotiator by Frederick Forsyth).

== Publication history ==
- 1988: New York: G. P. Putnam's Sons, 1988, hardcover
- 1988: New York: Simon & Schuster Audioworks, 1988, audiocassette
- 1989: New York: Penguin Books, November 1, 1989, paperback
