= We're Not Dressing =

1934 film by Benjamin Glazer, Norman Taurog

- Theatrical release poster
- Directed by: Norman Taurog
- Screenplay by: Horace Jackson; Francis Martin; George Marion Jr.
- Story by: Walton Hall Smith; Benjamin Glazer
- Based on: The Admirable Crichton by J. M. Barrie
- Produced by: Benjamin Glazer
- Starring: Bing Crosby; Carole Lombard; George Burns; Gracie Allen; Ethel Merman; Ray Milland
- Cinematography: Charles Lang
- Edited by: Stuart Heisler
- Music by: Mack Gordon; Harry Revel
- Production company: Paramount Pictures
- Distributed by: Paramount Pictures
- Release date: April 26, 1934 (USA)
- Running time: 77 minutes
- Country: United States
- Language: English

We're Not Dressing is a 1934 pre-Code screwball musical comedy film directed by Norman Taurog and starring Bing Crosby, Carole Lombard, George Burns, Gracie Allen and Ethel Merman. Based on the 1902 J. M. Barrie play The Admirable Crichton, the film is about a beautiful yacht owner (Lombard) who becomes stranded on an island with her socialite friends, a wacky husband-and-wife research team (Burns and Allen) and a singing sailor (Crosby). The supporting cast features Leon Errol and Ray Milland.

== Plot ==
Spoiled socialite Doris Worthington (Lombard) is sailing the Pacific with her friend Edith (Merman) and her Uncle Hubert (Errol), while being courted by Prince Michael (Milland) and Prince Alexander (Henry). She is bored, however, and finds entertainment in verbal sparring with one of the sailors, Stephen Jones (Crosby). During one of their battles, Doris slaps Stephen, who retaliates by kissing her and gets fired. In a drunken accident, Uncle Hubert runs the yacht onto a reef in the fog. Stephen rescues the unconscious Doris as the others flee the capsized ship, and everyone makes it to the tropical island although the princes claim credit for Doris's rescue. Unfortunately, the only person with any survival skills is Stephen, and the socialites are quick to demand that he gather food and build shelter. Stephen attempts to divide up the work but the haughty passengers snub his leadership so he fends for himself. The smells from Stephen's dinner of mussels and coconuts soon entice the hungry passengers to gather their own food; all except Doris, who tricks Stephen to get his food and gets slapped in turn. The group is forced to cooperate, although Doris remains indignant and infuriated.

Doris discovers that there are other people on the island when she falls prey to a lion trap in the jungle: zany Gracie (Allen) and scientific husband George (Burns) live on the other side of the not-so-deserted isle. She refuses their offer to stay in favor of getting even with Stephen. Doris arranges for some tools and clothes to float past Stephen, who is elated at his "discovery" and quickly builds a house. The couple admit their love that evening but feel mismatched.

Two rescue boats arrive. In the hubbub, Stephen finds out that the clothes and tools came from Doris and is angry at being the butt of the joke. Stephen takes a different boat than Doris. As Doris watches the princes resume their womanizing ways on board ship, she realizes she misses Stephen. She changes ships to join him, for better or for worse.

== Cast ==
- Bing Crosby as Stephen Jones
- Carole Lombard as Doris Worthington
- George Burns as George Martin
- Gracie Allen as Gracie Martin
- Ethel Merman as Edith
- Leon Errol as Uncle Hubert
- Ray Milland as Prince Michael Stofani (billed as Raymond Milland)
- Jay Henry as Prince Alexander Stofani
- Ernie Adams as Sailor
- Stanley Blystone as Doris's Officer

== Production ==
We're Not Dressing was filmed at Paramount Studios in Hollywood, and Santa Catalina Island.

== Reception ==
Mordaunt Hall of The New York Times wrote, "This musical tale appears to have been inspired to a certain extent by the Barrie play "The Admirable Crichton," but it is merely a fluffy bundle of laughter and chansons d'amour ... It has all the plausibility and romantic flavor of the average musical comedy. It is nicely photographed and cleverly directed, the sort of thing that, while it may have too many moaning melodies, is invariably diverting."

Variety commented, " ... Where it's light and familiar on the story it's heavy on sturdy croonology by Bing Crosby, who makes the footage a vocal delight ... All in all a cinch audience picture—any audience... The vocalizing is all Crosby's. While he may be crooning constantly he does it so well (and not too implausibly because he is discovered as a naturally singing deck washer) that it's forgivable. What's more, a little effective business is introduced with the bear, who responds only to the 'May I?' song ... Crosby himself is most of the picture. He screens his best and sings better."

== Soundtrack ==
- "Sailor's Chanty (It's a Lie)" (Harry Revel, Mack Gordon) by Bing Crosby
- "It's Just a New Spanish Custom" (Harry Revel, Mack Gordon) by Ethel Merman and Leon Errol
- "Billy Boy" (Traditional)
- "I Positively Refuse to Sing" (Harry Revel, Mack Gordon) by Bing Crosby
- "Stormy Weather" (Harold Arlen, Ted Koehler) by Bing Crosby
- "Who's Afraid of the Big Bad Wolf?" (Frank Churchill, Ann Ronell) by Bing Crosby
- "The Last Round-Up (Git Along, Little Dogie, Git Along)" (Billy Hill) by Bing Crosby
- "May I?" (Harry Revel, Mack Gordon) by Bing Crosby
- "Goodnight Lovely Little Lady" (Harry Revel, Mack Gordon) by Bing Crosby
- "She Reminds Me of You" (Harry Revel, Mack Gordon) by Bing Crosby
- "El Capitan" (John Philip Sousa)
- "Love Thy Neighbor" (Harry Revel, Mack Gordon) by Bing Crosby
- "Let's Play House" (Harry Revel, Mack Gordon) by Ethel Merman and Leon Errol
- "Did You Ever See a Dream Walking?" (Harry Revel, Mack Gordon)
- "Once in a Blue Moon" (Harry Revel, Mack Gordon) by Bing Crosby
- "Aloha Oe" (Queen Liliuokalani) played on accordion by Gracie Allen

Crosby recorded some of the songs for Brunswick Records: "Love Thy Neighbor", "Goodnight Lovely Little Lady" and ""Once in a Blue Moon"" reached the pop charts of the day, peaking at numbers 2, 2 and 11 respectively.
