= The Big Broadcast of 1937 =

1936 film by Mitchell Leisen, Norman Taurog

- Directed by: Mitchell Leisen
- Written by: Erwin Gelsey; Arthur Kober; Barry Trivers
- Screenplay by: Walter DeLeon; Francis Martin
- Produced by: Lewis E. Gensler
- Starring: Jack Benny; George Burns; Gracie Allen
- Cinematography: Theodor Sparkuhl
- Edited by: Stuart Gilmore
- Music by: Marlin Skiles; Victor Young
- Distributed by: Paramount Pictures
- Release date: October 6, 1936
- Running time: 100 minutes
- Country: United States
- Language: English

The Big Broadcast of 1937 is a 1936 Paramount Pictures production directed by Mitchell Leisen, and is the third in the series of Big Broadcast movies. The musical comedy stars Jack Benny, George Burns, Gracie Allen, Bob Burns, Martha Raye, Shirley Ross, Ray Milland, Benny Fields, Frank Forest and the orchestra of Benny Goodman (featuring Gene Krupa). It was in this film that Leopold Stokowski made his movie debut conducting two of his Bach transcriptions. Uncredited roles include Jack Mulhall.

German animator Oskar Fischinger was hired to create an animation sequence in Technicolor. However, when Paramount changed the production to black-and-white, Fischinger's original abstract animation design was changed to a hybrid animation and live-action sequence showing consumer products emanating from a broadcasting tower, to the song "Radio Dynamics" by Ralph Rainger.

== Plot ==
Jack Carson produces a radio show. Mrs. Platt is the show's sponsor. Her company makes golf balls. Patsy is Carson's assistant, who turns out to be a rousing singer. There is a story line involving star-crossed lovers, naturally. The rest is various performances on various radio shows.

== Cast ==
- Jack Benny as Jack Carson
- George Burns as Mr. Platt
- Gracie Allen as Mrs. Platt
- Bob Burns as humorist Bob Black
- Ellen Drew as Telephone Girl
- Frank Forest as operatic singer Frank Rossman
- Benny Goodman and his orchestra
- Gene Krupa drummer in Goodman's orchestra
- Ray Milland as Bob Miller
- Martha Raye as Patsy
- Shirley Ross as Gwen Holmes
- Leopold Stokowski and his orchestra
- Donald Hulbert as Page boy

== Reception ==
Leonard Maltin described it as an "almost unbearable musical" that "manages to waste the talent of its formidable cast", giving it 1½ out of 4 stars.

== Films in series ==
- The Big Broadcast (1932)
- The Big Broadcast of 1936 (1935)
- The Big Broadcast of 1938 (1937)
