= Many Happy Returns (1934 film) =

1934 film by Norman Z. McLeod

- Directed by: Norman Z. McLeod
- Written by: Lady Mary Cameron (story "Often a Bridegroom"), Ray Harris, Keene Thompson
- Screenplay by: Claude Binyon, J.P. McEvoy
- Cinematography: Henry Sharp
- Edited by: Richard C. Currier
- Music by: Arthur Johnston (uncredited)
- Production company: Paramount Pictures
- Release date: June 8, 1934
- Running time: 64 minutes
- Country: United States
- Language: English

Many Happy Returns is a 1934 American pre-Code Paramount Pictures comedy film directed by Norman Z. McLeod and starring Gracie Allen, George Burns and George Barbier.

== Cast ==
- Gracie Allen as herself
- George Burns as himself
- George Barbier as Horatio Allen
- Joan Marsh as Florence Allen
- Ray Milland as Ted Lambert
- Stanley Fields as Joe
- William Demarest as Brinker
- Johnny Arthur as Davis
- Franklin Pangborn as Allen's Secretary
- Egon Brecher as Dr. Otto von Strudel
- Jack Mulhall as actor
- Morgan Wallace as Nathan Silas
- Kenneth Thomson as Motion Picture Director
- Guy Lombardo as himself
- Veloz and Yolanda as specialty dancers

== Reception ==
In a contemporary review for The New York Times, critic Mordaunt Hall wrote: "[The film] depends chiefly on Gracie Allen and George Burns for its mirth. It is one of those impossible features where almost anything is likely to happen. Given the slightest excuse, orchestral and other music is played. .... The activities in this film in going from Gotham to Hollywood appear to have been a little too much for both Miss Allen and Mr. Burns, for they seem to have run out of really funny lines."
