= Here Comes Cookie =

1935 film by Norman Z. McLeod

- Directed by: Norman Z. McLeod
- Screenplay by: Don Hartman
- Story by: Don Hartman; Sam Mintz
- Produced by: William LeBaron
- Starring: George Burns; Gracie Allen; George Barbier; Betty Furness; Andrew Tombes; Rafael Storm
- Cinematography: Gilbert Warrenton
- Edited by: Richard C. Currier
- Music by: Friedrich Hollaender
- Production company: Paramount Pictures
- Distributed by: Paramount Pictures
- Release date: August 30, 1935
- Running time: 65 minutes
- Country: United States
- Language: English

Here Comes Cookie is a 1935 American comedy film directed by Norman Z. McLeod, written by Don Hartman, and starring George Burns, Gracie Allen, George Barbier, Betty Furness, Andrew Tombes and Rafael Storm. The picture was released on August 30, 1935, by Paramount Pictures.

== Plot ==
Millionaire Harrison Allen is determined that his daughter Phyllis does not marry her fortune-hunting beau, Ramon del Ramos. Harrison and his secretary, George Burns, draw up a document in which Harrison temporarily signs over his fortune to his other daughter Gracie, who calls herself "Cookie," for a period of sixty days, in order to prove Ramon's avarice. While Harrison goes back to his hometown for a vacation, witless Gracie takes her father's farce to heart and proceeds to destroy his fortune and his home. She cuts George's salary, refuses to send her father any money, and destroys everyone's clothes so they will look like tramps. While the butler, Botts, George and Phyllis slowly starve, they also lose their sleep because Gracie turns the mansion into a no-cost boardinghouse for hundreds of out-of-work actors and their animals. When Ramon realizes that Gracie has all the money, he pursues her, and she naively decides to marry him. Spirits reach an all-time low when Botts finds it preferable to sleep on a park bench, rather than compete with an actor for a bed. At his wits end, Botts sells a trained seal to raise enough money to send Phyllis to Clarksville and retrieve her father. Meanwhile, Gracie is tearing down the inside of the mansion to construct a theater. She plans to stage a show that will do so poorly, that the family will be broke and Harrison will let her marry Ramon. Since Gracie has sent no money, Harrison and Phyllis are forced to hitchhike part of the way home. They arrive in a taxicab, owing the driver over one hundred dollars, on the opening night of "Gracie Allen's Flop," but are refused admittance. They sneak into the mansion and stumble on stage during Gracie's unintentionally comic balcony scene from Romeo and Juliet . George brings telegrams from Hollywood with offers to hire Gracie as a producer, because her show is a big success. At Harrison's insistence, George agrees to marry Gracie, but only on condition that while she is on the West Coast, he is in the East.

== Cast ==
- George Burns as George Burns
- Gracie Allen as Gracie Allen
- George Barbier as Harrison Allen
- Betty Furness as Phyllis Allen
- Andrew Tombes as Botts
- Rafael Storm as Ramon del Ramos
- James Burke as Broken-Nose Reilly
- Lee Kohlmar as Mr. Dingledorp
- Milla Davenport as Mrs. Dingledorp
- Harry Holman as Stuffy
- Frank Darien as Clyde
- Jack Powell as Drummer
- Irving Bacon as Thompson
- Guinn "Big Boy" Williams as Big Boy
- Nick Moro as Specialty Act
- Frank Yaconelli as Specialty Act
- The Six Olympics as Acrobats
- The Buccaneers as Vaudeville Act
- The Six Candreya Brothers as Vaudeville Act
- Johnson and Dove as Vaudeville Act
- Three Jacks and a Queen as Vaudeville Act
- The Wheelers as Vaudeville Act
