= Women Without Names (1940 film) =

American crime drama

- Directed by: Robert Florey
- Written by: William R. Lipman; Horace McCoy
- Based on: Ladies of the Big House; 1931 play by Ernest Granville Booth
- Starring: Ellen Drew; Robert Paige; Judith Barrett; Louise Beavers; John Miljan
- Cinematography: Charles Lang
- Edited by: Anne Bauchens
- Music by: Gerard Carbonara; John Leipold (uncredited)
- Distributed by: Paramount Pictures
- Release date: March 15, 1940
- Running time: 62 minutes
- Country: United States
- Language: English

Women Without Names is a 1940 American drama film directed by Robert Florey.

== Plot ==
Joyce (Ellen Drew) and Fred (Robert Paige) are convicted of murder. He is sentenced to the electric chair; she to prison. She escapes and sets out to prove their innocence with the aid of Assistant DA Marlin (John Miljan).

== Cast ==
- Ellen Drew as Joyce King
- Robert Paige as Fred MacNeil
- Judith Barrett as Peggy Athens
- John Miljan as District Attorney John Marlin
- Fay Helm as Millie
- John McGuire as Walter Ferris
- Louise Beavers as Ivory
- James Seay as O'Grane
- Esther Dale as Head Matron Ingles
- Marjorie Main as Matron Lowery
- Audrey Maynard as Maggie
- Kitty Kelly as Countess
- Virginia Dabney as Ruffles McWade
- Helen Lynch as Susie
- Mae Busch as Rose
