= Ernest Booth =

Ernest Booth may refer to:

- Ernie Booth (1876–1935), New Zealand rugby union player
- Ernest Granville Booth (1898–1959), American criminal and screenwriter
