= Freeman Wood =

American actor (1896–1956)

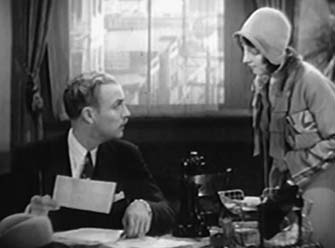
- Wood (left) with Elinor Flynn in Ladies in Love (1930)
- Born: July 1, 1896; Denver, Colorado, United States
- Died: February 15, 1956 (aged 59); Hollywood, California, United States
- Occupation: Actor
- Years active: 1919–44

Freeman Wood (July 1, 1896 – February 15, 1956) was an American character actor of the silent and sound film eras.

== Biography ==
Born in 1896 in Denver, Colorado, Wood would appear in his first film in 1919, The Adventure Shop. Early in his career he would have larger roles, often as the rival love interest to the main character, but his roles would get smaller and smaller as time went on. By 1933 he was relegated to what amounted to as bit parts, with his character often being unnamed. Over his 25-year career he would appear in over 60 films, the last of which was in a small role in 1944's Once Upon a Time, starring Cary Grant, Janet Blair, and James Gleason.

== Filmography ==
(Per AFI database)

An * denotes a featured or starring role

- The Adventure Shop (1919) -
- Diane of Star Hollow (1921) - Dick Harrison
- Made in Heaven (1921) - Davidge*
- High Heels (1921) - Cortland Van Ness*
- The Rage of Paris (1921) - Jimmy Allen
- White Hands (1922) - Ralph Alden*
- The Frozen North (1922)-Husband
- Fashion Row (1923) - Eric Van Corland*
- Divorce (1923) - Townsend Perry
- Gossip (1923) - Robert Williamson*
- Innocence (1923) - Don Hampton*
- The Man Alone (1923) - George Perry*
- Out of Luck (1923) - Cyril La Mount
- Broken Hearts of Broadway (1923) - Frank Huntleigh
- The Wild Party (1923) - Jack Cummings*
- Butterfly (1924) - Cecil Atherton
- The Female (1924) - Clon Biron*
- The Gaiety Girl (1924) - Christopher "Kit" Kershaw*
- The Girl on the Stairs (1924) - Dick Wakefield*
- One Glorious Night (1924) - Chester James*
- The Price She Paid (1924) - Stanley Baird
- The Dancers (1925) - Evan Caruthers
- Hearts and Spurs (1925) - Oscar Estabrook*
- The Part Time Wife (1925) - DeWitt Courtney*
- Raffles, the Amateur Cracksman (1925) - Bunny Manners
- Scandal Proof (1925) - Monty Brandster*
- Wings of Youth (1925) - Lucien Angoola*
- Josselyn's Wife (1926) - Mr. Arthur*
- The Lone Wolf Returns (1926) - Mallison*
- Mannequin (1926) - Terry Allen*
- The Prince of Broadway (1926) - Wade Turner*
- A Social Celebrity (1926) - Gifford Jones
- McFadden's Flats (1927) - Desmond Halloran
- The Coward (1927) - Leigh Morlock*
- Taxi! Taxi! (1927) - Jersey
- The Garden of Eden (1928) - Musical director
- Half a Bride (1928) - Jed Session*
- The Legion of the Condemned (1928) - Richard De Witt
- The Little Yellow House (1928) - Wells Harbison*
- Scarlet Youth (1928) - (unknown)*
- Chinatown Nights (1929) - Gerald
- Why Bring That Up? (1929) - Powell
- Ladies in Love (1930) - Ward Hampton*
- Lilies of the Field (1930) - Lewis Conroy*
- Only the Brave (1930) - Elizabeth's lover
- The Swellhead (1930) - Clive Warren
- Young Eagles (1930) - Lieutenant Mason
- Kept Husbands (1931) - Mr. Post
- Evenings for Sale (1932) - Von Zelling
- Lady with a Past (1932) - Patterson
- I Believed in You (1934) - Guest at party
- Desirable (1934) -
- Fugitive Lady (1934) -
- Go into Your Dance (1935) - Head waiter
- I Live My Life (1935) - Waterbury Jr.
- Redheads on Parade (1935) - Salesman
- Too Many Parents (1936) - Clinton's stepfather
- Two-Fisted Gentleman (1936) -
- Wells Fargo (1937) -
- Danger – Love at Work (1937) - Jones
- The House Across the Bay (1940) - Mr. Hanson
- She Knew All the Answers (1941) -
- Once Upon a Time (1944) -
