= Luring Lips =

1921 silent film

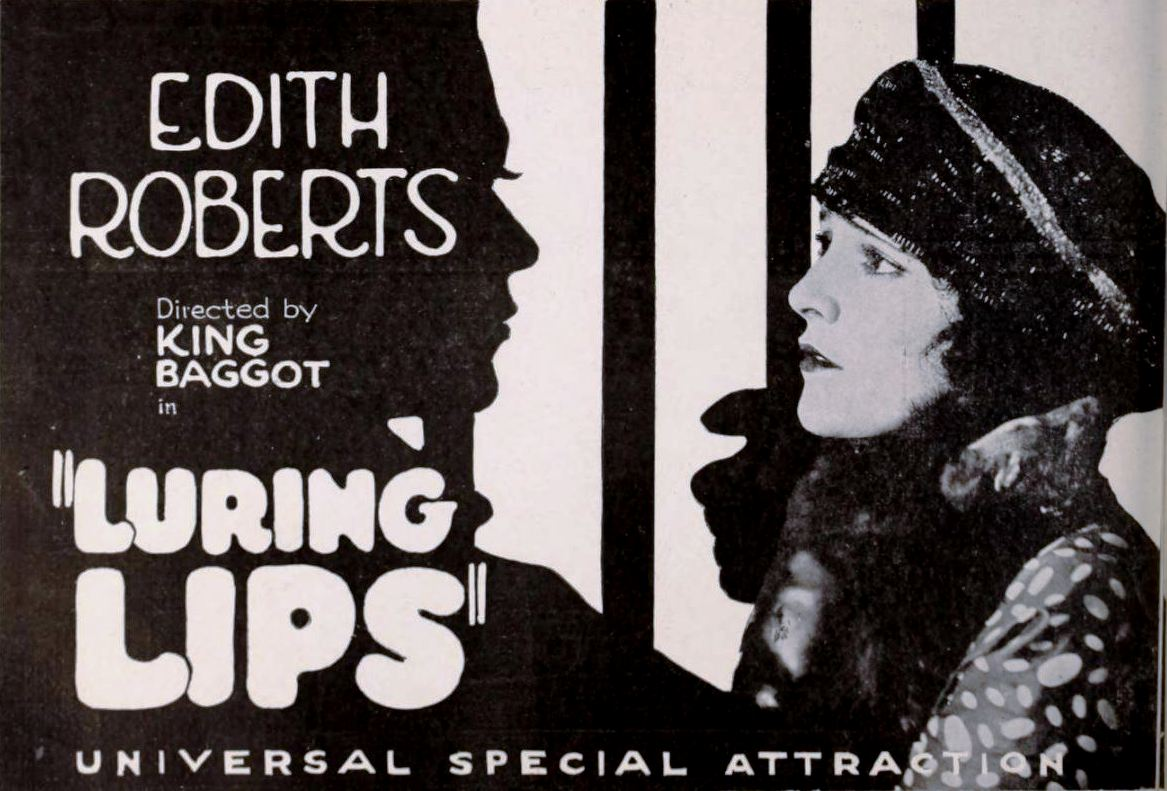
- Directed by: King Baggot
- Written by: George Hively
- Produced by: Carl Laemmle
- Starring: Edith Roberts; Ramsey Wallace; William Welsh
- Cinematography: Virgil Miller
- Production company: Universal Pictures
- Distributed by: Universal Pictures
- Release date: July 25, 1921
- Running time: 50 minutes
- Country: United States
- Languages: Silent; English intertitles

Luring Lips is a 1921 American silent drama film directed by King Baggot and starring Edith Roberts, Ramsey Wallace and William Welsh.

== Cast ==
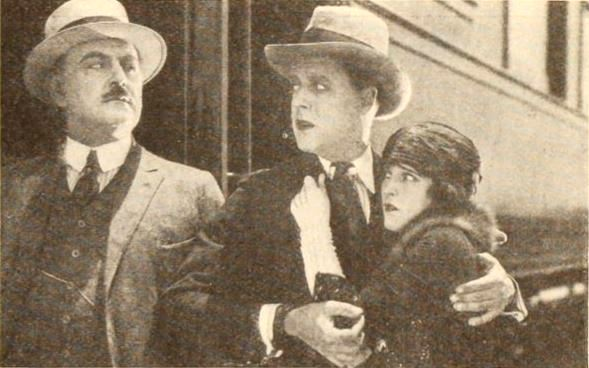
Darrell Foss and Edith Roberts in Luring Lips

- Edith Roberts as Adele Martin
- Darrell Foss as Dave Martin
- Ramsey Wallace as Frederick Vibart
- William Welsh as James Tierney
- Carlton S. King as Mark Fuller
- Mortimer E. Stinson as Detective

== Bibliography ==
- Munden, Kenneth White. The American Film Institute Catalog of Motion Pictures Produced in the United States, Part 1. University of California Press, 1997.
