= Alyson Shaffer =

American film editor

- Born: December 17, 1894; Norfolk, Virginia, USA
- Died: June 1974 (aged 79); New York, New York, USA
- Occupation: Film editor

Alyson Shaffer (1894–1974) was an American film editor active during the late 1920s and early 1930s. She worked at Paramount and collaborated with filmmakers like William A. Wellman. Her first known credit was on 1928's The Legion of the Condemned.

Shaffer, who was born in Virginia, moved to Hollywood by 1920, where she first worked as a studio stenographer before working her way up into an editing role. She lost her job in 1932 and never worked in the industry again.

== Selected filmography ==
- La riva dei bruti (1931)
- Tom Sawyer (1930)
- Follow Thru (1930)
- Young Eagles (1930)
- Woman Trap (1929)
- The River of Romance (1929)
- The Man I Love (1929)
- Chinatown Nights (1929)
- Beggars of Life (1928)
- Ladies of the Mob (1928)
- His Tiger Wife (1928)
- The Legion of the Condemned (1928)
