= A Voice in the Dark (film) =

1921 film

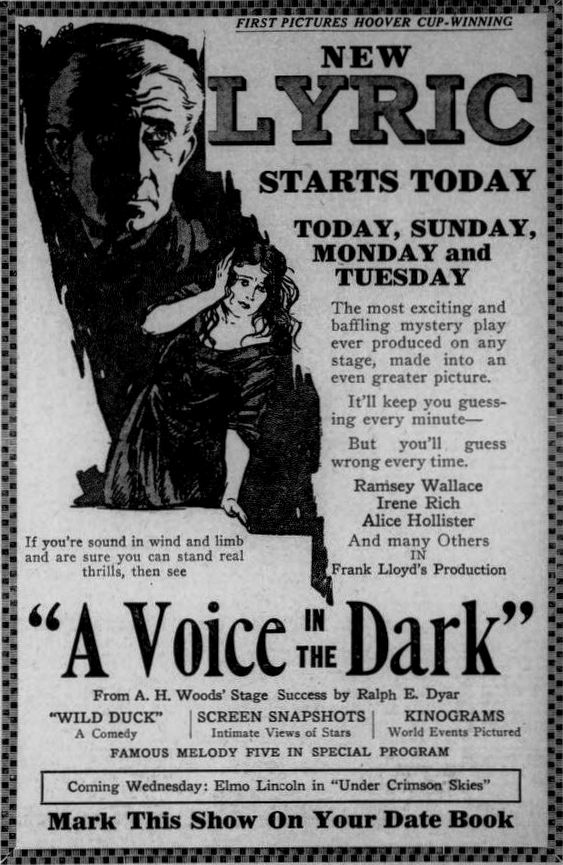
- Newspaper advertising
- Directed by: Frank Lloyd
- Screenplay by: Ralph E. Dyar; Arthur F. Statter
- Based on: A Voice in the Dark by Ralph E. Dyar
- Starring: Ramsey Wallace; Irene Rich; Alec B. Francis
- Production company: Goldwyn Pictures Corporation
- Distributed by: Goldwyn Pictures Corporation
- Release date: 26 March 1921 (United States)
- Running time: 50 minutes
- Country: United States
- Language: English

A Voice in the Dark is a 1921 American black-and-white silent mystery film directed by Frank Lloyd and starring Ramsey Wallace, Irene Rich, and Alec B. Francis. The film is based on the play A Voice in the Dark by Ralph E. Dyar (New York, July 28, 1919).

== Plot ==
Two sisters engaged on the same day: Adele, the younger, to Dr. Hugh Sainsbury, and Blanche, the eldest, to Harlan Day, an assistant district attorney. They are both suspected of committing a murder when Sainsbury is found dead. Blanche has a motive as Sainsbury almost dishonored her so that she wanted to prevent her sister from marrying him. Thanks to the testimony of two witnesses, a deaf woman and a blind man residing in the sanatorium where Sainsbury was working, the murder is resolved: the culprit is Amelia Ellingham, a nurse whom Sainsbury had seduced and to whom he had proposed to marry.

== Cast ==
- Ramsey Wallace as Harlan Day
- Irene Rich as Blanche Walton
- Alec B. Francis as Joseph Crampton (as Alec Francis)
- Alan Hale as Dr. Hugh Sainsbury
- Ora Carew as Adele Walton
- William Scott as Chester Thomas
- Richard Tucker as Lieutenant Patrick Cloyd
- Alice Hollister as Amelia Ellingham
- Gertrude Norman as Mrs. Lydiard
- James Neill as Edward Small

== Preservation status ==
- A print is preserved in the Library of Congress.
