= Henry W. Gerrard =

British cinematographer

- Born: 3 January 1899; London, United Kingdom
- Died: 19 November 1934 (aged 35); Los Angeles, California, United States
- Other name: Henry Gerrard
- Occupation: Cinematographer
- Years active: 1918–1934 (film)

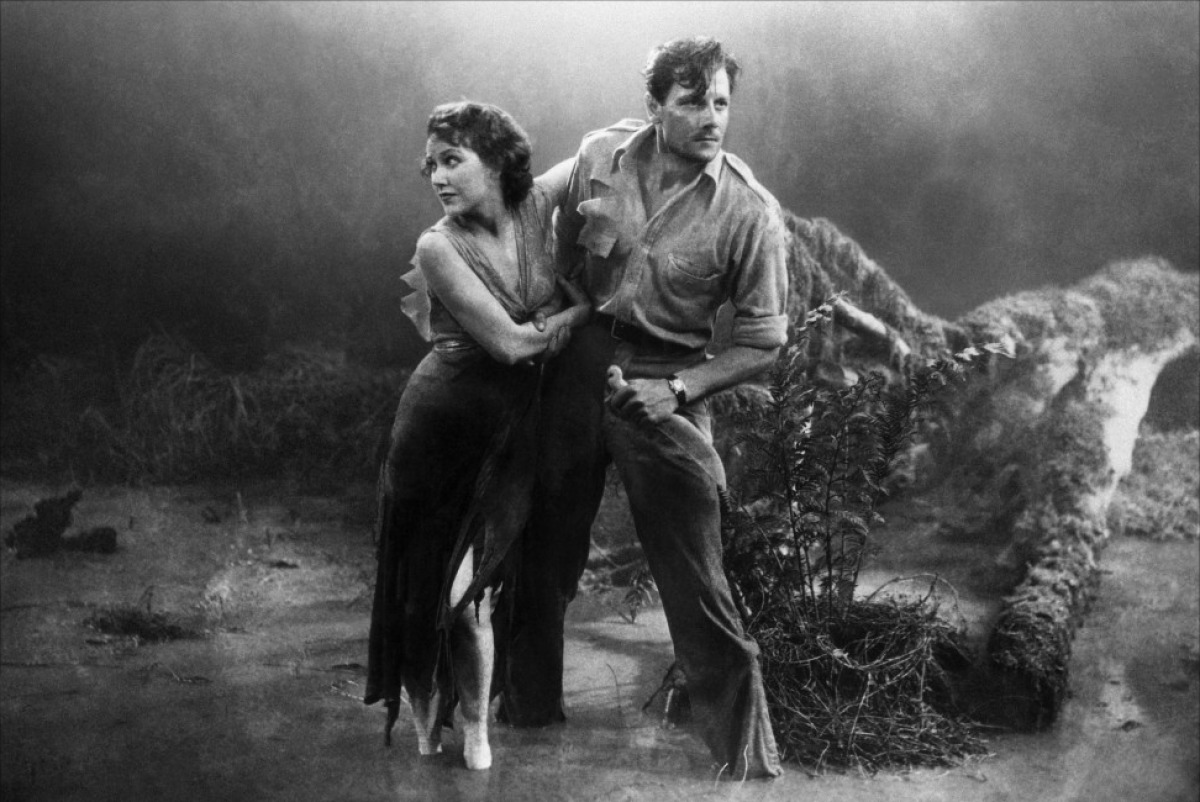
Still for The Most Dangerous Game (1932)

Henry W. Gerrard (1899–1934) was a British cinematographer, active during the silent and early sound era in Hollywood. Employed in the early 1930s on notable productions such as Little Women, Of Human Bondage and The Little Minister at RKO Pictures. He is particularly noted for his work on the 1932 film The Most Dangerous Game. He also returned to London to work on Many Waters for British International Pictures. His career was halted by his sudden death at the age of thirty five.

== Filmography ==
- Ali Baba and the Forty Thieves (1918)
- Shootin' Irons (1927)
- Doomsday (1928)
- Ladies of the Mob (1928)
- The Magnificent Flirt (1928)
- The Legion of the Condemned (1928)
- Interference (1928)
- Beggars of Life (1928)
- His Private Life (1928)
- Woman Trap (1929)
- Betrayal (1929)
- Chinatown Nights (1929)
- Thunderbolt (1929)
- The Greene Murder Case (1929)
- The Man I Love (1929)
- Playboy of Paris (1930)
- Follow Thru (1930)
- The Vagabond King (1930)
- Honey (1930 film) (1930)
- Safety in Numbers (1930)
- Along Came Youth (1930)
- Fighting Caravans (1931)
- The Little Cafe (1931)
- Many Waters (1931)
- Dude Ranch (1931)
- Two White Arms (1932)
- The Phantom of Crestwood (1932)
- The Penguin Pool Murder (1932)
- The Most Dangerous Game (1932)
- Blind Adventure (1933)
- Little Women (1933)
- Success at Any Price (1934)
- Of Human Bondage (1934)
- The Fountain (1934)
- Man of Two Worlds (1934)
- The Little Minister (1934)

== Bibliography ==
- Jones, David Annwn. Re-envisaging the First Age of Cinematic Horror, 1896-1934: Quanta of Fear. University of Wales Press, 2018.
- Petrie, Duncan. The British Cinematographer. British Film Institute Publishing, 1996.
