= Gossip (1923 film) =

1923 silent film

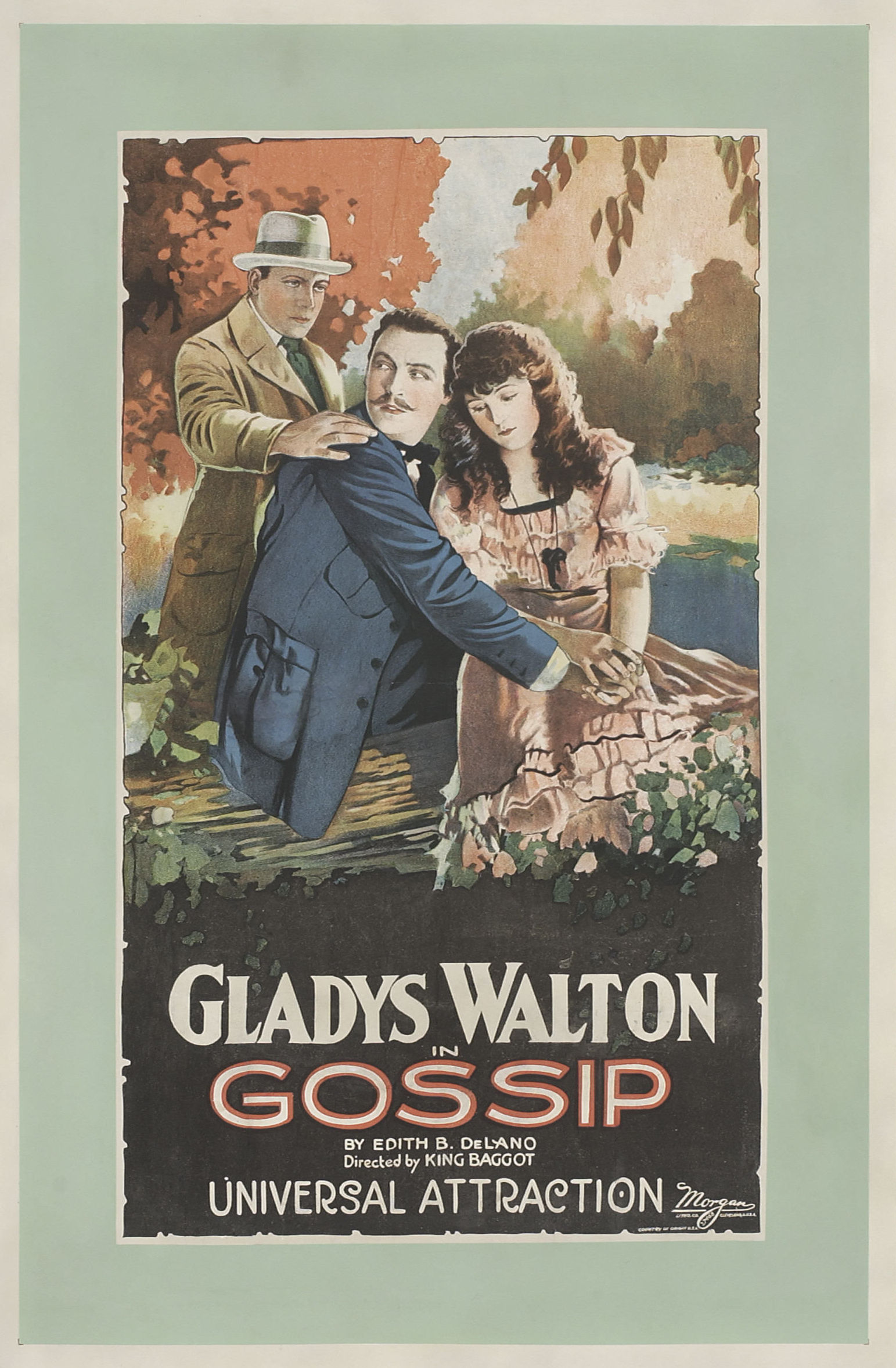
- Directed by: King Baggot
- Written by: Edith Barnard Delano; Hugh Hoffman
- Produced by: Carl Laemmle
- Starring: Gladys Walton; Ramsey Wallace; Albert Prisco
- Cinematography: Victor Milner
- Production company: Universal Pictures
- Distributed by: Universal Pictures
- Release date: March 12, 1923
- Running time: 50 minutes
- Country: United States
- Languages: Silent; English intertitles

Gossip is a 1923 American silent drama film directed by King Baggot and starring Gladys Walton, Ramsey Wallace and Albert Prisco.

== Cast ==
- Gladys Walton as Caroline Weatherbee
- Ramsey Wallace as Hiram Ward
- Albert Prisco as John Magoo
- Freeman Wood as Robert Williamson
- Carol Holloway as Mrs. Boyne

== Bibliography ==
- Munden, Kenneth White. The American Film Institute Catalog of Motion Pictures Produced in the United States, Part 1. University of California Press, 1997.
