= The Call of Home =

1922 film

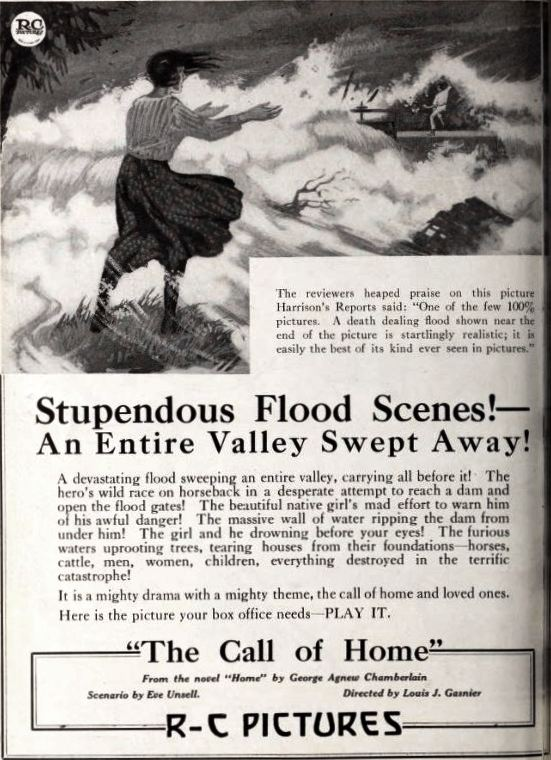
- Directed by: Louis J. Gasnier
- Written by: Eve Unsell
- Starring: Léon Bary; Irene Rich; Ramsey Wallace
- Cinematography: Joseph A. Dubray
- Production company: Robertson-Cole Pictures Corporation
- Distributed by: Robertson-Cole Pictures Corporation
- Release date: February 5, 1922
- Running time: 60 minutes
- Country: United States
- Languages: Silent; English intertitles

The Call of Home is a 1922 American silent drama film directed by Louis J. Gasnier and starring Léon Bary, Irene Rich and Ramsey Wallace.

== Plot ==
The movie features flood scenes filmed in the Colorado river region.

== Cast ==
- Léon Bary as Alan Wayne
- Irene Rich as Alix Lansing
- Ramsey Wallace as Gerry Lansing
- Margaret Mann as Gerry's Mother
- Jobyna Ralston as Clem
- Genevieve Blinn as Nancy Wayne
- Wadsworth Harris as Captain Wayne
- James O. Barrows as Butler
- Carl Stockdale as Kemp
- Emmett King as Lieber
- Norma Nichols as Margarita
- Sidney Franklin as Priest
- Harry Lonsdale as Consul

== Bibliography ==
- Connelly, Robert B. The Silents: Silent Feature Films, 1910-36, Volume 40, Issue 2. December Press, 1998.
- Munden, Kenneth White. The American Film Institute Catalog of Motion Pictures Produced in the United States, Part 1. University of California Press, 1997.
