= White Hands (film) =

1922 film by Lambert Hillyer

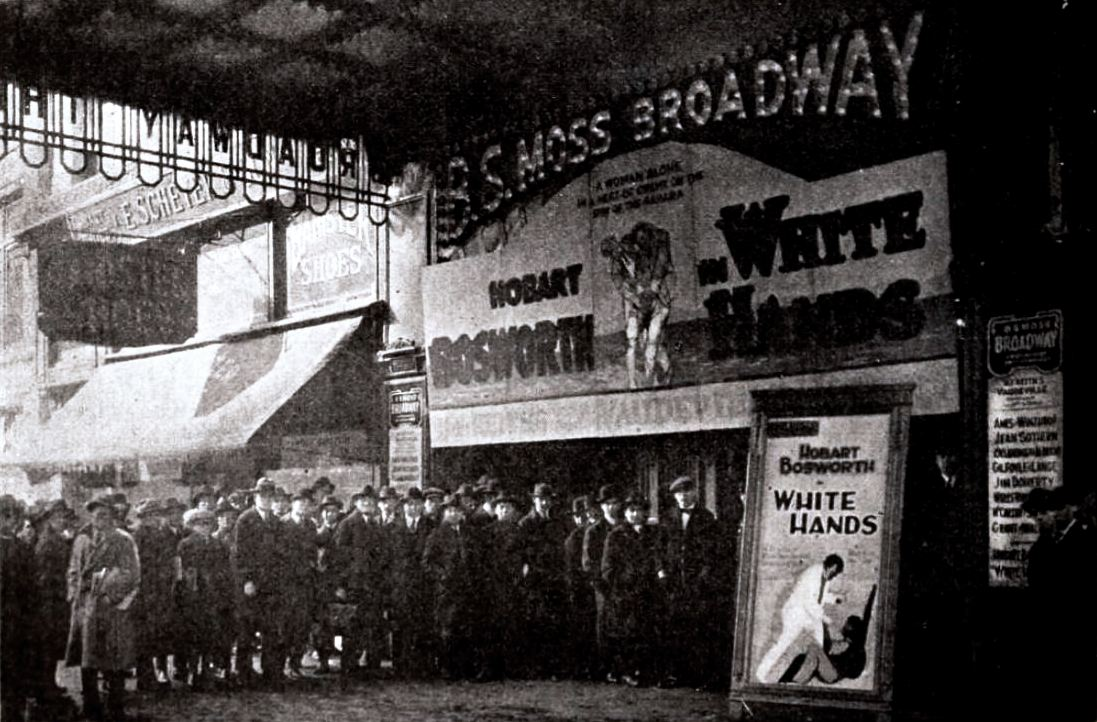
- B.S. Moss' Broadway Theatre showing White Hands
- Directed by: Lambert Hillyer
- Written by: Lambert Hillyer and C. Gardner Sullivan
- Produced by: Max Graf
- Starring: Hobart Bosworth; Robert McKim; Freeman Wood
- Cinematography: J. O. Taylor
- Production company: Graf Productions
- Distributed by: Wid Gunning, Inc.
- Release date: January 30, 1922
- Running time: 80 minutes
- Country: United States
- Language: English

White Hands is a 1922 American Melodrama film directed by Lambert Hillyer that was set in Algeria but filmed in a Studio in San Mateo, California and the Pacific beaches in San Francisco, California. The film stars Hobart Bosworth, Robert McKim, and Freeman Wood.

== Plot ==
Sea captain "Hurricane" Hardy searches for treasure in the Sahara Desert and encounters Helen Maitland, the last remaining member of a missionary group. He offers her protection and carries her to the coast, with the intention of claiming her for himself when she recuperates. At a rundown seacoast hotel, Helen befriends Ralph Alden, a young man fighting off addiction and despair, as well as a three-year-old orphan named "Peroxide" whom Leon Roche, the proprietor, is rearing. Hurricane Hardy decides to attack Helen, but the touch of the child's white hands fills him with shame and remorse. Hurricane reforms and adopts the child, leaving Helen free to rehabilitate Ralph, her new love.

== Cast ==
- Hobart Bosworth as "Hurricane" Hardy
- Robert McKim as Leon Roche
- Freeman Wood as Ralph Alden
- Al Kaufman as "Grouch" Murphy
- Muriel Frances Dana as Peroxide
- Elena Jurado as a local Arabian woman (uncredited)
- Elinor Fair as Helen Maitland
- George O'Brien as Sailor
