= Island of Doomed Men =

1940 American horror film by Charles Barton

- Directed by: Charles Barton
- Screenplay by: Robert Hardy Andrews (as Robert D. Andrews)
- Starring: Peter Lorre
- Cinematography: Benjamin Kline
- Edited by: James Sweeney
- Music by: Gerard Carbonara (uncredited)
- Color process: Black and white
- Production company: Columbia Pictures
- Distributed by: Columbia Pictures
- Release date: May 20, 1940
- Running time: 67 minutes
- Country: United States
- Language: English

Island of Doomed Men is a 1940 American crime horror film directed by Charles Barton and starring Peter Lorre.

== Plot ==
Stephen Danel lures paroled convicts to his isolated island where they are forced to work as slaves for life. Government agent Mark Sheldon (code name 64) allows himself to be convicted of a murder he did not commit so that he can spend time in prison and then be paroled to work on Danel's island. It turns out that Danel's beautiful wife, Lorraine Danel, is a prisoner too.

== Cast ==
- Peter Lorre as Stephen Danel
- Rochelle Hudson as Lorraine Danel
- Robert Wilcox as Mark Sheldon
- Don Beddoe as Brand
- George E. Stone as Siggy
- Kenneth MacDonald as Doctor
- Charles Middleton as Cort
- Stanley Brown as Eddie
- Earl Gunn as Mitchell
