= The Rage of Paris (1921 film) =

1921 film

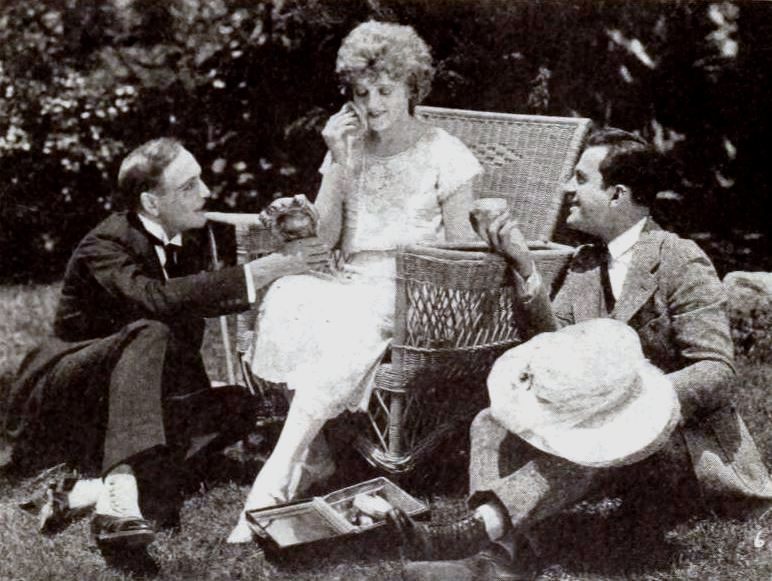
- Directed by: Jack Conway
- Written by: Douglas Z. Doty; Lucien Hubbard; Du Vernet Rabell
- Produced by: Carl Laemmle
- Starring: Miss DuPont; Elinor Hancock; Jack Perrin
- Cinematography: Harry Vallet
- Production company: Universal Pictures
- Distributed by: Universal Pictures
- Release date: September 25, 1921
- Running time: 5 reels
- Country: United States
- Languages: Silent; English intertitles

The Rage of Paris is a 1921 American silent drama film directed by Jack Conway and starring Miss DuPont, Elinor Hancock and Jack Perrin.

== Plot ==
Forced into a loveless marriage by her mother, Joan Coolidge, a beautiful American girl, finds her husband a brute. She runs away to Paris and studies dancing and becomes The Rage of Paris. Her portrait is hung in the art gallery. Her former sweetheart, a civil engineer fresh from conquests in Arabia, sees the portrait and finds her. When he goes to Arabia she follows. Her husband trails her across the ocean into the desert, but is killed by a half-crazed native during a sandstorm. Joan and her old lover are finally reunited.

== Cast ==
- Miss DuPont as Joan Coolidge
- Elinor Hancock as Mrs. Coolidge
- Jack Perrin as Gordon Talbut
- Leo White as Jean Marot
- Ramsey Wallace as Mortimer Handley
- Freeman Wood as Jimmy Allen
- Eve Southern as Mignonne Le Place
- Mathilde Brundage as Mme. Courtigny
- J.J. Lance as Mons. Dubet

== Bibliography ==
- James Robert Parish & Michael R. Pitts. Film directors: a guide to their American films. Scarecrow Press, 1974.
