= Elena Jurado =

Filipino-American Actress (1901–1974)

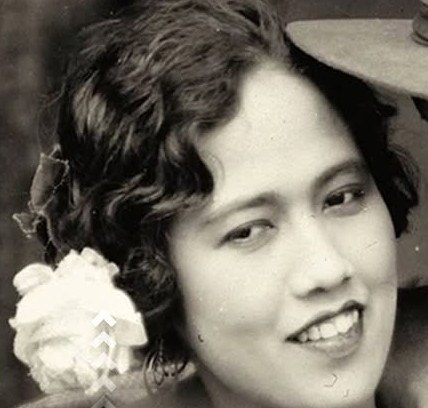
- Elena Jurado in 1927
- Born: May 19, 1901; Sibonga, Cebu, Philippines
- Died: May 19, 1974 (aged 73); Los Angeles, California, US
- Other names: Lena Jones; Lena Jurado Wingate "The Swede" "The Island Cinderella"
- Known for: First Filipina silent film actress in Hollywood

Elena Jurado (1901–1974) was a pioneering Asian-American actress working primarily in silent films during the 1920s. Upon her retirement from the film industry she became an educator. She is credited with being the first Southeast Asian actress to appear in Hollywood films.

== Early life ==
Jurado born on May 19, 1901, in Sibonga, Cebu, Philippines, to U.S. Army Sergeant Mark Lewis Jacobs and Placida Jurado. Her father, Mark Jacobs was a career military man in (Company H, 19th Military Regiment) working with the Signal Corps on telegraph communications during the Philippine-American War. Jacobs eventually attained the rank of colonel and served in World War I. Elena spent her developmental years at Camp Jossman, a military base on the island of Guimaras. There she attended school with children of U.S. Army and civil officers.

Jacobs left the Philippines in 1913 with his military unit, leaving Placida and Elena behind with Elena being sent to a convent school in Manila for a year. With the written consent of her mother, Elena was first married in 1914 to Ira Jones at San Agustin Church in Intramuros, Manila. Jurado departed the Philippines on May 20, 1919 with her husband bound for San Francisco. According to the 1920 census, the couple spent a short time in Georgetown, California near the gold fields, where Ira found work as an electrician. Shortly thereafter, they moved to San Francisco, California and she began to study radio communications. Jurado responded to a casting call in September 1921 to portray an Arabian woman in White Hands, a film set along the Algerian coast being produced by Max Graf. The film was being shot in a studio in San Mateo, California and along the Pacific shore beaches of San Francisco. As a result of an encounter on the set with lead actor Hobart Bosworth, (who would later become a director and film producer in his own right) he was able to convince Graf to hire her based upon her singing and dancing abilities demonstrated in her audition screen test. Bosworth also invited Jurado to audition for his own upcoming productions as well, thus beginning her career in film.

== Professional career ==
Jurado appeared in several bit parts in silent films in the 1920s, including White Hands in 1922, The Ten Commandments in 1923, What Price Glory? in 1926, Twenty Legs Under the Sea in 1927, A Girl in Every Port in 1928, and The Wedding March also in 1928. After the success of White Hands, Jurado spent several months in the Philippines in 1923 working with the Motion Picture Utility Corporation, a film financing business, to set up two motion pictures Sunshine and Shadow and Wings of Love that were planned to be shot in the Philippines, but the financing for these films failed to materialize. Jurado was the screenwriter for Wings of Love. Jurado's last known film was The Wedding March in 1928 where she played an escort in a Viennese brothel. After giving up acting, she engaged in some more screenwriting for a short time and eventually left the film industry altogether to become a kindergarten teacher and piano instructor in Southern California.

== Personal life ==
Jurado married twice, first in 1914 to Ira Otis Jones, a medic in the U.S. Army in the Philippines when she was age of 13, and then to Andrew James Wingate, an auto mechanic, in 1939 in California. She was eventually divorced from both of her husbands. Jurado first immigrated to the United States in June 1919 as a passenger aboard the USAT Sherman under the name Lena Jones with her husband Ira who was listed as "an ex-soldier," but she was identified in the passenger manifest as a nurse in the employ of the family of U.S. Army Major H.L. King. Jurado was naturalized as a United States citizen on March 28, 1922 as part of an application for a United States passport to travel as a tourist to Japan and China subsequent to the premiere of White Hands. Jurado was identified as a U.S. citizen by the Philippine Insular Government when she and Ira Jones departed Manila for San Francisco aboard the SS West Prospect on April 17, 1923 after their 11-month stay that included her two failed film productions. Jurado died on her 73rd birthday, May 19, 1974, in Los Angeles, California.
