= The Girl I Loved =

1923 film by Joe De Grasse

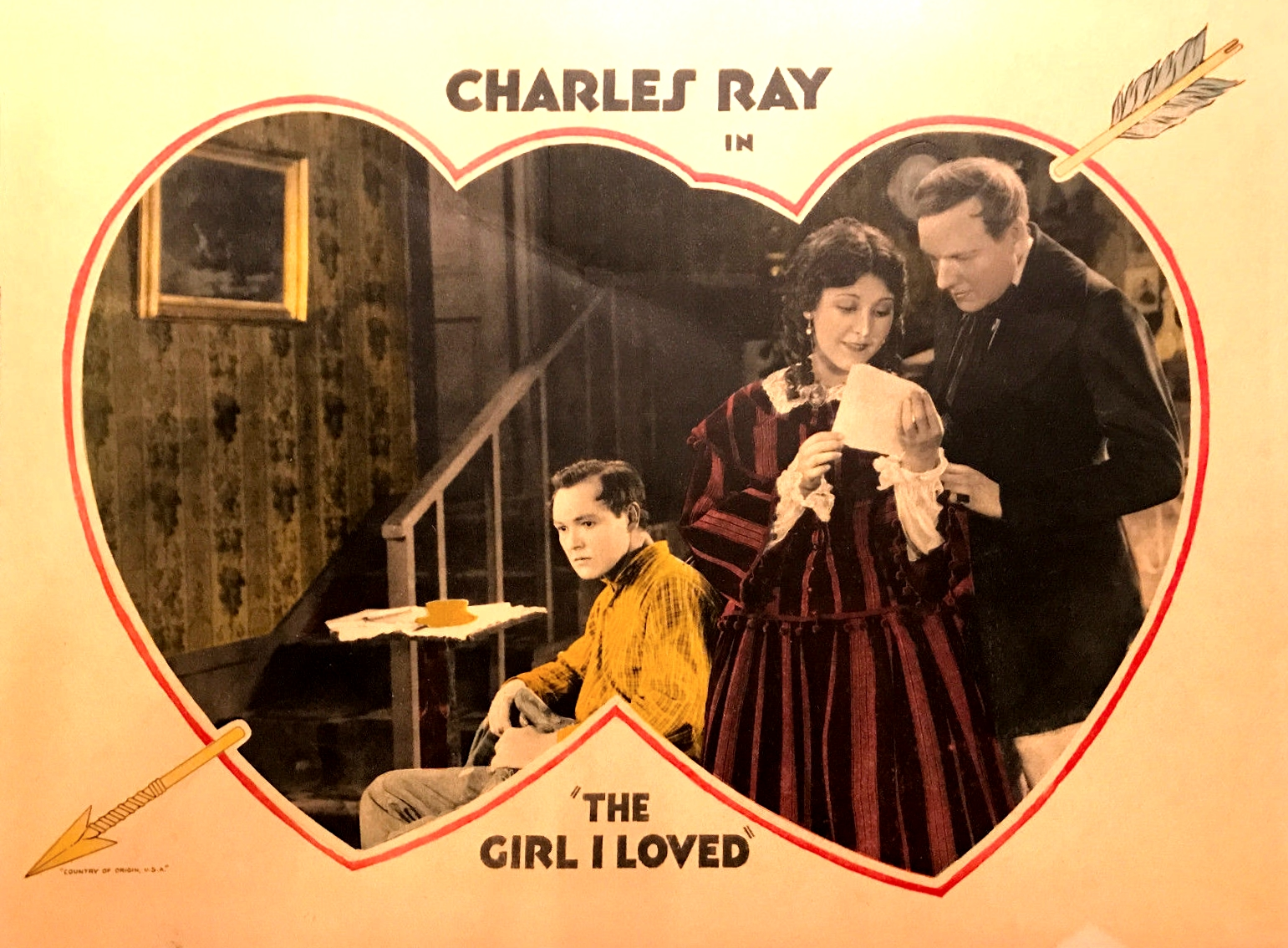
- Lobby card
- Directed by: Joseph De Grasse
- Screenplay by: Harry L. Decker; Albert Ray; Edward Withers
- Based on: The Girl I Loved by James Whitcomb Riley
- Produced by: Charles Ray
- Starring: Charles Ray; Patsy Ruth Miller; Ramsey Wallace; Edythe Chapman; William Courtright
- Cinematography: George Rizard
- Production company: Charles Ray Productions
- Distributed by: United Artists
- Release date: February 15, 1923
- Running time: 60 minutes
- Country: United States
- Language: Silent (English intertitles)

The Girl I Loved is a 1923 American silent drama film directed by Joseph De Grasse and written by Albert Ray. The film stars Charles Ray, Patsy Ruth Miller, Ramsey Wallace, Edythe Chapman and William Courtright. The film was released on February 15, 1923, by United Artists.

== Cast ==
- Charles Ray as John Middleton
- Patsy Ruth Miller as Mary
- Ramsey Wallace as Willie Brown
- Edythe Chapman as Mother Middleton
- William Courtright as Neighbor Silas Gregg
- Charlotte Woods as Betty Short
- Gus Leonard as Neighbor Perkins
- F.B. Phillips as Hired Man
- Lon Poff as Minister
- Jess Herring as Hiram Lang
- Ruth Bolgiano as Ruth Lang
- Edward Moncrief as The Judge
- George F. Marion as The Judge
- Billie Latimer as A Spinster

== Preservation ==
The film survives in complete at the property of Cinematheque Royale de Belgique and Gosfilmofond.
