= Ladies of the Big House =

1931 film

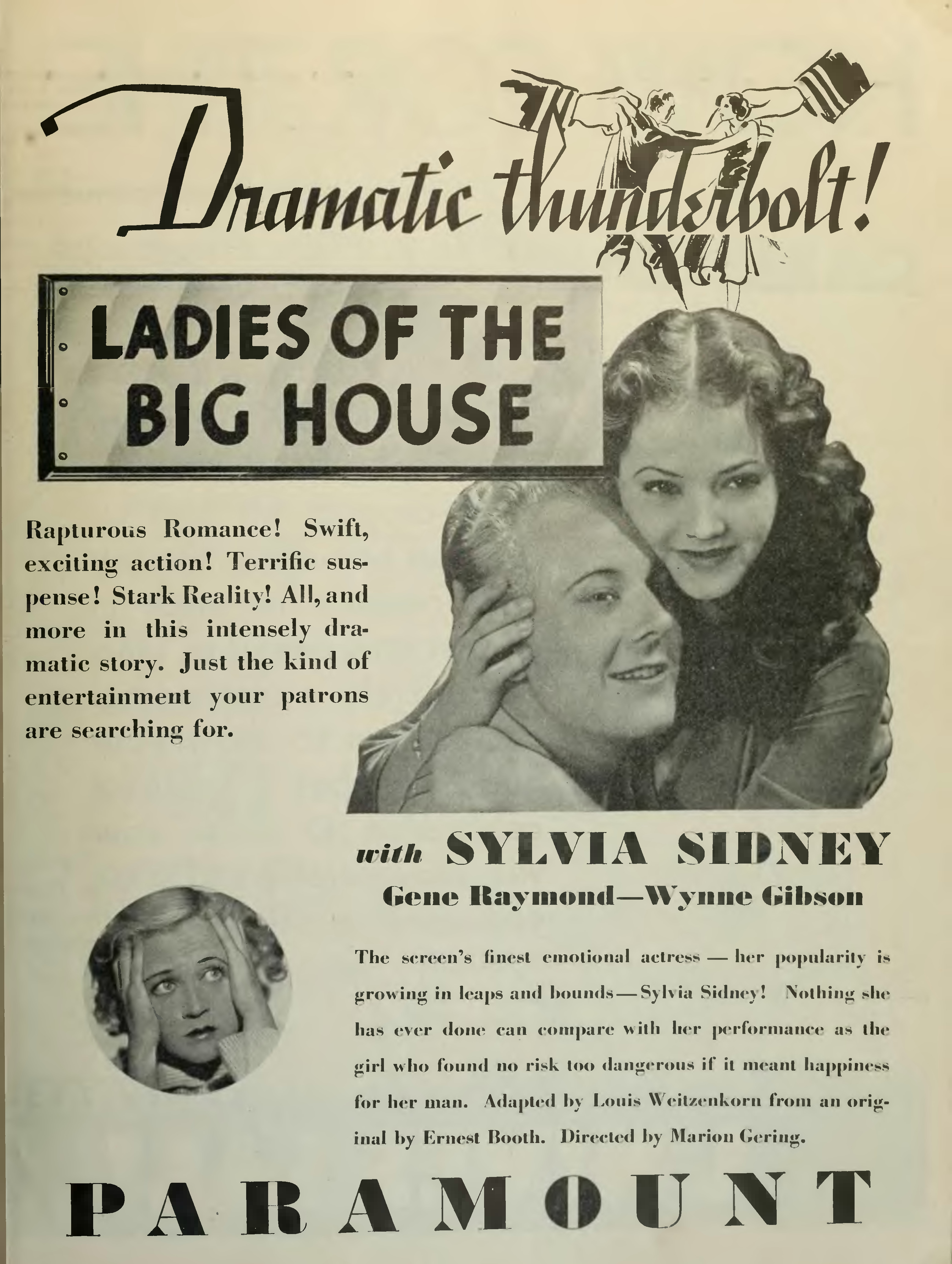
- Directed by: Marion Gering
- Screenplay by: Ernest Booth; William Slavens McNutt; Grover Jones
- Starring: Sylvia Sidney; Gene Raymond; Wynne Gibson; Earle Foxe; Rockliffe Fellowes; Purnell Pratt; Frank Sheridan
- Cinematography: John Leipold
- Edited by: David Abel
- Production company: Paramount Pictures
- Distributed by: Paramount Pictures
- Release date: December 26, 1931
- Running time: 77 minutes
- Country: United States
- Language: English

Ladies of the Big House is a 1931 American pre-Code drama film directed by Marion Gering and written by Ernest Booth, William Slavens McNutt and Grover Jones. The film stars Sylvia Sidney, Gene Raymond, Wynne Gibson, Earle Foxe, Rockliffe Fellowes, Purnell Pratt and Frank Sheridan. The film was released on December 26, 1931, by Paramount Pictures.

== Plot ==
Young florist Kathleen Storm is instantly the object of desire of a young man standing in front of the shopwindow, where she is arranging flowers. They have two wonderful weeks in their life together before they marry. The same day her criminal ex-boyfriend Kid Athens, who heard about her wedding, decides to frame her and her new husband. She and her husband Standish end up in prison. He is sentenced to death penalty on a charge of murder and she to a life sentence. In prison she meets a woman, Susie Thompson, who was Kid Athens' girlfriend before her, who after an initial raging jealousy ends up helping her to tell the authorities the truth about Kid Athens and she and her husband's innocence. Justice wins and the couple can finally have a honeymoon on a ship.

== Cast ==
- Sylvia Sidney as Kathleen Storm McNeil
- Gene Raymond as Standish McNeil
- Wynne Gibson as Susie Thompson
- Earle Foxe as Kid Athens
- Rockliffe Fellowes as Martin Doremus
- Purnell Pratt as John Hartman
- Frank Sheridan as Warden Hecker
- Louise Beavers as Ivory
- Miriam Goldina as Maria
- Hilda Vaughn as Millie
- Fritzi Ridgeway as Reno Maggie
- Esther Howard as Clara Newman
- Edna Bennett as The Countess
- Ruth Lyons as Gertie
- Jane Darwell as Mrs. Turner
- Mary Foy as Mrs. Lowry
- Noel Francis as Thelma
- Theodore von Eltz as Frazer
- Evelyn Preer as Inmate

== Critical reception ==
The New York Times gave a positive review that described the "realism" of the depiction of prison life, and wrote, "An atmosphere of shadows and desolation clings even to those scenes in which love is most plainly seen to be finding a way." The review praised the resolution of the plot, commenting that it represented "good melodrama of its type, fast and exciting" and complimented the performances, stating "Both Miss Sidney and Mr. Raymond give good, honest performances and their support, for the most part, is competent. Frank Sheridan is excellent as the kindly warden."

The Film Daily wrote, "Due to particularly good acting and judicious photography, along with very intelligent direction, this story of the woman's side of prison life maintains a strong tension despite its cheerless background." Louise Beavers was also acknowledged for providing occasional "comedy touches."

Harrison's Reports wrote that although some of the plot elements were unconvincing, the film was an "interesting, though depressing prison drama."

== See also ==
- The House That Shadows Built (1931) Paramount promotional film with excerpts of Ladies of the Big House
