= Ladies of the Mob =

1928 film

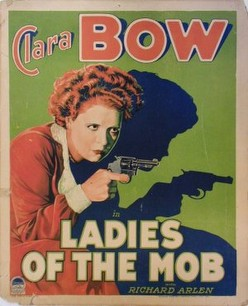
- 1928 theatrical poster
- Directed by: William A. Wellman
- Written by: Ernest Booth; John Farrow; Oliver H.P. Garrett; George Marion Jr.
- Produced by: William A. Wellman
- Starring: Clara Bow; Richard Arlen
- Cinematography: Henry W. Gerrard
- Edited by: Edgar Adams; Alyson Shaffer; E. Lloyd Sheldon
- Distributed by: Paramount Pictures
- Release date: June 17, 1928
- Running time: 70 minutes
- Country: United States
- Language: Silent (English intertitles)
- Budget: $221,000 (estimated)

Ladies of the Mob is a 1928 American silent crime drama film directed by William A. Wellman, produced by Jesse L. Lasky and Adolph Zukor for Famous Players–Lasky, and distributed by Paramount Pictures. The film is based on a story by Ernest Booth. This gangster-themed romantic thriller about a criminal's daughter who tries to reform a petty crook whom she loves featured Clara Bow, Richard Arlen, Mary Alden, and Helen Lynch.

The women's costumes were designed by Travis Banton and Edith Head, both of whom had long, distinguished careers in Hollywood.

== Cast ==
- Clara Bow as Yvonne
- Richard Arlen as Red
- Helen Lynch as Marie
- Mary Alden as Soft Annie
- Carl Gerard as Joe
- Bodil Rosing as The mother
- Lorraine Rivero as Little Yvonne
- James Pierce as The officer

== Censorship ==
When Ladies of the Mob was released, many states and cities in the United States had censor boards that could require cuts or other eliminations before the film could be shown. The Kansas censor board ordered the elimination of an intertitle with the caption, "Quit cacklin'. You ain't laid no egg."

== Preservation ==
With no prints of Ladies of the Mob located in any film archives, it is a lost film.

== See also ==
- List of lost films
