= Dude Ranch (film) =

1931 American Western film by Frank Tuttle

- Lobby card
- Directed by: Frank Tuttle
- Screenplay by: Milton Krims; Percy Heath; Grover Jones; Lloyd Corrigan
- Produced by: Adolph Zukor
- Starring: Jack Oakie; Stuart Erwin; Eugene Pallette; Mitzi Green; June Collyer; Charles Sellon; Cecil Weston
- Cinematography: Henry W. Gerrard
- Production company: Paramount Pictures
- Distributed by: Paramount Pictures
- Release date: May 16, 1931
- Running time: 71 minutes
- Country: United States
- Language: English

Dude Ranch is a 1931 American pre-Code Western film directed by Frank Tuttle and written by Milton Krims, Percy Heath, Grover Jones and Lloyd Corrigan. The film stars Jack Oakie, Stuart Erwin, Eugene Pallette, Mitzi Green, June Collyer, Charles Sellon and Cecil Weston. The film was released on May 16, 1931, by Paramount Pictures.

== Cast ==
- Jack Oakie as Jennifer / Vance Kilroy
- Stuart Erwin as Chester Carr
- Eugene Pallette as Judd / Black Jed
- Mitzi Green as Alice Merridew
- June Collyer as Susan Meadows
- Charles Sellon as Spruce Meadows
- Cecil Weston as Mrs. Merridew
- George Webb as Burson
- Guy Oliver as Simonson
- James Crane as Blaze Denton
