= Big Brown Eyes =

1936 film by Raoul Walsh

- Theatrical release poster
- Directed by: Raoul Walsh
- Screenplay by: Bert Hanlon; Raoul Walsh
- Based on: "Hahsit Babe" "Big Brown Eyes"; 1935 Liberty magazine stories by James Edward Grant
- Produced by: Walter Wanger
- Starring: Cary Grant; Joan Bennett; Walter Pidgeon
- Cinematography: George T. Clemens
- Edited by: Robert L. Simpson
- Music by: Gerard Carbonara
- Production company: Walter Wanger Productions
- Distributed by: Paramount Pictures
- Release date: April 3, 1936
- Running time: 77 minutes
- Country: United States
- Language: English
- Budget: $289,696
- Box office: $359,009

Big Brown Eyes is a 1936 American mystery crime comedy film directed by Raoul Walsh and starring Cary Grant, Joan Bennett and Walter Pidgeon. It was produced by Walter Wanger and distributed by Paramount Pictures.

== Plot ==
Police officer Danny Barr is chasing jewel robbers. His girlfriend, Eve Fallon, is initially working as a manicurist, but quickly takes a job as a reporter assisting in the effort against the jewel thieves. Fallon and Barr become disgusted when one jewel gang member is acquitted after killing a baby in Central Park, and both leave their jobs. Soon thereafter, Fallon gets a lucky break while giving a manicure and the case is solved.

== Cast ==
- Cary Grant as Det. Sgt. Danny Barr
- Joan Bennett as Eve Fallon
- Walter Pidgeon as Richard Morey
- Lloyd Nolan as Russ Cortig
- Alan Baxter as Cary Butler
- Marjorie Gateson as Mrs. Chesley Cole
- Isabel Jewell as Bessie Blair
- Douglas Fowley as Benjamin 'Benny' Battle
- Henry Brandon as Don Butler
- Joe Sawyer as Jack Scully

== Reception ==
The film recorded a loss of $14,645. Critics have regarded it as "disposable" and "inconsequential" with "shoddy writing and generally uninspired performances."

Writing for The Spectator in 1936, Graham Greene gave the film a positive review, characterizing it as "a fast well-directed and quite unsentimental gangster film, pleasantly free from emotion".

More recent writers have been kinder to the film. Grant biographer Scott Eyman called it an "unheralded gem in Grant's catalogue, a snappy comedy-drama [...] a cheerfully disreputable pre-Code film unaccountably made after the Code, with speedy cross-talk that prefigures His Girl Friday." Writing for The New Yorker, Richard Brody hailed the film's "cocksure grifters and workaday wiseacres who dish out sharp-edged patter—none more than Grant and Bennett, whose gibing often resembles quasi-Beckettian doubletalk. Here, Grant offers early flashes of the brash, suave, and intricate antics on which his enduring comedic persona is based."
