= Chinatown Nights (1929 film) =

1929 film

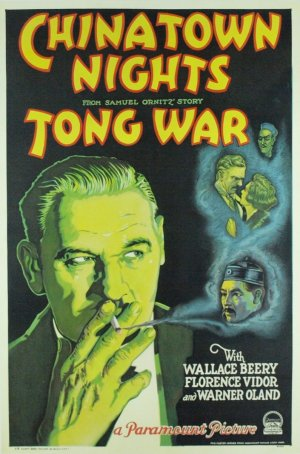
- Directed by: William A. Wellman
- Written by: Samuel Ornitz (story); Ben Grauman Kohn; Oliver H.P. Garrett; William B. Jutte
- Produced by: David O. Selznick
- Starring: Wallace Beery; Florence Vidor; Warner Oland; Jack Oakie
- Cinematography: Henry W. Gerrard
- Edited by: Alyson Shaffer
- Music by: Max Bergunker; Gerard Carbonara; Karl Hajos (all uncredited)
- Distributed by: Paramount Pictures
- Release date: March 30, 1929
- Running time: 83 minutes
- Country: United States
- Language: English

Chinatown Nights, also known as Tong War, is a 1929 film starring Wallace Beery. It started production as a silent film, but finished as an all-talking sound one via dubbing.

Directed by William A. Wellman and released by Paramount Pictures, Chinatown Nights also stars Florence Vidor, the former wife of director King Vidor

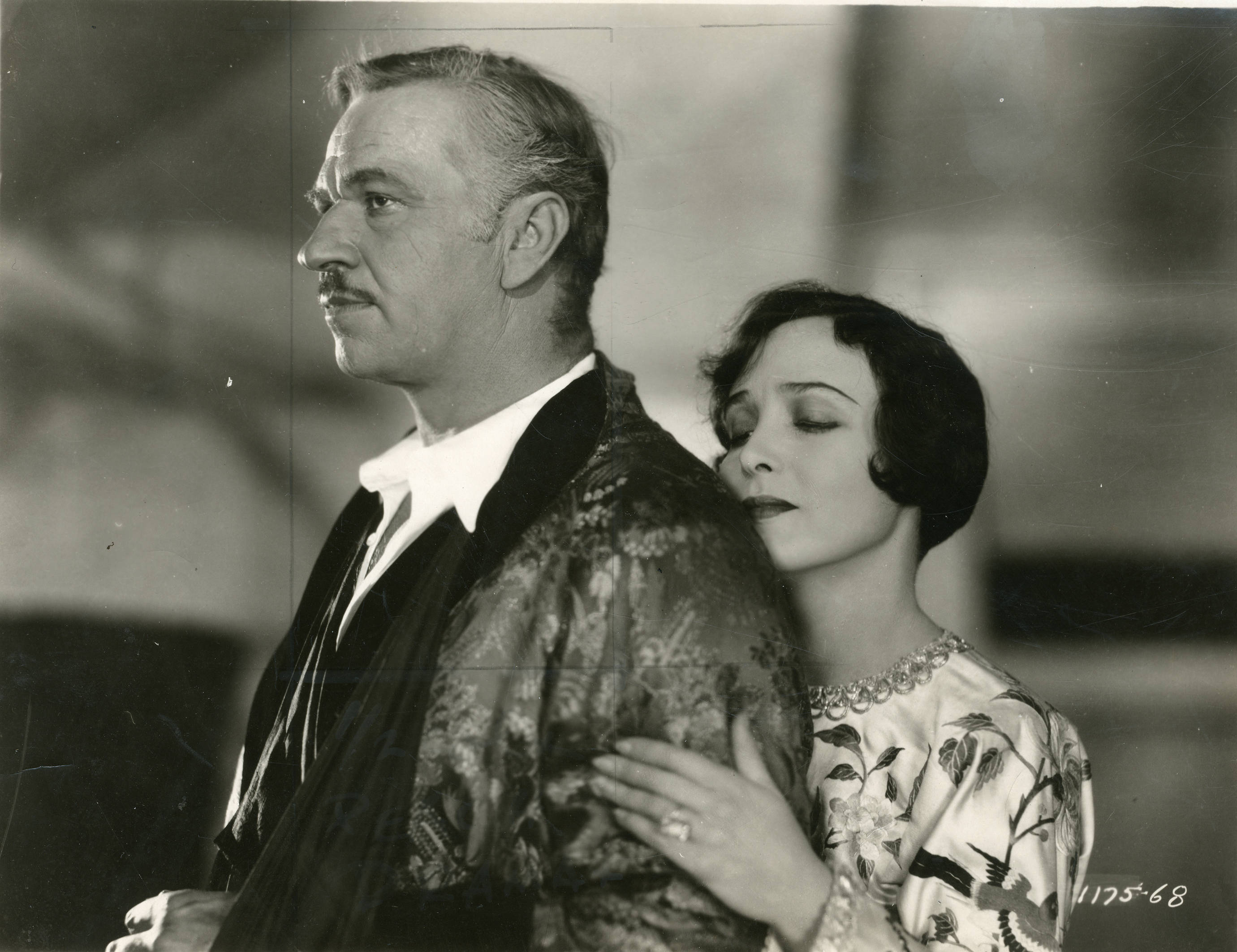
Wallace Beery and Florence Vidor

== Plot ==
Joan Fay is a society lady taking a bus tour of the Chinatown in her city. As the tourists are walking around one stop, a fight suddenly starts between two rival Chinese tong societies. The tourists rush back on the bus, which then drives away. In the confusion, it leaves Joan behind.

Chuck Riley is the Irish leader of one of the tongs and the owner of a dance hall. When he sees Joan, he takes her away from the fight to shelter at his apartment for the night. She goes home the next morning. She later returns to Chinatown with some friends. Chuck has to rescue her a second time. Joan falls in love with him and moves into his apartment. She tries to reform Chuck's criminal activities, leading to arguments that result in him evicting her

Joan then wanders the streets and encounters Chuck's tong rival, Boston Charley. He gets her intoxicated and sends her back to Chuck with a humiliating letter pinned to her sweater. Moved by Joan's condition, Chuck destroys his dance hall and leaves the tong. Joan and Chuck leave Chinatown looking for a new beginning.

== Cast ==
- Wallace Beery as Chuck Riley
- Florence Vidor as Joan Fry (voice dubbed by Nella Walker)
- Warner Oland as Boston Charley
- Jack McHugh as the Shadow
- Jack Oakie as the Reporter

== Production ==
Florence Vidor did not dub her own voice in Chinatown Nights; it was supplied by actress Nella Walker. The supporting cast includes Warner Oland as a gangster and Jack Oakie as a reporter. The movie was based upon the story "Tong War" by Samuel Ornitz.

During the filming of Chinatown Nights as a silent feature, Paramount abruptly stopped production so that they could convert it into a sound film A dialogue script was quickly prepared, and sound technicians and equipment arrived on the set.”

Film historian Scott Eyman reports that director Wellman clashed with the soundmen over the positioning of the overhead microphone during a tracking shot involving Wallace Berry and Florence Vidor. Technicians insisted that the actors stop whenever they spoke, interrupting the camera motion. Frustrated, Wellman commandeered the microphone. Holding it in his lap on the tracking platform, he aimed it at the actors and proceeded with the shoot; the audio proved satisfactory.

Eyman notes that Wellman "received no credit for the innovation" of the "shotgun microphone" but utilized this method with “extraordinary virtuosity” in the boxing drama The Man I Love (1929).

== See also ==
- List of early sound feature films (1926–1929)
- Filmography of Wallace Beery
