= Woman Trap (1929 film) =

1929 film

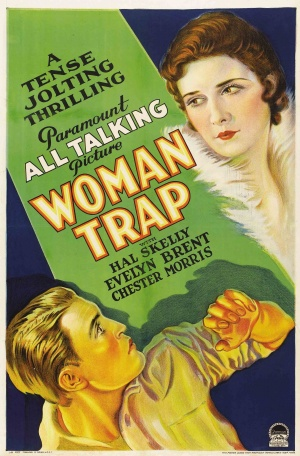
- Film poster
- Directed by: William A. Wellman
- Written by: Edwin J. Burke (play); Bartlett Cormack; Louise Long
- Starring: Evelyn Brent
- Cinematography: Henry W. Gerrard
- Edited by: Alyson Shaffer
- Music by: Karl Hajos
- Distributed by: Paramount Pictures
- Release date: September 28, 1929
- Running time: 82 minutes
- Country: United States
- Language: English

Full film

Woman Trap is a 1929 American drama film directed by William A. Wellman and starring Evelyn Brent. The film is focused in a four cornered love between captain Dan Malone (Hal Skelly), Kitty Evans (Evelyn Brent) and his good for nothing brother Ray Malone (Chester Morris). It was adapted from the play, "Brothers," by Edwin J. Burke.

== Plot ==
Dan, a tough police captain, and Ray, a hardened criminal, are estranged brothers. When Ray faces capture, Kitty, the sister of Ray's ex-partner (whom Dan helped to convict), offers to help him escape because she sees an opportunity for revenge against Dan. She notifies the police and Dan of Ray's whereabouts, regretting her actions too late to prevent their capture. To avert arrest by his brother, Ray commits suicide. Kitty consoles Dan in his grief, and they come to an understanding over Ray's body.

== Cast ==
- Hal Skelly as Dan Malone
- Chester Morris as Ray Malone
- Evelyn Brent as Kitty Evans
- William B. Davidson as Watts
- Effie Ellsler as Mrs. Malone
- Guy Oliver as Mr. Evans
- Leslie Fenton as Eddie Evans
- Charles Giblyn as Smith
- Joseph L. Mankiewicz as Reporter
- Clarence Wilson as Detective Captain
- Sailor Vincent as himself - a boxer
- Virginia Bruce as Nurse

== See also ==
- List of early sound feature films (1926–1929)
