= Her Only Way =

1918 film by Sidney Franklin

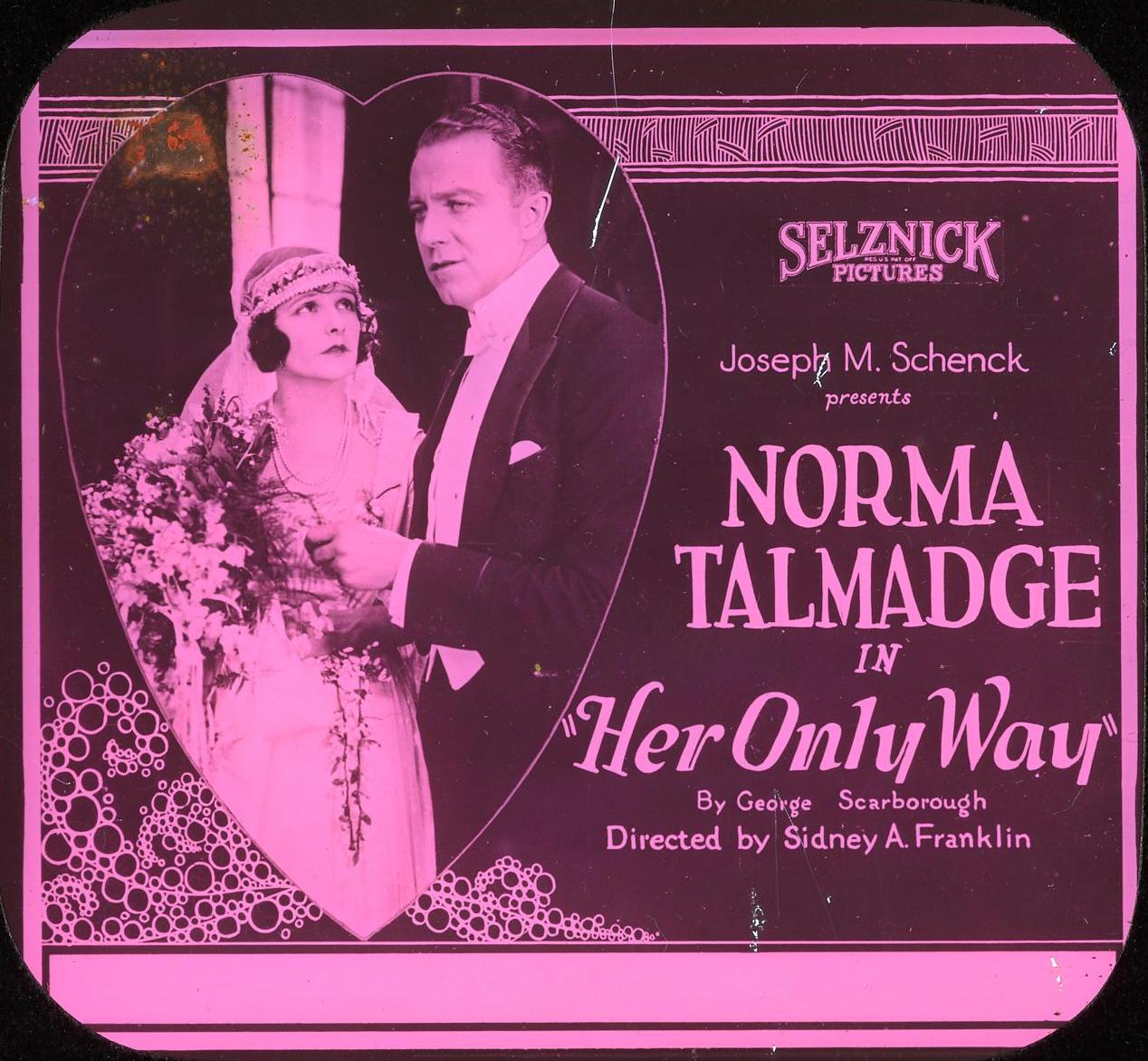
- Lantern slide for the film
- Directed by: Sidney Franklin
- Written by: George Scarborough (story); Mary Murillo (writer)
- Produced by: Joseph M. Schenck; Norma Talmadge
- Starring: Norma Talmadge
- Cinematography: Albert Moses; Edward Wynard
- Distributed by: Select Pictures
- Release date: August 18, 1918
- Running time: 72 minutes
- Country: USA
- Language: Silent with English titles

Her Only Way is a 1918 American silent drama film directed by Sidney Franklin with Norma Talmadge as the star.

== Cast ==
- Norma Talmadge - Lucille Westbrook
- Eugene O'Brien - Joseph Marshall
- Ramsey Wallace - Paul Belmont
- E. Alyn Warren - Judge Hampton Bates
- Jobyna Howland - Mrs. Randolph

== Preservation status ==
A copy of the film is held by Archives du Film du CNC in Bois d'Arcy.
