= Men of San Quentin =

1942 film by William Beaudine

- Directed by: William Beaudine
- Written by: Martin Mooney (story); Ernest Booth (screenplay)
- Produced by: Max King; Martin Mooney
- Starring: See below
- Cinematography: Clark Ramsey
- Edited by: Dan Milner
- Production company: Producers Releasing Corporation
- Distributed by: Producers Releasing Corporation
- Release date: May 15, 1942
- Running time: 80 minutes
- Country: United States
- Language: English

Men of San Quentin is a 1942 American crime drama film directed by William Beaudine.

== Cast ==
- J. Anthony Hughes as Jack Holden
- Eleanor Stewart as Anne Holden
- Dick Curtis as Butch Mason
- Charles B. Middleton as Saunderson
- Jeffrey Sayre as Jimmy
- George P. Breakston as Louie Howard
- Art Mills as Big Al
- Michael Mark as Mike, Convict in Ravine
- John Ince as Board Chairman
- Joe Whitehead as Joe Williams
- John 'Skins' Miller as Convict Skins Miller
- John Shay as Phone Guard
- Jack Cheatham as Court Gate Guard
- Drew Demorest as Guard Gaines
- Nancy Evans as Mrs. Doakes
- Ted R. Standish as Prison Department of Music Supervisor Ted R. Standish
- John A. Hendricks as Prison Orchestra Conductor John A. Hendricks
- G. Rolph Burr as Prison Broadcast Announcer G. Rolph Burr
- Jack Reavis as Prison Glee Club Director Jack Reavis
- Carl C. Hocker as San Quentin Prison Guard Carl C. Hocker

== Production ==
The production was granted permission to film inside San Quentin State Prison, with filming beginning in early March, 1942.

== Release ==
An April 11, 1942 preview of Men of San Quentin was held at San Quentin State Prison for the convicts and press.
