= Her Beloved Villain =

1920 film directed by Sam Wood

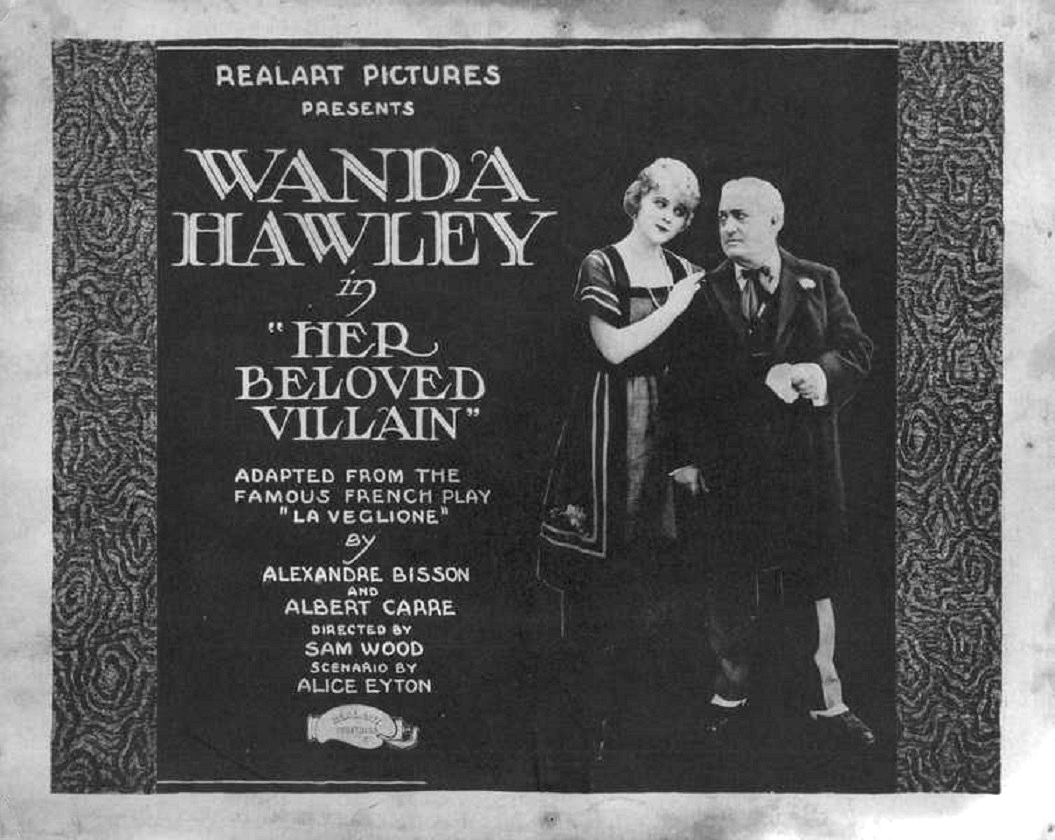
- Lobby card
- Directed by: Sam Wood
- Screenplay by: Alice Eyton
- Based on: La Veglione (Le bal masque) by Alexandre Bisson; Albert Carré
- Starring: Wanda Hawley; Ramsey Wallace; Templar Powell; Tully Marshall; Lillian Leighton; Gertrude Claire
- Cinematography: Alfred Gilks
- Production company: Realart Pictures Corporation
- Distributed by: Realart Pictures Corporation
- Release date: December 10, 1920
- Running time: 50 minutes
- Country: United States
- Language: English

Her Beloved Villain is a 1920 American silent comedy film directed by Sam Wood and written by Alice Eyton. The film stars Wanda Hawley, Ramsey Wallace, Templar Powell, Tully Marshall, Lillian Leighton and Gertrude Claire. The film was released on December 10, 1920, by Realart Pictures Corporation.

== Cast ==
- Wanda Hawley as Suzanne Bergamot
- Ramsey Wallace as Paul Blythe
- Templar Powell as Louis Martinot
- Tully Marshall as Dr. Joseph Poulard
- Lillian Leighton as Madame Poulard
- Gertrude Claire as Susanne's Aunt
- Robert Bolder as Monsieur Bergomat
- Margaret McWade as Madame Bergomat
- Harrison Ford as Martinot
- Irma Coonly as Rose
- Jay Peters as Casimer

== Preservation ==
Her Beloved Villain is currently presumed lost. In February of 2021, the film was cited by the National Film Preservation Board on their Lost U.S. Silent Feature Films list.
