= Ramsey Wallace =

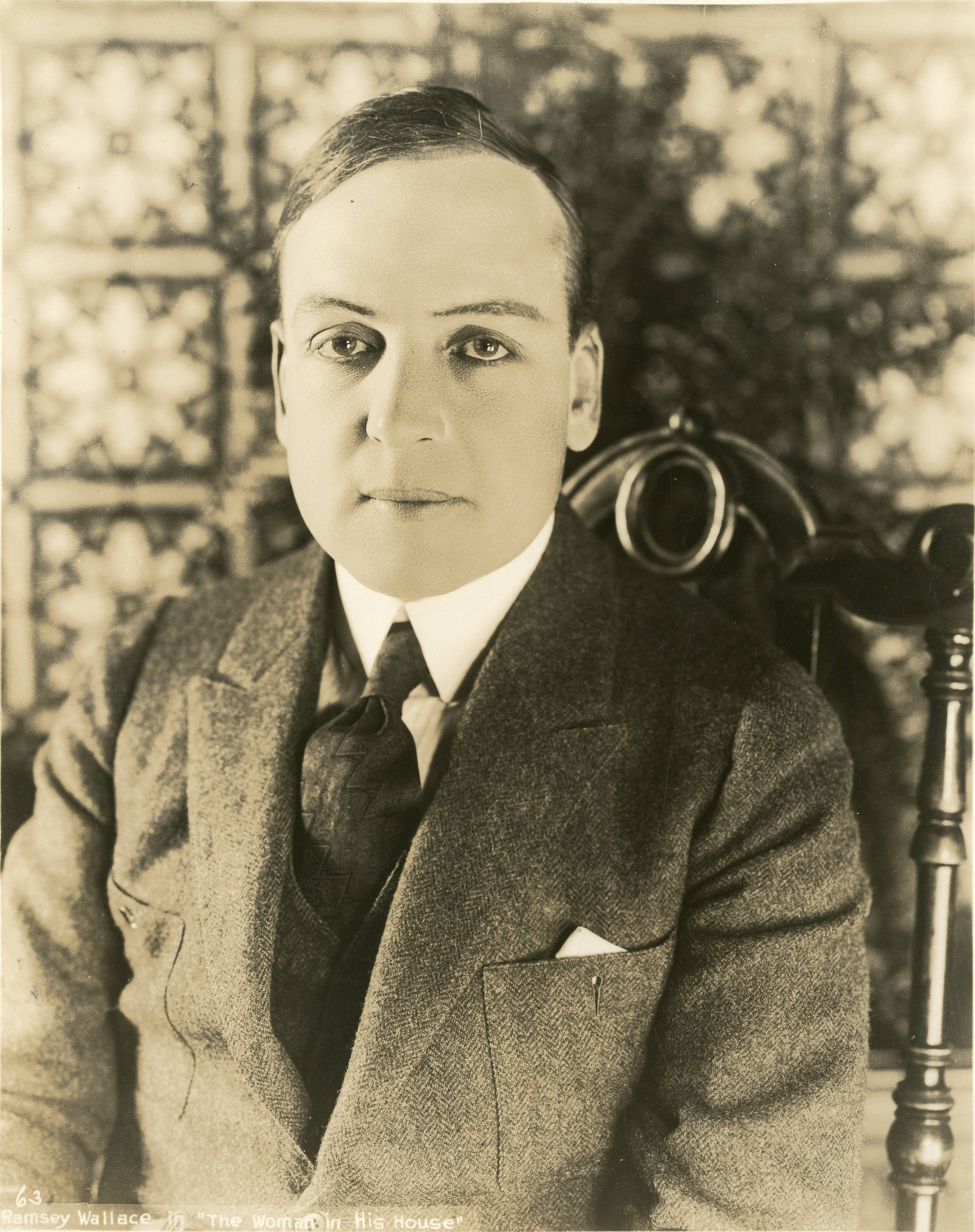
- Died: 1933

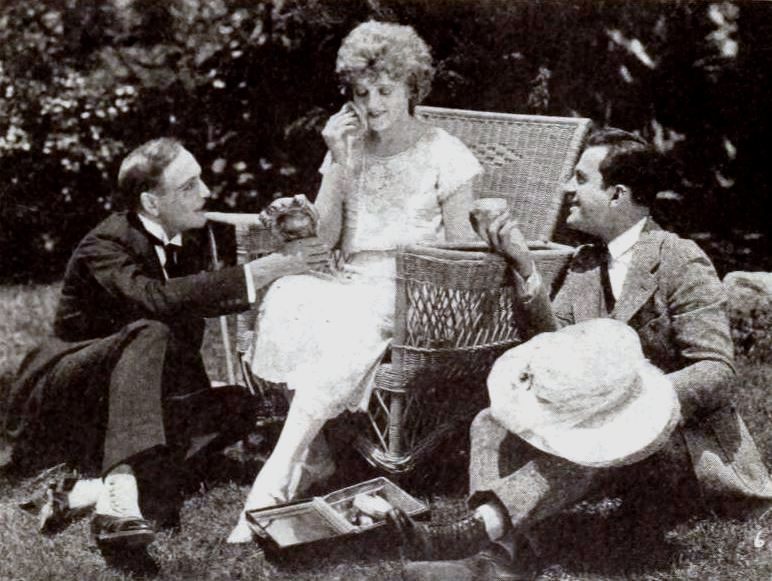
Ramsey Wallace, Miss DuPont (doing her make-up), and Jack Perrin on set in The Rage of Paris (1921)

Ramsey Wallace (1883–1933) was an actor in silent films. His work included leading roles. He starred in A Voice in the Dark. He received a favorable review for his leading role in The Call of Home.

He worked as a promoter after his film career and died of a brain tumor in 1933.

== Selected filmography ==
- Her Only Way (1918)
- The Grain of Dust (1918)
- Her Beloved Villain (1920)
- The Woman in His House (1920)
- The Rage of Paris (1921)
- A Voice in the Dark (1921)
- The Call of Home (1921)
- Luring Lips (1921)
- Little Wildcat (1922)
- Human Hearts (1922)
- The Call of Home (1922)
- The Girl I Loved (1923)
- The Drivin' Fool (1923)
- Gossip (1923)
- The Little Wildcat (1923)
- The Extra Girl (1923)
- Broken Laws (1924)
- Empty Hands (1924)
- Chalk Marks (1924)
