= Jack Oakie =

American actor (1903–1978)

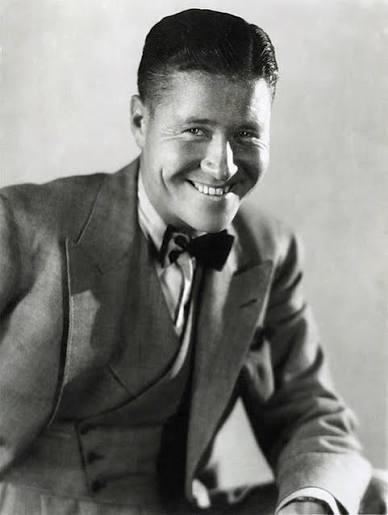
- Oakie in 1930
- Born: Lewis Delaney Offield; November 12, 1903; Sedalia, Missouri, U.S.
- Died: January 23, 1978 (aged 74); Los Angeles, California, U.S.
- Resting place: Forest Lawn Memorial Park (Glendale)
- Occupation: Actor
- Years active: 1923–1971
- Spouses: Venita Varden (m. 1936; div. 1945) Victoria Horne (m. 1950)

Jack Oakie (born Lewis Delaney Offield; November 12, 1903 – January 23, 1978) was an American actor, starring mostly in films, but also working on stage, radio and television. He portrayed Napaloni in Chaplin's The Great Dictator (1940), receiving a nomination for the Academy Award for Best Supporting Actor.

== Early life ==
Jack Oakie was born in Sedalia, Missouri, at 522 W. Seventh St. His father, James Madison Offield (1880–1939), was a grain dealer, and his mother, Evelyn Offield (nee Jump; 1868–1939), was a psychology teacher. When he was five, the Offield family moved to Muskogee, Oklahoma, the source of his "Oakie" nickname. His adopted first name, Jack, was the name of the first character he played on stage. Young Lewis/Jack grew up mostly in Oklahoma but also lived for periods of time with his grandmother in Kansas City, Missouri. While there he attended Woodland Elementary and made spending money as a paperboy for The Kansas City Star. He recalled years later that he made especially good money selling "extras" in November 1916 during the presidential election campaign that resulted in Woodrow Wilson's re-election.

== Early career ==
Oakie worked as a runner on Wall Street and narrowly escaped being killed in the Wall Street bombing of September 16, 1920. While in New York, he also started appearing in amateur theatre as a mimic and a comedian, finally making his professional debut on Broadway in 1923 as a chorus boy in a production of Little Nellie Kelly by George M. Cohan.

Oakie worked in various musicals and comedies on Broadway from 1923 to 1927, when he moved to Hollywood to work in movies at the end of the silent film era. Oakie appeared in five silent films during 1927 and 1928. As the age of the "talkies" began, he signed with Paramount Pictures in 1927. He made his first talking film, The Dummy, in 1929.

== Film career ==
When his contract with Paramount ended in 1934, Oakie decided to freelance. He was remarkably successful, appearing in 87 films, most made in the 1930s and 1940s. In the film Too Much Harmony (1933), the part of Oakie's on-screen mother was played by his real mother, Mary Evelyn Offield. During the 1930s, he was known as "The World's Oldest Freshman", as a result of appearing in numerous films with a collegiate theme. He was also known for refusing to wear screen make-up of any kind, and the frequent use of double-take in his comedy. Oakie was quoted as saying of his studio career:

The pictures I made were called the bread and butter pictures of the studio. They cost nothing and made millions, and supported the prestige productions that cost millions and made nothing.

Oakie portrayed Benzino Napaloni, the boisterous dictator of Bacteria, in Charlie Chaplin's The Great Dictator (1940), for which he received an Oscar nomination for Best Supporting Actor. This role was a broad parody of the fascist dictator of Italy, Benito Mussolini, then in power.

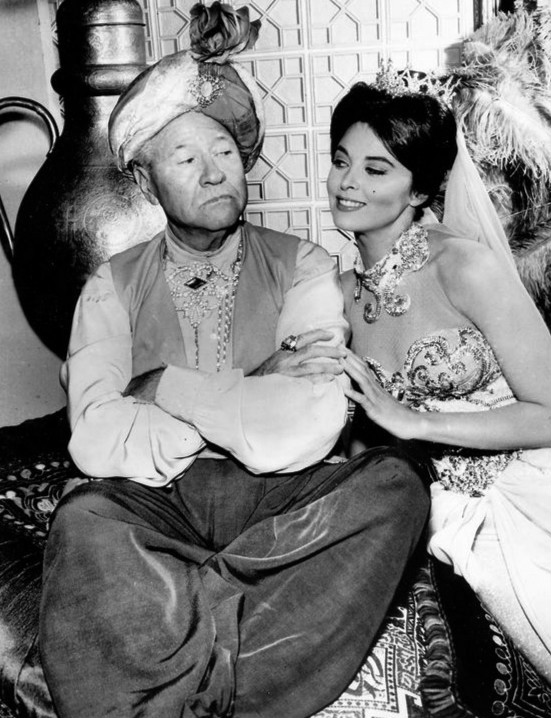
With Tina Louise in The New Breed TV series, 1961.

=== Television and radio ===
Not being limited by a film studio contract, Oakie branched into radio and had his own CBS musical-comedy radio series, Jack Oakie's College, between 1936 and 1938.

Late in his career he appeared in various episodes of a number of television shows, including The Real McCoys (1963, three times as Uncle Rightly), Breaking Point (Episode #22 "A Child of the Center Ring", 1964), Daniel Boone (1966), and Bonanza (1966).

== Personal life ==
Oakie was married twice. His first marriage to Venita Varden in 1936 ended in 1938 when Venita got an interlocutory decree of divorce. They reconciled, but finally divorced in 1944. She died in 1948 in the crash of United Airlines Flight 624 at Mount Carmel, Pennsylvania.

Oakie's second marriage was in 1950, to actress Victoria Horne, with whom he lived at "Oakridge" until his death in 1978.

Oakie died on January 23, 1978, in Los Angeles, California, at the age of 74 from an aortic aneurysm. His remains were interred at Forest Lawn Memorial Park, Glendale in Los Angeles County.

=== Oakridge estate ===
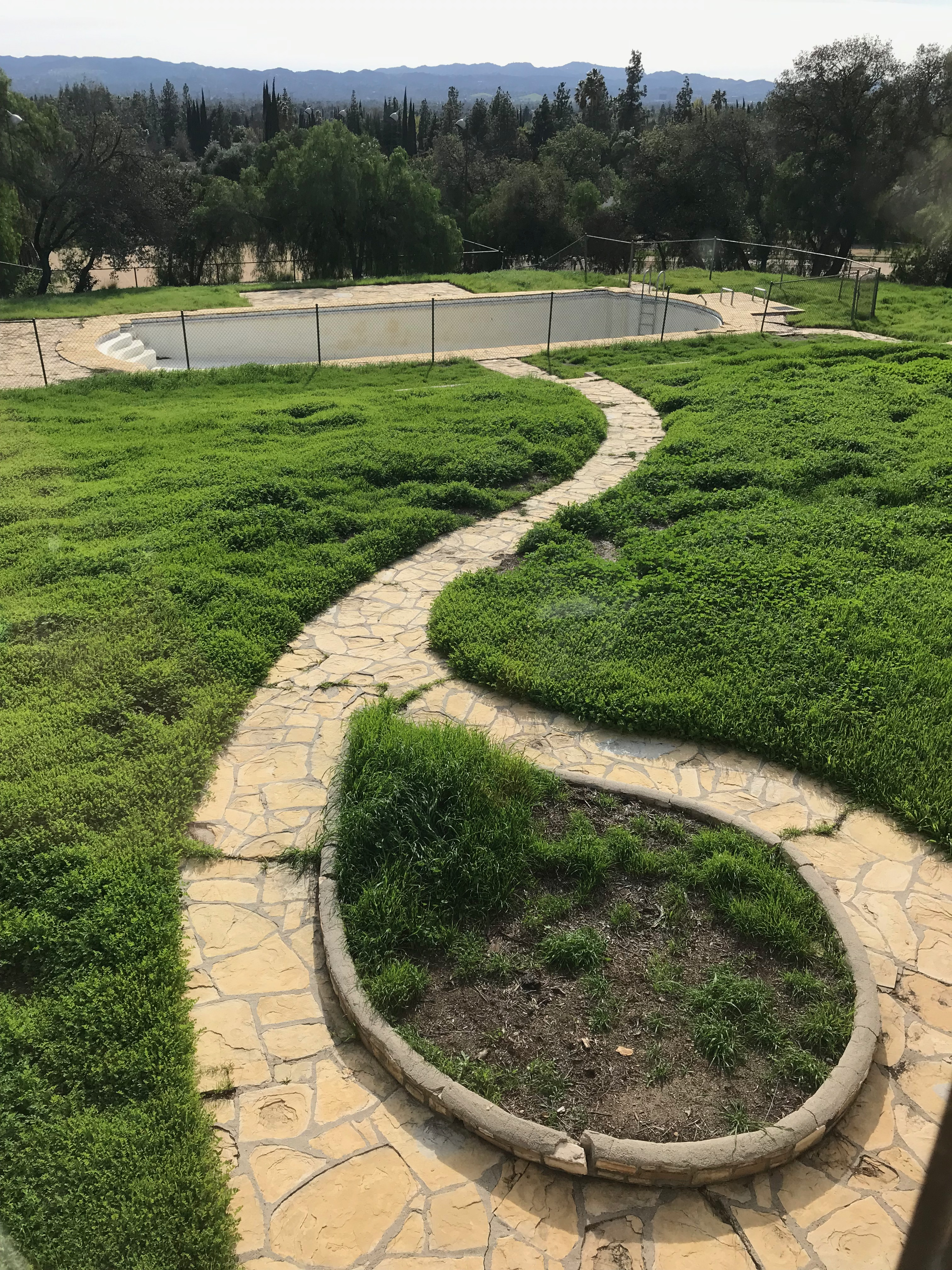
Pool at the Oakridge Estate.

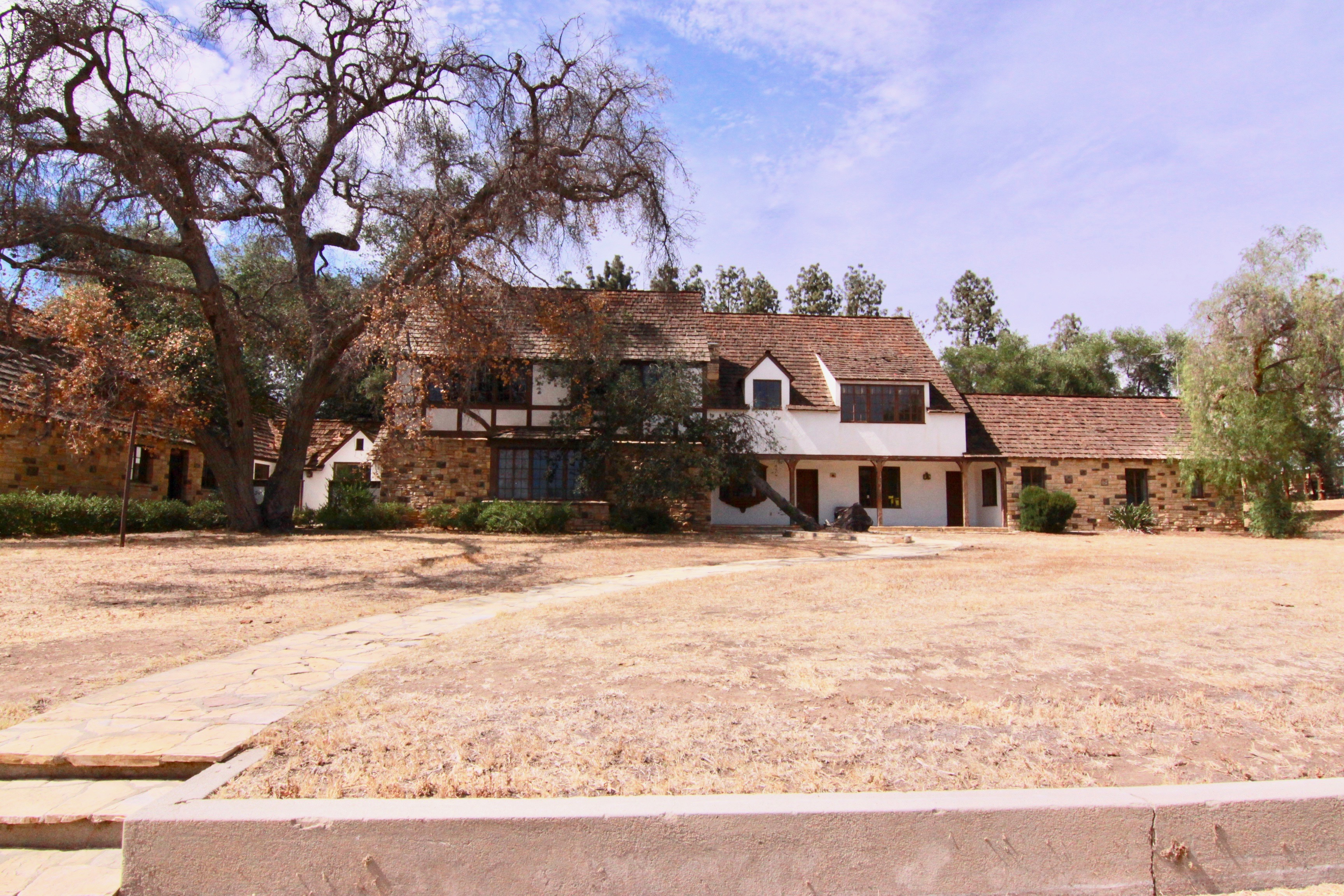
Back view of the Oakridge Estate in Northridge, CA.

Jack and Victoria Oakie lived their entire married life at "Oakridge", their 11-acre (4.5 ha) estate at 18650 Devonshire Street in Northridge, a suburb of Los Angeles in the San Fernando Valley. They acquired the former "Marwyck" estate of actress Barbara Stanwyck in 1940. Stanwyck commissioned the original residence designed by Paul Williams. Oakie planted a citrus orchard and bred Afghan Hounds, at one time having up to 100 dogs on the property.

Victoria Oakie continued to live there after her husband's death and bequeathed the estate to the University of Southern California, which sold it to developers. After two failed attempts to develop the property, Oakridge was acquired by the City of Los Angeles in December 2009. Oakridge is considered to be one of the last remnants of the large Northridge equestrian estates, famed for former thoroughbred breeding. The city plans to use the property as a park and community event center. The Paul Williams house and the grounds are Los Angeles Historic-Cultural Monument #484.

== Legacy ==
In 1981, the "Jack Oakie Lecture on Comedy in Film" was established as an annual event of the Academy of Motion Picture Arts and Sciences. At the inaugural presentation, Oakie was described as "a master of comic timing and a beloved figure in the industry."

The Jack Oakie Endowed Chair in Comedy at the School of Cinematic Arts at the University of Southern California was established in 2003.

Jack Oakie's star on the Hollywood Walk of Fame is at 6752 Hollywood Boulevard, and his hand and footprints can be found at Grauman's Chinese Theater in Hollywood.

A small display celebrating the comedy and fame of Jack Oakie is at Motion Picture & Television Country House and Hospital in Woodland Hills, California. There is also a display case of his personal effects, jewelry, etc. at the Valley Relics Museum in Van Nuys, California. There is a plaque in the ground in front of the home where he was born in Sedalia, Missouri.

Jack Oakie is mentioned in the Coen brothers film Barton Fink as the favorite actor of Charlie, a character played by John Goodman.

During an October 18, 1985 interview with Johnny Carson, Jackie Gleason said that Oakie was one of the best comedians and dramatic actors he had ever seen.

== Filmography ==
| Year | Title | Role | Notes |
|---|---|---|---|
| 1923 | His Children's Children | Minor Role | Uncredited; Lost film |
| 1923 | Big Brother | Bit Part | Uncredited; Lost film |
| 1924 | Classmates | Bit Part | Uncredited; Lost film |
| 1928 | Finders Keepers | B.B.Brown | |
| 1928 | Road House | Sam | |
| 1928 | The Fleet's In | Searchlight Doyle | Lost film |
| 1928 | Someone to Love | Michael Casey | Lost film |
| 1929 | Sin Town | "Chicken" O'Toole | |
| 1929 | The Dummy | Dopey Hart | |
| 1929 | Chinatown Nights | The Reporter | |
| 1929 | The Wild Party | Al | |
| 1929 | Close Harmony | Ben Barney | |
| 1929 | The Man I Love | Lew Layton | |
| 1929 | Street Girl | Joe Spring | USA title: Barber John's Boy |
| 1929 | Hard to Get | Marty Martin | |
| 1929 | Fast Company | Elmer Kane | |
| 1929 | Sweetie | Tap-Tap Thompson | |
| 1930 | Hit the Deck | Bilge | Lost film |
| 1930 | The Social Lion | Marco Perkins | |
| 1930 | The Sap from Syracuse | Littleton Looney | aka The Sap from Abroad |
| 1930 | Let's Go Native | Voltaire McGinnis | |
| 1930 | Paramount on Parade | Himself, as one of the MC's | |
| 1930 | Sea Legs | Searchlight Doyle | |
| 1931 | The Gang Buster | "Cyclone" Case | |
| 1931 | June Moon | Frederick Martin Stevens | |
| 1931 | Dude Ranch | Jennifer | |
| 1931 | Touchdown | Babe Barton | UK title: Playing the Game |
| 1932 | Dancers in the Dark | Duke Taylor | |
| 1932 | Sky Bride | Alec Dugan | |
| 1932 | Make Me a Star | Himself | Uncredited |
| 1932 | Million Dollar Legs | Migg Tweeny | |
| 1932 | Once in a Lifetime | George Lewis | |
| 1932 | Madison Square Garden | Eddie Burke | |
| 1932 | If I Had a Million | Pvt. Mulligan | |
| 1932 | Uptown New York | Eddie Doyle | |
| 1933 | From Hell to Heaven | Charlie Bayne | |
| 1933 | Sailor Be Good | Kelsey Jones | |
| 1933 | The Eagle and the Hawk | Mike Richards | |
| 1933 | College Humor | Barney Shirrel | |
| 1933 | Too Much Harmony | Benny Day | |
| 1933 | Sitting Pretty | Chick Parker | |
| 1933 | Alice in Wonderland | Tweedledum | |
| 1934 | Looking for Trouble | Casey | |
| 1934 | Murder at the Vanities | Jack Ellery | |
| 1934 | Shoot the Works | Nicky Nelson | UK title: Thank Your Stars |
| 1934 | College Rhythm | Francis J. Finnegan | |
| 1935 | The Call of the Wild | Shorty Hoolihan | |
| 1935 | The Big Broadcast of 1936 | Spud Miller | |
| 1936 | King of Burlesque | Joe Cooney | |
| 1936 | Collegiate | Jerry Craig | UK title: Charm School |
| 1936 | Colleen | Joe Cork | |
| 1936 | Florida Special | Bangs Carter | |
| 1936 | The Texas Rangers | Henry B. "Wahoo" Jones | |
| 1936 | That Girl from Paris | Whammo Lonsdale | |
| 1937 | Champagne Waltz | Happy Gallagher | |
| 1937 | Super-Sleuth | Willard "Bill" Martin | |
| 1937 | The Toast of New York | Luke | |
| 1937 | Fight for Your Lady | Ham Hamilton | |
| 1937 | Hitting a New High | Corny Davis | |
| 1938 | Radio City Revels | Harry Miller | |
| 1938 | The Affairs of Annabel | Lanny Morgan | |
| 1938 | Annabel Takes a Tour | Lanny Morgan | aka Annabel Takes a Trip |
| 1938 | Thanks for Everything | Bates | |
| 1940 | Young People | Joe Ballantine | |
| 1940 | The Great Dictator | Benzino Napaloni | Nominated for the Academy Award for Best Supporting Actor |
| 1940 | Tin Pan Alley | Harry Calhoun | |
| 1940 | Little Men | Willie the Fox | |
| 1941 | The Great American Broadcast | Chuck Hadley | |
| 1941 | Navy Blues | Cake O'Hara | |
| 1941 | Rise and Shine | Boley Bolenciecwcz | |
| 1942 | Song of the Islands | Rusty Smith | |
| 1942 | Iceland | Slip Riggs | UK title: Katina |
| 1943 | Something to Shout About | Larry Martin | |
| 1943 | Hello, Frisco, Hello | Dan Daley | |
| 1943 | Wintertime | Skip Hutton | |
| 1944 | It Happened Tomorrow | Uncle Oscar Smith, aka Gigolini | |
| 1944 | The Merry Monahans | Pete Monahan | |
| 1944 | Sweet and Low-Down | Popsy | |
| 1944 | Bowery to Broadway | Michael O'Rourke | |
| 1945 | That's the Spirit | Steve "Slim" Gogarty | |
| 1945 | On Stage Everybody | Michael Sullivan | |
| 1946 | She Wrote the Book | Jerry Marlowe | |
| 1948 | Northwest Stampede | Mike Kirby (Clem) | |
| 1948 | When My Baby Smiles at Me | Bozo Evans | |
| 1949 | Thieves' Highway | Slob | |
| 1950 | Last of the Buccaneers | Sgt. Dominick | |
| 1951 | Tomahawk | Sol Beckworth | UK title: Battle of Powder River |
| 1956 | Around the World in 80 Days | Captain of the 'SS Henrietta' | |
| 1959 | The Wonderful Country | Travis Hyte | |
| 1960 | The Rat Race | Mac, Owner of Macs Bar | |
| 1961 | Lover Come Back | J. Paxton Miller | |
| 1966 | Daniel Boone (1964 TV series) | Otis Cobb | S3/E3 "Goliath" |

== Bibliography ==
- Jack Oakie (1980). Jack Oakie's Double Takes. Strawberry Hill Press. ISBN 0-89407-019-3. Autobiography published posthumously by Oakie's widow on January 1, 1980. 240 pages.
- Victoria Horne Oakie (1994). "Dear Jack": Hollywood birthday reminiscences to Jack Oakie. Strawberry Hill Press. ISBN 978-0-89407-113-3. Letters of congratulation and reminiscence sent from almost 150 celebrities to Jack Oakie in celebration of his 70th birthday. Compiled & edited by Mrs Oakie to commemorate his 90th birthday. 140 pages.
