= Gerard Carbonara =

American classical composer (1886–1959)

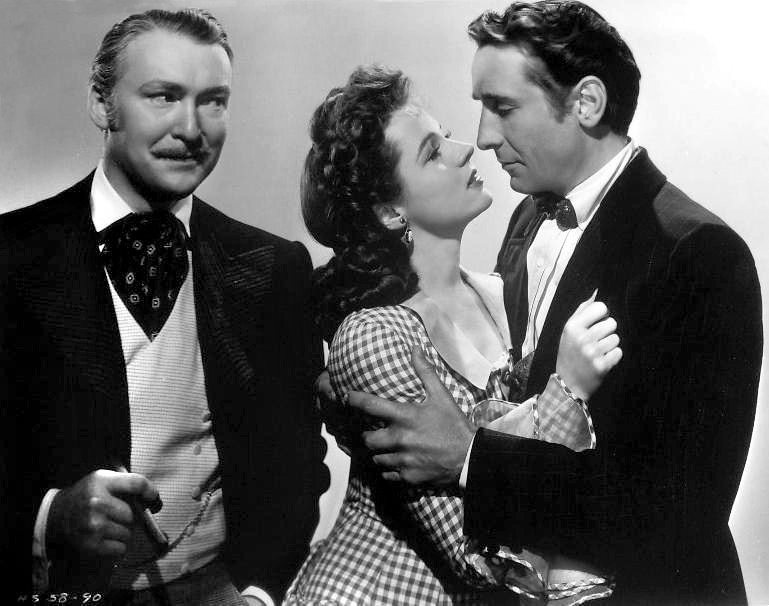
The Kansan (1943)

Gerard Carbonara (8 December 1886, New York City – 11 January 1959, Sherman Oaks) was an American composer, conductor, opera coach and concert violinist.

He received his formal music education at the National Conservatory of Music in New York on a scholarship. In 1908 he travelled abroad to Naples, where he continued his studies at the Naples Conservatory with composer Martucci Dworczak. He was employed as an opera coach in Milan in 1910. Later, he toured Europe as a concert violinist and conducted operas throughout Europe and, later, the US.

Carbonara began his film music career at the end of the silent film era. In the 1930s and 1940s he scored numerous films at Paramount Pictures, including American Empire, The Shepherd of the Hills, as well as a series of Mutt and Jeff cartoons (with co-composer James Bradford). Carbonara composed several cues for Stagecoach (1939), but did not receive screen credit because of a clause in his contract. Although the score, which featured the music of several composers, won an Oscar, Carbonara was not counted among the winners. However, he was nominated for The Kansan in 1943. In the 1940s, especially after World War II, he composed and arranged music for short films. Carbonara often worked closely with his colleague John Leipold.

In addition to his film scores Carbonara's oeuvre includes many serious works, among them an opera ("Armand"), individual pieces for solo piano ("Danse Fantastique", "Rhapsodie", "Hollywood Boulevard", "An American Tone Sketch", "Minuet" and "Petite Valse"), duos for violin and piano ("Aria", "Serenata Gotica", "Alla Tarantella" and "Dusk") and symphony orchestra ("Ode to Nature", "Concerto Orientale" and "Scherzetto Fantasia").

== Filmography ==
- Adoration (1928)
- Waterfront (1928)
- Warming Up (1928)
- Wolf Song (1929)
- Chinatown Nights (1929)
- The Hole in the Wall (1929)
- Young Eagles (1930)
- Forgotten Faces (1936)
- Big Brown Eyes (1936)
- The Texas Rangers (1936)
- Spendthrift (1936)
- The Case Against Mrs. Ames (1936)
- Racketeers in Exile (1937)
- The Mysterious Rider (1938)
- Arrest Bulldog Drummond (1939)
- Dr. Cyclops (1939) [co-composer with Dr Ernst Toch and Albert Hay Malotte]
- Island of Doomed Men (1940)
- The Shepherd of the Hills (1941)
- The Monster and the Girl (1941)
- The Night of January 16th (1941)
- American Empire (1942)
- Tombstone, the Town Too Tough to Die (1942)
- The Kansan (1943)
- The Town Went Wild (1944)
- Gunfighters (1947)
- The Big Wheel (1949)
