= The Legion of the Condemned =

1928 film

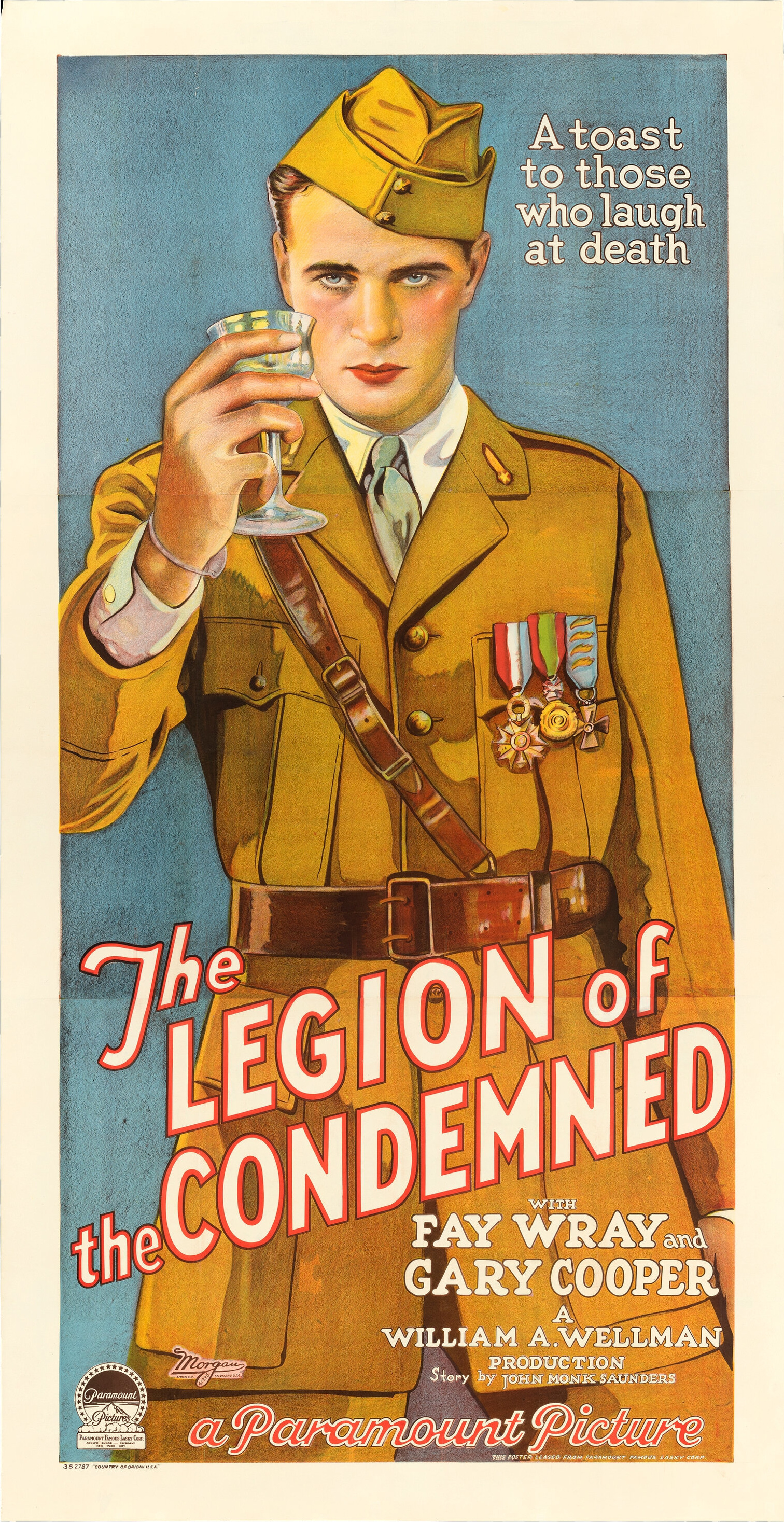
- Theatrical release poster
- Directed by: William A. Wellman
- Written by: John Monk Saunders; Jean de Limur; George Marion Jr. (intertitles)
- Produced by: Jesse L. Lasky; William A. Wellman; Adolph Zukor
- Starring: Fay Wray; Gary Cooper
- Cinematography: Henry W. Gerrard
- Edited by: Carl Pierson; Alyson Shaffer
- Production company: Paramount Famous Lasky Corporation
- Distributed by: Paramount Pictures
- Release date: March 10, 1928 (USA)
- Running time: 74 minutes
- Country: United States
- Language: Silent (English intertitles)
- Budget: $295,000 (est.)

The Legion of the Condemned (aka Legion of the Condemned) is a 1928 American silent drama film directed by William A. Wellman and produced by Jesse L. Lasky, Wellman, and Adolph Zukor and distributed by Paramount Pictures. Written by former World War I flight instructor John Monk Saunders and Jean de Limur, with intertitles by George Marion Jr., the film stars Fay Wray and Gary Cooper.

== Plot ==
In World War I, four young men from various walks of life sign up as flyers for the Lafayette Escadrille, a military unit known as "The Legion of the Condemned". The unit is composed mostly of American volunteer pilots flying fighter aircraft. All four men are running away from something: the law, love, or themselves. Whenever a dangerous mission comes up, the four men draw cards to see who will fly off to near-certain doom. With his best friend Byron Dashwood already having died in combat, Gale Price draws the high card next time around.

As he prepares to drop a spy behind enemy lines, Gale remembers the events leading up to this moment - recounting his ill-fated romance with Christine Charteris, whom he now believes to be a German spy. As he approaches his aircraft, Gale discovers that his passenger is Christine, who is actually an operative in the French secret service. Before she can explain her true identity, Gale is obliged to fly Christine to her rendezvous point.

Both young people are captured with Christine sentenced to be executed as a spy. Just before they go to the firing squad, a bombing raid takes place. Afterward, they are rescued by their unit and reconciled.

== Cast ==
- Gary Cooper as Gale Price
- Fay Wray as Christine Charteris
- Barry Norton as Byron Dashwood
- Lane Chandler as Charles Holabird
- Francis McDonald as Gonzolo Vasquez
- Voya George as Robert Montagnal
- Freeman Wood as Richard De Witt (credited as George Wood)
- Albert Conti as Von Hohendorff
- Charlotte Bird as Celeste
- Toto Guette as Mechanic

== Production ==
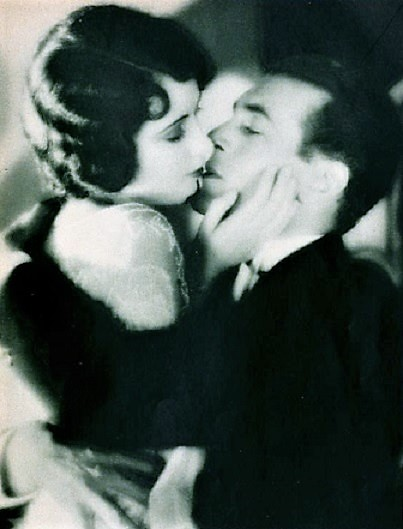
Fay Wray and Gary Cooper in The Legion of the Condemned (1928)

Fresh from their successful collaboration on Wings (1927), Saunders and Wellman embarked on a similar story, suggested by Wellman. Myron Selznick, who acted as both a talent agent and his promotor, advised Wellman to pursue Paramount Pictures and ensure his future as a director with this film. (Note: During the making of Wings, Wellman and Paramount were in a contract dispute, with the director not receiving his salary until after the film was released and his next project, The Legion of the Condemned was in production.)

Wellman utilized footage from the earlier "mountain" of unused film footage of aerial scenes in Wings, but new sequences were also shot at the Griffith Park Airport. Production began on October 27, 1927 with principal photography completed a month later. A small "air force" was assembled, using some of the same aircraft that had appeared in Wings including three DH.4s, two Fokker D.VIIs, a Thomas-Morse MB-3 and SPAD S.VII. (Note: A DH.9 and two Nieuport 28s were used for some scenes.)

While in production, studio management had second thoughts about recycling so much of the earlier footage, and had Wellman remove some of the scenes from Wings.

== Reception ==
Notable as the first film to star Gary Cooper, who had a secondary role in Wings, The Legion of the Condemned received mixed reviews from critics. Mordaunt Hall, writing in The New York Times, noted: "William A. Wellman and John Monk Saunders, the two young men who were responsible for that significant production, 'Wings,' have contributed to the screen another melodrama of the warriors of the clouds. This new feature, 'The Legion of the Condemned,' has an excellent underlying motive, but in endeavoring to give love its place on the battlefield, the producer and the author have not exactly neglected opportunities for pictorial license. The suspense is piled on in the last chapter; but, judging by the demonstrative approval of the audience at one juncture, this was more than moderately successful."

=== Preservation ===
No copies of The Legion of the Condemned are known to have survived, and it is now considered a lost film.

== See also ==
- Lafayette Escadrille (1958)
- Flyboys (2006)
- List of lost films
