= The Man I Love (1929 film) =

Romantic film by William A. Wellman

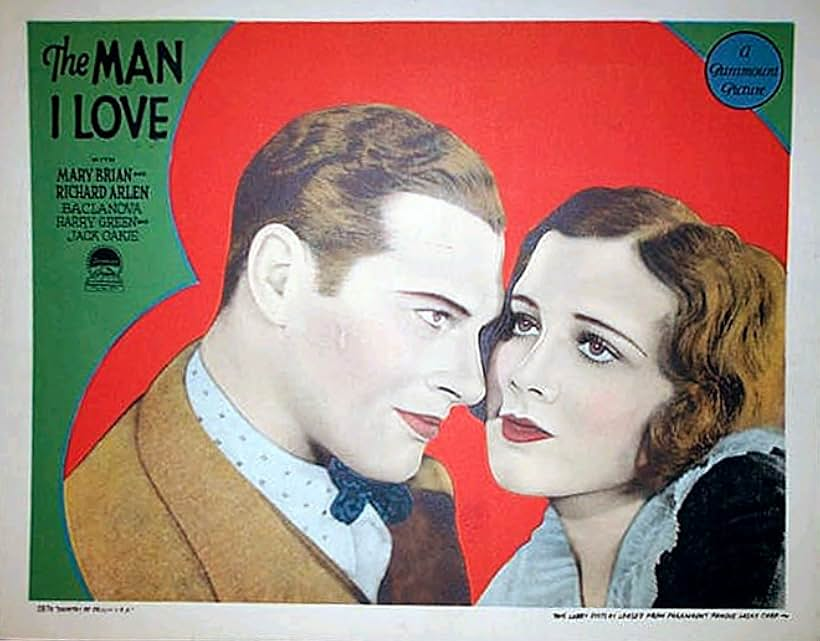
- Lobby card
- Directed by: William A. Wellman
- Written by: Percy Heath (writer); Herman J. Mankiewicz (story); Joseph L. Mankiewicz (titles)
- Produced by: David O. Selznick (associate producer)
- Starring: Richard Arlen; Mary Brian; Olga Baclanova
- Cinematography: Henry W. Gerrard
- Edited by: Alyson Shaffer
- Distributed by: Paramount Pictures
- Release date: May 25, 1929
- Running time: 7 reels (approximately 70 minutes)
- Country: United States
- Language: English

The Man I Love (1929) is a part-talking sound film from Paramount Pictures produced in parallel silent and sound versions. This film survives in a copy sold to television in the 1950s. The film stars Richard Arlen. Some sources refer to this as Arlen's first sound film, but he co-starred with Nancy Carroll in Dorothy Arzner's Manhattan Cocktail (1928), another part-talking picture released by Paramount.

== Plot ==
The film

A prizefighter (Arlen) is struggling to be a champ and is in love with a good girl (Brian) but also involved with a society beauty (Baclanova) at the same time.

== Cast ==
- Richard Arlen as Dum-Dum Brooks
- Mary Brian as Celia Fields
- Olga Baclanova as Sonia Barondoff
- Harry Green as Curly Bloom
- Jack Oakie as Lew Layton
- Pat O'Malley as D.J. McCarthy
- Leslie Fenton as Carlo Vesper
- Charles Sullivan as Champ Mahoney

== Soundtrack ==
- "Celia" (music by Richard A. Whiting and lyrics by Leo Robin)

== See also ==
- List of early sound feature films (1926–1929)
