= Ernest Granville Booth =

American criminal and Hollywood screenwriter

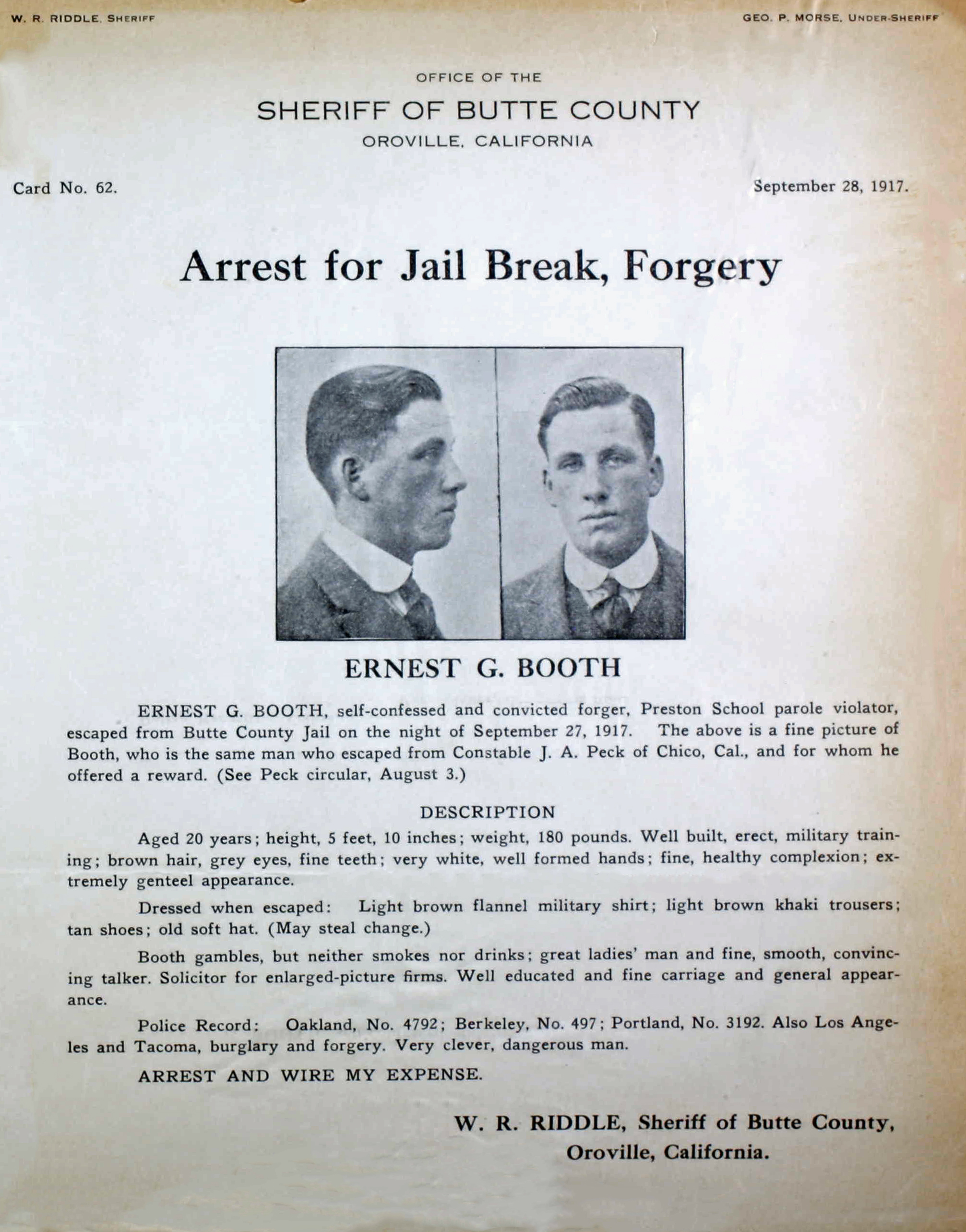
Ernest Booth in 1917, from an arrest flier

Ernest Granville Booth (August 12, 1898–June 14, 1959) was an American criminal and screenwriter who got his start in writing while an inmate of San Quentin Prison. Considered to be one of the "star writers ... of the California penal system", while incarcerated Booth became a protégé of H. L. Mencken, and was responsible for the story or screenplay of several early crime drama movies, including the silent Ladies of the Mob, starring Clara Bow.

== Biography ==
Booth was born in Oakland, California; his father Stuart W. Booth was a prominent area journalist. He was sent to the Preston School of Industry reform school as an early adolescent following an arrest for burglary, and went on to serve several years in prison for various crimes, at one point being dubbed the "ammonia bank bandit", for his holdups where he threatened tellers with a so-called ammonia bomb. He gained notoriety for several escapes and attempted escapes, and was described as "somewhat of a joker" after one episode where after escaping while being transported to California, he mailed a newspaper clipping describing his escape to his jailer in Milwaukee, where he had been originally captured.

After being imprisoned in Folsom and San Quentin, where he eventually drew Mencken's attention, several of his stories were published before his parole in 1937. After his release, he eventually began writing crime-related story treatments for Hollywood.

In 1947, he was arrested again when it was discovered that he had been responsible for a 1943 burglary and a recent series of robberies, returning him to prison until his death in 1959.

== Works ==
=== Film ===
- Ladies of the Mob (1928)
- Ladies of the Big House (1931)
- Penrod's Double Trouble (1938)
- Women Without Names (1940)
- Men of San Quentin (1942)

=== Books ===
- Stealing Through Life (1929, Alfred A Knopf, ASIN B00085O1BQ)
- With Sirens Screaming (1945, Doubleday, Doran and Company, ASIN B0006AQMS8)

=== Stories ===
Published in American Mercury:

- "We Rob a Bank" (1927)
- "A Texas Chain Gang" (1927)
- "Ladies of the Mob" (1927)
- "Ladies in Durance Vile" (1931)

== See also ==
- American prison literature
