= Max Bergunker =

American film score composer

Max Bergunker (March 3, 1885, in Mykolaiv, Russian Empire - July 8, 1969, in Brooklyn) was a Russian-born American film score composer, known for his score on films such as The Patriot (1928), Chinatown Nights (1929), and Fighting Caravans (1931). He emigrated to the United States in 1924, and was naturalised as an American citizen in 1929.
