= Mama Loves Papa =

Mama Loves Papa may refer to:

- Mama Loves Papa (1933 film), a 1933 American film directed by Norman Z. McLeod
- Mama Loves Papa (1945 film), a 1945 American film directed by Frank R. Strayer
