= Caught (1931 film) =

1931 film

- Theatrical release poster
- Directed by: Edward Sloman
- Screenplay by: Agnes Brand Leahy; Keene Thompson
- Starring: Richard Arlen; Louise Dresser; Frances Dee; Tom Kennedy; Martin Burton; Marcia Manners; Syd Saylor
- Cinematography: Charles Lang
- Production company: Paramount Pictures
- Distributed by: Paramount Pictures
- Release date: August 8, 1931
- Running time: 68 minutes
- Country: United States
- Language: English

Caught is a 1931 American Pre-Code Western film directed by Edward Sloman and written by Agnes Brand Leahy and Keene Thompson. The film stars Richard Arlen, Louise Dresser, Frances Dee, Tom Kennedy, and Syd Saylor. The film was released on August 8, 1931, by Paramount Pictures.

== Cast ==
- Richard Arlen as Lt. Tom Colton
- Louise Dresser as Calamity Jane
- Frances Dee as Kate Winslow
- Tom Kennedy as Jard Harmon
- Martin Burton as Curly Braydon
- Marcia Manners as Goldie
- Syd Saylor as Sgt. Weems
- James Mason as Scully
- Guy Oliver as McNeill
- Edward LeSaint as Haverstraw
- Charles K. French as Bradford
- Lon Poff as Clem
