= Agnes Brand Leahy =

American screenwriter (1893–1934)

- Born: Agnes Laura Brand; August 18, 1893; Portland, Oregon, U.S.
- Died: March 31, 1934 (aged 40); San Francisco, California, U.S.
- Occupation: Screenwriter

Agnes Brand Leahy (August 18, 1893 – March 31, 1934) was an American screenwriter active in the 1920s and early 1930s.

== Early life ==
Agnes Laura Brand was born in Portland, Oregon, and raised in Washington state, the daughter of Matthew Douglas Brand and Mila Hill Brand. Her father was a real estate agent.

== Career ==
Leahy and her husband relocated to Southern California in 1918 and secured jobs at the Paramount studio, she as a stenographer and he as a production manager. She moved into editing work, and ultimately becoming a scenarist at the studio. "The average studio stenographer has a profound knowledge of screen material, production costs and picture making," she explained in 1931.

Over the course of her career, she worked with filmmakers like John Ford, Dorothy Arzner, Joseph L. Mankiewicz, and Frank R. Strayer. She often wrote Westerns; she wrote one of the first talking pictures starring Gary Cooper, The Spoilers (1930). She adapted a Zane Grey story with Keene Thompson and Edward E. Paramore Jr., produced as another Gary Cooper vehicle, Fighting Caravans (1931). She also co-wrote a satirical comedy, Forbidden Adventure (1931), based on Sinclair Lewis's Let's Play King. She worked with Sidney Buchman and Percy Heath to adapt a Rupert Hughes novel into No One Man (1932) starring Carole Lombard. Her last movie was Lone Cowboy (1933), a Western for child star Jackie Cooper.

== Personal life ==
Brand married Philip Frederic "Fred" Leahy in Seattle in 1913. The couple lived in Manhattan Beach with her widowed mother and younger brother. After a prolonged illness and leave from Paramount, Leahy died in 1934, at the age of 40, at a sanitorium near San Francisco. Her grave is in Forest Lawn Memorial Park in Glendale.

== Selected filmography ==
- Cap'n Jericho (1933)
- Lone Cowboy (1933)
- Pick-Up (1933)
- Evenings for Sale (1932)
- The Night of June 13 (1932)
- Forgotten Commandments (1932)
- Sky Bride (1932)
- No One Man (1932)
- Forbidden Adventure (1931)
- The Beloved Bachelor (1931)
- Caught (1931)
- Fighting Caravans (1931)
- The Spoilers (1930)
- Only the Brave (1930)
- Stairs of Sand (1929)
- Moran of the Marines (1928)
- Red Hair (1928)
- Get Your Man (1927)
- The Blue Eagle (1926)
- Go Straight (1925)
