= French dressing (disambiguation) =

French dressing is a term originally used for an oil and vinegar based salad dressing.

French dressing may also refer to:

- French Dressing (1927 film)
- French Dressing (1964 film)

== See also ==
- Vinaigrette, culinary sauce known as "French dressing" in the 19th century
