= The Sin Ship =

1931 film

- Theatrical poster
- Directed by: Louis Wolheim; James Anderson (assistant); Charles Kerr (assistant)
- Screenplay by: Hugh Herbert
- Story by: Keene Thompson; Agnes Brand Leahy
- Produced by: William LeBaron; Myles Connelly (associate)
- Starring: Louis Wolheim; Mary Astor; Ian Keith
- Cinematography: Nicholas Musuraca
- Edited by: George Marsh; Ann McKnight
- Production company: RKO Radio Pictures
- Distributed by: RKO Radio Pictures
- Release date: April 18, 1931 (US)
- Running time: 65 minutes 7 reels
- Country: United States
- Language: English

The Sin Ship is a 1931 American pre-Code drama film produced and distributed by RKO Radio Pictures and directed by the actor Louis Wolheim in his only directorial effort. The film marks the last contribution Wolheim made to the film industry prior to his death from cancer one month shy of his fifty-first birthday. In addition to directing, Wolheim also starred in the picture, alongside Mary Astor and Ian Keith. The screenplay was written by Hugh Herbert (who also acted in the film), from a story by Keene Thompson and Agnes Brand Leahy. The film was released in April 1931, two months after Wolheim's death, and is preserved at the Library of Congress.

== Plot ==
Smiley Marsden is a bank robber on the run from the police, traveling with his moll, Frisco Kitty. Cornered, they arrive at the San Francisco docks, where they convince the captain of a small cargo ship, Sam McVeigh, to take them aboard on his run to Mexico, mostly because he is enchanted with Kitty. Marsden is posing as a minister. As the ship sets sail, every sailor aboard lusts after Kitty, none more so than the captain. One night, when inebriated, he corners Kitty in his cabin and begins to force himself on her. She stops him by basically telling him that he is better than that, which makes him do some deep soul-searching. During the rest of the voyage, Kitty manages to fend off the rest of the crew, with the help of the admiring captain.

By the time they dock in Mexico, McVeigh has fallen in love with Kitty, who he still believes to be the wife of "Minister" Marsden. Aware that the authorities might become suspicious of him if McVeigh's ship departs immediately, Marsden delays their departure, first through the use of Kitty's flirtation with McVeigh, and later through outright sabotage. When Kitty finally protests, he beats her. After the crew accuses McVeigh of the sabotage and tell him they plan to rape Kitty at the first opportunity, he goes to Marsden’s hotel room to enlist his help in protecting her. Marsden, who has been drinking, reveals his true colors and exposes the truth about Kitty. McVeigh knocks him out but is prevented from doing anything more by the appearance of a man holding a gun. This unnamed character, previously seen as an American tourist, identifies himself as a detective who has been pursuing Marsden. He takes his prisoner away. McVeigh follows but climbs back in the window to see Kitty. She tells about her childhood poverty, her abuse at the hands of men, and how she meant what she said about the sea and the sky. However, she cannot run away; she has to face the consequences. McVeigh leaves, and three shots ring out. A distraught Kitty runs into the street, where she finds the detective, gun drawn. Marsden tried to escape, and he shot him. Kitty is prepared to go with him, but he says he has nothing on her, it was Marsden he wanted. She is perfectly free. She and McVeigh end up together.

== Cast ==
- Louis Wolheim as Captain Sam McVeigh
- Mary Astor as Frisco Kitty
- Ian Keith as Smiley Marsden
- Hugh Herbert as Charlie - The Mate
- Russ Powell as Inspector Colby
- Alan Roscoe as Crewman Dave
- Bert Starkey as Ship's Cook

(Cast list as per AFI database)

== Reception ==
The picture received only lukewarm reviews at best. Photoplay said that the film proved "... the difficulty of both acting in and directing a picture." Motion Picture Magazine described the film, "The first directorial effort of Louis Wolheim does not get off to a very auspicious start, but once the rat of melodrama is forced out into the open, a lively time is had by all." The Motion Picture Herald, on the other hand, was more positive, stating the film had a "... meaningless title tacked onto a cracking good sea story", classing it as a "... very satisfactory entertainment for the smaller communities."

== Notes ==
The title of the film during production was Sheep's Clothing.

Many of the harbor sequences were shot on Catalina Island, where LeBaron rented six speedboats to patrol the coastal waters and dampen the sound from sightseers and other onlookers.

After completion of the film, Wolheim expressed his dissatisfaction with the role of directing, stating that from that point forward he only intended to act.

After completion of this film, Wolheim began to actively pursue a role in Howard Hughes' film, The Front Page. As part of his campaign, he lost over thirty pounds in three weeks. After being rewarded with the role, he died suddenly. Accounts of the time stated it was due to his drastic weight loss, although later sources indicated it was due to stomach cancer. He would be replaced by Adolphe Menjou.
