= The Marriage Playground =

1929 film

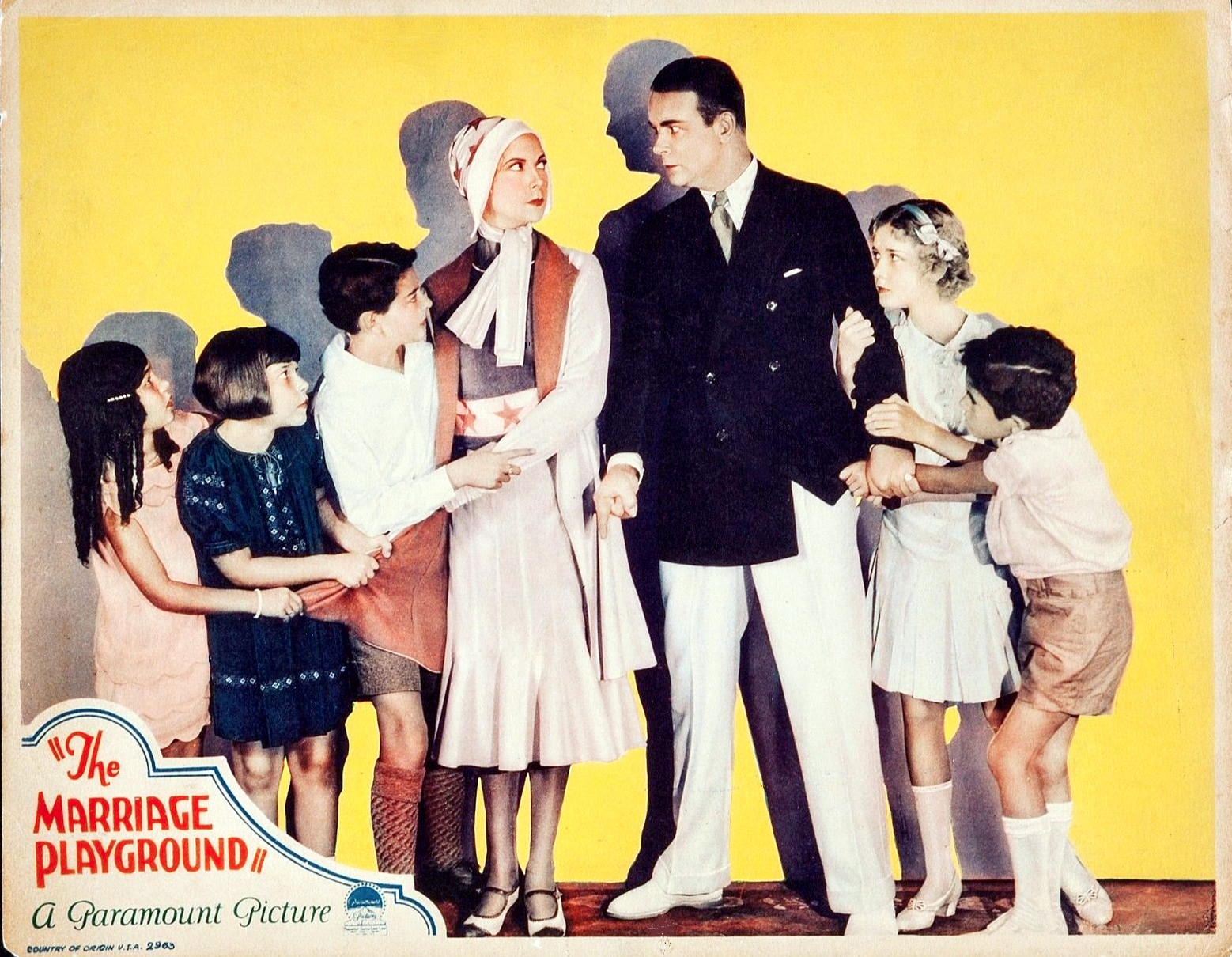
- Lobby card
- Directed by: Lothar Mendes
- Screenplay by: Doris Anderson; J. Walter Ruben; Edith Wharton
- Based on: The Children by Edith Wharton
- Starring: Mary Brian; Fredric March; Lilyan Tashman; Huntley Gordon; Kay Francis; William Austin; Seena Owen
- Cinematography: Victor Milner
- Music by: Henry Kimball Hadley
- Production company: Paramount Pictures
- Distributed by: Paramount Pictures
- Release date: December 21, 1929
- Running time: 70 minutes
- Country: United States
- Language: English

The Marriage Playground is a 1929 American pre-Code drama film directed by Lothar Mendes, and written by Doris Anderson, J. Walter Ruben, and Edith Wharton. It is based on the 1928 novel The Children by Edith Wharton and starring Mary Brian, Fredric March, Lilyan Tashman, Huntley Gordon, Kay Francis, William Austin and Seena Owen. The film was released on December 21, 1929, by Paramount Pictures. The film entered the public domain in the United States in January 2025.

== Plot ==
The Marriage Playground (1929)

A daughter tries to keep her parents together.

== Cast ==
- Mary Brian as Judith Wheater
- Fredric March as Martin Boyne
- Lilyan Tashman as Joyce Wheater
- Huntley Gordon as Cliff Wheater
- Kay Francis as Lady Wrench
- William Austin as Lord Wrench
- Seena Owen as Rose Sellers
- Philippe De Lacy as Terry Wheater
- Anita Louise as Blanca Wheater
- Mitzi Green as Zinnie Wheater
- Billy Seay as Bun Wheater
- Ruby Parsley as Beatrice Wheater
- Donald Smith as Chip Wheater
- Jocelyn Lee as Sybil
- Maude Turner Gordon as Aunt Julia Langley
- Armand Kaliz as Prince Matriano
- Joan Standing as Miss Scopey
- Gordon De Main as Mr. Delafield
- Spencer Bell as Policeman #1 (uncredited)
- Clive Brook as A man on the Phone (uncredited)
- Fred Malatesta as Policeman #2 (uncredited)

== See also ==
- List of early sound feature films (1926–1929)
- The Children (1990)
