= Only the Brave (1930 film) =

1930 film

- Publicity photo
- Directed by: Frank Tuttle
- Written by: Richard H. Digges Jr. (titles)
- Story by: Agnes Brand Leahy; Edward E. Paramore Jr.; Keene Thompson
- Produced by: Hector Turnbull
- Starring: Gary Cooper; Mary Brian; Phillips Holmes
- Cinematography: Harry Fischbeck
- Edited by: Doris Drought
- Music by: W. Franke Harling; John Leipold
- Production company: Paramount Pictures
- Distributed by: Paramount Pictures
- Release date: March 8, 1930 (USA)
- Running time: 66 minutes 8 reels, 6,024 ft
- Country: United States
- Language: English

Only the Brave is a 1930 American Pre-Code drama film directed by Frank Tuttle and starring Gary Cooper, Mary Brian, and Phillips Holmes. It is a drama of the American Civil War.

Written by Agnes Brand Leahy, Edward E. Paramore Jr., Keene Thompson, and Richard H. Digges Jr., the film is about a Union Army captain who travels into Confederate territory as a spy with false dispatches hoping to mislead the Confederate forces. His mission is complicated when he falls in love with a southern woman who comes to his aid. Produced by Hector Turnbull for Paramount Pictures, Only the Brave was released on March 8, 1930, in the United States.

== Plot ==
During the American Civil War, Capt. James Braydon visits his sweetheart and finds her with another man. Angered by the betrayal, he volunteers to become a spy for the Union. His first assignment involves carrying false military dispatches behind enemy lines and allow them to be discovered by Confederate Army officers in order to mislead them. Braydon sets off on his dangerous mission.

Pretending to be a Confederate sympathizer in possession of vital Union plans, Braydon arrives at the plantation of a beautiful Southern belle, Barbara Calhoun, who has organized a ball for Confederate officers. At the ball, Braydon openly flirts with his gracious host in order to make one of the Confederate officers, Capt. Robert Darrington, jealous. Darrington is in love with Barbara, and Braydon believes that if he can make him jealous, he will be arrested and his fraudulent dispatches will be discovered. Braydon's plan is disrupted, however, by Barbara who comes to his defense, and soon falls in love with him.

In the coming days, Barbara continues to save Braydon from being arrested, even after she discovers that he is a Union spy. Each time he attempts to get arrested, she intervenes and arranges for his release. Finally, Braydon leaps from a window and is captured by the Confederates, who discover the fraudulent dispatches and soon act on them. Later, after they discover that the dispatches were a deception, they order Braydon executed by firing squad. Just before the sentence can be carried out, the Union Army arrives, and in the subsequent battle, Braydon is saved, although seriously wounded. Barbara is there to comfort him.

Sometime later, after General Lee surrenders at Appomattox Court House to end the war, Barbara and Braydon are married in a military wedding.

== Cast ==
- Gary Cooper as Capt. James Braydon
- Mary Brian as Barbara Calhoun
- Phillips Holmes as Capt. Robert Darrington
- James Neill as Vance Calhoun
- Morgan Farley as Lt. Tom Wendell
- Guy Oliver as Gen. U.S. Grant
- John Elliott as Gen. Robert E. Lee
- E. H. Calvert as The Colonel
- Virginia Bruce as Elizabeth
- Elda Voelkel as Lucy Cameron
- William Le Maire as The Sentry
- Freeman Wood as Elizabeth's Lover
- Lalo Encinas as Gen. Grant's Secretary

== Production ==
Only the Brave was filmed at Paramount Studios at 5555 Melrose Avenue in Hollywood, Los Angeles, California. The films stars, Gary Cooper and Mary Brian, also appeared together in The Virginian (1929).

== Critical response ==
Only the Brave received positive reviews upon its theatrical release. In the Reading Eagle, the reviewer wrote that Cooper's performance in the film was "far better" than his "previously satisfactory best" in The Virginian. The reviewer continued:

There is something about this tall Montana youth that seems to mark him as the most perfect American type. He is virile and gallant, but yet not given to thunderous outpourings of unseemly emotion. His quiet courage inspires hero-worship in the hearts of all who behold him and hear him in his masterful work upon the talking screen.

The reviewer also felt that Mary Brian was effective in reprising her role as Cooper's love interest, as she did in The Virginian.

== See also ==
- List of films and television shows about the American Civil War
