= Doris Anderson (screenwriter) =

American screenwriter

- Born: Doris Smith; November 14, 1897; Chico, California, USA
- Died: June 1971 (aged 73); Washington, District of Columbia, USA
- Education: University of Southern California
- Occupations: Screenwriter, journalist
- Spouse: Anthony Jowitt

Doris Anderson (November 14, 1897 – June 1971) was a prolific American screenwriter active during 1920s through the 1950s.

== Biography ==
Doris was born in Chico, California, to William Smith and Mabel Dorn; she was an only child. Her parents divorced when she was young, and she was raised by her mother.

Anderson graduated from the University of Southern California, and she worked as a journalist and a publicity agent before joining Paramount as a scenarist. She wrote silent films before moving into talkies.

In 1930, she married British screenwriter Anthony Jowitt, who worked at MGM; they had a daughter, author and dance critic Deborah Jowitt.

Anderson died in June 1971 in Washington, D.C.

== Selected filmography ==
- Never a Dull Moment (1950)
- That Brennan Girl (1946)
- Salute for Three (1943)
- Mrs. Wiggs of the Cabbage Patch (1942)
- Women in War (1940)
- Beauty for the Asking (1939)
- Give Me a Sailor (1938)
- Sophie Lang Goes West (1937)
- The Girl from Scotland Yard (1937)
- King of Gamblers (1937)
- And So They Were Married (1936)
- Without Regret (1935)
- Straight from the Heart (1935)
- I Give My Love (1934)
- Love Birds (1934)
- Glamour (1934)
- Uncertain Lady (1934)
- Salomy Jane (1932)
- Cascarrabias (1930) (adaptation)
- Anybody's Woman (1930)
- Grumpy (1930)
- True to the Navy (1930)
- The Marriage Playground (1929) (adaptation)
- Charming Sinners (1929) (adaptation)
- The Wolf of Wall Street (1929)
- Ten Modern Commandments (1927)
- The World at Her Feet (1927) (adaptation)
- Ain't Love Funny? (1927)
- Afraid to Love (1927)
- A Kiss in a Taxi (1927)
- Her Honor, the Governor (1926)
