= The Code of the Mounted =

1935 film directed by Sam Newfield

- Directed by: Sam Newfield
- Written by: Milton Raison
- Based on: the short story, "Wheels of Fate" by James Oliver Curwood
- Produced by: Sigmund Neufeld; Maurice Conn
- Starring: Kermit Maynard; Robert Warwick; Jim Thorpe
- Cinematography: Edgar Lyons
- Edited by: John English
- Production company: Ambassador Pictures
- Release date: June 8, 1935 (US)
- Running time: 60 minutes
- Country: United States
- Language: English

The Code of the Mounted is a 1935 American drama film directed by Sam Newfield from a screenplay by Milton Raison. The film stars Kermit Maynard, Robert Warwick, and Jim Thorpe.

== Plot ==
Raoul Marlin kills a fur trapper, and is captured and imprisoned by members of the Royal Canadian Mounted Police. Snaky, a member of his gang, kills the two Mounties guarding him, and helps him escape, but another Mountie, Jim Wilson, tracks him down and recaptures him. However, as they are making their way back to jail, more members of the gang Marlin belongs to, including the gang's leader, Jean, waylay them and free Marlin once again. Wilson and his partner, Rogers, begin tracking the gang down. The trail leads them to a general store which is owned by Duval, who is Jean's second-in-command, as well as being in love with her. Wilson hatches a plan to go undercover and impersonate a notorious thief and murderer, Benet. When he gets to the store, he witnesses Duval kill an Indian, when the Indian refuses to sell his furs for fifty cents each. Jean tells him to get out of there, but Wilson gives her his story of being Benet, and wanting to partner with her and split the black market in the region with her. Wilson's cover is further bolstered when Rogers begins spreading a "rumor" around town that Wilson is Benet. After spreading the rumor, Rogers leaves to go get more Mounties to help break up the gang.

Duval, jealous of the attention Jean is bestowing on Wilson/Benet, as well as being upset over being shut out of their deal, begins to dig into Benet's history. At the newspaper office, he finds out that the real Benet had been hung a short time earlier. He takes the newspaper article to Jean, who is furious, and gathers her gang to go after Wilson. Just as they are about to hunt Wilson down, Rogers and the others Mounties arrive. Most of the gang is arrested, but Jean and Marlin escape. Wilson takes out after the two. As he catches up with them, Marlin gets a bead on him, but is shot and killed by Jean, who has developed feelings for Wilson. In exchange, Wilson lets Jean escape.

== Cast ==
- Kermit Maynard as Jim Wilson, also known as Benet
- Robert Warwick as Inspector Malloy
- Jim Thorpe as Eagle Feather
- Lillian Miles as Jean
- Syd Saylor as Rogers
- Wheeler Oakman as Duval
- Eddie Phillips as Louis
- Dick Curtis as Snakey
- Stanley Blystone as Constable
- Roger Williams as Raoul Marlin
- Artie Ortego as Trapper

== Production ==
This was the fifth production of a work by James Oliver Curwood starring Kermit Maynard. It went into production on May 9, 1935, directed by Sam Neufeld. It was scheduled for a June 8 release, and opened on time.

== Reception ==
The Film Daily gave it a positive review, calling it an "outdoor action story with better than usual attention to general production details". They complimented the scenery, Maynard's roping and riding skills, and felt it had enough action throughout, but went "slightly overboard on dialogue and gunplay". The felt the direction was good, and the cinematography excellent. In a brief review, the Motion Picture Herald gave it a lukewarm review, saying that the film was "fair", but the cinematography was "excellent", and Maynard's performance was "well-liked".
