= Acquitted (1929 film) =

1929 film directed by Frank R. Strayer

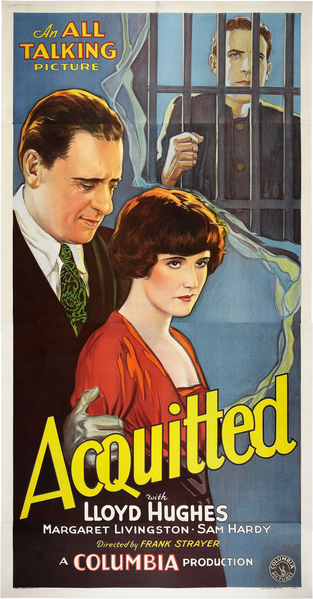
- Theatrical poster
- Directed by: Frank R. Strayer
- Written by: Keene Thompson
- Produced by: Harry Cohn
- Starring: Lloyd Hughes; Margaret Livingston; Sam Hardy
- Cinematography: Ted Tetzlaff
- Edited by: David Berg
- Production company: Columbia Pictures
- Distributed by: Columbia Pictures
- Release date: November 15, 1929 (US)
- Running time: 7 reels
- Country: United States
- Language: English

Acquitted is a 1929 American All-Talking melodrama sound film directed by Frank R. Strayer, from a screenplay by Keene Thompson. The film stars Lloyd Hughes, Margaret Livingston, and Sam Hardy, and was released by Columbia Pictures on November 15, 1929.

== Plot ==
Inside the prison hospital of a large eastern penitentiary, Marian, a hardened member of New York's underworld, lies gravely ill. Among the prison's medical staff is Dr. Bradford, a once-promising physician now serving a life sentence for murder.

When Marian's life hangs in the balance, Bradford risks his own health to give her a transfusion of his blood. The act bonds them. In the drab confines of the prison ward, a strange tenderness grows—two lost souls, both victims of circumstance, discovering love where none should exist.

Bradford is serving life for the killing of Joe Vasetti, a petty addict nicknamed “Hoppy Joe.” Witnesses at his trial swore that Bradford had hooked Vasetti on cocaine and killed him to silence him. Bradford has always denied the charge. His version: Vasetti stormed into his office with a gun, demanding cocaine. Bradford complied to save his life, but later tried to seize the drug back. Vasetti struck him unconscious, and when Bradford awoke, police had him in custody—charged with murder.

No one believed him. But Marian does. She vows to clear his name once her eighteen-month sentence is served.

Frank Egan, a master criminal and Marian's former underworld boss, secretly engineered her imprisonment. Egan has long desired Marian, using her in his rackets, but never winning her heart. Sending her to prison was his way of demonstrating that he was the boss—and that she would yield to him once free.

Egan operates his empire from a luxurious hotel, a glamorous front for his criminal activities. The police, led by Detective Nelson, suspect him of numerous robberies but can never pin anything down. Nelson hovers around Egan's hotel, always watching, probing. Once, during a robbery investigation, he even hints Egan had a hand in Joe Vasetti's murder. But Egan's airtight alibi silences him.

When Marian is released, she goes straight to Egan's hotel. He explains why he punished her and presses his claim, but Marian rebuffs him firmly. Suspicious, Egan cleverly coaxes the truth from her: she loves Dr. Bradford, and she has only returned to underworld life to hunt down Vasetti's real killer.

To her shock, Egan offers to secure Bradford's release. She is thrilled—but wary. She knows Egan's cunning too well.

Egan confers with his lieutenants, McManus and Tony. With them is Smith, an elderly spy on Egan's payroll. Smith idolizes his only son, Eddie, who now needs $85,000 or face prison himself. Desperate, Smith falls into Egan's trap. Egan offers the money if Smith will falsely confess to killing Vasetti. Smith, frantic to save his boy, agrees.

Egan's scheme is twofold: by pinning Vasetti's death on Smith, Marian's investigations are halted. And once Bradford is freed, Egan can have him killed—leaving Marian vulnerable to his control.

The plan works. Bradford is released, and Marian joyfully meets him at the prison gates. Together they set off toward New York by motorcar. But the chauffeur is one of Egan's men. At Tarrytown, the car conveniently breaks down. Marian and Bradford step into a roadside inn.

An emergency call for a doctor arrives. Bradford rushes out to answer it, promising to return. Hours pass—he does not come back. Alarmed, Marian is about to search when Egan himself strolls in, coolly confident. Smiling, he drops a coin in the inn's mechanical piano and requests his favorite tune, “When My Baby Smiles at Me.” Then he informs the horrified Marian that Bradford has been seized by McManus and Tony. If they receive no call from him before midnight, Bradford will be dead.

Back at his luxurious suite, Egan lays out the bargain: Marian must prove her love for him, or Bradford dies. Marian, furious, refuses—and produces a revolver. Egan taunts her. If she kills him, he sneers, Bradford's doom is sealed, for only Egan knows the phone number to his captors.

Marian pulls the trigger. Egan collapses, wounded.

Now at her mercy, Egan realizes he needs a doctor. Marian insists only Bradford can be trusted. Weak and desperate, Egan gives her the number. She telephones McManus, but he suspects a trick and refuses to move without proof. At Egan's suggestion, Marian puts “When My Baby Smiles at Me” on the phonograph. The familiar melody convinces McManus the order is genuine. He brings Bradford at once.

Despite every reason to despise Egan, Bradford treats him with expert skill, saving his life. The doctor's selflessness cracks Egan's hardened shell. For the first time, he feels remorse.

Calling McManus and Tony as witnesses, Egan confesses: he killed Joe Vasetti. It was his crime that condemned Bradford. As he finishes, Detective Nelson enters, having overheard enough to end the game.

Defeated, Egan offers no resistance. Before being led away, he makes one final request: that Marian put on “When My Baby Smiles at Me” once more. To its strains—the song that symbolized his doomed obsession—Nelson escorts him out, his empire finished.

With Egan exposed, Bradford is cleared at last. He and Marian, who believed in his innocence when the world condemned him, stand free together. From the bleakness of prison has grown a love strong enough to survive betrayal, danger, and crime.

== Cast list ==
- Lloyd Hughes as Dr. Bradford
- Margaret Livingston as Marian
- Sam Hardy as Egan
- Charles West as McManus
- George Rigas as Tony
- Charles Wilson as Nelson
- Otto Hoffman as Smith
- Erville Alderson as Prison Warden (uncredited)

== Production ==
In early September 1929, it was announced that Frank Strayer had been slated to direct the picture. In late August it was announced that Lloyd Hughes, Margaret Livingston, and Sam Hardy were attached to the project. With Lloyd Hughes and Margaret Livingston already cast in the lead roles, Charles Wilson and Otto Hoffman were added to the cast in early October. The film was released on November 15, 1929.

== Reception ==
Harrison's Reports gave the film a positive review, calling it a "strong melodrama", although they found the moral of the story less than desirable, saying that "it glorifies a crook and a murderer". They felt the script and direction created an atmosphere of tense suspense. They particularly singled out the acting work of Sam Hardy. The Motion Picture News also enjoyed the film, calling it a "Good Crime Drama". They complimented Lloyd Hughes and Margaret Livingston, while saying that they were outshone by Hardy, although they felt the plot was a bit hackneyed.

== See also ==
- List of early sound feature films (1926–1929)
