= Paths to Paradise =

1925 film directed by Clarence Badger

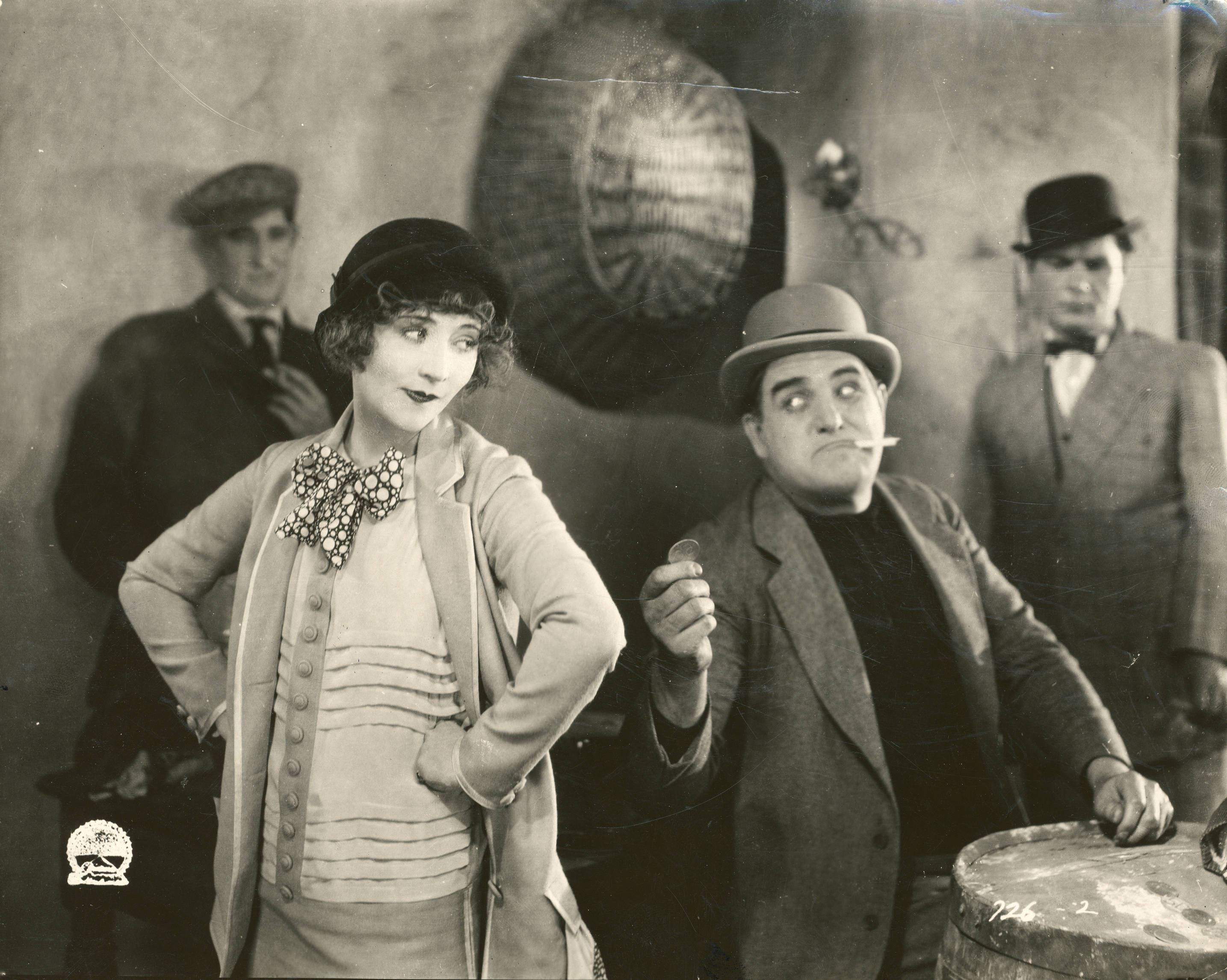
- Directed by: Clarence Badger
- Written by: Paul Armstrong (play:The Heart of a Thief); Keene Thompson (scenario)
- Produced by: Adolph Zukor; Jesse Lasky
- Starring: Raymond Griffith; Betty Compson; Thomas Santschi; Edgar Kennedy
- Cinematography: H. Kinley Martin
- Distributed by: Paramount Pictures
- Release date: June 29, 1925
- Running time: 7 reels (6,741 feet)
- Country: United States
- Language: Silent film (English intertitles)

Paths to Paradise is a 1925 silent comedy directed by Clarence Badger, produced by Famous Players–Lasky and distributed by Paramount Pictures. The film is based on a 1914 play, The Heart of a Thief, by Paul Armstrong, and stars Raymond Griffith and Betty Compson. The film was lost for many decades until an incomplete print surfaced in the 1970s. Essentially complete, the film is missing its final reel, which is usually filled in with synopsis by historians and film fans.

== Plot ==
A con man posing as an undercover detective posing as a tourist from Duluth tricks the Chinatown thief Molly into giving him all of her money as a bribe to avoid arrest. Later, they decide to team up and steal a necklace. They escape from California State Police across the Mexico–United States border into Baja California, but decide to go straight, return the necklace, and settle down.

== Cast ==
- Raymond Griffith as The Dude from Duluth
- Betty Compson as Molly
- Thomas Santschi as Chief of Detectives Callahan
- Bert Woodruff as Bride's Father
- Fred Kelsey as Confederate

uncredited

- Clem Beauchamp
