= Al Lee =

American actor

- Born: Albert Lee Cunningham; October 25, 1891; St. Louis, Missouri, U.S.
- Died: November 8, 1945 (aged 54); Manhattan, New York City, U.S.
- Occupations: Actor & producer
- Spouse: Lilyan Tashman (m. 1914; div. 1921)

Al Lee (born Albert Lee Cunningham; October 25, 1891 – November 8, 1945) was an American actor, producer and manager in vaudeville and silent films. He served for 12 years as manager for George White's Scandals and was later the company manager for the Broadway production of Tennessee Williams' The Glass Menagerie.

== Early life ==
Born in St. Louis, Missouri, Lee was the son of Georgia Lee and Albert Deering Cunningham.

== Personal life ==
In 1914, Lee married actress Lilyan Tashman, whom he had met while working on a double act with Eddie Cantor, but the couple divorced in 1921. In 1933, Lee married the daughter of "a prominent New York family," the 25-year-old Elizabeth Hopkins, daughter of the "once wealthy Angus Hopkins".

Following a brief illness, Lee died at Manhattan's Roosevelt Hospital on November 8, 1945, at age 54.

== Manager/producer ==
- The Glass Menagerie (Company Manager; March 31, 1945 - August 3, 1946)
- George White's Music Hall Varieties (General Manager; 1933)
- George White's Music Hall Varieties 1932 (General Manager; November 22, 1932 - December 31, 1932)
