= The Beloved Bachelor =

1931 film

- Lobby card
- Directed by: Lloyd Corrigan
- Screenplay by: Sidney Buchman; Raymond Griffith; Agnes Brand Leahy; Edward Peple
- Starring: Paul Lukas; Dorothy Jordan; Vivienne Osborne; Charlie Ruggles; Marjorie Gateson
- Cinematography: Charles Rosher
- Production company: Paramount Pictures
- Distributed by: Paramount Pictures
- Release date: October 24, 1931
- Running time: 72 minutes
- Country: United States
- Language: English

The Beloved Bachelor is a 1931 American pre-Code drama film directed by Lloyd Corrigan and written by Sidney Buchman, Raymond Griffith, Agnes Brand Leahy and Edward Peple. The film stars Paul Lukas, Dorothy Jordan, Vivienne Osborne, Charlie Ruggles and Marjorie Gateson. It was released on October 24, 1931, by Paramount Pictures.

== Cast ==
- Paul Lukas as Michael Morda
- Dorothy Jordan as Mitzi Stressman
- Vivienne Osborne as Elinor Hunter
- Charlie Ruggles as Jerry Wells
- Marjorie Gateson as Hortense Cole
- Harold Minjir as Winthrop Cole
- John Breeden as Jimmy Martin
- Leni Stengel as Julie Stressman
- Betty Van Allen as Mitzi Stressman, age 6
- Alma Chester as Martha
- Guy Oliver as John Adams

== Reception ==
In a contemporary review for The New York Times, critic Andre Sennwald wrote: "'The Beloved Bachelor' is skillfully produced and photographed, and it is in the best sentimental taste, but the writing is as musty as the story. It lacks surprises and it lacks freshness in the telling."
