= Someone to Love (1928 film) =

1928 film

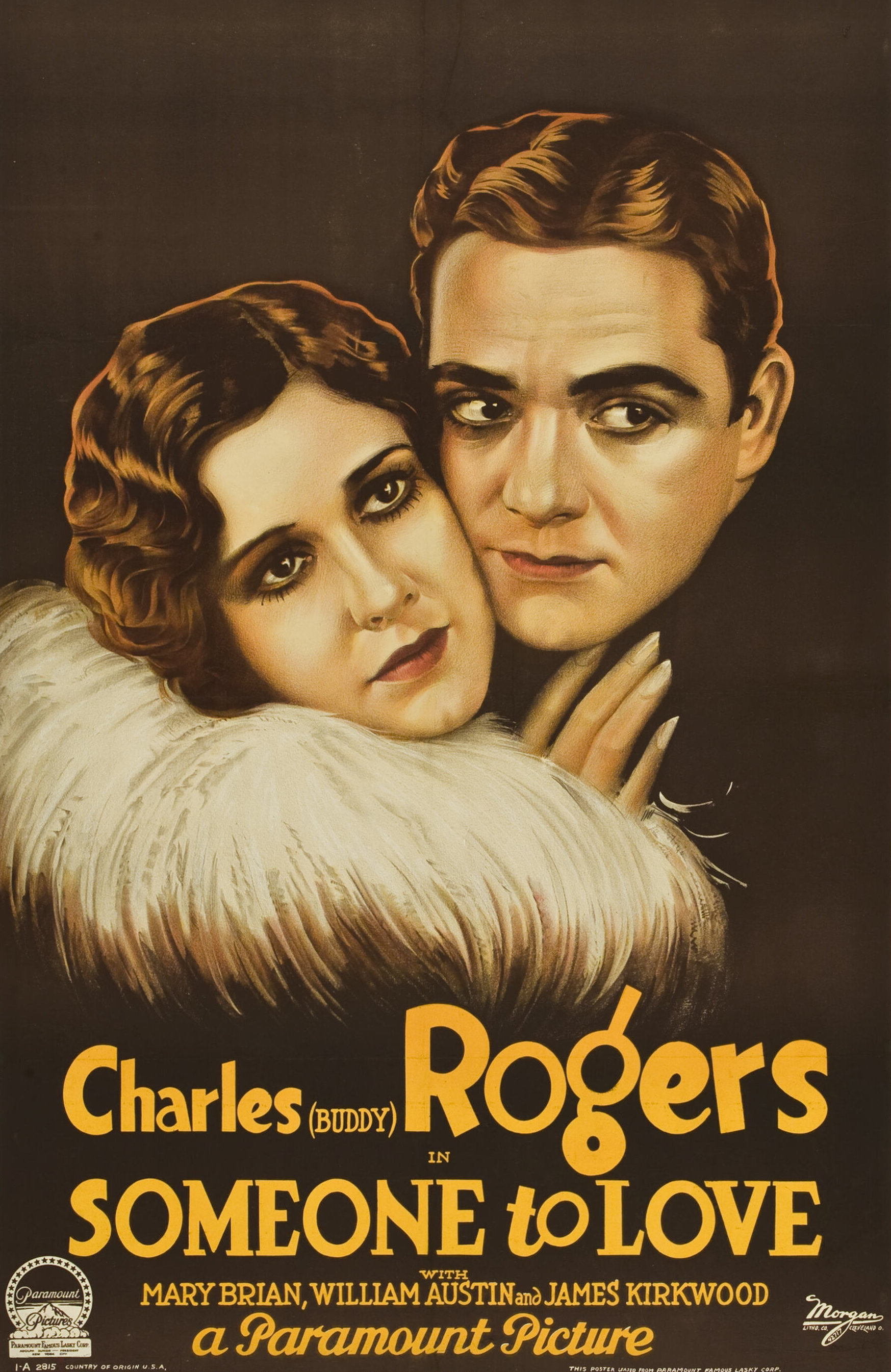
- Film poster
- Directed by: F. Richard Jones
- Screenplay by: Ray Harris; Monte Brice; Keene Thompson; George Marion Jr. Alice Duer Miller
- Produced by: Jesse L. Lasky; Adolph Zukor
- Starring: Charles "Buddy" Rogers; Mary Brian; William Austin; Jack Oakie; James Kirkwood, Sr. Mary Alden; Frank Reicher
- Cinematography: Allen G. Siegler
- Production company: Paramount Pictures
- Distributed by: Paramount Pictures
- Release date: December 1, 1928
- Running time: 58 minutes
- Country: United States
- Language: Silent (English intertitles)

Someone to Love is a 1928 American silent comedy film directed by F. Richard Jones and written by Ray Harris, Monte Brice, Keene Thompson, George Marion Jr. and Alice Duer Miller. The film stars Charles "Buddy" Rogers, Mary Brian, William Austin, Jack Oakie, James Kirkwood, Sr., Mary Alden and Frank Reicher. The film was released on December 1, 1928, by Paramount Pictures.

== Cast ==
- Charles "Buddy" Rogers as William Shelby
- Mary Brian as Joan Kendricks
- William Austin as Aubrey Weems
- Jack Oakie as Michael Casey
- James Kirkwood, Sr. as Mr. Kendricks
- Mary Alden as Harriet Newton
- Frank Reicher as Simmons

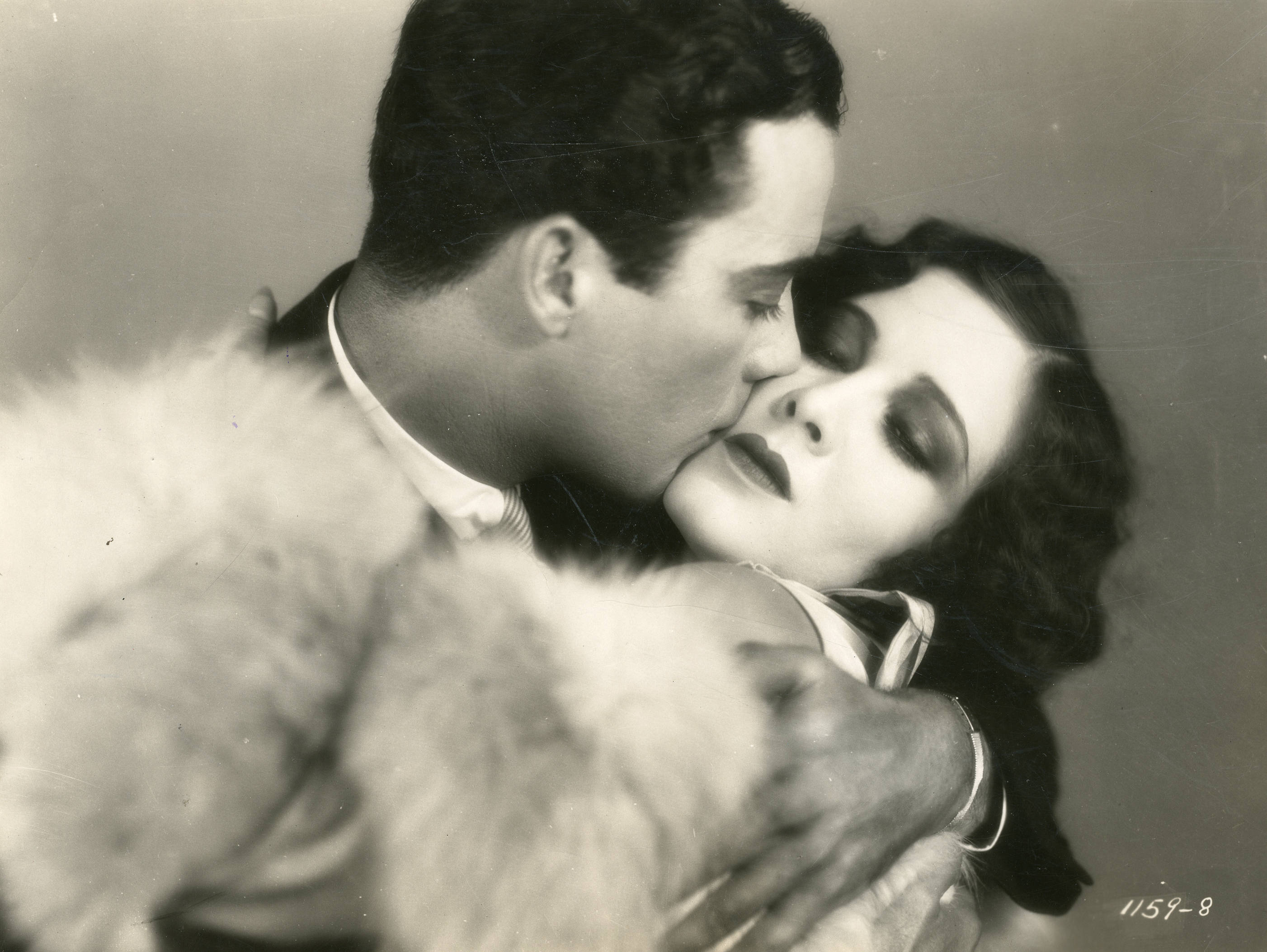
Rogers and Brian

== Preservation status ==
- This film is now lost.
