= William Austin (actor) =

English actor (1884–1975)

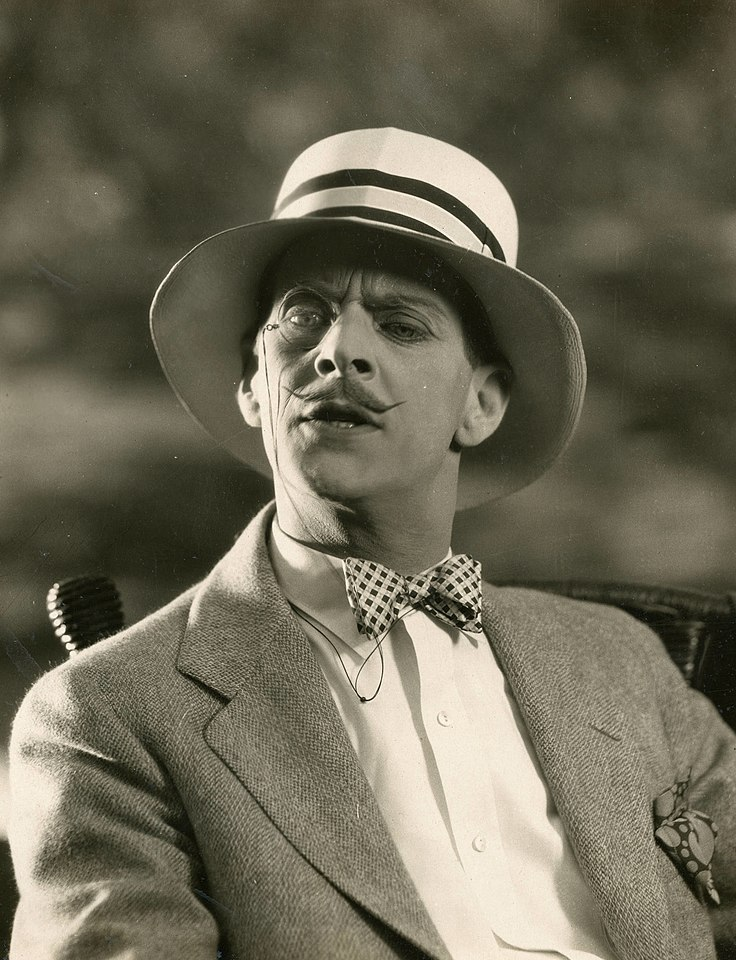
- Austin in 1925
- Born: William Crosby Percy Austin; 12 June 1884; Georgetown, British Guiana
- Died: 15 June 1975 (aged 91); Newport Beach, California, U.S.
- Resting place: Pacific View Memorial Park, Corona del Mar, California
- Occupation: Actor
- Years active: 1920–1970
- Relatives: Albert Austin (brother)

William Crosby Percy Austin (12 June 1884 – 15 June 1975) was an English character actor. He was the first actor to play Alfred in a Batman adaptation.

== Early years ==
William Austin was born in Georgetown in British Guiana. His parents were Charles Percy Austin and Rosalie Ann Sarah Austin. On the death of his father, he was brought to the United Kingdom to complete his education. He was the brother of actor Albert Austin.

Austin attended Reading College in England and gained theatrical experience via Little Theatre and Drama Shop plays.

== Career ==
Austin filled a business post in Shanghai and on being sent to San Francisco by the company he worked for, he decided to stay in America and take up acting on the stage and later in films. Beginning in 1919, Austin acted at the Morosco Theatre in Los Angeles for three years. He began working in films in 1922.

He appeared in many American films and serials between the 1920s and the 1940s, though the vast majority of his roles were small and uncredited. Of the silent films Austin appeared in, he is best remembered as the sidekick friend of Clara Bow in Bow's best known film It (1927). He supported Laurel and Hardy in two of their films, Duck Soup and County Hospital.

Austin worked as a film editor from 1928 to 1930, primarily working with Westerns.

== Batman ==
Austin portrayed Batman's butler, Alfred Pennyworth, in the 1943 Batman serial. Previous to being played by Austin, the character was fat and had no facial hair. Performed by Austin, the character was thin with a moustache. Shortly after the serial was released, Alfred in the comics was changed to match the look of the serial, which has remained consistent since.

== Death ==
Austin died at his home in Newport Beach, California, on 15 June 1975, three days after his 91st birthday, from complications following a stroke. He was buried in Pacific View Memorial Park Cemetery, Corona del Mar, Newport Beach.

== Selected filmography ==
- Common Sense (1920) – Reggie Barrett
- Handle with Care (1922) – Peter Carter
- The Cowboy King (1922) – Wilbur
- Rich Men's Wives (1922) – Reggie
- Ruggles of Red Gap (1923) – Mr. Belknap–Jackson
- The Reckless Age (1924) – Lord Harrowby
- The Garden of Weeds (1924) – Archie
- In Love with Love (1924) – George Sears
- The Night Club (1925) – Gerly – The Valet
- Who Cares (1925) – Dr. Harry Oldershaw
- Head Winds (1925) – Theodore Van Felt
- Seven Days (1925) – Dal Brown
- The Best People (1925) – Arthur Rockmere
- The Fate of a Flirt (1925) – Riggs
- What Happened to Jones (1926) – Henry Fuller
- The Far Cry (1926) – Eric Lancefield
- Fig Leaves (1926) – André's Assistant
- Collegiate (1926) – G. Horace Crumbleigh
- Her Big Night (1926) – Harold Crosby
- West of Broadway (1926) – Mortimer Allison
- The Flaming Forest (1926) – Alfred Wimbledon
- One Hour of Love (1927) – Louis Carruthers
- It (1927) – 'Monty' Montgomery
- Ritzy (1927) – Algy
- The World at Her Feet (1927) – Det. Hall
- Swim Girl, Swim (1927) – Mr. Spangle, PhD
- Silk Stockings (1927) – George Bagnall
- The Small Bachelor (1927)
- Honeymoon Hate (1927) – Banning–Green
- Drums of Love (1928) – Raymond of Boston
- Red Hair (1928) – Dr. Eustace Gill
- The Fifty-Fifty Girl (1928) – Engineer
- Just Married (1928) – Percy Jones
- Someone to Love (1928) – Aubrey Weems
- What a Night! (1928) – Percy Penfield
- The Mysterious Dr. Fu Manchu (1929) – Sylvester Wadsworth
- Illusion (1929) – Mr. Z
- Sweetie (1929) – Prof. Willow
- The Marriage Playground (1929) – Lord Wrench
- Embarrassing Moments (1929) – Jasper Hickson
- The Man from Blankley's (1930) – Mr. Poffley
- The Return of Dr. Fu Manchu (1930) – Sylvester Wadsworth
- The Flirting Widow (1930) – James Raleigh
- Let's Go Native (1930) – Basil Pistol
- Along Came Youth (1930) – Eustace
- A Tailor Made Man (1931) – Jellicott
- Corsair (1931) – Richard Bentinck
- High Society (1932) – Wilberforce Strangeways
- Don't Be a Dummy (1932) – Lord Tony Probus
- The Private Life of Henry VIII (1933) – Duke of Cleves
- Alice in Wonderland (1933) – Gryphon
- Three Men in a Boat (1933) – Harris
- Once to Every Bachelor (1934) – Mathews
- The Gay Divorcee (1934) – Cyril Glossop
- Thirty-Day Princess (1934)
- Redheads on Parade (1935) – Trelawney Redfern
- The Goose and the Gander (1935) – Arthur Summers
- $1000 a Minute (1935) – Salesman
- Renfrew of the Royal Mounted (1937) – Constable Kelly
- Doctor Rhythm (1938) – Mr. Martingale (The Floorwalker)
- The Adventures of Sherlock Holmes (1939) – Inquisitive Stranger
- Charley's Aunt (1941) – Cricket Match Spectator
- Batman (1943, Serial) – Alfred Beagle (uncredited)
- My Kingdom for a Cook (1943) – Brooks
- The Return of the Vampire (1943) – Detective Gannett
- The Ghost Goes Wild (1947) – Barnaby (final film role)
