= Love Birds (1934 film) =

1934 film by William A. Seiter

- Directed by: William A. Seiter
- Screenplay by: Doris Anderson; Henry Myers; Tom Reed
- Story by: Doris Anderson; Dale Van Every
- Produced by: Carl Laemmle, Jr.
- Starring: Slim Summerville; ZaSu Pitts; Mickey Rooney; Frederick Burton; Emmett Vogan; Dorothy Christy
- Cinematography: Norbert Brodine
- Edited by: Daniel Mandell
- Music by: Heinz Roemheld
- Production company: Universal Pictures
- Distributed by: Universal Pictures
- Release date: May 4, 1934
- Running time: 61 minutes
- Country: United States
- Language: English

Love Birds is a 1934 American pre-Code comedy film directed by William A. Seiter and written by Doris Anderson, Henry Myers, and Tom Reed. The film stars Slim Summerville, ZaSu Pitts, Mickey Rooney, Frederick Burton, Emmett Vogan, and Dorothy Christy. The film was released on May 4, 1934, by Universal Pictures.

== Cast ==
- Slim Summerville as Henry Whipple
- ZaSu Pitts as Araminta Tootle
- Mickey Rooney as Gladwyn Tootle
- Frederick Burton as Barbwire
- Emmett Vogan as Forbes
- Dorothy Christy as Kitten
- Maude Eburne as Mme. Bertha
- Ethel Mandell as Teacher
- John T. Murray as Dentist
- Craig Reynolds as Bus Driver
- Gertrude Short as Burlesque Girl
- Arthur Stone as Janitor
- Clarence Wilson as Blewitt
