= True to the Navy =

1930 film by Frank Tuttle

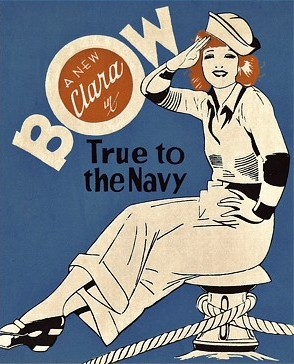
- Directed by: Frank Tuttle
- Written by: Keene Thompson; Doris Anderson; Herman J. Mankiewicz
- Starring: Clara Bow; Fredric March; Stanley "Tiny" Morner; Rex Bell
- Cinematography: Victor Milner
- Edited by: Doris Drought
- Production company: Paramount Pictures
- Distributed by: Paramount Pictures
- Release date: May 25, 1930
- Running time: 71 minutes
- Country: United States
- Language: English

True to the Navy (1930)

True to the Navy is a 1930 American pre-Code romantic comedy film directed by Frank Tuttle for Paramount Pictures. The film stars Clara Bow as a counter girl at a San Diego drugstore with a predilection for sailors. Eventually, she sets her sights on Bull's Eye McCoy (Fredric March), a stiff-necked gunner's mate.

== Cast ==
- Clara Bow as Ruby Nolan
- Fredric March as "Bull's-Eye" McCoy
- Stanley "Tiny" Morner as Bob Oldfield
- Harry Green as Solomon Bimberg
- Sam Hardy as Brady
- Rex Bell as Eddie
- Ray Cooke as Peewee
- Eddie Fetherston as Michael
- Eddie Dunn as Albert
- Adele Windsor as Maizie
- Harry Sweet as Artie

== Promotion ==
The film was promoted by the studio revue film Paramount on Parade, released in April 1930, which included "The Redhead" sequence with Bow and 42 Navy men singing "True to the Navy".

== Critical reception ==
Allmovie wrote, "the spectacle of distinguished actor Frederic March in sailor togs, chewing gum and dispensing sez-you dialogue, is worth the admission price in itself"; while The New York Times noted, "it is a moderately deserting Summer-weather film, which succeeded in eliciting a good deal of laughter at its showing yesterday."
