= Love Among the Millionaires =

1930 film

- Theatrical release poster
- Directed by: Frank Tuttle
- Screenplay by: William M. Conselman; Grover Jones; Herman J. Mankiewicz; Keene Thompson
- Starring: Clara Bow; Stanley Smith; Stuart Erwin; Richard "Skeets" Gallagher; Mitzi Green; Charles Sellon; Claude King
- Cinematography: Allen G. Siegler
- Music by: Howard Jackson
- Production company: Paramount Pictures
- Distributed by: Paramount Pictures
- Release date: July 19, 1930
- Running time: 74 minutes
- Country: United States
- Language: English

Love Among the Millionaires is a 1930 American pre-Code comedy film directed by Frank Tuttle and written by William M. Conselman, Grover Jones, Herman J. Mankiewicz and Keene Thompson. The film stars Clara Bow, Stanley Smith, Stuart Erwin, Richard "Skeets" Gallagher, Mitzi Green, Charles Sellon, and Claude King. The film was released on July 19, 1930, by Paramount Pictures.

== Cast ==
- Clara Bow as Pepper Whipple
- Stanley Smith as Jerry Hamilton
- Stuart Erwin as Clicker Watson
- Richard "Skeets" Gallagher as Boots McGee
- Mitzi Green as Penelope 'Penny' Whipple
- Charles Sellon as Pop Whipple
- Claude King as Mr. Hamilton
- Barbara Bennett as Virginia Hamilton
- Theodore von Eltz as William Jordan
