= Stanley Smith (actor) =

American film actor

- Born: Joseph Stanley Smith; January 6, 1903; Kansas City, Missouri
- Died: April 13, 1974 (aged 71); Pasadena, California, U.S.
- Occupation: Actor
- Years active: 1929–1943
- Spouse: Helen Evans
- Children: 2

Joseph Stanley Smith (January 6, 1903 – April 13, 1974) was a film actor and singer. He had leading roles opposite various other stars and featured in several musicals.

== Early life and career ==
Smith was born in Kansas City. He acted in all of the dramatic club's productions while he was a student at Hollywood High School. As a juvenile, he acted in Lenore Ulric's west coast company's production of Kiki. He went on to acti in stock theater in Houston and Omaha for three seasons before returning to the west coast.

Film studios for which Smith worked included Pathe and Paramount. He co-starred opposite Clara Bow in Love Among the Millionaires. He married Mary Lawlor in the finale of Good News. He signed with Paramount Pictures.

Smith also led an orchestra.

== Personal life and death ==
Smith was married to fellow Kansas City native, Helen Evans, with whom he had two children.

On April 13, 1974, following a lengthy illness, Smith died at his home in Pasadena, California, at age 72. Predeceased by his son, Joseph Stanley Smith Jr., he was survived by his wife and daughter.

== Filmography ==
- The Sophomore (1929)
- Sweetie (1929)
- Honey (1930)
- Paramount on Parade (1930)
- Love Among the Millionaires (1930)
- King of Jazz (1930)
- Soup to Nuts (1930), the original film featuring the Three Stooges
- Follow the Leader (1930)
- Good News (1930)
- Queen High (1930)
- Hot Saturday (1932)
- Stepping Sisters (1932)
- Hard to Handle (1933), vocalist in the band
- Reform Girl (1933)
