= Sweetie (1929 film) =

1929 film

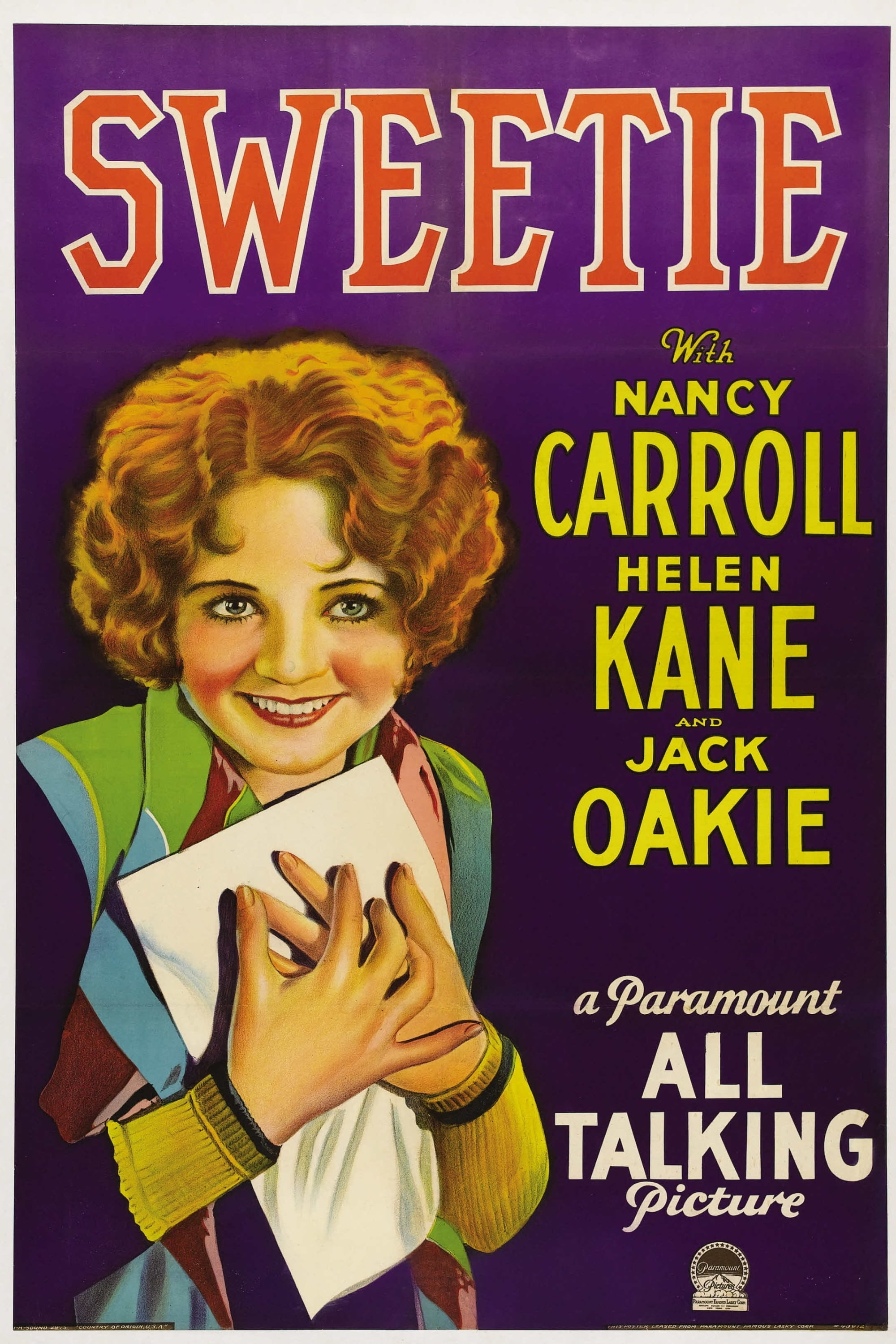
- Theatrical release poster
- Directed by: Frank Tuttle
- Screenplay by: George Marion Jr. Lloyd Corrigan
- Starring: Nancy Carroll; Helen Kane; Stanley Smith; Jack Oakie; William Austin; Stuart Erwin; Wallace MacDonald
- Cinematography: Alfred Gilks
- Edited by: Verna Willis
- Production company: Paramount Pictures
- Distributed by: Paramount Pictures
- Release date: November 2, 1929
- Running time: 95 minutes
- Country: United States
- Language: English

Sweetie is a 1929 American pre-Code musical film directed by Frank Tuttle, written by George Marion Jr. and Lloyd Corrigan, and starring Nancy Carroll, Helen Kane, Jack Oakie, William Austin, Stuart Erwin, and Wallace MacDonald. It was released on November 2, 1929, by Paramount Pictures.

== Plot ==
Sweetie (1929)

School spirit is high at Pelham University, which finally has a football team that can beat the rival school, Oglethorpe. What almost nobody knows is that Biff Bentley, the team captain, is planning to quit school to marry his chorus-girl fiancée, Barbara Pell. When, at the last minute, he's talked into staying for the good of the team, Barbara is furious that he's putting football ahead of his love for her.

It has left her in an uncomfortable position as well: She had quit a good job in order to marry him and will not be able to get that job back. Tap-Tap Thompson, her fellow Broadway performer, manages to find her a new job in a chorus, but she is so upset over her relationship with Biff that she can't learn the footwork, putting her job in jeopardy.

It is at this moment that Prof. Willow enters her life, revealing that Barbara Pell is only her stage name. Her real name is Barbara Pelham, and she has just inherited Pelham University. She immediately moves on campus to take command—and take revenge on the football team.

== Cast ==
- Nancy Carroll as Barbara Pell
- Helen Kane as Helen Fry
- Stanley Smith as Biff Bentley
- Jack Oakie as Tap-Tap Thoompson
- William Austin as Prof. Willow
- Stuart Erwin as Axel Bronstrup
- Wallace MacDonald as Bill Barington
- Charles Sellon as Dr. Oglethorpe
- Aileen Manning as Miss Twill
- Joseph Depew as Freddie Fry

== See also ==
- List of early sound feature films (1926–1929)
