= Jack Norton =

American actor (1882–1958)

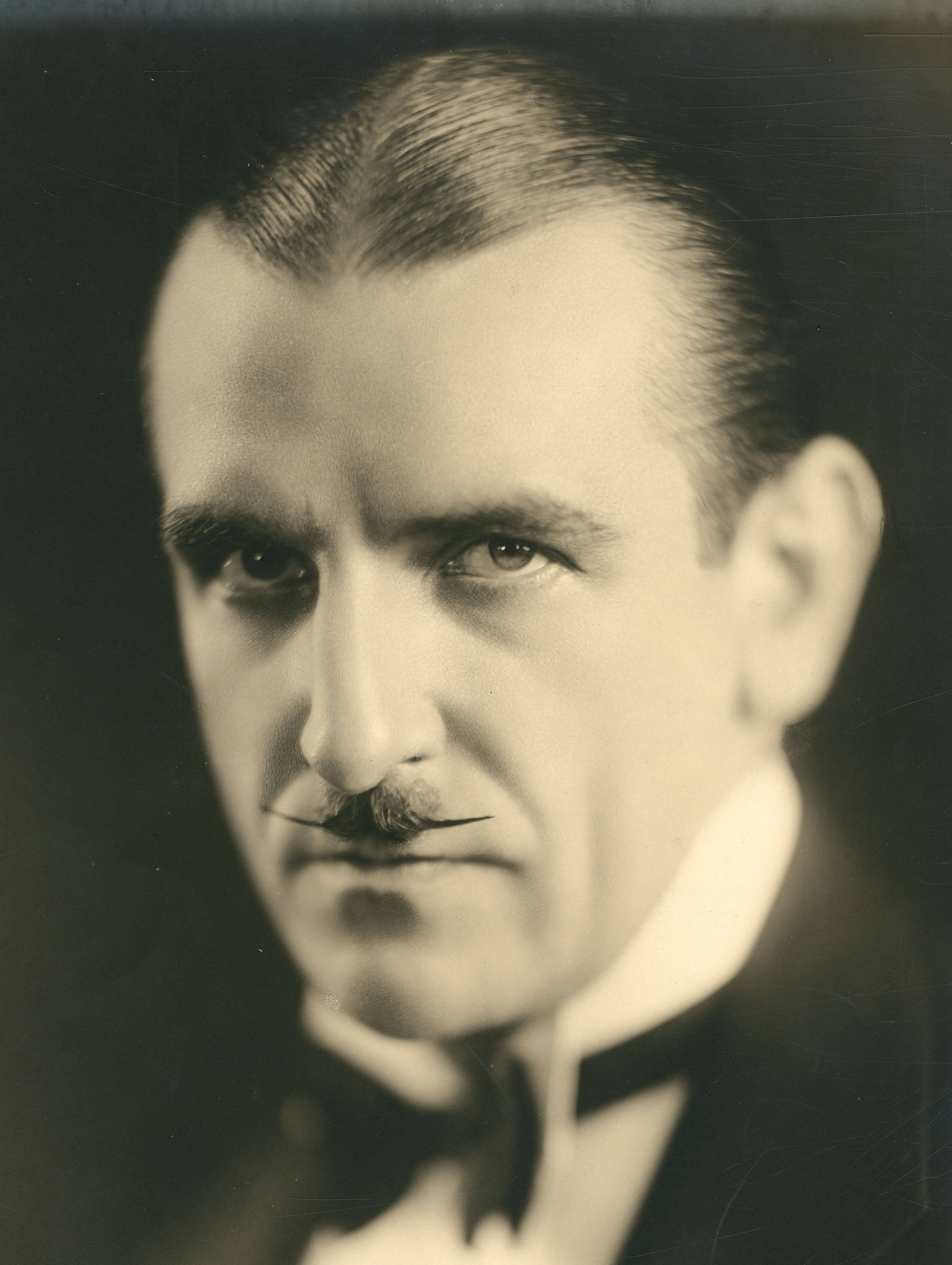
- Norton in 1927
- Born: Mortimer John Naughton; September 2, 1882; Brooklyn, New York, U.S.
- Died: October 15, 1958 (aged 76); Saranac Lake, New York, U.S.
- Occupation: Actor
- Years active: 1925–1948
- Spouse: Lucille Healy (m. 1922)

Jack Norton (born Mortimer John Naughton; September 2, 1882 – October 15, 1958) was an American stage and film character actor who appeared in more than 180 films between 1934 and 1948, often playing drunks, although in real life he was a teetotaler.

== Career ==
Norton was born in Brooklyn, New York, on September 2, 1882.

In his early career he had a vaudeville comedy act with his wife Lillian Healy, and toured as half of a comedy team with boxer "Gentleman Jim" Corbett. Norton made his Broadway debut in 1925 in that year's edition of Earl Carroll's Vanities, and also appeared in Florida Girl, which was produced and staged by Carroll.

Norton's first film work was for a musical short, School for Romance, in 1934, in which a young Betty Grable appeared, but his scenes were deleted. His work survived to reach the screen in his next assignment, The Super Snooper, a comedy short, and in his third film, his first full-length movie, Finishing School, which featured Frances Dee, Billie Burke, Ginger Rogers and Bruce Cabot, Norton played a drunk, setting the pattern for many of his future performances. Although he also played stone sober characters as well, he was best known for his inebriated characterizations, and he improved his work by following genuine drunks around, picking up behavioral tips.

Norton worked continuously and consistently, sometimes appearing in as many as 20 films in one year, although many of his performances went uncredited. One of the few times he was credited as part of the main cast was in 1945 for the film A Guy, a Gal and a Pal. In the 1940s, Norton was part of Preston Sturges' unofficial "stock company" of character actors, appearing in five films written and directed by Sturges. He is perhaps best known to modern audiences as A. Pismo Clam, the drunken film director whom W.C. Fields is hired to replace in The Bank Dick (1940).

In 1947, Norton retired from films due to illness, his last appearance being in Alias a Gentlemen, which was released in 1948, although he did make some live television appearances in the early 1950s.

Norton's final appearance would have been in the 1956 episode of The Honeymooners entitled "Unconventional Behavior", but his illness led to him being written out of the show as it was being filmed, though Jackie Gleason saw to it that Norton was paid fully for the performance he was ready, willing, but unable to give.

Norton died on October 15, 1958, in Saranac Lake, New York, at the age of 76. He is buried in Sacred Hearts Cemetery in Southampton, New York, on Long Island.

== Partial filmography ==
- Woman Haters (1934)
- Don't Bet on Blondes (1935)
- Calling All Cars (1935)
- Going Highbrow (1935)
- Ship Cafe (1935)
- Forgotten Faces (1936)
- The Moon's Our Home (1936)
- Meet the Missus (1937)
- Thanks for the Memory (1938)
- The Roaring Twenties (1939) as Drunk (uncredited)
- Laugh It Off (1939)
- The Bank Dick (1940)
- The Farmer's Daughter (1940)
- Pacific Blackout (1941)
- The Spoilers (1942)
- The Palm Beach Story (1942)
- So's Your Uncle (1943)
- Gildersleeve on Broadway (1943) (uncredited)
- The Story of Dr. Wassell (1944) (uncredited)
- Going My Way (1944) as Mr. Lilley, Music Publisher
- Prairie Chickens (1943)
- The Big Noise (1944)
- Wonder Man (1945) (uncredited)
- "The Scarlet Clue" (1945)
- " The Naughty Nineties"(1945) (uncredited)
- Man Alive (1945)
- Flame of Barbary Coast (1945)
- Rhythm and Weep (1946)--2 reel short subject
- Bringing Up Father (1946)
- Shadows Over Chinatown (1946)
