= Lone Cowboy (film) =

1933 film

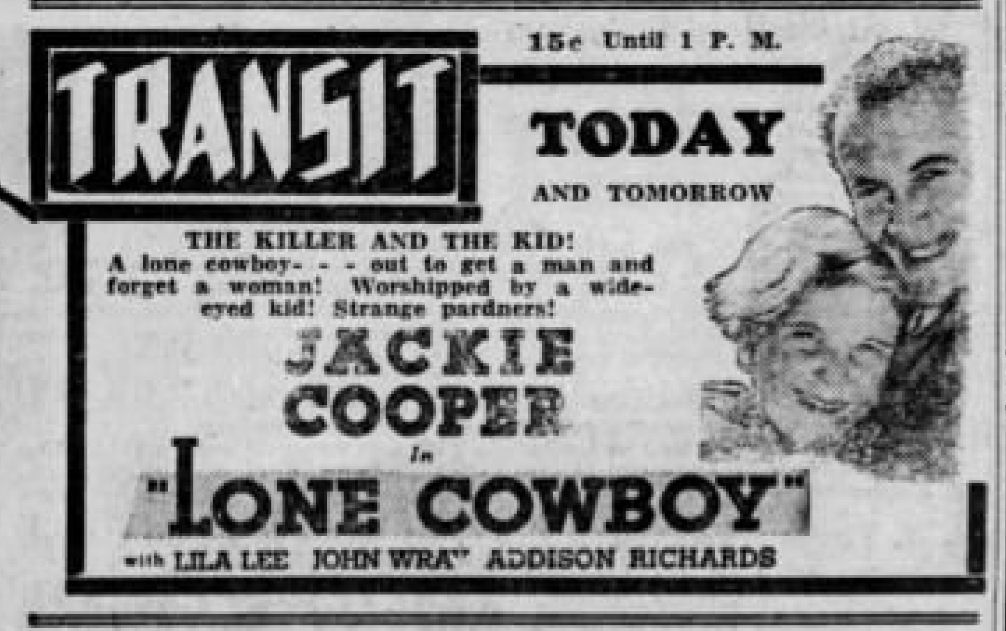
- Newspaper advertisement
- Directed by: Paul Sloane
- Screenplay by: Will James (novel); Paul Sloane; Agnes Brand Leahy; Bobby Vernon
- Produced by: Harold Hurley
- Starring: Jackie Cooper; Lila Lee; Addison Richards
- Cinematography: Theodor Sparkuhl
- Music by: Herman Hand
- Production company: Paramount Pictures
- Distributed by: Paramount Pictures
- Release date: December 1, 1933
- Running time: 64 minutes
- Country: United States
- Language: English

Lone Cowboy is a 1933 American Pre-Code Western film directed by Paul Sloane and written by Paul Sloane, Agnes Brand Leahy, Bobby Vernon, and Will James. The film stars Jackie Cooper, Lila Lee, and Addison Richards. The film was released on December 1, 1933, by Paramount Pictures.

== Plot ==
Jackie Cooper plays an orphan who travels by railroad to live on a ranch in Nevada.

== Cast ==
- Jackie Cooper as Scooter O'Neal
- Lila Lee as Eleanor Jones
- Addison Richards as Dobe Jones
- John Wray as Bill O'Neal
- Gavin Gordon as Jim Weston
- Barton MacLane as J.J. Baxter
- J. M. Kerrigan as Mr. Curran
- William Le Maire as Buck
- George C. Pearce as The Doctor
- Charles Middleton as U.S. Marshal

== Production ==
The railroad scenes were filmed on the Sierra Railroad in Tuolumne County, California.
