= Lillian Miles =

American actress

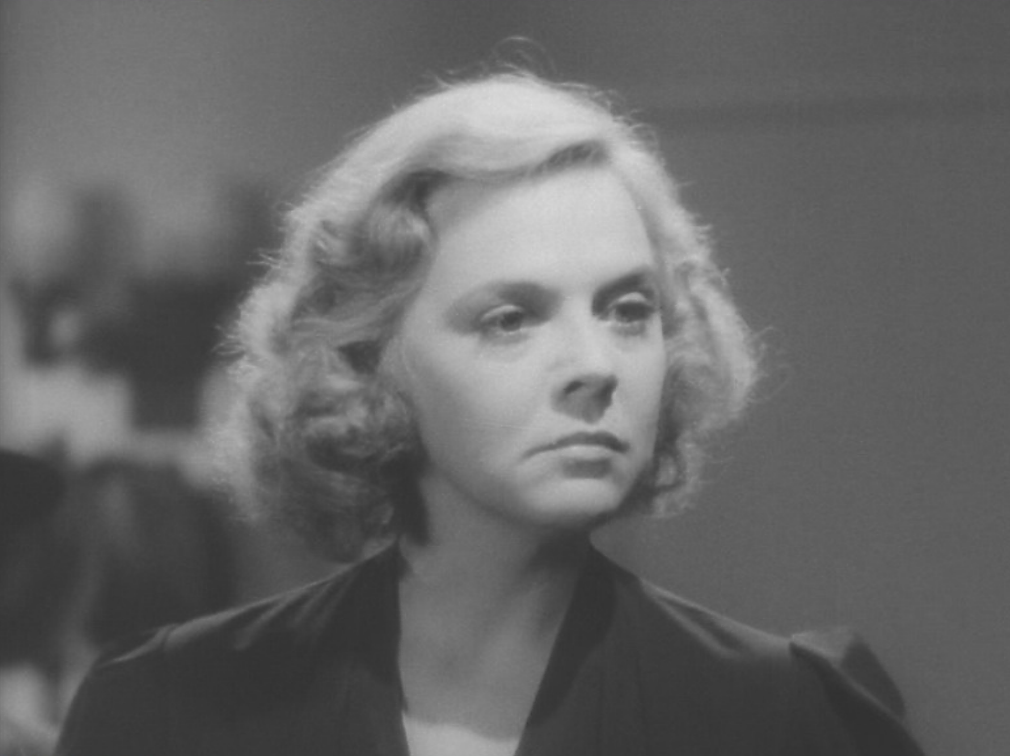
- Lillian Miles in Reefer Madness (1936)
- Born: Lillian Bradley; August 1, 1907; Oskaloosa, Iowa, U.S.
- Died: February 27, 1972 (aged 64); Yucca Valley, California, U.S.
- Resting place: Montecito Memorial Park, San Bernardino County, California
- Education: Drake University
- Years active: 1932–1953

Lillian Miles (August 1, 1907 – February 27, 1972) was an American actress in several films in the 1930s.

== Biography ==
Miles was born Lillian Bradley on a farm near Oskaloosa, Iowa, on August 1, 1907. She attended high school in Des Moines and graduated from Drake University.

Miles began singing in Des Moines, and before she acted in films she was successful as a vocalist in Boston, Hollywood, and Philadelphia.

Aside from singing and performing in the "Continental" musical number in The Gay Divorcee (1934), starring Fred Astaire and Ginger Rogers, Miles's film career was confined to low-budget 'B' pictures. However, she has something of a cult following nowadays for her performance in the anti-dope exploitation movie Reefer Madness, made in 1936. It is she who appears in the film's sequence that has her playing an increasingly frenzied piano solo while Dave O'Brien shouts "play it faster, faster!"

In December 1932, Miles appeared in person at a film theater in Kansas City while another theater there was showing one of her films. An article in The Kansas City Star about her live performance at the Mainstreet Theater said that her singing of torch songs might help to revive vaudeville. The review said, "She is pretty and her modern personality is a welcome relief" from entertainers who were seen repeatedly. Meanwhile, the review of her on-screen performance in Man Against Woman called her work as a torch singer "more than satisfying". It added, "Miss Miles can perform a hard-boiled part with sympathy and realism and her voice records beautifully."

Her last film roles were in an Edgar Kennedy short in 1939 (Baby Daze), and an uncredited bit role in Affair with a Stranger (1953), after which she retired from the screen.

Miles died on February 27, 1972, in Yucca Valley, California. She was cremated, and her remains are at Montecito Memorial Park in Colton, California.

== Partial filmography ==
- Man Against Woman (1932)
- Moonlight and Pretzels (1933)
- The Gay Divorcee (1934)
- The Knife of the Party (1934)
- The Headline Woman (1934)
- Code of the Mounted (1935)
- Get That Man (1935)
- Dizzy Dames (1935)
- Calling All Cars (1935)
- The Old Homestead (1935)
- Reefer Madness (1936)
