= Lilyan Tashman =

American actress (1896–1934)

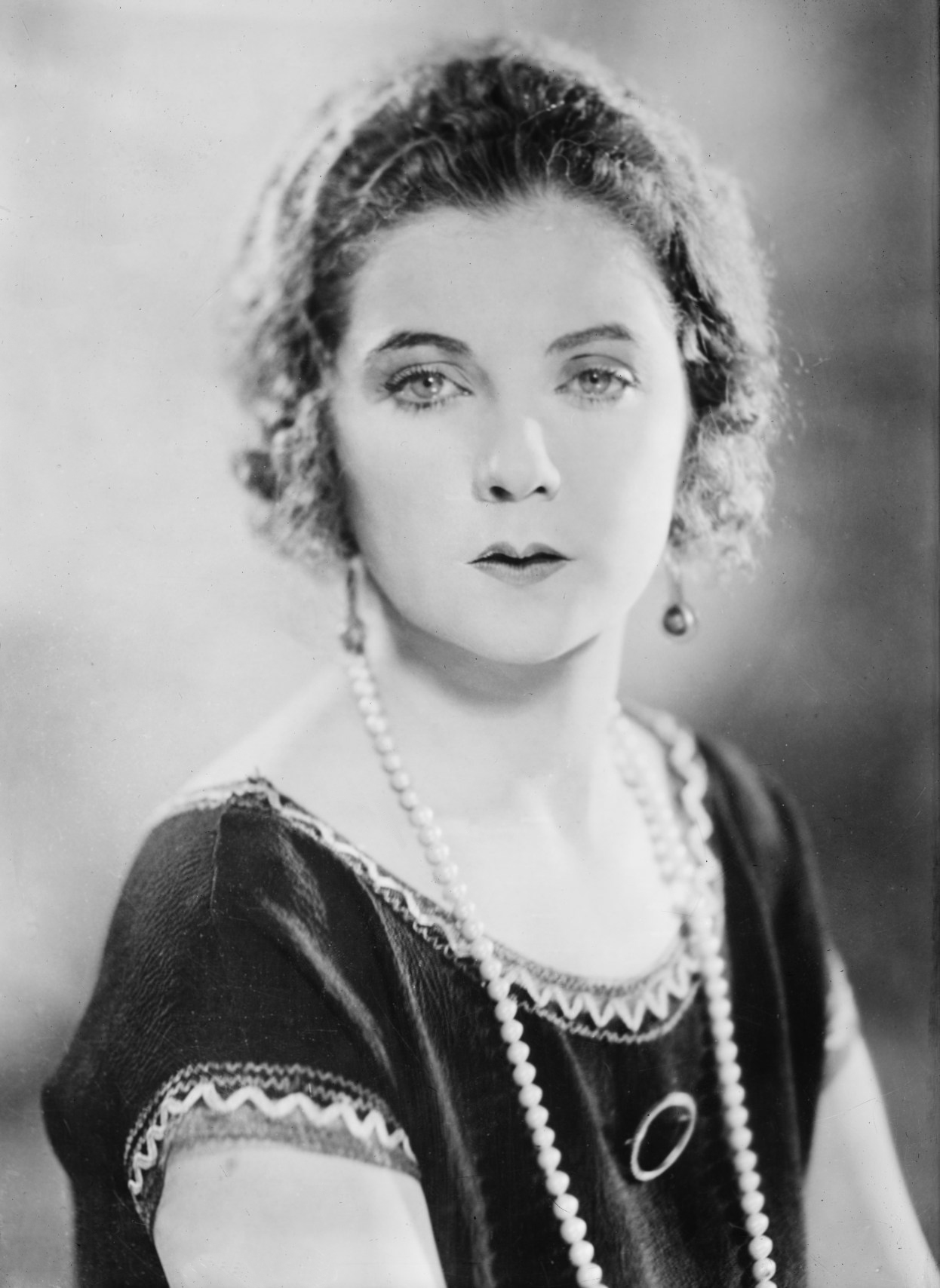
- Tashman in the 1920s
- Born: October 23, 1896; New York City, U.S.
- Died: March 21, 1934 (aged 37); New York City, U.S.
- Resting place: Washington Cemetery
- Occupation: Actress
- Years active: 1914–1934
- Spouses: Al Lee (m. 1914; div. 1921) Edmund Lowe (m. 1925)

Lilyan Tashman (October 23, 1896 – March 21, 1934) was an American stage, silent film, and sound film actress.

== Early life ==
Born Lillian Tashman in 1896 in Brooklyn, New York to a Jewish family, Tashman was the youngest of eight children, born to Morris Tashman, a manufacturer of children's clothes, and his wife, Rose Cook Tashman. Her grandparents were Isaac and Rose Schlomowitz Tashman, and her siblings were named Bertha, Kitty, Jennie, Annie, Sarah, Gustav and Hattie. She attended high school in Brooklyn and later graduated from a finishing school.

=== Early work ===
Tashman worked as a model. Her blonde hair and a unique type of beauty appealed to artists, who employed her. From her earliest recollections she yearned to appear on the stage. By 1914, she had also starting working in vaudeville, on a bill that included the up-and-coming double act Eddie Cantor and Al Lee. Tashman and Lee were married in 1914, separated in 1920, and divorced in 1921. Cantor and Lee broke up, with Cantor going on to a successful solo career, Lee going on to become a manager for George White's Scandals and Tashman trying out for whatever Broadway show she could find.

== Career ==
=== On Broadway ===
In 1913, Tashman was in the chorus of Her Little Highness. She appeared in the 1916 and 1917 Ziegfeld Follies as well a series of other Florenz Ziegfeld, Jr. musical productions, including The Century Girl (1916), Dance and Grow Thin (1917), and Miss 1917 (1917). Tashman also appeared in a number of stage comedies, including The Gold Digger (1930).

=== Entering the film business ===
Later in 1919, she was given a job by the producer David Belasco in a comedy called The Gold Diggers starring Ina Claire. The show was a success, and ran for two years and in addition to her own supporting role, Tashman acted as Claire's understudy.

In 1921, she made her first film Experience with Richard Barthelmess and Nita Naldi. After a period of misfortune in New York City in which one show closed, and she was fired from another, Tashman decided to move to Hollywood to further her film career.

On coming to Hollywood, Lilyan was cast in a supporting role in a Mabel Normand film, Head Over Heels (1922). When The Garden of Weeds (1924) came into production. Her part in the stage play secured for Lilyan the same place in the film. From then on Tashman appeared in many motion picture roles and became a prominent figure in the world of film. At first, she worked for independent film companies but later, she was featured in productions being made by the largest organizations in the industry.

=== Meeting Edmund Lowe ===
It was while acting in the film Ports of Call (1925) that the actress met her soon-to-be husband Edmund Lowe. By this time she and Al Lee had divorced. She married Lowe on September 21, 1925. The wedding occurred before the release of the film and the two made their home in Hollywood. Edmund and Lilyan resided in an Art Deco home thought to have been designed by Tashman. Both maintained their acting careers.

As a couple, Tashman and Lowe became more prominent in Hollywood than they had as single people. They entertained lavishly in their Beverly Hills home, and Tashman began appearing on "Best Dressed" lists. Their respective film careers began to improve as a result of the publicity they were beginning to generate.

Writer William J. Mann writes about their marriage in his book "Behind the Screen: How Gays and Lesbians Shaped Hollywood 1910–1969." "Marriage was an advantage for them—not so much for publicity purposes, as has been the assumption made by modern observers looking back, but rather for the greater social mobility marriage—as an institution—offered its members." "Just because both were gay shouldn't discount their affection and commitment."

=== Successful film actress ===
By 1925, Tashman had built a reasonable career as a film actress. She appeared in Pretty Ladies (Joan Crawford and Myrna Loy also taking small roles). Other film roles of note included "Seven Days" (1926), "Texas Steer" (1926), "Camille" (1927), "So This Is Paris" (1928), "Craig's Wife" (1928), "The Trial of Mary Dugan" (1929), "The Marriage Playground" (1929), and "The Gold Diggers of Broadway" (1929), and the pre-Production Code comedy "Girls About Town" (1931).

Over the next few years, Tashman appeared in numerous supporting roles, and several starring roles and, with the advent of talking pictures, made an easy transition. She had a rich contralto voice and a confident delivery of dialogue after years spent on the stage.

== Declining health and death ==
After a busy year in 1931 in which Tashman appeared in eight films, she began to reduce her work schedules while newspapers speculated about the state of her health. After denying repeatedly that there was a problem with her health, Tashman was eventually hospitalized, and upon her release answered further rumors with a statement saying that she had undergone an appendectomy. It was only when she died soon after, that it was revealed she had died of cancer. Hospital authorities described the cause of her death as an advanced tumorous condition. She was conscious until the end according to A.J. Gertenbach, managing director of the hospital. Edmund Lowe was beside her bed as she died. The couple lived in New York at 73 East 70th Street.

=== Funeral in New York City ===
Tashman was 37 years old when she died at 2:15 at Doctor's Hospital, 170 East End Avenue, on March 21, 1934. She had undergone an operation the previous Friday. Rabbi Rev. Dr. Samuel H. Goldenson of Temple Emanu-El performed the funeral service at the Universal Funeral Chapel, 597 Lexington Avenue in New York City. Tashman was later interred at the plot of the Palestine Lodge 71, I.O.S.B., Washington Cemetery, Brooklyn, New York.

== Filmography ==
Year	Title	Role	Notes
1921	Experience	Pleasure	First feature film Lost film
1922	Head Over Heels	Efith Penfield	
1924	Nellie, the Beautiful Cloak Model	Nita	
1924	Manhandled	Pinkie Moran	
1924	Winner Take All	Felicity Brown	Lost film
1924	The Garden of Weeds	Hazel	Lost film
1924	The Dark Swan	Sybil Johnson	Lost film
1924	Is Love Everything?	Edythe Stanley	
1925	Ports of Call	Lillie	Lost film
1925	The Parasite	Laura Randall	
1925	Declassée	Mrs. Leslie	
1925	A Broadway Butterfly	Thelma Perry	Lost film
1925	I'll Show You the Town	Fan Green	
1925	Pretty Ladies	Selma Larson	Film survives, but the color sequences are lost
1925	The Girl Who Wouldn't Work	Greta Verlaine	
1925	Seven Days	Bella Wilson	Lost film
1925	Bright Lights	Gwen Gould	Lost film
1926	Rocking Moon	Sasha Larianoff	
1926	The Skyrocket	Ruby Wright	Lost film
1926	Whispering Smith	Marion Sinclair	
1926	Siberia	Beautiful Blonde	Lost film
1926	So This Is Paris	Georgette Lalle, a dancer	
1926	For Alimony Only	Narcissa Williams	
1926	Love's Blindness	Alice, Duchess of Lincolnwood	Lost film
1926	Camille	Olympe	Incomplete film
1927	Don't Tell the Wife	Suzanna	
1927	Evening Clothes	Minor Role	Lost film Uncredited
1927	The Woman Who Did Not Care	Iris Carroll	
1927	The Prince of Headwaiters	Mae Morin	Lost film
1927	The Stolen Bride	Ilona Taznadi	
1927	A Texas Steer	Dixie Style	Lost film
1927	French Dressing	Peggy Nash	Lost film
1928	Craig's Wife	Mrs. Passmore	Lost film
1928	Happiness Ahead	Kay Sears	Lost film
1928	Phyllis of the Follies	Mrs. Decker	
1928	Lady Raffles	Lillian	
1928	Take Me Home	Derelys Devore	Lost film
1928	Manhattan Cocktail	Mrs. Renov	Lost film
1929	A Real Girl	Minnie	
1929	The Lone Wolf's Daughter	Velma	Lost film
1929	The Trial of Mary Dugan	Dagmar Lorne	
1929	Bulldog Drummond	Irma Peterson	
1929	Gold Diggers of Broadway	Eleanor	Incomplete film
1929	The Marriage Playground	Joyce Wheater	
1929	New York Nights	Peggy	
1930	No, No, Nanette	Lucille Early	Lost film, only the soundtrack survives
1930	Puttin' On the Ritz	Goldie Devere	Film survives, but it has been cut down by twenty minutes, the title cards at the start and end have been edited and altered, and the technicolor sequences partially survive in only black-and-white
1930	On the Level	Lynn Crawford	
1930	The Matrimonial Bed	Sylvaine	
1930	Leathernecking	Edna	Lost
1930	The Cat Creeps	Cicily	Lost film
1931	One Heavenly Night	Fritzi Vajos	
1931	Finn and Hattie	The 'Princess'	
1931	Millie	Helen 'Hel' Riley	
1931	Up Pops the Devil	Polly Griscom	
1931	Murder by the Clock	Laura Endicott	
1931	The Mad Parade	Lil Wheeler	Forgotten Women (US re-release title)
1931	The Road to Reno	Mrs. Jackie Millet	
1931	Girls About Town	Marie Bailey	
1932	The Wiser Sex	Claire Foster	
1932	Those We Love	Valerie	
1932	Scarlet Dawn	Vera Zimina	
1933	Wine, Women and Song	Frankie Arnette	
1933	Mama Loves Papa	Mrs. McIntosh	
1933	Too Much Harmony	Lucille Watkins	
1934	Riptide	Sylvia Wilson	released posthumously
1936	Frankie and Johnnie	Nellie Bly	released posthumously
