= Calling All Cars (1935 film) =

1935 film directed by Spencer Gordon Bennet

- Directed by: Spencer Gordon Bennet
- Written by: George Morgan; Betty Burbridge
- Produced by: Spencer Gordon Bennet; Lester F. Scott Jr.
- Starring: Jack La Rue; Lillian Miles; Jack Norton
- Cinematography: James S. Brown Jr.
- Edited by: Fred Bain
- Production company: Empire Pictures
- Distributed by: Empire Pictures
- Release date: January 25, 1935
- Running time: 67 minutes
- Country: United States
- Language: English

Calling All Cars is a 1935 American crime film directed by Spencer Gordon Bennet and starring Jack La Rue, Lillian Miles and Jack Norton. It was originally made for distribution by Mayfair Pictures, but the company had ceased business by the time of its release.

== Cast ==
- Jack La Rue as Jerry Kennedy
- Lillian Miles as Kay Larson
- Jack Norton as Duke Costello
- Eddie Fetherston as Marty Blake / Marty Dempsey
- Harry Holman as Judge Marlowe
- Ernie Adams as Reporter
- Arthur Millett as Policeman

== Bibliography ==
- Pitts, Michael R. Poverty Row Studios, 1929–1940: An Illustrated History of 55 Independent Film Companies, with a Filmography for Each. McFarland & Company, 2005.
