= The Night Club (film) =

1925 film

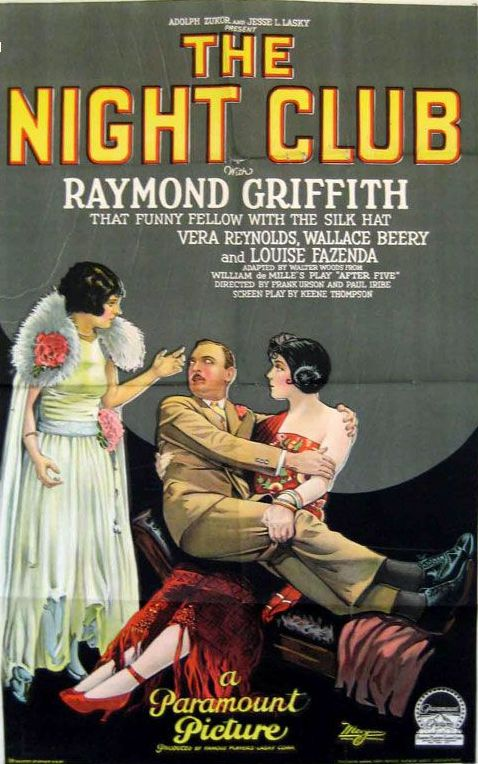
- Film poster
- Directed by: Paul Iribe; Frank Urson
- Screenplay by: Cecil B. DeMille; Keene Thompson; Walter Woods; William C. deMille
- Produced by: Jesse L. Lasky; Adolph Zukor
- Starring: Raymond Griffith; Vera Reynolds; Wallace Beery; Louise Fazenda; William Austin
- Cinematography: J. Peverell Marley
- Production company: Famous Players–Lasky Corporation
- Distributed by: Paramount Pictures
- Release date: April 27, 1925
- Running time: 60 minutes
- Country: United States
- Language: Silent (English intertitles)

The Night Club is a 1925 American silent comedy film directed by Paul Iribe and Frank Urson and written by Cecil B. DeMille, Keene Thompson, Walter Woods, and William C. deMille. The film stars Raymond Griffith, Vera Reynolds, Wallace Beery, Louise Fazenda, and William Austin. The film was released on April 27, 1925, by Paramount Pictures.

== Plot ==
Bob White is a bitter misogynist who operates an organization of committed bachelors called the Night Club. Bob's financé had deserted him at the altar, prompting his vow to never wed. Bob eventually learns that he will inherit $1 million if he marries a certain unidentified woman. That woman is Grace Henderson. Bob says that he is not interested.

Some time later, Bob meets Grace by chance and falls in love with her. He doesn't know about Grace, but she knows about him. She tells Bob that she is the unidentified woman in the will and rejects him, saying that he wants her only for the money. Heartbroken, Bob discovers that if he dies, the inheritance will go to Grace. He then tries multiple unsuccessful attempts to kill himself. Grace finally realizes that Bob really loves her and stops his suicide attempts. She agrees to marry him.

== Cast ==
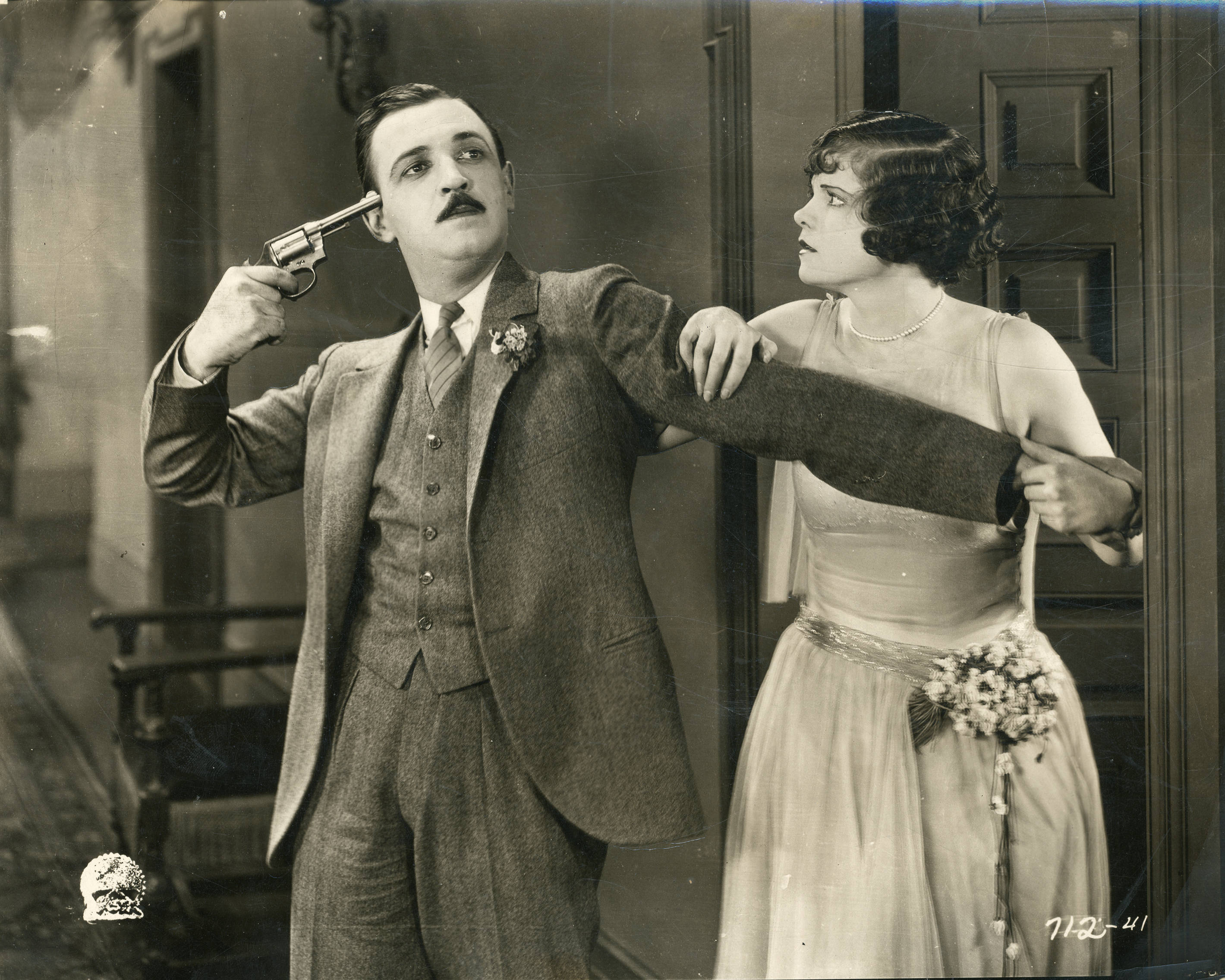
Griffith and Reynolds

- Raymond Griffith as Robert White
- Vera Reynolds as Grace Henderson
- Wallace Beery as Josy
- Louise Fazenda as Carmen
- William Austin as Gerl

uncredited

- Edythe Chapman as Miss Perkins

== Preservation ==
The Cineteca Del Friulli, the Library of Congress, the UCLA Film and Television Archive, The George Eastman Museum, and the Pacific Film Archive all hold prints of this film.
