= Man Against Woman =

1932 film

- Directed by: Irving Cummings
- Written by: Keene Thompson; Jo Swerling
- Starring: Jack Holt; Lillian Miles; Walter Connolly
- Cinematography: Ted Tetzlaff
- Production company: Columbia Pictures
- Distributed by: Columbia Pictures
- Release date: November 15, 1932
- Running time: 70 minutes
- Country: United States
- Language: English

Man Against Woman is a 1932 American pre-Code crime film directed by Irving Cummings and starring Jack Holt, Lillian Miles (in her first starring role) and Walter Connolly. The film was originally known as Plainclothes Man.

== Plot ==
Tough New York cop Johnny McCloud falls in love with nightclub singer Lola Parker, but she seems more involved with gangster George Perry.

== Cast ==
- Jack Holt as Johnny McCloud
- Lillian Miles as Lola Parker
- Walter Connolly as Mossie Ennis
- Gavin Gordon as George Perry
- Arthur Vinton as Happy O'Neill
- Jack La Rue as Alberti
- Clarence Muse as Smoke Johnson
- Emmett Corrigan as Christy
- Harry Seymour as Brodie
- Kathrin Clare Ward as Landlad

== Critical reception ==
In his review of the film in The New York Times, film critic Mordaunt Hall wrote that the "exploits in this tale are scarcely credible, but the film affords some unconscious amusement." Regarding the actors, Hall wrote that "Holt is miscast in the part of the sleuth," "Connolly [...] gives an excellent performance, which at least atones for some of the shortcomings in the film," and that "Miles is acceptable as the torch singer."

== Bibliography ==
- Langman, Larry & Finn, Daniel. A Guide to American Crime Films of the Thirties. Greenwood Press, 1995.
