= Mama Loves Papa (1933 film) =

1933 film by Norman Z. McLeod

- 1933 theatrical poster
- Directed by: Norman Z. McLeod
- Screenplay by: Arthur Kober; Douglas MacLean; Keene Thompson
- Story by: Nunnally Johnson; Douglas MacLean
- Starring: Charlie Ruggles; Mary Boland; Lilyan Tashman; George Barbier
- Cinematography: Gilbert Warrenton
- Edited by: Richard C. Currier
- Production company: Paramount Pictures
- Release date: July 14, 1933 (United States)
- Running time: 68 minutes
- Country: United States
- Language: English

Mama Loves Papa is a 1933 American pre-Code comedy film directed by Norman Z. McLeod, with a story by Nunnally Johnson and Douglas MacLean, and a screenplay by MacLean, Keene Thompson, and Arthur Kober. The film was produced by Paramount Pictures and stars Charlie Ruggles and Mary Boland.

== Plot ==
While Wilbur Todd is content with his middle class life, his wife Jessie aspires to a higher social standing. She insists he wear fine clothes because she believes that clothes make the man. When his strange new clothes bring derision rather than admiration, and tired of his wife's constant nagging, Wilbur goes off on a drunken spree and innocently becomes involved with the village vamp, Mrs. McIntosh.

== Cast ==
- Charlie Ruggles as Wilbur Todd
- Mary Boland as Jessie Todd
- Lilyan Tashman as Mrs. McIntosh
- George Barbier as Mr. Kirkwood
- Walter Catlett as Tom Walker
- Morgan Wallace as Mr. McIntosh
- George Beranger as Basil Pew
- Tom Ricketts as Mr. Pierrepont
- Warner Richmond as The Radical
- Frank Sheridan as The Mayor
- Tom McGuire as O'Leary
- Gail Patrick (uncredited)

== Reception ==
The New York Times wrote that Ruggles' "routine comedy method is so uproarious that it is in danger of obscuring his other talents" and that as Wilbur Todd he "produces an authentic and believable character in the principal role, playing down his scenes with admirable restraint." They wrote that as Wilbur's well-meaning wife Jessie, Mary Boland "is a comedienne who successfully resists the temptation to manufacture broad farce and easy laughs."

In the Toledo News-Bee journalist Allen Saunders made note that actor Charles Ruggles had been so long identified with sight and sound humor, that audiences had nearly forgotten that he could speak, and that in Mama Loves Papa he "has a chance to do a good job and he does it." In describing the supporting cast and action, he wrote that with the team of Charles Ruggles and Mary Boland, the film was in "capable hands". He concluded by writing that "Mama Loves Papa is one of the best little comedies of the season". San Jose News wrote that the film was "an effervescent farce", that is "a perfect satire on the family next door."

Hal Erickson of Rovi wrote that the team of Mary Boland and Charles Ruggles collaborating with Norman Z. McLeod made for a delightful film. Noting that the film was "very basic material", he wrote that because of its stars, director, and screenwriter Nunnally Johnson, the film "emerges as something truly special." He also made note that the National Board of Review selected the film as one of the best of its year.

== Recognition ==
- 1933, nomination for Best Picture by National Board of Review

== See also ==
- Mama Loves Papa, 1945 adaptation
