= French Dressing (1927 film) =

1927 film by Allan Dwan

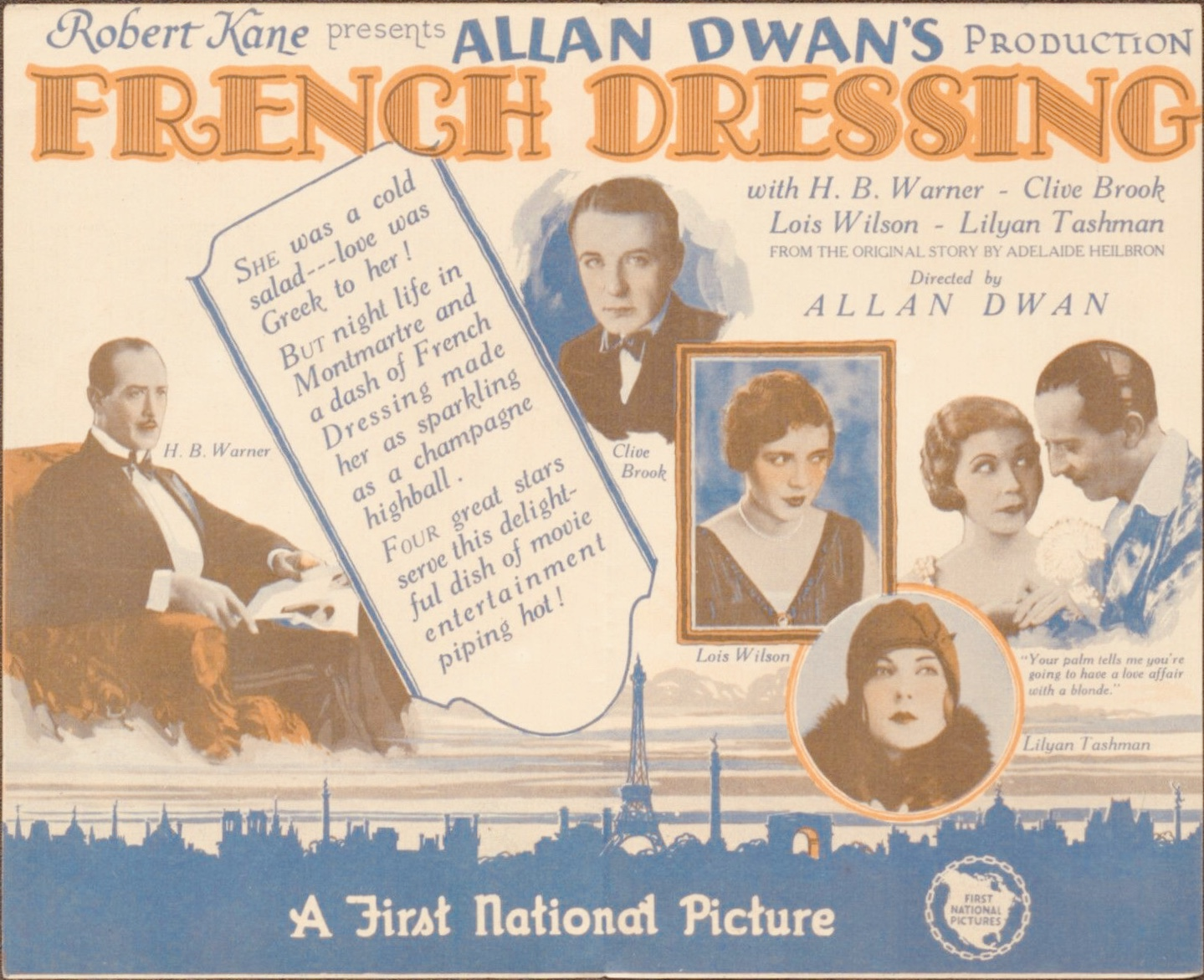
- Lobby Card for the film
- Directed by: Allan Dwan
- Written by: J. L. Campbell(scenario); Pauline Forney(continuity
- Based on: story by Adelaide Heilbron
- Produced by: Allan Dwan; Robert Kane
- Starring: H.B. Warner; Clive Brook; Lois Wilson; Lilyan Tashman
- Cinematography: Ernest Haller
- Edited by: Terrell Morse (aka Terry O. Morse)
- Distributed by: First National Pictures
- Release date: December 10, 1927; (NY premiere
- Running time: 6344 feet
- Country: United States
- Language: Silent (English intertitles)

French Dressing is a 1927 American silent romantic comedy film directed by Allan Dwan and starring H. B. Warner. It was produced and distributed by First National Pictures.

== Cast ==
- H. B. Warner as Phillip Grey
- Clive Brook as Henri de Briac
- Lois Wilson as Cynthia Grey
- Lilyan Tashman as Peggy Nash

=== Uncredited ===
- Tim Holt
- Hedda Hopper

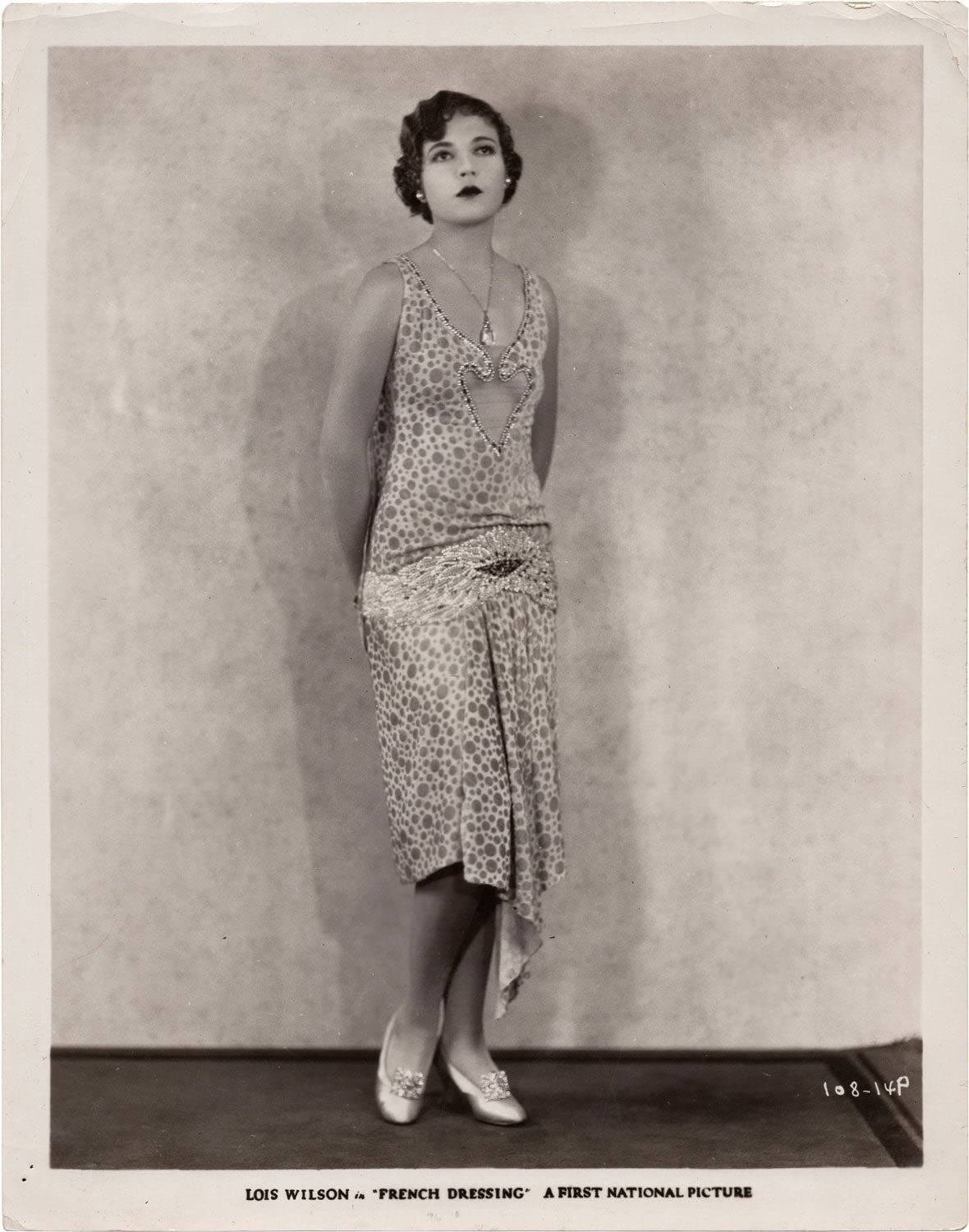
Wilson in a publicity photo for the film

== Production ==
In their October 1927 edition, Photoplay magazine reported that Claudette Colbert and Ben Lyon were originally set to star. It is unknown why they were replaced.

== Preservation ==
With no prints of French Dressing located in any film archives, it is a lost film.
