= Edward E. Paramore Jr. =

American screenwriter

Edward E. Paramore Jr. (17 September 1895 – 1 May 1956) was an American screenwriter.

== Career ==
His 1929 play Ringside, co-written with George Abbott and Hyatt Daab, was adapted for the movie Night Parade by RKO. He was a staff screenwriter at Paramount. He wrote the script for the film The Bitter Tea of General Yen for Columbia, Baby Take a Bow and Chetniks! The Fighting Guerrillas for 20th Century Fox, and Man of Conquest for Republic. He retired in 1943.

He was one of the founders of the Screen Actors Guild.

Paramore died from a skull fracture stemming from an accident in a parking garage in Shreveport, Louisiana.

His son Edward E. Paramore III produced under the name Harold Lime.

== Filmography ==
- Chetniks! The Fighting Guerrillas (1943)
- Tombstone, the Town Too Tough to Die (1942)
- Mystery Sea Raider (1940)
- 20 Mule Team (1940)
- Man of Conquest (1939)
- The Oklahoma Kid (1939)
- Three Comrades (1938)
- Portia on Trial (1937)
- Two in a Crowd (1936)
- Trouble for Two (1936)
- Three Godfathers (1936)
- The Farmer Takes a Wife (1935)
- Rocky Mountain Mystery (1935)
- Mystery Woman (1935)
- Baby Take a Bow (1934)
- Master of Men (1933)
- The Bitter Tea of General Yen (1933)
- Rich Man's Folly (1931)
- Newly Rich (1931)
- Fighting Caravans (1931)
- The Santa Fe Trail (1930)
- The Border Legion (1930)
- Only the Brave (1930)
- The Virginian (1929)
- Night Parade (1929)
- The Saturday Night Kid (1929)
- A Dangerous Woman (1929)
