= Mama Loves Papa (1945 film) =

1945 film by Frank R. Strayer

- theatrical poster
- Directed by: Frank R. Strayer
- Written by: Monte Brice
- Screenplay by: Charles E. Roberts
- Story by: Keene Thompson
- Based on: Mama Loves Papa (1933 film) by Douglas MacLean
- Produced by: Benjamin Stoloff
- Starring: Leon Errol; Elisabeth Risdon; Edwin Maxwell; Emory Parnell
- Cinematography: Jack MacKenzie
- Edited by: Edward W. Williams
- Music by: Leigh Harline
- Production company: RKO Radio Pictures
- Distributed by: RKO Radio Pictures (1945 theatrical); C&C Television Corp.
- Release date: August 8, 1945 (United States)
- Running time: 60 minutes
- Country: United States
- Language: English

Mama Loves Papa is a 1945 American comedy film directed by Frank R. Strayer and written by Monte Brice, with a story by Keene Thompson and a screenplay by Charles E. Roberts. It is a loose remake of the 1933 film Mama Loves Papa, written by Douglas MacLean. The film was produced by RKO Radio Pictures and stars Leon Errol and Elizabeth Risdon.

== Plot ==
Wilbur is a middle-class furniture store employee. His wife Jessie reads a book about how women can make their men more successful, and she decides to remake her husband to give him a new image. Now dressed-for-success by his wife, Wilbur reports for work in fancy clothes. Thinking he is dressed for a funeral, his boss, sends Wilbur home for the day. When Wilbur is wandering perplexed in a nearby park, he is mistaken for the park commissioner. Seeing it as an opportunity, McIntosh, a crooked politician who wishes to land a lucrative deal with the city to sell them new playground equipment, has the mayor appoint Wilbur as "playground commissioner". Later, when Wilbur is about to denounce McIntosh as a crook, McIntosh has his wife ply Wilbur with champagne. While Wilbur is tipsy, Jessie overhears a flirtatious and damning conversation between the two. Wilbur wakes up with a hangover and no pants, and he learns that, while intoxicated, he brought disgrace to himself, the town, and his wife. Wilbur eventually exposes the political corruption, and when his wife finally agrees to let him leave politics, everything turns out okay.

== Cast ==
- Leon Errol as Wilbur Todd
- Elisabeth Risdon as Jessie Todd
- Edwin Maxwell as Kirkwood
- Emory Parnell as O'Leary
- Charles Halton as Appleby
- Paul Harvey as Mr. McIntosh
- Charlotte Wynters as Mrs. McIntosh
- Ruth Lee as Mabel
- Lawrence Tierney as Sharpe

Additional characters

- Florence Auer as Madame Dalba
- Tom Chatterton as Speaker
- Charlie Hall as Bartender
- Tom McGuire as Chief of Police
- Jack Richardson as Gentleman
- Jason Robards Sr. as Playground Policeman
- Robert Middlemass as The Mayor
- Don Douglas as Secretary
- Max Wagner as City Official
- Frank O'Connor as City Official

== Background ==
RKO bought the film rights to Paramount's 1933 film for $85,000. Two actors who had been in the 1933 version of this film returned to this 1945 remake in different roles. Tom McGuire who earlier played the character of O'Leary returned as the chief of police, and Ruth Warren who earlier played the role of Sara Walker returned as Mabel.

== Critical reception ==
Waycross Journal-Herald wrote that the film was the "hilarious results of domesticity gone wild". Conversely, TV Guide wrote that RKO created "a film worth about $5" when RKO after butting Paramount's 1933 film for $85,000. Hal Erickson of Rovi wrote that, with a change in plot devices and modification of script, the film was only a "loose remake of the 1935 Charlie Ruggles-Mary Boland comedy of the same name," and he notes the sole redeeming feature to be Leon Errol's "rubber legs" routine already familiar to his fans.
