= Keene Thompson =

American screenwriter

- Born: Robert Keene Thompson; November 15, 1885; Minneapolis, Minnesota
- Died: July 11, 1937 (aged 51); Hollywood, California
- Resting place: Forest Lawn Memorial Park, Glendale, CA
- Occupations: Story writer Scenario writer Screenwriter
- Years active: 1920–1937
- Children: 3 (deceased)

Keene Thompson (November 15, 1885, in Minneapolis, Minnesota – July 11, 1937, in Hollywood, California) was a story, scenario and screenwriter who worked in the film industry from 1920 to 1937.

== Career ==
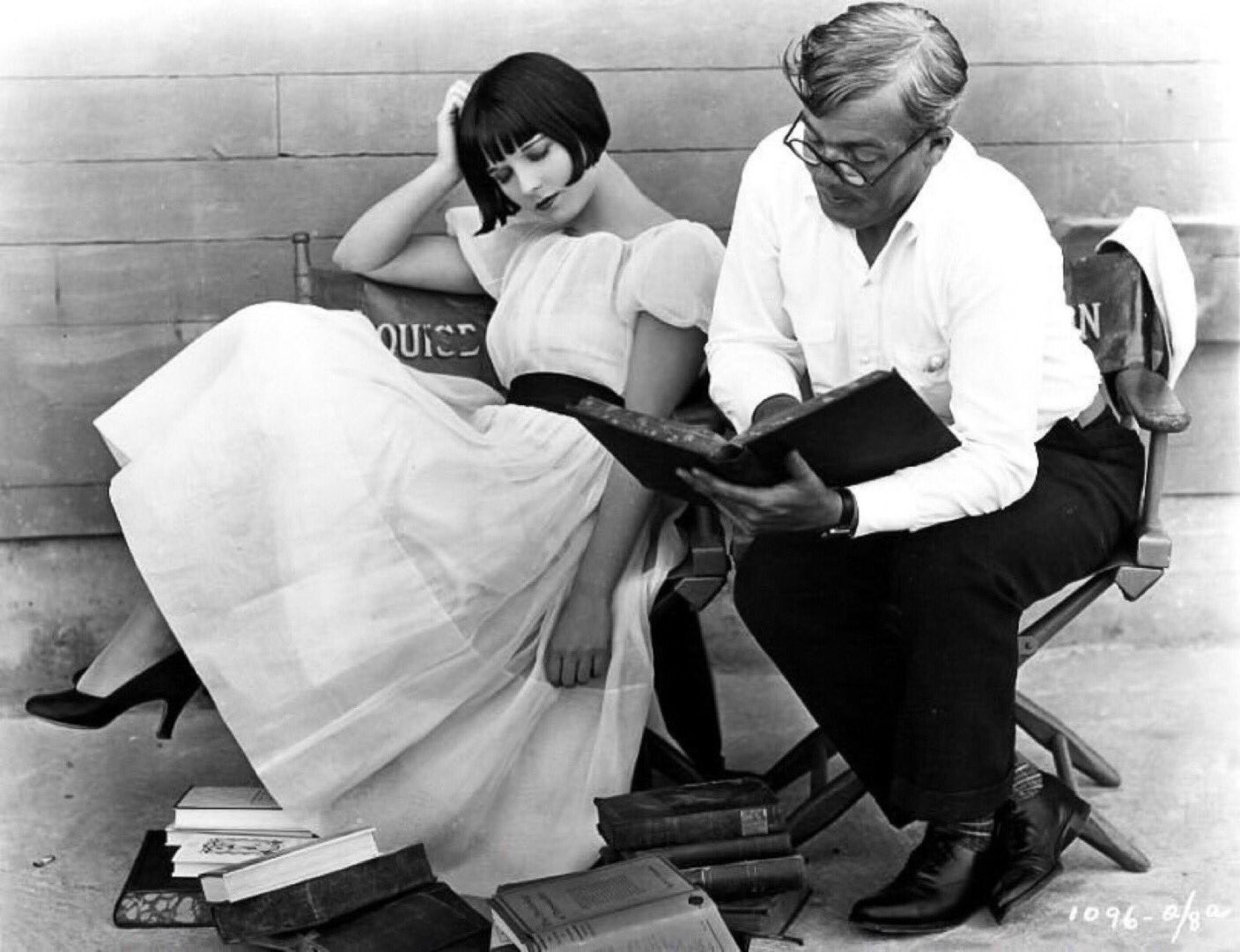
Louise Brooks and Keene Thompson, 1927

Thompson had a small acting role in the 1917 Douglas Fairbanks Sr. film Reaching for the Moon, but his first writing work was a screenplay for Fairbanks. His last was scripting the Jack Benny musical Artists and Models.

Some of his early silent film work was for the Christie Film Company, but his later screenwriting was associated primarily with Paramount Pictures where he became a general story advisor. At Paramount he was known for his work with Adolphe Menjou, and had written scripts and special materials for such stars as Raymond Griffith, Gary Cooper and Clara Bow, such as Clarence G. Badger's Paths to Paradise, Victor Fleming's The Virginian, and Frank Tuttle's True to the Navy.

Fighting Caravans (1931), a story of the caravans of wagon trains that supplied freight to the pre-Civil War Old West before the completion of the transcontinental railways, was his adaption of a Zane Grey novel of the same name. His work Man Against Woman for Irving Cummings was called a "forceful drama" and an "entertaining film". During the later part of his career Thompson specialized in comedies. The more notable of these included Leo McCarey's Six of a Kind (1934) which used the top Paramount actors of the time, including Charlie Ruggles, Mary Boland, George Burns, W.C. Fields, Gracie Allen, Alison Skipworth. The 1945 Frank R. Strayer comedy film Mama Loves Papa was based upon his screenplay for the 1933 Norman Z. McLeod film of the same name.

Keene became ill in June 1937, just after completing the script for the Jack Benny musical comedy Artists and Models. On July 11, 1937, he died of lobar pneumonia. His body is interred in the Great Mausoleum, Columbarium of the Graces at Forest Lawn Memorial Park, in Glendale, CA.

=== Filmography ===
==== Silent films ====
- The Inferior Sex (1920)
- Silk Stockings (1920)
- Hoodooed (1920)
- Teasing the Soil (1920)
- Beating Cheaters (1920)
- Kissed in a Harem (1920)
- Good Morning, Nurse (1920)
- Why Cooks Go Cuckoo (1920)
- Oh, Brother! (1921)
- Prepared to Die (1923)
- Let's Go (1923)
- Going South (1923)
- Danger Ahead (1923)
- The Godmothers (1923)
- Easy Pickin's (1924)
- High Gear (1924)
- Border Women (1924)
- Cornfed (1924)
- A Regular Fellow (1925)
- Paths to Paradise (1925)
- The Night Club (1925)
- Why Hesitate? (1925)
- A Rarin' Romeo (1925)
- Love Goofy (1925)
- Great Guns (1925)
- French Pastry (1925)
- Going Crooked (1926)
- The Daffy Dill (1926)
- Now We're in the Air (1927)
- The Rough Riders (1927)
- Wedding Bill$ (1927)
- Someone to Love (1928)
- His Private Life (1928)
- Tillie's Punctured Romance (1928)
- Feel My Pulse (1928)
- The Wolf Song (1929)

==== Sound films ====
- Acquitted (1929)
- The Virginian (1929)
- Acquitted (1929)
- True to the Navy (1930)
- Only the Brave (1930)
- Fighting Caravans (1931)
- Love Among the Millionaires (1930)
- Palmy Days (1931)
- Caught (1931)
- The Sin Ship (1931)
- June Moon (1931)
- No More Orchids (1932)
- Man Against Woman (1932)
- The Last Man (1932)
- War Correspondent (1932)
- As the Devil Commands (1932)
- Mama Loves Papa (1933)
- The Cheyenne Kid (1933)
- Air Hostess (1933)
- Springtime for Henry (1934)
- Many Happy Returns (1934)
- Six of a Kind (1934)
- Paris in Spring (1935)
- Love in Bloom (1935)
- Wives Never Know (1936)
- Artists and Models (1937)
- Mama Loves Papa (1945) (story)
