= Monsieur Albert =

1932 film directed by Karl Anton

- Advertisement featuring Edwige Feuillère
- Directed by: Karl Anton
- Written by: Benjamin Glazer; Ernest Vajda
- Starring: Noël-Noël; Betty Stockfeld; Marcel Barencey
- Cinematography: Rudolph Maté
- Music by: Marcel Lattès
- Production company: Les Studios Paramount
- Distributed by: Les Studios Paramount
- Release date: 2 July 1932
- Running time: 95 minutes
- Country: France
- Language: French

Monsieur Albert is a 1932 French comedy film directed by Karl Anton and starring Noël-Noël, Betty Stockfeld and Marcel Barencey. It was produced by the French subsidiary of Paramount Pictures at the Joinville Studios in Paris.

The film's sets were designed by the art director Henri Ménessier.

== Cast ==
- Noël-Noël as Monsieur Albert
- Betty Stockfeld as Sylvia Robertson
- Marcel Barencey as Octave
- Charles Carson as Mr. Robertson
- Edwige Feuillère as La comptesse Peggy Riccardi
- Vera Baranovskaya as La duchesse
- Louis Baron fils as Le roi
- René Donnio as William
- Jean Mercanton as Le groom
- Georges Bever
- Palau
- Suzette O'Nil
- Hubert Daix
- Westenholz]
- Armand Dranem
- Charlotte Martens
- Martine de Breteuil
- Inka Krymer

== See also ==
- Service for Ladies (1927)
- Service for Ladies (1932)
