= Service for Ladies =

Service for Ladies may refer to:

- Service for Ladies (1932 film), a British comedy film
- Service for Ladies (1927 film), an American silent comedy film
