= A Gentleman of Paris =

A Gentleman of Paris may refer to:

- A Gentleman of Paris (1927 film), a 1927 comedy silent film
- A Gentleman of Paris (1931 film), a 1931 crime drama film
