= Serenade (1927 film) =

1927 film

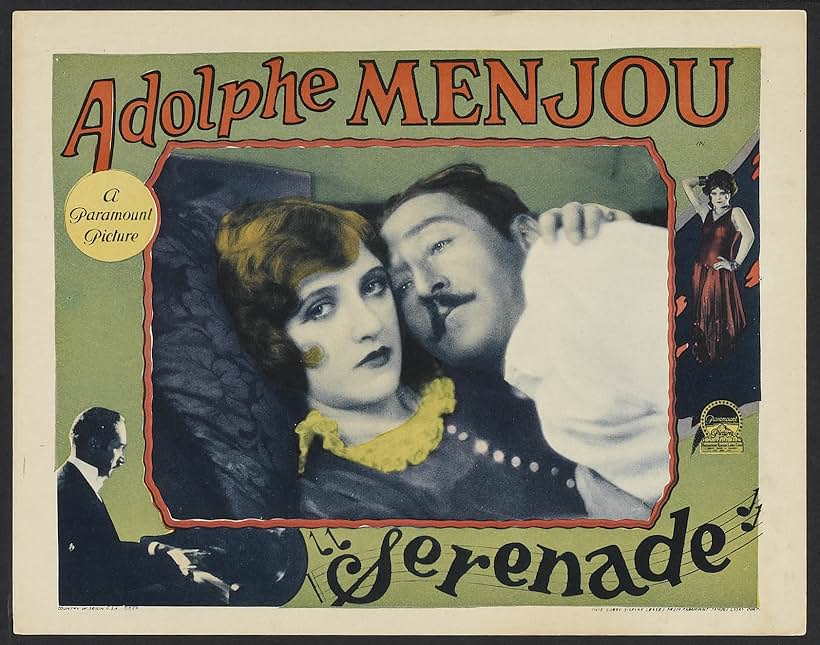
- Directed by: Harry d'Abbadie d'Arrast
- Screenplay by: Herman J. Mankiewicz; Ernest Vajda
- Produced by: Jesse L. Lasky; Adolph Zukor
- Starring: Adolphe Menjou; Kathryn Carver; Lawrence Grant; Lina Basquette; Martha Franklin
- Cinematography: Harry Fischbeck
- Edited by: Ralph Block
- Production company: Famous Players–Lasky Corporation
- Distributed by: Paramount Pictures
- Release date: December 24, 1927
- Running time: 60 minutes
- Country: United States
- Language: Silent..English intertitles

Serenade is a lost 1927 American drama silent film directed by Harry d'Abbadie d'Arrast and written by Herman J. Mankiewicz and Ernest Vajda. The film stars Adolphe Menjou, Kathryn Carver, Lawrence Grant, Lina Basquette and Martha Franklin. The film was released on December 24, 1927, by Paramount Pictures.

== Plot summary ==
Franz Rossi is a brilliant composer who is blessed with a beautiful wife named Gretchen. However, Rossi finds it necessary to involve himself with other women, and so he tries to keep Gretchen at home and away from his work. When Gretchen discovers what her husband has been up to, she disappears completely from view. In time, Rossi discovers that his wife is staying at a fancy hotel, where all indications are that Gretchen herself is now enjoying the favors of another man.

== Cast ==
- Adolphe Menjou as Franz Rossi
- Kathryn Carver as Gretchen
- Lawrence Grant as Josef Bruckner
- Lina Basquette as The Dancer
- Martha Franklin as Gretchen's Mother
