= National Board of Review Award for Best Film =

Annual film award

The National Board of Review Award for Best Film is one of the annual awards given since 1932 by the National Board of Review of Motion Pictures.

== Winners ==
- † = Winner of the Academy Award for Best Picture
- ‡ = Nominated for the Academy Award for Best Picture

=== 1930s ===
Year	Winner	Director(s)
1932	I Am a Fugitive from a Chain Gang ‡	Mervyn LeRoy
1933	Topaze	Harry d'Abbadie d'Arrast
1934	It Happened One Night †	Frank Capra
1935	The Informer ‡	John Ford
1936	Mr. Deeds Goes to Town ‡	Frank Capra
1937	Night Must Fall	Richard Thorpe
1938	The Citadel ‡	King Vidor
1939	Confessions of a Nazi Spy	Anatole Litvak

=== 1940s ===
Year	Winner	Director(s)
1940	The Grapes of Wrath ‡	John Ford
1941	Citizen Kane ‡	Orson Welles
1942	In Which We Serve ‡	Noël Coward and David Lean
1943	The Ox-Bow Incident ‡	William A. Wellman
1944	None But the Lonely Heart	Clifford Odets
1945	The True Glory §	Carol Reed
1946	Henry V ‡	Laurence Olivier
1947	Monsieur Verdoux	Charlie Chaplin
1948	Paisan	Roberto Rossellini
1949	Bicycle Thieves	Vittorio De Sica

=== 1950s ===
Year	Winner	Director(s)
1950	Sunset Boulevard ‡	Billy Wilder
1951	A Place in the Sun ‡	George Stevens
1952	The Quiet Man ‡	John Ford
1953	Julius Caesar ‡	Joseph L. Mankiewicz
1954	On the Waterfront †	Elia Kazan
1955	Marty †	Delbert Mann
1956	Around the World in 80 Days †	Michael Anderson
1957	The Bridge on the River Kwai †	David Lean
1958	The Old Man and the Sea	John Sturges
1959	The Nun's Story ‡	Fred Zinnemann

=== 1960s ===
Year	Winner	Director(s)
1960	Sons and Lovers ‡	Jack Cardiff
1961	Question 7	Stuart Rosenberg
1962	The Longest Day ‡	Ken Annakin, Andrew Marton, Gerd Oswald, and Bernhard Wicki
1963	Tom Jones †	Tony Richardson
1964	Becket ‡	Peter Glenville
1965	The Eleanor Roosevelt Story	Rick Kaplan
1966	A Man for All Seasons †	Fred Zinnemann
1967	Far from the Madding Crowd	John Schlesinger
1968	The Shoes of the Fisherman	Michael Anderson
1969	They Shoot Horses, Don't They?	Sydney Pollack

=== 1970s ===
Year	Winner	Director(s)
1970	Patton †	Franklin J. Schaffner
1971	Macbeth	Roman Polanski
1972	Cabaret ‡	Bob Fosse
1973	The Sting †	George Roy Hill
1974	The Conversation ‡	Francis Ford Coppola
1975	Barry Lyndon ‡	Stanley Kubrick
1975	Nashville ‡	Robert Altman
1976	All the President's Men ‡	Alan J. Pakula
1977	The Turning Point ‡	Herbert Ross
1978	Days of Heaven	Terrence Malick
1979	Manhattan	Woody Allen

=== 1980s ===
Year	Winner	Director(s)
1980	Ordinary People †	Robert Redford
1981	Chariots of Fire †	Hugh Hudson
1981	Reds ‡	Warren Beatty
1982	Gandhi †	Richard Attenborough
1983	Betrayal	David Jones
1983	Terms of Endearment †	James L. Brooks
1984	A Passage to India ‡	David Lean
1985	The Color Purple ‡	Steven Spielberg
1986	A Room with a View ‡	James Ivory
1987	Empire of the Sun	Steven Spielberg
1988	Mississippi Burning ‡	Alan Parker
1989	Driving Miss Daisy †	Bruce Beresford

=== 1990s ===
Year	Winner	Director(s)
1990	Dances with Wolves †	Kevin Costner
1991	The Silence of the Lambs †	Jonathan Demme
1992	Howards End ‡	James Ivory
1993	Schindler's List †	Steven Spielberg
1994	Forrest Gump †	Robert Zemeckis
1994	Pulp Fiction ‡	Quentin Tarantino
1995	Sense and Sensibility ‡	Ang Lee
1996	Shine ‡	Scott Hicks
1997	L.A. Confidential ‡	Curtis Hanson
1998	Gods and Monsters	Bill Condon
1999	American Beauty †	Sam Mendes

=== 2000s ===
Year	Winner	Director(s)
2000	Quills	Philip Kaufman
2001	Moulin Rouge! ‡	Baz Luhrmann
2002	The Hours ‡	Stephen Daldry
2003	Mystic River ‡	Clint Eastwood
2004	Finding Neverland ‡	Marc Forster
2005	Good Night, and Good Luck. ‡	George Clooney
2006	Letters from Iwo Jima ‡	Clint Eastwood
2007	No Country for Old Men †	Joel Coen and Ethan Coen
2008	Slumdog Millionaire †	Danny Boyle
2009	Up in the Air ‡	Jason Reitman

=== 2010s ===
Year	Winner	Director(s)
2010	The Social Network ‡	David Fincher
2011	Hugo ‡	Martin Scorsese
2012	Zero Dark Thirty ‡	Kathryn Bigelow
2013	Her ‡	Spike Jonze
2014	A Most Violent Year	J. C. Chandor
2015	Mad Max: Fury Road ‡	George Miller
2016	Manchester by the Sea ‡	Kenneth Lonergan
2017	The Post ‡	Steven Spielberg
2018	Green Book †	Peter Farrelly
2019	The Irishman ‡	Martin Scorsese

=== 2020s ===
Year	Winner	Director(s)
2020	Da 5 Bloods	Spike Lee
2021	Licorice Pizza ‡	Paul Thomas Anderson
2022	Top Gun: Maverick ‡	Joseph Kosinski
2023	Killers of the Flower Moon ‡	Martin Scorsese
2024	Wicked ‡	Jon M. Chu
2025	One Battle After Another †	Paul Thomas Anderson

== Multiple winners (3 or more) ==
- Steven Spielberg – 4
- John Ford – 3
- David Lean – 3 (one as co-director)
- Martin Scorsese – 3
