= André Cheron (actor) =

French-American actor (1880–1952)

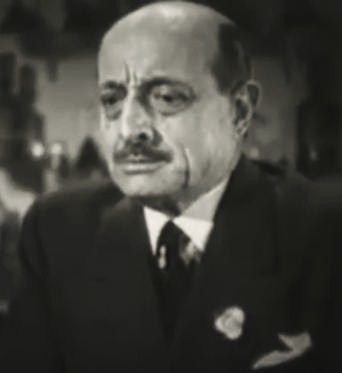
- Cheron in Navy Secrets (1939)
- Born: André Louis Duval; 24 August 1880; Saint-Germain-en-Laye, France
- Died: 26 January 1952 (aged 71); San Francisco, California, U.S.
- Occupation: Actor
- Years active: 1925–1941
- Spouse: Charleen Lippincott (m. 1931)

André Cheron (born André Louis Duval; 24 August 1880 – 26 January 1952) was a French-born American character actor of the late silent and early sound film eras. During his 16-year career he appeared in over 100 films, usually in smaller roles, although with the occasional featured part.

== Life and career ==
Born André Louis Duval on August 24, 1880, in Saint-Germain-en-Laye, France, Cheron immigrated to the United States where he entered the film industry in 1925 under the stage name André Cheron, which came from his mother's maiden name, Marie Chéron. He made his film debut in Arthur Rosson's silent melodrama, The Fighting Demon, starring Richard Talmadge. Other notable films in which he appeared include: Cecil B. DeMille's silent epic The King of Kings in 1927; Emma (1932), starring Marie Dressler; the 1935 classic version of Tolstoy's Anna Karenina, starring Greta Garbo and Fredric March; the screwball comedy, Wife vs. Secretary (1936), with Clark Gable, Jean Harlow, and Myrna Loy; and Edward H. Griffith's 1937 romantic comedy Café Metropole, starring Loretta Young and Tyrone Power. His final acting role was in a small role in the 1941 Bob Hope comedy, Louisiana Purchase.

Cheron married Charleen Lippincott on February 11, 1931, who was 29 years younger than him. He died on January 26, 1952, at the age of 72 in San Francisco, California.

== Filmography ==
(Per AFI database, and imdb.com)

- The Fighting Demon (1925)
- The Girl from Montmartre (1926)
- Kiki (1926)
- The Marriage Clause (1926)
- For Alimony Only (1926)
- Gigolo (1926)
- Rose of the Golden West (1927)
- Evening Clothes (1927)
- The King of Kings (1927)
- The Magic Flame (1927)
- Service for Ladies (1927)
- His Private Life (1928)
- Four Devils (1929)
- They Had To See Paris (1929)
- True Heaven (1929)
- The Kiss (1929)
- The Veiled Woman (1929)
- Slightly Scarlet (1930)
- L'énigmatique Mr. Parkes (1930)
- Oh, For a Man! (1930)
- Oriente y Occidente (1930)
- Sea Legs (1930)
- El impostor (1931)
- Possessed (1931)
- I Like Your Nerve (1931)
- L'aviateur (1931)
- Strangers May Kiss (1931)
- Man of the World (1931)
- Hush Money (1931)
- So Big (1932)
- Night World (1932)
- Une heure près de toi (1932)
- Le bluffeur (1932)
- Men of Chance (1932)
- Careless Lady (1932)
- The Painted Woman (1932)
- Emma (1932)
- Hot Pepper (1933)
- Girl Without a Room (1933)
- Caravane (1934)
- La veuve joyeuse (1934)
- The Black Cat (1934)
- The World Moves On (1934)
- I Sell Anything (1934)
- Fashions of 1934 (1934)
- Monte Carlo Nights (1934)
- Now and Forever (1934)
- The Most Precious Thing in Life (1934)
- One Night of Love (1934)
- Viva Villa (1934)
- Riptide (1934)
- I'll Tell the World (1934)
- Carolina (1934)
- L'homme des Folies Bergère (1935)
- Broadway Melody of 1936 (1935)
- The White Cockatoo (1935)
- Broadway Gondolier (1935)
- Don't Bet on Blondes (1935)
- Here's to Romance (1935)
- The Girl from 10th Avenue (1935)
- Love Me Forever (1935)
- The Man Who Broke the Bank at Monte Carlo (1935)
- Anna Karenina (1935)
- Dressed to Thrill (1935)
- Two Sinners (1935)
- Let's Live Tonight (1935)
- Colleen (1936)
- Wife vs. Secretary (1936)
- Champagne Charlie (1936)
- The Invisible Ray (1936)
- The Princess Comes Across (1936)
- Café Metropole (1937)
- That Certain Woman (1937)
- Kid Galahad (1937)
- God's Country and the Woman (1937)
- Mama Steps Out (1937)
- Espionage (1937)
- Charlie Chan at Monte Carlo (1938)
- Artists and Models Abroad (1938)
- Gold Diggers in Paris (1938)
- I'll Give a Million (1938)
- Navy Secrets (1939)
- Out West with the Peppers (1940)
- Back Street (1941)
- Louisiana Purchase (1941)
