= His Private Life (1928 film) =

1928 film

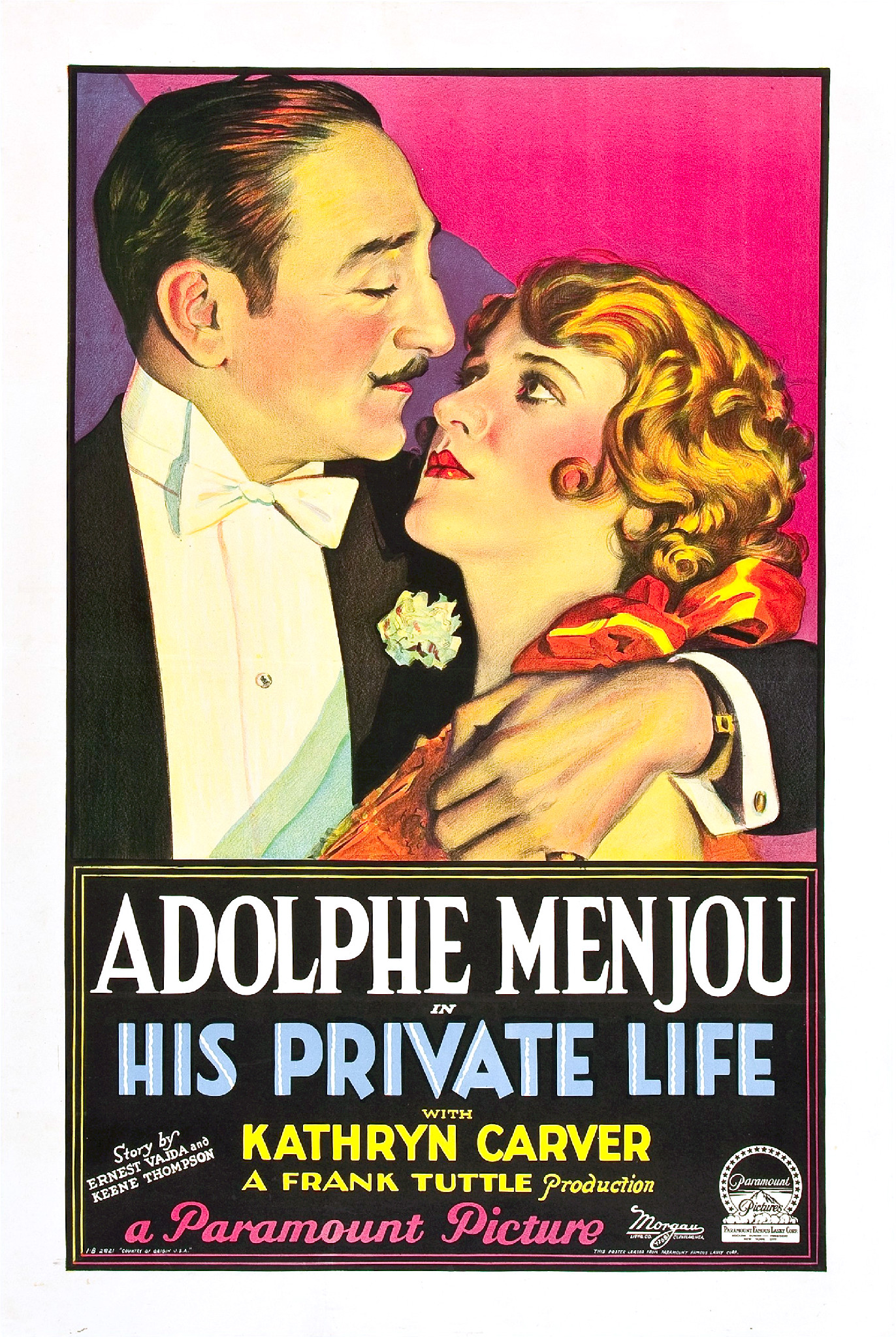
- Theatrical release poster
- Directed by: Frank Tuttle
- Screenplay by: Ethel Doherty; George Marion Jr. Keene Thompson; Ernest Vajda
- Produced by: Jesse L. Lasky; Adolph Zukor
- Starring: Adolphe Menjou; Kathryn Carver; Margaret Livingston; Eugene Pallette; André Cheron; Sybil Grove
- Cinematography: Henry W. Gerrard
- Edited by: Verna Willis
- Production company: Paramount Pictures
- Distributed by: Paramount Pictures
- Release date: November 17, 1928
- Running time: 50 minutes
- Country: United States
- Languages: Sound (Synchronized) (English Intertitles)

His Private Life is a 1928 American synchronized sound comedy film directed by Frank Tuttle and written by Ethel Doherty, George Marion Jr., Keene Thompson, and Ernest Vajda. The film stars Adolphe Menjou, Kathryn Carver, Margaret Livingston, Eugene Pallette, André Cheron, and Sybil Grove.

While the film has no audible dialog, it was released with a synchronized musical score with sound effects using the sound-on-film Western Electric Sound System process. The film was released on November 17, 1928, by Paramount Pictures.

== Plot ==
Georges St. Germain, a suave Parisian, flirts with the reserved yet intrigued Eleanor Trent, but she pointedly rebuffs his advances. Later, Georges discovers that Eleanor is close friends with Yvette Bérgere, his former fiancée, now married to the intensely jealous Henri Bérgere.

Determined to pursue Eleanor, Georges moves into the same hotel where both women reside. When he visits Yvette's apartment and finds Eleanor there, Henri suddenly arrives. To protect herself from suspicion, Yvette introduces Georges as Eleanor's fiancé. Eleanor, caught off guard, plays along but is furious when Georges boldly kisses her in front of the married couple.

Hoping to escape Georges’ attentions, Eleanor retreats to a quiet country inn. Undeterred, Georges follows and orchestrates a romantic evening of music and candlelight to win her over. Eleanor is momentarily touched—until she learns the entire affair was staged. Angry, she returns to Paris.

Later, Eleanor agrees to meet Georges at his apartment to test whether he truly loves her and has broken ties with Yvette. Georges hides Eleanor in a bedroom so she can overhear his rejection of Yvette's affections. The plan backfires when Eleanor peeks out just as Yvette throws herself into Georges’ arms.

Heartbroken, Eleanor prepares to leave, but chaos erupts with the sudden arrival of Henri. Eleanor rushes back to warn Georges and Yvette. In the frenzy, Georges and Eleanor cleverly smuggle Yvette out under Henri's nose. Eleanor's decisive action reveals her true feelings, and Georges finally wins her love.

== Cast ==
- Adolphe Menjou as Georges St. Germain
- Kathryn Carver as Eleanor Trent
- Margaret Livingston as Yvette Bérgere
- Eugene Pallette as Henri Bérgere
- André Cheron as Maurice
- Sybil Grove as Maid
- Paul Guertzman as Stupid boy
- Alex Melesh as Salesman
- Alex Woloshin as Hotel clerk
- Tania Akron as Pierette (uncredited)
- Phillips Holmes as Pierrot (uncredited)
- Lupino Lane in a bit part (uncredited)

== See also ==
- List of early sound feature films (1926–1929)
