= Kathryn Carver =

American actress (1899–1947)

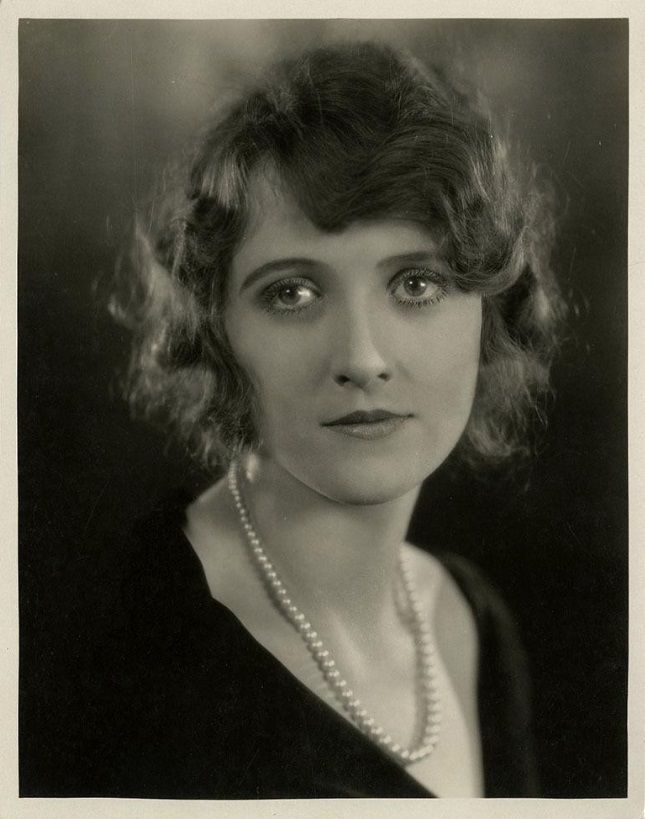
- Carver in 1924
- Born: Catherine Drum; August 24, 1899; New York City, U.S.
- Died: July 17, 1947 (aged 47); New York City, U.S.
- Other names: Kathryn Carver Hall
- Occupation: Actress
- Spouses: Ira L. Hill (m. 1921; div. 1927) Adolphe Menjou (m. 1928; div. 1934) Paul Vincent Hall (m. 1936)

Kathryn Carver Hall (born Catherine Drum; August 24, 1899 – July 17, 1947) was an American actress.

== Career ==
Carver played in motion pictures during a brief career from 1925 to 1929. She co-starred with Adolphe Menjou in Service For Ladies (1927) and His Private Life (1928).

== Personal life and death ==
Carver married photographer Ira L. Hill in Maryland in 1921. They separated in 1924, and they were divorced on May 2, 1927. Carver married Menjou in Paris on May 16, 1928, and they divorced in 1934. On January 9, 1936, she wed broker Paul Vincent Hall in Armonk Village, New York.

She had a nervous breakdown after the death of her sister in 1932. She retired from making motion pictures in 1934. Carver asked for a temporary allowance of $2,300 per month from Menjou's estimated income of $15,000, when she sued him for divorce. Carver's top salary as an actress was in 1928 when she earned $500 per week.

On July 17, 1947, Carver died at Horace Harding Hospital in Elmhurst, Queens. Her residence was at 3505 167th, Flushing, Queens. She was buried in Mount St. Mary's Cemetery in Flushing, New York.

== Partial filmography ==
- The Wanderer (1925)
- When Love Grows Cold (1926)
- The Yankee Señor (1926)
- Service for Ladies (1927)
- Serenade (1927)
- Beware of Widows (1927)
- Outcast (1928)
- His Private Life (1928)
- No Defense (1929)
