= No Defense (1929 film) =

1929 film

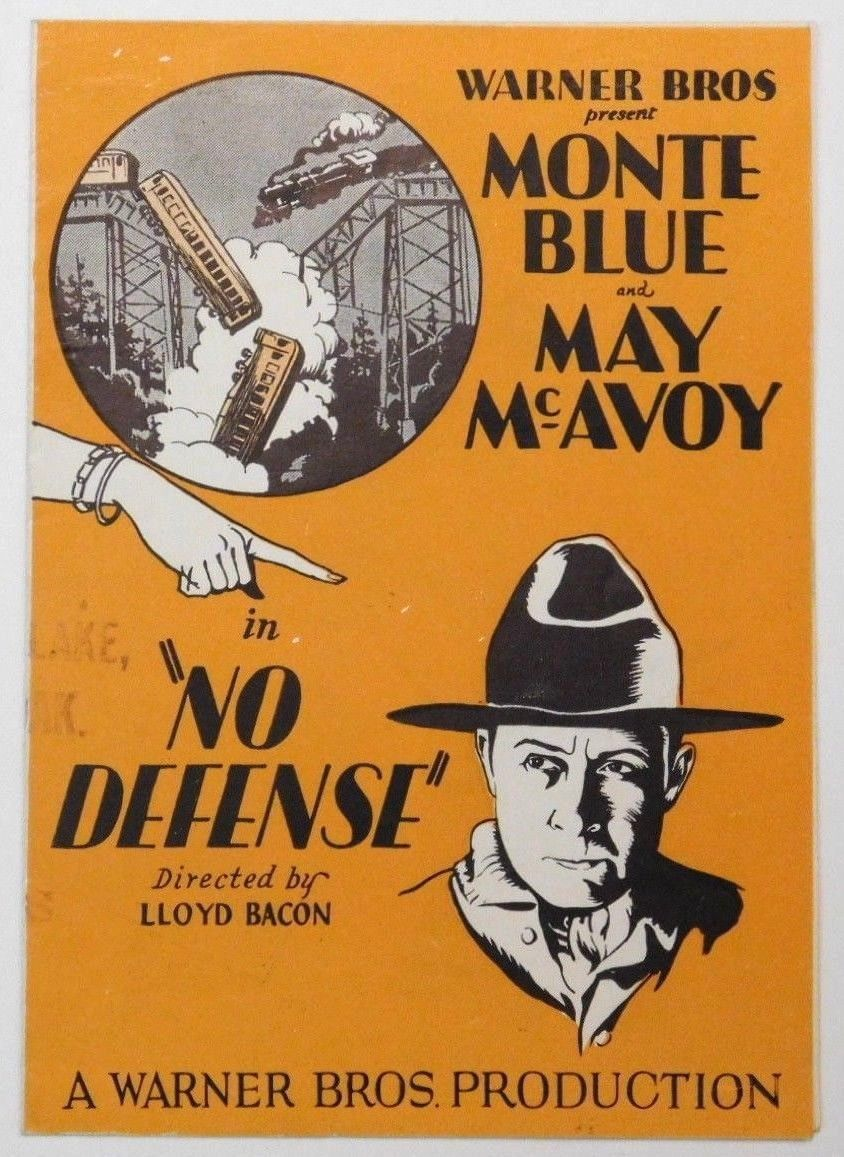
- Theatrical release poster
- Directed by: Lloyd Bacon
- Written by: Robert Lord (scenario)
- Story by: J. Raleigh Davies
- Produced by: Warner Brothers
- Starring: Monte Blue; May McAvoy
- Cinematography: Frank Kesson
- Edited by: Tommy Pratt
- Distributed by: Warner Bros. Pictures
- Release date: April 6, 1929
- Running time: 7 reels; 60 minutes
- Country: United States
- Languages: Sound (Part-Talkie); English Intertitles

No Defense is a 1929 American sound part-talkie romantic drama film directed by Lloyd Bacon and starring Monte Blue. In addition to sequences with audible dialogue or talking sequences, the film features a synchronized musical score and sound effects along with English intertitles. The soundtrack was recorded using the Vitaphone sound-on-disc system. According to the film review in Variety, 60 percent of the total running time featured dialogue. The film was produced and distributed by Warner Bros. Pictures.

== Plot ==
Mark Harper, his daughter Ruth, his son John, and John's wife Lois embark in Mr. Harper's private car for a trip from Boston to Indian River in the far West, where the firm is constructing a new railroad bridge. Monte Collins, the construction foreman, unaware of Ruth's identity, sternly orders her to stop smoking near a cache of explosives. When she persists, Monte warns, "For a nickel I'd spank you!" Ruth indignantly tosses him a nickel, and he carries out the threat.

Monte soon discovers Ruth's identity when he visits the private car and also meets Lois, an idle and selfish woman. Lois, attracted to Monte, attempts to flirt with him, but he rebuffs her and shows interest in Ruth instead. Ruth reciprocates and invites him to visit her in Boston when he comes East on business.

In Boston, Monte attends a party hosted by Ruth, but his ill-fitting evening clothes embarrass her. Disillusioned, Ruth sends him away, and he returns west with John Harper to the construction site.

Lois's constant extravagance and her repeated demands for money lead John to purchase inferior steel for the bridge, saving only $20 per ton but enabling him to give Lois a substantial sum. Monte protests, but John insists the new steel is sufficient.

When the bridge is completed, Ruth and her father travel west for the dedication. Monte and Ruth rekindle their romance, but tragedy strikes when, during the ceremonies, the bridge collapses beneath two trains. Although the crowd had been cleared in time, the trains and bridge debris plunge into the river.

Back in Boston, the Grand Jury convenes to investigate the disaster. Knowing the truth could kill Mr. Harper, Monte falsely confesses to ordering the substandard steel. Harper denounces him, and even Ruth turns against him. Monte is fired in disgrace, and Snitz is appointed the new foreman.

Later that evening, John, overcome with guilt, confronts Lois and admits he authorized the faulty steel to meet her financial demands. Ruth overhears and rushes to Monte, who is preparing to leave the country. Though her father can never learn the truth, Ruth declares her love and insists they start a new life together.

== Cast ==
- Monte Blue as Monte Collins
- May McAvoy as Ruth Harper
- Lee Moran as Snitz
- Kathryn Carver as Lois Harper
- William H. Tooker as Mr. Harper Sr.
- William Desmond as John Harper
- Bud Marshall as The Construction Worker

== Preservation status ==
No Defense is a lost film as prints of it are not known to be extant. It is possible that Vitaphone soundtrack discs of the audio still exist.

== See also ==
- List of early sound feature films (1926–1929)
