= Lawrence Grant =

English actor (1870–1952)

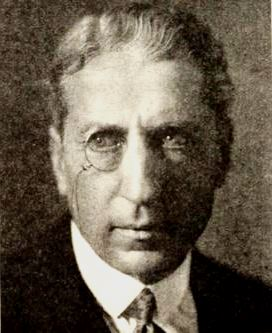
- Grant in 1918
- Born: Percy Reginald Lawrence-Grant; 30 October 1870; Bournemouth, Hampshire, England
- Died: 19 February 1952 (aged 81)
- Occupation: Actor

Percy Reginald Lawrence-Grant (30 October 1870 – 19 February 1952) was an English actor known for supporting roles in films such as The Living Ghost, I'll Tell the World, Shanghai Express, The Mask of Fu Manchu and Son of Frankenstein. He was host of the 4th Academy Awards ceremonies in 1931.

== Selected filmography ==
- The Eternal City (1915) - English Ambassador
- To Hell with the Kaiser! (1918) - The Kaiser / Robert Graubel
- Someone Must Pay (1919) - Walter Hargrave
- Held In Trust (1920) - Dr. Babcock
- The Chorus Girl's Romance (1920) - Jose Brasswine
- Someone in the House (1920) - Walter Hargrave
- Extravagance (1921) - Uncle Mark
- The Great Impersonation (1921) - Emperor William of Germany
- The Dramatic Life of Abraham Lincoln (1924) - Actor at Ford's Theatre
- Happiness (1924) - Mr. Rosselstein
- His Hour (1924) - Stephen Strong
- The Grand Duchess and the Waiter (1926) - The Grand Duke Peter
- The Duchess of Buffalo (1926) - Commandant
- Service for Ladies (1927) - King Boris
- A Gentleman of Paris (1927) - Gen. Baron de Latour
- Serenade (1927) - Josef Bruckner
- Doomsday (1928) - Percival Fream
- Red Hair (1928) - Judge Rufus Lennon
- Something Always Happens (1928) - The Earl of Rochester
- Hold 'Em Yale (1928) - Don Alvarado Montez
- The Woman from Moscow (1928) - The General Stroganoff
- The Case of Lena Smith (1929) - Commissioner
- The Rainbow (1929)
- The Canary Murder Case (1929) - John Cleaver
- Bulldog Drummond (1929) - Dr. Lakington
- The Exalted Flapper (1929) - Premier Vadisco of Dacia
- Is Everybody Happy? (1929) - Victor Molnár
- Safety in Numbers (1930) - Cmmdre. Brinker (uncredited)
- Oh Sailor Behave (1930) - Von Klaus
- The Cat Creeps (1930) - Crosby
- The Boudoir Diplomat (1930) - Ambassador
- Command Performance (1931) - Count Vellenburg
- Forbidden Adventure (1931, also known as Newly Rich) - Equerry
- Their Mad Moment (1931) - Sir Harry Congers
- The Squaw Man (1931) - Gen. Stafford
- Daughter of the Dragon (1931) - Sir Basil Courtney
- The Unholy Garden (1931) - Dr. Shayne
- Shanghai Express (1932) - Reverend Mr. Carmichael
- Man About Town (1932) - Count Vonesse
- Jewel Robbery (1932) - Prof. Bauman (uncredited)
- Speak Easily (1932) - Dr. Bolton
- Divorce in the Family (1932) - Kenny
- Faithless (1932) - Mr. Ledyard
- The Mask of Fu Manchu (1932) - Sir Lionel Barton
- Cavalcade (1933) - Man at Microphone (uncredited)
- The Secret of Madame Blanche (1933) - Commanding Officer (uncredited)
- Clear All Wires! (1933) - MacKenzie
- Looking Forward (1933) - Philip Bendicott
- The Solitaire Man (1933) - Sir Charles Brewster - British Ambassador (uncredited)
- By Candlelight (1933) - Count von Rischenheim
- Queen Christina (1933) - Bit part (uncredited)
- Nana (1934) - Grand Duke Alexis
- Riptide (1934) - Farrington (uncredited)
- I'll Tell the World (1934) - Count Strumsky
- The Count of Monte Cristo (1934) - De Villefort Sr.
- The Painted Veil (1934) - English Governor (scenes deleted)
- The Man Who Reclaimed His Head (1934) - Marchant
- Vanessa: Her Love Story (1935) - Amery Herries
- Naughty Marietta (1935) - Minor Role (uncredited)
- The Devil Is a Woman (1935) - Duel Conductor (uncredited)
- Werewolf of London (1935) - Sir Thomas Forsythe
- The Dark Angel (1935) - Mr. Tanner (uncredited)
- Three Kids and a Queen (1935) - Wilfred Edgar
- A Feather in Her Hat (1935) - Dr. Phillips
- A Tale of Two Cities (1935) - Prosecutor
- Klondike Annie (1936) - Sir Gilbert
- Little Lord Fauntleroy (1936) - Lord Chief Justice
- The House of a Thousand Candles (1936) - Sir Andrew McIntyre
- The Unguarded Hour (1936) - Judge (uncredited)
- The White Angel (1936) - Colonel (uncredited)
- Mary of Scotland (1936) - Judge
- Lost Horizon (1937) - First Man (uncredited)
- Under the Red Robe (1937) - Father Joseph
- Confession (1937) - Doctor (uncredited)
- S.O.S. Coast Guard (1937, Serial) - Rabinisi - Boroff's Spokesman at Screening [Ch. 1]
- The Prisoner of Zenda (1937) - Marshal Strakencz (uncredited)
- Bluebeard's Eighth Wife (1938) - Professor Urganzeff
- Invisible Enemy (1938) - Foreign Diplomat (uncredited)
- The Young in Heart (1938) - Mr. Hutchins
- Marie Antoinette (1938) - Old Nobleman at Birth of Dauphin (uncredited)
- Service de Luxe (1938) - Nicolai Voroshinsky
- Son of Frankenstein (1939) - Burgomaster
- Wife, Husband and Friend (1939) - Rudolph Hertz
- The Sun Never Sets (1939) - Second Selection Board Member (uncredited)
- Pride of the Blue Grass (1939) - Lord Shropshire
- Rulers of the Sea (1939) - Mr. Negley
- Ninotchka (1939) - General Savitsky - Duchess' Consort (uncredited)
- British Intelligence (1940) - Brigadier General (uncredited)
- Women in War (1940) - Sir Gordon, Defense Attorney
- A Dispatch from Reuters (1940) - Member of Parliament (uncredited)
- The Son of Monte Cristo (1940) - The Baron (uncredited)
- Rage in Heaven (1941) - British Consul (uncredited)
- Our Wife (1941) - Dr. Holgarth (uncredited)
- Dr. Jekyll and Mr. Hyde (1941) - Dr. Courtland
- The Ghost of Frankenstein (1942) - Mayor (uncredited)
- My Heart Belongs to Daddy (1942) - Mr. Robertson (uncredited)
- The Living Ghost (1942) - Dr. Bruhling
- G-Men vs. the Black Dragon (1943, Serial) - Sir John Brookfield (uncredited)
- Confidential Agent (1945) - Lord Fetting (final film role)
