= Harry d'Abbadie d'Arrast =

Argentine screenwriter and director (1897–1968)

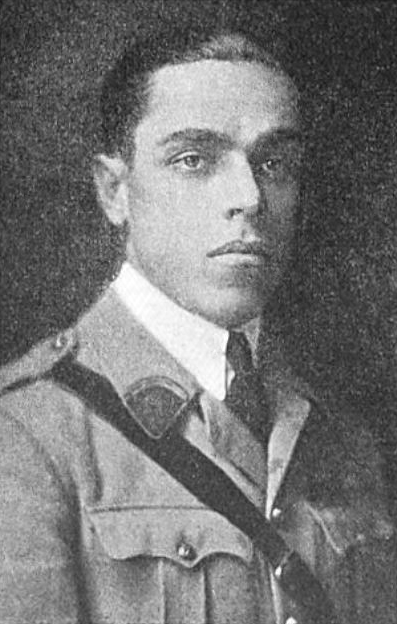
- Born: Henri Charles Armand d'Abbadie d'Arrast; 6 May 1897; Buenos Aires, Argentina
- Died: 17 March 1968 (aged 70); Monte Carlo, Monaco
- Other names: H. d'Abbadie d'Arrast; D'Abbadie D'Arrast
- Occupation: Screenwriter
- Years active: 1923–1935
- Spouse: Eleanor Boardman (m. 1940)

Harry d'Abbadie d'Arrast (6 May 1897 – 17 March 1968) was an Argentine-French screenwriter and director.

== Early life ==
Henri Charles Armand d'Abbadie d'Arrast was born in Buenos Aires, Argentina, on 6 May 1897, to Arnauld Michel d'Abbadie d'Arrast, who built the Buenos Aires tramway network. d'Abbadie d'Arrast is a family of French aristocratic origins.

He attended the Lycée Janson-de-Sailly in Paris.

He was in the French Army during World War I. He was wounded, and while convalescing, he met George Fitzmaurice, already a director, who invited him to Hollywood.

== Career ==
He moved to the United States in 1922 and settled in Hollywood. He worked as an assistant to Charlie Chaplin

He worked as an assistant to Chaplin on A Woman of Paris (1923), starring Edna Purviance and Adolphe Menjou, also, he played a small role.

He worked as an assistant director to Chaplin on The Gold Rush (1925).

He worked as an assistant to William A. Wellman on Wings (1927).

He directed his first film by 1927.

In 1927, he directed three silent films for Paramount Pictures. These were caustic comedies: Serenade, A Gentleman of Paris, and Service for Ladies, in which the star actor of A Woman of Paris, Adolphe Menjou, also played the lead role. The transition to sound films posed no problem for him, as evidenced by the success of his film Laughter, a masterpiece of cynicism and sophistication, released in 1930. At the 1931 Academy Awards, this film was nominated for the Oscar for Best Original Story at the 4th Academy Awards.

Harry d'Abbadie d'Arrast directed seven films between 1927 and 1933, all highly regarded for their sophisticated and biting dialogue, their photography, and their cinematic pace. Unfortunately, due to his irascible character (refusal to speed up production, refusal to systematically accept the actors the producer wanted to impose, etc.), he clashed with moguls like Samuel Goldwyn on the film Raffles, and then with David O. Selznick on Topaze.

The result was that he was blackballed and could no longer find work in Hollywood. He left in 1933 for Spain, where he directed a version of The Three Cornered Hat.

Returning to Hollywood in 1935, he never again found work as a director, but contributed to several screenplays.

== Recognition ==
He was nominated at the 4th Academy Awards for the now defunct category of Best Story for the film Laughter. His nomination was shared with Donald Ogden Stewart and Douglas Z. Doty.

== Personal life ==
He married retired silent-film actress Eleanor Boardman in 1940, ex-wife of King Vidor. They remained married until his death in 1968. In 1946, the couple left the United States for good to live in Saint-Étienne-de-Baïgorry at the Château d'Etchaux, the family estate in Saint-Étienne-de-Baïgorry.

He remained friends with Chaplin, who stayed three times (1925, 1926, and 1931) at the Château d'Etchaux.

His personal fortune initially allowed him to spend very long stays at the Hôtel de Paris in Monte Carlo and to frequent the casino regularly. He did not discover the secret of the martingale. His wife, Eleanor covered his basic living expenses.

He died on March 17, 1968, in Monte Carlo, and was buried in the cemetery of Saint-Étienne-de-Baïgorry.

Eleanor Boardman returned to the United States.

== Filmography ==
=== As a director ===
- The Gold Rush (1925) (assistant director, uncredited)
- A Gentleman of Paris (1927)
- Serenade (1927)
- Service for Ladies (1927)
- Wings (1927) (uncredited)
- Dry Martini (1928)
- The Magnificent Flirt (1928)
- Laughter (1930)
- Raffles (1930) (uncredited-was the director then fired)
- Topaze (1933)
- It Happened in Spain (1934)
- The Three Cornered Hat (1935)

=== As a Writer ===
- The Magnificent Flirt (1928)
- Laughter (1930)
- Die Männer um Lucie (1931)
- Lo mejor es reir (1931)
- Rive gauche (1931)
- It Happened in Spain (1934)
