= The Living Ghost =

1942 film by William Beaudine

- Film poster
- Directed by: William Beaudine
- Written by: Howard Dimsdale (original story); Joseph Hoffman (screenplay)
- Produced by: A.W. Hackel
- Starring: James Dunn; Joan Woodbury
- Cinematography: Mack Stengler
- Edited by: Jack Ogilvie
- Music by: Frank Sanucci
- Production company: Monogram Pictures
- Release date: November 27, 1942
- Running time: 61 minutes
- Country: United States
- Language: English

The Living Ghost is a 1942 American mystery-drama film directed by William Beaudine and produced by Monogram Pictures. Starring James Dunn and Joan Woodbury, the film incorporates elements of the horror genre as it follows an ex-private detective who is called in to investigate why a banker has turned into a zombie. As the detective shares wisecracks with the banker's cheeky secretary, the two fall in love. The film was distributed in the United Kingdom under the title Lend Me Your Ear, and later released on home video as A Walking Nightmare.

== Plot ==
Banker Walter Craig (Gus Glassmire) has disappeared and his best friend, Ed Moline (Paul McVey) hires Nick Trayne (James Dunn), a retired private detective who now earns a living as a quasi-psychic and "listening ear", to take the case. Everyone who lives on the estate is under suspicion—including Craig's second wife Helen (Edna Johnson), his daughter Tina (Jan Wiley) and her fiance Arthur Wallace (Howard Banks), Craig's eccentric sister Delia Phillips (Minerva Urecal) and her husband George (J. Arthur Young), Craig's friend and former partner Tony Weldon (George Eldredge), Craig's cheeky secretary Billie Hilton (Joan Woodbury), and Cedric the butler (Norman Willis). Nick quickly rules out Billie as a suspect and takes her on as his assistant.

Late that night, Delia screams in the parlor when she finds Craig sitting in a chair, though he appears more like a zombie. Nick consults with neurologist Dr. Bruhling (Lawrence Grant), who believes Craig is suffering from a paralyzed cerebral cortex. This state could only have been induced by someone else; Craig could not have brought it on himself. However, Craig's behavior is unpredictable and could be dangerous, so he must be monitored. When Nick goes out to question George in the garden that evening, he finds George has been stabbed to death and Craig is standing by the body. More false clues point to Wallace as the killer. Later, as Nick is talking with Billie in the parlor, Craig wanders in with a knife and tries to stab Nick but fails.

With additional information from Dr. Bruhling about Craig's condition, Nick searches for a laboratory machine that might have been used to alter Craig's brain cells. The trail leads Nick and Billie – who now work together and are falling in love – to a spooky deserted house rented by a Dr. Carson. They search the premises with a flashlight while a storm rages outside. In the cellar, the door is locked on them. Nick professes his love for Billie and she for him. Then they are shot at by an unseen gunman. They return upstairs to find another man who appears to be in the same zombie-like state as Craig. Nick and Billie go to question the realtor of the property, Homer Hawkins, who says he only had contact with Dr. Carson by phone.

Nick wakes up the members of the estate and asks each to record his or her voice so that Hawkins will be able to hear and identify the mysterious Dr. Carson. After everyone returns to bed, two assailants attempt to kill Nick in his bedroom – Tony and Helen. After their arrest, Nick explains their motives: When Craig found out about Tony and Helen's affair, the two knew they could not kill him because Tina would inherit his entire estate. Instead, Tony obtained a machine that would paralyze Craig's brain cells; in that state, Helen could take control of the estate. Tony killed George after George saw him carry Craig back to the house after the brain cell treatment. Though Nick would now be unable to collect the $25,000 reward being offered by Helen, Tina offers to pay it to him instead, and now Nick and Billie can get married.

== Cast ==
- James Dunn as Nick Trayne
- Joan Woodbury as Billie Hilton
- Paul McVey as Ed Moline
- Vera Gordon as Sister Lapidus
- Norman Willis as Cedric
- J. Farrell MacDonald as Police Lt. "Pete" Peterson
- Minerva Urecal as Delia Phillips
- George Eldredge as Tony Weldon
- Jan Wiley as Tina Craig
- Edna Johnson as Helen Craig
- Danny Beck as doubletalker
- Gus Glassmire as Walter Craig
- Lawrence Grant as Dr. Bruhling
- Howard Banks as Arthur Wallace
- J. Arthur Young as George Phillips
- Frances Richards as Dr. Bruhling's nurse

== Production ==
=== Development ===
The Living Ghost was based on an original story by Howard Dimsdale titled "Money for What". Joseph Hoffman adapted the screenplay. The film was director William Beaudine's fourth since beginning projects for Monogram Pictures in 1942.

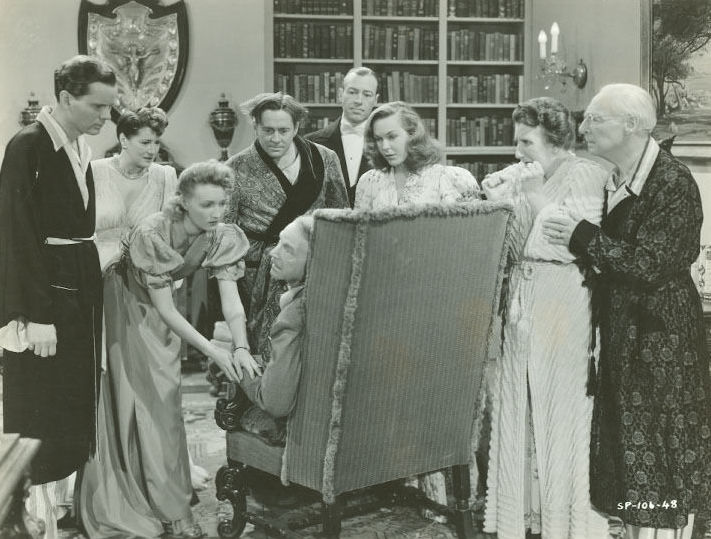
The residents of the estate find Walter Craig in a zombie-like state in the parlor

=== Casting ===
This was James Dunn's first film with Beaudine as director; the two worked together again on Leave It to the Irish (Monogram, 1944) and A Wonderful Life (Protestant Film Commission, 1951). Lawrence Grant, who played Dr. Bruhling, was a long-time British actor working in Hollywood; this was one of his last films.

=== Filming ===
Production began on August 28, 1942. Principal photography took place on "standing sets, interiors and soundstage exteriors" which would be reused in other Monogram horror films and Charlie Chan films starring Sidney Toler.

Like other Monogram productions of the early 1940s, the film was extremely low-budget; DVD Talk estimates the budget was "well under $50,000, probably in the $15,000-$20,000 range".

== Release ==
The Living Ghost was released in the U.S. on November 27, 1942. Several theaters ran the film at late-night or midnight showings to play up the mystery/horror aspect. In Bakersfield, California, the film was screened as a free midnight show in advance of Halloween 1943.

The film was distributed in the United Kingdom by Pathé Pictures under the title Lend Me Your Ear. It was later released on home video as A Walking Nightmare.

== Critical reception ==
The Daily News of New York summed up the film as "a run-of-the-mill who-done-it with a portion of horror added to heighten suspense". The reviewer even claimed to have identified the murderer before the main character does by "picking the most innocent looking concerned". The Boston Globe similarly wrote off the film as "artificial excitement". Previews and reviews in small-market newspapers, however, highlighted the unusual pairing of a murder mystery with a pseudo-scientific experiment. Defining the film's theme as "murder of the mind", the Brooklyn Daily Eagle writes: "this strange story of family intrigue combines all the chills of an ordinary murder mystery with all the eeriness that modern science can produce".

Reviewers cited James Dunn's light-hearted performance as a film plus. The Daily News of New York praised Dunn's comedic talents and his playing the role of a private detective "purely for laughs". The Brooklyn Daily Eagle wrote that Dunn's "facetiousness helps to brighten the darker aspects of the plot". Miller (1973) credits Dunn's "clowning [for] boosting it over the hurdles". Modern critic Leonard Maltin was less complimentary, writing: "Dunn hams outrageously as a detective trying to find a murderer in a houseful of suspects".

Joan Woodbury was also cited by The Brooklyn Daily Eagle for her "charming" character and "excellent performance as a secretary, as an investigator's aide and as a girl in love".

== Sources ==
- Maltin, Leonard (2015). Turner Classic Movies Presents Leonard Maltin's Classic Movie Guide: From the Silent Era Through 1965 (3rd ed.). Penguin. ISBN 9780698197299.
- Marshall, Wendy L. (2005). William Beaudine: From Silents to Television. Scarecrow Press. ISBN 978-0-810-85218-1.
- Miller, Don (1973). 'B' Movies: An Informal Survey of the American Low-budget Film, 1933-1945. Curtis Books.
- Palmer, Scott (1988). British Film Actors' Credits, 1895-1987. McFarland. ISBN 978-0-899-50316-5.
- Parish, James Robert; Pitts, Michael R. (1990). The Great Detective Pictures. Scarecrow Press. ISBN 978-0-810-82286-3.
