= Nicholas Soussanin =

Russian actor (1889–1975)

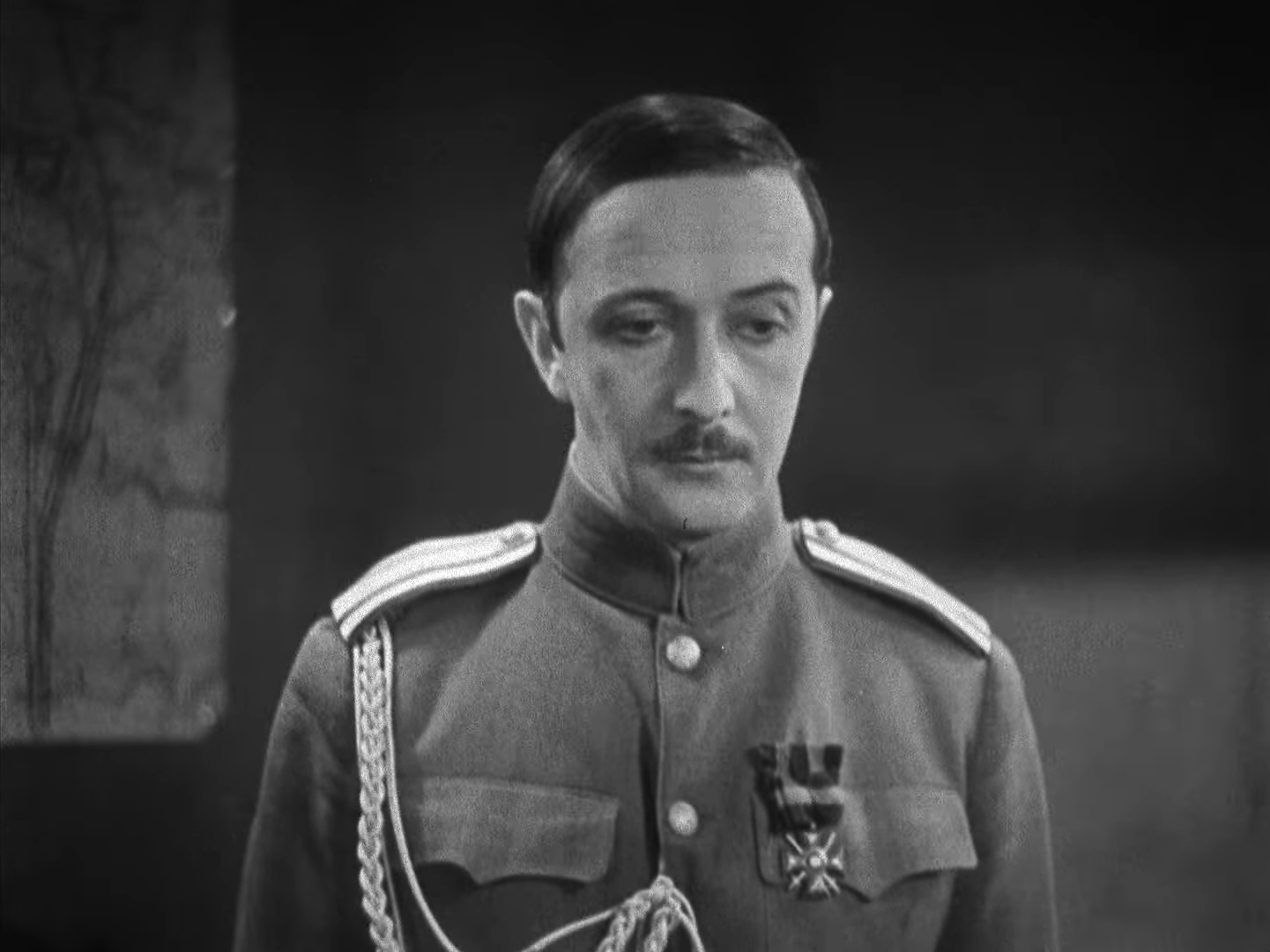
Nicholas Soussanin in The Last Command (1928)

Nikolai Ilyich "Nicholas" Soussanin (Russian: Николай Ильич Сусанин; 16 January 1889, in Yalta – 27 April 1975, in New York City) was a Russian actor who settled and worked in the United States.

== Personal life ==
He was married to actress Olga Baclanova from 1929–1939. He had at least two children (a son born from a previous relationship before his marriage to Olga Baclanova), and a son, Nicholas Soussanin Jr., born with Baclanova in 1930. He was the grandfather of actress Lanna Saunders.

== Filmography ==
Year	Title	Role	Notes
1925	The Swan	Lutzow	
1926	The Midnight Sun	Duke's Aide	
1927	Hotel Imperial	Baron Fredrikson	
1927	One Increasing Purpose	Jule	
1927	The Yankee Clipper	Prince Consort	
1927	Service for Ladies	Waiter with heart ache	
1927	A Gentleman of Paris	Joseph Talineau	
1927	The Spotlight	Daniel Hoffman	
1927	The Last Command	The Adjutant	
1928	Yellow Lily	Dr. Eugene Peredy	
1928	Night Watch	Officer Brambourg	
1928	The Woman Disputed	Count	
1928	Adoration	Vladimir	
1929	Trent's Last Case	Martin	
1929	The Squall	El Moro	
1929	Betrayal		
1930	Are You There?	Barber	
1930	The Criminal Code	Convict	Uncredited
1931	White Shoulders	Head Waiter	Uncredited
1931	Daughter of the Dragon	Morloff	
1932	Arsène Lupin	Martin's Butler	Uncredited
1932	Downstairs	Wedding Guest	Uncredited
1932	A Parisian Romance	Emil	
1935	The Man Who Broke the Bank at Monte Carlo	Cook	Uncredited
1936	Muss 'Em Up	Harding's Butler	Uncredited
1936	Under Two Flags	Levine	
1936	Champagne Charlie	Minor Role	Uncredited
1936	The Road to Glory	Colonel	Uncredited
1938	Artists and Models Abroad	Police Prefect	Uncredited
1939	Captain Fury	Settler	
1939	Those High Grey Walls	'Lindy' Lindstrom	
1941	The Devil and Miss Jones	Man on Rooftop	Uncredited
1941	My Life with Caroline	Pinnock	Uncredited
1949	Black Magic		Uncredited

== Bibliography ==
- Kulik, Karol. Alexander Korda: The Man Who Could Work Miracles. Arlington House (1975 edition), later Virgin Books (1990 edition); ISBN 0870003356/ISBN 978-0870003356
