= The Yankee Señor =

1926 film

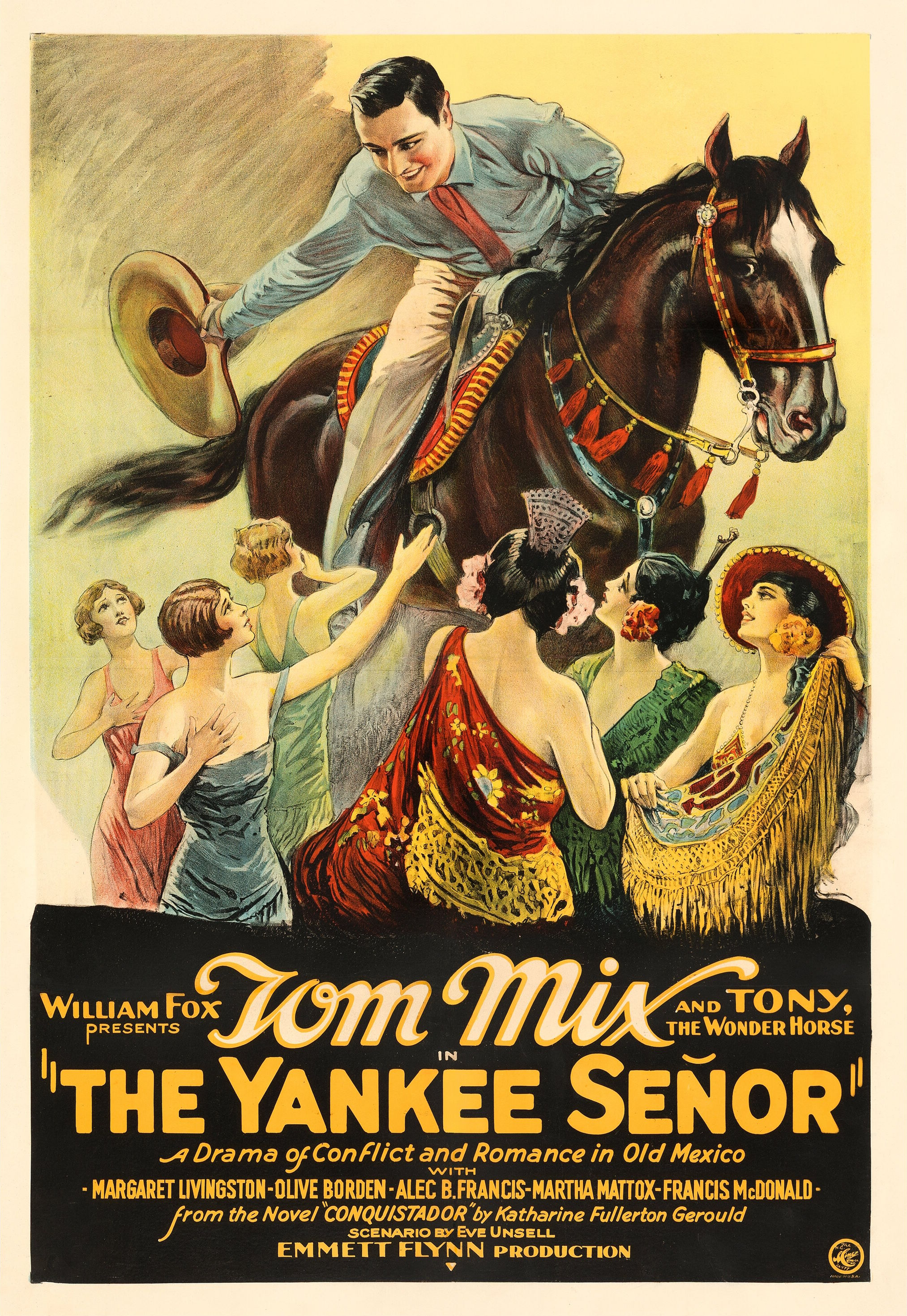
- Theatrical release poster
- Directed by: Emmett J. Flynn
- Written by: Eve Unsell
- Based on: Conquistador by Katherine Fullerton Gerould
- Produced by: William Fox
- Starring: Tom Mix; Olive Borden; Margaret Livingston
- Cinematography: Daniel B. Clark
- Production company: Fox Film
- Distributed by: Fox Film
- Release date: January 10, 1926
- Running time: 54 minutes
- Country: United States
- Language: Silent (English intertitles)

The Yankee Señor is a lost 1926 American silent Western film directed by Emmett J. Flynn and starring Tom Mix, Olive Borden, and Margaret Livingston. An incomplete print of this film exists.

== Plot ==
As described in a film magazine review, civil engineer Paul Wharton receives a letter informing him that he is the heir to Don Fernando in Mexico. Juan Gutiérrez, a cousin, is in reality the leader of a bandit gang, fails in an attempt to fatally injure Paul by tying him on the back of a wild horse when Paul's talented horse Tony comes to his rescue. Juan then attempts to use Flora to compromise Paul with his fiancée and succeeds. Juan then lures Paul to a lonely hut, but Paul cleans up a trio of bandits. Paul then weds Manuelita, daughter of the Don.

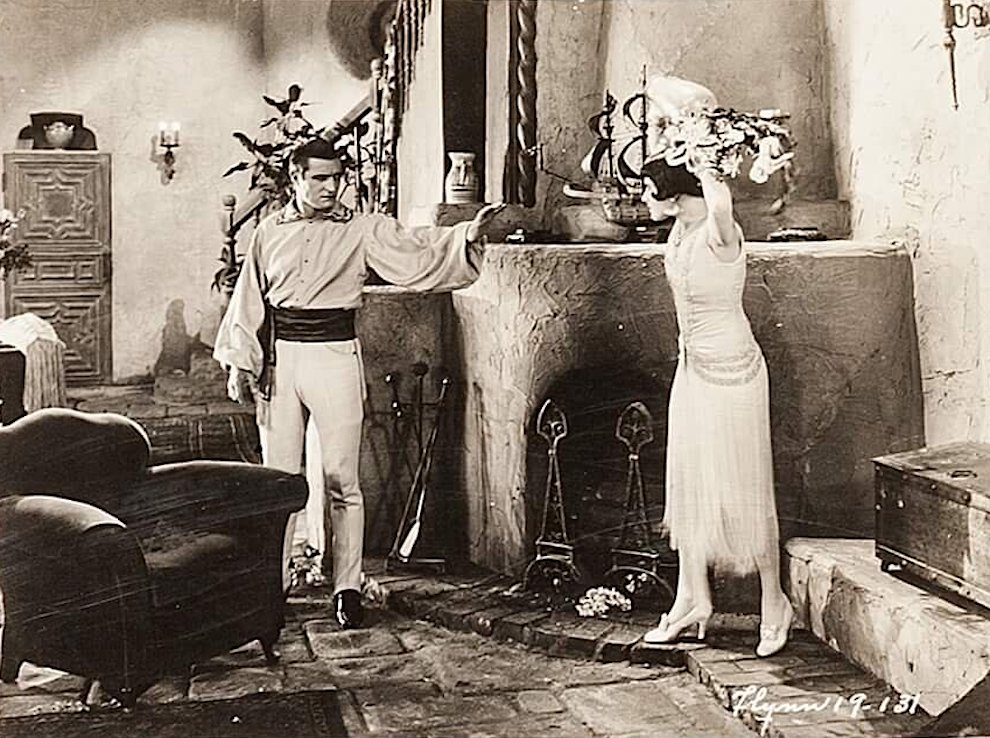
Scene from the film

== Cast ==
- Tom Mix as Paul Wharton
- Olive Borden as Manuelita
- Tom Kennedy as Luke Martin
- Francis McDonald as Juan Gutiérrez
- Margaret Livingston as Flora
- Alec B. Francis as Don Fernando
- Kathryn Carver as Doris Mayne (credited as Kathryn Hill)
- Martha Mattox as Aunt Abigail
- Raymond Wells as Ranch Foreman

== Production ==
Mix selected Olive Borden for her role as the love interest due to her brown eyes. The film had Technicolor sequence involving a Mexican fiesta with Mix and Borden dancing. The high power lighting required for this process resulted in eye pain and headaches that severely affected several cast members including Mix, Livingston, and Carver. Some location scenes involving Mix on horseback were shot in Yellowstone National Park in Wyoming.

== Bibliography ==
- Solomon, Aubrey. The Fox Film Corporation, 1915–1935: A History and Filmography. McFarland, 2011.
