= The Spotlight (film) =

1927 film by Frank Tuttle

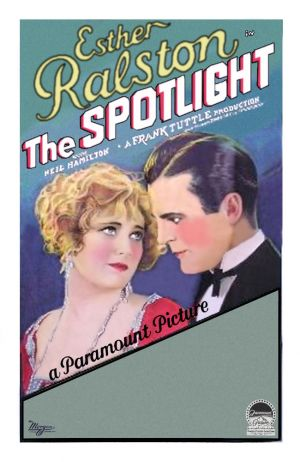
- Theatrical release poster
- Directed by: Frank Tuttle
- Screenplay by: Hope Loring; Herman J. Mankiewicz; Rita Weiman
- Produced by: Jesse L. Lasky; Adolph Zukor
- Starring: Esther Ralston; Neil Hamilton; Nicholas Soussanin; Arlette Marchal; Arthur Housman
- Cinematography: Victor Milner
- Edited by: Louis D. Lighton
- Production company: Famous Players–Lasky Corporation
- Distributed by: Paramount Pictures
- Release date: November 19, 1927
- Running time: 50 minutes
- Country: United States
- Languages: Silent; English titles

The Spotlight is a 1927 American silent comedy film directed by Frank Tuttle, written by Hope Loring, Herman J. Mankiewicz and Rita Weiman, and starring Esther Ralston, Neil Hamilton, Nicholas Soussanin, Arlette Marchal and Arthur Housman. It was released on November 19, 1927, by Paramount Pictures.

== Cast ==
- Esther Ralston as Lizzie Stokes / Olga Rostova
- Neil Hamilton as Norman Brooke
- Nicholas Soussanin as Daniel Hoffman
- Arlette Marchal as Maggie Courtney
- Arthur Housman as Ebbetts

== Production ==
The film is a remake of the 1921 film Footlights.

== Preservation status ==
The Spotlight is a lost film.
