= Topaze (1933 American film) =

1933 film by Harry d'Abbadie d'Arrast

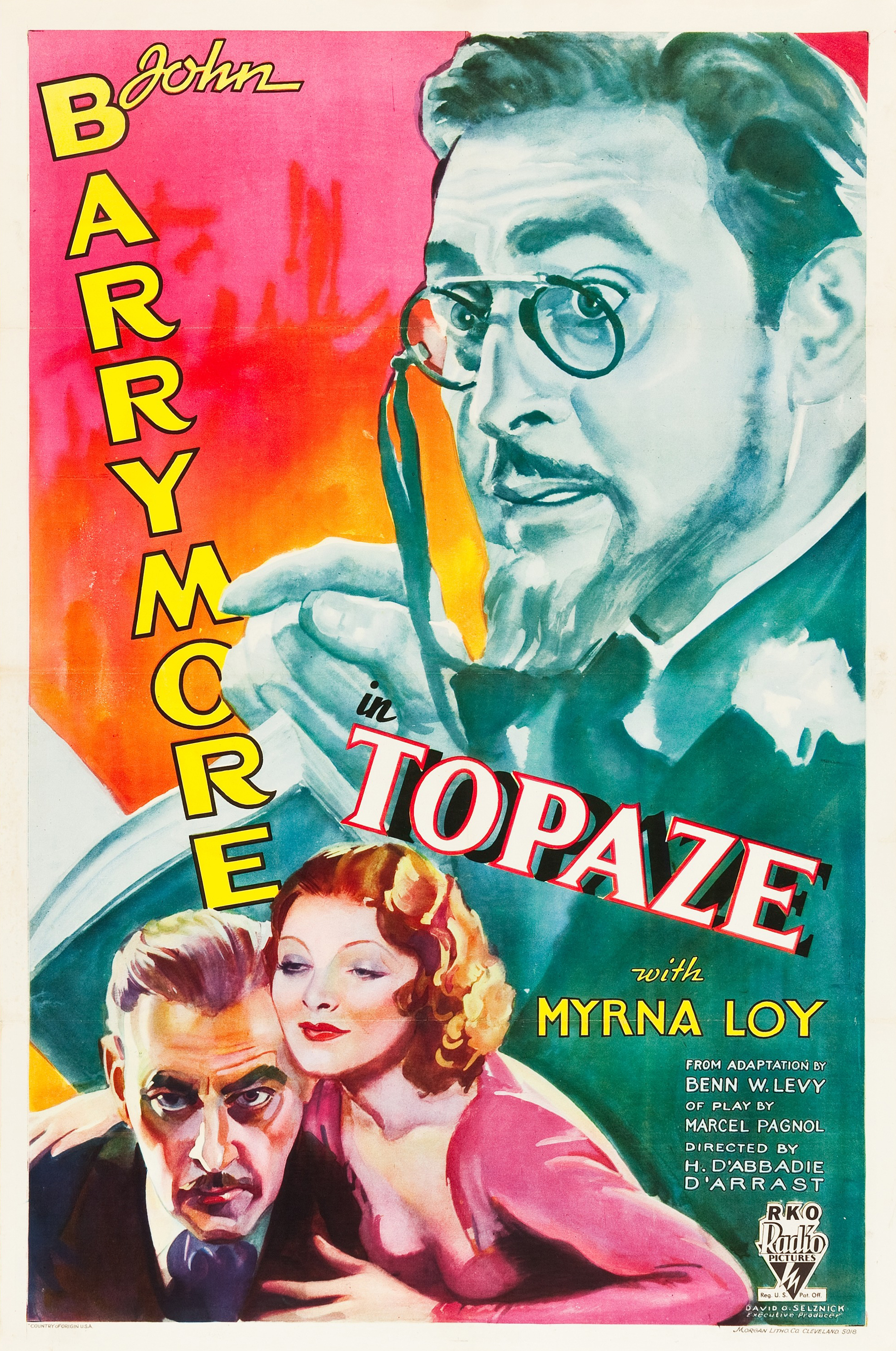
- Theatrical release poster
- Directed by: D'Abbadie D'Arrast
- Written by: Ben Hecht; Benn W. Levy; Charles MacArthur
- Based on: Topaze; 1928 play by Marcel Pagnol
- Produced by: David O. Selznick
- Starring: John Barrymore; Myrna Loy
- Cinematography: Lucien Andriot
- Edited by: William Hamilton
- Music by: Roy Webb
- Distributed by: RKO Radio Pictures
- Release date: February 24, 1933
- Running time: 78 minutes
- Country: United States
- Language: English

Topaze is a 1933 American pre-Code comedy film directed by D'Abbadie D'Arrast and starring John Barrymore and Myrna Loy. It was based on the 1928 French play of the same name by Marcel Pagnol. Another film version of Topaze, this one made in the original French was also released that year, starring Louis Jouvet in the title role. Subsequently, Pagnol himself directed another film titled Topaze in 1936.

== Plot ==
Prof. Auguste A. Topaze (John Barrymore), an honest, naive chemist and schoolteacher at the Stegg Academy in Paris, loses his job when he refuses to accede to a demand by the Baroness de La Tour-La Tour to alter the grades of her bratty son, Charlemagne.

On the same day, Friday the 13th, Topaze calls on the Baron de La Tour-La Tour's mistress, Coco (Myrna Loy), who is looking for a tutor for her sister's son, Alphonse, and had gotten Topaze's name from La Tour. Upon meeting and listening to the sincere remarks of Topaze, the baron, head of the La Tour Chemical Works, decides to employ him as a scientific front for his phony curative water.

After an encounter at a cafe, where the Baron narrowly avoids a scene with his wife by calling Coco "Madame Topaze", Coco reveals the true nature of her relation to the Baron to the naive Professor. When they arrive late back to Coco's apartment, the Baron is jealous, but soon realizes Topaze is entirely innocent.

Unaware that the water, "Sparkling Topaze," which is being sold all over Paris, does not contain the medicinal formula he invented for it, Topaze is shocked when Dr. Bomb (who had turned down the "honor" of having the fraudulent water named for him) shows up, demanding 100,000 francs from the Baron or he will expose the fraudulent product. But the Baron blackmails him in return with information about his previous identity, and Bomb is dragged out.

After confirming for himself, in the lab and in a local restaurant, that "Sparkling Topaze" is in fact phony, a dazed Topaze returns to Coco's apartment the next morning, where Coco fusses over him. At first, he is ready to be arrested, but the men who are shown in are instead a delegation from the Bureau of Awards and Merits, who award him the Academic Palms. All are friends and business associates of the Baron, and the scales begin to fall from Professor Topaze's eyes.

His naivete thoroughly destroyed, declaring "Topaze lies dead in an alley", Topaze decides to fight back by becoming more corrupt than his mentors. He remakes his image and, with Bomb as his assistant, he opens his own office, where he makes dignitaries wait to see him. One is Dr. Stegg, who now wants Topaze to preside at the graduation at the school. Topaze succeeds in blackmailing the Baron into a partnership in his company with a complete account of his relationship with Coco, which he threatens to show to the Baroness, whose name the shares in the company are in.

At the Stegg Academy graduation, Topaze, who has also garnered the romantic attention of Coco, is to award the prize, which he is told is to go to his former nemesis, Charlemagne de La Tour-La Tour. He gives a little speech about his experiences in the great world, that honesty isn't always rewarded and that villainy often receives more applause than virtue. Declaring that he will not reward wrongdoers, he shows up Charlemagne's ignorance relative to all his classmates, then awards the prize to them instead.

He is last seen escorting Coco into the cinema.

== Cast ==
- John Barrymore as Professor Auguste A. Topaze
- Myrna Loy as Coco
- Reginald Mason as Baron Philippe de La Tour-La Tour
- Jobyna Howland as Baroness Hortense de La Tour-La Tour
- Jackie Searl as Charlemagne de La Tour-La Tour
- Albert Conti as Henri de Fairville
- Frank Reicher as Dr. Stegg
- Luis Alberni as Dr. Bomb

== Reception ==
Topaze was the first RKO film to play Radio City Music Hall. It won the 1933 National Board of Review Award for Best Film.

Mordaunt Hall said "[I]t is an agreeable and effective film, and Mr. Barrymore lends no little artistry to the rôle of the benign Professor Auguste Topaze, a part played with rare skill on the stage by Frank Morgan."

In 1935, a planned reissue was rejected by Joseph Breen as the Production Code was now being strictly enforced and the adulterous relationship between Coco and Philippe was unacceptable to the Breen Office.

== Preservation status ==
- The film has been preserved by the Library of Congress, Washington D.C.
