= Beware of Widows =

1927 film

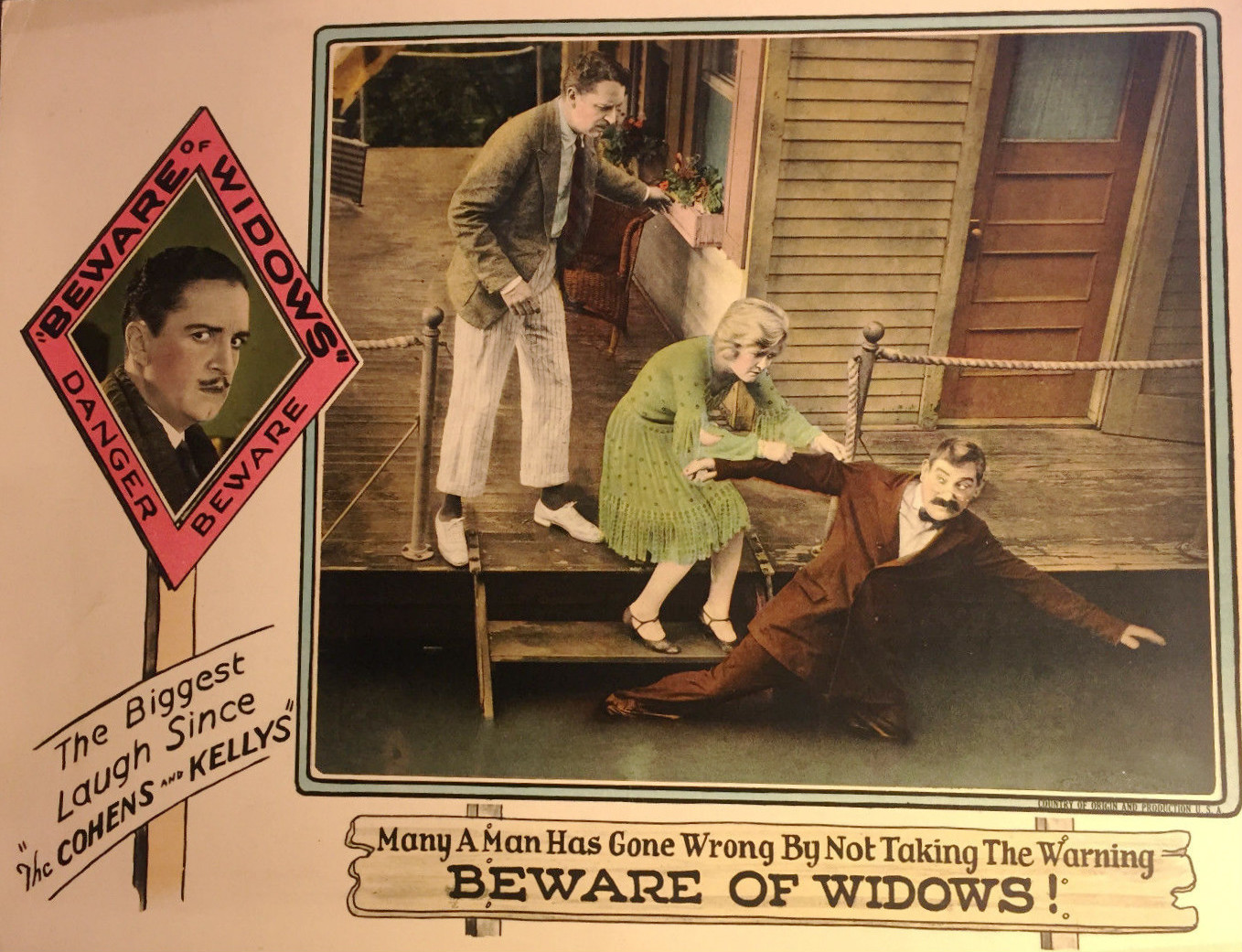
- Lobby card
- Directed by: Wesley Ruggles
- Screenplay by: Beatrice Van
- Based on: Beware of Widows by Owen Moore
- Starring: Laura La Plante; Bryant Washburn; Paulette Duval; Walter Hiers; Tully Marshall; Kathryn Carver
- Cinematography: Gilbert Warrenton
- Production company: Universal Pictures
- Distributed by: Universal Pictures
- Release date: May 23, 1927
- Running time: 60 minutes
- Country: United States
- Language: Silent (English intertitles)

Beware of Widows is a 1927 American silent comedy film directed by Wesley Ruggles and written by Beatrice Van. It is based on the 1925 play Beware of Widows by Owen Moore. The film stars Laura La Plante, Bryant Washburn, Paulette Duval, Walter Hiers, Tully Marshall, and Kathryn Carver. The film was released on May 23, 1927, by Universal Pictures.

== Cast ==
- Laura La Plante as Joyce Bragdon
- Bryant Washburn as Dr. John Waller
- Paulette Duval as Mrs. Paul Warren
- Walter Hiers as William Bradford
- Tully Marshall as Peter Chadwick
- Kathryn Carver as Ruth Chadwick
- Heinie Conklin as Captain
- Otto Hoffman as Mr. Warren

== Preservation ==
With no prints of Beware of Widows located in any film archives, it is a lost film.
