= A Night of Mystery =

1928 film directed by Lothar Mendes

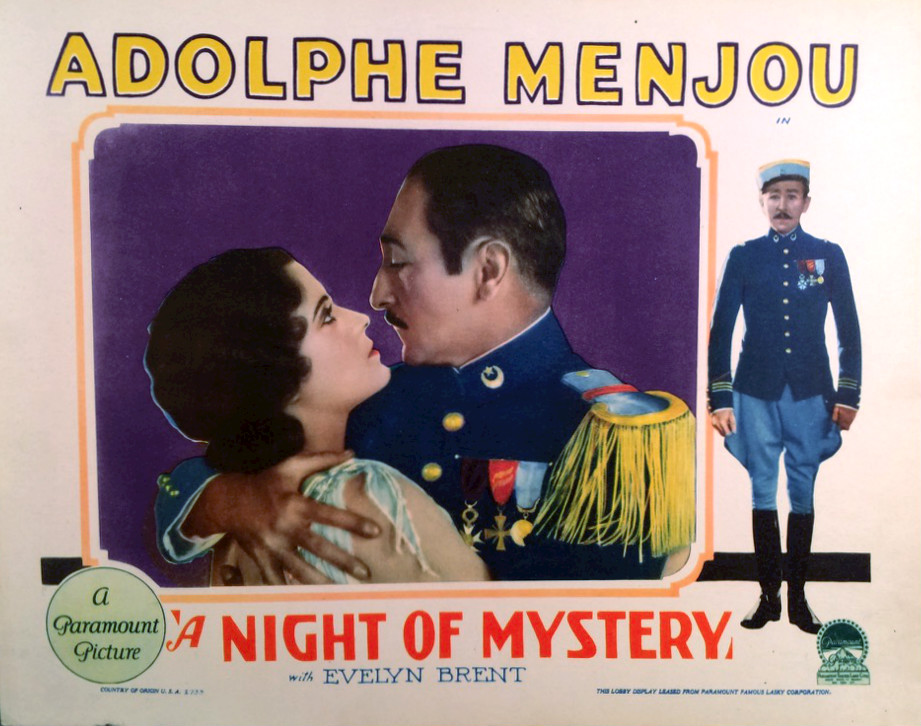
- Lobby card
- Directed by: Lothar Mendes
- Written by: Ernest Vajda; Herman J. Mankiewicz (titles)
- Based on: Ferréol by Victorien Sardou
- Starring: Adolphe Menjou; Evelyn Brent
- Cinematography: Harry Fischbeck
- Edited by: Frances Marsh
- Distributed by: Paramount Pictures
- Release date: April 7, 1928
- Running time: 60 minutes
- Country: United States
- Language: Silent (English intertitles)

A Night of Mystery is a 1928 American silent drama film based upon the play by Victorien Sardou, directed by Lothar Mendes and starring Adolphe Menjou and Evelyn Brent. The film is considered to be lost, with no known archival holdings.

== Cast ==
- Adolphe Menjou as Captain Ferreol
- Evelyn Brent as Gilberte Boismartel
- Nora Lane as Thérèse D'Egremont
- William Collier Jr. as Jérôme D'Egremont
- Raoul Paoli as Marcasse
- Claude King as Marquis Boismartel
- Frank Leigh as Rochemore
