= The Great Flirtation =

1934 film by Ralph Murphy

- Directed by: Ralph Murphy
- Screenplay by: Humphrey Pearson; Gregory Ratoff
- Produced by: Charles R. Rogers
- Starring: Elissa Landi; Adolphe Menjou; David Manners; Lynne Overman
- Cinematography: Milton R. Krasner
- Production company: Paramount Pictures
- Distributed by: Paramount Pictures
- Release date: June 15, 1934
- Running time: 71 minutes
- Country: United States
- Language: English

The Great Flirtation is a 1934 American pre-Code comedy drama film directed by Ralph Murphy and starring Elissa Landi, Adolphe Menjou, David Manners and Lynne Overman. The film was released on June 15, 1934, by Paramount Pictures. It was based on an unpublished story I Love an Actress by Gregory Ratoff and adapted by Humphrey Pearson.

== Plot ==
In Budapest Stephan Karpath is an egotistical but celebrated stage actor, whose lover Zita Marishka is an aspiring actress. When she is cast alongside him in a play he jealously has her fired. In a huff she departs for New York City, but he accompanies her and they are married on the ship going over. However, in American nobody has heard of Stephan and he finds it difficult to find work. His wife hits on the idea of passing herself off as a famous, but unmarried, Russian actress and is cast in the lead of a Broadway play. She manages to get Stephan work playing opposite her, but to his chagrin she is pursued romantically by several men including the producer and the playwright Larry Kenyon. When it dawns on Stephan that she really loves Larry, in whose work she has become a great actress, he pretends to return to Budapest but really goes to North Dakota.

== Cast ==
- Elissa Landi as Zita Marishka
- Adolphe Menjou as Stephan Karpath
- David Manners as Larry Kenyon
- Lynne Overman as Joe Lang
- Raymond Walburn as Henry Morgan
- Adrian Rosley as Mikos
- Paul Porcasi as Herr Direktor
- George Baxter as Arpad
- Judith Vosselli as Queen in Play
- Akim Tamiroff as Paul Wengler
- Vernon Steele as Bigelow

== Bibliography ==
- Dooley, Roger. From Scarface to Scarlett: American Films in the 1930s. Harcourt Brace Jovanovich, 1984.
