= Daughter of the Dragon =

1931 film

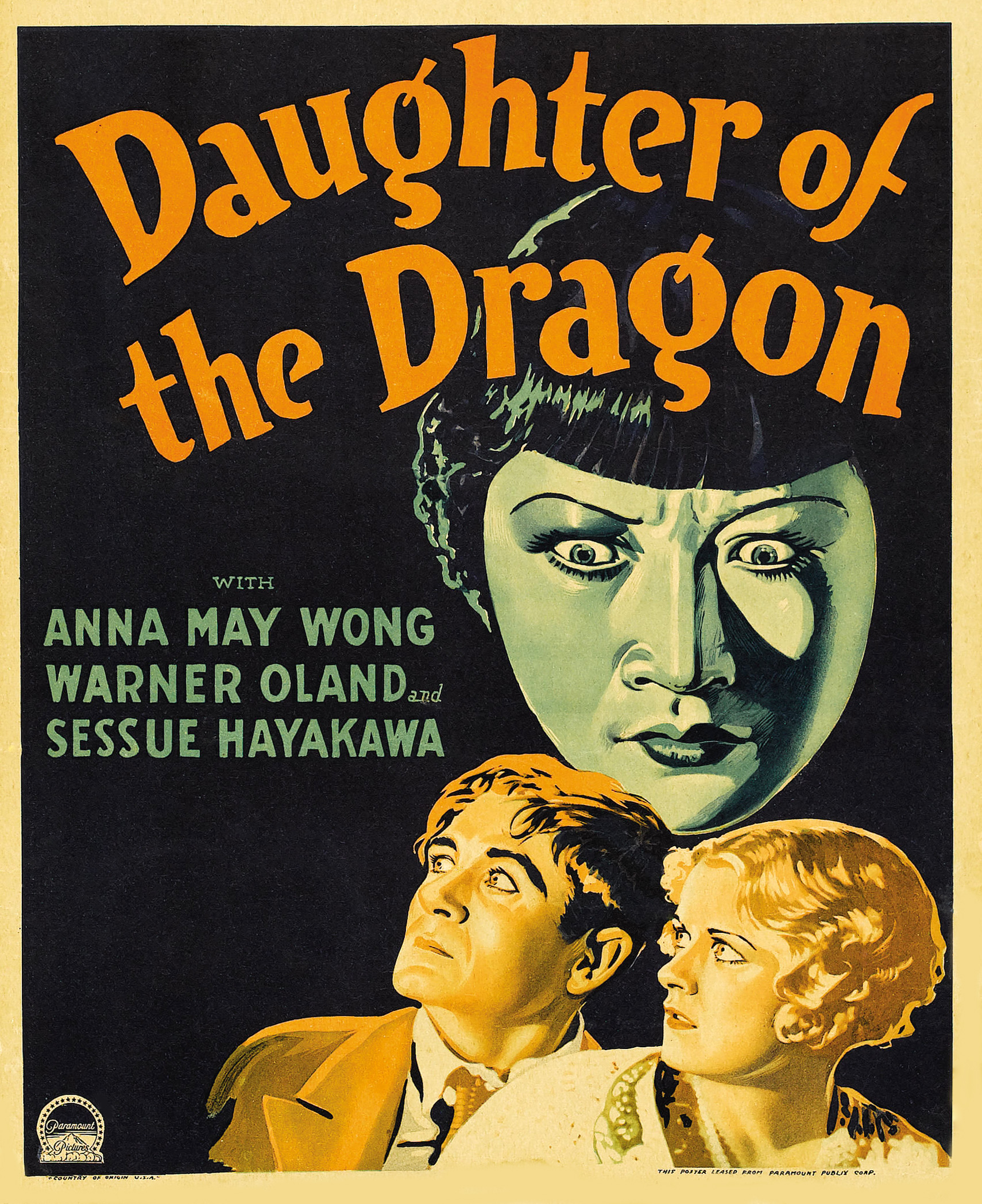
- Theatrical release poster
- Directed by: Lloyd Corrigan
- Written by: Lloyd Corrigan; Monte M. Katterjohn; Sidney Buchman; Jane Storm
- Based on: Daughter of Fu Manchu; 1931 novel by Sax Rohmer
- Produced by: Robert Harris
- Starring: Anna May Wong; Warner Oland; Sessue Hayakawa
- Cinematography: Victor Milner
- Music by: Rudolph G. Kopp; John Leipold
- Production company: Paramount Pictures
- Distributed by: Paramount Pictures
- Release date: September 5, 1931
- Running time: 70 minutes
- Country: United States
- Language: English

Daughter of the Dragon is a 1931 American pre-Code crime mystery film directed by Lloyd Corrigan, released by Paramount Pictures, and starring Anna May Wong as Princess Ling Moy, Sessue Hayakawa as Ah Kee, and Warner Oland as Dr. Fu Manchu (for his third and final feature appearance in the role, excluding a gag cameo in Paramount on Parade). The film was made to capitalize on Sax Rohmer's then current book, Daughter of Fu Manchu, which Paramount did not own the rights to adapt. Despite being the starring lead and having top billing in this film, Wong was paid only $6,000, half the money for her role that Oland was paid for his, even though Oland had less screen time than Wong. In a 2020 article about Wong, O, The Oprah Magazine linked this discrepancy to racism.

== Plot ==
The film is set in London. Fu Manchu is thought to have died twenty years ago, wrongly believing that Sir John Petrie was responsible for the death of his family during the Boxer Rebellion. He swore revenge on Sir John and his family. Princess Ling Moy is a celebrated exotic dancer who goes to the house of her agent Morloff to finally see her father, whom has she never met. Morloff is one of Fu Manchu's henchman, and Fu Manchu is Ling Moy's father. Ah Kee, a Chinese detective working with Scotland Yard tells Sir Basil Courtney that Fu Manchu is still alive and he has just seen him. Sir Basil realizes Fu Manchu will try to murder Sir John, but is unable to warn him by phone because the wires were cut. Sir Basil and Ah Kee go to Sir John's home, which is next door to Morloff's house.

Sir John Petrie receives a threatening letter from Fu Manchu, who then appears in his study. Fu Manchu drugs and hypnotizes Sir John, and then kills him in front of the Petrie family and police. Ah Kee shoots Fu Manchu before he can kill Sir John's son Ronald.

The mortally wounded Fu Manchu escapes and meets Ling Moy, making her take an oath as his son to avenge his and their family's deaths. To remove suspicion from her, Fu Manchu apparently attempts to kill her. They are found and he is shot dead by Ah Kee. The police, Ah Kee and the Petrie family are unaware of the link between Fu Manchu and Ling Moy.

Ling Moy befriends Ronald, intending to kill him, yet they start to develop a romantic interest despite his engagement to Joan Marshall. Ah Kee is also attracted to her, although he is only delegated to guard her.

Ling Moy finds she is unable to kill Ronald as she loves him, and the henchmen are unhappy with her not acting as the son she had declared to Fu Manchu she would be. She attempts to kill herself but is prevented. A henchman burns the incense of repentance, and she is persuaded to overcome her reluctance to kill Ronald. First she must deal with Ah Kee, whom she charms. He confesses his love for her and tries to persuade her to go to China with him.

Joan is kidnapped and, while Ah Kee is occupied, Ronald Petrie and the police are lured to Limehouse to find her. Ronald is captured and brought to Morloff's house where Joan is actually imprisoned. Ah Kee discovers Ronald is in the building and realizes Ling Moy is duping him, and refuses to drink wine he knows is poisoned. Ling Moy reveals that she is the daughter of Fu Manchu. Ah Kee is tied up and locked in the attic.

When Ronald hears Joan's screams, he rejects Ling Moy's advances, and she reveals her true identity to him. She declares Ronald must have a thousand bitter tastes of death before he dies, and prepares to have Joan disfigured with acid before he is killed. Ling Moy even tries to coerce Ronald into stabbing Joan to death. Ah Kee escapes, falls from the attic to the ground and is able to alert the police, who raid the house. Ronald and Joan are saved, and Ling Moy escapes. She is caught but attempts to kill Ronald. She is shot dead by Ah Kee, who declares his love for her before expiring at her side.

== Cast ==
- Anna May Wong as Princess Ling Moy
- Warner Oland as Fu Manchu
- Sessue Hayakawa as Ah Kee
- Bramwell Fletcher as Ronald Petrie
- Frances Dade as Joan Marshall
- Holmes Herbert as Sir John Petrie
- Lawrence Grant as Sir Basil Courtney
- Harold Minjir as Rogers
- Nicholas Soussanin as Morloff
- E. Alyn Warren as Lu Chung
- Wong Chung as Henchman (uncredited)
- Olaf Hytten as Flinders the Butler (uncredited)
- Mary Wong (uncredited)

== Critical reception ==
A review of the film in The New York Times described it as "lavishly staged, with dragons on the walls, secret panels and several persons arrayed in embroidered silken garments", but noted that the actors "sometimes appear to have their minds more on the action of the story rather than on their respective characterizations", and that "Hayakawa [...] does moderately well, even though his lines are not always spoken so that one can understand them." Variety reported that the film had "too much effort concentrated in the wrong directions", that the story was "tangled", that "the dialog is mostly amateurish and inept", but that "youngsters may get a kick out of the incongruous and silly action". A synopsis of the film in Turner Classic Movies noted that it "features the worst of Hollywood stereotypes" with "elements that would make a modern audience cringe," but that it "also featured the beautiful and talented Anna May Wong."

== See also ==
- The House That Shadows Built (1931 promotional film by Paramount with an excerpt from this film)
