= Adolphe Menjou =

American actor (1890–1963)

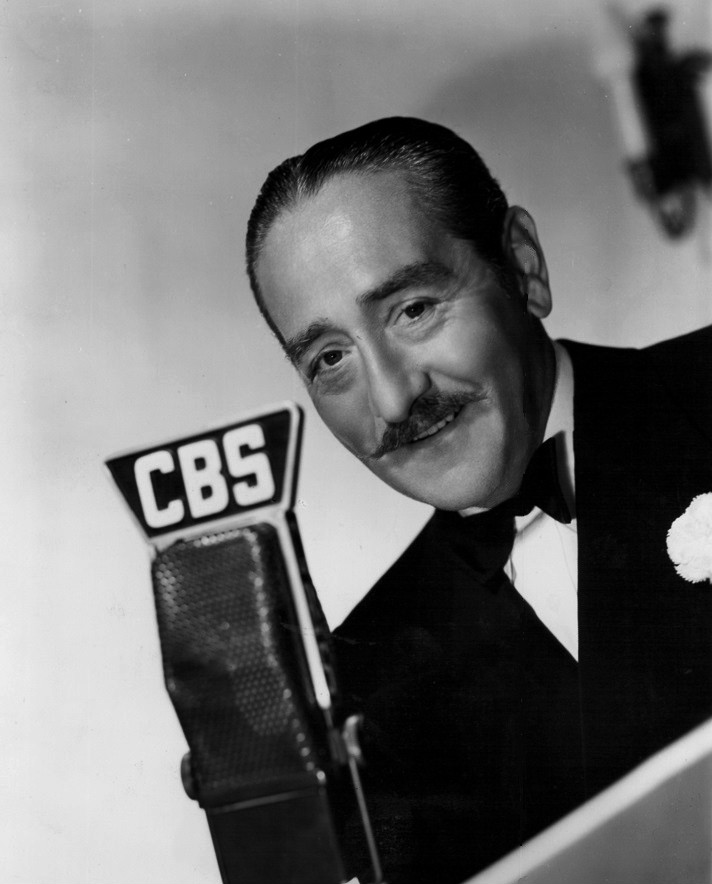
- Menjou in 1938
- Born: Adolphe Jean Menjou; February 18, 1890; Pittsburgh, Pennsylvania, U.S.
- Died: October 29, 1963 (aged 73); Beverly Hills, California, U.S.
- Resting place: Hollywood Forever Cemetery
- Education: Cornell University
- Occupation: Actor
- Years active: 1914–1960
- Political party: Republican
- Spouses: Katherine Conn Tinsley (m. 1920; div. 1927) Kathryn Carver (m. 1928; div. 1934) Verree Teasdale (m. 1934)

Adolphe Jean Menjou [/'ædɒlf 'mɒnʒuː/] (February 18, 1890 – October 29, 1963) was an American actor whose career spanned both silent films and talkies. He became a leading man during the 1920s, known for his debonair and sophisticated screen presence. He was nominated for an Academy Award for Best Actor for his performance in The Front Page (1931).

He played prominent roles in The Sheik (1921), A Woman of Paris (1923), The Marriage Circle (1924), Morocco (1930), A Farewell to Arms (1932), Morning Glory (1933), and the original A Star Is Born (1937). Mainly a supporting actor after the 1940s, he played a prominent role as the antagonist of Stanley Kubrick's Paths of Glory (1957). In 1960, he received a star on the Hollywood Walk of Fame for his contributions to the motion picture industry.

== Early life ==
Menjou was born on February 18, 1890, in Pittsburgh, Pennsylvania, to a French father, Albert Menjou, and an Irish mother, Nora (née Joyce). His brother, Henry Arthur Menjou, was a year younger and also an actor. His family was Roman Catholic.

Menjou attended the Culver Military Academy, and graduated from Cornell University with a degree in engineering. Attracted to the vaudeville stage, he made his movie debut in 1916 in The Blue Envelope Mystery. During World War I, he served as a captain in the United States Army Ambulance Service, for which he trained in Pennsylvania before going overseas.

== Career ==
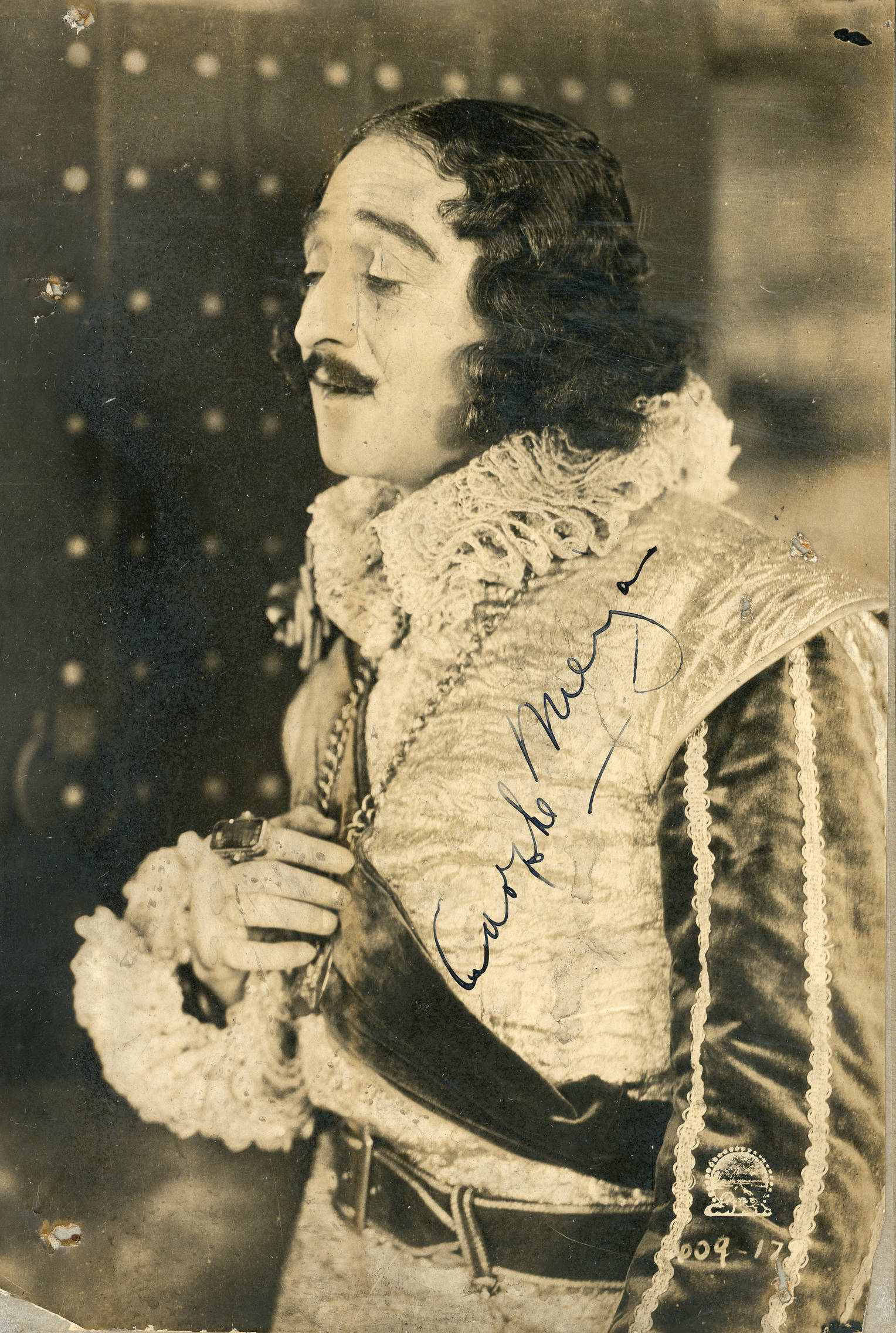
Menjou in The Spanish Dancer (1923)

=== Early films ===
After returning from the war, Menjou gradually rose through the ranks with small but fruitful roles in films such as The Faith Healer (1921) alongside supporting roles in prominent films such as The Sheik (1921) and The Three Musketeers (1921). By 1922, he was receiving top or near-top billing, with a selection of those films being with Famous Players–Lasky and Paramount Pictures, starting with Pink Gods (1922), although he did films for various studios and directors. His supporting role in 1923's A Woman of Paris solidified the image of a well-dressed man-about-town, and he was voted Best Dressed Man in America nine times. He was noted as an example of a suave type of actor, one who could play lover or villain. In 1929, he attended the preview of Maurice Chevalier's first Hollywood film Innocents of Paris, and personally reassured Chevalier that he would enjoy a great future, despite the mediocre screenplay.

=== Stardom ===
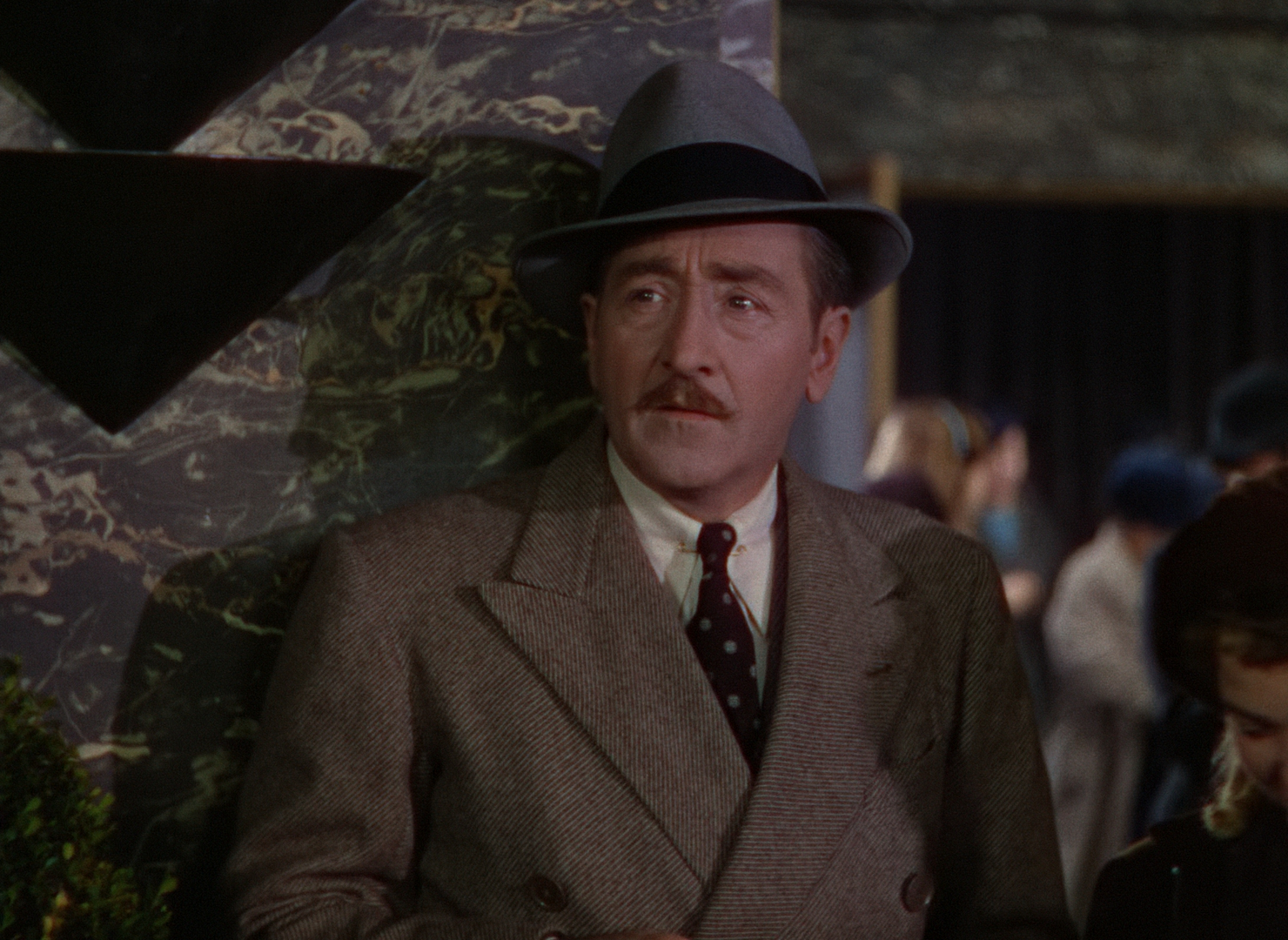
Menjou in A Star Is Born (1937)

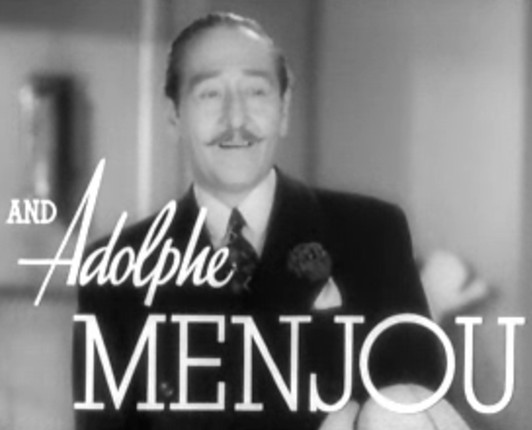
Trailer for Stage Door (1937)

Menjou closed the 1920s with star roles such as His Private Life (1928) and Fashions in Love (1929).

The crash of the stock market in 1929 meant that his contract with Paramount was cancelled, but he went on to Metro-Goldwyn-Mayer (MGM) and continued on with films (then talkies) in a variety of ways, with his knowledge of French and Spanish helping at key times. In 1930, he starred in Morocco, with Marlene Dietrich. He was nominated for an Academy Award for The Front Page (1931), after having received the role upon the death of Louis Wolheim during rehearsals. Up to the mid-1930s, he kept being cast as the romantic lead in a variety of productions, starring opposite Irene Dunne in The Great Lover (1931), with Barbara Stanwyck in Forbidden (1932), and opposite Elissa Landi in The Great Flirtation (1934). A variety of supporting roles in this decade were films such as A Farewell to Arms (1932), Morning Glory (1933), and A Star Is Born (1937).

His roles decreased slightly in the 1940s, but he did overseas work for World War II alongside supporting roles in films like Roxie Hart (1942) and State of the Union (1948). Over the course of his career, he bridged the gap of working with several noted directors that ranged from Charlie Chaplin to Frank Borzage to Frank Capra to Stanley Kubrick.

=== Later career ===
Menjou had just eleven roles in the 1950s, but he managed to snag one last leading role with the film noir The Sniper (1952). In 1955, Menjou played Dr. Elliott Harcourt in "Barrier of Silence", episode 19 of the first season of the television series Science Fiction Theatre. He guest-starred as Fitch, with Orson Bean and Sue Randall as John and Ellen Monroe, in a 1961 episode, "The Secret Life of James Thurber", based on the works of American humorist James Thurber (especially "The Secret Life of Walter Mitty"), in the CBS anthology series The DuPont Show with June Allyson. He also appeared in the Thanksgiving episode of NBC's The Ford Show, Starring Tennessee Ernie Ford, which aired on November 22, 1956. Menjou ended his film career with such roles as French General George Broulard in Stanley Kubrick's film Paths of Glory (1957) and his final film role was that of the town curmudgeon in Disney's Pollyanna (1960).

== Political views ==
Menjou was a conservative, who defended leftist writers against being blacklisted. He supported the Hoover administration's policies during the Great Depression.

In 1947, Menjou gave a testimony at one House Committee on Un-American Activities hearing, with the St. Petersburg Times reporting:

Menjou said he had studied communism and other "isms" extensively. But Menjou was cautious about identifying any individuals definitely as Communists. He said he knew of no members of the Screen Actors Guild who belong to the Communist party, but: "I know a lot of people who act an awful lot like Communists." Most movie producers [however], he said, are patriotic Americans.

Menjou actively opposed discriminating against artists based on their political views: "[Menjou] would not go along with the idea that contracts of known Communist actors or writers should not be renewed. Many Communist writers are splendid writers, he said, they 'just have to be watched, that's all. (...) I'm not afraid of communism in America if it is out in the open,' he explained." He further asserted, "I am not here to smear. I am here to defend the industry in which I have spent the greatest part of my life (...). If we make an anti-Fascist picture, we should make an anti-Communist picture. I'm also anti-Fascist as well as anti-Communist."

Menjou was a member of the Motion Picture Alliance for the Preservation of American Ideals, whose other members included John Wayne, Barbara Stanwyck (with whom Menjou costarred in Forbidden in 1932 and Golden Boy in 1939) and her husband, actor Robert Taylor. It is also well-known that he was, briefly, a member of the right-wing John Birch Society, and that (even after his split with the organization) he still claimed to believe in the society's "principles," until the time of his death.

Because of his political leanings, Menjou came into conflict with actress Katharine Hepburn, with whom he appeared in Morning Glory, Stage Door, and State of the Union (also starring Spencer Tracy). In his book Kate, Hepburn biographer William Mann said that during the filming of State of the Union, she and Menjou spoke to each other only while acting.

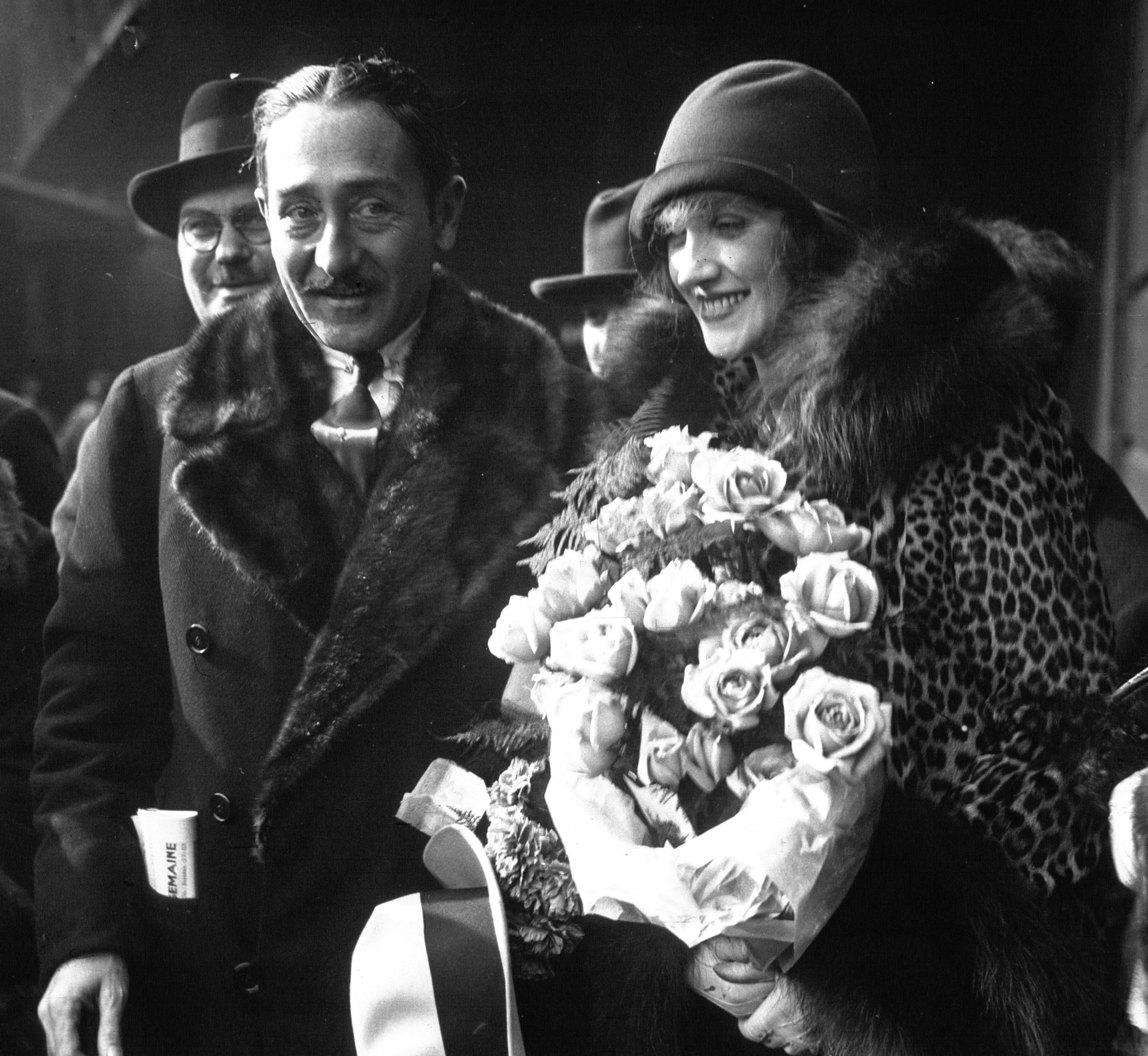
Menjou with his second wife, actress Kathryn Carver, in 1928

== Personal life ==
Menjou was married three times. His first marriage, in 1920 to Kathryn Conn Tinsley, ended in divorce. He married Kathryn Carver in 1928; they divorced in 1934. His third and final marriage, to Verree Teasdale, lasted from 1934 until his death on October 29, 1963; they had one adopted son, Peter Menjou. Menjou had adopted Tinsley's son, Harold Lawton Tinsley, but after his death, his will revealed that he had included only Peter Menjou as his heir.

Menjou was an avid golfer, regularly playing with Clark Gable.

In 1948, Menjou published his autobiography, It Took Nine Tailors.

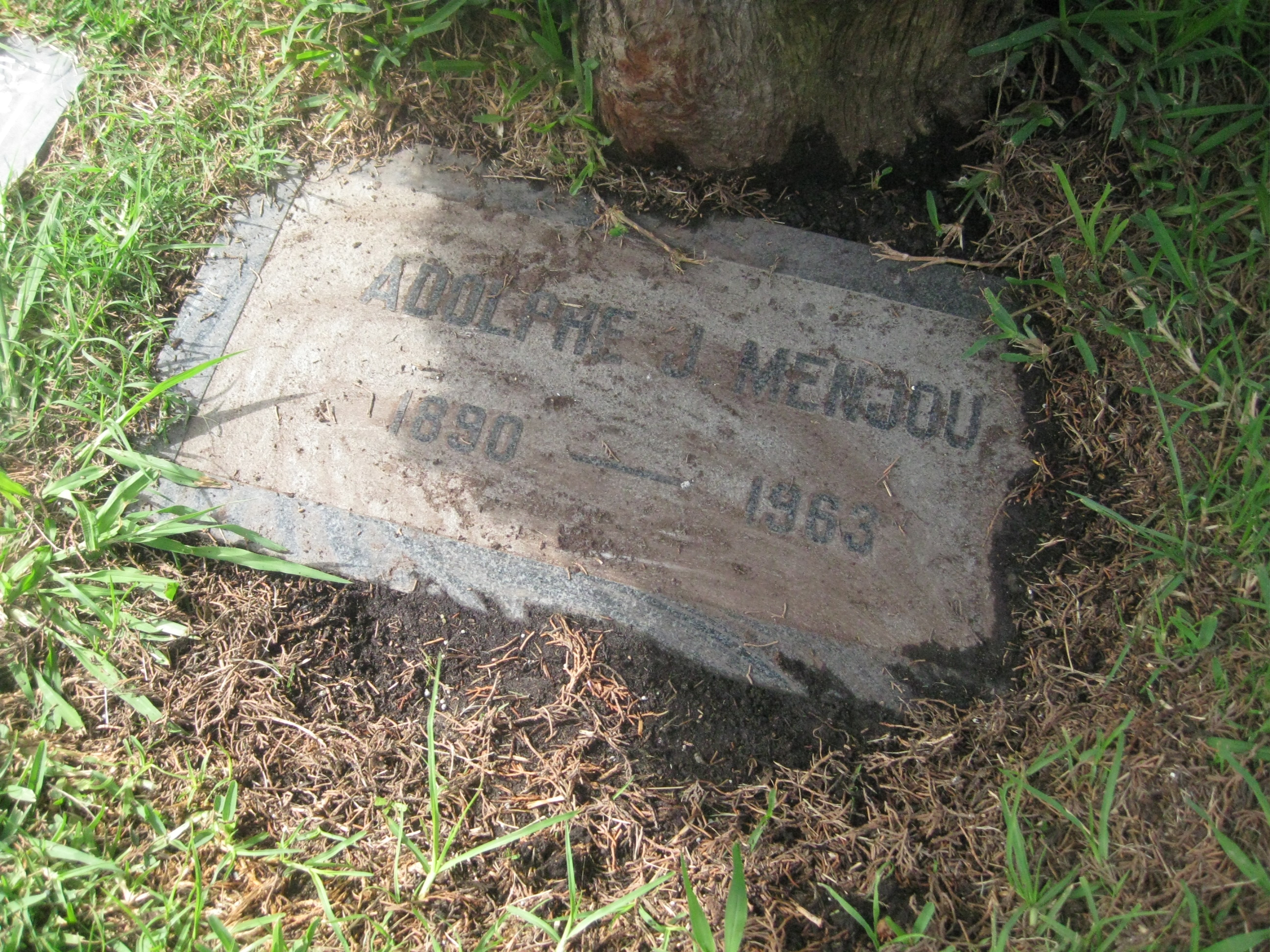
Menjou's grave at Hollywood Forever Cemetery

=== Death ===
Menjou died on October 29, 1963, of hepatitis in Beverly Hills, California. He is interred beside Verree at Hollywood Forever Cemetery.

== Legacy ==
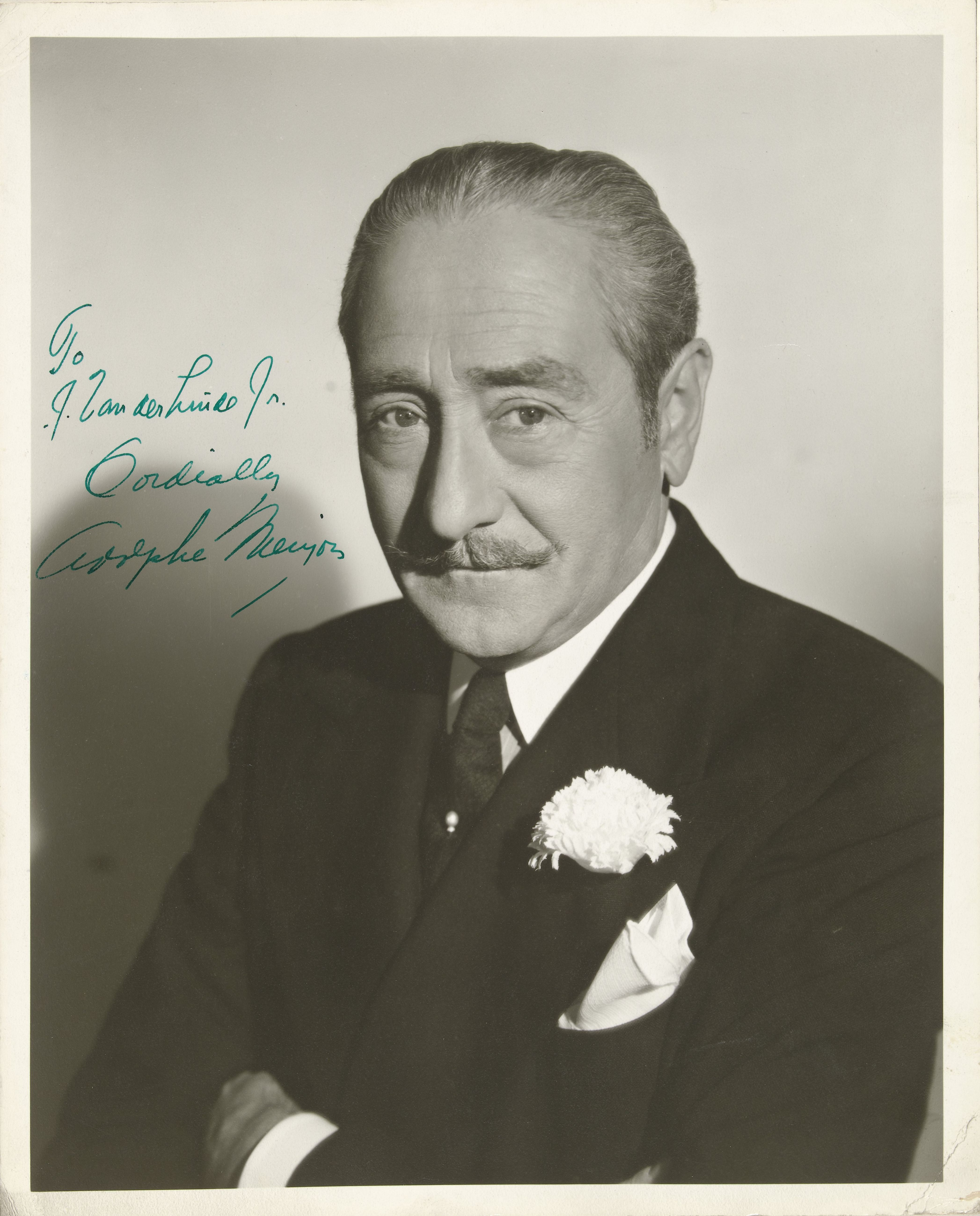
Portrait photograph of Adolphe Menjou

For his contributions to the motion picture industry, Menjou has a star on the Hollywood Walk of Fame at 6826 Hollywood Boulevard.

Salvador Dalí admired Adolphe Menjou: he declared, "la moustache d'Adolphe Menjou est surréaliste" ('the mustache of Adolphe Menjou is surrealist') and began offering fake mustaches from a silver cigarette case to other people with the words "Moustache? Moustache? Moustache?"

One of the most famous photographs by the avant-garde photographer Umbo is titled "Menjou En Gros" ca. 1928.

== Filmography ==
Year	Title	Role	Notes
1914	The Acid Test	Extra	Short film Lost film
1914	The Man Behind the Door	Ringmaster	Lost film
1916	A Parisian Romance	Julianai	Lost film
1916	Nearly a King	Baron	Lost film
1916	The Price of Happiness	Howard Neal	Lost film
1916	The Habit of Happiness	Society Man	
1916	The Crucial Test	Count Nicolai	Lost film
1916	The Devil at His Elbow	Wilfred Carleton	Lost film
1916	The Reward of Patience	Paul Dunstan	Lost film
1916	Manhattan Madness	Minor Role	
1916	The Scarlet Runner		Lost film
1916	The Kiss	Pennington	
1916	The Blue Envelope Mystery		Lost film
1917	The Valentine Girl	Joe Winder	Lost film
1917	Wild and Woolly		
1917	The Amazons		Lost film
1917	An Even Break	Bit Part	
1917	The Moth	Teddy Marbridge / The Husband	Lost film
1920	What Happened to Rosa	Reporter Friend of Dr. Drew	
1921	The Faith Healer	Dr. Littlefield	Lost film
1921	Courage	Bruce Ferguson	Lost film
1921	Through the Back Door	James Brewster	
1921	The Three Musketeers	Louis XIII	
1921	Queenie	Count Michael	Lost film
1921	The Sheik	Dr. Raoul de St. Hubert	
1922	Head Over Heels	Sterling	
1922	Arabian Love	Captain Fortine	Lost film
1922	Is Matrimony a Failure?	Dudley King	Lost film
1922	The Fast Mail	Cal Baldwin	Lost film
1922	The Eternal Flame	Duc de Langeais	Partly lost film
1922	Pink Gods	Louis Barney	Lost film
1922	Clarence	Hubert Stein	Lost film
1922	Singed Wings	Bliss Gordon	Lost film
1923	The World's Applause	Robert Townsend	Lost film
1923	Bella Donna	Mr. Chepstow	
1923	Rupert of Hentzau	Count Rischenheim	Lost film
1923	A Woman of Paris	Pierre Revel	
1923	The Spanish Dancer	Don Salluste	
1924	The Marriage Circle	Prof. Josef Stock	
1924	Shadows of Paris	Georges de Croy	Lost film
1924	The Marriage Cheat	Bob Canfield	Lost film
1924	Broadway After Dark	Ralph Norton	Lost film
1924	For Sale	Joseph Hudley	Lost film
1924	Broken Barriers	Tommy Kemp	Lost film
1924	Sinners in Silk	Arthur Merrill	Lost film
1924	Open All Night	Edmund Durverne	
1924	The Fast Set	Ernest Steel	Lost film
1924	Forbidden Paradise	Chancellor	
1925	A Kiss in the Dark	Walter Grenham	Partly lost film
1925	The Swan	Albert von Kersten-Rodenfels	
1925	Are Parents People?	Mr. Hazlitt	
1925	Lost: A Wife	Tony Hamilton	Lost film
1925	The King on Main Street	King Serge IV of Molvania	
1926	The Grand Duchess and the Waiter	Albert Durant	
1926	Fascinating Youth	Himself	Lost film
1926	A Social Celebrity	Max Haber	Lost film
1926	The Ace of Cads	Chappel Maturin	Lost film
1926	The Sorrows of Satan	Prince Lucio de Rimanez	
1927	Blonde or Brunette	Henri Martel	
1927	Evening Clothes	Lucien d'Artois	Lost film
1927	Service for Ladies	Albert Leroux	Lost film
1927	A Gentleman of Paris	Marquis de Marignan	
1927	Serenade	Franz Rossi	Lost film
1928	A Night of Mystery	Captain Ferreol	Lost film
1928	His Tiger Lady	Henri	Lost film
1928	His Private Life	Georges St. Germain	Lost film
1929	Marquis Preferred	Marquis d'Argenville	
1929	Fashions in Love	Paul de Remy	
1930	Soyons gais	Bob Brown	
1930	My Childish Father	Jérome	
1930	Amor audaz	Albert d'Arlons	
1930	Mysterious Mr. Parkes	Courtenay Parkes	
1930	Morocco	Monsieur La Bessiere	
1930	New Moon	Governor Boris Brusiloff	
1931	The Easiest Way	William Brockton	
1931	Men Call It Love	Tony	
1931	The Front Page	Walter Burns	
1931	The Great Lover	Jean Paurel	
1931	The Parisian	Jérome Rocheville	
1931	Friends and Lovers	Captain Geoffrey Roberts	
1931	Prestige	Capt. Remy Bandoin	
1931	Wir schalten um auf Hollywood	Himself	
1932	Forbidden	Bob	
1932	Wives Beware	Maj. Carey Liston	First film ever shown at a drive-in
1932	Bachelor's Affairs	Andrew Hoyt	
1932	Diamond Cut Diamond	Dan McQueen	
1932	The Night Club Lady	Police Commissioner Thatcher Colt	
1932	A Farewell to Arms	Rinaldi	
1933	The Circus Queen Murder	Thatcher Colt	
1933	Morning Glory	Louis Easton	
1933	The Worst Woman in Paris?	Adolphe Ballou	
1933	Convention City	T.R. (Ted) Kent	Lost film
1934	Easy to Love	John	
1934	Journal of a Crime	Paul Moliet	
1934	The Trumpet Blows	Pancho Montes / Pancho Gomez	
1934	Little Miss Marker	Sorrowful Jones	
1934	The Great Flirtation	Stephan Karpath	
1934	The Human Side	Gregory Sheldon	
1934	The Mighty Barnum	Bailey Walsh	
1935	Gold Diggers of 1935	Nicolai Nicoleff	
1935	Broadway Gondolier	Professor Eduardo de Vinci	
1935	The Milky Way	Gabby Sloan	
1936	Sing, Baby, Sing	Bruce Farraday	
1936	Wives Never Know	J. Hugh Ramsey	
1936	One in a Million	Tad Spencer	
1937	A Star Is Born	Oliver Niles	
1937	Café Metropole	Monsieur Victor	
1937	One Hundred Men and a Girl	John Cardwell	
1937	Stage Door	Anthony Powell	
1938	The Goldwyn Follies	Oliver Merlin	
1938	Letter of Introduction	John Mannering	
1938	Thanks for Everything	J. B. Harcourt	
1939	King of the Turf	Jim Mason	
1939	Golden Boy	Tom Moody	
1939	The Housekeeper's Daughter	Deakon Maxwell	
1939	That's Right—You're Wrong	Stacey Delmore	
1940	Turnabout	Phil Manning	
1940	A Bill of Divorcement	Hilary Fairfield	
1941	Road Show	Colonel Carleton Carroway	
1941	Father Takes a Wife	Senior	
1942	Roxie Hart	Billy Flynn	
1942	Syncopation	George Latimer	
1942	You Were Never Lovelier	Eduardo Acuña	
1943	Hi Diddle Diddle	Col. Hector Phyffe	
1943	Sweet Rosie O'Grady	Tom Moran	
1944	Step Lively	Wagner	
1945	Man Alive	Kismet	
1946	Heartbeat	Ambassador	
1946	The Bachelor's Daughters	Alexander Moody	
1947	I'll Be Yours	J. Conrad Nelson	
1947	Mr. District Attorney	Craig Warren	
1947	The Hucksters	Mr. Kimberly	
1948	State of the Union	Jim Conover	
1949	My Dream Is Yours	Thomas Hutchins	
1949	Dancing in the Dark	Melville Crossman	
1950	To Please a Lady	Gregg	
1951	The Tall Target	Colonel Caleb Jeffers	
1951	Across the Wide Missouri	Pierre	
1952	The Sniper	Police Lt. Frank Kafka	
1953	Man on a Tightrope	Fesker	
1955	Timberjack	'Sweetwater' Tilton	
1956	The Ambassador's Daughter	Senator Jonathan Cartwright	
1956	Bundle of Joy	J.B. Merlin	
1957	The Fuzzy Pink Nightgown	Arthur Martin	
1957	Paths of Glory	Major General Georges Broulard	
1958	I Married a Woman	Frederick W. Sutton	
1960	Pollyanna	Mr. Pendergast	Final film role

== Radio appearances ==
Year	Program	Episode/source
1946	Screen Guild Players	Experiment Perilous
1946	This Is Hollywood	The Bachelor's Daughters

== Television appearances ==
Release Date	Series	Function
January 1953	Your Favorite Story	Host / Occasional Star
March 1958	Target	Host / Occasional Star

== See also ==
- List of actors with Academy Award nominations
