= I'll Tell the World (1934 film) =

1934 film by Edward Sedgwick

- Theatrical release poster
- Directed by: Edward Sedgwick
- Screenplay by: Ralph Spence; Dale Van Every
- Story by: Lincoln Quarberg; Frank Wead
- Produced by: Carl Laemmle, Jr.
- Starring: Lee Tracy; Gloria Stuart; Roger Pryor; Onslow Stevens; Alec B. Francis; Willard Robertson
- Cinematography: Jerome Ash
- Edited by: Daniel Mandell
- Production company: Universal Pictures
- Distributed by: Universal Pictures
- Release date: April 21, 1934
- Running time: 77 minutes
- Country: United States
- Language: English

I'll Tell the World is a 1934 American pre-Code comedy film directed by Edward Sedgwick and written by Ralph Spence and Dale Van Every. The film stars Lee Tracy, Gloria Stuart, Roger Pryor, Onslow Stevens, Alec B. Francis and Willard Robertson. The film was released on April 21, 1934, by Universal Pictures.

== Cast ==
- Lee Tracy as Stanley Brown
- Gloria Stuart as Jane Hamilton
- Roger Pryor as William S. Briggs
- Onslow Stevens as Prince Michael
- Alec B. Francis as Grand Duke Ferdinand
- Willard Robertson as Hardwick
- Lawrence Grant as Count Strumsky
- Leon Ames as Spud Marshall
- Wilhelm von Brincken as Joseph
- Craig Reynolds as Aviator
- Herman Bing as Adolph
- Dorothy Granger as Brown's Girlfriend
- Ward Bond as Dirigible Officer (uncredited)
