= Service for Ladies (1927 film) =

1927 film

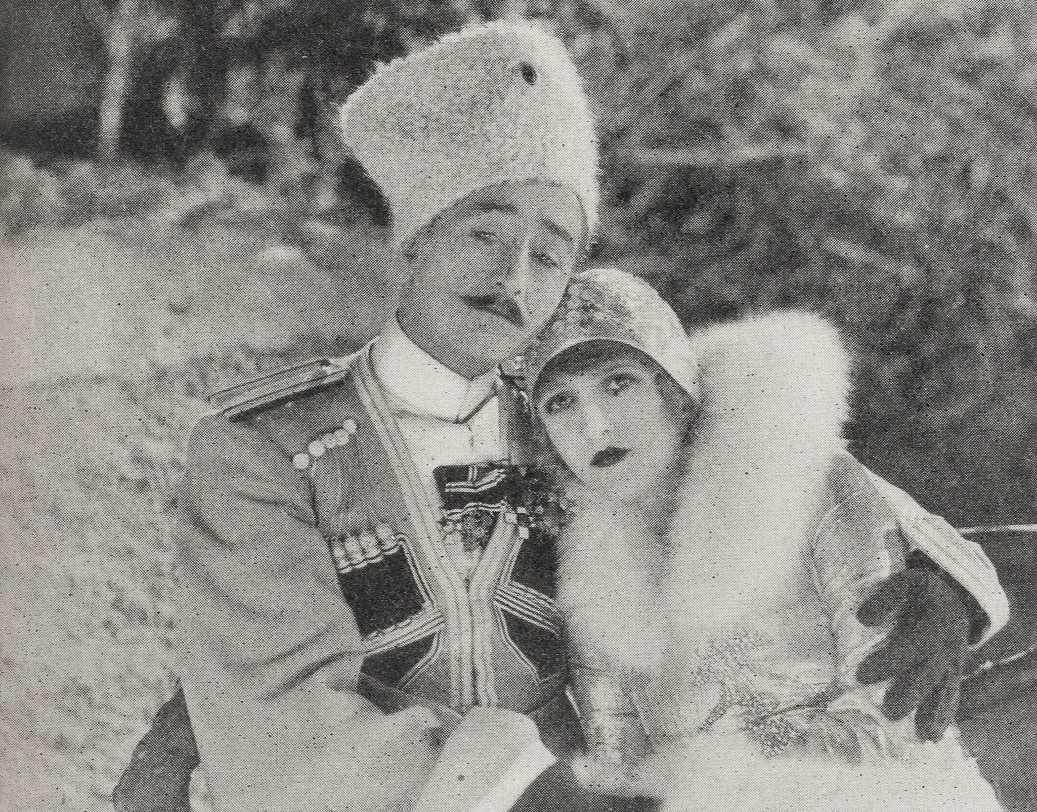
- Still with Menjou and Carver
- Directed by: Harry d'Abbadie d'Arrast
- Screenplay by: Benjamin Glazer; George Marion Jr. Chandler Sprague; Ernest Vajda
- Produced by: Jesse L. Lasky; Adolph Zukor
- Starring: Adolphe Menjou; Kathryn Carver; Charles Lane; Lawrence Grant; André Cheron
- Cinematography: Harold Rosson
- Production company: Famous Players–Lasky Corporation
- Distributed by: Paramount Pictures
- Release date: August 6, 1927
- Running time: 70 minutes
- Country: United States
- Language: Silent (English intertitles)

Service for Ladies is a 1927 American silent comedy film directed by Harry d'Abbadie d'Arrast and written by Benjamin Glazer, George Marion Jr., Chandler Sprague, and Ernest Vajda. Starring Adolphe Menjou, Kathryn Carver, Charles Lane, Lawrence Grant, André Cheron, James A. Marcus and Nicholas Soussanin, it was released on April 6, 1927, by Paramount Pictures.

It was remade in 1932, directed by Alexander Korda and starring Leslie Howard and Elizabeth Allan.

== Cast ==
- Adolphe Menjou as Albert Leroux
- Kathryn Carver as Elizabeth Foster
- Charles Lane as Robert Foster
- Lawrence Grant as King Boris
- André Cheron as Rajah
- James A. Marcus as The head
- Nicholas Soussanin as Waiter with heart ache

== Preservation ==
With no prints of Service for Ladies located in any film archives, it is a lost film.
