= Service for Ladies (1932 film) =

1932 film

- Leslie Howard and Elizabeth Allan
- Directed by: Alexander Korda
- Written by: Lajos Bíró; Eliot Crawshay-Williams
- Story by: Ernest Vajda
- Produced by: Alexander Korda
- Starring: Leslie Howard; George Grossmith Jr. Benita Hume; Elizabeth Allan
- Cinematography: Philip Tannura
- Music by: Percival Mackey
- Production company: Paramount British Pictures
- Distributed by: Paramount British Pictures (UK); Paramount Pictures (US)
- Release dates: 14 January 1932 (UK); 20 June 1932 (US)
- Running time: 65-73 minutes
- Country: United Kingdom
- Language: English

Service for Ladies (U.S. title: Reserved for Ladies) is a 1932 British comedy film directed by Alexander Korda and starring Leslie Howard and Elizabeth Allan. It was written by Lajos Bíró and Eliot Crawshay-Williams based on the novel The Head Waiter by Ernest Vajda, which had previously been adapted a 1927 silent film.

== Plot ==
Max Tracey is the highly respected head waiter at London's Grand Palace Hotel. He falls in love at first sight with Sylvia Robertson, a young woman staying at the hotel, even though he is carrying on an affair with Countess Ricardi. He impulsively joins Sylvia and her father when they leave for the Continent, much to her delight.

Max encounters a monarch traveling incognito as "Mr. Westlake", though all the guests at the hotel where Max and Sylvia are presently staying know who he is. The king knows Max and greets him warmly in the dining room in front of everyone. From this, everyone surmises that Max is a prince, also incognito. Max is pleased when Sylvia states that "social differences" do not matter to her, but before he can reveal his true identity, her father returns.

Complications arise when Countess Ricardi shows up, having seen a newspaper photograph of Max and the king. The countess suspects that Max has fallen for another woman. Sylvia sees them together and her ardour cools, but her father persuades her to fight her rival for Max. Sylvia makes the acquaintance of Countess Ricardi, and Max ends up awkwardly dining with both women, Mr. Robertson and the king at the same table. Max decides to give Sylvia up. She goes to his room to try to make him change his mind, but though he is tempted, he tells her it is impossible. He returns to London. Mr. Robertson is furious and asks the king who Max is and where he can find him; the king tells him to come to dine with him at the Grand Palace Hotel for the answers.

Max is forced to serve the king and the Robertsons in the restaurant. Sylvia makes it painfully clear she does not associate with the lower classes. Then she insists that Max manage a private dinner party for her, even though that is the duty of another waiter. At the party, Sylvia behaves very spitefully towards Max, but Mr. Robinson is a different story. He confides to Max that he started out as a dishwasher, but he knew what he wanted and went after it. Then he encourages Max to do the same. Max reminds Sylvia he promised to kiss her. To avoid him doing so before her guests, she goes into another room. His kiss makes her change her mind, and they elope, leaving the guests waiting.

== Cast ==
- Leslie Howard as Max Tracey
- George Grossmith Jr. as The King
- Benita Hume as Countess Ricardi
- Elizabeth Allan as Sylvia Robertson
- Morton Selten as Mr. Robertson
- Ben Field as Breslmeyer
- Cyril Ritchard as Sir William Carter
- Annie Esmond as Duchess
- Martita Hunt as Aline (uncredited)
- Merle Oberon (uncredited)

== Production ==
Howard and Korda conducted field research in London hotel restaurants before shooting in 1931 in England.

== Critical reception ==
Film Weekly wrote: "Clever dialogue and polished acting – especially on part of Leslie Howard – intelligently applied to piquant situations make Service for Ladies one of the most pleasing entertainment confections yet put out from a British studio."

Mordaunt Hall of the The New York Times, while noting that the film was a remake of the 1927 silent film, commented that it is "An intelligent comedy ... even more amusing than its predecessor." He continued, "It is indeed one of the outstanding British contributions, which reveals what can be done over there with American assistance ... It is genuinely refreshing, intelligent fun, the dialogue being clever and the incidents neatly arranged." Hall also complimented the performances of Howard ("splendid"), Allan ("charming"), Grossman ("capital") and Hume ("makes the most of the part").

Variety described the film as "Another crackerjack [British-made] picture" and commented on Korda's "commendable lightness of touch", aided by dialogue that allows "Howard and the rest of the cast plenty of opportunity for delicate playing."
