= Ernest Vajda =

Hungarian screenwriter (1886–1954)

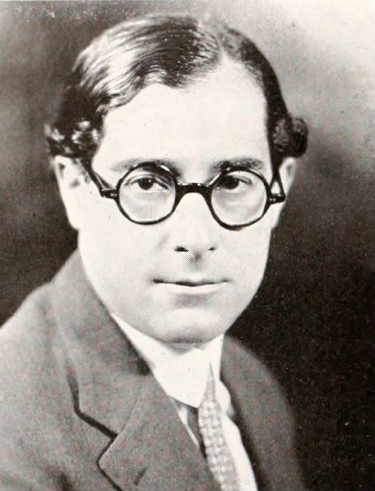
Vajda in 1926

Ernest Vajda (born Vajda Ernő; 27 May 1886 in Pápa, Austria-Hungary, today Hungary – 3 April 1954 in Woodland Hills, California) was a Hungarian actor, playwright, and novelist, but is more famous today for his screenplays.

== Life and career ==
Born in Pápa, his family moved to Komárno after his father died. Vajda returned to Pápa to attend the college there.

He co-wrote the screenplay for the film Smilin' Through (1932), based on the hit play by Jane Cowl and Jane Murfin. Vajda also wrote the screenplay for the first film version of Rudolph Besier's The Barretts of Wimpole Street (1934).

== Partial filmography ==
- The Unknown Tomorrow (1923)
- The Crown of Lies (1926)
- You Never Know Women (1926) original story
- Service for Ladies (1927) original story "The Head Waiter"
- The Woman on Trial (1927)
- Manhattan Cocktail (1928) original story
- A Night of Mystery (1928)
- Manhattan Cowboy (1928)
- The Love Parade (1929)
- Monte Carlo (1930)
- The Smiling Lieutenant (1931)
- The Guardsman (1931)
- Tonight or Never (1931)
- Service for Ladies (1932) original story "The Head Waiter"
- Payment Deferred (1932)
- Monsieur Albert (1932) original story "The Head Waiter"
- Broken Lullaby (1932)
- Reunion in Vienna (1933)
- The Barretts of Wimpole Street (1934)
- The Merry Widow (1934)
- A Woman Rebels (1936)
- The Great Garrick (1937)
- Marie Antoinette (1938)
- Dramatic School (1938)
- He Stayed for Breakfast (1940)
- Smilin' Through (1941)
- Stars and Stripes Forever (1952)
