= Charlie Chaplin: Intimate Close-Ups =

Memoir by Georgia Hale

- Editor: Heather Kiernan
- Author: Georgia Hale
- Language: English
- Genre: Memoir
- Publisher: The Scarecrow Press
- Publication date: 1995
- ISBN: 1-57886-004-0

Charlie Chaplin: Intimate Close-Ups is a memoir by the American actress Georgia Hale which was written in the 1960s. Ten years after Hale's 1985 death, Heather Kiernan edited the manuscript and it was published in 1995 by The Scarecrow Press with a second edition published in 1999.

Georgia Hale was Charles Chaplin's co-star in The Gold Rush in 1925, and was one of the many who romanced the actor-director. Like another Chaplin companion/co-star, Edna Purviance, she never married him, and like Purviance she maintained a relationship of varying degrees with Chaplin for a number of years.

The book primarily chronicles Hale's love/hate relationship with Chaplin, from her initial infatuation with him as a child through her being chosen to co-star with him in Gold Rush, and entering into romance despite him being married to Lita Grey, to her temporary casting in the 1931 film City Lights as a replacement for the fired Virginia Cherrill, through to both hers and Chaplin's senior years. An introduction by Kiernan provides an outline of Hale's life and career. According to Kiernan's introduction, Hale wrote two versions of her autobiography, but Kiernan chose to release the second version which she says was more detailed; Hale herself vetoed publication of the first version as being too one-sided with regard to Chaplin. Kiernan writes that Hale tried to publish the book in the 1960s, but could not find a publisher. The editor notes that in her memoir, Hale refers to Chaplin as two people: Charlie, the man she fell in love with, and "Mr. Chaplin", the sometimes-cruel film giant and director. The book also includes a listing of Hale's film appearances and a small collection of photographs, including behind-the-scenes images from production of The Gold Rush and images of Hale from other film appearances including her screen test for City Lights.

== Bibliography ==
- Georgia Hale, Charlie Chaplin: Intimate Close-Ups, edited by Heather Kiernan. Lanham: Scarecrow Press, 1995 and 1999. ISBN 1-57886-004-0 (1999 edition).
