= Fanny Hatton =

American screenwriter

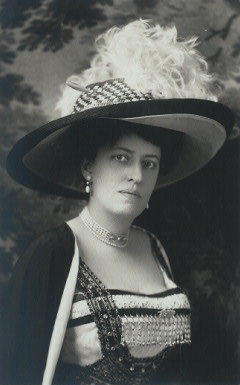
- Born: Frances Cottinet Locke; 1875; Chicago, Illinois, USA
- Died: November 27, 1939 (aged 63–64); New York City, New York, USA
- Occupations: Playwright, screenwriter and novelist
- Spouse(s): Frederic Hatton; John Kenneth Mackenzie

Fanny Hatton (1875 – November 27, 1939) was an American playwright and screenwriter known for the works she wrote with her husband/writing partner, Frederic Hatton. The couple, who had many of their works presented on Broadway—were known foremost for their comedies.

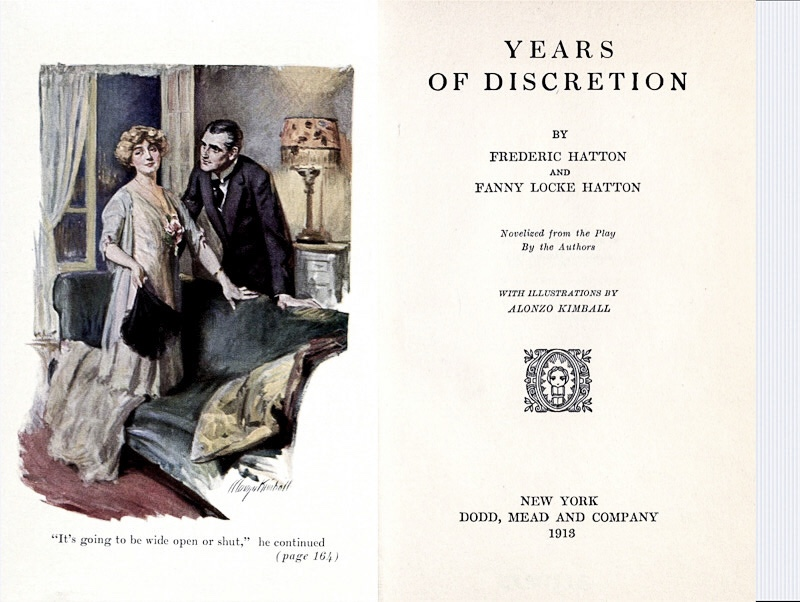
The Hattons' novelization of their 1912 play Years of Discretion; illustrations by Alonzo Kimball

== Biography ==
She began writing after her first husband, John Kenneth Mackenzie, was killed in Mexico in an incident that was widely covered. It was through her writing that she met Frederic Hatton, the drama critic who became her writing partner and second husband. Together they wrote dozens of plays and screenplays between 1912 and the early 1930s. Some of their Broadway productions include Years of Discretion (1912), The Great Lover (1915), Upstairs and Down (1916), Lombardi, Ltd. (1917), The Indestructible Wife (1918), The Squab Farm (1918), The Checkerboard (1920), We Girls (1921), Treat 'em Rough (1926), Synthetic Sin (1927), Love, Honor and Betray (1930), His Majesty's Car (1930), The Stork is Dead (1932), and The Great Lover (1932).

== Selected filmography ==
- The Squab Farm (1918)
- The Land of Hope (1921)
- Peacock Alley (1922)
- Big Dan (1923)
- South Sea Love (1923)
- The Wolf Man (1924)
- Married Flirts (1924)
- Circe the Enchantress (1924)
- Madonna of the Streets (1924)
- Star Dust Trail (1924)
- Curlytop (1924)
- Cheaper to Marry (1925)
- The Mad Whirl (1925)
- The Heart of a Siren (1925)
- The Love Gamble (1925)
- The Kiss Barrier (1925)
- Wreckage (1925)
- The Manicure Girl (1925)
- The Love Gamble (1925)
- Exchange of Wives (1925)
- Fifth Avenue (1926)
- The Auction Block (1926)
- Money Talks (1926)
- The Bugle Call (1927)
- A Woman Against the World (1928)
- The Man in Hobbles (1928)
- The Albany Night Boat (1928)
- The Tragedy of Youth (1928)
- Beautiful But Dumb (1928)
- Domestic Meddlers (1928)
- The Power of Silence (1928)
- The Spirit of Youth (1929)
- Painted Faces (1929)
- The Devil's Apple Tree (1929)
- Molly and Me (1929)
- My Lady's Past (1929)
- Father and Son (1929)
- The Bachelor Girl (1929)
- New Orleans (1929)
- Two Men and a Maid (1929)
- Her Unborn Child (1930)
- Damaged Love (1931)
- Just a Gigolo (1931)
- Tonight or Never (1931)
