= Edward Hearn (actor) =

American actor (1888–1963)

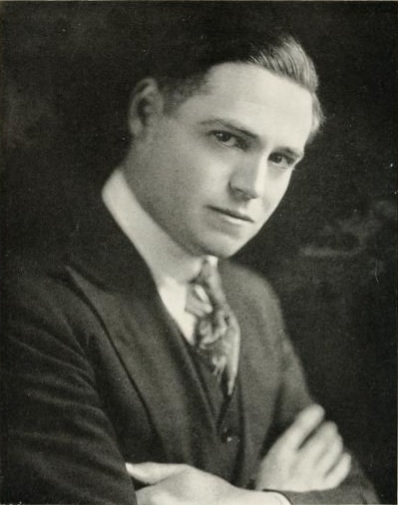
- Hearn c. 1920
- Born: September 6, 1888; Dayton, Washington, US
- Died: April 15, 1963 (aged 74); Los Angeles County, California, US
- Occupation: Actor
- Years active: 1915–55
- Spouse(s): Tryna Saindon (divorced); 1 child

Guy Edward Hearn (September 6, 1888 – April 15, 1963) was an American actor who, in a forty-year film career, starting in 1915, played hundreds of roles, starting with juvenile leads, then, briefly, as leading man, all during the silent era.

With the arrival of sound, he became a character actor, appearing in scores of productions for virtually every studio, in which he was mostly unbilled, while those credits in which he was listed, reflected at least nine stage names, most frequently Edward Hearn, but also Guy E. Hearn, Ed Hearn, Eddie Hearn, Eddie Hearne, and Edward Hearne.

== Leading man in silent films ==
Born in Dayton, Columbia County, Washington, He became an actor in his twenties, with a first known film credit listed in the 1915 short The Fool's Heart.

His initial feature was Her Bitter Cup in 1916, the year during which he was seen in sixteen shorts and features. 1917 was equally prolific for him, providing seventeen appearances. As short films gave way to features, the number of his annual productions decreased (four in 1918, four in 1919 and five in 1920), but he continued to work steadily, with film credits in every year of his career. He was third-billed in Faith, the 1920 production starring Peggy Hyland with J. Parks Jones, and had a supporting role that year in the serial, Daredevil Jack, a vehicle for boxing champion Jack Dempsey.

Engaged by Universal Pictures' early silent film subsidiary, Bluebird Photoplays, as leading man to Ruth Clifford in 1918's The Lure of Luxury, Hearn was subsequently put under contract with the low-budget studio Film Booking Offices of America (also known as FBO Pictures Corporation) and alternated between roles as leading man (to Ruth Renick in Tahiti-filmed The Fire Bride (1922), Jane Novak in Colleen of the Pines (1922), Gladys Walton The Town Scandal (1923), Laura La Plante Excitement (1924), and Josie Sedgwick in The Outlaw's Daughter (1925), and second leads, billed after Patsy Ruth Miller, Ralph Graves and Edna Murphy in Daughters of Today (1924).

In 1925, Hearn was fourth-billed as Clara Bow's brother in The Lawful Cheater, a crime drama fashioned as a vehicle for the flapper star, while he also had a rare first-billed role as the central character, Philip Nolan, in Fox Film Corporation's adaptation of Edward Everett Hale's classic short story, "The Man Without a Country". He was also top-billed in a minor 1924 western, The Devil's Partner, which not released until 1926, the year he was the human leading actor in a May vehicle for the dog star Peter the Great, a German Shepherd who, after appearing in one more film, was fatally shot in June.

In 1926, he was Helen Holmes' leading man in Perils of the Rail, while playing an unbilled cameo as a Union Army officer in another railroad-centered film, Buster Keaton's The General. In 1927, he was second-billed to Cornelius Keefe in Hook and Ladder No. 9, third-billed in the Larry Semon vehicle Spuds, the John Bowers–Anne Cornwall starrer The Heart of the Yukon and the Buffalo Bill, Jr. western series entry Pals in Peril, had lower-billed roles in four other films and played an unbilled bit in Cecil B. DeMille's The King of Kings.

== Character actor during sound era ==
In 1928, as Hearn reached his fortieth birthday, his changing fortunes were reflected through the six productions in which he appeared. He was still briefly cast as a leading man, but only to German Shepherds. "The New Pathé Dog Star, Cyclone" in the Spencer Gordon Bennet-directed Pathé Exchange serial The Yellow Cameo, was first, with the film's poster highlighting only the names of leading lady Allene Ray and Cyclone, while FBO's feature film "Dog Justice", another vehicle for a German Shepherd (this dog's name was Ranger), came second. The other four titles, however, placed him between fifth and eighth in their cast lists.

In the last of his 1928 titles, also his first sound film, December-released Ned McCobb's Daughter, he was billed below Irene Rich, Theodore Roberts, Robert Armstrong and George Barraud, and directly above future star Carol (Carole) Lombard. As sound films began to make greater inroads at the start of 1929, Hearn's five films that year indicated a further downward spiral. He was second-billed (to Sam Nelson, who co-starred with Ranger in five other 1927–29 films) in another silent Ranger vehicle, The One Man Dog and third-billed (above Thelma Todd) in the William Collier, Jr. - Jacqueline Logan pairing for Columbia Pictures' part-talkie The Bachelor Girl.

In the remaining three titles, however, his billing was much lower. Frank Capra's first sound film, The Donovan Affair listed him eleventh and another talkie mystery, Universal's The Drake Case, a posthumous release for its star, Gladys Brockwell, listed him eighth. Both of these dialogue-laden productions, exist only in silent versions, following the loss of their sound discs. The last of Hearn's 1929 releases, the western Hell's Heroes, left him with a small unbilled role.

In 1930 Hearn had small supporting roles in three features and an unbilled part in a Charley Chase - Thelma Todd Hal Roach two-reeler, but it was 1931 that set the pattern for the remainder of his career. Forty-three years old in September of that year, he appeared in sixteen features and one short, with nine of those roles being unbilled. For each year, until 1945, he had an uninterrupted run of credits, most of them unbilled. Returning to film work in 1950, he again accumulated numerous credits until the end of 1953. His final two credits, both unbilled, were in 1955's This Island Earth and Tall Man Riding. His television work was limited to a 1952 episode of Cowboy G-Men and a 1953 episode of The Lone Ranger, both of which were early TV series aimed at a juvenile audience.

== Personal life ==
Eight years after his 1955 retirement, Guy Edward Hearn died in Los Angeles County at the age of 74. He was married to French Canadian Tryda Saindon from the mid-1910s until at least June 1930, as indicated in that year's decennial census. They were the parents of one child, Edward, born in Los Angeles during summer of 1916.

== Filmography ==
- Her Bitter Cup (1916) as Walter Burke
- Her Defiance (1916) as Frank Warren
- The Whirlpool of Destiny (1916) as Davidson
- The Double Room Mystery (1917) as Silver Joe
- Her Soul's Inspiration (1917) as Silent Bob
- Treason (1917) as Danick Rysson
- The Man from Tia Juana as Larry Kerwin (*uncredited)
- The Lost Express (1917) as Francis Murphy
- Lawless Love (1918) as Freddie Montgomery
- The Mask (1918) as Sam Joplin
- The Lure of Luxury (1918) as John Coventry
- The Light of Western Stars (1918) as Al Hammond
- Whom the Gods Would Destroy (1919)
- Jacques of the Silver North (1919) as Warren Sherman
- Over the Garden Wall (1919) as Stanley Davis
- Daredevil Jack (1920) as Cyril Dennison
- Faith (1920) as Dr. George Kyle
- Into the Light (1920) as The Boy
- Down Home (1920) as Chet Todd
- The Coast of Opportunity (1920) as Tommy De Boer
- The Avenging Arrow (1921) as Ralph Troy
- All Dolled Up (1921) as James Montgomery Johnson
- Keeping Up with Lizzie (1921) as Dan Pettigrew
- The Face of the World (1921) as Harold Mark
- The Honor of Rameriz (1921, Short) as The Thief
- The Spirit of the Lake (1921, Short)
- The Fire Bride (1922) as Steve Maitland
- A Question of Honor (1922) as Bill Shannon
- The Truthful Liar (1922) as David Haggard
- The Glory of Clementina (1922) as Tommy Burgrave
- Her Night of Nights (1922) as Jerry Trimble
- Colleen of the Pines (1922) as Barry O'Neil
- The Flirt (1922) as Richard Lindley
- Mind Over Motor (1923) as Starter
- The Love Letter (1923) as Bill Carter
- The Town Scandal (1923) as Toby Caswell
- The Miracle Baby (1923) as Hal Norton
- Daytime Wives (1923) as Ben Branscom
- Daughters of Today (1924) as Peter Farnham
- When a Man's a Man (1924) as Stanley Manning
- Excitement (1924) as Arthur Drew
- The Dangerous Blonde (1924) as Royall Randall
- The Turmoil (1924) as Roscoe Sheridan
- Winner Take All (1924) as Jack Hamilton
- As No Man Has Loved (1925) as Lt. Philip Nolan
- The Lawful Cheater (1925) as Roy Burns
- Perils of the Rail (1925) as Jack Hathaway
- The Outlaw's Daughter (1925) as Jim King
- One of the Bravest (1925) as Dan Kelly
- Daring Days (1925) as Catamount
- The Devil's Partner (1926) as Glen Wilson
- Daniel Boone Thru the Wilderness (1926) as The Stranger
- The Still Alarm (1926) as Tom Brand
- The Sign of the Claw (1926) as Robert Conway
- With Davy Crockett at the Fall of the Alamo (1926) as Fred Warren
- The General (1926) as Union Officer (uncredited)
- Winners of the Wilderness (1927) as Gen. George Washington
- Spuds (1927) as Captain Arthur
- The King of Kings (1927) (uncredited)
- The Heart of the Yukon (1927) as Jack Waite
- Pals in Peril (1927) as Blackie Burns
- The Hero on Horseback (1927) as Harvey Grey
- The Harvester (1927) as Dr. Harmon
- Hook and Ladder No. 9 (1927) as Dan Duffy
- Hot Heels (1927) as Gambler
- The Desert Pirate (1927) as Norton
- The Yellow Cameo (1928) as Terry Lawton
- Dog Justice (1928) as Jimmie O'Neil
- The Fightin' Redhead (1928) as Jim Dalton
- The Big Hop (1928) as Pilot
- Ned McCobb's Daughter (1928) as Butterworth
- The One Man Dog (1929) as Pierre
- The Donovan Affair (1929) as Nelson
- The Bachelor Girl (1929) as Campbell
- The Drake Case (1929) as Edmonds / Butler
- Hell's Heroes (1929) as Frank Edwards (uncredited)
- Hide-Out (1930) as Coach Latham
- The Spoilers (1930) as Lieutenant
- Reno (1930) as Tom Hodge
- One Night at Susie's (1930) as Policeman (uncredited)
- The Painted Desert (1931) as Tex
- Dirigible (1931) as Admiral's Aide (uncredited)
- The Avenger (1931) as Captain Paul Lake
- Clearing the Range (1931) as Jim Fremont
- Ladies' Man (1931) as Maitre D' (uncredited)
- The Texas Ranger (1931) as Texas Ranger Capt. Edwards (uncredited)
- Up for Murder (1931) as Policeman (uncredited)
- The Vanishing Legion (1931) as Jed Williams
- A Son of the Plains (1931) as Buck Brokaw
- Smart Money (1931) as Reporter (uncredited)
- Ex-Bad Boy (1931) as Assistant Manager (uncredited)
- Broadminded (1931) as Man at Fire Escape Window (uncredited)
- Bad Girl (1931) as Male Nurse (uncredited)
- The Galloping Ghost (1931, Serial) as Clay College Coach Harlow
- Local Boy Makes Good (1931) as Relay Caller (uncredited)
- The Cheyenne Cyclone (1931) as J.C. 'Flash' Corbin
- Emma (1932) as Haskins' Assistant (uncredited)
- The Rainbow Trail (1932) as Jim Lassiter (uncredited)
- The Sunset Trail (1932) as Bank Teller (uncredited)
- The Local Bad Man (1932) as Ben Murdock
- The Shadow of the Eagle (1932, Serial) as Col. Nathan Gregory
- The Texas Tornado (1932) as Fanner Durkin
- State's Attorney (1932) as Court Reporter (uncredited)
- The Last of the Mohicans (1932, Serial) as Col. Munro
- Unashamed (1932) as Mr. Ogden's Secretary (uncredited)
- Ann Carver's Profession (1933) as Dinner Party Guest (uncredited)
- Fighting with Kit Carson (1933) as Henchman Morgan
- Her First Mate (1933) as Ferry Captain (uncredited)
- Penthouse (1933) as Detective (uncredited)
- Golden Harvest (1933) as Pierce (uncredited)
- I'm No Angel (1933) as Court Clerk (uncredited)
- Eskimo (1933) as Captain's Mate (uncredited)
- Roman Scandals (1933) as Roman Citizen (uncredited)
- Son of a Sailor (1933) as Admiral (uncredited)
- The Mystery Squadron (1933, Serial) as Sheriff [Chs. 2–3, 12]
- Fugitive Lovers (1934) as Detective (uncredited)
- Cross Country Cruise (1934) as Bus Passenger (uncredited)
- The Show-Off (1934) as Automobile Attendant (uncredited)
- Stolen Sweets (1934) as Ship's Captain (uncredited)
- Monte Carlo Nights (1934) as Detective (uncredited)
- The Thin Man (1934) as Detective (uncredited)
- Burn 'Em Up Barnes (1934, Serial) as Henchman Parker [Chs. 2-5] (uncredited)
- Whom the Gods Destroy (1934) as Balkan Passenger (uncredited)
- Fighting Hero (1934) as Bert Hawley
- Paris Interlude (1934) as Reporter (uncredited)
- The Cat's-Paw (1934) as Radio Listener (uncredited)
- The Count of Monte Cristo (1934) as Signalman (uncredited)
- Fighting Through (1934) as Lennie Lenihan
- The Law of the Wild (1934, Serial) as Spectator (uncredited)
- King Kelly of the U.S.A. (1934) as Mop Salesman (uncredited)
- Young and Beautiful (1934) as Movie Director (uncredited)
- Belle of the Nineties (1934) as Croupier (uncredited)
- Wake Up and Dream (1934) as Reporter (uncredited)
- Lady by Choice (1934) as Detective (uncredited)
- Against the Law (1934) as Fireman (uncredited)
- In Old Santa Fe (1934) as Tracy Henchman (uncredited)
- Jealousy (1934) as Cop (uncredited)
- Flirting with Danger (1934) as San Rico Plant Supervisor
- Mystery Mountain (1934, Serial) as Lake
- Sing Sing Nights (1934) as Governor's Aide (uncredited)
- Forsaking All Others (1934) as Party Guest (uncredited)
- The Whole Town's Talking (1935) as Policeman Announcing Carpenter (uncredited)
- Naughty Marietta (1935) as Mercenary Scout (uncredited)
- Behind the Green Lights (1935) as Detective Brewster
- The Miracle Rider (1935) as Emil Janss
- The Headline Woman (1935) as Headwaiter (uncredited)
- Let 'Em Have It (1935) as Desk Sergeant (uncredited)
- Public Hero No. 1 (1935) as Policeman in Pursuing Car (uncredited)
- Ladies Crave Excitement (1935) as Guard (uncredited)
- Westward Ho (1935) as Townsman (uncredited)
- Page Miss Glory (1935) as Detective (uncredited)
- Diamond Jim (1935) as Job Applicant (uncredited)
- Tumbling Tumbleweeds (1935) as Barney Craven
- Red Salute (1935) as Border Patrolman (uncredited)
- Streamline Express (1935) as Mack - Purser
- Hot Off the Press (1935)
- Confidential (1935) as Insp. Stone
- The Rainmakers (1935) as Farmer (uncredited)
- A Tale of Two Cities (1935) as Leader at Bastille (uncredited)
- Bulldog Courage (1935) as Clayton - Henchman
- The Mysterious Avenger (1936) as Cattleman (uncredited)
- Black Gold (1936) as Oilman Lease Holder (uncredited)
- The Bridge of Sighs (1936) as Police Clerk (uncredited)
- The Lawless Nineties (1936) as Townsman (uncredited)
- The Leathernecks Have Landed (1936) as Marine Officer (uncredited)
- The Preview Murder Mystery (1936) as Officer (uncredited)
- Red River Valley (1936) as Sheriff Ed
- King of the Pecos (1936) as Eli Jackson
- Silly Billies (1936) as Mark - Martin's Brother (uncredited)
- Moonlight Murder (1936) as Police Surgeon (uncredited)
- Avenging Waters (1936) as Foreman Jim (uncredited)
- The Three Wise Guys (1936) as Cop
- The Cattle Thief (1936) as Chet (uncredited)
- Easy Money (1936) as Cop (uncredited)
- San Francisco (1936) as Parishioner (uncredited)
- High Tension (1936) as Businessman (uncredited)
- His Brother's Wife (1936) as Laboratory Technician (uncredited)
- Missing Girls (1936) as Police Officer
- Lady Luck (1936) as Bill - a Cop (uncredited)
- The Unknown Ranger (1936) as Jim Wright
- Ride 'Em Cowboy (1936) as Man at Dance (uncredited)
- The President's Mystery (1936) as Meeting Moderator (uncredited)
- I Cover Chinatown (1936) as Herbert - Tourist Husband (uncredited)
- 15 Maiden Lane (1936) as Detective Thomas (uncredited)
- The Man I Marry (1936) as Chauffuer (uncredited)
- Mad Holiday (1936) as Policeman (uncredited)
- The Big Show (1936) as Studio Man (uncredited)
- The Accusing Finger (1936) as Bailiff (uncredited)
- The Boss Rider of Gun Creek (1936) as Mal MacGregor
- The Mighty Treve (1937) as Second Dog Show Judge
- The Devil's Playground (1937) as Surgeon (uncredited)
- Sandflow (1937) as Liveryman (uncredited)
- Penrod and Sam (1937) as 2nd G-Man (uncredited)
- A Star Is Born (1937) as Sanitarium Attendant (uncredited)
- Anything for a Thrill (1937) as Collins
- It Can't Last Forever (1937) as Federal Man (uncredited)
- Exclusive (1937) as Policeman (uncredited)
- Souls at Sea (1937) as Courtroom Spectator (uncredited)
- Bad Guy (1937) as Policeman Driving Kitty (uncredited)
- It Happened in Hollywood (1937) as Cop (uncredited)
- Something to Sing About (1937) as Studio Guard (uncredited)
- Life Begins with Love (1937) as Detective (uncredited)
- Ali Baba Goes to Town (1937) as Sentry (uncredited)
- Trouble at Midnight (1937) as DeHoff
- The Old Wyoming Trail (1937) as Hammond
- Springtime in the Rockies (1937) as Jed Thorpe
- Paid to Dance (1937) as Butler
- Headin' East (1937) as Rancher (uncredited)
- The Shadow (1937) as Circus Doctor
- Man-Proof (1938) as Ticket Man (uncredited)
- My Old Kentucky Home (1938) (uncredited)
- Penitentiary (1938) as Prison Guard with Telegram (uncredited)
- Assassin of Youth (1938) as Doctor (uncredited)
- Go Chase Yourself (1938) as Jack - Raffle Seller in Bank (uncredited)
- International Crime (1938) as Policeman (uncredited)
- Professor Beware (1938) as Cop (uncredited)
- The Main Event (1938) as Detective (uncredited)
- Young Fugitives (1938) as Legion Commander (uncredited)
- The Great Adventures of Wild Bill Hickok (1938, Serial) as Tom Stedman (Ch's 14–15) (uncredited)
- Fast Company (1938) as Policeman (uncredited)
- You Can't Take It with You (1938) as Court Attendant (uncredited)
- Boys Town (1938) as Train Guard (uncredited)
- Juvenile Court (1938) as Cop in PAL Office (uncredited)
- West of the Santa Fe (1938) as Crane
- The Spider's Web (1938, Serial) as Police Desk Sergeant (uncredited)
- Red Barry (1938, serial) as Detective O'Hara (uncredited)
- Gang Bullets (1938) as Detective Craig (uncredited)
- Sweethearts (1938) as Party Guest (uncredited)
- Stand Up and Fight (1939) as Joe (uncredited)
- The Lone Wolf Spy Hunt (1939) as Precinct Night Sergeant (uncredited)
- St. Louis Blues (1939) as Actor (uncredited)
- Texas Stampede (1939) as Owens
- Rollin' Westward (1939) as Poker Player (uncredited)
- I Was a Convict (1939) as McGee, a Guard (uncredited)
- Sergeant Madden (1939) as Guard in Jail (uncredited)
- Let Us Live (1939) as Detective Carson (uncredited)
- Broadway Serenade (1939) as Frank (uncredited)
- Union Pacific (1939) as Sergeant (uncredited)
- Man of Conquest (1939) as Minor Role (uncredited)
- Western Caravans (1939) as Rancher (uncredited)
- Dick Tracy's G-Men (1939) as Forest Ranger (uncredited)
- Thunder Afloat (1939) as Fisherman (uncredited)
- Fast and Furious (1939) as Turnkey (uncredited)
- Smashing the Money Ring (1939) as Guard Muldoon (uncredited)
- Bad Little Angel (1939) as Fireman (uncredited)
- Another Thin Man (1939) as Detective (uncredited)
- The Stranger from Texas (1939) as Marshal Ritchie (uncredited)
- Nick Carter, Master Detective (1939) as Deputy (uncredited)
- Wolf of New York (1940) as Cop (uncredited)
- Chasing Trouble (1940) as Callahan's Boss (uncredited)
- My Little Chickadee (1940) as Barfly Drinking Panther (uncredited)
- The Man from Dakota (1940) as Confederate Captain (uncredited)
- The Ghost Comes Home (1940) as Townsman at Banquet (uncredited)
- Son of the Navy (1940) as Desk Sgt. Flaherty (uncredited)
- Dark Command (1940) as Jury Foreman (uncredited)
- Two Girls on Broadway (1940) as Doorman (uncredited)
- Covered Wagon Days (1940) as Captain Hudson (uncredited)
- Edison, the Man (1940) as Broker (uncredited)
- Gangs of Chicago (1940) as Policeman at Crime Scene (uncredited)
- Florian (1940) as Policeman (uncredited)
- Phantom Raiders (1940) as Officer on the Orchid (uncredited)
- New Moon (1940) as Bondsman (uncredited)
- Adventures of Red Ryder (1940, Serial) as Colonel Lang [Ch. 1] (uncredited)
- Sporting Blood (1940) as Bank Guard (uncredited)
- We Who Are Young (1940) as Turnkey (uncredited)
- Deadwood Dick (1940, Serial) as Tom Sharp (uncredited)
- I Love You Again (1940) as Observer of Man Overboard (uncredited)
- Sky Murder (1940) as Man in Monrose's Office (uncredited)
- The Green Archer as Cop (uncredited)
- Little Nellie Kelly (1940) as Second Court Clerk (uncredited)
- Remedy for Riches (1940) as Police Patrolman-Driver (uncredited)
- Go West (1940) as Man at Saloon Door (uncredited)
- Santa Fe Trail (1940) as Abolitionist in Armory (uncredited)
- The Green Hornet Strikes Again! (1940, Serial) as Patrol Cop (uncredited)
- The Wild Man of Borneo (1941) (scenes deleted)
- White Eagle (1941, Serial) as Mr. Gardner (uncredited)
- Meet John Doe (1941) as Mayor's Secretary (uncredited)
- Love Crazy (1941) as Policeman (uncredited)
- The Get-Away (1941) as Policeman Outside Dance Hall (uncredited)
- Caught in the Draft (1941) as Operation Manager (uncredited)
- Blossoms in the Dust (1941) as Mill Worker (uncredited)
- Lady Be Good (1941) as Bailiff (uncredited)
- Honky Tonk (1941) as Poker Player on Train (uncredited)
- Holt of the Secret Service (1941) as Agent Jim Layton
- Shadow of the Thin Man (1941) as Policeman in Molly's Office (uncredited)
- Unholy Partners (1941) as Newspaperman Listening to Teletype Report (uncredited)
- Sullivan's Travels (1941) as Policeman at Beverly Hills Station (uncredited)
- Steel Against the Sky (1941) as Minor Role (scenes deleted)
- Dick Tracy vs. Crime, Inc. (1941, Serial) as Cutter Captain (uncredited)
- Pacific Blackout (1941) as Sergeant (uncredited)
- Don Winslow of the Navy (1942, Serial) as Mill Henchman [Chs. 5-6] (uncredited)
- Nazi Agent (1942) as Reporter (uncredited)
- The Vanishing Virginian (1942) as Juror (uncredited)
- Dr. Kildare's Victory (1942) as Accident Bystander (uncredited)
- Klondike Fury (1942) as Medical Board Member (uncredited)
- My Favorite Blonde (1942) as Train Official (uncredited)
- I Was Framed (1942) as Policeman (uncredited)
- Kid Glove Killer (1942) as Truck Driver Eating at Eddire's (uncredited)
- Fingers at the Window (1942) as Citizen (uncredited)
- Mokey (1942) as Policeman (uncredited)
- Dr. Broadway (1942) as Jim - Policeman (uncredited)
- Jackass Mail (1942) as Miner (uncredited)
- Sabotage Squad (1942) as Foreman (uncredited)
- Cairo (1942) as Cavity Rock Townsman / Egyptian with Trampolines (uncredited)
- The Talk of the Town (1942) as Sergeant (uncredited)
- Baby Face Morgan (1942) as Payoff Victim in Montage (uncredited)
- The Omaha Trail (1942) as Man without Oxen to Sell (uncredited)
- Northwest Rangers (1942) as Gambler (uncredited)
- Journey for Margaret (1942) as Air-Raid Warden at Fire (uncredited)
- Air Raid Wardens (1943) as Plant Watchman (uncredited)
- A Stranger in Town (1943) as Courtroom Spectator (uncredited)
- The Desperadoes (1943) as Armed Townsman (uncredited)
- Swing Shift Maisie (1943) as Plant Guard (uncredited)
- Lost Angel (1943) as Reporter (uncredited)
- Shine On, Harvest Moon (1944) as Disturbed Patron (uncredited)
- And the Angels Sing (1944) as Squad Car Policeman (uncredited)
- An American Romance (1944) as Mill Gateman (uncredited)
- The Great Flamarion (1945) as Vagrant on Park Bench (uncredited)
- Saratoga Trunk (1945) as Man with Lantern (uncredited)
- The Great Jewel Robber (1950) as Canadian Desk Sergeant (uncredited)
- Atom Man vs. Superman (1950, Serial) as Prof. Stone [Chs. 3-4] (uncredited)
- Storm Warning (1951) as Mr. Rainey (uncredited)
- Sugarfoot (1951) as Auction Merchant (uncredited)
- Raton Pass (1951) as Treadwell - Lawyer (uncredited)
- Lightning Strikes Twice (1951) as Hank (uncredited)
- Strangers on a Train (1951) as Lt. Campbell (uncredited)
- Tomorrow Is Another Day (1951) as Prison Guard (uncredited)
- Pistol Harvest (1951) as Terry Moran
- Road Agent (1952) as Sheriff Quillin
- Carson City (1952) as Sheriff (uncredited)
- The Kid from Broken Gun (1952) as Jury Foreman (uncredited)
- My Man and I (1952) as Deputy (uncredited)
- Springfield Rifle (1952) as Calhoun (uncredited)
- The Man Behind the Gun (1953) as Maj. Nichols (uncredited)
- Count the Hours (1953) as Howard Combes (uncredited)
- Port Sinister (1953) as Capt. Crawley
- Powder River (1953) as Man on Horse (uncredited)
- Conquest of Cochise (1953) as Gen. Gadsden (uncredited)
- Three Sailors and a Girl (1953) as Workman (uncredited)
- This Island Earth (1955) as Reporter (uncredited)
- Tall Man Riding (1955) as Townsman (uncredited)
