= Georgia Hale =

American silent actress (1900–1985)

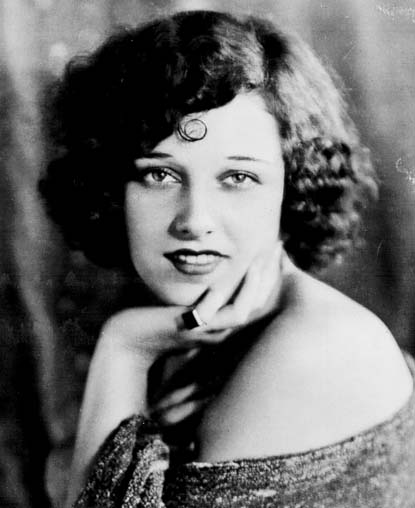
- Hale in The Gold Rush (1925)
- Born: Georgia Theodora Hale; July 28, 1900; St. Joseph, Missouri, U.S.
- Died: June 17, 1985 (aged 84); Hollywood, California, U.S.
- Other names: Gia, Rose, Geanna
- Occupation: Actress
- Years active: 1914–1975

Georgia Theodora Hale (June 25, 1900 — June 17, 1985) was an actress of the silent movie era.

Hale rose to film stardom in 1925 under the auspices of directors Josef von Sternberg in The Salvation Hunters and Charlie Chaplin in The Gold Rush. Hale retired from acting in 1931 after appearing in about a dozen silent and sound films.

Hale’s 1995 memoir Charlie Chaplin: Intimate Close-Ups is one of the few accounts that provides highly personal and professional insights into Hollywood directors Chaplin and von Sternberg.

== Early life ==
Georgia Hale was born on June 25, 1900 to George Washington Hale and his spouse Laura Imbrie of St. Joseph, Missouri. She was the youngest of three daughters (Eugenia, b. 16 March 1896, Helen, b. 19 August 1898). Her father, preoccupied with his duties as a telephone company operations manager, provided the family with a middle-class income; her mother, an avid homemaker, was solely responsible for raising the girls. Hale reports that her father did not hide his disappointment that she had not been born the male heir he had hoped for. In Hale’s 1995 posthumously published memoir Charlie Chaplin: Intimate Close-Ups, her upbringing appears fraught with sibling rivalries, and by her own account, was not a nurturing or affectionate home environment.

The family moved to a suburb of Englewood, Illinois in early 1903, and where Hale would graduate from high school. In June 1918, her yearbook reports that Hale, in performing the role of Ralph Rackstraw in the Gilbert and Sullivan’s light opera H. M. S. Pinafore, had "made her justly famous" on campus.

== Career ==
An aspiring singer, Hale attended a Chicago musical college in 1920, appearing in the Chicago Winter Follies - her first theatrical engagement. Hale had become infatuated with actor Charlie Chaplin’s screen persona while in her teens. In the summer of 1920, she reports in her memoir that she had a chance encounter with Charlie Chaplin on Michigan Boulevard, where they exchanged hellos.

In August 1922, Hale was selected among twenty contestants as winner of the Chicago “Queen of the Pageant” beauty contest. The event was attended by heavyweight boxing champion Jack Dempsey, as well as United States Attorney General Hubert Work of the Warren G. Harding administration, personally crowned “Miss Chicago.” Hale was presented with a $2500 cash prize and received offers to appear in films. In late 1922, she traveled to New York to begin her movie career.

Hale performed uncredited supporting roles in a number of features over the next several months. The only picture that has been positively identified among these is Enemies of Women (1923), starring Lionel Barrymore and directed by Alan Crosland. After a brief visit to her ailing mother in Chicago in the spring of 1923, Hale left for Hollywood, California.

In Hollywood, Hale’s career was advanced when she was selected, based purely on her poise and physical beauty, by a panel of celebrity judges to provide a screen test supervised by actor Frank Mayo. Awarded with a short-term movie contract, Hale appeared in the highly successful Three Weeks (1924), each directed by Rupert Hughes. Like many of her female contemporaries in Hollywood, Hale’s attractive physique garnered her bit parts as a “bathing beauty” in a number of films, including The Temple of Venus (1923).

The documentary Unknown Chaplin revealed that Hale was hired by Chaplin to replace actress Virginia Cherrill as the female lead in the film City Lights (1931) during a brief period after he had fired Cherrill (and before he re-hired her). Approximately seven minutes of test footage of Hale in the role survives; this is included in the DVD release of the film, and excerpts appear in Unknown Chaplin. The editor's introduction to Hale's memoir also reveals that she was Chaplin's original choice for the female lead in his film The Circus, a role eventually played by Merna Kennedy.

=== The Salvation Hunters (1925) ===
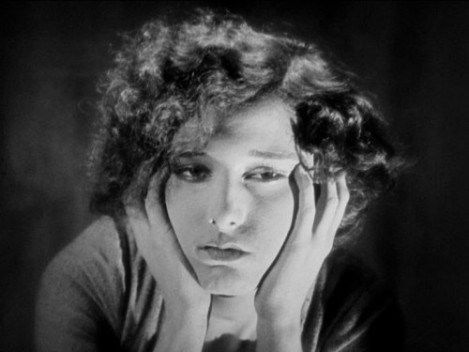
The Salvation Hunters (film) 1925 Georgia Hale as "The Girl"

While working as an extra on By Divine Right (1924), Hale met Joseph “Jo” Sternberg who was serving as assistant director on the picture. He would soon adopt the nobiliary particle “von,” inserted in the film’s credits, as his professional name.

In his 1965 memoir Fun in a Chinese Laundry, Sternberg recalled his first encounter with Hale, describing her as “this Galatea.” Sternberg immediately expressed a keen professional interest in Hale, praising her “fine qualities…her inner fire and courage” and in particular her “sullen charm.” At the time, Sternberg was in collaboration with actor/producer George K. Arthur, preparing to write and direct a self-financed independent picture, unconnected with the Hollywood studio system. Without elaborating on her role, Sternberg offered Hale the lead, and she accepted. Months later, in early 1924, filming commenced in San Pedro, California. The feature, financed on a shoestring, cost approximately $4000-$5000 to make. According to Sternberg, he paid Hale $7.50 per day, the minimum “dress extra” rate.

The Salvation Hunters was completed in November 1924, but Knight and Sternberg had difficulty locating an exhibitor, as the picture had no studio sponsors. In desperation, Arthur approached Charlie Chaplin’s valet and factotum Toraichi Kono at the Chaplin’s Benedict Canyon, Los Angeles estate. At Knight’s request, Kono agreed to arrange a private viewing for Chaplin and his colleague at United Artists, Douglas Fairbanks. The pair were favorably impressed with the picture. A private executive showing was arranged F. B. O. Studios, with the cast invited United Artists purchased the film rights for $20,000 from Knight and Sternberg, and provided a limited release. Chaplin announced the screening of the film to the public in The New York Times entertainment section. Though not a box office success, The Salvation Hunters was ranked among the top 10 films for 1925 by trade paper Film Mercury.

Hale reports in her memoir that Chaplin had been particularly impressed with her performance as the leading female protagonist, “The Girl.” At the F. B. O. showing, Chaplin praised her talent and took a personal interest in her career.

=== The Gold Rush (1925) ===
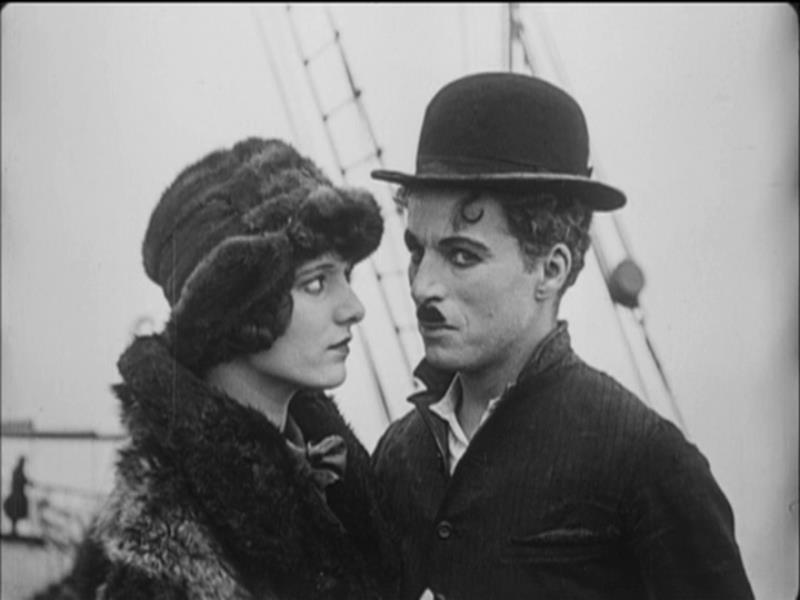
Charlie and Georgia Hale in the Gold Rush

In January 1924, Chaplin began production for his masterpiece The Gold Rush. The 16-year-old Lita Grey had been contracted to play opposite Chaplin as the dance-hall girl Georgia, but she was disqualified when she disclosed she was pregnant. The 17-year-old Carol Lombard (later spelled 'Carole') was also considered for the role.

Douglas Fairbanks had signed Hale to a one-year contract with Elton Film corp to play opposite him in his upcoming film Don Q, Son of Zorro (1925). Chaplin managed to lift her contract from Fairbanks - Hale was immediately given screen tests and enlisted for the part opposite him in The Gold Rush.

The Gold Rush had its world premiere at Grauman's Egyptian Theatre on June 26, 1925. New York Times critic Mordaunt Hall, in an August 1925 review, notes that Georgia Hale provided “a most natural performance” as the Klondike dance hall entertainer Georgia.

== Personal life ==
Hale was a close companion of Chaplin in the late 1920s and early 1930s. She went on to teach dance and later became wealthy through real estate investments in Southern California. She never married, but she lived with a male companion for the last 15 years of her life, and he received most of her estate upon her death on June 17, 1985.

According to her memoir, Hale became a follower of Christian Science. She met with Chaplin during his brief return to the United States in 1972.

== Writings ==
Hale spoke warmly of her time with Chaplin in Unknown Chaplin. She also wrote a book about her experiences with him, titled Charlie Chaplin: Intimate Close-Ups. Written in the 1960s, it was published in 1995, a decade after her death, by The Scarecrow Press; Heather Kiernan edited the manuscript.

== Filmography ==
Year	Title	Role	Notes
1924	No More Women	Marjorie	Uncredited; Lost film
1924	For Sale	Dancer	Uncredited
1925	The Salvation Hunters	The Girl	
1925	The Gold Rush	Georgia	
1926	The Rainmaker	Nell Wendell	Lost film
1926	The Great Gatsby	Myrtle Wilson	Lost film
1926	Man of the Forest	Nancy Raynor	Lost film
1927	Hills of Peril	Ellen	Lost film
1927	The Wheel of Destiny		Lost film
1928	A Woman Against the World	Carol Hill	Lost film
1928	The Rawhide Kid	Jessica Silverberg	Lost film
1928	The Last Moment	Second Wife	Lost film
1928	A Trick of Hearts	Connie Meade	Lost film
1928	Gypsy of the North	Alice Culhane	Incomplete film
1928	The Floating College	Frances Bixby	Lost film
1931	The Lightning Warrior	Dianne La Farge	final film role

== Sources ==
- Eyman, Scott 2023. Charlie Chaplin vs. America: When Art, Sex and Politics Collided. Simon & Schuster, New York. ISBN 978-1-9821-7635-8
- Hale, Georgia. 1995. Charlie Chaplin: Intimate Close-ups. The Scarecrow Press, Lanham, Maryland. Heather Kiernan, editor. ISBN 1-57886-004-0
- Hall, Mordaunt. 1925. “THE SCREEN; Charlie Chaplin's New Comedy.” The New York Times, August 17, 1925. https://www.nytimes.com/1925/08/17/archives/the-screen-charlie-chaplins-new-comedy.html Retrieved 10 March 2024.
- Jacobs, Lewis. 1967. The Rise of the American Film: Experimental Cinema in America, 1921-1947. Teachers College Press, Teacher’s College, Columbia University, New York. Library of Congress Catalog Number: 68-25845
- Kiernan, Heather. 1999. Introduction to Charlie Chaplin: Intimate Close-ups. The Scarecrow Press, Lanham, Maryland. Heather Kiernan, editor. ISBN 1-57886-004-0
- Sarris, Andrew. 1966. The Films of Josef von Sternberg. New York: Doubleday, 1966. ASIN B000LQTJG4
- Vance, Jeffery. 2014. The Gold Rush. San Francisco Silent Film Festival. https://silentfilm.org/the-gold-rush/ Retrieved 10 March 2024.
