= Hills of Peril =

1927 film

- Directed by: Lambert Hillyer
- Written by: George Abbott (play); Jack Jungmeyer
- Produced by: William Fox
- Starring: Buck Jones; Georgia Hale
- Cinematography: Reginald Lyons
- Distributed by: Fox Film Corporation
- Release date: May 1, 1927
- Running time: 5 reels
- Country: United States
- Languages: Silent; English intertitles

Hills of Peril is a lost 1927 American silent Western film directed by Lambert Hillyer and starring Buck Jones and Georgia Hale. It was produced and distributed by Fox Film Corporation.

== Cast ==
- Buck Jones as Laramie
- Georgia Hale as Ellen
- Albert J. Smith as Rand
- Buck Black as Grimes's boy
- William Welch as Grimes
- Marjorie Beebe as Sophia
- Duke Green as Jake
- Charles Athloff as Ezra
- Bob Kortman as Red (* as Robert Kortman per AFI)
