= Gypsy of the North =

1928 film by Scott Pembroke

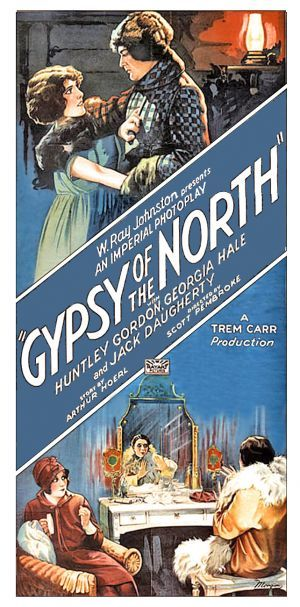
- Poster
- Directed by: Scott Pembroke
- Written by: Arthur Hoerl
- Based on: story by Howard Emmett Rogers
- Produced by: Trem Carr; W. Ray Johnston
- Starring: Georgia Hale
- Cinematography: Hap Depew
- Edited by: Charles A. Post
- Distributed by: Rayart Pictures
- Release date: March 1928
- Running time: 60 minutes
- Country: United States
- Language: Silent (English intertitles)

Gypsy of the North is a 1928 American silent drama film directed by Scott Pembroke and starring Georgia Hale. It was produced by Trem Carr Productions and distributed by Rayart.

== Cast ==
- Georgia Hale as Alice Culhane
- Huntley Gordon as Steve Farrell
- Jack Dougherty as Chappie Evans
- William Quinn as Baptiste
- Hugh Saxon as Davey
- Henry Roquemore as Theatre Manager
- Erin La Bissoniere as Jane

== Censorship ==
When Gypsy of the North was released, many states and cities in the United States had censor boards that could require cuts or other eliminations before the film could be shown. The Kansas censor board ordered a cut of a close-up view of United States currency. Many American censor boards followed this rule involving close-ups of money.

== Preservation ==
An incomplete copy of Gypsy of the North is in the Library of Congress.
