= Her Secret =

1933 film

- Directed by: Warren Millais
- Written by: Helen Mitchell
- Produced by: Helen Mitchell
- Starring: Sari Maritza; William Collier Jr. Alan Mowbray
- Cinematography: J. Peverell Marley
- Edited by: Martin G. Cohn
- Music by: Jamie Erickson
- Production company: Helen Mitchell Productions
- Distributed by: Ideal Pictures
- Release date: December 19, 1933
- Running time: 73 minutes
- Country: United States
- Language: English

Her Secret is a 1933 American comedy drama film directed by Warren Millais and starring Sari Maritza, William Collier Jr. and Alan Mowbray. It was released in the United Kingdom under the alternative title of The Girl from Georgia, and was based on a play by Maude Fulton.

== Cast ==
- Sari Maritza as Waffles
- William Collier Jr. as Johnny Norton
- Alan Mowbray as Nils Norton
- Ivan F. Simpson as Lathrop
- Monaei Lindley as Ermine, Johnny's Girlfriend
- Rex Armond as Tex, Waffles' Friend
- Jack Dewees as Kenneth
- Barbara Luddy as Mae
- Leila McIntyre as Dean of Women
- John Hyams as Dean of Men
- Grace Valentine as Mary
- Mary Lee Manning as College Student
- Bert James as College Boy
- Barry Thompson as College Bad Boy
