= Sari Maritza =

British actress (1910–1987)

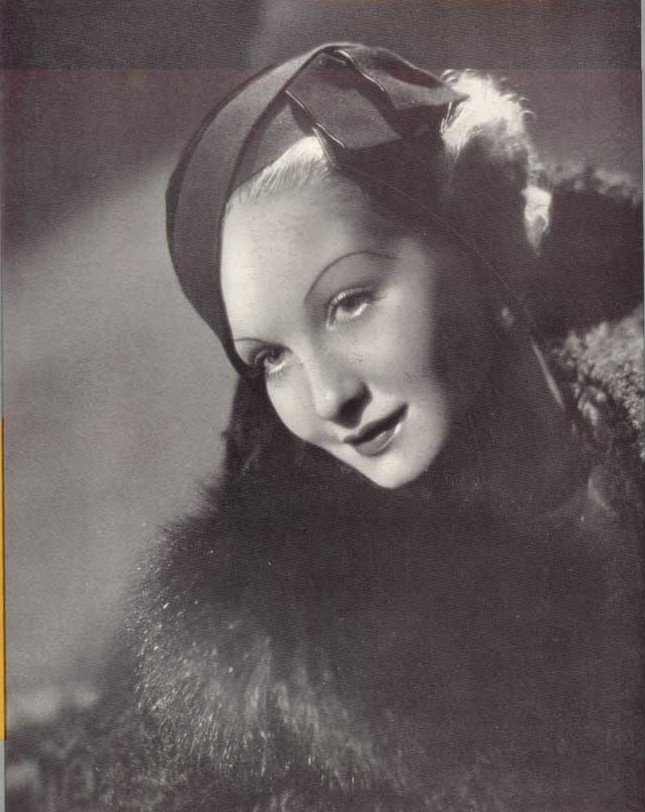
- Maritza in 1932
- Born: Dora Patricia Nathan; 17 March 1910; Tianjin, China
- Died: July 1987 (aged 77); U.S. Virgin Islands
- Occupation: Actress
- Years active: 1930–1934
- Spouse(s): Sam Katz (m. 1934-1938)
- Relatives: Matthew Nathan (uncle)

Sari Maritza (born Dora Patricia Nathan; 17 March 1910 – July 1987) was a British film actress of the early 1930s.

== Early years ==
Born in Tianjin, China as Dora Patricia Nathan, she was the daughter of Major Walter Simeon Nathan and his Austrian wife, Eveline Detring. She received her school education in England, Germany, Austria, and Switzerland . British colonial administrator Lieutenant-Colonel Sir Matthew Nathan was an uncle.

== Film ==
Sari Maritza

Maritza entered films in 1930 and gained some notoriety for dancing a tango with Charles Chaplin at the premiere for his film City Lights in 1931. She made the German-UK film Monte Carlo Madness in Germany in 1932 before traveling to Hollywood, but her few films there for Paramount Studios and RKO Radio Pictures were poorly received.

In America, she was portrayed as an exotic European vamp with emphasis placed on her mother's Austrian heritage, but Maritza had lived most of her life in Britain, and disapproved of the studio's attempts to create a more mysterious facade for her. She retired in 1934 following her marriage, and in later years, admitted that she had been eager to end her career as she did not consider herself to be a capable actress.

The Literary Digest said the name was pronounced SHA-ree MAR-ee-tsa. (Charles Earle Funk, What's the Name, Please?, Funk & Wagnalls, 1936.)

== Personal life and death ==
On October 17, 1934, Maritza married film executive Sam Katz in Phoenix, Arizona. They divorced in 1938. She died at age 77 in the U.S. Virgin Islands in July 1987.

== Filmography ==
- Greek Street (UK, 1930) as Anna
- Bed and Breakfast (UK, 1930) as Anne Entwhistle
- No Lady (UK, 1931) as Greta Gherkinski
- The Water Gipsies (UK, 1932) as Lily Bell
- Monte Carlo Madness (Germany/UK, 1932) as Queen Yola
- Forgotten Commandments (Paramount, 1932) as Anya Sorina
- Evenings for Sale (Paramount, 1932) (with Herbert Marshall, Charlie Ruggles, and Mary Boland) as Lela Fischer
- A Lady's Profession (Paramount, 1933) as Cecily Withers
- International House (Paramount, 1933) (with W. C. Fields, Bela Lugosi, George Burns, and Gracie Allen) as Carol Fortescue
- The Right to Romance (RKO, 1933) (with Ann Harding, Robert Young, and Nils Asther) as Lee Joyce
- Her Secret (1933) as Waffles
- Crimson Romance (Mascot, 1934) as Alida Hoffman (final film role)
