= Forgotten Commandments =

1932 film

- Theatrical release poster
- Directed by: Louis J. Gasnier; William Schorr
- Screenplay by: James B. Fagan; Agnes Brand Leahy
- Starring: Sari Maritza; Gene Raymond; Marguerite Churchill; Irving Pichel; Harry Beresford; Kent Taylor
- Cinematography: Karl Struss
- Music by: Herman Hand; Rudolph G. Kopp
- Production company: Paramount Pictures
- Distributed by: Paramount Pictures
- Release date: May 22, 1932
- Running time: 75 minutes
- Country: United States
- Language: English

Forgotten Commandments is a 1932 American pre-Code drama film directed by Louis J. Gasnier and William Schorr and written by James B. Fagan and Agnes Brand Leahy. The film stars Sari Maritza, Gene Raymond, Marguerite Churchill, Irving Pichel, Harry Beresford and Kent Taylor. The film was released on May 22, 1932, by Paramount Pictures.

== Overview ==
The framework story serves as a backdrop to a retelling of the Exodus tale and, more importantly, to the recycling of footage from the silent version of The Ten Commandments.

== Cast ==
- Sari Maritza as Anya Sorina
- Gene Raymond as Paul Ossipoff
- Marguerite Churchill as Marya Ossipoff
- Irving Pichel as Prof. Marinoff
- Harry Beresford as Priest
- Kent Taylor as Gregor
- Joe Sawyer as Ivan Ivanovitch Petroff
- Edward Van Sloan as Doctor
- William Barrymore as Burly Student
- Sidney Miller as Student
- John Carradine as First Orator
- Harry Cording as Officer
