= The Love Gamble =

1925 film

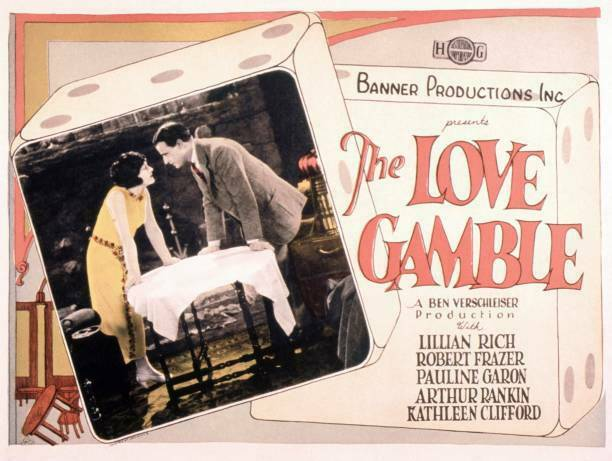
- Lobby card
- Directed by: Edward LeSaint
- Written by: Fanny Hatton; Frederic Hatton; Harry O. Hoyt
- Based on: Peggy of Beacon Hill by Maysie Greig
- Starring: Lillian Rich; Robert Frazer; Pauline Garon
- Cinematography: King D. Gray; Orin Jackson
- Production company: Banner Productions
- Distributed by: Henry Ginsberg Distributing Company; Wardour Films (UK)
- Release date: September 11, 1925
- Running time: 60 minutes
- Country: United States
- Language: Silent (English intertitles)

The Love Gamble is a 1925 American silent drama film directed by Edward LeSaint and starring Lillian Rich, Robert Frazer, and Pauline Garon.

== Cast ==
- Lillian Rich as Peggy Mason
- Robert Frazer as Douglas Wyman
- Pauline Garon as Jennie Howard
- Kathleen Clifford as Fifi Gordon
- Larry Steers as Jim Gordon
- Bonnie Hill as Mrs. Wyman
- Arthur Rankin as Jack Mason
- Brooks Benedict as Joe Wheeler
- James A. Marcus as Dan Mason

== Preservation ==
The film is preserved in 16mm at the UCLA Film and Television Archive.

== Bibliography ==
- Munden, Kenneth White. The American Film Institute Catalog of Motion Pictures Produced in the United States, Part 1. University of California Press, 1997.
