= Crimson Romance =

1934 film by David Howard

- Theatrical release poster
- Directed by: David Howard
- Screenplay by: Milton Krims; Doris Schroeder
- Story by: Al Martin; Sherman L. Lowe
- Produced by: Nat Levine
- Starring: Ben Lyon; Sari Maritza; Erich von Stroheim; James Bush; William Bakewell; Hardie Albright
- Cinematography: Ernest Miller
- Edited by: Doris Drought
- Production company: Mascot Pictures
- Distributed by: Mascot Pictures
- Release date: October 12, 1934
- Running time: 71 minutes
- Country: United States
- Language: English

Crimson Romance is a 1934 American drama film directed by David Howard and written by Milton Krims and Doris Schroeder. The film stars Ben Lyon, Sari Maritza, Erich von Stroheim, James Bush, William Bakewell and Hardie Albright. The low-budget project utilized footage from Hell's Angels (1930) and was released on October 12, 1934, by Mascot Pictures.

In the film, two civilian pilots volunteer for service with the Luftstreitkräfte during World War I. They get involved in a love triangle as they fall for a Red Cross nurse. When the American pilot's loyalty to Germany is questioned and he is forced to flee, the two pilots find themselves serving opposing forces. Their loyalty to each other is put to the test.

== Plot ==
In 1916, childhood best friends, Bob Wilson (Ben Lyon) and Fred von Bergen (James Bush), are test pilots working for an American company that builds bombers for the European allies. Since he is German-born and faces prejudice against his heritage, Fred loses his job and, unable to find other employment, decides to return to Germany to fight for his homeland. Although he has no special attachment to the German cause, Bob quits the aviation company and joins his friend in Germany.

On their way to a German airfield, Red Cross nurse Alida Hoffman (Sari Maritza) accidentally runs Bob and Fred off the road, Both men are immediately drawn to Alida, especially Bob although Fred is more shy. After Bob's first unsuccessful mission, Captain Wolters (Erich von Stroheim), the squadron's tyrannical leader, expresses his doubt about his loyalty but, desperate for pilots, gives him another chance.

As the United States is drawn into the war, instead of sending him into a crucial air battle, Wolters arrests Bob. Fred, heartbroken that Alida has chosen Bob, quarrels with his friend, calling him a coward. Later, however, Fred allows his friend to escape from a firing squad and flee to the Allied lines.

To prove his allegiance, Bob leads British bombers to the German base, while Fred is told by Wolters that he must shoot down Bob to prove his loyalty. Neither man is capable of killing the other, and, in the end, Fred sacrifices his life for Bob. After the war, Bob returns to Germany to marry Alida. The newly married couple then returns to the United States, and pay their respects to Fred's mother.

== Cast ==
- Ben Lyon as Bob Wilson
- Sari Maritza as Alida Hoffman
- Erich von Stroheim as Capt. Wolters
- James Bush as Fred von Bergen
- William Bakewell as Adolph
- Hardie Albright as Hugo
- Arthur Clayton as Baron von Eisenlohr
- Oscar Apfel as John Fleming
- Purnell Pratt as Franklyn Pierce
- Jason Robards, Sr. as Pierre
- Wilhelm von Brincken as Von Gering
- Brandon Hurst as English Officer
- Crauford Kent as English Officer
- Jameson Thomas as English Officer
- Eric Arnold as Von Muller
- Harry Schultz as Drill Sergeant
- Frederick Vogeding as German Colonel

== Production ==
Crimson Romance was a low budget production that relied on the large amount of footage that had been shot for Hell's Angels. The advantage of having Ben Lyon as the lead actor in both features allowed for intercutting between previously shot footage and new scenes that were shot at Wilson Airport in North Hollywood, California, owned by aviators Roy and Tave Wilson, the only airport that was exclusively devoted to film work. Lyon was filmed in a Royal Aircraft Factory S.E.5 that had been seen in numerous films.

Crimson Romance was only allotted a short period of time for new scenes to be shot, resulting in a frenzied production schedule. Lyon was constantly on demand for filming and complained that the production company wanted a "limousine for the price of a Model T." (Note: Due to the sunrise to sunset working hours, the crew began to call the film, the "Candlelight Service".)

One unusual scene in Crimson Romance blended together footage of Lyon in a British fighter bearing down on a German bomber. The scene showing the bomber was from Hell's Angels. Lyon was also in the German aircraft, with the improbable scenario of Lyon shooting himself down.

== Reception ==
In his review for The New York Times, Frank Nugent, struggled with the unlikely choice of the film's title and its apparent romantic story, wrote: " There is more to 'Crimson Romance' ... It is the not always believable, but generally interesting, story of two friends, one an American, the other a German, who enlist in the German air force in 1916."
