= Brandon Hurst =

English actor (1866–1947)

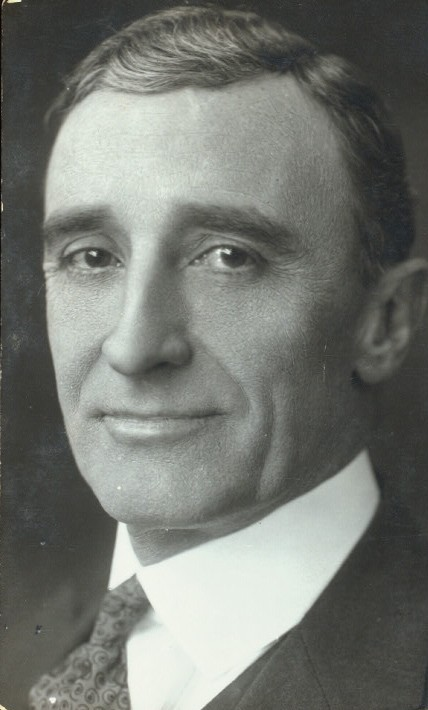
- Hurst in the 1910s
- Born: 30 November 1866; London, UK
- Died: 15 July 1947 (aged 80); Hollywood, California, U.S.
- Occupation: Actor
- Years active: 1915–1947
- Height: 6 ft 0 in (1.83 m)

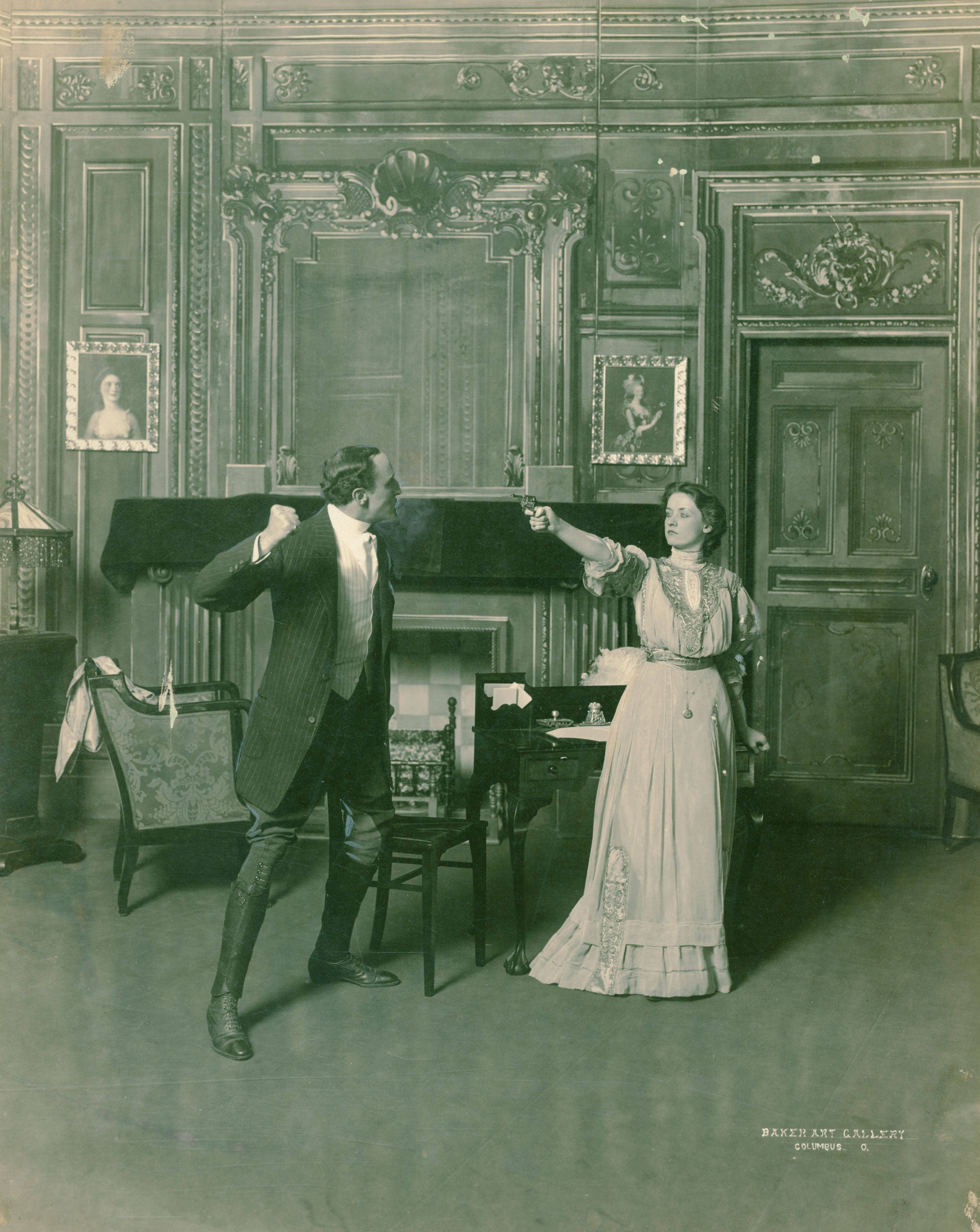
Hurst and Maude Fealy in The Stronger Sex, 1907

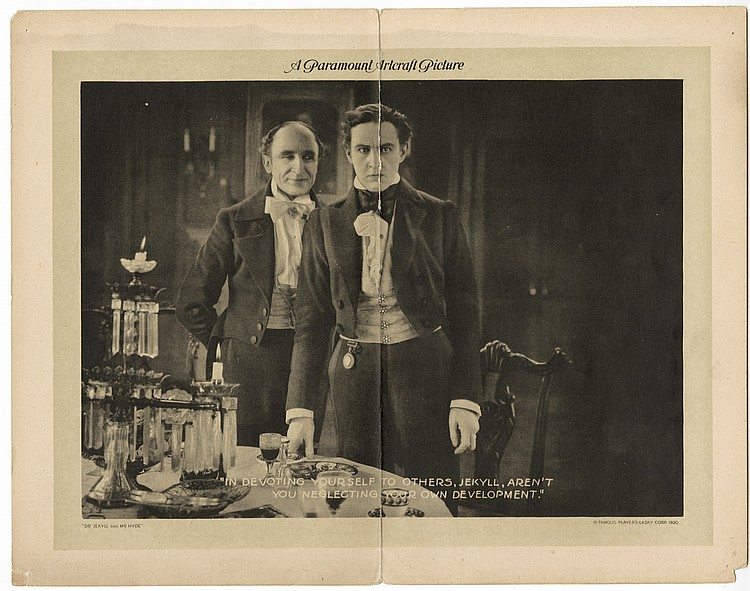
Hurst with John Barrymore Dr. Jekyll and Mr. Hyde 1920

Brandon Hurst (30 November 1866 – 15 July 1947) was an English stage and film actor.

== Early life ==
Born in London, England, Hurst studied philology in his youth and began performing in theatre in the 1880s.

Before he began acting professionally, Hurst served seven years in the British army, including five years with the King's Dragoon Guards in India.

== Career ==
He worked in Broadway shows from 1900 until his entry into motion pictures. His most notable stage appearance was Two Women in 1910, costarring Mrs. Leslie Carter and Robert Warwick.

He was nearly fifty before his film debut in Via Wireless (1915) as Edward Pinckney. He appeared in 129 other films. He became well known in the 1920s for portraying the antagonist and anti-heroes. Those roles include Sir George Carew in Dr. Jekyll and Mr. Hyde (1920), Jehan Frollo in The Hunchback of Notre Dame (1923), Alexei Karenin opposite Greta Garbo in Love (1927), and Barkilphedro in The Man Who Laughs (1928).

His roles in sound films during the 1920s and 1930s were often small. One of his more important roles was the sinister Merlin the Magician in Fox's A Connecticut Yankee (1931). Hurst worked as an actor until his death, his last film was Two Guys from Texas (1948).

== Filmography ==
- Via Wireless (1915) - Edward Pinckney (film debut)
- Dr. Jekyll and Mr. Hyde (1920) - Sir George Carew
- A Dark Lantern (1920) - Colonel Dereham
- The World's Applause (1923) - James Crane
- Legally Dead (1923) - Dr. Gelzer
- The Hunchback of Notre Dame (1923) - Jehan Frollo
- The Thief of Bagdad (1924) - The Caliph
- Cytherea (1924) - Daniel Randon
- One Night in Rome (1924) - Count Beetholde
- The Silent Watcher (1924) - Herrold, the reporter
- He Who Gets Slapped (1924) - Clown (uncredited)
- The Lover of Camille (1924) - Bertrand
- The Lady (1925) - St. Aubyns Sr
- Lightnin' (1925) - Everett Hammond
- The Enchanted Hill (1926) - Jasper Doak
- Made for Love (1926) - Pharaoh
- The Grand Duchess and the Waiter (1926) - Matard - Hotel Manager
- Secret Orders (1926) - Butler
- Paris at Midnight (1926) - Count Tarrefer
- The Shamrock Handicap (1926) - The Procurer of Taxes (uncredited)
- The Rainmaker (1926) - Doyle
- Volcano! (1926) - André de Chauvalons
- The Amateur Gentleman (1926) - Peterby
- The Lady of the Harem (1926) - Beggar
- The King of Kings (1927) (uncredited)
- 7th Heaven (1927) - Uncle George (uncredited)
- Annie Laurie (1927) - The Campbell Chieftain
- The High School Hero (1927) - Mr. Golden
- Love (1927) - Karenin
- The Man Who Laughs (1928) - Barkilphedro
- News Parade (1928) - A.K. Wellington
- Interference (1928) - Inspector Haynes
- The Voice of the Storm (1929) - Dr. Isaacs
- The Wolf of Wall Street (1929) - Sturgess
- The Greene Murder Case (1929) - Sproot
- Her Private Life (1929) - Sir Emmett Wildering
- High Society Blues (1930) - Jowles
- The Eyes of the World (1930) - Mr. Taine
- The Right of Way (1931) - Crown Attorney
- A Connecticut Yankee (1931) - Merlin/Doctor in Mansion
- Young as You Feel (1931) - Robbins
- Murder at Midnight (1931) - Lawrence
- Murders in the Rue Morgue (1932) - Prefect of Police
- Scarface (1932) - Citizens Committee Member (uncredited)
- The Midnight Lady (1932) - District Attorney
- White Zombie (1932) - Silver
- Down to Earth (1932) - Jeffrey, the Butler
- Sherlock Holmes (1932) - Secretary to Erskine (uncredited)
- Rasputin and the Empress (1932) - Staff General (uncredited)
- Cavalcade (1933) - Gilbert & Sullivan Actor (uncredited)
- I Love That Man (1933) - Banker Burkhart (uncredited)
- Bombay Mail (1934) - Pundit Garnath Chundra
- The Lost Patrol (1934) - Bell
- The House of Rothschild (1934) - Stock Trader
- House of Mystery (1934) - Hindu Priest
- Viva Villa! (1934) - Statesman (uncredited)
- Have a Heart (1934) - Bramley, Consulting Doctor (uncredited)
- Crimson Romance (1934) - English Officer
- Red Morning (1934) - Island Magistrate
- Bright Eyes (1934) - Higgins
- The Little Minister (1934) - Anders Strothers (uncredited)
- The Woman in Red (1935) - Uncle Emlen Wyatt
- While the Patient Slept (1935) - Grondal
- Bonnie Scotland (1935) - Military Policeman (uncredited)
- Annie Oakley (1935) - Doctor Treating Toby (uncredited)
- The Great Impersonation (1935) - Middleton
- A Tale of Two Cities (1935) - Minor Role (uncredited)
- The Moon's Our Home (1936) - Babson
- Mary of Scotland (1936) - Airan
- The Charge of the Light Brigade (1936) - Lord Raglan (uncredited)
- The Plough and the Stars (1936) - Sergeant Tinley
- Stolen Holiday (1937) - Police Detective (uncredited)
- Maid of Salem (1937) - Tithing Man
- Maytime (1937) - Master of Ceremonies (uncredited)
- Wee Willie Winkie (1937) - Bagby
- The Firefly (1937) - English General (uncredited)
- Four Men and a Prayer (1938) - Jury Foreman (uncredited)
- Kidnapped (1938) - Doomster
- Professor Beware (1938) - Charlile - Butler (uncredited)
- If I Were King (1938) - Beggar (uncredited)
- Suez (1938) - Franz Liszt
- East Side of Heaven (1939) - Butler (uncredited)
- Tell No Tales (1939) - Lovelake's Butler (uncredited)
- The Sun Never Sets (1939) - Doctor (uncredited)
- Stanley and Livingstone (1939) - Sir Henry Forrester
- It's a Wonderful World (1939) - Paul Henry
- The Blue Bird (1940) - Footman
- If I Had My Way (1940) - Hedges (uncredited)
- Rhythm on the River (1940) - Bates (uncredited)
- The Howards of Virginia (1940) - Wilton (uncredited)
- Sign of the Wolf (1941) - Dr. Morton
- Charley's Aunt (1941) - Coach (uncredited)
- Dr. Jekyll and Mr. Hyde (1941) - Briggs, Lanyon's Butler (uncredited)
- Birth of the Blues (1941) - Headwaiter in Cafe (uncredited)
- Road to Happiness (1941) - Swayne
- The Remarkable Andrew (1942) - Mr. Chief Justice John Marshall
- The Ghost of Frankenstein (1942) - Hans (uncredited)
- The Mad Martindales (1942) - Smythe Butler
- The Pied Piper (1942) - Major Domo (uncredited)
- Road to Morocco (1942) - English Announcer (uncredited)
- Tennessee Johnson (1942) - Senator (uncredited)
- The Leopard Man (1943) - Cemetery Gatekeeper (uncredited)
- The Constant Nymph (1943) - Minor Role (uncredited)
- Dixie (1943) - Dignified Man in Audience
- The Man from Down Under (1943) - Government Official at Train Station (uncredited)
- Thank Your Lucky Stars (1943) - Cab Driver in 'Good Night, Good Neighbor' Number (uncredited)
- Jane Eyre (1943) - Lowood School Trustee (uncredited)
- Shine On, Harvest Moon (1944) - Watchman (uncredited)
- Radio Bugs (1944, Short) - Shakespearean Actor (uncredited)
- The Adventures of Mark Twain (1944) - Ralph Waldo Emerson (uncredited)
- The Canterville Ghost (1944) - Mr. Peabody (uncredited)
- Mrs. Parkington (1944) - Footman (uncredited)
- The Princess and the Pirate (1944) - Mr. Pelly
- House of Frankenstein (1944) - Dr. Geissler
- The Man in Half Moon Street (1945) - Simpson—Butler
- The Corn Is Green (1945) - Lewellyn Powell (uncredited)
- The Great John L. (1945) - Prince of Wales' Valet (uncredited)
- The Spanish Main (1945) - The Sea Lawyer (uncredited)
- Confidential Agent (1945) - Man on Train (uncredited)
- Road to Utopia (1945) - Man at Zambini's (uncredited)
- San Antonio (1945) - Gambler (uncredited)
- The Green Years (1946) - Bookseller (uncredited)
- Monsieur Beaucaire (1946) - Marquis (uncredited)
- Sister Kenny (1946) - Mr. Todd - Landlord (uncredited)
- Magnificent Doll (1946) - Brown (uncredited)
- The Time, the Place and the Girl (1946) - Simpkins - the Cassel's Butler (uncredited)
- My Favorite Brunette (1947) - Butler (uncredited)
- Welcome Stranger (1947) - Townsman (uncredited)
- Where There's Life (1947) - Floor Walker (uncredited)
- My Wild Irish Rose (1947) - Michael the Gardener (uncredited)
- Road to Rio (1947) - Barker (uncredited)
- Two Guys from Texas (1948) - Judge (final film) (uncredited)
