= The Tragedy of Youth =

1928 silent drama film

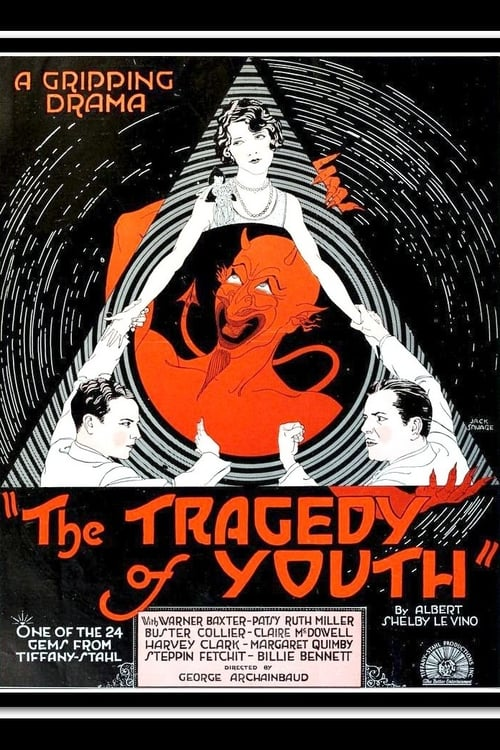
- Directed by: George Archainbaud
- Written by: Fanny Hatton; Frederic Hatton; Olga Printzlau
- Story by: Albert S. Le Vino
- Produced by: John M. Stahl
- Starring: Patsy Ruth Miller; Warner Baxter; William Collier Jr.
- Cinematography: Faxon M. Dean
- Edited by: Robert Kern
- Production company: Tiffany Pictures
- Distributed by: Tiffany Pictures
- Release date: March 1, 1928
- Running time: 70 minutes
- Country: United States
- Language: Silent (English intertitles)

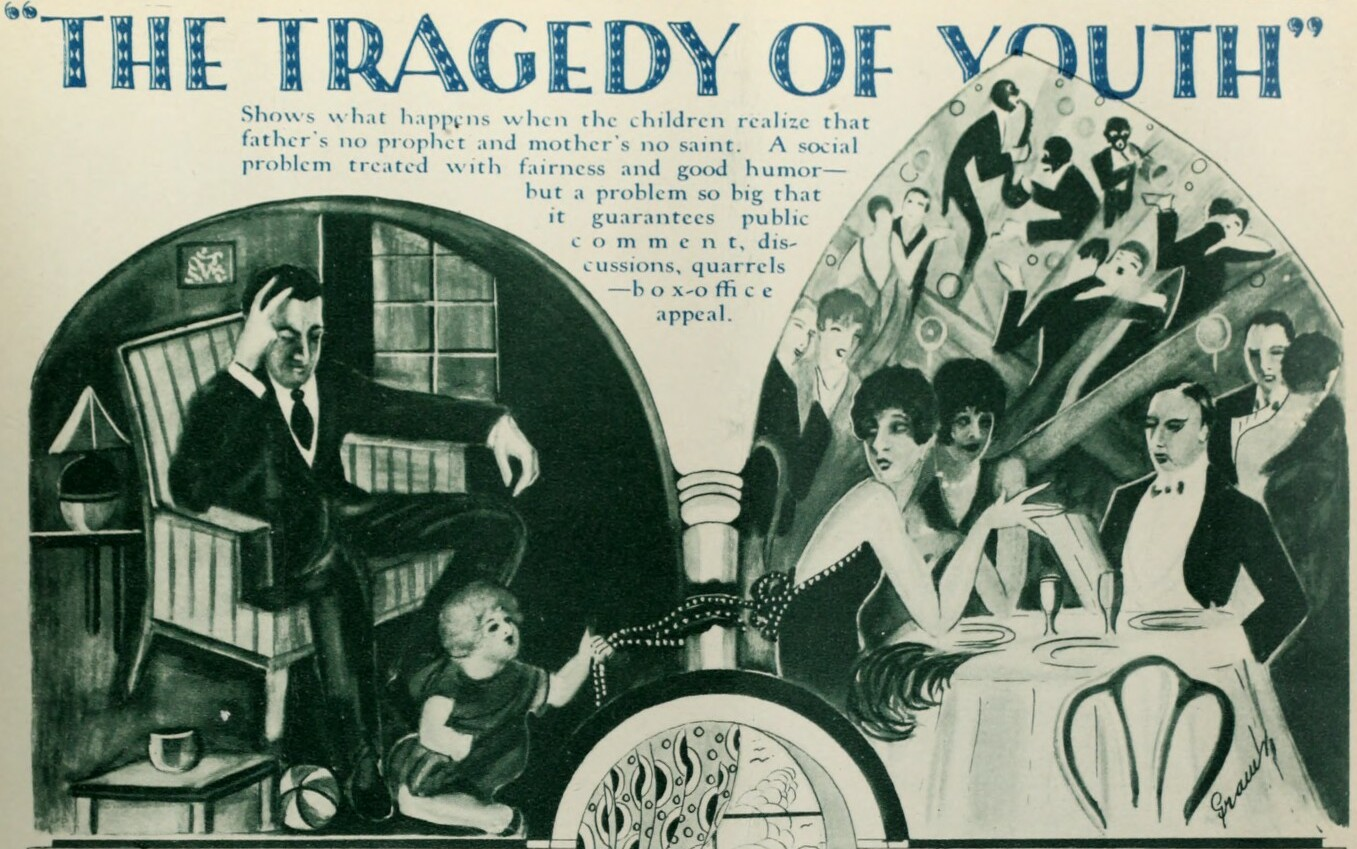
The Tragedy of Youth advertisement in The Film Daily on July 18, 1927

The Tragedy of Youth is a 1928 American silent drama film directed by George Archainbaud and starring Patsy Ruth Miller, Warner Baxter and William Collier Jr. It was produced and released by Tiffany Pictures, one of the largest independent studios in Hollywood during the era.

== Synopsis ==
A newlywed wife feels neglected by her husband and turns to another man for consolation.

== Cast ==
- Patsy Ruth Miller as Paula Wayne
- Warner Baxter as Frank Gordon
- William Collier Jr. as Dick Wayne
- Claire McDowell as Mother
- Harvey Clark as Father
- Margaret Quimby as Diana
- Billie Bennett as Landlady
- Stepin Fetchit as Porter

== Preservation ==
With no prints of The Tragedy of Youth located in any film archives, it is a lost film.

== Bibliography ==
- Munden, Kenneth White. The American Film Institute Catalog of Motion Pictures Produced in the United States, Part 1. University of California Press, 1997.
