= The Desired Woman =

1927 film by Michael Curtiz

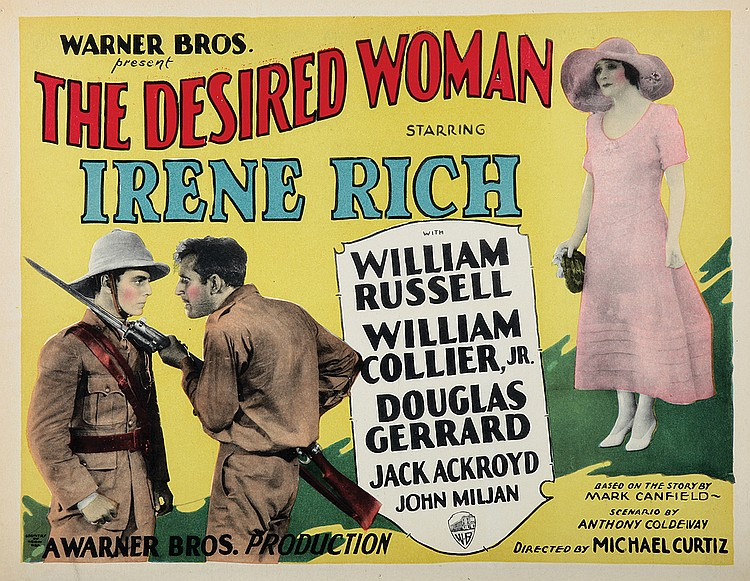
- Directed by: Michael Curtiz
- Written by: Anthony Coldeway
- Story by: Darryl F. Zanuck
- Starring: Irene Rich; William Russell; William Collier Jr.
- Cinematography: Conrad Wells
- Production company: Warner Bros.
- Distributed by: Warner Bros.
- Release date: August 27, 1927
- Running time: 70 minutes
- Country: United States
- Languages: Sound (Synchronized) (English Intertitles)

The Desired Woman is a 1927 American synchronized sound drama film directed by Michael Curtiz and starring Irene Rich, William Russell and William Collier Jr. While the film has no audible dialog, it was released with a synchronized musical score with sound effects using the Vitaphone sound-on-disc process. It is now considered to be lost. It was produced and distributed by Warner Bros. The film was based on a story by Darryl F. Zanuck, who was credited under the pseudonym Mark Canfield.

== Plot ==
Lady Diana Whitney, at woman of the English aristocracy, has her pick of suitors—but she ignores the calm, steadfast love of Sir Sydney Vincent of the Foreign Office and instead chooses passion. Her heart is captured by the magnetism of Captain Maxwell, a hard-bitten cavalry officer of the British Army, whose brawny charm sweep her into marriage.

At first, Diana is enthralled by the physical dominance of her husband. But once transferred to a remote British outpost in the scorching Indian desert, she finds the endless monotony and her husband's unrelenting rigidity stifling. Captain Maxwell, a soldier to the bone, proves far better suited to the saddle than the salon. The desert's barrenness soon mirrors the growing void in Diana's heart.

Then arrives Lieutenant Larry Trent, a young, spirited officer whose presence reawakens Diana's joy. His laughter and warmth remind her of England's drawing rooms and dancing halls. Though Larry is enamored with her, Diana maintains her dignity, rebuffing his romantic advances. But her fondness does not go unnoticed by Captain Maxwell, who—possessed by jealousy—sends Larry on a dangerous solo reconnaissance mission to a hostile village.

Maxwell's vengeance does not end there. When Lieutenant Kellogg, another admirer of Diana, shows his affections too freely, the Captain punishes him with a brutal desert foot patrol—effectively a death sentence. In the shimmering haze of the dunes, Larry stumbles upon the delirious Kellogg, burned by sun and driven mad by heat. In an act of duty and compassion, Larry hauls the broken officer back to the fort.

Soon after, word arrives of a native uprising, and Captain Maxwell marches with his garrison to quell the revolt. Diana, left behind with Larry and the now-insane Kellogg, begs the young officer to flee while he still can. The Captain will stop at nothing, she says, and his next blow may be fatal. Larry implores Diana to leave with him and return to England—to a life of comfort, civility, and love.

Caught in the throes of temptation and emotional confusion, Diana agrees. But their escape is interrupted by a sudden and merciless sandstorm. Huddled together beneath the fury of the desert winds, Diana's conscience awakens. Her sense of honor and Larry's future are at stake. When the storm clears, she insists they return to the fort—chastened, but with integrity intact.

Their secret return is witnessed by Kellogg, whose madness has metastasized into dangerous delusion. Burning with jealous rage, he confronts Larry and threatens to expose the pair's night away. A scuffle breaks out. In a frenzied burst, Kellogg lunges with a bayonet. Larry, forced to defend himself, draws his revolver and fires. Kellogg is killed.

At the subsequent court martial, Larry is tried for manslaughter and sentenced to ten years in prison. Bound by his promise to Diana, he refuses to explain the true circumstances behind the fatal encounter. Diana, heartbroken and burdened with guilt, swears to keep their secret.

Desperate to save the man she truly loves, Diana returns to London and marries Sir Sydney Vincent—the very man she once refused. Through his influence, Sir Sydney secures Larry's pardon. Larry, unaware of Diana's sacrifice, visits to express his thanks. There, he learns the truth: that it was Diana's intervention that won his freedom, and that she is now divorced from Maxwell, living in peace as Lady Vincent.

Meanwhile, far across the sands, Captain Maxwell remains. Hardened by heat and solitude, he rides still—grim, relentless, his eyes dimmed by a haunted light. He has lost the only woman he ever desired and never understood.

== Cast ==
- Irene Rich as Diana Maxwell
- William Russell as Captain Maxwell
- William Collier Jr. as Lieutenant Larry Trent
- Douglas Gerrard as Fitzroy
- Jack Ackroyd as Henery
- John Miljan as Lieutenant Kellogg
- Richard Tucker as Sir Sydney Vincent

== See also ==
- List of early Warner Bros. sound and talking features

== Bibliography ==
- Rode, Alan K. Michael Curtiz: A Life in Film. University Press of Kentucky, 2017.
