= The Floating College =

1928 film

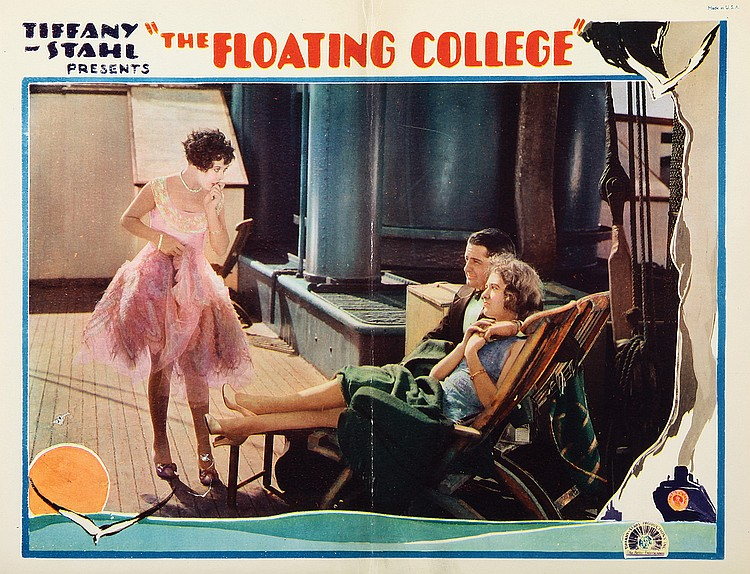
- Directed by: George Crone
- Written by: Stuart Anthony; Paul Perez
- Produced by: John M. Stahl
- Starring: Sally O'Neil; William Collier Jr.; Georgia Hale
- Cinematography: Harry Jackson
- Edited by: Desmond O'Brien
- Production company: Tiffany Pictures
- Distributed by: Tiffany Pictures
- Release date: November 10, 1928
- Running time: 60 minutes
- Country: United States
- Languages: Silent; English intertitles

The Floating College is a 1928 American silent comedy film directed by George Crone and starring Sally O'Neil, William Collier Jr., and Georgia Hale.

== Plot ==
Two sisters fall in love with a swimming instructor.

== Cast ==
- Sally O'Neil as Pat Bixby
- William Collier Jr. as George Dewey
- Georgia Hale as Frances Bixby
- Harvey Clark as The Dean
- George Harris as Snug
- E.J. Ratcliffe as Nathan Bixby
- Virginia Sale as Miss Cobbs

== Censorship ==
When The Floating College was released, many states and cities in the United States had censor boards that could require cuts or other eliminations before the film could be shown. Consistent with prohibition, the Kansas censor board ordered the elimination of a scene showing a travelling bag with liquor running out.
