= The Rainmaker (1926 film) =

1926 film

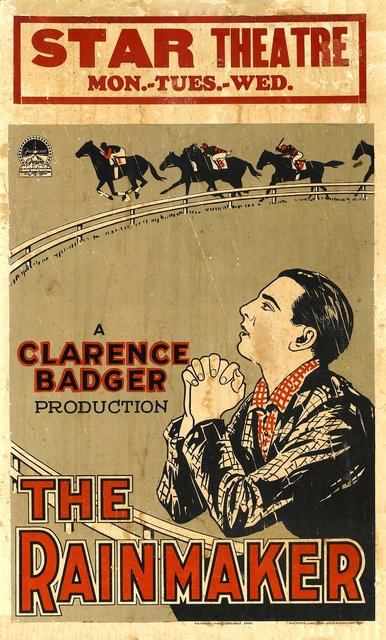
- Film poster
- Directed by: Clarence G. Badger
- Screenplay by: Louis D. Lighton; Hope Loring
- Based on: Heavenbent; 1925 story in Red Book Magazine by Gerald Beaumont
- Produced by: Jesse L. Lasky; Adolph Zukor
- Starring: William Collier Jr. Georgia Hale; Ernest Torrence; Brandon Hurst
- Cinematography: H. Kinley Martin
- Production company: Famous Players–Lasky Corporation
- Distributed by: Paramount Pictures
- Release date: May 10, 1926
- Running time: 50 minutes
- Country: United States
- Language: Silent (English intertitles)

The Rainmaker is a 1926 American silent drama film directed by Clarence G. Badger and written by Gerald Beaumont, Louis D. Lighton, and Hope Loring. The film stars William Collier Jr., Georgia Hale, Ernest Torrence, Brandon Hurst, Joseph J. Dowling, and Tom Wilson. The film was released on May 10, 1926, by Paramount Pictures.

== Plot ==
As described in a film magazine review, due to an injury received during the war, a jockey is told he will never ride again. However, the injury also allows him to know through prayer whether it will rain, the knowledge useful in his betting on horse races. His nurse Nell Wendell falls in love with him, but she is later discharged from the hospital. She becomes a dancer in a saloon owned by a lifetime friend, who has refused to sell his property to a rival who believes that there is oil on the land. A plague breaks out and the rival prevents aid from coming in. The jockey prays for rain with the aid of the parish priest and it comes. Nell's friend in his will leaves his property to the couple.

== Cast ==
- William Collier Jr. as Bobby Robertson
- Georgia Hale as Nell Wendell
- Ernest Torrence as Mike
- Brandon Hurst as Doyle
- Joseph J. Dowling as Father Murphy
- Tom Wilson as Chocolate
- Martha Mattox as Head Nurse
- Charles K. French as Hospital Doctor
- Jack Richardson as Western Doctor
- Melbourne MacDowell as Bennson

== Preservation ==
With no prints of The Rainmaker located in any film archives, it is a lost film.
