= Speed Demon (1932 film) =

1932 film

- Film poster
- Directed by: D. Ross Lederman
- Written by: Charles R. Condon
- Starring: William Collier Jr.
- Distributed by: Columbia Pictures
- Release date: November 11, 1932
- Running time: 69 minutes
- Country: United States
- Language: English

Speed Demon is a 1932 American Pre-Code drama film directed by D. Ross Lederman and starring William Collier Jr. It is now believed to be a lost film.

== Plot ==
Boat builder Captain Torrance, his daughter Jean, and mechanic 'Speed' Morrow build a racing boat which performs well in trials while piloted by Morrow, who wants to be a racer. The boat's speed and Morrow's skill attract the attention of racketeers Langard and Lefty, who have been hired by a rival manufacturer to ensure his boat wins a racing championship.

On the day of the race Langard and Lefty buy Morrow a couple of drinks and then try to get him to throw the race, but he refuses. During the race, however, Pete Stenner (in the rival's boat) uses an underhanded trick to maneuver Morrow into crashing into another boat, killing its driver. Morrow is blamed for the collision and accused of being drunk during the race, and the Torrances fire him.

Morrow heads to South America in disgrace, but on the boat there he befriends 10-year-old stowaway Catfish Jones. Needing money, Morrow begins working for Langard smuggling liquor. Morrow's friendship with Jones convinces Jean to give Morrow a second chance in another race.

After failing to convince Morrow to withdraw from the race, Langard kidnaps Jones. Morrow's search for Jones causes him to miss the start of the race, forcing Jean to begin the race instead. Morrow substitutes for Jean after the first lap and catches up with Stenner, who is in the lead. Stenner tries another dirty trick but this time Morrow is expecting it, and Stenner instead crashes his boat into a buoy and dies when the boat explodes. Morrow wins the race and rescues Jones from Langard's yacht, the Torrances sell their boat design for a great deal of money, and Morrow marries Jean.

== Cast ==
- William Collier Jr. as "Speed" Morrow
- Joan Marsh as Jean Torrance
- Wheeler Oakman as Pete Stenner
- Robert Ellis as Langard
- George Ernest as "Catfish" Jones
- Frank Sheridan as Captain Torrance
- Wade Boteler as Runyan
- Edward LeSaint as Judge (credited as Edward J. LeSaint)
- Fuzzy Knight as "Lefty"
- Ethan Laidlaw as "Red"
- Harry Tenbrook as "Bull"
