= A Woman Against the World =

1928 film

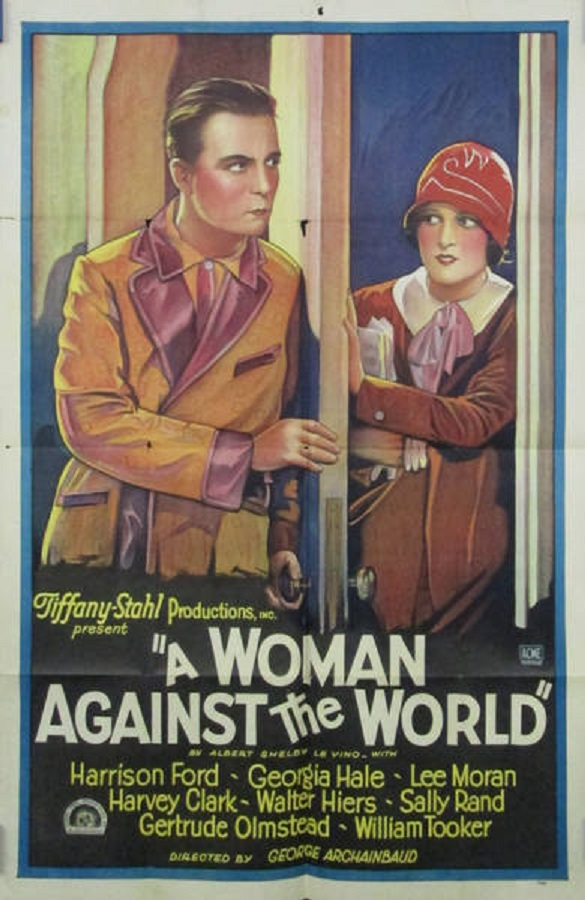
- Poster
- Directed by: George Archainbaud
- Written by: Fanny Hatton; Frederic Hatton; Gertrude Orr
- Story by: Albert S. Le Vino
- Produced by: John M. Stahl
- Starring: Harrison Ford; Georgia Hale; Lee Moran
- Cinematography: Chester A. Lyons (*French)
- Edited by: Desmond O'Brien
- Production company: Tiffany Pictures
- Distributed by: Tiffany Pictures
- Release date: January 1, 1928
- Running time: 60 minutes
- Country: United States
- Language: Silent (English intertitles)

A Woman Against the World is a lost 1928 American drama film directed by George Archainbaud and starring Harrison Ford, Georgia Hale, and Lee Moran.

== Cast ==
- Harrison Ford as Schuyler Van Loan
- Georgia Hale as Carol Hill
- Lee Moran as Bob Yates
- Harvey Clark as City Editor
- Walter Hiers as Reporter
- Gertrude Olmstead as Bernice Crane, Bride
- William H. Tooker as Mortimer Crane, Bride's Father
- Ida Darling as Mrs. Crane, Bride's Mother
- Wade Boteler as Jim Barnes, Chauffeur
- Charles Clary as Warden
- Sally Rand as Maysie Bell
- Rosemary Theby as Housekeeper
- Jim Farley as Detective

== Bibliography ==
- Gates, Phillipa. Detecting Women: Gender and the Hollywood Detective Film. SUNY Press, 2011.
