= The Gold Rush =

1925 Charles Chaplin film

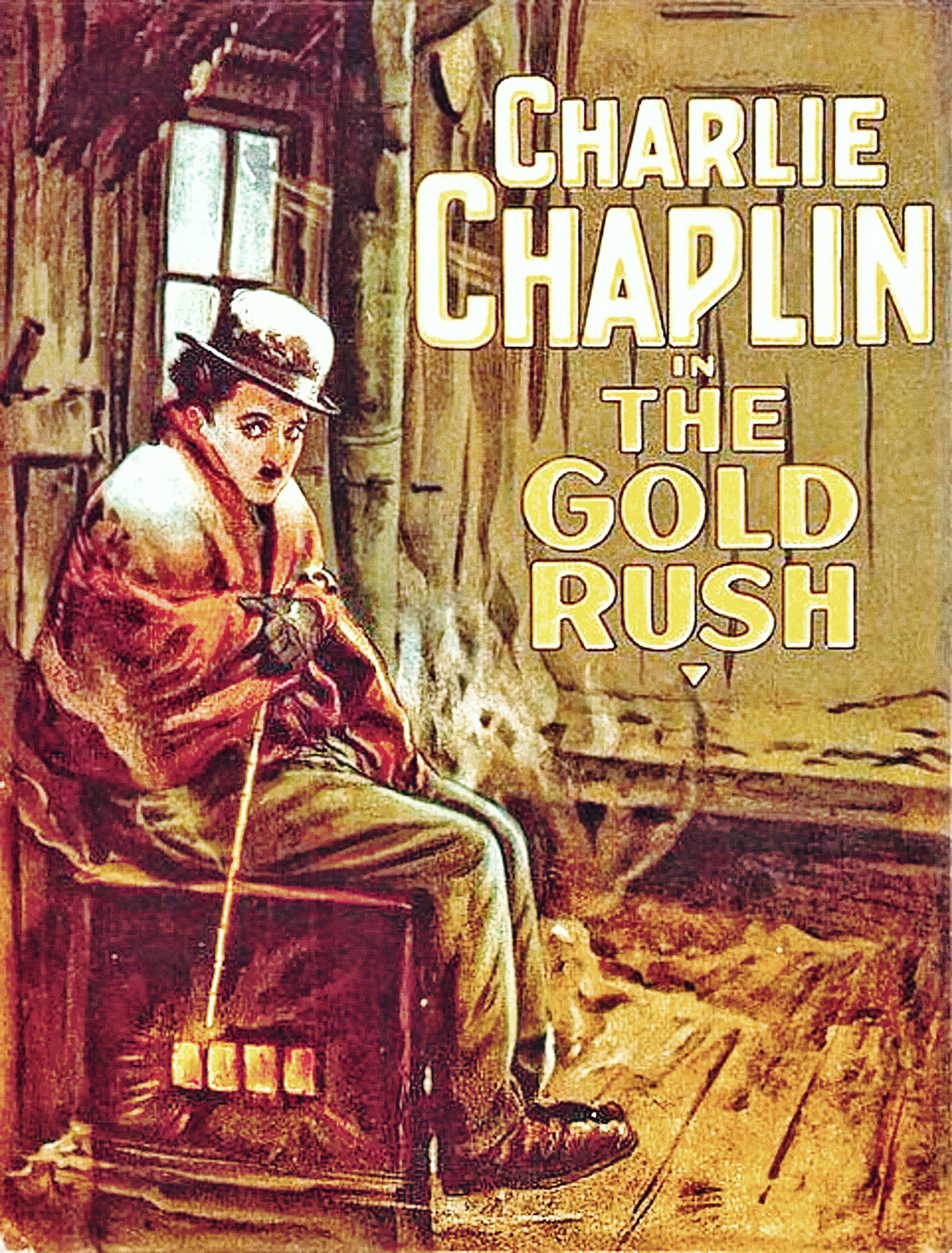
- Theatrical release poster
- Directed by: Charlie Chaplin
- Written by: Charlie Chaplin
- Produced by: Charlie Chaplin
- Starring: Charlie Chaplin; Georgia Hale; Mack Swain; Tom Murray; Malcolm Waite
- Cinematography: Roland Totheroh
- Edited by: Charlie Chaplin
- Music by: (1942 re-release): Charlie Chaplin; Carli Elinor; Max Terr; James L. Fields
- Distributed by: United Artists
- Release date: June 26, 1925
- Running time: 95 minutes (original); 72 minutes (24 fps, 1942 re-release)
- Country: United States
- Languages: Silent film English intertitles
- Budget: $923,000
- Box office: $2.15 million (U.S. and Canada rentals); $4 million (worldwide)

The Gold Rush is a 1925 American silent comedy film written, produced, and directed by Charlie Chaplin. The film also stars Chaplin in his Little Tramp persona, Georgia Hale, Mack Swain, Tom Murray, Henry Bergman and Malcolm Waite.

Chaplin drew inspiration from photographs of the Klondike Gold Rush as well as from the story of the Donner Party who, when snowbound in the Sierra Nevada, were driven to cannibalism or eating leather from their shoes. Chaplin, who believed tragedies and comedies were not far from each other, decided to combine these stories of deprivation and horror in comedy. He decided that his famous rogue figure should become a gold-digger who joins a brave optimist determined to face all the pitfalls associated with the search for gold, such as sickness, hunger, cold, loneliness or the possibility that he may at any time be attacked by a grizzly. The film features scenes like Chaplin cooking and eating his shoe, or how his starving friend Big Jim sees him as a chicken.

The Gold Rush was critically acclaimed upon its release, and continues to be one of Chaplin's most celebrated works; Chaplin himself cited it several times as the film for which he most wanted to be remembered.

In 1942, Chaplin re-released a version with sound effects, music, and narration, which received Academy Award nominations for Best Music Score and Best Sound Recording. In 1958, the film was voted number 2 on the prestigious Brussels 12 list at the 1958 World Expo, by a margin of only five votes behind Battleship Potemkin. In 1992, the film was selected for preservation in the United States National Film Registry by the Library of Congress as being "culturally, historically, or aesthetically significant".

In 1953, the original 1925 version of the film entered the public domain in the United States because the claimants did not renew its copyright registration in the 28th year after publication.

== Plot ==
The following is the plot of the 1942 re-release:

During the Klondike Gold Rush, in Alaska, gold prospector Big Jim finds an enormous gold deposit on his parcel of land when a blizzard strikes. The Lone Prospector gets lost in the same blizzard while also prospecting for gold. He stumbles into the cabin of Black Larsen, a wanted criminal. Larsen tries to throw the Prospector out when Jim also stumbles inside. Larsen tries to scare both out using his shotgun but is overpowered by Jim, and the three agree to a truce allowing them all to stay in the cabin.

When the storm lasts so long that food is running out, the three draw lots for who will have to go out into the blizzard to obtain food. Larsen loses and leaves the cabin. While outside looking for food, he encounters Jim's gold deposit and decides to ambush him there when Jim returns.

Meanwhile, the two remaining in the cabin get so desperate that they cook and eat one of the Prospector's shoes. Later, Jim gets delirious, imagines the Prospector as a giant chicken, and attacks him. A bear then enters the cabin and is killed, supplying them with food.

The Gold Rush 1925 (full movie, public domain)

After the storm subsides, both leave the cabin, the Prospector continuing on to the next gold boom town while Jim returns to his gold deposit. There, he is knocked out by Larsen with a shovel. While fleeing with some of the mined gold, Larsen dies in an avalanche. Jim recovers consciousness and wanders into the snow, having lost his memory from the blow. When he returns to the town, his memory has been partly restored and he remembers that he found a large gold deposit, that it was close to a cabin, and that he stayed there with the Prospector. But he knows neither the location of the deposit nor of the cabin, and so looks for the Prospector, hoping that he can lead him to the cabin.

The Prospector arrives at the town and encounters Georgia, a dance hall girl, and falls in love with her. To irritate Jack, a man who is making aggressive advances toward Georgia and is pestering her for a dance, she instead decides to dance with "the most deplorable looking tramp in the dance hall", the Prospector. After encountering each other again, she accepts his invitation for a New Year's Eve dinner, but does not take it seriously and forgets about it. On New Year's Eve, while waiting for her to arrive to the dinner, the Prospector imagines entertaining her with a dance of bread rolls on forks. When she does not arrive by midnight, he listens out his front door and hears the community singing Auld Lang Syne down at the dance hall. He walks alone through the streets, lonely and forgotten. Meanwhile, Georgia remembers his invitation and brings her friends to visit him. Finding his home empty but seeing the meticulously prepared dinner and a present for her, she is guilt-ridden and decides to stop toying with him. She writes him a note apologizing. When he receives the note he goes looking for her.

Jim finds him and drags him away to go search for the cabin, giving the Prospector only enough time to tell Georgia that he will return to her as a millionaire. Jim and the Prospector find the cabin and stay for the night. Overnight, another blizzard blows the cabin half over a cliff right next to Jim's gold deposit. The next morning, the cabin is rocking dangerously over the cliff edge while the two try to escape. Jim eventually gets out and pulls the Prospector to safety right when the cabin falls off the cliff.

One year later, both had become wealthy, but the Prospector never could find Georgia. They return to the contiguous United States on a ship on which, unknown to them, Georgia is also traveling. When the Prospector agrees to don his old clothes for a photograph, he falls down the stairs, encountering Georgia once more. After she mistakenly thinks he is a stowaway and tries to save him from the ship's crew, the misunderstanding is cleared up, and both are happily reunited.

== Cast ==
- Charlie Chaplin (as The Tramp) as The Lone Prospector
- Mack Swain as Jim "Big Jim" McKay
- Tom Murray as "Black" Larsen
- Malcolm Waite as Jack Cameron
- Georgia Hale as The Girl, Georgia
- Henry Bergman as Hank Curtis
- Tiny Sandford as a barman (uncredited)
- Sam Allen as man in dance hall (uncredited)
- Steve Murphy as man in dance hall

== Production ==
Chaplin attempted to film many of the scenes on location near Truckee, California in early 1924. He retained only the film's opening scene. For two weeks, the unit shot on location at Truckee in the snow country of the Sierra Nevada. Here Chaplin faithfully recreated the historic image of the prospectors struggling up the Chilkoot Pass. Six hundred extras clambered up the 2300-feet pass dug through the mountain snow.

The rest of the film was shot on the back lot and stages at Chaplin's Hollywood studio, where elaborate Klondike sets were constructed.

Lita Grey, whom Chaplin married in November 1924, was originally cast as the leading lady but due to her pregnancy was replaced by Georgia Hale. Grey appeared in the film as an extra.

Discussing the making of the film in the documentary series Unknown Chaplin, Hale revealed that the marriage had collapsed during production of the film; the final scene of the original version, in which the two kiss, reflected the state of his relationship with Hale by that time.

== Box office ==
The Gold Rush was a huge success in the US and worldwide. It is the fifth-highest-grossing silent film in cinema history, earning more than $4,250,000 at the box office in 1926 (~$61.8 million in 2025). Chaplin proclaimed at the time of its release that this was the film for which he wanted to be remembered.

It earned United Artists $1 million and Chaplin himself a profit of $2 million.

== Critical reception ==
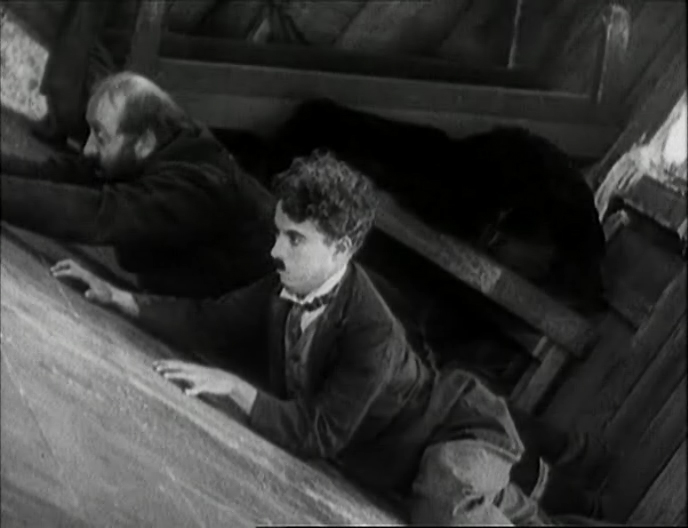
Big Jim and the Lone Prospector in the teetering cabin

Critics generally praised the original 1925 release of The Gold Rush. Mordaunt Hall wrote in The New York Times:

Here is a comedy with streaks of poetry, pathos, tenderness, linked with brusqueness and boisterousness. It is the outstanding gem of all Chaplin's pictures, as it has more thought and originality than even such masterpieces of mirth as The Kid and Shoulder Arms.

Variety also published a rave review, saying that it was "the greatest and most elaborate comedy ever filmed, and will stand for years as the biggest hit in its field, just as The Birth of a Nation still withstands the many competitors in the dramatic class."

The New Yorker published a mixed review, believing that the dramatic elements of the film did not work well alongside Chaplin's familiar slapstick:

One might be given to expect wonders of Gold Rush burlesque with the old Chaplin at the receiving end of the Klondike equivalent of custard. But one is doomed to disappoint, for Chaplin has seen fit to turn on his onion juices in a Pierrot's endeavor to draw your tears.... Instead of the rush of tears called for, one reaches for his glycerine bottle.... We do not wish to deride Chaplin. He is as deft as ever and far and away a brilliant screen master. He has made a serviceable picture in The Gold Rush but it seems that he is not as funny as he once was.

Nevertheless, The New Yorker included The Gold Rush in its year-end list of the ten best films of 1925.

At the 1958 Brussels World Fair, critics rated it the second greatest film in history, behind only Sergei Eisenstein's Battleship Potemkin. In 1992, The Gold Rush was selected for preservation in the United States National Film Registry by the Library of Congress as being "culturally, historically, or aesthetically significant".

Chaplin biographer Jeffrey Vance considers The Gold Rush to be Chaplin's greatest work of the silent-film era. He writes: "The Gold Rush is arguably his greatest and most ambitious silent film; it was the longest and most expensive comedy produced up to that time. The film contains many of Chaplin's most celebrated comedy sequences, including the boiling and eating of his shoe, the dance of the rolls, and the teetering cabin. However, the greatness of The Gold Rush does not rest solely on its comedy sequences but on the fact that they are integrated so fully into a character-driven narrative. Chaplin had no reservations about the finished product. Indeed, in the contemporary publicity for the film, he is quoted, 'This is the picture that I want to be remembered by.'"

The Japanese filmmaker Akira Kurosawa cited The Gold Rush as one of his favorite films.

The film is recognized by American Film Institute in these lists:

- 1998: AFI's 100 Years... 100 Movies – #74
- 2000: AFI's 100 Years... 100 Laughs – #25
- 2007: AFI's 100 Years... 100 Movies (10th Anniversary Edition) – #58

The Village Voice ranked The Gold Rush at No. 49 in its Top 250 "Best Films of the Century" list in 1999, based on a poll of critics. Entertainment Weekly voted it at No.15 on their list of 100 Greatest Movies of All Time. The film was voted at No. 97 on the list of "100 Greatest Films" by the prominent French magazine Cahiers du cinéma in 2008. In the 2012 Sight & Sound poll, it was ranked the 91st-greatest film ever made in the directors' poll. In 2015, The Gold Rush ranked 17th on BBC's "The 100 Greatest American Films" list, voted on by film critics from around the world. The film was voted at No. 25 on the list of The 100 greatest comedies of all time by a poll of 253 film critics from 52 countries conducted by the BBC in 2017. On the review aggregator website Rotten Tomatoes, 98% of 87 critics' reviews are positive. The website's consensus reads: "A delightful blend of slapstick humor, poignant emotion, and social commentary, The Gold Rush encapsulates Chaplin's strengths as a writer, director, and star."

== 1942 re-release ==
In 1942, Chaplin released a new version of The Gold Rush, modifying the original silent 1925 film by adding a recorded musical score, adding a narration which he recorded himself and tightening the editing, which reduced the film's running time by several minutes. The film was further shortened by being run at the 24 frames per second rate of sound films. Like most silent movies, it was originally shot and exhibited at a slower speed. Chaplin also changed some plot points. Besides removing the ending kiss, another edit eliminated a subplot in which the Lone Prospector is tricked into believing Georgia is in love with him by Georgia's paramour, Jack. In the original 1925 version, Georgia and Jack go to the lone prospector's cabin while he is out. Georgia, seeing the nice dinner he had prepared for her, is guilt-ridden over having stood him up on New Year's Eve. Jack, oblivious to her distress, makes advances, but she refuses to kiss him. He forces himself on her and she strikes him. The following day, she writes Jack a note apologizing: "I'm sorry for what I did last night. Please forgive me. I love you, Georgia." She asks a waiter to hand the note to Jack. She watches his callous reaction from afar and is crushed by it.

When the Prospector enters the dance hall, Jack decides to play a prank on him. He tells the waiter, "Hand this note to that bum, but don't tell him it's from me." When the Prospector reads Georgia's note, believing she wrote it to him, he is overcome with joy and rushes around the dance hall searching for her.

Literary critic Manny Farber, writing in The New Republic, on the 1942 re-release of The Gold Rush:

You see things that are so peculiarly a result of Chaplin's genius you can't explain them...These situations begin with something absurd: a dancer's feet represented by two bread rolls, a house half on, half off a cliff, a meal made of a shoe. But Chaplin's pantomime changes the absurdity into something significant with human feeling—the roles come alive with the personality of a dancer, the house, for all its triteness, becomes a stirring reality, and what happens to the shoes is unbelievable. An absurdity has been made real and enormously significant, and this is where you feel whatever emotion was intended by Chaplin...

The new music score by Max Terr and the sound recording by James L. Fields were nominated for Academy Awards in 1943.

The Gold Rush was the first of Chaplin's classic silent films that he converted to sound. The 2012 Blu-ray release revealed that the reissue of The Gold Rush preserved most of the footage from the original film. Even the restored print of the 1925 original shows noticeable degradation of image and missing frames, artifacts not seen in the 1942 version.

== Copyright and home media ==
In 1953, the original 1925 film may have entered the public domain in the US, as Chaplin did not renew its copyright registration in the 28th year after publication in accordance with American law at the time. As such, the film was once widely available on home video in the US. After 1995, Chaplin's estate blocked unauthorized releases of The Gold Rush in the United States by arguing that the film's U.S. copyright had been restored by the Uruguay Round Agreements Act. Regardless, in 2021, the original film definitively entered the public domain in the United States as 95 years had passed since its release.

In 2012, both the reconstruction of the 1925 silent version and the 1942 narrated reissue version were released on Blu-ray by the Criterion Collection. This set included a new audio commentary track by Chaplin biographer and scholar Jeffrey Vance.

== In popular culture ==
The "roll dance" that the Little Tramp character performs in the film is considered one of the more memorable scenes in film history; however, Roscoe Arbuckle did something similar in the 1917 movie The Rough House which co-starred Buster Keaton. Curly Howard made a brief homage to the bit in the 1935 Three Stooges film Pardon My Scotch. Anna Karina's character in Bande à part makes references to it before the famous dance scene. It was replicated by Robert Downey Jr. in his lead role as Charles Chaplin in the 1992 Chaplin, which briefly depicts the production of the film; Johnny Depp's character in the 1993 film Benny and Joon; Grampa Simpson in the 1994 The Simpsons episode "Lady Bouvier's Lover"; and Amy Adams's character in The Muppets. The "hanging cabin on the edge of the cliff" sequence (starting at 1:19 in video inserted above) has been used in two Indian movies: Michael Madana Kama Rajan and Welcome.

== Legacy ==
A new 4K restoration of The Gold Rush enjoyed its world premiere at the Cannes Film Festival in celebration of the film's centennial. The audience included two of Chaplin's grandchildren: Kiera Chaplin and Spencer Chaplin.

On the exact 100th anniversary date, June 26, 2025, the restoration screened in cinemas worldwide. Its exclusive U.S. premiere took place at Hollywood's iconic Egyptian Theatre, where The Gold Rush had its original world premiere a century earlier. The event was introduced by Chaplin biographer Jeffrey Vance.

Over 500 screenings in 70 countries are planned as part of the global centennial celebration.

== See also ==
- List of films set around New Year

== Sources ==
- Balio, Tino (2009). United Artists: The Company Built by the Stars. University of Wisconsin Press. p. 57. ISBN 978-0299230043.
- Farber, Manny (February 2, 2016). Farber on Film: The Complete Film Writings of Manny Farber: A Library of America Special Publication. Library of America. ISBN 978-1-59853-470-2.
- Maland, Charles J. (1989). Chaplin and American Culture: The Evolution of a Star Image. Princeton University Press. ISBN 0-691-09440-3. "The United Artists balance sheet of domestic film rentals through the end of 1931 show that The Gold Rush had accumulated $2.15 million in rentals, while The Circus had garnered $1.82 million."
- Schneider, Steven Jay (2006). 1001 Movies You Must See Before You Die (in Swedish). Wahlström & Widstrand. ISBN 978-9146213307.
- Vance, Jeffrey (November 1, 2003). Chaplin: Genius Of The Cinema. Harry N. Abrams. ISBN 978-0-8109-4532-6.
