= The Bachelor Girl (film) =

1929 film

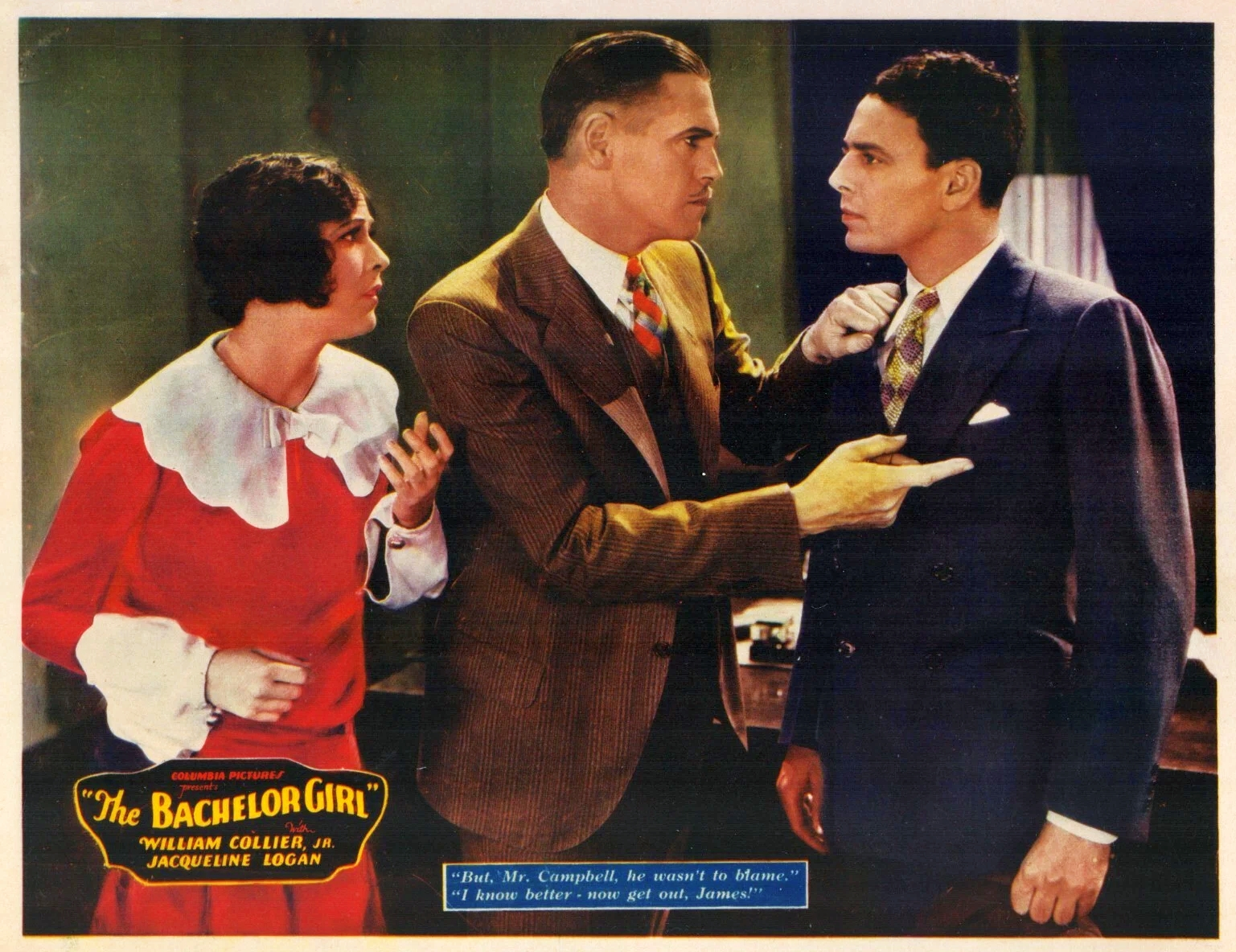
- Lobby card
- Directed by: Richard Thorpe
- Written by: Jack Townley (story and continuity); Weldon Melick (titles)
- Produced by: Harry Cohn
- Starring: William Collier Jr.; Jacqueline Logan; Thelma Todd
- Cinematography: Joseph Walker
- Edited by: Ben Pivar
- Production company: Columbia Pictures
- Distributed by: Columbia Pictures
- Release date: May 20, 1929
- Running time: 65 minutes
- Country: United States
- Languages: Sound (Part-Talkie); English Intertitles

The Bachelor Girl is a 1929 American sound part-talkie comedy drama film directed by Richard Thorpe and starring William Collier Jr., Jacqueline Logan and Thelma Todd. In addition to sequences with audible dialogue or talking sequences, the film features a synchronized musical score and sound effects along with English intertitles. The soundtrack was recorded using the Western Electric sound-on-film system. According to Variety, 25 percent of the running time of the film featured dialogue.

== Cast ==
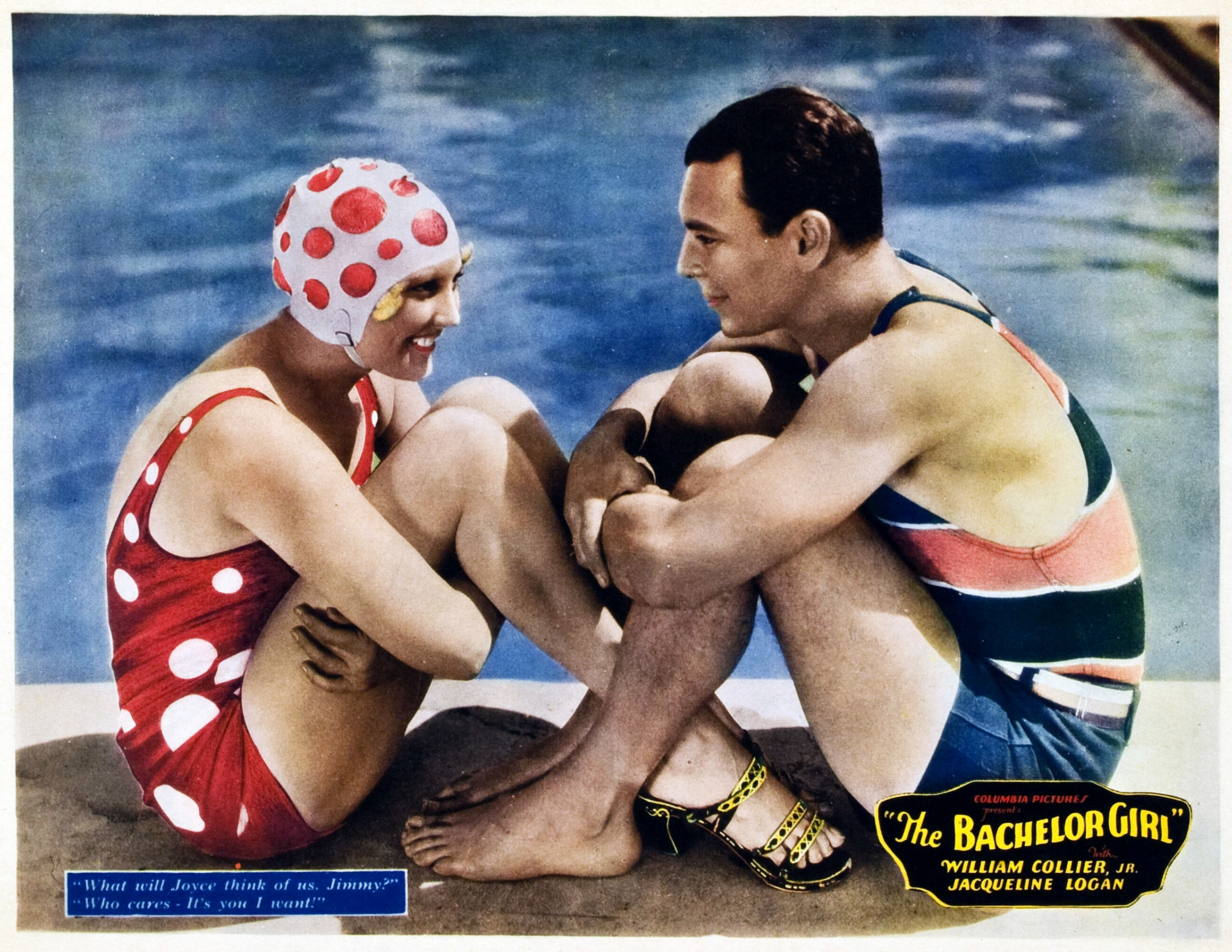
Poster for the 1929 film "The Bachelor Girl"

- William Collier Jr. as Jimmy
- Jacqueline Logan as Joyce
- Thelma Todd as Gladys
- Edward Hearn as Campbell

== Music ==
The musical score for the film was composed by Constantin Bakaleinikoff.

== Production ==
This was Jacqueline Logan's first talking film.

== Preservation ==
The film is currently believed to be lost.

== See also ==
- List of early sound feature films (1926–1929)
