= William Collier Jr. =

American actor (1902–1987)

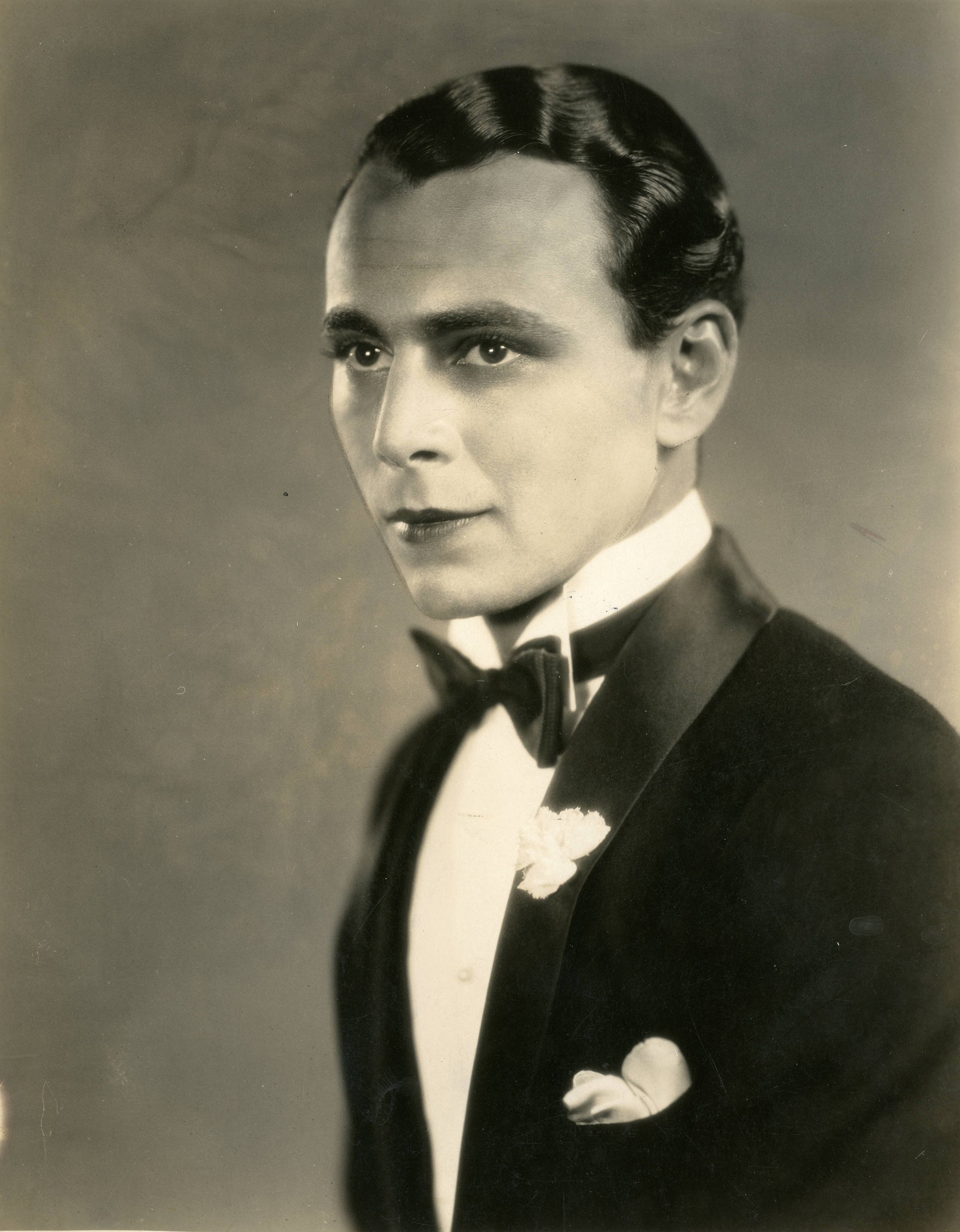
- Collier in 1926
- Born: Charles F. Gall Jr. February 12, 1902; New York City, U.S.
- Died: February 5, 1987 (aged 84); San Francisco, California, U.S.
- Occupation: Actor
- Years active: Actor: 1916–1935 producer: 1946–1956
- Spouse: Marie Stevens (1934–1981) (her death)
- Children: 1

William Collier Jr. (born Charles F. Gall Jr.; February 12, 1902 – February 5, 1987) was an American stage performer, producer, and a film actor who in the silent and sound eras was cast in no fewer than 89 motion pictures.

== Biography ==
William Collier (nicknamed "Buster") was born in New York City. When his parents divorced, his mother, the actress Paula Marr, remarried the actor William Collier Sr. who adopted Charles (the two did share a resemblance) and gave the boy the new name William Collier Jr. Collier's acting experience in childhood, having first appeared on stage at age seven, helped him get his first movie role at age 14 in The Bugle Call (1916).

In 1910 his parents were appearing in Denver and Collier was hospitalized with scarlet fever, which was followed by typhoid, but he eventually recovered by the end of the summer and was able to join his parents who were appearing at Elitch Theatre. He appeared in his father's show, The Patriot, as Kid Sugar.

He later became a popular leading man in the 1920s and successfully made the transition from silent into sound film. Nevertheless, he retired from acting in 1935, and in 1937 traveled to England to work as a movie producer. He returned to the United States in the late 1940s and began producing drama series for television. In February 1960, in recognition of his contributions to the entertainment industry, Collier received a star on the Hollywood Walk of Fame.

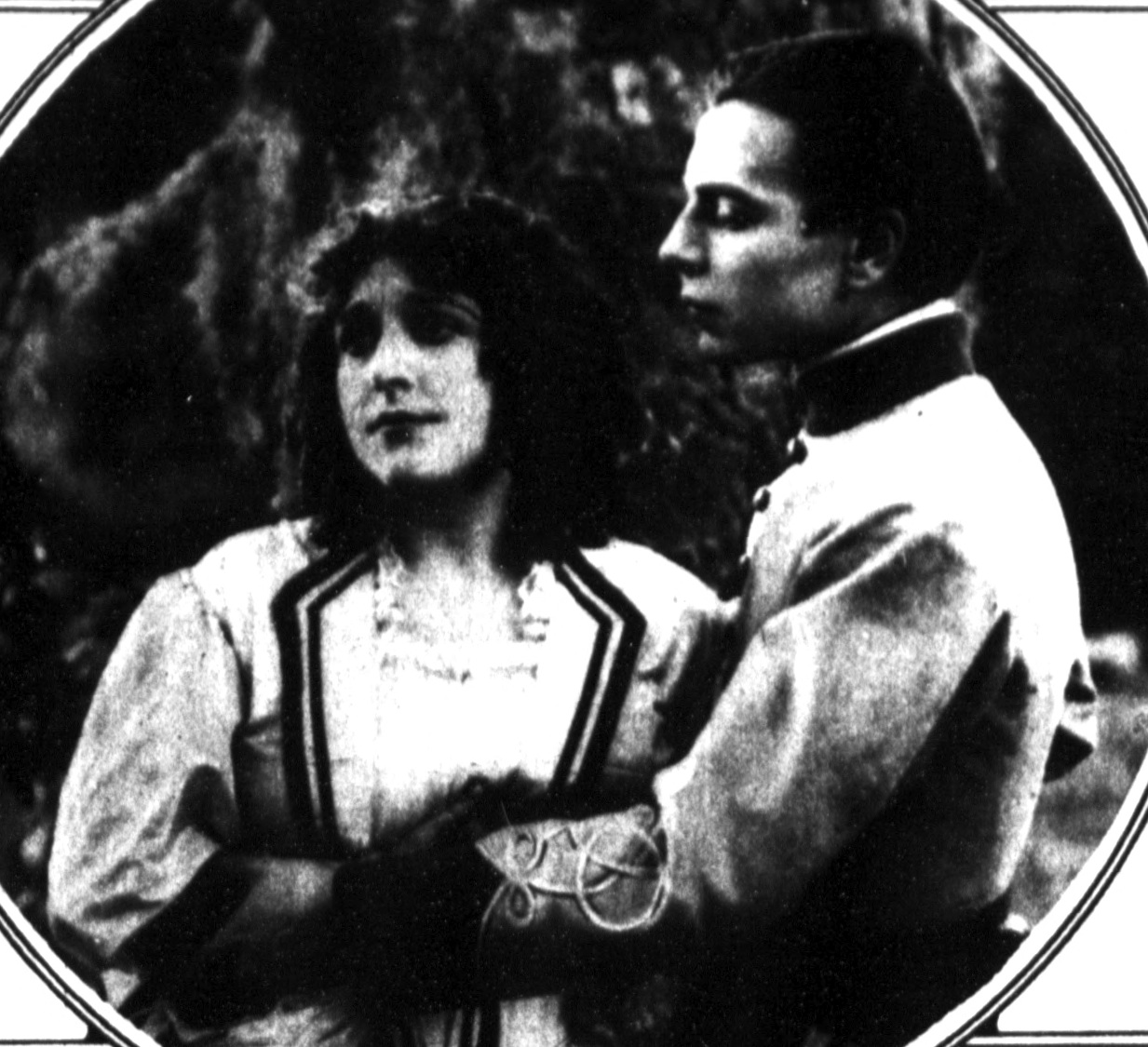
Collier & Catherine Calvert in The Heart of Maryland (1921)

Collier died in San Francisco on February 5, 1987, just a week before his 85th birthday.

== Selected filmography as an actor ==
- The Bugle Call (1916) - Billy Andrews
- Never Again (1916, Short)
- Back Stage (1919, Short) - Minor Role (uncredited)
- The Servant Question (1920) - Jack Merrick
- The Soul of Youth (1920) - Dick Armstrong
- Everybody's Sweetheart (1920) - John
- The Heart of Maryland (1921) - Lloyd Calvert
- The Girl from Porcupine (1921) - Jim McTvish
- At the Stage Door (1921) - Arthur Bates
- Cardigan (1922) - Michael Cardigan
- The Good Provider (1922) - Izzy Binswanger
- The Secrets of Paris (1922) - François
- Enemies of Women (1923) - Gaston
- Sinner or Saint (1923) - Young Artist
- Loyal Lives (1923) - Terrence
- The Age of Desire (1923) - Ranny - Age 21
- Pleasure Mad (1923) - Howard Benton
- Leave It to Gerry (1924) - Dan Forbes
- Fools Highway (1924) - Max Davidson
- The Sea Hawk (1924) - Marsak
- Wine of Youth (1924) - Max Cooper
- The Mine with the Iron Door (1924) - Chico
- Great Diamond Mystery (1924) - Perry Standish
- The Lighthouse by the Sea (1924) - Bob Dorn
- The Devil's Cargo (1925) - John Joyce
- The Reckless Sex (1925) - Juan
- Eve's Secret (1925) - Pierre
- The Verdict (1925) - Jimmy Mason
- Playing with Souls (1925) - Matthew Dale Jr.
- The Wanderer (1925) - Jether
- The Lucky Lady (1926) - Clarke
- The Rainmaker (1926) - Bobby Robertson
- The Lady of the Harem (1926) - Rafi
- God Gave Me Twenty Cents (1926) - Barney Tapman
- Just Another Blonde (1926) - Scotty
- The Broken Gate (1927) - Don Lane
- Backstage (1927) - Owen Mackay
- Convoy (1927) - John Dodge
- The Sunset Derby (1927) - Jimmy Burke
- Dearie (1927) - Stephen Darling
- Stranded (1927) - Johnny Nash
- The Desired Woman (1927) - Lieutenant Larry Trent
- The College Widow (1927) - Billy Bolton
- So This Is Love? (1928) - Jerry McGuire
- The Tragedy of Youth (1928) - Dick Wayne
- A Night of Mystery (1928) - Jérôme D'Egremont
- The Lion and the Mouse (1928) - Jefferson Ryder
- Women They Talk About (1928) - Steve Harrison
- Beware of Bachelors (1928) - Ed
- The Floating College (1928) - George Dewey
- The Red Sword (1929) - Paul
- One Stolen Night (1929) - Bob
- Tide of Empire (1929) - Romauldo Guerrero
- Hardboiled Rose (1929) - Edward Malo
- The Donovan Affair (1929) - Cornish
- The Bachelor Girl (1929) - Jimmy
- New Orleans (1929) - Billy Slade
- Two Men and a Maid (1929) - Jim Oxford
- The College Coquette (1929) - Tom Marion
- The Show of Shows (1929) - Performer in 'Bicycle Built for Two' Number
- Lummox (1930) - Wally Wallenstein
- The Melody Man (1930) - Al Tyler
- A Royal Romance (1930) - John Hale
- New Movietone Follies of 1930 (1930) - Conrad Sterling
- Rain or Shine (1930) - Bud Conway
- The March of Time (1930) - Himself
- Reducing (1931) - Johnnie Beasley
- Little Caesar (1931) - Tony Passa
- Cimarron (1931) - The Kid
- Broadminded (1931) - Jack Hackett
- Bought (1931) - Reporter (uncredited)
- Street Scene (1931) - Sam Kaplan
- The Big Gamble (1931) - Johnnie Ames
- Sporting Chance (1931) - Terry Nolan
- Soul of the Slums (1931) - Jerry Harris
- The Secret Witness (1931) - Arthur Jones - aka Casey
- Dancers in the Dark (1932) - Floyd Stevens
- The County Fair (1932) - Jimmie Dolan
- The Phantom Express (1932) - Bruce Harrington
- Exposed (1932) - Jim Harper
- The Fighting Gentleman (1932) - Jack Duncan aka The Fighting Gentleman
- Speed Demon (1932) - 'Speed' Morrow
- Behind Jury Doors (1932) - Steve Mannon
- File 113 (1933) - Prosper Botomy
- Forgotten (1933) - Joseph Meyers
- The Story of Temple Drake (1933) - Toddy Gowan
- Her Secret (1933) - Johnny Norton
- Public Stenographer (1934) - James 'Jimmy' Martin Jr.
- The People's Enemy (1935) - Tony Falcone (final film role)

== Bibliography ==
- John Holmstrom, The Moving Picture Boy: An International Encyclopaedia from 1895 to 1995, Norwich, Michael Russell, 1996, p. 16.
