= Green Cinema =

Coordinates: 53.33936°N 6.26155°W

- Stephen's Green Cinema
- Green Cinema before it closed in 1987
- Interactive map of Green Cinema
- Address: 127 St. Stephen's Green; Dublin; Ireland
- Owner: St. Stephen's Green Company
- Capacity: 1,500
- Type: Cinema
- Current use: Demolished

Construction
- Opened: 18 December 1935
- Closed: 1987
- Architects: Jones and Kelly

The Green Cinema was a film theatre that operated in Dublin, Ireland from 1935 until its closure in 1987.

Originally known as the Stephen's Green Cinema, it was located on the west side of St Stephen's Green. It opened on 18 December 1935 in an official ceremony performed by the Lord Mayor of Dublin, Alfie Byrne. The Green was designed by architects Jones and Kelly and had a seating capacity of 1,500. Some seats were equipped with a Fortephone apparatus which enabled deaf patrons to hear the soundtrack. The first film to be screened at the Green was Paris Love Song, starring Mary Ellis and Tullio Carminati.

In October 1987, the Green Cinema was purchased by the Dublin hotelier, PV Doyle, for £1.5m. The cinema was demolished shortly afterwards and the site remained derelict until 2002, when work began on the construction of a new office block. In 2005, the new building was leased by Bank of Scotland (Ireland) as their Irish headquarters.
