= Corliss Palmer =

American actress

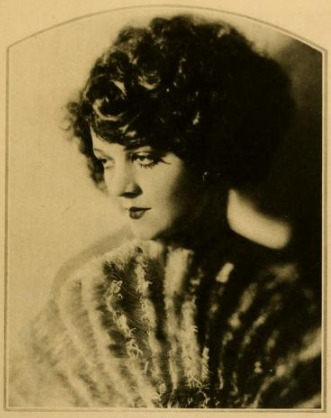
- Palmer c. 1922
- Born: July 25, 1899; Edison, Georgia, U.S.
- Died: August 27, 1952 (aged 53); Camarillo, California, U.S.
- Resting place: Woodlawn Memorial Cemetery, Santa Monica; 34.0178°N 118.4758°E
- Occupation: Actress
- Years active: 1922–1931
- Spouse: Eugene V. Brewster (m. 1926; div. 1931)

Corliss Palmer (July 25, 1899 (Note: Though some sources note Palmer's birth year as 1902, according to NARA microfilm publication T623 (Washington, D.C.: National Archives and Records Administration, 1972.); FHL microfilm 1,240,181, she was born in 1899 and, at the 1900 census, resided in Brooks, Georgia.) – August 27, 1952) was an American silent film actress and model. She first came to public attention after winning Motion Picture Magazine's Fame and Fortune Contest in 1920, upon which she was deemed the "most beautiful girl in America." She would go on to appear in a total of sixteen films between 1922 and 1931.

== Early life ==
Palmer was born to Luther and Julia Palmer in Edison, Georgia on July 25, 1899. She had an older sister, Mary, younger brothers, Hoke and Grady, and a younger sister, Ennis.

== Career ==
In 1920, Palmer entered the "Fame and Fortune Contest" advertised in Motion Picture Magazine. She won the contest, and was heralded by the magazine as the "most beautiful girl in America." The magazine's publisher, Eugene V. Brewster, allowed Palmer significant publicity in the magazine, and began to promote her as she embarked on a film career. Between 1921 and 1923, Motion Picture Magazine published a total of twenty-three articles on Palmer, while its sister publication, Motion Picture Classic, published an additional story on the actress. Palmer also had a cosmetic line named after her featuring Peach Bloom Face Powder, created by the Wilton Chemical Company in New York City, and also appeared on the cover of Beauty, a women's magazine.

She made her film debut in the short From Farm to Fame, documenting her public notoriety after winning the contest, followed by an acting role in Her Second Chance (1926).

After ending her acting career in 1931, Palmer continued to model cosmetics as well as fashions for a local department store.

== Personal life ==
She married Eugene V. Brewster in October 1926. The couple lived on a $500,000 estate in Morristown, New Jersey, but were forced to relocate to a one-bedroom apartment in Hollywood, California in 1931 after Brewster's estate was squandered when his former wife sued him for alienation of affection. The couple would divorce in 1931.

After her divorce, Palmer became an alcoholic, and on January 31, 1933, was committed to a hospital in San Francisco under the pseudonym Edith Mason, a name she had adopted in an attempt to revitalize her film career. It was noted in a March 12, 1933 article in the Portsmouth Daily Times that Palmer "had been drinking steadily for several days," and the hospital staff "feared she might harm herself or set fire to her room." Palmer would spend the latter half of her life in psychiatric institutions. She died in 1952 in Camarillo, California.

== Filmography ==
Key
†	Denotes lost films

Film poster

Year	Title	Role	Notes	Ref.
1922	From Farm to Fame	—N/a	Short film	
1926	Her Second Chance †	Nancy		
1926	Bromo and Juliet	Madge		
1927	The Return of Boston Blackie	Sylvia Markham		
1927	A Man's Past †	Sylvia Cabot		
1927	Polly of the Movies	Lisa Smith		
1927	Honeymoon Hate †	Mrs. Fremont Gage I		
1928	The Noose	Cabaret Girl		
1928	Into the Night	Mrs. Harding		
1928	The Night Bird	Blonde		
1928	George Washington Cohen	Mrs. Gorman		
1928	Trial Marriage	—N/a		
1928	Scarlet Youth	—N/a		
1928	Clothes Make the Woman	—N/a		
1929	Sex Madness	—N/a		
1929	Broadway Fever	Lila Leroy		

== Notes ==
Explanatory notes
