= Picturegoer =

British film magazine (1911–1960)

Petula Clark on the cover of the 3 December 1949 issue

Picturegoer was a fan magazine published in the United Kingdom between 1911 and 23 April 1960.

== Background ==
The magazine was started in 1911 under the name The Pictures and in 1914 it merged with Picturegoer. Following the merge it was renamed Pictures and The Picturegoer, which continued until 1920. The same year it was renamed as Pictures for the Picturegoer.

It began publication with the name Picturegoer in January 1921. Odhams Press was the publisher of the magazine during the early years. It was initially published monthly through May 1931, switching to weekly publication on 30 May 1931 as Picturegoer Weekly. In September 1939, Picturegoer incorporated Film Weekly, and in September 1941 it became a bi-weekly. It went back to weekly publication every Thursday in July 1949.

Picturegoer featured the screen's biggest stars and was sold at all cinemas. Clark Gable, Laurence Olivier, Bette Davis, Paulette Goddard, Petula Clark, Fred Astaire, and Richard Burton were among the hundreds of stars who graced its front cover. Its circulation reached a peak of 325,000 during the mid-1940s.

After World War II, it found itself competing with periodicals published by the Rank Organisation, Odeon Cinemas, and Associated British Cinemas, which replaced Picturegoer with their own magazines at their theatre kiosks. As a result, Picturegoer became more sensational in the 1950s, with covers featuring cheesecake and beefcake-style artwork. The magazine missed publication on 1 March 1947 and from 4 July 1959 to 15 August 1959.

It eventually merged with the pop music magazine Disc Date. Shortly after the Picturegoer name was dropped and the publication concentrated solely on music. The last issue of Picturegoer with Disc Date was published on 23 April 1960, with a cover showcasing Jackie Rae and Janette Scott.

== See also ==
- Picture Show magazine
