= Eugene V. Brewster =

American lawyer

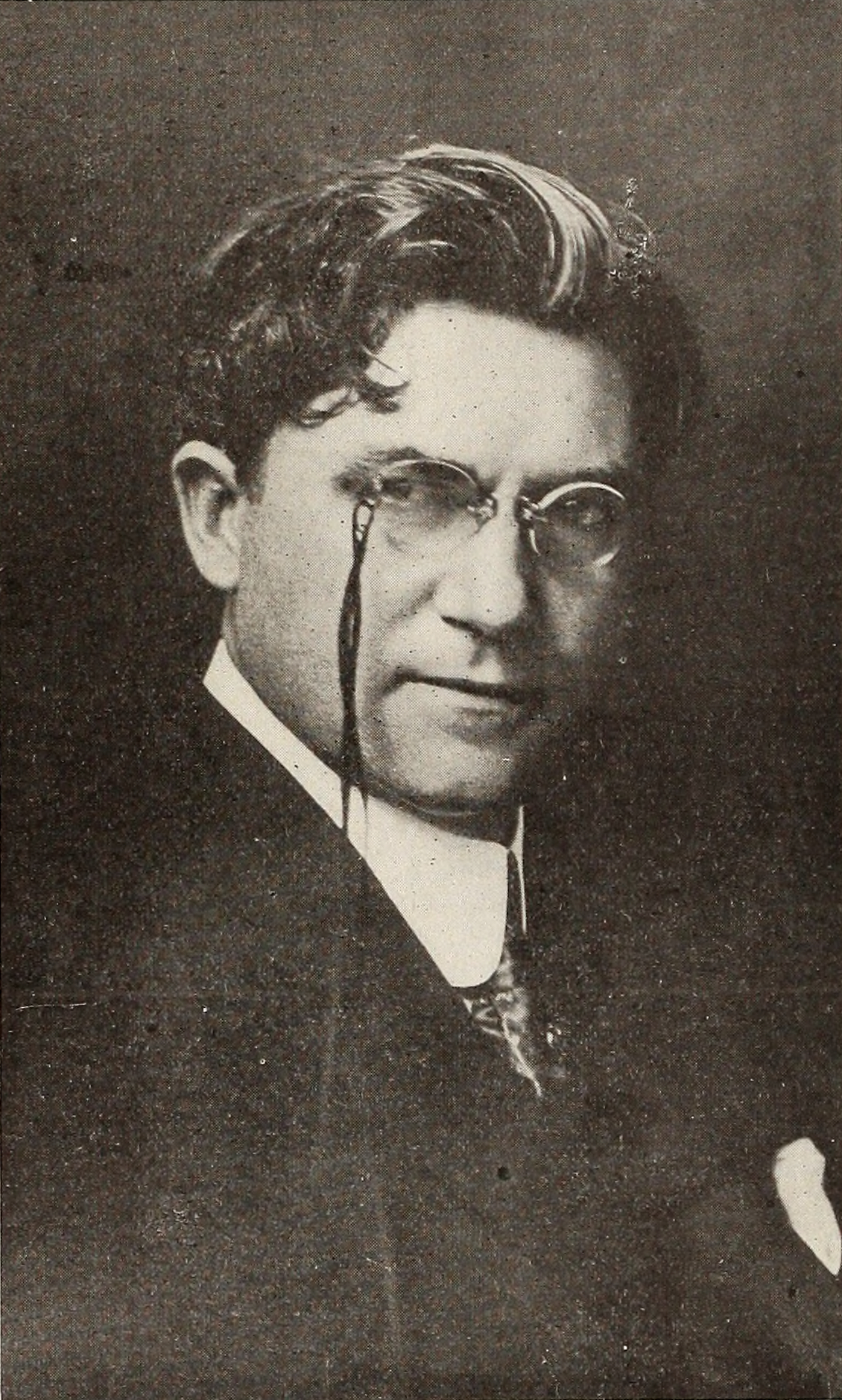
- Born: September 7, 1869; Bay Shore, New York, U.S.
- Died: January 1, 1939 (aged 69)
- Spouse: Corliss Palmer

Eugene Valentine Brewster (September 7, 1869 – January 1, 1939) was an American lawyer, editor, artist, and publisher. He was editor and publisher of Motion Picture Magazine, Shadowland, and Motion Picture Classic, which made him wealthy, only to file for bankruptcy years later. He was married four times, most notably to the actress Corliss Palmer.

Brewster was born in Bay Shore, New York, the son of Henry and Clotilda Brewster. He attended Princeton University and studied law, becoming admitted to New York State bar in 1894. He first rose to prominence as "boy orator" of Grover Cleveland's 1892 presidential campaign. He was a Chairman of the Democratic Ways and Means Committee, and organized banquets in support of William Jennings Bryan, along with his first wife who founded the Women's Bryan League. He was the Social Democratic candidate for New York Attorney General in 1900.

As an artist he specialized in landscape paintings, and was a founder and president of the Allied Arts Association of Brooklyn.

Brewster married screen ingenue Corliss Palmer in 1926, and they lived on a $500,000 estate in New Jersey. Brewster's fortunes took a disastrous turn in 1931 when his former wife sued for alienation of affection, compounded by the failures of Brewster's own investments. He and Palmer, nearly wiped out, were forced to relocate to a small bungalow in California. Palmer left him that same year. (See the Wikipedia entry for Corliss Palmer.)

He died on January 1, 1939, and was cremated at Fresh Pond Crematory in Queens, New York.
