= Her Second Chance (1926 film) =

1926 film

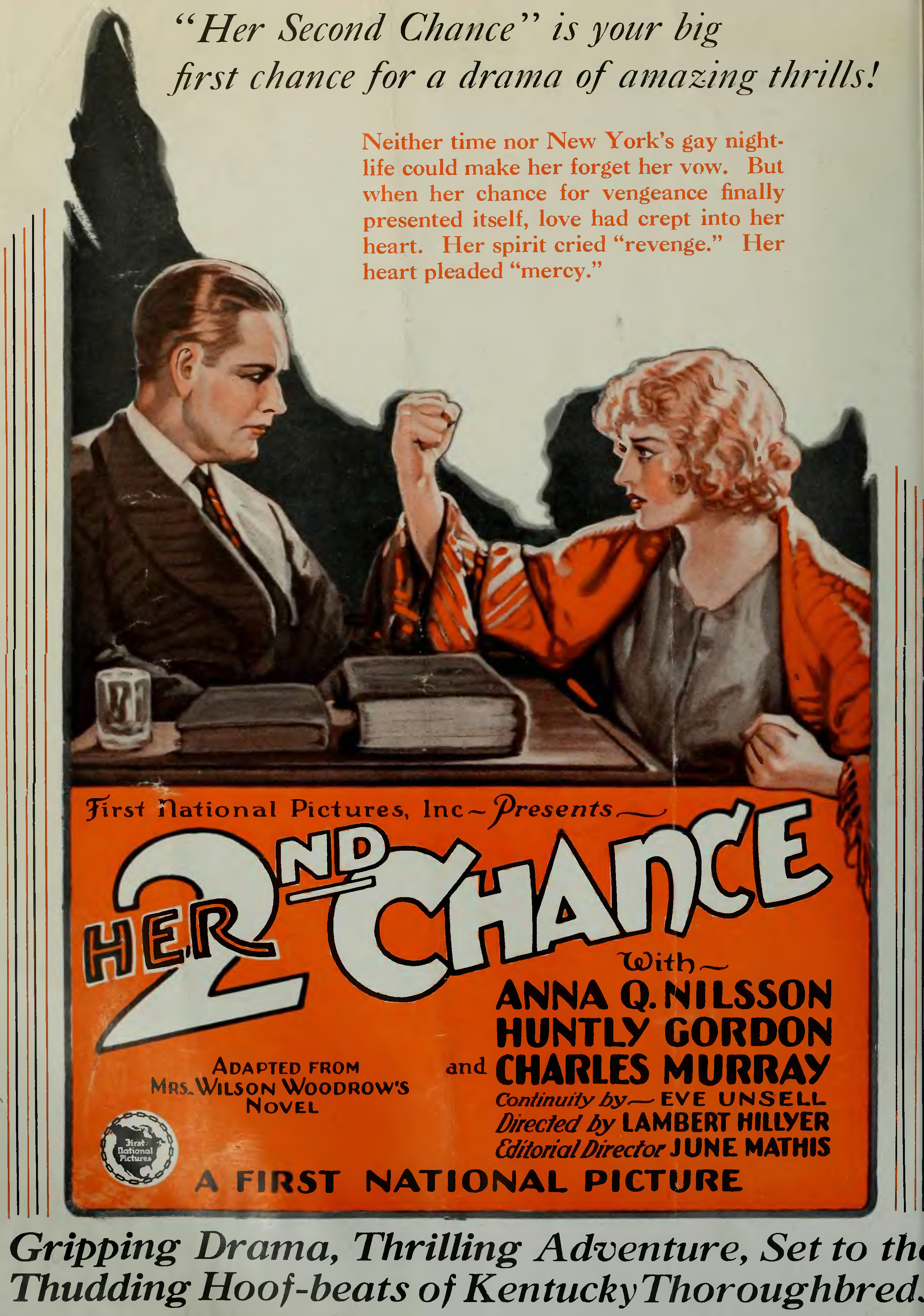
- Advertisement
- Directed by: Lambert Hillyer
- Written by: Eve Unsell (continuity); June Mathis (editorial dir.)
- Based on: The Second Chance by Edith Bolling
- Starring: Anna Q. Nilsson
- Cinematography: John W. Boyle
- Edited by: George McGuire
- Production company: Vitagraph Company of America
- Distributed by: First National Pictures
- Release date: March 28, 1926
- Running time: 70 minutes
- Country: United States
- Language: Silent (English intertitles)

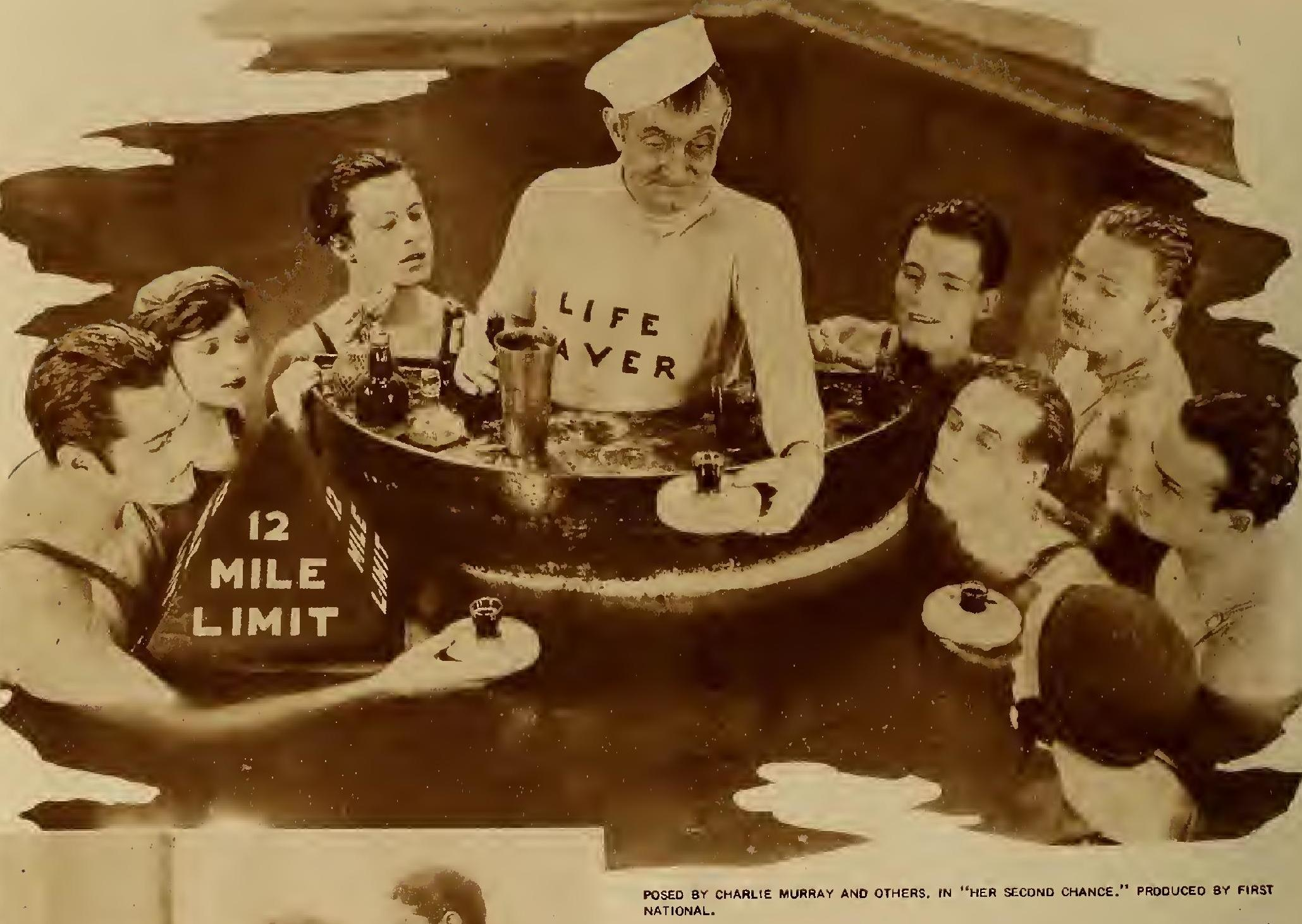
Charlie Murray poses with others in Her Second Chance ad in 1926 Film Fun

Her Second Chance is a 1926 American silent romantic drama film directed by Lambert Hillyer and starring Anna Q. Nilsson. It was produced by Vitagraph Company of America and distributed through First National Pictures.

== Plot ==
As described in a film magazine review, young Kentucky woman Caroline Logan has been sentenced to two years in jail for shooting a sheriff who was attempting to evict her from her home. On her release, she vows to get revenge on Judge Clay Jeffries, who had imposed the sentence. The enemies of Jeffries agree to fight her case and win, and the sale of her property makes her a rich woman. She invests in racehorses and her attorney advisor Beachey, who had assisted in her plan to seek vengeance on the judge, has their own plan to blackball the judge in a scandal that would prevent his reelection. However, Caroline suddenly finds herself in love with Jeffries and, after some suspense in which Caroline must reach the racetrack before the start of a horse race that may ruin the judge, the fraudulent scheme fails. Caroline and Jeffries start life anew together.

== Cast ==
- Anna Q. Nilsson as Mrs. Constance Lee / Caroline Logan
- Huntley Gordon as Judge Clay Jeffries
- Charles Murray as Bell
- Sam De Grasse as Beachey
- William J. Kelly as Gabriel
- Mike Donlin as De Vries
- Dale Fuller as Delia
- Jed Prouty as Stable boy
- Corliss Palmer as Nancy

== Preservation ==
With no prints of Her Second Chance located in any film archives, it is a lost film.
