= When You're in Love (film) =

1937 film by Robert Riskin, Harry Lachman

- Theatrical release poster
- Directed by: Robert Riskin; Harry Lachman (uncredited)
- Screenplay by: Robert Riskin
- Story by: Ethel Hill; Cedric Worth
- Produced by: Everett Riskin; Harry Lachmman (uncredited)
- Starring: Grace Moore; Cary Grant
- Cinematography: Joseph Walker
- Edited by: Gene Milford
- Music by: Alfred Newman (uncredited); Songs: Jerome Kern (music); Dorothy Fields (lyrics)
- Production company: Columbia Pictures
- Distributed by: Columbia Pictures
- Release date: February 12, 1937 (US)
- Running time: 104 minutes
- Country: United States
- Language: English

When You're in Love is a 1937 American musical film directed by Robert Riskin and Harry Lachman, who was not credited, and starring Grace Moore and Cary Grant. Moore sings "Minnie the Moocher" and the Ernesto Lecuona classic Cuban song "Siboney". Two of the other songs in the film – "Our Song" and "The Whistling Boy" – are by Jerome Kern and Dorothy Fields.

The film was briefly released on VHS tape during the 1980s but has never been officially released on DVD. On May 6, 2016, the getTV channel featured the broadcast premiere of a newly restored print of the film. Film critic Thomas Gladysz described it as "one of those 'old movies' few people have heard of, and even fewer have seen. Nevertheless, it is a charming and entertaining film deserving a wider audience."

== Plot ==
Jimmy Hudson (Cary Grant) is a vagabond American artist in Mexico who can't pay his hotel bill. Louise Fuller (Grace Moore) is an acclaimed classical singer recently expelled from the U.S. to Mexico on an expired visa, and desperate to get back in. She hires Hudson to marry her so that she can regain entry to the United States in time to give a benefit performance, stipulating that he must divorce her within six months to receive his final payment. Hudson agrees only because he sees something special in her, but thinks she has lost her way both personally and artistically in fame, her entourage, and her career. Once they have returned to the country and gone their separate ways, Hudson begins pursuing her, hoping to bridge their differences by drawing her from her own gilded world into his, and thus to turn their sham marriage into something real.

== Cast ==
- Grace Moore as Louise Fuller
- Cary Grant as Jimmy Hudson
- Aline MacMahon as Marianne Woods
- Henry Stephenson as Walter Mitchell
- Thomas Mitchell as Hank Miller
- Catherine Doucet as Jane Summers
- Luis Alberni as Luis Perugini
- Gerald Oliver Smith as Gerald Meeker
- Emma Dunn as Mrs. Hamilton
- George C. Pearce as Mr. Hamilton
- Frank Puglia as Carlos

Cast notes:

- Louise Brooks makes a brief appearance, uncredited, as one of many ballet dancers in a musical sequence. She carries a torch. Brooks, who had retired from films, was trying to work her way back up, and Columbia Pictures had offered her a film test contingent upon appearing in this film.

== Reception ==
Writing for Night and Day in 1937, Graham Greene gave the film a poor review, primarily complaining of the acting of Grace Moore. Characterizing Moore's acting as "sensible and hygienic", Greene found that the casting simply doesn't work with the crazy comedic plot and writing.

== See also ==
- 1937 in film
