= Modern Screen =

20th-century American fan magazine

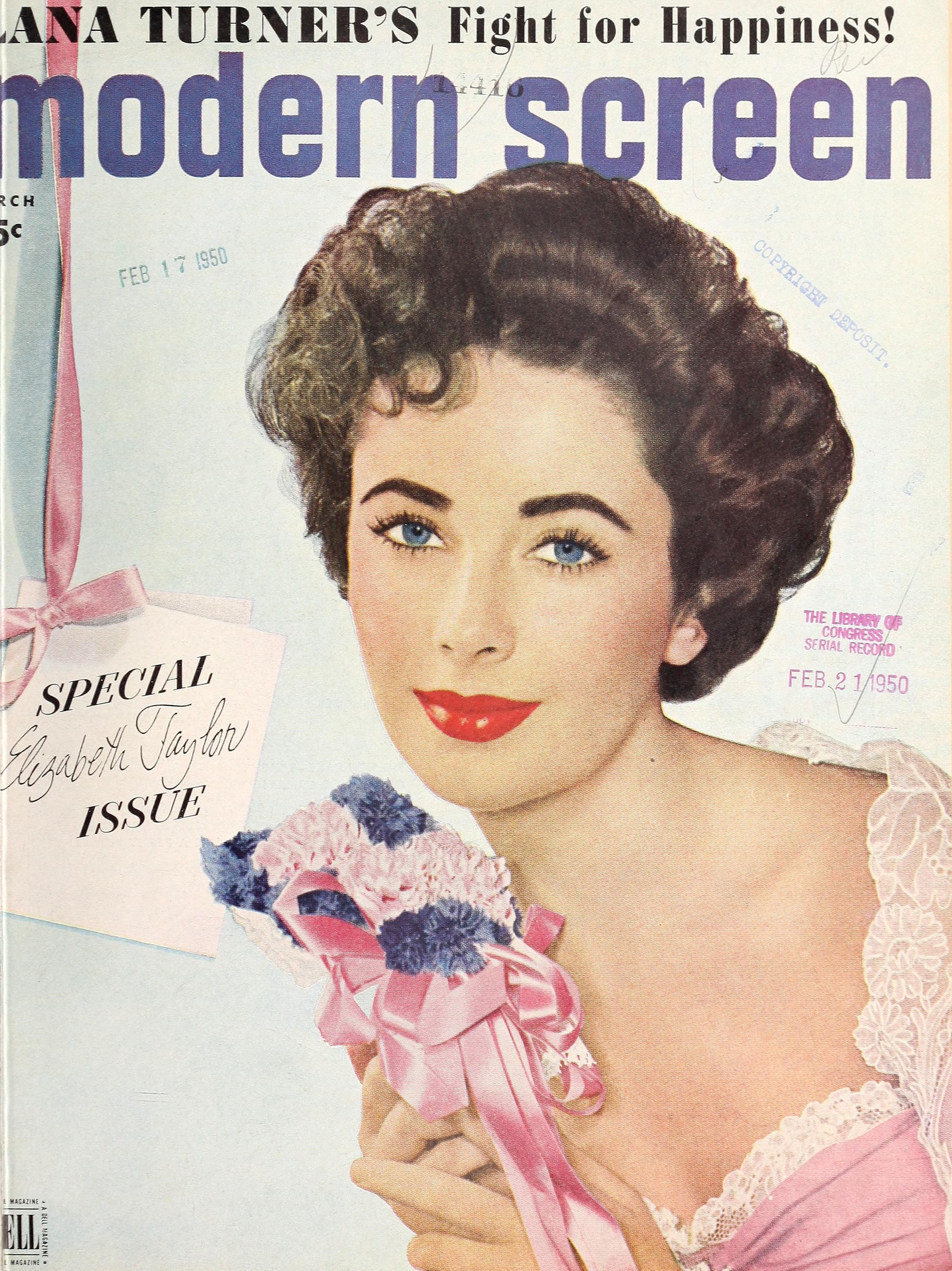
- Cover of the March 1950 issue featuring Elizabeth Taylor
- Categories: Fan magazine
- Frequency: Monthly
- Founded: 1930
- Final issue: 1985
- Company: Dell Magazines
- Country: United States
- Based in: New York City
- Language: English
- ISSN: 0026-8429

Modern Screen was an American fan magazine published between 1930 and 1985 that featured articles, pictorials and interviews with film stars (and later television and music personalities).

== Founding ==
Modern Screen magazine debuted on November 3, 1930. Founded by the Dell Company of New York City it initially sold for 10 cents. Modern Screen quickly became popular and by 1933 it had become Photoplay magazine's main competition. It began to brag on its cover that it had "The Largest Circulation of Any Screen Magazine", and Jean Harlow is seen reading a copy of Modern Screen in the 1933 film Dinner at Eight.

During the early 1930s, the magazine featured artwork portraits of film stars on the cover. By 1940 it featured natural color photographs of the stars and was charging 15 cents per issue.

Modern Screen had many different editors-in-chief over the years, including Richard Heller, who understood the importance of the fan magazine's contribution to movie sales and Mark Bego, who edited the book The Best of Modern Screen (St. Martin's Press, 1986). The editor most associated with the magazine, however, was Regina Cannon (1900–1992), but her standards for publication were so low that Carl F. Cotter, who wrote 'Forty Hacks of the Fan Mags' (The Coast, 1939), declared her stories to be the worst of the entire lot.

Contributors to the magazine included famed photographer George Hurrell and famed writers like Faith Baldwin. Louella Parsons wrote a column entitled "Good News."

== Decline of the magazine ==
Modern Screen remained a major success through the 1950s but a downturn in movie ticket sales at the end of the decade led to a general sales decline in the magazine. Still Modern Screen managed to remain popular. On January 3, 1967, The Film Daily declared that 50% of movie ticket sales were influenced by fan magazines such as Modern Screen and Photoplay. The magazine remained popular through the 1970s, and Lily Tomlin released her 1975 comedy album Modern Scream, a parody of celebrity magazines. In the early 1980s, however, the popularity of general interest celebrity publications like People Magazine proved to be the end of old-fashioned movie fan magazines. Modern Screen became a bimonthly magazine, but in 1985 publication of the magazine ceased.

In 1992, the Modern Screen name was revived for a country music fan magazine titled Modern Screen's Country Music.

== Legal issues ==
=== Troy Donahue lawsuit ===
On January 16, 1963, actor Troy Donahue filed a $200,000 lawsuit in Santa Monica against Modern Screen, Dell Publishing Co., and 17 year old Joyce Becker, a self-described actress and writer, who wrote an inflammatory article the magazine published titled, “The First Time Troy Made Love to Me.”

Donahue protested that the article described them as better friends than they really were. His lawyer said they were only casually acquainted and had met only once, when Becker interviewed Donahue for a teen magazine. Donahue's action claimed that the story violated privacy and said the statements in the article were “unjustified and untrue.”

Eventually, Dell Publishing Co. printed a retraction, and paid Donahue an undisclosed settlement.
