= New Moon (1930 film) =

1930 film

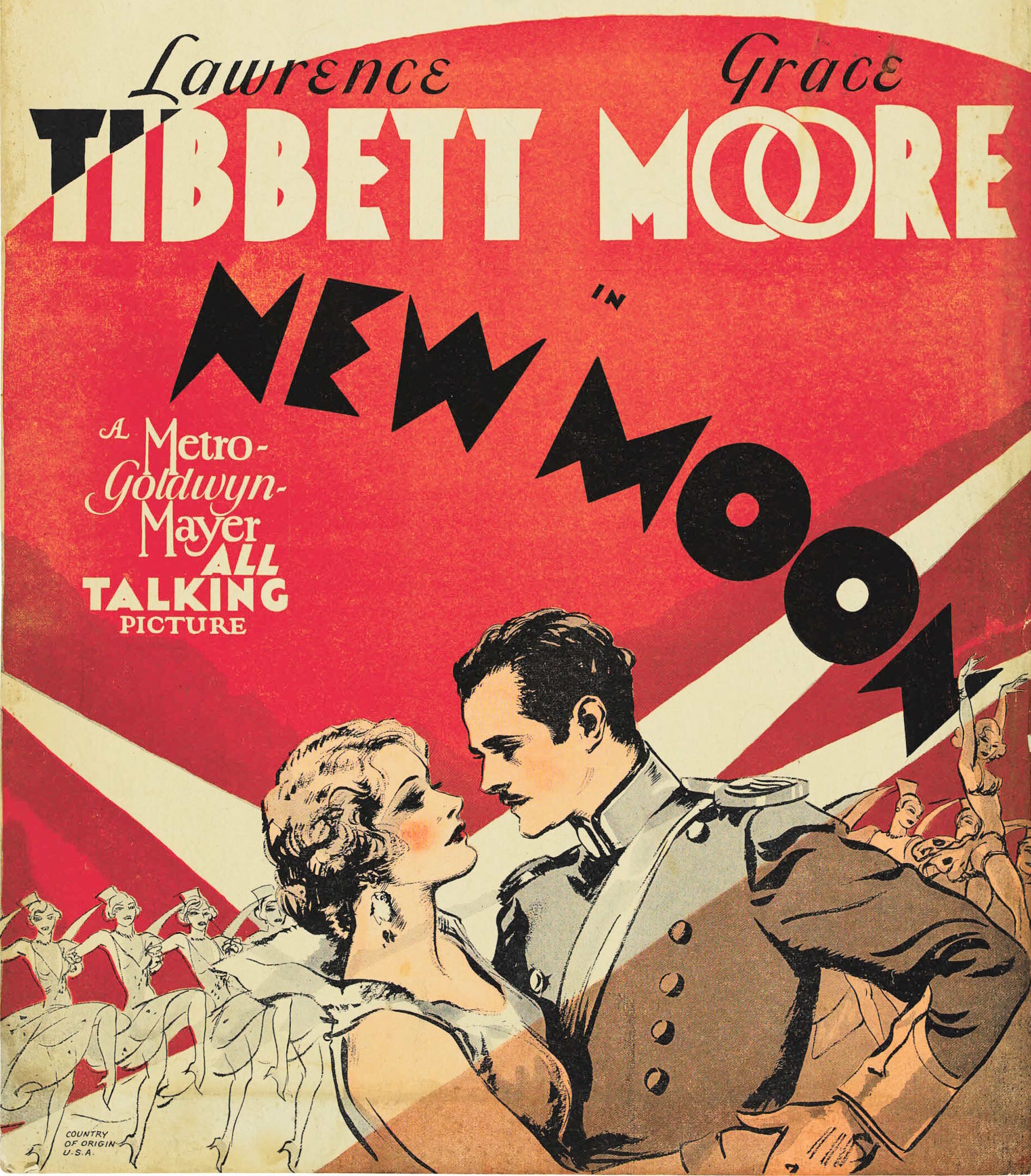
- Window card poster
- Directed by: Jack Conway
- Written by: Sylvia Thalberg; Frank Butler; Cyril Hume (dialogue)
- Based on: The New Moon; 1928 operetta by Oscar Hammerstein II; Frank Mandel; Laurence Schwab; Sigmund Romberg
- Produced by: Paul Bern
- Starring: Lawrence Tibbett; Grace Moore; Adolphe Menjou; Roland Young; Gus Shy; Emily Fitzroy
- Cinematography: Oliver T. Marsh
- Edited by: Margaret Booth
- Music by: William Axt
- Production company: Metro-Goldwyn-Mayer
- Distributed by: Metro-Goldwyn-Mayer
- Release date: December 23, 1930 (New York)
- Running time: 78 minutes
- Country: United States
- Language: English

New Moon is a 1930 American pre-Code romantic drama musical film directed by Jack Conway, starred Grace Moore and Lawrence Tibbett. It is based on the operetta The New Moon, with music by Sigmund Romberg and book and lyrics by Oscar Hammerstein II and others. The original stage version premiered on Broadway in 1928. A second adaptation, also titled New Moon, was released in 1940. To avoid confusion with the later version, the film was shown on television as Parisian Belle.

Its plot is entirely different from the original play and is set in Russia. This version added new songs not by Romberg.

== Plot ==
New Moon is the name of a ship crossing the Caspian Sea. A young man named Lt. Petroff meets Princess Tanya and they have a ship-board romance. Upon arriving at the port of Krasnov, Petroff learns that Tanya is engaged to Governor Brusiloff.

Petroff, disillusioned, crashes the ball to talk with Tanya. When the couple are found by Brusiloff, they invent a story about her lost bracelet. To reward him, and remove him, Brusiloff sends Petroff to the remote, and deadly, Fort Darvaz. Soon, the big battle against overwhelming odds will begin.

== Cast ==
- Lawrence Tibbett as Lieutenant Michael Petroff
- Grace Moore as Princess Tanya Strogoff
- Adolphe Menjou as Governor Boris Brusiloff
- Roland Young as Count Igor Strogoff
- Gus Shy as Potkin
- Emily Fitzroy as Countess Anastasia Strogoff

== Soundtrack ==
- "Lover, Come Back to Me"

(1928)
Music by Sigmund Romberg
Lyrics by Oscar Hammerstein II
Played during the opening credits
Sung by Lawrence Tibbett at the tavern
Reprised by him and Grace Moore at the fort

- "Farmer's Daughter"

(1930)
Music by Herbert Stothart
Lyrics by Clifford Grey
Played by the band on the ship and sung in a gypsy language by Lawrence Tibbett
Reprised by him with an English translation
Played on piano and sung in the gypsy language by Grace Moore

- "Wanting You"

(1928)
Music by Sigmund Romberg
Lyrics by Oscar Hammerstein II
Sung a cappella by Lawrence Tibbett on the ship
Reprised by him and Grace Moore on the ship

- "One Kiss"

(1928)
Music by Sigmund Romberg
Lyrics by Oscar Hammerstein II
Played on piano (and studio orchestra) and sung by Grace Moore

- "What Is Your Price Madam?"

(1930)
Music by Herbert Stothart
Lyrics by Clifford Grey
Played by the orchestra at the ball and sung by Lawrence Tibbett

- "Stout Hearted Men"

(1928)
Music by Sigmund Romberg
Lyrics by Oscar Hammerstein II
Sung by Lawrence Tibbett and soldiers at the fort
Reprised by the men returning from the battle

== Production ==
The operetta The New Moon opened on Broadway in New York City on September 19, 1928 and closed on December 14, 1929 after 519 performances. The leads were played by Robert Halliday and Evelyn Herbert, and the supporting cast included Gus Shy, who was also in this film.

The production dates were from July 22, 1930 until October 3, 1930.

== Release ==
The film opened at the Astor Theatre in New York City on December 23, 1930.

== Film Connections ==
A second film version of New Moon was remade in 1940 also titled New Moon and the Public Broadcasting Services (PBS) TV Series Great Performances: The New Moon (#17.2)" (1989), are all considered to be based on the stage play The New Moon.

New Moon is featured in the 1954 film Deep in My Heart – the Romberg written production number.
