= Luis Alberni =

American actor (1886–1962)

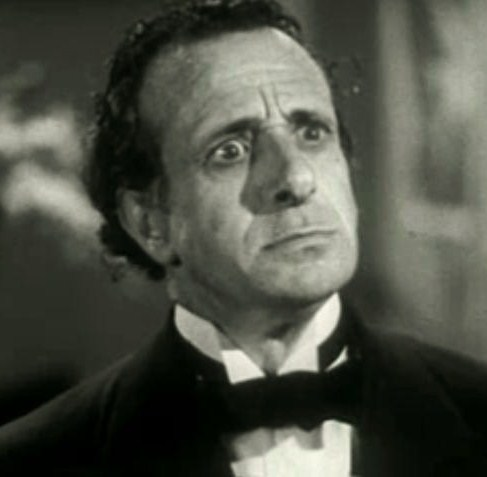
- Alberni in Hats Off (1936)
- Born: October 4, 1886; Barcelona, Spain
- Died: December 23, 1962 (aged 76); Hollywood, California, U.S.
- Resting place: Valhalla Memorial Park Cemetery
- Occupation: Actor
- Years active: 1915–1956
- Spouses: Charlotte Hall Alberni (m. 1919; div. 1940) Wanda Mary Wilson (m. 1940)

Luis Alberni (October 4, 1886 – December 23, 1962) was a Spanish-born American character actor of stage and films.

== Early years ==
Alberni was born in Barcelona, Spain, on October 4, 1886. He acted in stock theater for four years in Marseille before he went back to Barcelona, earned a BA degree, and studied law.

== Career ==
Alberni was acting in Bordeaux when American humorist Wilson Mizner and playwright Paul Armstrong invited him to come to the United States, offering their help. In April 1912, he sailed to New York City as a steerage passenger aboard the S/S Nieuw Amsterdam.

In New York, Alberni acted on both stage and screen. His first motion picture performance was in the 1915 Jewish drama, Children of the Ghetto. On the stage, he appeared in more than a dozen Broadway plays between 1915 and 1928, including 39 East, Dreams for Sale and the original production of What Price Glory? in 1924–1925. In the sound film era, he had notable roles as Jacopo in The Count of Monte Cristo (1934), as Mr. Louis Louis in Easy Living (1937), and as the mayor in A Bell for Adano (1945).

== Personal life and death ==
Alberni and his wife, Charlotte, married on April 18, 1919, in New York City. They were divorced on February 3, 1938. They had three children.

Alberni died at the motion picture actors' home in Woodland Hills, California in 1962. His remains are interred in an unmarked grave at Valhalla Memorial Park Cemetery in North Hollywood.

== Complete filmography ==
- Children of the Ghetto (1915) - Pincus - the Poet
- The Madonna of the Slums (1919, Short)
- 39 East (1920) - Count Gionelli
- Little Italy (1921) - Ricci
- The Man from Beyond (1922) - Captain of the Barkentine
- The Bright Shawl (1923) - Vincente Escobar - Andre's Brother
- The Valley of Lost Souls (1923) - Jacques
- Second Youth (1924) - Greenwich Village Party Guest (uncredited)
- The Cheerful Fraud (1926) - Valet (uncredited)
- The Battle of Paris (1929) - Waiter (uncredited)
- The Santa Fe Trail (1930) - Juan Castinado
- Strange Birds (1930, Short) - The Baron
- One Heavenly Night (1931) - Violinist (uncredited)
- Svengali (1931) - Gecko
- Monkey Business in Africa (1931, Short) - Julius Gonzola
- Sweepstakes (1931) - Cantina Bartender (uncredited)
- Movie-Town (1931, Short) - Baron Gonzola
- Children of Dreams (1931) - (uncredited)
- The Last Flight (1931) - Spectator at Bullfight (uncredited)
- I Like Your Nerve (1931) - Sao Pedro Waiter (uncredited)
- I Surrender Dear (1931, Short) - Marquis
- The Tip-Off (1931) - Scarno - Roadhouse Manager (uncredited)
- The Great Junction Hotel (1931, Short)
- The Mad Genius (1931) - Sergei Bankieff
- Men in Her Life (1931) - Anton
- Manhattan Parade (1931) - Vassily Vassiloff
- Cock of the Air (1932) - Capt. Tonnino
- High Pressure (1932) - Colombo (uncredited)
- The Girl in the Tonneau (1932, Short) - Luis Mazetti
- Stop That Run (1932, Short)
- Hombres de mi vida (1932) - Gaston
- The Cohens and Kellys in Hollywood (1932) - Bladimir Petrosky
- Rule 'Em and Weep (1932, Short) - Anarchist
- The Woman in Room 13 (1932) - Peppi Tonelli
- First in War (1932, Short) - President of the Revolutionary Party of Nicarania
- Week-End Marriage (1932) - Louis - the Bootlegger (uncredited)
- Crooner (1932) - Tamborini (uncredited)
- Two Against the World (1932) - Yelling Courtroom Spectator (uncredited)
- A Parisian Romance (1932) - Pascal
- The Big Stampede (1932) - Sonora Joe
- Trouble in Paradise (1932) - Annoyed Opera Fan (uncredited)
- Guilty or Not Guilty (1932) - Pete
- The Conquerors (1932) - Second Agitator (uncredited)
- The Bride's Bereavement; or, The Snake in the Grass (1932, Short)
- Rasputin and the Empress (1932) - Photographer's Assistant (uncredited)
- Hypnotized (1932) - Hungarian Consul
- Artist's Muddles (1933, Short) - Pietro Cellini
- Child of Manhattan (1933) - Bustamente
- Topaze (1933) - Dr. Bomb
- Men Must Fight (1933) - Soto
- The California Trail (1933) - Commandant Emilio Quierra
- Infernal Machine (1933) - Excitable Italian Passenger (uncredited)
- Trick for Trick (1933) - Metzger
- The Sphinx (1933) - Luigi Baccigalupi
- When Ladies Meet (1933) - Pierre - the Servant
- I Love That Man (1933) - Angelo - Janitor
- The Man from Monterey (1933) - Felipe Guadalupe Constacio Delgado Santa Cruz de la Verranca
- The Last Trail (1933) - Pedro Gonzales
- Sherman Said It (1933, Short) - Frenchman
- Stage Mother (1933) - Hors D'Oeuvres Waiter (uncredited)
- Menu (1933, Short) - The Master Chef (uncredited)
- The Chief (1933) - Man at Alderman Meeting (uncredited)
- Goodbye Love (1933) - Tony
- Havana Widows (1933) - Second Taxi Driver (uncredited)
- Lady Killer (1933) - Director (uncredited)
- Above the Clouds (1933) - Speakeasy Owner
- California Weather (1933, Short)
- By Candlelight (1933) - Train Porter (uncredited)
- Flying Down to Rio (1933) - Rio Casino Manager (uncredited)
- Cold Turkey (1933, Short)
- La ciudad de cartón (1934) - Craig
- When Do We Eat? (1934, Short) - Rigo - Restaurant Owner
- Glamour (1934) - Monsieur Paul
- I Believed in You (1934) - Giacomo
- The Black Cat (1934) - Train Steward (uncredited)
- Strictly Dynamite (1934) - Jake (uncredited)
- Stingaree (1934) - Italian Celebrant (uncredited)
- La buenaventura (1934) - Fresco
- The Count of Monte Cristo (1934) - Jacopo
- One Night of Love (1934) - Giovanni
- When Strangers Meet (1934) - Nick Panaro
- The Captain Hates the Sea (1934) - Juan Gilboa
- Caravane (1934) - Gypsy Chieftain
- The Gilded Lily (1935) - Nate Porcopolis
- The Good Fairy (1935) - The Barber
- The Winning Ticket (1935) - Tony Capucci
- Rendezvous at Midnight (1935) - Janitor
- Roberta (1935) - Alexander Petrovitch Moscovitch Voyda
- Asegure a su mujer (1935) - Bernardo Perry
- Public Opinion (1935) - Caparini
- Let's Live Tonight (1935) - Mario Weems
- Goin' to Town (1935) - Sr. Vitola
- In Caliente (1935) - The Magistrate
- Ticket or Leave It (1935, Short)
- Love Me Forever (1935) - Luigi
- Manhattan Moon (1935) - Luigi
- The Gay Deception (1935) - Ernest
- Metropolitan (1935) - Ugo Pizzi
- Bad Boy (1935) - Tony
- Music Is Music (1935) - Señor Castellano - Cafe Proprietor
- Colleen (1936) - Carlo
- Dancing Pirate (1936) - Pamfilo (the Jailer)
- Ticket to Paradise (1936) - Dr. Munson aka Monte
- Anthony Adverse (1936) - Tony Guisseppi
- Follow Your Heart (1936) - Tony Masetti
- Hats Off (1936) - Rosero
- When You're in Love (1937) - Luis Perugini
- Two Wise Maids (1937) - Guili
- The King and the Chorus Girl (1937) - Gaston
- Sing and Be Happy (1937) - Posini
- Easy Living (1937) - Mr. Louis Louis
- Mr. Dodd Takes the Air (1937) - Bit Part (uncredited)
- Madame X (1937) - Scipio
- The Great Garrick (1937) - Basset
- Under Suspicion (1937) - Luigi
- Manhattan Merry-Go-Round (1937) - Martinetti
- Love on Toast (1937) - Joe Piso
- Hitting a New High (1937) - Luis Marlo
- I'll Give a Million (1938) - Reporter
- The Great Man Votes (1939) - Manos
- Let Freedom Ring (1939) - Tony (uncredited)
- Naughty but Nice (1939) - Stanislaus Pysinski
- The Housekeeper's Daughter (1939) - Veroni
- The Amazing Mr. Williams (1939) - Rinaldo (uncredited)
- High School (1940) - Signor Cicero (uncredited)
- Twincuplets (1940, Short) - Annoyed Opera Fan
- Enemy Agent (1940) - A. Calteroni
- The Lone Wolf Meets a Lady (1940) - Nicolo Pappakontous (uncredited)
- Scatterbrain (1940) - Prof. DeLemma
- Public Deb No. 1 (1940) - Frontenac (uncredited)
- So You Won't Talk (1940) - Barber (uncredited)
- The Lady Eve (1941) - Pike's Chef
- That Hamilton Woman (1941) - King of Naples
- Road to Zanzibar (1941) - Proprietor - Native Booth
- They Met in Argentina (1941) - Don Luis Jose Alfonso Frutos y Murphy (uncredited)
- She Knew All the Answers (1941) - Inventor
- San Antonio Rose (1941) - Nick Ferris
- They Met in Bombay (1941) - Maitre d'hotel
- World Premiere (1941) - Signor Scaletti
- Babes on Broadway (1941) - Nick
- Obliging Young Lady (1942) - Riccardi
- I Married an Angel (1942) - Jean Frederique (uncredited)
- Mexican Spitfire's Elephant (1942) - Luigi
- Northwest Rangers (1942) - Jacques (uncredited)
- Two Weeks to Live (1943) - Van Dyke / Dr. Jekyll (uncredited)
- My Son, the Hero (1943) - Tony
- Submarine Base (1943) - Mr. Styx
- The Man from Down Under (1943) - Dino Piza (uncredited)
- Here Comes Kelly (1943) - Nick
- You're a Lucky Fellow, Mr. Smith (1943) - Goreni
- Nearly Eighteen (1943) - Gus
- Here Comes Elmer (1943) - Dr. Zichy
- Harvest Melody (1943) - Cafe Manager
- Men on Her Mind (1944) - Alberti Verdi
- Voice in the Wind (1944) - Bartender
- It Happened Tomorrow (1944) - Restaurant Owner (uncredited)
- Henry Aldrich Plays Cupid (1944) - Tony (uncredited)
- In Society (1944) - Luigi - Pottery Dealer (uncredited)
- Machine Gun Mama (1944) - Ignacio
- Rainbow Island (1944) - Jerry - Native with Laundry (uncredited)
- The Conspirators (1944) - Prison Guard (uncredited)
- When the Lights Go On Again (1944) - Joe
- The Captain from Köpenick (1945) - Prison Guard
- Wonder Man (1945) - Opera Prompter (uncredited)
- A Bell for Adano (1945) - Cacopardo
- Hit the Hay (1945) - French Professor (uncredited)
- In Fast Company (1946) - Tony - Fruit Vendor
- Double Rhythm (1946, Short) - Mr. Palucci
- Night Song (1946) - Flower Vendor (scenes deleted)
- When Willie Comes Marching Home (1950) - Barman (uncredited)
- Captain Carey, U.S.A. (1950) - Sandro
- What Price Glory? (1952) - Grand Uncle (uncredited)
- The Ten Commandments (1956) - Old Hebrew at Moses' House (uncredited) (final film role)
