= Broadway Fever =

1929 film

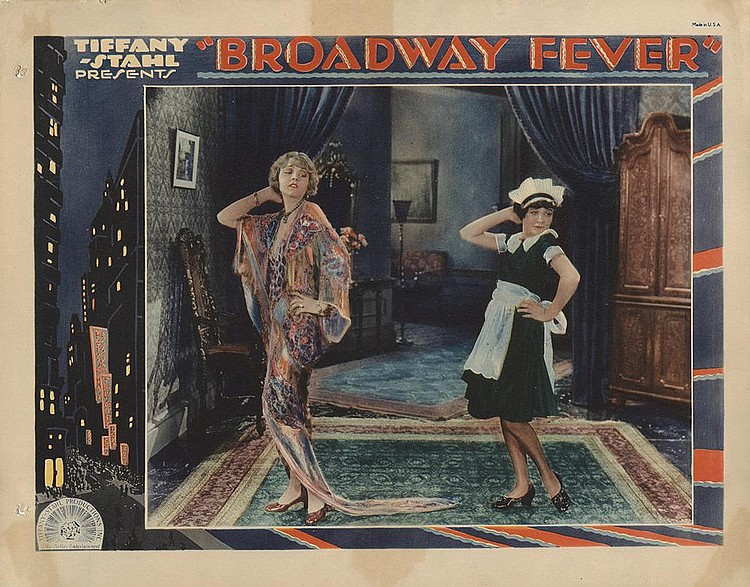
- Directed by: Edward F. Cline
- Written by: Fanny Hatton; Frederic Hatton; Lois Leeson; Paul Perez; Viola Brothers Shore
- Produced by: John M. Stahl
- Starring: Sally O'Neil; Roland Drew; Corliss Palmer
- Cinematography: John W. Boyle
- Edited by: Byron Robinson
- Production company: Tiffany Pictures
- Distributed by: Tiffany Pictures
- Release date: January 1, 1929
- Running time: 6 reels
- Country: United States
- Languages: Silent; English intertitles

Broadway Fever is a 1929 American silent comedy film directed by Edward F. Cline and starring Sally O'Neil, Roland Drew and Corliss Palmer. It is now considered a lost film.

== Cast ==
- Sally O'Neil as Sally McAllister
- Roland Drew as Eric Byron
- Corliss Palmer as Lila Leroy
- Calvert Carter as Butler

== Bibliography ==
- Pitts, Michael R. Poverty Row Studios, 1929–1940: An Illustrated History of 55 Independent Film Companies, with a Filmography for Each. McFarland & Company, 2005.
