= George Washington Cohen =

1928 film

- Directed by: George Archainbaud
- Written by: Isadore Bernstein
- Based on: The Cherry Tree by Aaron Hoffman
- Produced by: John M. Stahl
- Starring: George Jessel; Robert Edeson; Corliss Palmer
- Cinematography: Harry Jackson
- Edited by: Robert Kern
- Production company: Tiffany Pictures
- Distributed by: Tiffany Pictures
- Release date: December 20, 1928
- Running time: 62 minutes
- Country: United States
- Languages: Silent; English intertitles

George Washington Cohen is a 1928 American silent comedy drama film directed by George Archainbaud and starring George Jessel, Robert Edeson and Corliss Palmer. It was based on a vaudeville sketch The Cherry Tree by Aaron Hoffman. It was produced and released by Tiffany Pictures during John M. Stahl's period as head of production for the studio. It is now considered a lost film.

== Synopsis ==
A naïve young man discovers a wallet in the street and returns it to its owner, wealthy Wall Street banker Gorman. Gorman is so impressed with his honesty that he gives the man, George Washington Cohen, a well-paid job. However, due to his inherent honesty Cohen feels duty bound to inform Gorman when he discovers his wife is having an affair. Gorman sues for divorce, and calls Cohen as the lead witness. However he has a change of heart and at last is able to tell a lie so that the Gormans will stay together for the sake of their children.

== Cast ==
- George Jessel as George Washington Cohen
- Robert Edeson as Mr. Gorman
- Corliss Palmer as Mrs. Gorman
- Lawford Davidson as Mr. Connolly
- Florence Allen as Marian
- Jane La Verne as Child
- Paul Panzer
- Edna Mae Cooper

== Censorship ==
Before George Washington Cohen could be exhibited in Kansas, the Kansas Board of Review required the removal of a scene about circumcision and two "Jewish titles."

== Bibliography ==
- Goble, Alan. The Complete Index to Literary Sources in Film. Walter de Gruyter, 1999.
- Munden, Kenneth White. The American Film Institute Catalog of Motion Pictures Produced in the United States, Part 1. University of California Press, 1997.
