= The Duchess of Buffalo =

1926 film

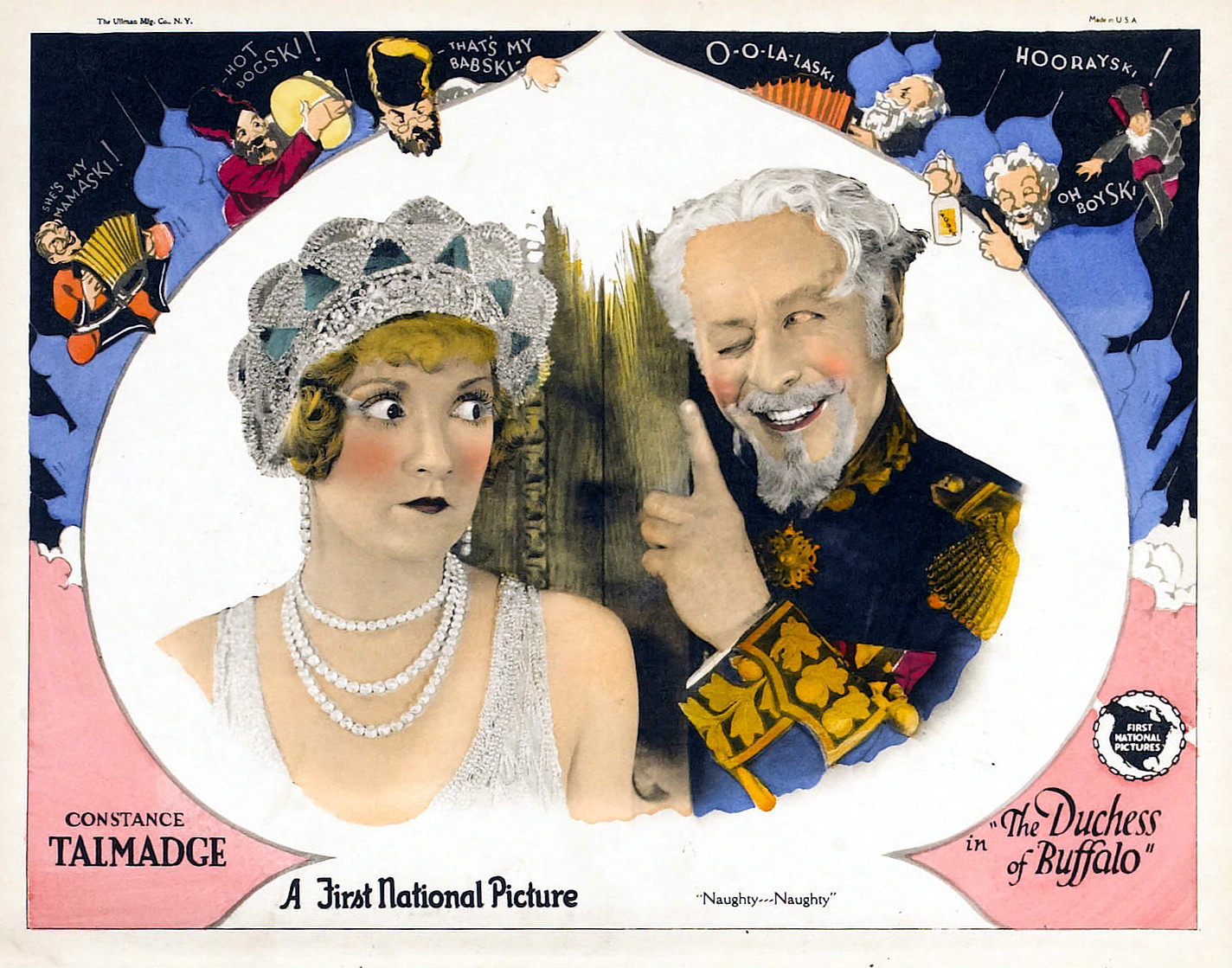
- Lobby card with Constance Talmadge and Edward Martindel
- Directed by: Sidney Franklin
- Written by: Hanns Kräly (scenario, adaptation); George Marion Jr. (intertitles)
- Based on: Sybil by Max Brody and Franz Martos
- Produced by: Constance Talmadge; Joseph M. Schenck
- Starring: Constance Talmadge
- Cinematography: Oliver T. Marsh
- Edited by: Hal C. Kern
- Distributed by: First National Pictures
- Release date: September 5, 1926
- Running time: 75 minutes; 7 reels (6,940 feet)
- Country: United States
- Language: Silent (English intertitles)

The Duchess of Buffalo is a 1926 American silent romantic comedy film, produced by and starring Constance Talmadge, alongside Joseph M. Schenck, and released through First National Pictures. It is based on the 1916 Broadway stage musical Sybil, which is this film's alternate title.

Set in pre-revolutionary Russia, the plot follows Marian Duncan, an American dancer, who catches the attention of a dashing army officer, Vladimir Orloff. Their budding romance is overshadowed when the Grand Duke, Orloff’s commanding officer, becomes infatuated with Marian, leading to a series of farcical misadventures. Mistaken identities and romantic confusion ensue amid snowy hotel corridors and grand fashion, which created a perfect platform for Talmadge’s wit and expressive performance

Critics of the era praised Talmadge’s sparkling presence and graceful comedy. Photoplay described the film as “brisk, racy and lightly amusing”, highlighting its spirited pacing and condescending rival from royalty. The Picture-Play review noted its Continental flair and refined humour, calling it “civilised entertainment at its best,” and commending Sidney Franklin’s direction for being both tasteful and well-suited to Talmadge’s strengths.

== Cast ==
- Constance Talmadge as Marian Duncan
- Tullio Carminati as Lt. Vladimir Orloff
- Edward Martindel as Grand Duke Gregory Alexandrovich
- Rose Dione as Grand Duchess Olga Petrovna
- Chester Conklin as Hotel Manager
- Lawrence Grant as The Commandant
- Martha Franklin as The Maid
- Jean De Briac as Adjutant
- Ellinor Vanderveer as Lady in Waiting (uncredited)
