= Tullio Carminati =

Dalmatian Italian actor (1894–1971)

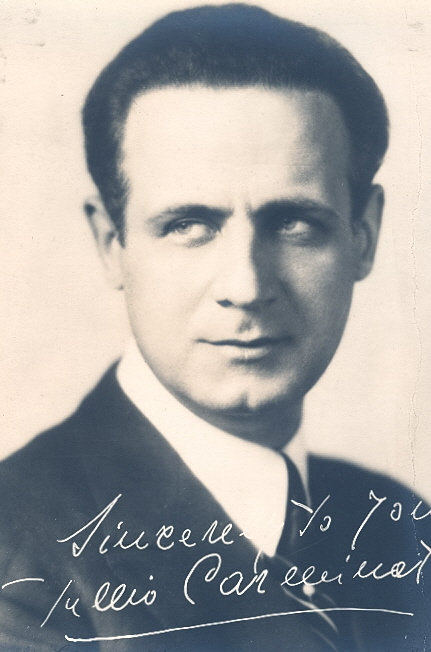
- Carminati in 1924
- Born: 21 September 1894; Zadar, Kingdom of Dalmatia, Austria-Hungary
- Died: 26 February 1971 (aged 76); Rome, Italy
- Occupation: Actor
- Years active: 1915–1963

Tullio Carminati (21 September 1894 – 26 February 1971) was a Dalmatian Italian actor.

He rose to fame in Italy and the United States initially as a silent film actor, starring in such films as The Duchess of Buffalo (1926), The Bat (1926), Honeymoon Hate (1927), and Three Sinners (1928) alongside Pola Negri. Carminati went on to star in Stage Madness (1927), One Night of Love (1934), Let's Live Tonight (1935), Paris in Spring (1935) and Three Maxims (1936). In the latter part of his career he starred in such movies as Beauty and the Devil (1950), Roman Holiday (1953), War and Peace (1956), A Breath of Scandal (1960), El Cid (1961), and The Cardinal (1963).

Beside his film roles, Carminati starred in several plays, including Joan of Arc at the Stake (which was later adapted into Rossellini's movie of the same name) and Broadway productions Strictly Dishonorable and Music in the Air.

== Biography ==
Carminati was born into a Dalmatian Italian family in Zadar (in modern-day Croatia), then belonging to the Austro-Hungarian Empire.

After achieving his first successes on the theatrical scene with the companies of Ettore Paladini and Ermete Novelli, he had the opportunity to make his debut in the world of cinema, around 1914, thanks to his elegant and refined presence.

He took part in about thirty silent films before founding his own production house in the late 1910s.

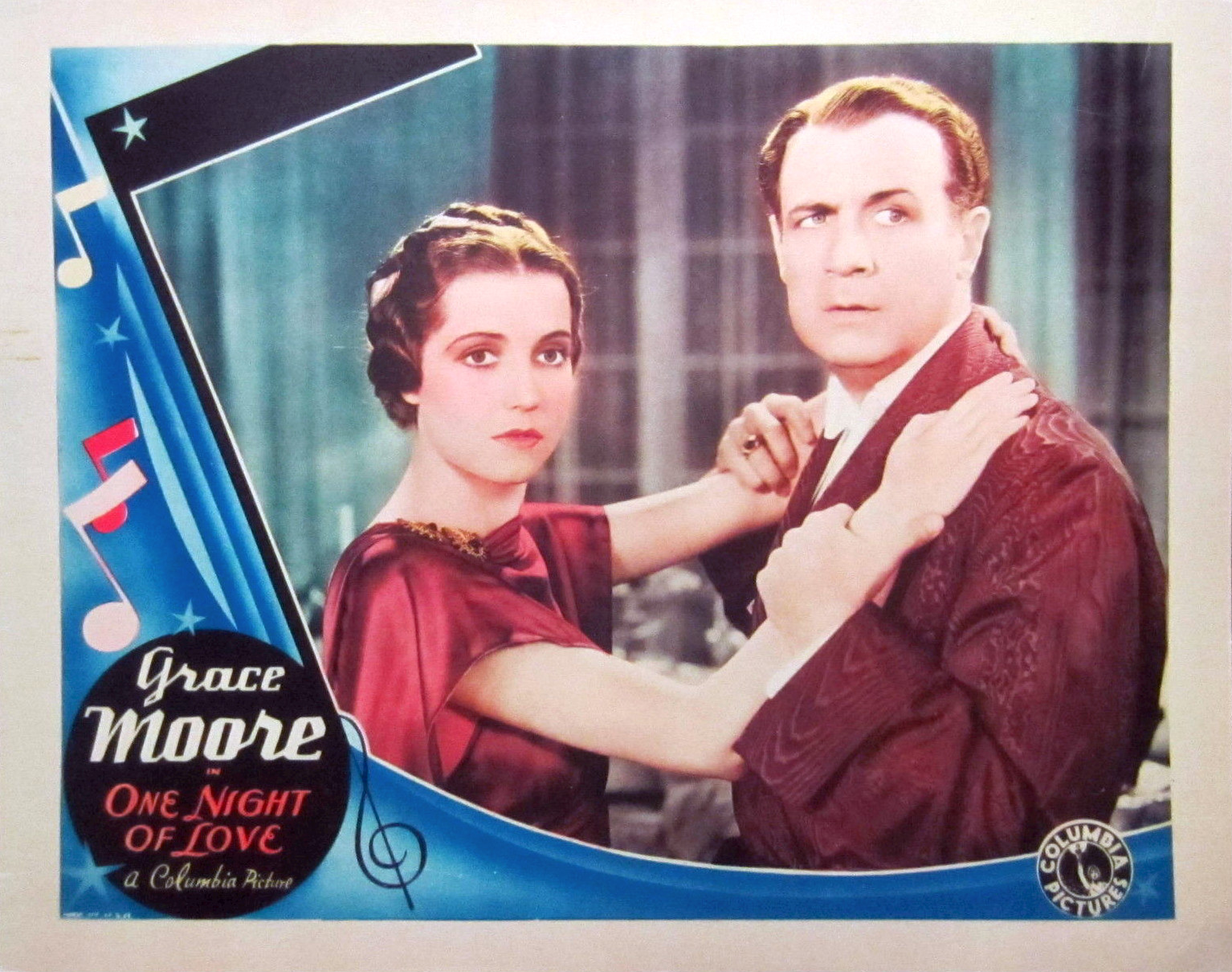
Carminati and Grace Moore in One Night of Love (1934)

In 1921 he obtained enough popularity, thanks to his interpretation in The Lady with the Camellias (from the novel of the same name by Alexandre Dumas) alongside Alda Borelli, to induce the diva Eleonora Duse to offer him the direction of her company.

He staged Duse's last performances, including The Lady from the Sea written by Henrik Ibsen and The Closed Door by Emilio Praga.

During the year 1924, he moved to Germany and two years later to the United States, where he continued his career with some success until 1940. During the United States period, he made a single participation in an Italian-French production in 1934.

In America he participated in the 725 performances of the comedy Strictly Dishonorable, being acclaimed for his role as "Latin lover". In this period he also devoted himself to musical comedies, thus also performing as a singer. In 1932 he was Bruno Mahler in the world premiere of Jerome Kern's Music in the Air at Broadway's Alvin Theater, with Al Shean, Walter Slezak and Marjorie Main, reprising the role in the 1933 premiere at Broadway's 44th Street Theatre.

After the beginning of the hostilities of the Second World War, he returned to Italy, where he was most active from that moment, although he continued to participate in French, Spanish and American productions.

His films of the latter period include l'Antigone (1946), directed by Luchino Visconti, and René Clair's Beauté du diable (1950).

In 1953 he starred as Saint Dominic in Joan of Arc at the Stake alongside Ingrid Bergman, Marcella Pobbe, Miriam Pirazzini, Agnese Dubbini, Giacinto Prandelli and Piero De Palma at the San Carlo Theater in Naples. In 1954, the oratorio was adapted into a movie directed by Roberto Rossellini.

He died in Rome on 26 February 1971.

== Selected filmography ==
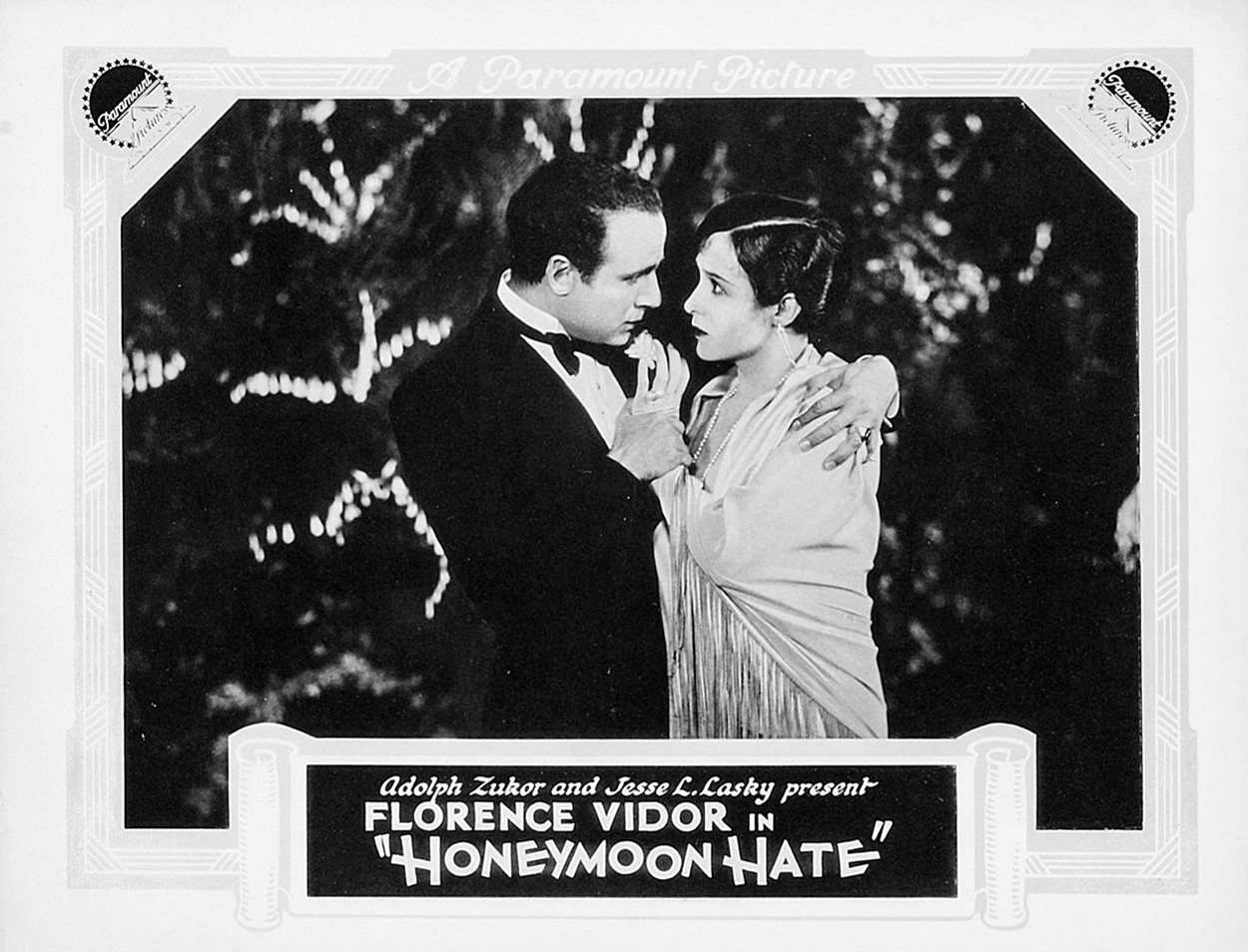
Carminati in Honeymoon Hate (1927)

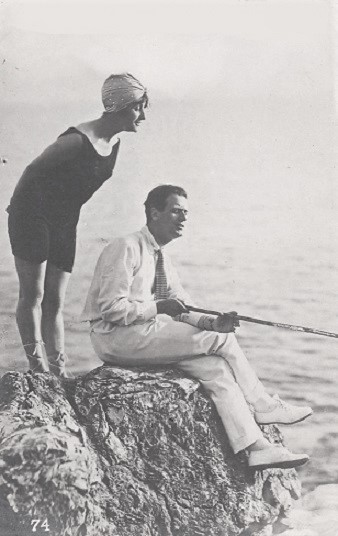
Carminati in La menzogna (1918)

- La mia vita per la tua! (1914)
- Romanticismo (1915)
- La collana della felicità (1916)
- Il dossier n. 7 (1916)
- Val d'olivi (1916)
- Il presagio (1916)
- La donna di cuori (1917)
- L'aigrette (1917) - Enrico di Saint Servant
- La via della luce (1917)
- La donna abbandonata (1917)
- Kalidaa - la storia di una mummia (1917)
- Il volto del passato (1918)
- La via più lunga (1918)
- La menzogna (1918)
- L'articolo IV (1918)
- Il trono e la seggiola (1918)
- Madame Flirt (1918)
- La fibra del dolore (1919)
- Vertigine (1919)
- La signora senza pace (1919)
- Bimbi lontani (1919)
- La perfetta ebbrezza (1920)
- Amore stanco (1920)
- La bambola e l'amore (1920)
- Il rivale (1920)
- Follie (1920)
- Raffiche (1920)
- Il segreto (1920)
- Al di là della vita (1920)
- Tatiana, la danzatrice polacca (1921)
- Mirtil (1921)
- La principessa d'azzurro (1922)
- La belle Madame Hebért (1922)
- La duchessa Mistero (1922)
- International gran prix (1924)
- Man Against Man (1924)
- The Bat (1926) - Detective Moletti
- The Duchess of Buffalo (1926) - Vladimir Orloff
- Stage Madness (1927) - Andrew Marlowe
- Honeymoon Hate (1927) - Prince Dantarini
- Three Sinners (1928) - Raoul Stanislav
- The Patriot (1928) - Minor Role (uncredited)
- Gallant Lady (1933) - Count Mario Carniri
- Moulin Rouge (1934) - Victor Le Maire
- One Night of Love (1934) - Giulio Monteverdi
- The Wedding March (1934) - Ruggero Lechatelier
- Let's Live Tonight (1935) - Nick 'Monte' Kerry
- Paris in Spring (1935) - Paul d'Orlando
- Three Maxims (1936) - Toni
- London Melody (1937) - Marius Andreani
- Sunset in Vienna (1937) - Capt. Antonio 'Toni' Baretti
- Safari (1940) - Baron de Courtland
- La vita torna (1943) - Gino Graziolli
- Fatal Symphony (1947)
- L'apocalisse (1947)
- The Charterhouse of Parma (1948) - Le comte Mosca, le premier ministre
- Golden Madonna (1949) - Signor Migone
- Beauty and the Devil (1950) - Le Diplomate
- Gli uomini non guardano il cielo (1952) - Cardinal Merry del Val
- Roman Holiday (1953) - General Provno
- Giovanna d'Arco al rogo (1954) - Fra' Domenico
- Good Bye, Sevilla (1955)
- War and Peace (1956) - Prince Vasili Kuragin
- Io Caterina (1957)
- A Breath of Scandal (1960) - Albert
- El Cid (1961) - Priest
- Hemingway's Adventures of a Young Man (1962) - Rosanna's Father
- Swordsman of Siena (1962) - Father Giacomo
- The Cardinal (1963) - Cardinal Giacobbi (final film role)

== Bibliography ==
- Roberta Ascarelli, CARMINATI, Tullio, in Dizionario biografico degli italiani, vol. 34, Roma, Istituto dell'Enciclopedia Italiana, 1988.
- V. Bernardoni, Dizionario degli attori contemporanei, Milan.
- R. Simoni, Trent'anni di critica drammatica, Turin, 1951.
- N. Leonelli, Attori tragici, attori comici, Milan, 1940.
- Don Marzio, Tullio Carminati, uno che rientra nei ranghi, in Scenario, XII, 1943, pp. 247–249.
