= Bromo and Juliet =

1926 film

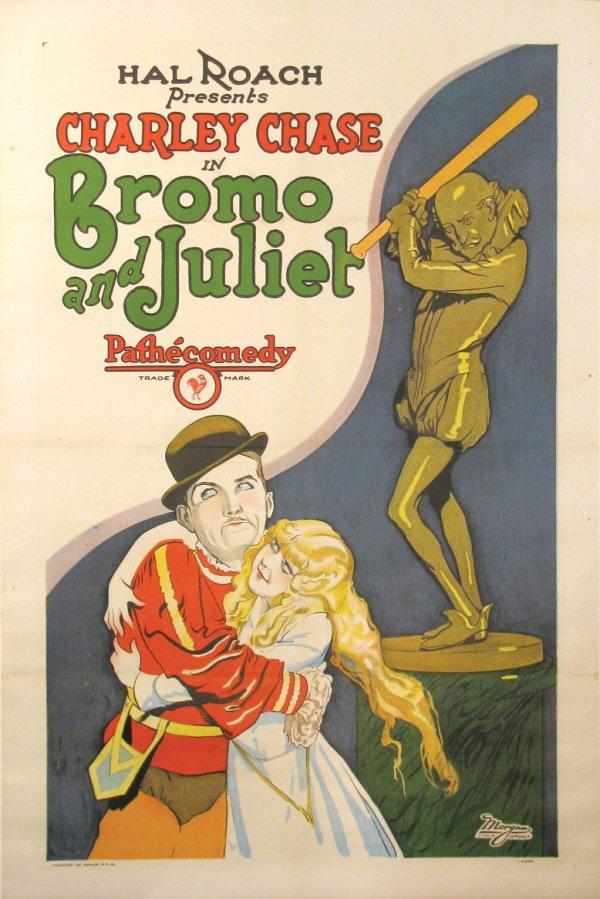
- Film poster
- Directed by: Leo McCarey
- Written by: Charles Alphin; H. M. Walker
- Produced by: Hal Roach
- Starring: Charley Chase
- Cinematography: Len Powers
- Edited by: Richard C. Currier
- Distributed by: Pathé Exchange
- Release date: September 19, 1926
- Running time: 24 minutes
- Country: United States
- Language: Silent (English intertitles)

Bromo and Juliet is a 1926 American silent comedy film directed by Leo McCarey starring Charley Chase with an appearance by Oliver Hardy.

== Plot ==
A group of people debate what type of show to put on in their theatre. Charley suggests a horse show. His prospective father-in-law suggests a dance show with girls. However Charley's fiancée Madge is already rehearsing Romeo and Juliet. This seems to involve her being manhandled in the next room. Charley goes through and punches a man throttling her. She explains it is her stage manager.

She agrees to marry him as long as he plays Romeo in the play. He looks shocked. He refuses but next we see him dressed as Romeo. He is advised that his legs look too thin and he pads them with bathroom sponges to look more muscular. He dons an overcoat to head to the theatre.

Meanwhile Madge's father is rehearsing Richard III and is a bit drunk: a horsh, a horsh … Charley collects him and they head outside to catch a cab. The cab driver refuses to go anywhere until the father pays him $40 already owed. The father writes a cheque but it just says Merry Christmas and a Happy New Year and is signed W. Shakespeare. Charley apologises whilst the father goes into a barber for a shave. The drunken father leaves the barber and smashes the showroom window of a bathroom shop to start to shave. A crowd gathers: he is having a bath in the shop window. They get him out but the cabbie still wants $40. Charley decides to sell the father's case of whiskey (which was already in the cab). He has to hide it (as prohibition is still in force). When he tries to sell it a man draws a pistol and forces the bootlegger to "drink his own poison".

He returns to the cab still with the case of whiskey but very drunk. He wanders the street trying to sell it to strangers. He tries to avoid the policeman at the crossing seeing the case. Nevertheless he gets arrested. He escapes the police by running through a grass sprinkler system. This swells up the sponges in his leggings. He jumps on a bus and goes to the open upper deck. When he sits the water starts to pour out and soaks a man below, but when he goes to complain he presumes it is the small child with Charley.

Back at the cab the father lets a tyre down to distract the driver then runs off.

Both Charley and father arrive at the theatre in time for the balcony scene from Romeo and Juliet. A policeman follows Charley onto stage then realises what he has done. He sidles off as the crowd clap. Charley is too drunk and the audience laugh more. When Juliet leaves the balcony and is replaced by the policeman Charley drops off in shock. The audience query one another as to what is happening.

The policeman waits in one wing and the cab driver in the other. Charley escapes through the stage trap door. The next act comes on stage: the Great Brandenburg, a magic show. He makes his assistant disappear and Charley appears in her place. Both men are puzzled but the audience clap. He turns the trick box around and reveals the missing assistant. Next Charley materialises in the ghost scene from Hamlet, sleeping on the rising moon. He borrows Banquo's sheet and staggers over stage followed by the policeman also dressed as a ghost.

Four sailors go on stage for a song and dance act and Charley joins the end of the line. The sailors go offstage but the set begins to sway and Charley sways with it. He is dragged off.

Backstage the cabbie is eventually given the $40 from the father. Charley is congratulated by Madge and the cast for being able to "act" drunk so well. The crowd call out for Romeo. Romeo goes out to take a bow with the policeman.

== Cast ==
- Charley Chase as Charley (Romeo)
- Corliss Palmer as Madge (Juliet)
- William Orlamond as Madge's Father
- Oliver Hardy as Cab Driver
- L. J. O'Connor as The Cop
- Sammy Brooks as Undetermined Secondary Role (uncredited)
- William Gillespie as The Great Brandenburg, stage magician (uncredited)
- Helen Gilmore as Undetermined Secondary Role (uncredited)
- Charlie Hall as Stagehand (uncredited)
- Fred Kelsey as The Detective (uncredited)
- Rolfe Sedan as Stage Manager (uncredited)
- Martha Sleeper as Undetermined Secondary Role (uncredited)
- Ellinor Vanderveer as Lady on Bus (uncredited)

== Preservation ==
A print of the film survives in the film archive at the Library of Congress and the film has been released as part of a collection on dvd. A clip from the film was used in the credits of the 1968 film The Night They Raided Minsky's.

== See also ==
- List of American films of 1926
