= Nearly Eighteen =

1943 film directed by Arthur Dreifuss

- Directed by: Arthur Dreifuss
- Screenplay by: George Wallace Sayre
- Story by: Margaret Englander
- Produced by: Lindsley Parsons
- Starring: Gale Storm; Rick Vallin; William Henry; Luis Alberni; Ralph Hodges; Jerry Rush
- Cinematography: Mack Stengler
- Edited by: Richard C. Currier
- Music by: Edward J. Kay
- Production company: Monogram Pictures
- Distributed by: Monogram Pictures
- Release date: November 12, 1943
- Running time: 61 minutes
- Country: United States
- Language: English

Nearly Eighteen is a 1943 American comedy film directed by Arthur Dreifuss and written by George Wallace Sayre. The film stars Gale Storm, Rick Vallin, William Henry, Luis Alberni, Ralph Hodges and Jerry Rush. The film was released on November 12, 1943, by Monogram Pictures.

== Plot ==
Jane 'Janie' Stanton (Gale Storm) on the verge of turning 18 finds that she can't afford the tuition to attend a "renowned singing and dancing school". In an effort to realize her dreams Stanton devises a plan to take advantage of an age related loophole. She discovers that the school will offer enrolment free of charge if a student is under the age of 15. Stanton goes about transforming herself into a much younger student in order to attend the school.

== Cast ==
- Gale Storm as Jane Stanton
- Rick Vallin as Tony Morgan
- William Henry as Jack Leonard
- Luis Alberni as Gus
- Ralph Hodges as Tom
- Jerry Rush as Dick
- George O'Hanlon as Eddie
- Bebe Fox as Harriet
- Robert Homans as Judge
- Sarah Edwards as Miss Perkins
- Kenneth Harlan as Sammy Klein
- Donald Kerr as Harry
