= A Lady's Morals =

1930 film by Sidney Franklin

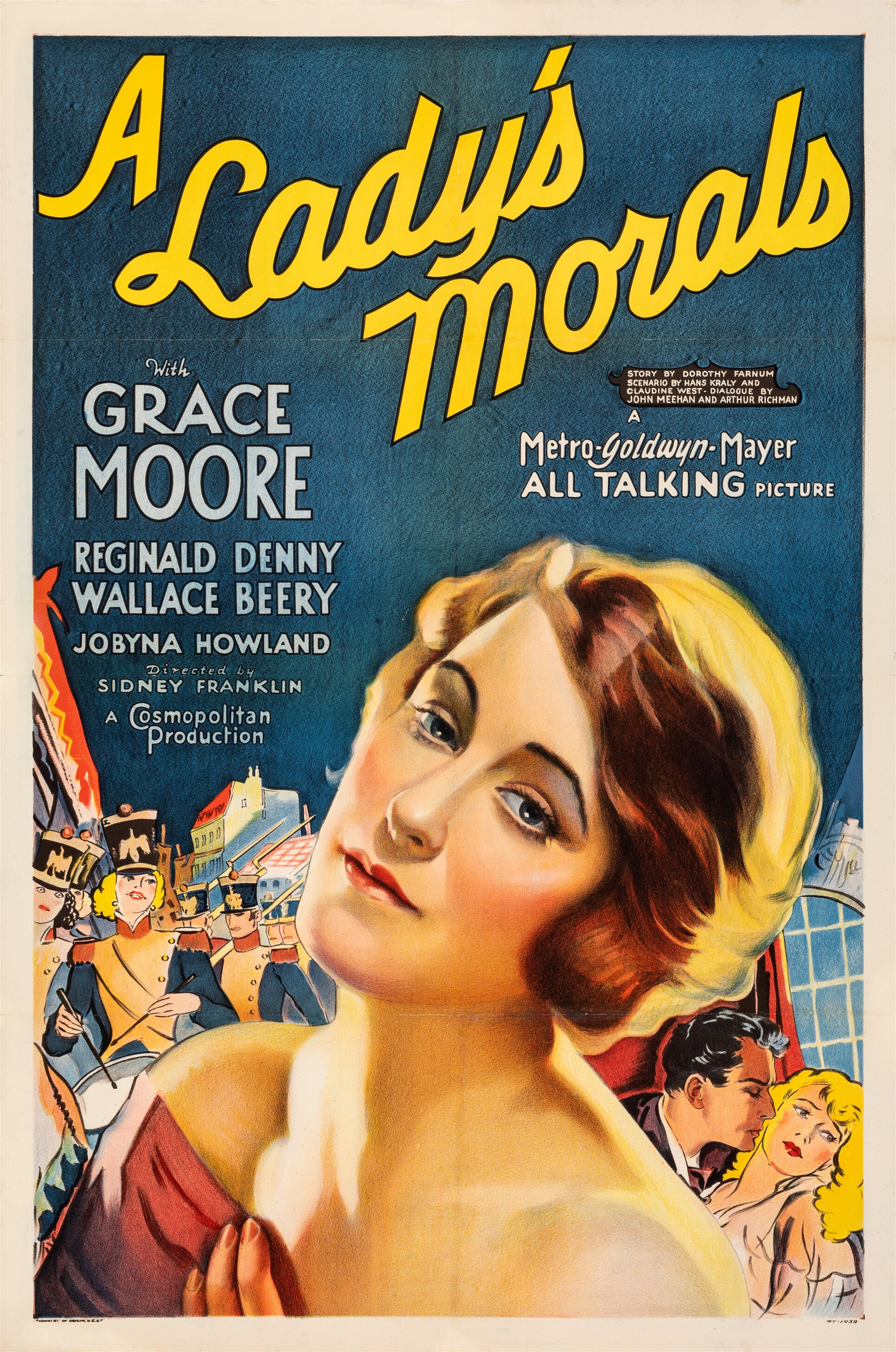
- Directed by: Sidney Franklin
- Written by: Dorothy Farnum; Hanns Kräly; John Meehan; Arthur Richman; Claudine West
- Produced by: Irving Thalberg
- Starring: Grace Moore; Reginald Denny; Wallace Beery; Gilbert Emery
- Cinematography: George Barnes
- Edited by: Margaret Booth
- Music by: Vincenzo Bellini
- Distributed by: Metro-Goldwyn-Mayer
- Release date: November 8, 1930
- Running time: 87 minutes
- Country: United States
- Language: English

A Lady's Morals is a 1930 American pre-Code film directed by Sidney Franklin. Its plot is a highly fictionalized love story of opera singer Jenny Lind. The film features Grace Moore as Lind, Reginald Denny as her admirer and Wallace Beery as P. T. Barnum. It contains operatic arias by Moore.

Wallace Beery reprise his role as Barnum four years later in The Mighty Barnum (1934), with Virginia Bruce portraying Jenny Lind.

== Plot ==
Paul Brandt is a young American composer who falls in love with the Swedish opera singer Jenny Lind. She is not interested in him, despite his attending her European concerts. One evening, Jenny loses her voice while performing the opera Norma. During the uproar in the concert hall, Paul sustains a head trauma, gradually destroying his vision

Paul is able to convince the distraught Jenny to a therapist who restores her voice. She returns with Paul to Sweden and is being to have feelings for him. However, when she finally understands that Paul is going blind, he leaves her without explanation. Months later, she making her American debut at the Castle Garden Theater in New York City, under the direction of P. T. Barnum. She is happily reunited with Paul, now totally blind who had been living as an itinerant musician.

A Lady's Morals (1930)

== Cast ==
- Grace Moore as Jenny Lind
- Reginald Denny as Paul Brandt
- Wallace Beery as P. T. Barnum
- Jobyna Howland as Josephine
- Gus Shy as Olaf
- Gilbert Emery as Broughm
- George F. Marion as Innkeeper
- Paul Porcasi as Innkeeper
- Karl Dane as Swede in Audience (uncredited)

== Soundtrack ==
The real Jenny Lind

- "It Is Destiny": Lyrics by Clifford Grey, music by Oscar Straus, played by Reginald Denny on piano and sung by Grace Moore
- "Rataplan" (from La fille du régiment): Music by Gaetano Donizetti, sung by Moore
- "Student's Song": Music by Oscar Straus, lyrics by Clifford Grey, sung by students escorting Jenny home
- "Oh Why": Lyrics by Arthur Freed, music by Herbert Stothart and Harry M. Woods, played by Moore singing and on piano
- "Casta Diva" (from Norma): Music by Vincenzo Bellini, played at an opera house and sung by Moore
- "Swedish Pastorale": Written by Howard Johnson and Herbert Stothart, sung by a group in Sweden
- "Lovely Hour": Words and music by Carrie Jacobs-Bond, sung first by Moore off-screen and reprised at P. T. Barnum's show in New York
- "I Hear Your Voice": Music by Oscar Straus, lyrics by Clifford Grey

== Reception ==
In a contemporary review for The New York Times, critic Mordaunt Hall called the film's title "meaningless and unsuitable" and wrote:

"This story, one of half-truths and fiction, ... is a conventional narrative and although Mr. Franklin delivers some imaginatively conceived sequences, there are others that are emphatically old fashioned in design. ... It is too mindful of the old things in motion pictures."

== Remake ==
A Lady's Morals was remade as the 1932 American French-language film titled Jenny Lind.

== See also ==
Jenny Lind
