= Fan magazine =

A fan magazine is a commercially written and published magazine intended for the amusement of fans of the popular culture subject matter that it covers. It is distinguished from a scholarly, literary or trade magazine on the one hand, by the target audience of its contents, and from a fanzine on the other, by the commercial and for-profit nature of its production and distribution. Scholarly works on popular culture and fandoms do not always make this terminological distinction clear. In some relevant works, fanzines are called "fan magazines", possibly because the term "fanzine" is seen as slang.

American examples include Photoplay, Motion Picture Magazine, Modern Screen, Sports Illustrated and Cinefantastique.

== Film fan magazines ==
=== Content ===
The film fan magazines focused on promoting films and movie stars in a certain way, and in exchange for this control, the studios would purchase plentiful advertisements.

Well known gossip columnists like Hedda Hopper, Walter Winchell, and Louella Parsons, among others, were published in various fan magazines. Readers of the fan magazines enjoyed reading about their favorite celebrities in "candid" articles supposedly penned by the stars themselves, even though they were most likely written by press agents and usually served to defend recent behavior or deflect rumors. The reporting on stars in this period by Photoplay and others was often positive due to the studios' influence over the publications.

== Motion Picture Magazine ==
Regarded as the first fan magazine, Motion Picture Magazine was established in 1911 by Vitagraph Studios co-founder J. Stuart Blackton and partner Eugene V. Brewster under the title The Motion Picture Story Magazine. In contrast to earlier film magazines such as The Moving Picture World, which were aimed at film exhibitors, The Motion Picture Story Magazine was aimed at regular film goers.

The magazine was very successful from its inception, with an initial run of 50,000 copies and a circulation of 200,000 by 1914. Writers were amazed at the outset to receive their checks for contributions almost immediately on acceptance, a policy on the part of Brewster that was effective in quickly inducing the highest grade fiction authors to become affiliated with the publication. Contributors included Rex Beach, Will Carleton and Horatio C. King.

== Photoplay ==
Photoplay was one of the first American film fan magazines. Founded in Chicago in 1911 by Macfadden Publications, Photoplay was founded the same year as Stuart Blackton's Motion Picture Story, a similar publication. Photoplay, as one of the first and most popular fan magazines, is credited as the originator of celebrity media. Photoplay was published from 1911 until 1980, at several points merging with other publications.

Other fan magazines include Modern Screen and Cinefantastique.

== Confidential ==
Confidential was founded in 1952 by Robert Harrison and published until 1978.

More of a tabloid than a fan magazines because of its salacious content and irreverent celebrity gossip. Unlike other fan magazines, Confidential did not cooperate with the studios allowing for more scandalous content. Contrary to its reputation for double-checking its facts, the magazine knowingly published unverified allegations which opened themselves up to libel suits.

== See also ==
- Fanzine
