= One Night of Love =

1934 film

- Theatrical release poster
- Directed by: Victor Schertzinger
- Written by: Charles Beahan (story); Dorothy Speare (story); James Gow; S.K. Lauren; Edmund H. North
- Produced by: Harry Cohn
- Starring: Grace Moore; Tullio Carminati; Lyle Talbot
- Cinematography: Joseph Walker
- Edited by: Gene Milford
- Music by: Alfred Newman; Victor Schertzinger; Louis Silvers; Howard Jackson
- Distributed by: Columbia Pictures
- Release date: September 5, 1934
- Running time: 83 minutes
- Country: United States
- Languages: English; Italian
- Budget: $500,000
- Box office: $2,500,000 (worldwide rentals)

One Night of Love is a 1934 American Columbia Pictures romantic musical film set in the opera world, starring Grace Moore and Tullio Carminati. The film was directed by Victor Schertzinger and adapted from the story Don't Fall in Love, by Charles Beahan and Dorothy Speare.

In the relatively new use of sound recordings for film, One Night of Love was noted at the time for its innovative use of vertical cut recording, for which Columbia Pictures received an Academy Scientific and Technical Award. It also won the academy's first Award for Best Original Score.

== Plot ==
Opera singer Mary Barrett (Grace Moore) leaves to study music in Milan, Italy to the disappointment of her family in New York City. Mary gets a job at the Cafe Roma, where Giulio Monteverdi (Tullio Carminati), a famous vocal coach, hears her sing. Giulio promises to make Mary a star if she will allow him to control her life. He also tells her that there cannot be any romance between the two of them, as that would distract from the process of growing her talent. Mary discovers she has stagefright as she prepares for a tour of provincial opera houses, however Giulio helps her overcome it.

Years later, still under Giulio's tutelage, Mary begins to tire of his dominance and discipline. The two meet one of Giulio's old pupils, Lally (Mona Barrie), while in Vienna. Lally once tried to be romantic with Giulio, but was rejected. This past history renders Mary jealous and she pretends to have laryngitis. Mary thinks Giulio has gone to Lally to rekindle a romance, and so visits Bill Houston (Lyle Talbot), a longtime friend who has proposed marriage. In a jealous huff, Mary decides not to sing that night in order to punish Giulio. Giulio realizes what is going on and tells Mary that Lally will replace her on stage, but then proposes to Mary.

She decides to go on, and Mary's performance of Bizet's Carmen wins her an invitation to the Metropolitan Opera, her dream venue. Giulio, however, still does not believe that she is ready for such a venue. Later at dinner, Lally lies to Mary by telling her that she is still involved with Giulio. On the night of her debut in Madame Butterfly, Mary is too nervous to go on stage until she sees Giulio in his usual place in the prompter's box.

== Cast ==
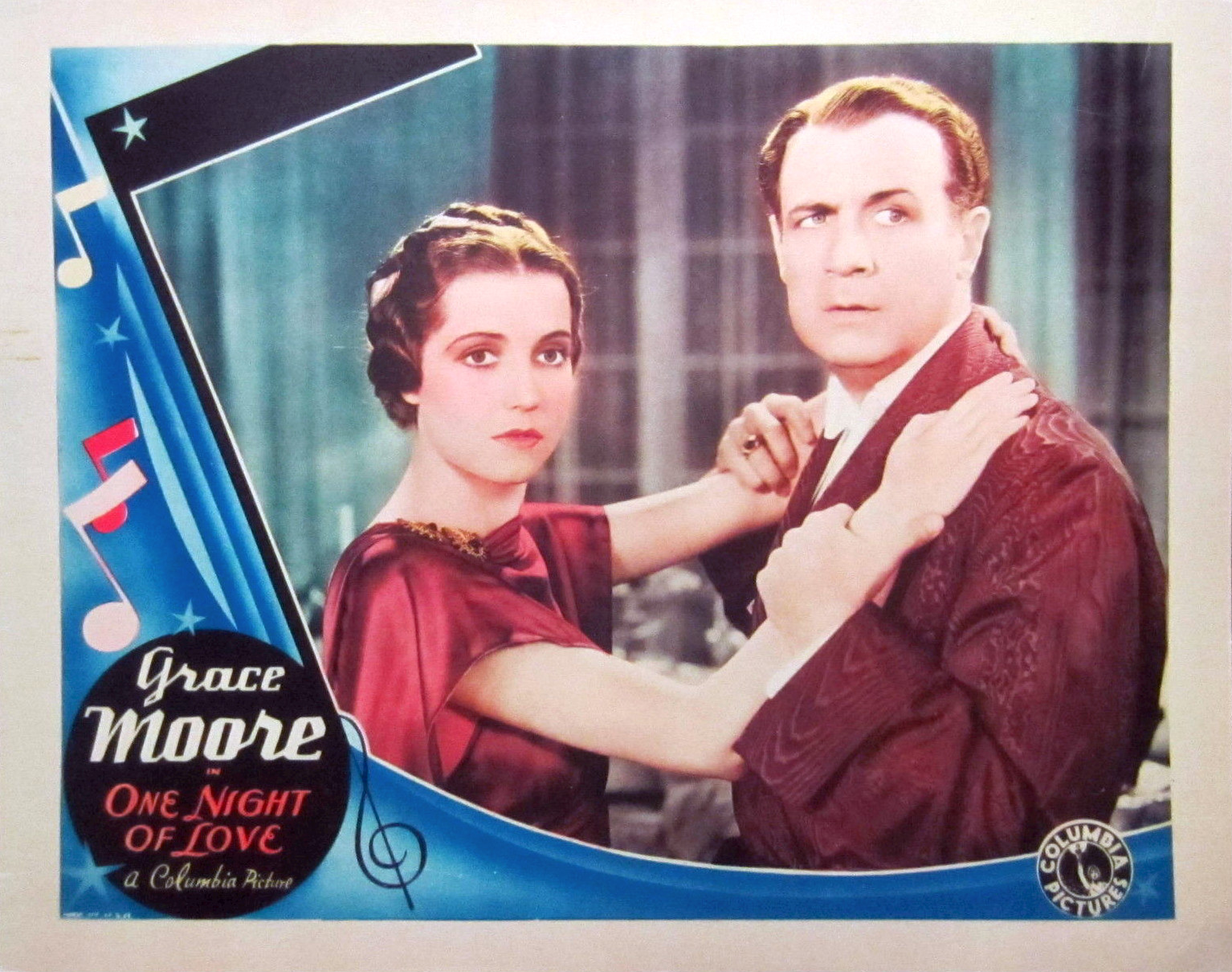
Lobby card

- Grace Moore – Mary Barrett
- Tullio Carminati – Giulio Monteverdi
- Lyle Talbot – Bill Houston
- Mona Barrie – Lally
- Jessie Ralph – Angelina
- Luis Alberni – Giovanni
- Andrés de Segurola – Galuppi
- Nydia Westman – Muriel
- William Burress - Mr. Barrett, Mary's father (uncredited)

== Production ==
The complete proscenium and part of the wings and seating plan of the Metropolitan Opera House were duplicated for this production and occupied the whole of Columbia's largest sound stage.

Moore's recording and performance of the Un bel di aria from Madame Butterfly did not go smoothly, as she had trouble hitting the high notes. According to a later biography, she flew into a rage and blamed the orchestra. However, when studio boss Harry Cohn asked Columbia music director, Morris Stoloff, what the problem was, Stoloff replied, "There's nothing wrong with the orchestra. These are the original Puccini orchestrations." Moore was then told that either she went back to the recording stage or she would be responsible for paying the day's salary for the entire orchestra, and she returned and recorded the aria.

== Featured music ==
Grace Moore's title song "One Night of Love" was composed by Victor Schertzinger himself, with lyrics by Gus Kahn. The lyrics began "One Night Of Love, When two hearts are one". It was later recorded by Anna Moffo as the title track of a 1965 crossover album.

Opera arias

- Chi mi frena from Lucia di Lammermoor by Gaetano Donizetti
- Sempre libera from La traviata by Giuseppe Verdi
- Ah! fors' è lui from La traviata
- Habanera from Carmen by Georges Bizet
- Un bel di from Madame Butterfly by Giacomo Puccini

Traditional songs

- Funiculì, Funiculà, Neapolitan song by Luigi Denza 1880
- Santa Lucia, traditional Neapolitan song
- 'O sole mio, by Eduardo Di Capua
- The Last Rose of Summer, by Thomas Moore
- Ciri-Biri-Bin, by Alberto Pestalozza

== Reception ==
One Night of Love was selected as one of the ten best pictures of the year by Film Daily's annual poll of critics.

Through October 1936 One Night of Love had theater rentals in the U.S. and Canada of over $733,000 according to Variety magazine surveys of the time. The film earned an estimated $2.5 million worldwide. Although it did not do well in rural areas and small towns, One Night of Love was the first Columbia film to gain important bookings in the powerful Loews chain of theaters, which was a milestone in Columbia's progress.

== Awards and nominations ==
At the Academy Awards, the film won two out of six nominations, as well as a Technical Award.

Wins

- Best Music (Scoring): Columbia Studio Music Department, Louis Silvers, head of department (Thematic Music by Victor Schertzinger and Gus Kahn)
- Best Sound Recording: Columbia Studio Sound Department, John Livadary, Sound Director
- Scientific or Technical Award (Class III): To Columbia Pictures Corporation for their application of the Vertical Cut Disc Method (hill and dale recording) to actual studio production, with their recording of the sound on the picture One Night of Love."

Nominations

- Outstanding Production: Columbia
- Best Directing: Victor Schertzinger
- Best Actress: Grace Moore
- Best Film Editing: Gene Milford

The film was also recognized by the American Film Institute:

- Nominated in 2006: AFI's Greatest Movie Musicals
