= Joan of Arc at the Stake =

- Directed by: Roberto Rossellini
- Written by: Roberto Rossellini
- Produced by: Giorgio Criscuolo; Franco Francese
- Starring: Ingrid Bergman; Tullio Carminati
- Cinematography: Gábor Pogány
- Edited by: Jolanda Benvenuti
- Music by: Arthur Honegger
- Release date: 20 December 1954
- Running time: 76 minutes
- Country: Italy
- Language: Italian

Joan of Arc at the Stake (Italian: Giovanna d'Arco al rogo) is a 1954 Italian film directed by Roberto Rossellini and starring his wife Ingrid Bergman, which is based on a live performance in December 1953 at the San Carlo Theatre in Naples of the oratorio Jeanne d'Arc au bûcher by Paul Claudel and Arthur Honegger. It was filmed using a color process called Gevacolor.

Bergman had previously portrayed Joan of Arc in a 1948 American film.

== Plot ==
The film takes place mostly in a surrealistic fantasy around the time of the execution of Joan of Arc. Joan of Arc, played by Ingrid Bergman, is being burned alive for heresy. In a kind of dream state, she departs from her body and looks back upon her life. She begins this journey depressed and demoralized. However, a priest appears to help guide her. First, he shows her those who accused her in the guise of animal characters, in order to show her their true nature. Then, he shows her the good that she has performed for people. In the end, she is proud of what she has done and is ready to face the flames.

== Reception ==
Like most Bergman and Rossellini collaborations, it did not perform well at the box office.
