= Shadowland (magazine) =

Art magazine

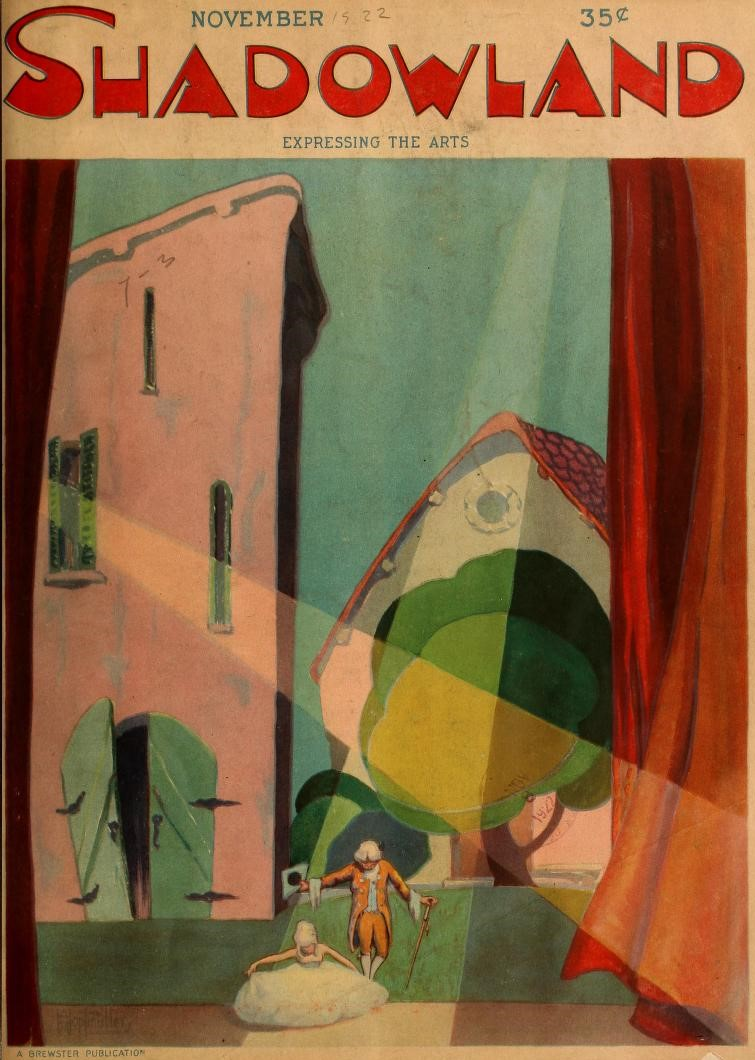
- Cover of Shadowland, November 1922, designed by A. M. Hopfmuller
- Categories: Art; Entertainment
- Frequency: Monthly
- Publisher: M. P. Publishing Company
- First issue: September 1919
- Final issue: November 1923
- Company: Brewster Publications
- Country: United States
- Based in: New York City
- Language: English

Shadowland was an American monthly magazine about art, dance, and film published from 1919 to 1923 before being absorbed by Motion Picture Classic. The first issue appeared in September 1919. The subtitle was "the Handsomest Magazine in the Whole World". The publisher was M. P. Publishing Company and the headquarters was in New York City. It featured art deco illustrations, caricatures, photographs, poetry, and articles concerning artists, actors, dancers, the theatre, and music. Its covers were designed by A. M. Hopfmuller. The last issue was published in November 1923.
