= I'll Take Romance (film) =

1937 film by Edward H. Griffith

- Directed by: Edward H. Griffith
- Written by: Jane Murfin; George Oppenheimer
- Produced by: Everett Riskin
- Starring: Grace Moore; Melvyn Douglas; Helen Westley; Stuart Erwin; Margaret Hamilton
- Cinematography: Lucien N. Andriot
- Edited by: William A. Lyon; Otto Meyer
- Music by: Morris Stoloff
- Production company: Columbia Pictures
- Distributed by: Columbia Pictures
- Release date: November 17, 1937
- Running time: 90 minutes
- Country: United States
- Language: English

I'll Take Romance is a 1937 American romantic musical film directed by Edward H. Griffith, starring Grace Moore, Melvyn Douglas, Helen Westley, Stuart Erwin and Margaret Hamilton.

== Plot ==
An opera manager (Melvyn Douglas) tries to woo a contract-breaking soprano (Grace Moore) into performing in Buenos Aires.

== Cast ==
- Grace Moore as Elsa Terry
- Melvyn Douglas as James Guthrie
- Helen Westley as Madame Della aka Madella
- Stuart Erwin as 'Pancho' Brown
- Margaret Hamilton as Margot
- Walter Kingsford as William Kane
- Richard Carle as Rudi

== Songs ==
- Songs and arias performed by Grace Moore
  - I'll Take Romance (music by Ben Oakland, lyrics by Oscar Hammerstein II)
  - Gavotte (Manon, music by Jules Massenet, lyrics by Henri Meilhac and Philippe Gille)
  - Drinking Song (La traviata, music by Giuseppe Verdi, lyrics by Francesco Maria Piave)
  - First Act Duet (Madama Butterfly, music by Giacomo Puccini, lyrics by Giuseppe Giacosa and Luigi Illica)

- Other Songs
  - Quintet and Finale (Martha, music by Friedrich von Flotow, lyrics by Friedrich Wilhelm Riese
  - She'll Be Comin' Round the Mountain (Traditional)
  - 'A Frangesa! (music and Italian lyrics by Pasquale Mario Costa, English lyrics by Milton Drake)
