= Let's Live Tonight =

1935 film

- Directed by: Victor Schertzinger
- Written by: Bradley King; Gene Markey
- Produced by: Robert North
- Starring: Lilian Harvey; Tullio Carminati; Janet Beecher; Hugh Williams
- Cinematography: Joseph Walker
- Edited by: Gene Milford
- Production company: Columbia Pictures
- Distributed by: Columbia Pictures
- Release date: March 16, 1935
- Running time: 75 minutes
- Country: United States
- Language: English

Let's Live Tonight is a 1935 American musical comedy film directed by Victor Schertzinger and starring Lilian Harvey, Tullio Carminati and Janet Beecher. The film was made as part of an unsuccessful attempt to establish Harvey, who was a top box office draw in Germany, as a major star in Hollywood. Harvey was under contract to Fox Film, but was loaned out to Columbia Pictures for the production. After making it, Harvey returned to Europe, first to Britain to appear in Invitation to the Waltz and then to Germany, where she starred in Black Roses, which relaunched her German career.

== Cast ==
- Lilian Harvey as Kay 'Carlotta' Routledge
- Tullio Carminati as Nick 'Monte' Kerry
- Janet Beecher as Mrs. Routledge
- Hugh Williams as Brian Kerry
- Tala Birell as Countess Margot de Legere
- Luis Alberni as Mario Weems
- Claudia Coleman as Lily Montrose
- Arthur Treacher as Ozzy Featherstone
- Gilbert Emery as Maharajah de Jazaar
- Virginia Hammond as Mrs. Mott
- Adrian Rosley as Cafe Proprietor
- Max Rabinowitz as Pianist
- André Cheron as Frenchman
- John Binet as French Steward

== Bibliography ==
- Ascheid, Antje (2003). Hitler's Heroines: Stardom and Womanhood in Nazi Cinema. Philadelphia: Temple University Press. ISBN 978-1-56639-984-5.
- Bergfelder, Tim; Cargnelli, Christian, eds. (2008). Destination London: German-Speaking Emigrés and British Cinema, 1925–1950. New York: Berghahn Books. ISBN 978-0-85745-019-7.
