= Honeymoon Hate =

1927 film by Luther Reed

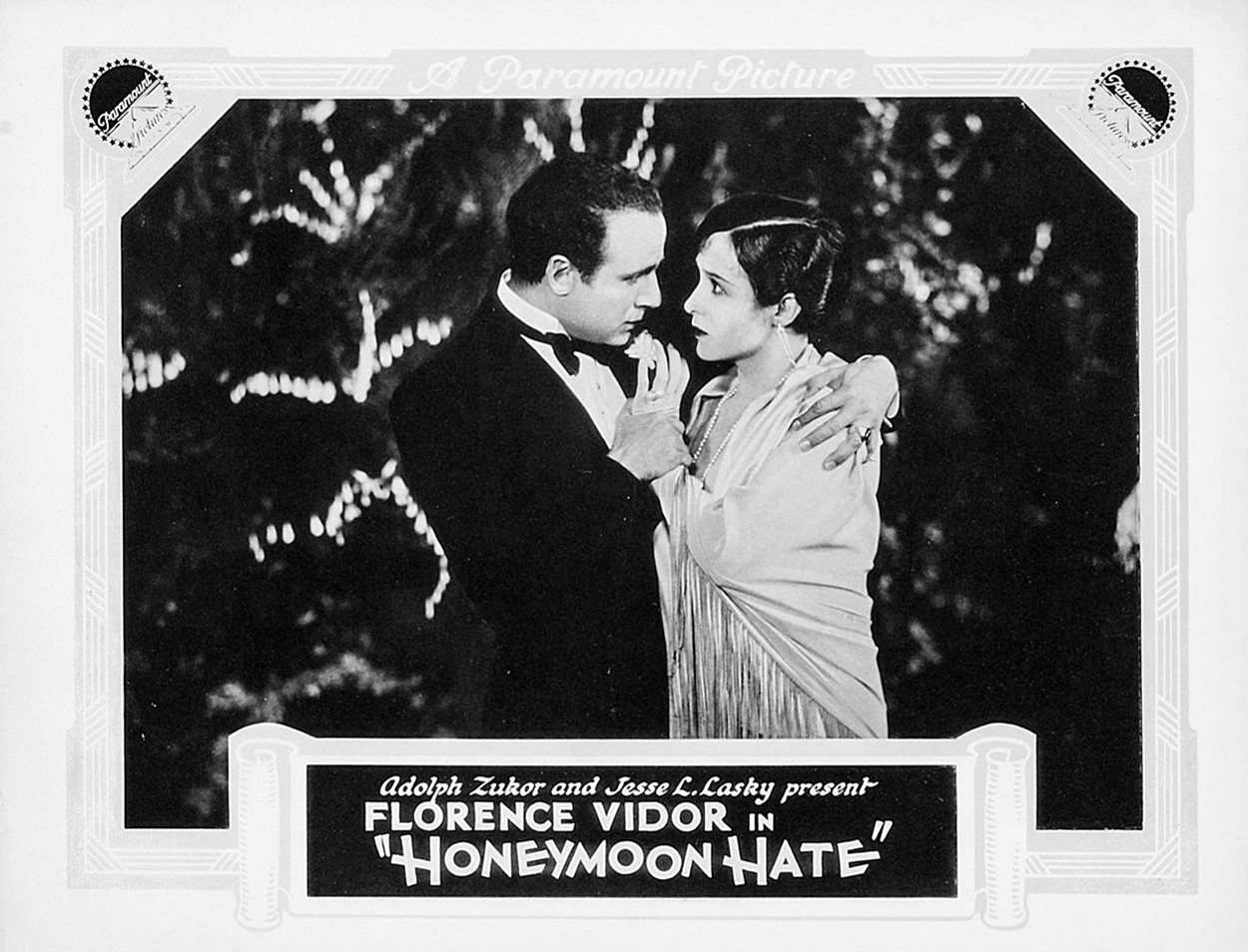
- Lobby card
- Directed by: Luther Reed
- Screenplay by: Doris Anderson; Ethel Doherty; Herman J. Mankiewicz; George Marion Jr. A.M. Williamson (short story)
- Produced by: Jesse L. Lasky; Adolph Zukor
- Starring: Florence Vidor; Tullio Carminati; William Austin; Corliss Palmer; Shirley Dorman; Effie Ellsler
- Cinematography: Harry Fischbeck
- Production company: Famous Players–Lasky Corporation
- Distributed by: Paramount Pictures
- Release date: December 3, 1927
- Running time: 60 minutes
- Country: United States
- Language: Silent (English intertitles)

Honeymoon Hate is a lost 1927 American silent romantic comedy film directed by Luther Reed and written by Doris Anderson, Ethel Doherty, Herman J. Mankiewicz, George Marion Jr., and A.M. Williamson. The film stars Florence Vidor, Tullio Carminati, William Austin, Corliss Palmer, Shirley Dorman, and Effie Ellsler. The film was released on December 3, 1927, by Paramount Pictures.

== Cast ==
- Florence Vidor as Gail Grant
- Tullio Carminati as Prince Dantarini
- William Austin as Banning-Green
- Corliss Palmer as Mrs. Fremont Gage I
- Shirley Dorman as Mrs. Fremont Gage II
- Effie Ellsler as Miss Molosey
- Genaro Spagnoli as Bueno
- Marcel Guillaume as Pietro
- Albert Conti (uncredited)
