= Jenny Lind (film) =

1932 film

- Directed by: Arthur Robison
- Written by: Jacques Deval; Dorothy Farnum; Hanns Kräly; Claudine West
- Starring: Grace Moore; André Luguet; André Berley
- Cinematography: Norbert Brodine
- Production company: Metro-Goldwyn-Mayer
- Distributed by: Metro-Goldwyn-Mayer
- Release date: February 12, 1932
- Running time: 92 minutes
- Country: United States
- Language: French

Jenny Lind is a 1932 American pre-Code musical film directed by Arthur Robison and starring Grace Moore, André Luguet and André Berley. It is a French-language remake of the 1930 film A Lady's Morals, which also starred Moore but had a largely different cast and crew. Alternative language versions were common during the early years of sound until dubbing became more widespread.

The film portrays the career of the 19th century Swedish opera singer Jenny Lind.

== Cast ==
- Grace Moore as Jenny Lind
- André Luguet as Paul Brandt
- André Berley as P.T. Barnum
- Françoise Rosay as Rosatti
- Mona Goya as Selma
- Georges Mauloy as Garcia
- Paul Porcasi as Maretti
- Adrienne D'Ambricourt as Adèle
- Giovanni Martino as Zerga

== Bibliography ==
- Gevinson, Alan. Within Our Gates: Ethnicity in American Feature Films, 1911-1960. University of California Press, 1997.
