= The Night Bird =

1928 film

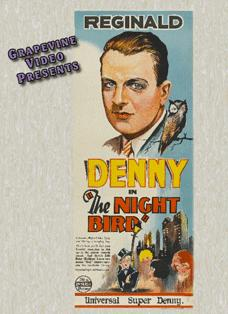
- Directed by: Fred C. Newmeyer
- Written by: Nicholas T. Barrows; Albert DeMond; Fanny Hatton; Frederic Hatton; Earle Snell
- Produced by: Carl Laemmle
- Starring: Reginald Denny; Corliss Palmer; Sam Hardy
- Cinematography: Maurice Pivar
- Edited by: Frank Atkinson; Ray Curtiss
- Production company: Universal Pictures
- Distributed by: Universal Pictures
- Release date: September 16, 1928
- Running time: 70 minutes
- Country: United States
- Languages: Silent; English intertitles

The Night Bird is a 1928 American silent comedy film directed by Fred C. Newmeyer and starring Reginald Denny, Corliss Palmer and Sam Hardy.

== Synopsis ==
A New York boxer falls in love with an Italian girl he meets in Central Park. However his manager tries to prevent a relationship developing for fears of its impact on his career.

== Cast ==
- Reginald Denny as Kid Davis
- Betsy Lee as Madelena
- Sam Hardy as Gleason
- Harvey Clark as Silsburg
- Corliss Palmer as Blonde
- Jocelyn Lee as Redhead
- Alphonse Martell as Pete
- George Bookasta as Joe
- Michael Visaroff as Mario
- Adele Watson as Maid

== Bibliography ==
- Munden, Kenneth White. The American Film Institute Catalog of Motion Pictures Produced in the United States, Part 1. University of California Press, 1997.
