= Grace Moore =

American operatic soprano and actress (1898–1947)

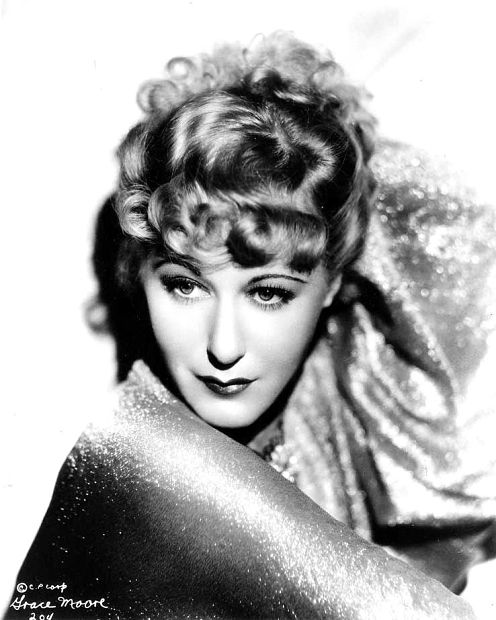
Grace Moore in the 1930s

Mary Willie Grace Moore (December 5, 1898 – January 26, 1947) was an American operatic lyric soprano and actress in musical theatre and film. She was nicknamed the "Tennessee Nightingale." Her films helped to popularize opera by bringing it to a larger audience. She was nominated for the Academy Award for Best Actress for her performance in One Night of Love.

In 1947, Moore died in a plane crash at the age of 48. She published an autobiography in 1944 titled You're Only Human Once. In 1953, a film about her life was released titled So This Is Love starring Kathryn Grayson.

== Early life ==
Moore was born Mary Willie Grace Moore, the daughter of Tessa Jane (née Stokely) and Richard Lawson Moore. She was born in the community of Slabtown (now considered part of Del Rio) in Cocke County, Tennessee. By the time she was two years old, her family had relocated to Knoxville, a move Moore later described as traumatic. She found urban life distasteful at the time. After several years in Knoxville, the family again relocated to Jellico, Tennessee, where Moore spent her adolescence. After attending Jellico High School, where she was captain of the girls basketball team (see monument photo in this article), she studied briefly at Ward-Belmont College in Nashville before moving to Washington, D.C., where she studied at Wilson-Greens School of Music in Chevy Chase, Maryland. She relocated to New York in 1919 to pursue her singing career and performed there in nightclubs to help pay for singing classes. Moore's first professional singing performance was at The Black Cat Café in Greenwich Village.

== Career ==
=== Musical theater ===
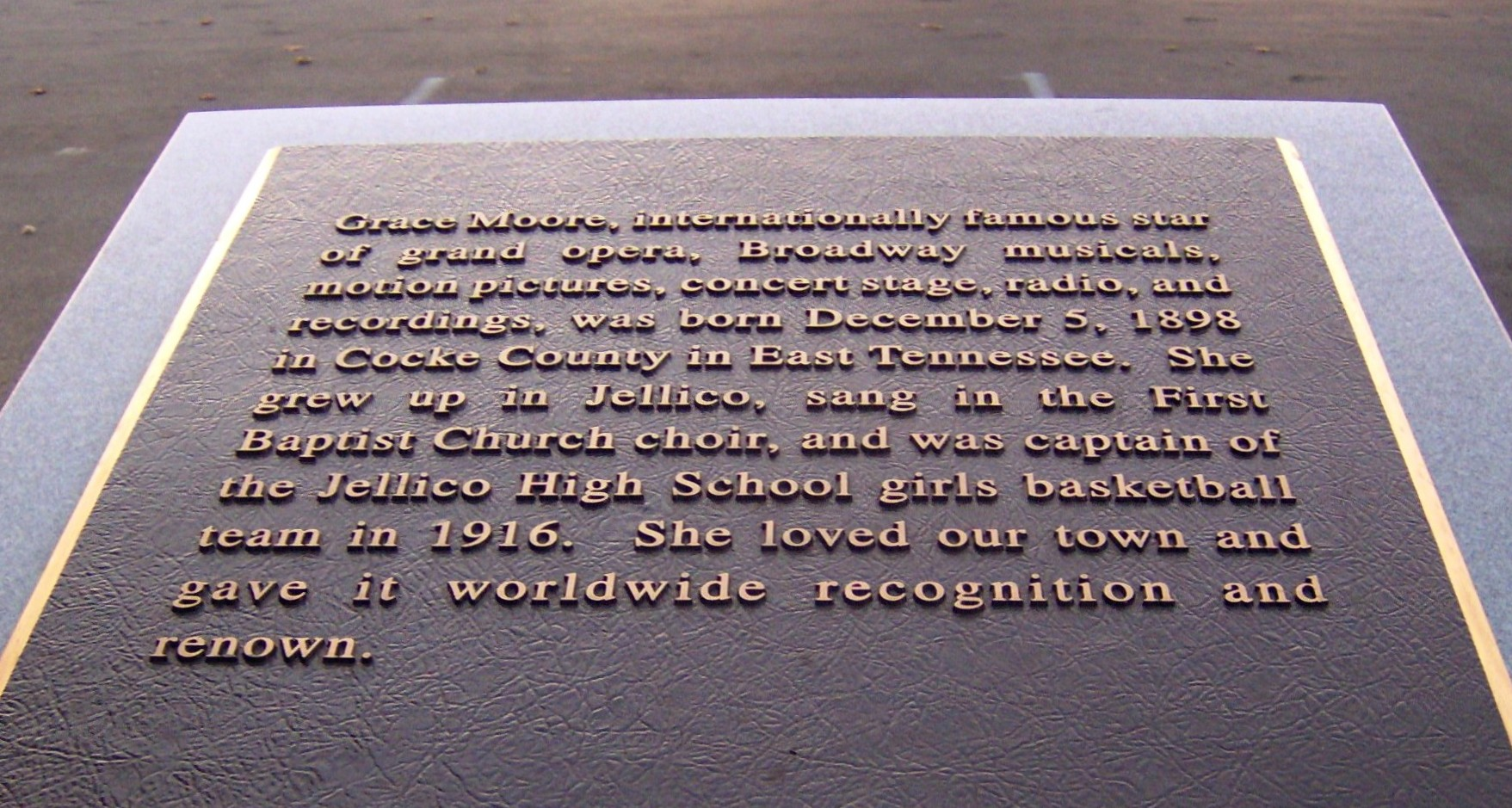
Grace Moore monument in Jellico, Tennessee.

Grace Moore's first Broadway appearance was in 1920 in the musical revue Hitchy-Koo, by Jerome Kern. She also appeared in Suite Sixteen, Just a Minute, Town Gossip, and Up in the Clouds. In 1922 and 1923 she appeared in the second and third of Irving Berlin's series of four Music Box Revues. In the 1923 edition she and John Steel introduced Berlin's song "What'll I Do". When Moore sang "An Orange Grove in California", orange blossom perfume was wafted through the theater.

In 1932 she appeared on Broadway in the short-lived operetta The DuBarry by Karl Millöcker.

=== Opera ===
After training in France, Moore made her operatic debut at the Metropolitan Opera in New York City on February 7, 1928, singing the role of Mimì in Giacomo Puccini's La bohème. She then sang Juliette in Roméo et Juliette, which led to a European tour. She debuted at the Opéra-Comique in Paris on September 29, 1928 as Mimì, which she also performed in a Royal Command Performance at Covent Garden in London on June 6, 1935. During her sixteen seasons with the Metropolitan Opera, she sang in several Italian and French operas as well as the title roles in Tosca, Manon, and Louise. Louise was her favorite opera and is widely considered to have been her greatest role. She also sang in Carmen, Faust, Pagliacci, Gianni Schicchi, and others.

In the 1930s and 1940s she gave concert performances throughout the United States and Europe, performing a repertoire of operatic selections and other songs in German, French, Italian, Spanish, and English. During World War II, she was active in the USO, entertaining American troops abroad. In 1945 she sang Mimi to Nino Martini's Rodolfo in La bohème for the inaugural performance of the San Antonio Grand Opera Festival.

She also performed during and after WWII in support of Allied Forces. From the personal memoire of Lt. Gen. John C. H. Lee, on 24 July 1945: "After an early dinner drove in convoy to the Paris Opera House for the gala performance entitled "Pacifique 45" given by the French for the benefit of the families of French war veterans. The program laid particular emphasis on the war in Japan and included the showing of two films - "Fighting Lady" and "Iwo Jima" and the rendition of several songs and the French and American national anthems by Grace Moore. Seated in the box of honor were General Alphonse Juin, the French Minister of Information Jacques Soustelle, and a number of important American and French officers. It seemed to be a great success and was particularly appreciated by the crowd of some 20,000 gathered in the square outside the Opera House."

=== Film ===
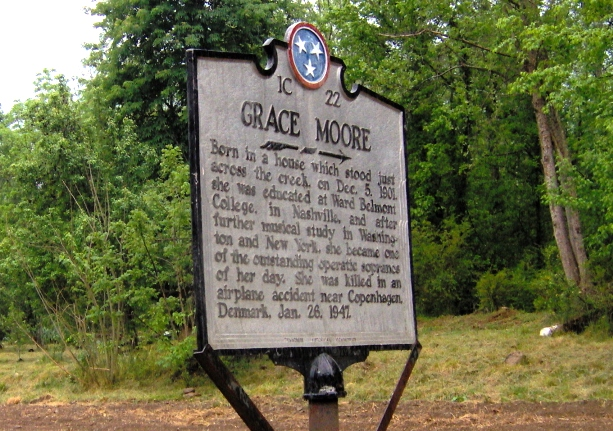
Historical marker noting Moore's birthplace in Del Rio, Tennessee

Attracted to Hollywood in the early years of talking pictures, Moore had her first screen role as Jenny Lind in the 1930 film A Lady's Morals, produced for MGM by Irving Thalberg and directed by Sidney Franklin. Later that same year she starred with the Metropolitan Opera singer Lawrence Tibbett in New Moon, also produced by MGM, the first screen version of Sigmund Romberg's operetta The New Moon.

After a hiatus of several years, Moore returned to Hollywood under contract to Columbia Pictures, for whom she made six films. In the 1934 film One Night of Love, her first film for Columbia, she portrayed a small-town girl who aspires to sing opera. For that role she was nominated for the Academy Award for Best Actress in 1935. She starred in 1936 as Empress Elisabeth of Austria in Josef von Sternberg's production The King Steps Out.

By this time, she was so popular that MGM was able to insist on equal billing for Moore in a projected film with Maurice Chevalier, who had always enjoyed solo star billing up until then. Chevalier felt so deeply about this blow to his status that he quit Hollywood and the film was never made.

A memorable highlight of When You're in Love (1937) was a comic scene in which Moore donned flannel shirt and trousers and joined a 5-man band for a flamboyant rendition of Cab Calloway's "Minnie the Moocher", complete with gestures and "hi-de-ho's", but with the lyrics slightly altered to conform with Hollywood sensibilities. Also, she performed the popular Madama Butterfly duet "Vogliatemi bene" with American tenor Frank Forest in the 1937 film I'll Take Romance.

The last film that Moore made was Louise (1939), an abridged version of Gustave Charpentier's opera of the same name, with spoken dialog in place of some of the original opera's music. The composer participated in the production, authorizing the cuts and changes to the libretto, coaching Moore, and advising director Abel Gance. This production also featured two renowned French singers: dramatic tenor Georges Thill and basse cantante André Pernet.

== Controversies ==
She was widely criticized in December 1938 when she curtsied to the Duchess of Windsor, in Cannes. Upon her return to the United States after six months and ten days in Europe ("to save money in income tax"), Moore defended her curtsy, saying:

She would have been a royal duchess long ago if she had not been an American. After all, she gave happiness and the courage of her convictions to one man, which is more than most women can do. She deserves a curtsy for that alone.

According to Joe Laurie Jr., vaudeville performer and historian, Grace Moore would not perform on vaudeville bills that included black performers.

However, this is at odds with some comments by Moore herself in her autobiography.

"All along I felt that all people were born to equal opportunity because that is the way my mother and father lived their lives. And I don't mean opportunity handed out on a silver platter, but opportunity that was there without social or racial strings for anyone who had the initiative to reach and hold."

She also mentions being baptised in a creek at an African American Baptist church ceremony at Newcomb, Tennessee during her adolescence; and that the popular African American vocal and piano duo of Turner Layton and Clarence Johnstone (ie Layton & Johnstone) performed at parties in her own flat in New York along with other showbiz connections during her early days of stardom.

Furthermore, the alleged incident quoted by Joe Laurie Jr. about Loew's Capitol Theatre on Broadway, New York allegedly calling off a booking for Grace Moore, due to her supposed response to Mary Garden sharing a bill there with the Mills Brothers, does not appear to be entirely correct. Theatre listings in the New York Times show that Mary Garden and the Mills Brothers appeared at the Capitol on 6 nights from 27 January to 1 February 1933. On those dates Grace Moore was already fully committed to a long-running stage show called 'The Dubarry' at another theatre in New York, which ran from 22 November 1932 to 3 February 1933, after which the production was scheduled to go on tour. A few weeks later on 31 March 1933 Grace Moore did start a 2 week booking at Loew's Capitol Theatre in New York.

== Honors ==
In 1935 Moore received the gold medal award of the Society of Arts and Sciences for "conspicuous achievement in raising the standard of cinema entertainment." In 1936 King Christian X of Denmark awarded her his country's medal of 'Ingenito et Arti.' In 1937, she was commissioned as a colonel (an honorary position) on the staff of the governor of Tennessee, and was also made a life member of the Tennessee State Society of Washington, D.C. She was decorated as a chevalier of the French Légion d'honneur in 1939. Moore was also a member of the Peabody Awards Board of Jurors from 1940 to 1942. She has a star on the Hollywood Walk of Fame at 6274 Hollywood Blvd, Hollywood, Los Angeles, CA.

== Personal life ==
Moore married Valentín Parera, a Spanish movie actor, in Cannes, on July 15, 1931. They had 2 children. During the 1930s they maintained homes in Hollywood, Cannes, and Connecticut. She was rumored in the Catholic media to plan to enter the Roman Catholic Church after a private audience with Pope Pius XII in May 1946, with some saying it was because her husband was Catholic. However, biographers claim that she merely said on the steps of the Vatican that it would be nice, and this was misinterpreted by members of the press.

== Death ==
Grace Moore died at the age of 48, along with 21 other people, including Prince Gustaf Adolf of Sweden, in a plane crash near Copenhagen Airport on January 26, 1947. Moore is buried in Forest Hills Cemetery in Chattanooga.

== Filmography ==
- A Lady's Morals (1930; later released under the title Jenny Lind in the United Kingdom and in a French-language version)
- New Moon (1930)
- One Night of Love (1934)
- Love Me Forever (1935)
- The King Steps Out (1936)
- When You're in Love (1937)
- I'll Take Romance (1937)
- Louise (1939)

== Sources ==
- Binnicker, Charles M. "Grace Moore" entry in Tennessee Encyclopedia of History and Culture
- Kenrick, John. Who's Who in Musicals
- New World Records, Follies, Scandals & Other Diversions: From Ziegfeld to the Shuberts, New World NW 215, liner notes
- New World Records, The Vintage Irving Berlin, New World NW 238, liner notes
- Siler, James Hayden. The History of Jellico. Unpublished manuscript, 1938.
