= Paris in Spring =

1935 film by Lewis Milestone

- Directed by: Lewis Milestone
- Screenplay by: Samuel Hoffenstein; Franz Schulz adaptation by Keene Thompson
- Based on: Paris in Spring (play) by Dwight Taylor
- Produced by: Benjamin Glazer
- Starring: Mary Ellis; Tullio Carminati; Ida Lupino; Lynne Overman; Jessie Ralph; Dorothea Wolbert
- Cinematography: Ted Tetzlaff
- Edited by: Eda Warren
- Music by: Harry Revel; Mack Gordon
- Production company: Paramount Pictures
- Release date: 28 May 1935 (United States Theatrical)
- Running time: 82 minutes
- Country: United States
- Language: English

Paris in Spring (also released as Paris Love Song) is a 1935 black and white musical comedy film directed by Lewis Milestone for Paramount Pictures. It is based on a play by Dwight Taylor, with a screen play by Samuel Hoffenstein and Franz Schulz.

== Plot ==
Afraid of marriage, Simone ends her long-term engagement with her fiancé Paul de Lille. Paul heads to the top of The Eiffel Tower with thoughts of suicide. In another part of Paris, and also afraid of marriage, Mignon decides to separate from her young lover, Albert de Charelle. Despairing, Mignon also climbs to the top of The Eiffel Tower intending to leap to her death. There she meets Paul and the two compare stories. After discussion, Paul dissuades her from leaping and the two conspire to make their respective partners jealous by pretending to have an affair with each other.

== Cast ==
- Mary Ellis as Simone
- Tullio Carminati as Paul de Lille
- Ida Lupino as Mignon de Charelle
- Lynne Overman as DuPont
- James Blakeley as Albert de Charelle
- Jessie Ralph as Grandma Leger
- Dorothea Wolbert as Francine
- Akim Tamiroff as Cafe Manager
- Jack Raymond as Elevator Man
- Arnold Korff as Doctor
- Rolfe Sedan as Modiste
- Arthur Housman as Interviewer
- Jack Mulhall as George, Cafe Simone Doorman
- Michael Mark as Bartender
- Billy Gilbert as First Chef
- William Irving as Second Chef
- Francis Ford as Drunken Peasant
- Craig Reynolds as Alphonse
- Harold Entwistle as Charles The Butler
- Sam Ash as Clerk

== Soundtrack ==
- "Paris in Spring" by Harry Revel and Mack Gordon, sung by Mary Ellis and Tullio Carminati
- "Jealousy", sung by Mary Ellis
- "Bonjour et Bonsoir", sung by Mary Ellis and Tullio Carminati

== Reception and release ==
The film was first released in US theaters on 28 May 1935. The New York Times reviewer wrote that while Mary Ellis offered a degree of entertainment with her singing, Tullio Carminati did not help the film by treating the film in a burlesque style. The newspaper was of the opinion Ida Lupino and James Blakeley were moderately good in their roles, but any merited praise for acting was to the credit of Lynne Overman, Jessie Ralph, and to the actor in the lesser role of the Chez Simone manager.

Reviewer Graham Greene praised Milestone's emulation of Ernst Lubitsch in his ability to create a film that was a "silly, charming tale", and make something "light, enchanting, and genuinely fantastic" out of a nonsense plot device. Lupino's role in Paris in Spring has been described as "dull", a view she shared.
