= Motion Picture Magazine =

American magazine

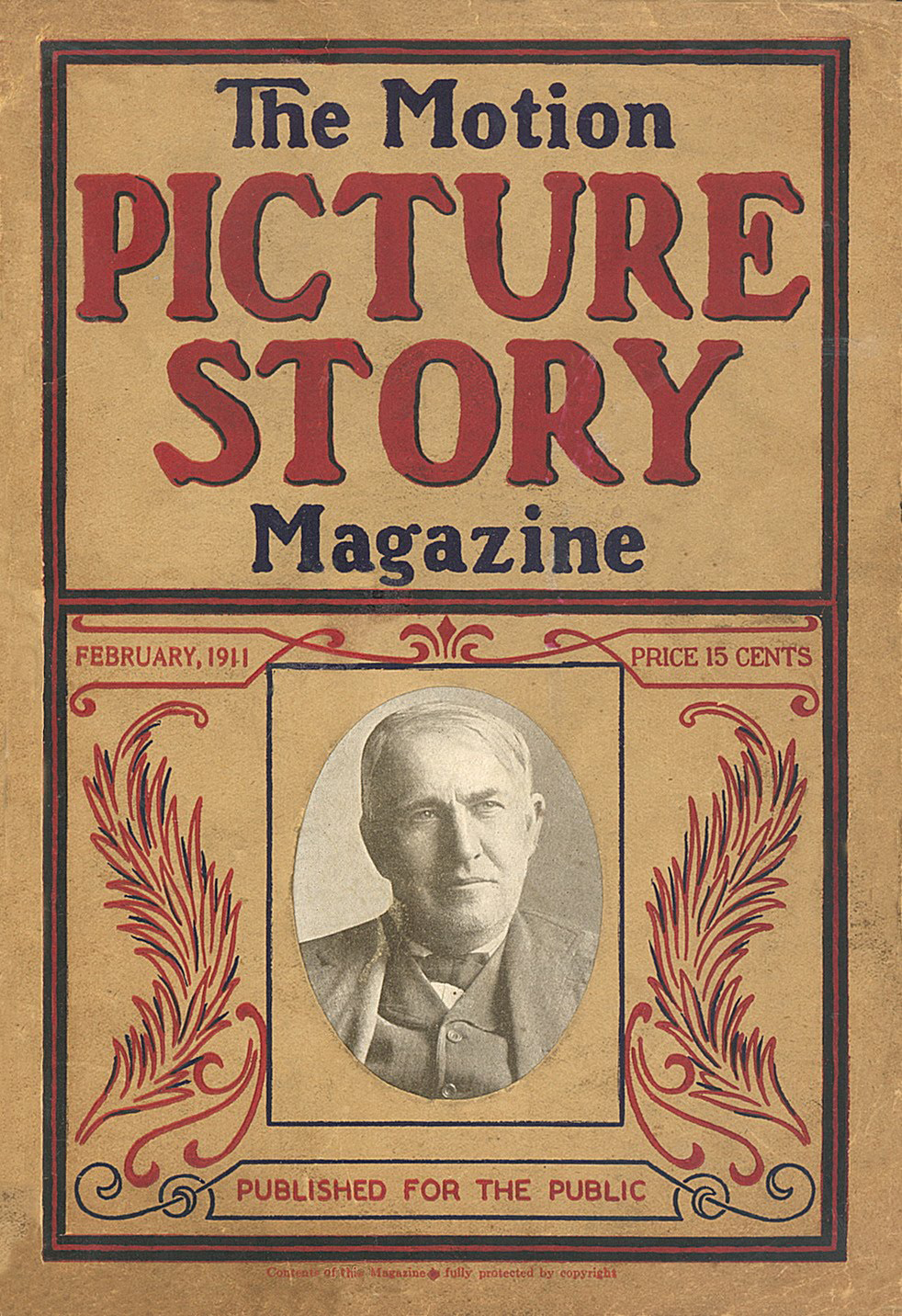
- Front cover of the first issue of The Motion Picture Story Magazine (February 1911) featuring Edison
- Categories: Fan magazine
- Frequency: Monthly
- Publisher: M. P. Publishing Company, Inc.
- Founded: 1911
- Final issue: 1977
- Country: United States
- Language: English

Motion Picture was an American monthly fan magazine about film, published from 1911 to 1977. It was lastly published by Macfadden Publications.

== History and profile ==
The magazine was established by Vitagraph Studios co-founder J. Stuart Blackton and partner Eugene V. Brewster under the title The Motion Picture Story Magazine. In contrast to earlier film magazines such as The Moving Picture World, which were aimed at film exhibitors, The Motion Picture Story Magazine was aimed at regular film goers. It has been regarded as the first fan magazine.

The magazine was very successful from its inception, with an initial run of 50,000 copies and a circulation of 200,000 by 1914. Writers were amazed at the outset to receive their checks for contributions almost immediately on acceptance, a policy on the part of Brewster that was effective in quickly inducing the highest grade fiction authors to become affiliated with the publication. Contributors included Rex Beach, Will Carleton and Horatio C. King.

The magazine's most successful column was entitled "The Answer Man" (written by a woman) that answered readers' questions about the film world. This was an innovation, the first of its kind in journalism.

In 1914, it was renamed Motion Picture Magazine. Early editions included fiction and information on how to get involved in film production. The magazine shifted to a focus on celebrities and attracted a larger female readership. In 1919, the circulation jumped from 248,845 to 400,000.

In 1941, Motion Picture Magazine merged with Hollywood ("Motion Picture combined with Hollywood Magazine"), and Screen Life and continued to be published for almost four more decades, ending its run in 1977.

== Motion Picture Classic ==
Its sister publication Motion Picture Classic, started as its supplement, was published monthly from September 1915 to March 1931.

== The Motion Picture Hall of Fame ==
The Motion Picture Hall of Fame was a contest held by Motion Picture Magazine.

"The Motion Picture Hall of Fame." Motion Picture Magazine. Dec, 1918: 10.

The Hollywood Motion Picture Hall of Fame exhibit, at the California Pacific International Exposition, in 1935–36, had a stock company of actors that signed with the Screen Actors Guild and The Dominos Club of Hollywood (social organization for actresses, including: Carole Lombard, Thelma Todd, and ZaSu Pitts).

"Wax Mannequins of Film Stars" were housed in a "Motion Picture Hall of Fame" in Hollywood, Los Angeles, California
