= Isma Dooly =

American editor (1870–1921)

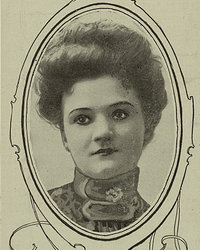
- Isma Dooly, from a newspaper clipping, about 1900.
- Born: 1870; Georgia
- Died: May 11, 1921 (aged 50–51); Atlanta, Georgia
- Other name: Isma Dooley
- Occupations: Newspaper editor, clubwoman
- Known for: Editor of first "woman's page" in a Southern newspaper

Isma Dooly (1870 – May 11, 1921), also seen as Isma Dooley, was an American newspaper editor and clubwoman, based in Atlanta, Georgia.

== Early life ==
Isma Dooly was born in Georgia. She was raised as the daughter of her aunt and uncle, Martin H. Dooly and Margaret "Meta" d'Laracy Dooly; both parents were born in Ireland. She attended school at the Convent of the Sacred Heart in New York.

== Career ==
Dooly was a reporter and editor at The Atlanta Constitution from 1893 to 1921, and edited the Woman's Department section, the first "woman's page" in a Southern newspaper. Beyond the usual society-page topics such as corsets and shoes, Dooly's writing covered the war in Cuba, a Japanese silent film actress, automotive sports, and prison conditions in Georgia.

Dooly was one of the founders and leaders of the Atlanta Woman's Club, and of the Georgia Federation of Woman's Clubs. She opposed the inclusion of "radical or sentimental" women in the federation's work, including suffragists and working-class women, though she approved of charitable and educational efforts to improve the lives of poor and black Atlantans. She served on the Board of Lady Visitors for Atlanta's public schools, worked for the admission of women to the University of Georgia, and was active in the United Daughters of the Confederacy.

During World War I, Dooly headed the publicity department of the Georgia division of the Woman's Committee Council of National Defense.

== Personal life ==
Dooly died in 1921, aged 50, in Atlanta. A school auditorium in Tallulah Falls was named in her memory.
