= Life in the Raw =

1933 film by Louis King

- Theatrical release poster
- Directed by: Louis King
- Screenplay by: Stuart Anthony
- Starring: George O'Brien; Claire Trevor; Greta Nissen; Francis Ford; Warner Richmond; Steve Pendleton
- Cinematography: Robert H. Planck
- Edited by: Barney Wolf
- Production company: Fox Film Corporation
- Distributed by: Fox Film Corporation
- Release date: July 7, 1933
- Running time: 59 minutes
- Country: United States
- Language: English

Life in the Raw is a 1933 American pre-Code Western film, based on Zane Grey's short story "From Missouri", directed by Louis King and written by Stuart Anthony. It was Claire Trevor's film debut.

== Cast ==
- George O'Brien as Jim Barry
- Claire Trevor as Judy Halloway
- Greta Nissen as Belle
- Francis Ford as Sheriff Myles
- Warner Richmond as Harvey (H.B.) Lamson
- Steve Pendleton as Tom Halloway
- Alan Edwards as Colonel Nicholai Petroff
- Nigel De Brulier as McTavish
