= Arlette Marchal =

French actress (1902–1984)

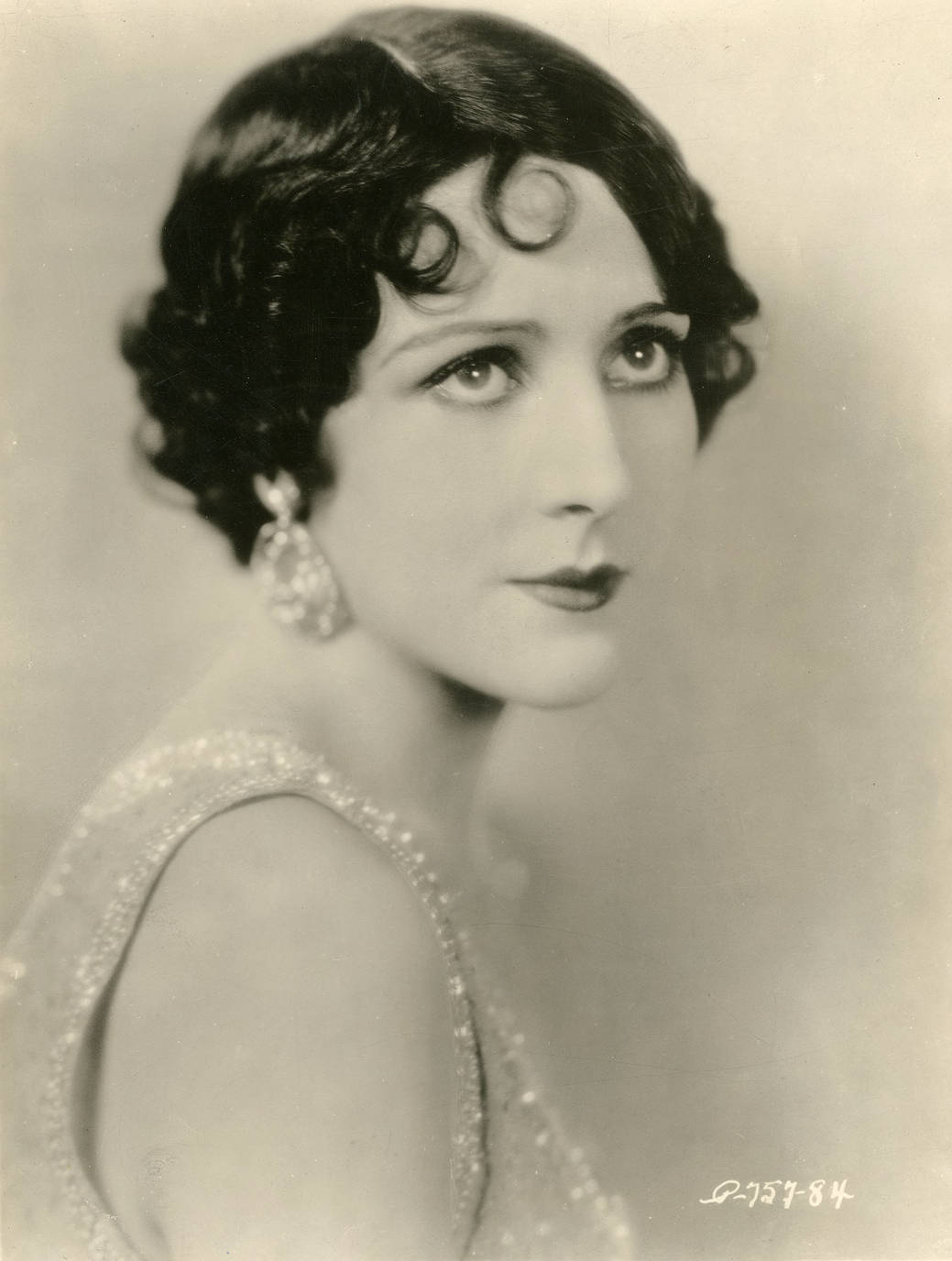
- Marchall in 1927
- Born: 29 January 1902; 6th arrondissement of Paris, France
- Died: 11 February 1984 (aged 82); Paris, France
- Occupation: Actress
- Years active: 1922–1951

Arlette Marchal (29 January 1902 – 11 February 1984) was a French film actress. She appeared in more than 40 films between 1922 and 1951. She was born and died in Paris.

== Partial filmography ==
- Mon p'tit (1922)
- The Gardens of Murcia (1923) - Maria del Carmen
- Sarati le terrible (Sarati the Terrible) (1923) - Hélène
- The Portrait (1923) - Madeleine Fontevrault "das Bildnis"
- La Dame au ruban de velours (1923) - Adrienne
- Un coquin (1923) - Renée de Meillane
- The Bell of Love (La Cabane d'amour) (1923) - Norine Pastoret
- Terror (1924) - Madame Gauthier
- Die Sklavenkönigin (aka Moon of Israel (USA)) (1924) - Userti
- Un Drame au Carlton Club (The Carlton Club Drama) (1924)
- The Last House on the Beach (1924)
- Madame Sans-Gene (1925) - Marie-Caroline, la Reine de Naples
- Venetian Lovers (1925) - Countess Lola Astoni
- Born to the West (1926) - Belle of Paradise Bar
- The Cat's Pajamas (1926) - Riza Dorina
- Diplomacy (1926) - Countess Zicka
- The Lady of Lebanon (1926) - Countess Athelstane Orloff
- Das Bildnis (1926)
- Forlorn River (1926) - Ina Blaine
- Blonde or Brunette (1927) - Blanche
- Wings (1927) - Celeste
- Le manoir de la peur (1927)
- Hula (1927) - Mrs. Bane
- A Gentleman of Paris (1927) - Yvonne Dufour
- The Spotlight (1927) - Maggie Courtney
- The Woman of Yesterday and Tomorrow (1928) - Hilde von Lobach
- The Lady with the Mask (1928) - Doris von Seefeld - seine Tochter
- Figaro (1929) - Rosine
- An Ideal Woman (1929) - Suzanne Fleury
- Boudoir diplomatique (1931)
- Don Quichotte (1933) - The Duchess
- La Poule (1933) - Guillemette
- The Oil Sharks (1933) - Jeannette
- Le Petit Roi (The Little King) (1933) - La comtesse Slasko
- The Ideal Woman (1934) - Madeleine
- Toboggan (1934) - Lisa
- L'auberge du Petit-Dragon (1934)
- La Marche nuptiale (1935) - Suzanne Lechatelier
- Entente cordiale (1939) - La reine Alexandra
- La Piste du nord (1939) - Mme. Shaw
- The Newspaper Falls at Five O'Clock (1942) - Jeanne Marchal
- Father Serge (1945) - La tsarine
- The Elusive Pimpernel (1950) - Contesses de Tournai
- Without Leaving an Address (1951) - Madame Forestier

== Theater ==
- Tovaritch, Paris Theatre (1960)
