= Greta Nissen =

Norwegian-American actress (1906–1988)

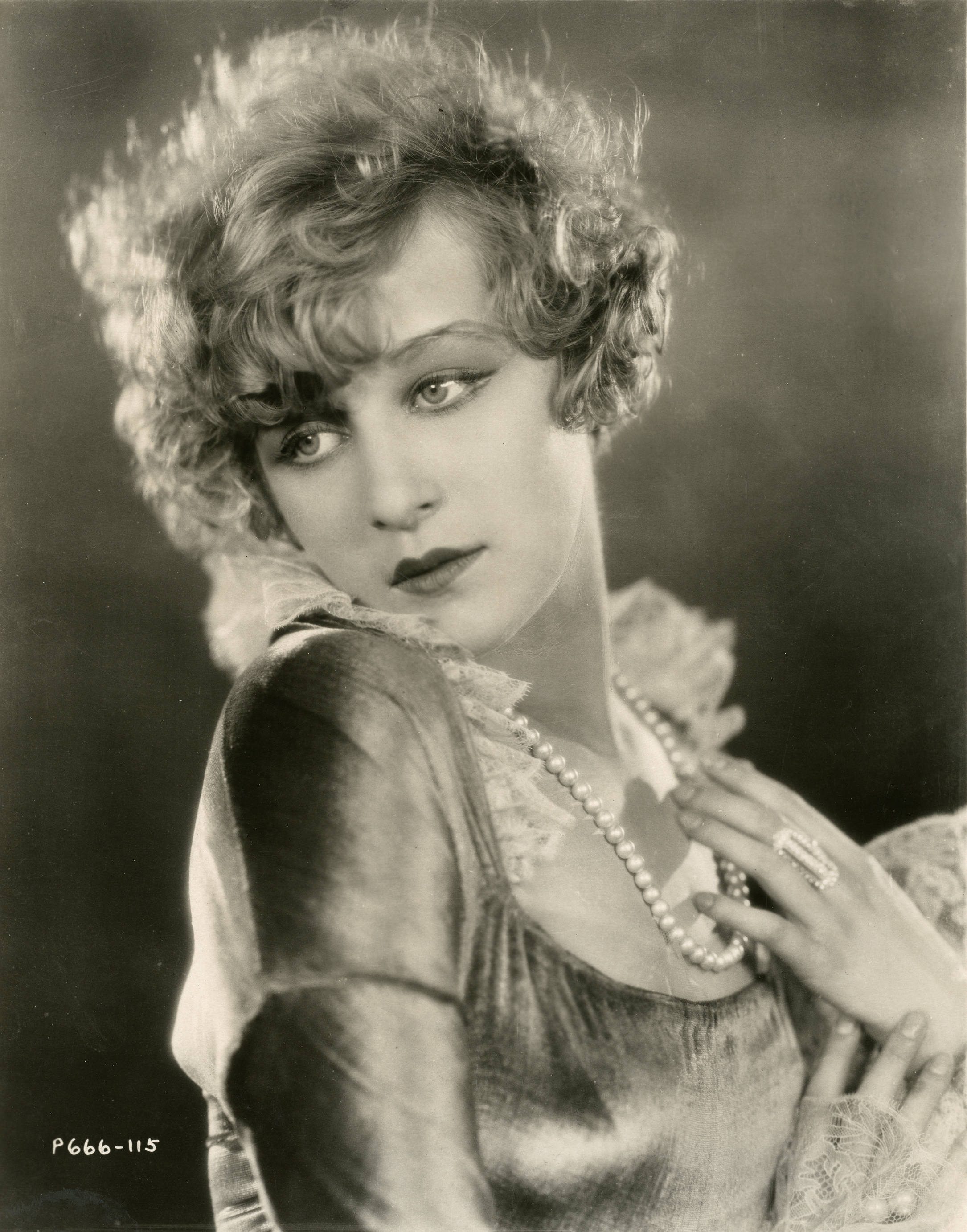
- Nissen in 1925
- Born: Grethe Rüzt-Nissen; January 30, 1906; Kristiania (now Oslo), Norway
- Died: May 15, 1988 (aged 82); Montecito, California, U.S.
- Years active: 1923–1937
- Spouses: Weldon Heyburn (m. 1932; ann. 1936) Stuart D. Eckert (m. 1941)
- Children: 1

Greta Nissen (born Grethe Rüzt-Nissen; 30 January 1906 – 15 May 1988) was a Norwegian-American film and stage actress.

== Stage and screen actress ==
Born Grethe Rüzt-Nissen in Kristiania (now Oslo), Norway, Nissen was originally a dancer. While still a student at the company's school in Copenhagen, she danced with the Royal Danish Ballet, debuted as a solo ballerina on the National Theatre in 1922. She toured in Norway and appeared in several Danish films.

Nissen made her Broadway debut as a ballerina in 1924. She had studied ballet with Michel Fokine. In early 1924, she came as a member of a Danish ballet troupe to New York, where she was soon hired to do a larger dance number for George S. Kaufman in the musical Beggar on Horseback. She was discovered by film producer Jesse L. Lasky of Paramount Pictures, and would appear in more than twenty films.

She appeared in The Wanderer (1925, director Raoul Walsh). Among her other films were Lost: A Wife, The King on Main Street, The Love Thief, Ambassador Bill, The Lucky Lady, and Honours Easy.

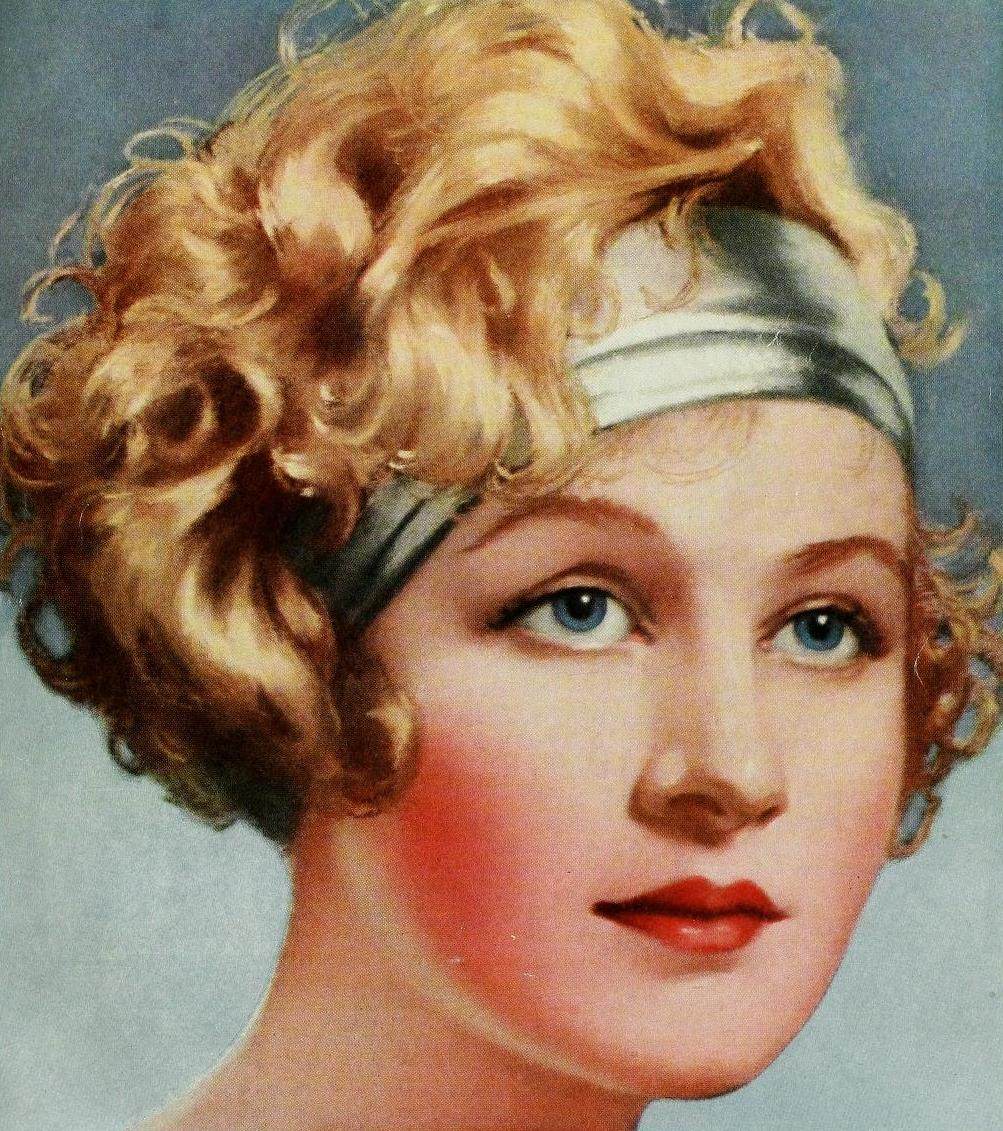
Greta Nissen by Tempest Inman in Photoplay of July 1925

Nissen was cast as Helen, the female lead in Hell's Angels, originally conceived as a silent film. Principal photography began on 31 October 1927, with an interior shot at the Metropolitan Studio in Hollywood.

Midway through production, the advent of sound in motion pictures came with the arrival of The Jazz Singer.

Director Howard Hughes incorporated the new technology into the half-finished film, but Nissen became a casualty of the new sound age, due to her pronounced Norwegian accent. He paid her for her work and cooperation, and replaced her, because her accent would make her role as a British aristocrat ludicrous.

In 1932, she played in The Silent Witness with Weldon Heyburn, who became her first husband. They married on 30 March 1932, in Tijuana, Mexico. On 19 October 1935, Nissen went to court to have the marriage annulled, "charging their marriage ... was illegal and violated legal witness and residence requirements." The annulment was granted on 30 April 1936.

In 1933, she moved to England. Her film career ended in the mid-1930s after she had appeared in a few British films. In 1937, she retired from movie acting altogether.

== Critical acclaim ==
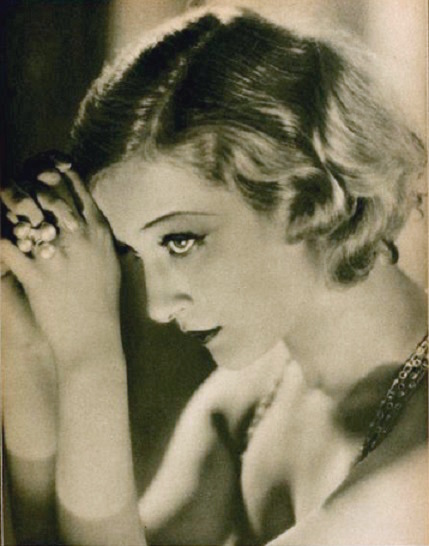
Nissen in 1927

A 1925 New York Times review of the silent film A Norwegian Actress described Nissen as follows:

She was graceful in her movements and expressions, with a constantly changing gaze. The actress was attractive rather than beautiful. Her chin and nose were both somewhat pronounced. Greta's personality was delightful and she never showed an awareness to the audience that she was conscious of being on camera. Her skin was fair and she possessed blonde hair. At different times her coiffure had a somewhat "wild" appearance.

The reviewer believed her hair was more effective when it was brushed down rather than when it was concealed by a small hat. As for her eyes, there was a close affinity in their appearance to those of Sarah Bernhardt. Mordaunt Hall commented on her acting, saying, "Miss Nissen gives a sincere and earnest portrayal, always obtaining excellent results with an originality rarely beheld on the screen".

== Later years and death ==
On 1 June 1941, she married industrialist Stuart D. Eckert (1907–1993), and withdrew from public life. Nissen died at age 82 at her home in Montecito, California of Parkinson's disease on 15 May 1988.

Her husband said she still received fan letters. She had one son, Tor Bruce Nissen Eckert, who, in 2005, donated his large collection of Greta Nissen Memorabilia to the Norwegian Emigrant Museum (Norsk Utvandrermuseum) which is located in Ottestad, Hedmark, Norway.

== Gallery ==
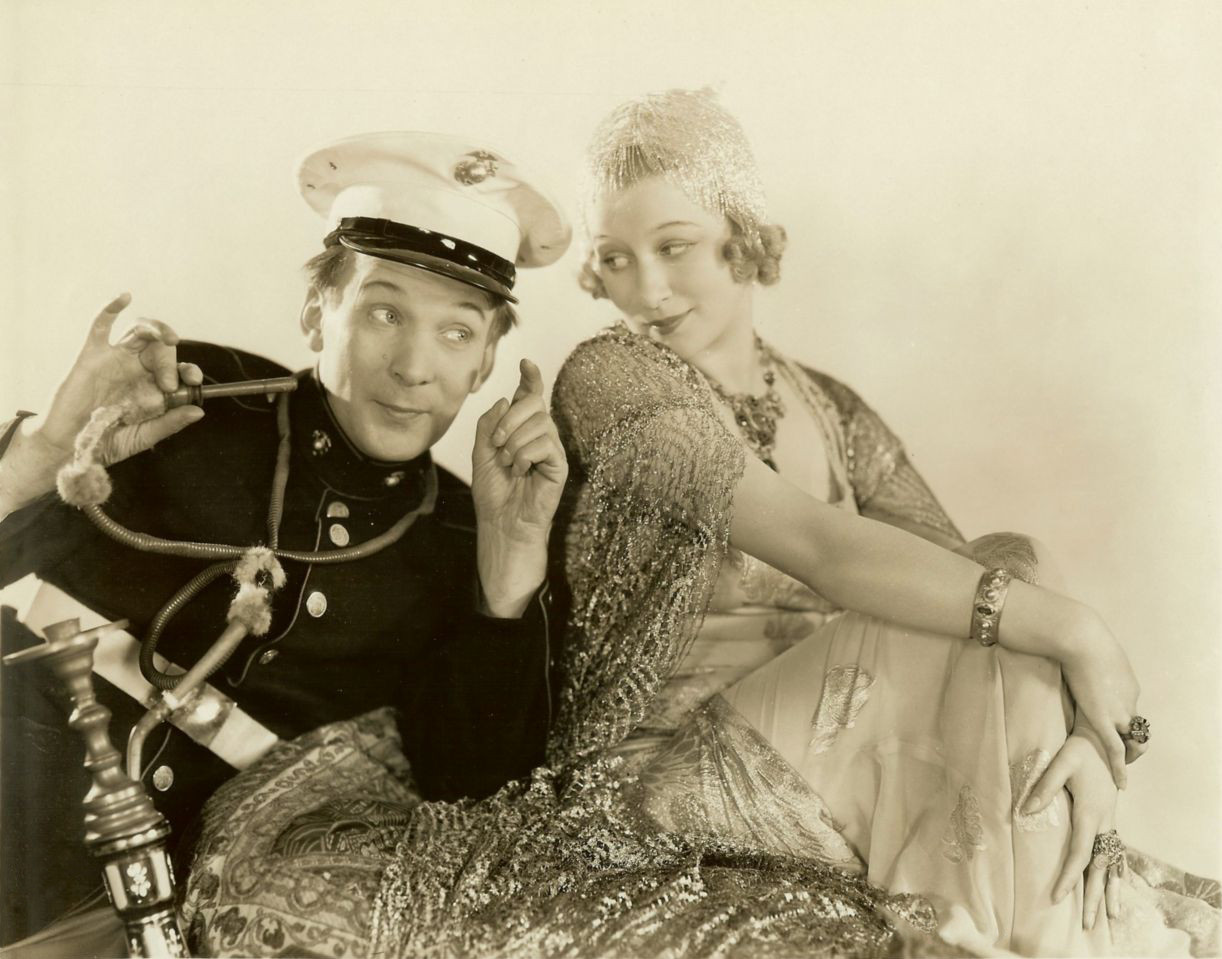
Promotional photo of El Brendel and Greta Nissen for the 1931 comedy film Women of All Nations

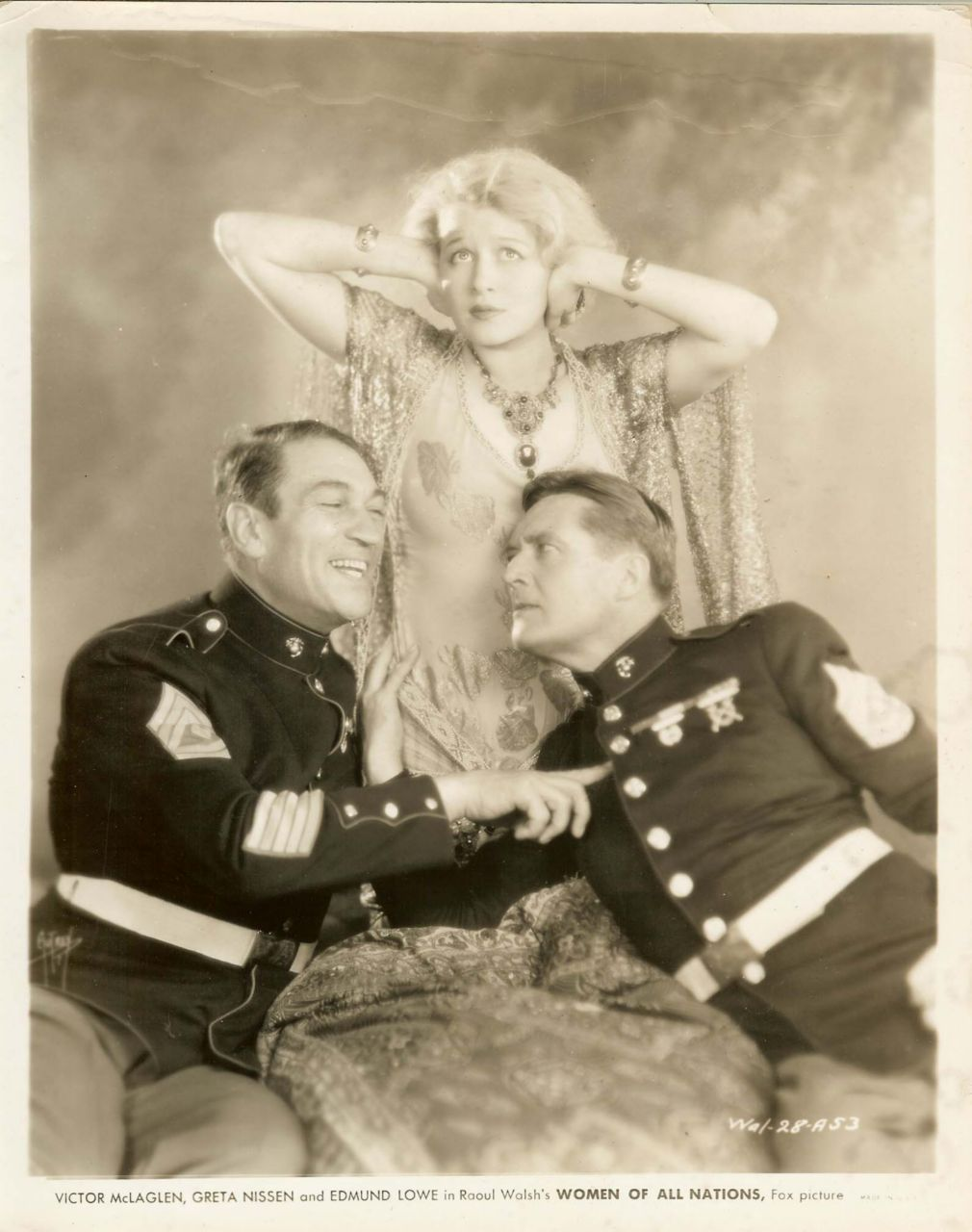
Promotional photo of Nissen, with Victor McLaglen and Edmund Lowe, for the 1931 comedy film Women of All Nations

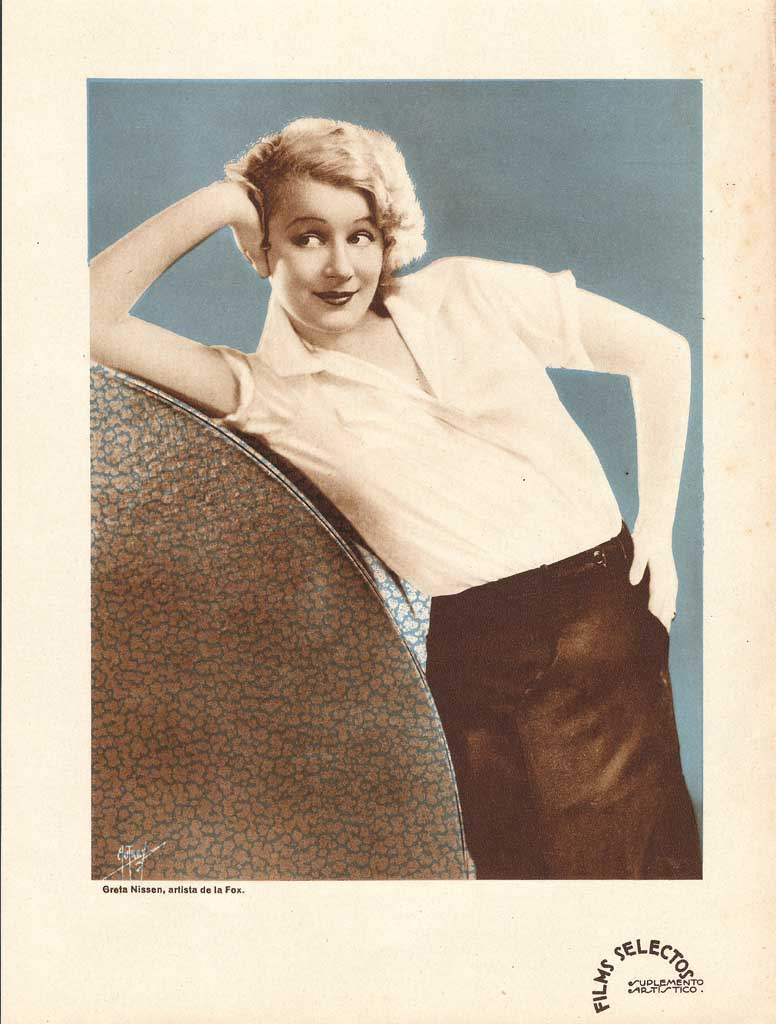
Argentinian magazine cover, 1931

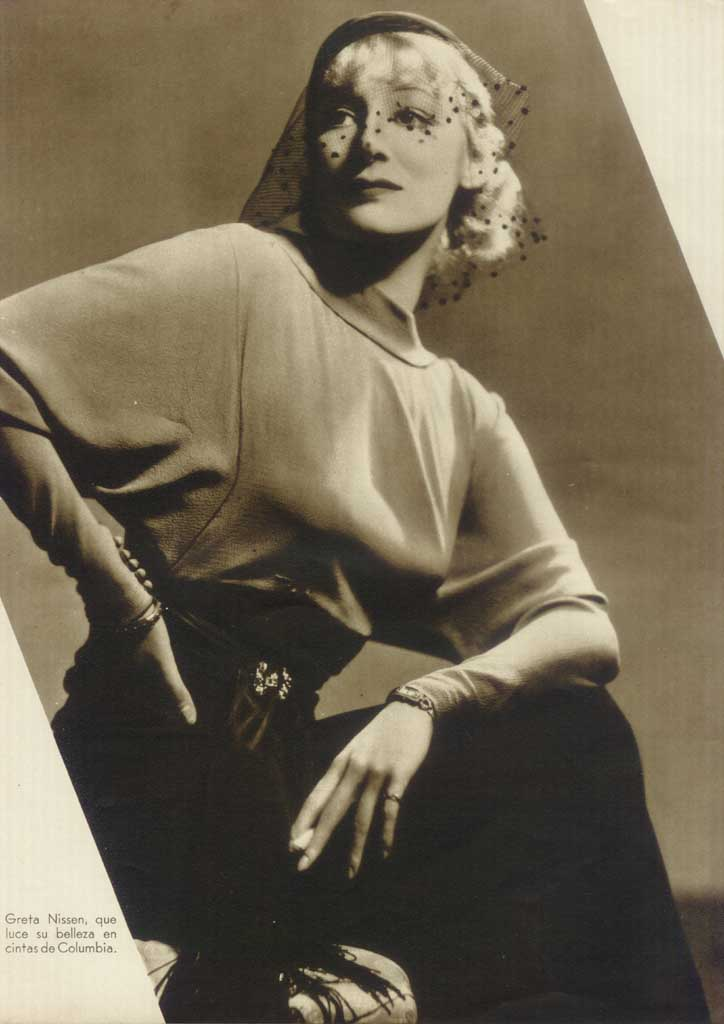
Argentinian magazine photoshoot, 1933

== Filmography ==
- Daarskab, dyd og driverter (1923) - Grethe
- Lille Lise let-paa-taa (1923) - Lise
- Lost: A Wife (1925) - Charlotte Randolph
- In the Name of Love (1925) - Marie Dufrayne
- The Wanderer (1925) - Tisha
- The King on Main Street (1925) - Thérèse Manix
- The Lucky Lady (1926) - Antoinette
- The Love Thief (1926) - Princess Flavia Eugenia Marie
- Ebberöds bank (1926)
- The Lady of the Harem (1926) - Pervaneh
- The Popular Sin (1926) - La Belle Toulaise
- Blonde or Brunette (1927) - Fanny
- Blind Alleys (1927) - Maria d'Alvarez Kirby
- Horse Shoes (1927)
- Fazil (1928) - Fabienne
- The Butter and Egg Man (1928) - Mary Martin
- Women of All Nations (1931) - Elsa
- Transatlantic (1931) - Sigrid Carline
- Ambassador Bill (1931) - Countess Ilka
- Good Sport (1931) - Peggy Bums
- The Silent Witness (1932) - Nora Selmer
- Rackety Rax (1932) - Voine
- The Unwritten Law (1932) - Fifi La Rue
- The Circus Queen Murder (1933) - Josie La Tour
- Melody Cruise (1933) - Elsa Von Rader
- Best of Enemies (1933) - The Blonde
- Life in the Raw (1933) - Belle
- Red Wagon (1933) - Zara
- On Secret Service (1933) - Marchesa Marcella Galdi
- Hired Wife (1934) - Vivian Mathews
- The Luck of a Sailor (1934) - Queen Helena
- Honours Easy (1935) - Ursula Barton
- Cafe Colette (1937) - Vanda Muroff (final film role)
