= Lost: A Wife =

1925 film

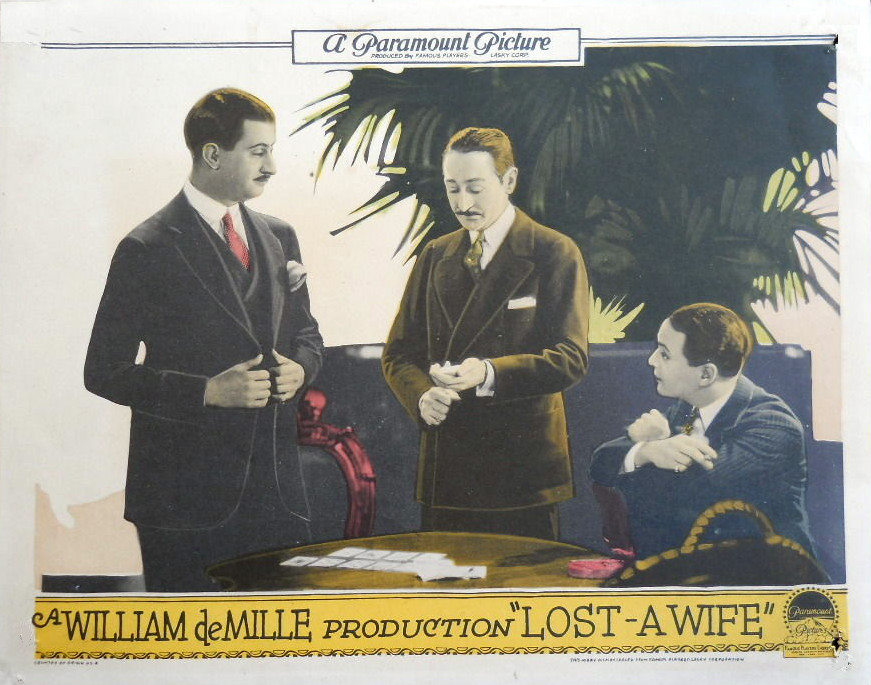
- Lobby card
- Directed by: William C. deMille
- Screenplay by: Clara Beranger
- Based on: Banco by Clare Kummer and Alfred Savoir
- Produced by: Jesse L. Lasky; Adolph Zukor
- Starring: Adolphe Menjou; Greta Nissen; Robert Agnew; Edgar Norton
- Cinematography: L. Guy Wilky
- Production company: Famous Players–Lasky Corporation
- Distributed by: Paramount Pictures
- Release date: July 13, 1925
- Running time: 70 minutes
- Country: United States
- Language: Silent (English intertitles)

Lost: A Wife is a 1925 American silent comedy film directed by William C. deMille and written by Clara Beranger based upon a play by Clare Kummer and Alfred Savoir. The film stars Adolphe Menjou, Greta Nissen, Robert Agnew, Edgar Norton, Mario Carillo, and Genaro Spagnoli. The film was released on July 13, 1925, by Paramount Pictures.

== Plot ==
As described in a film magazine review, Tony Hamilton bets his friends that Charlotte Randolph will not marry the duke that she is engaged to. Later, he wagers that she will marry him. He sweeps her off her feet with his violent love making and marries her that night. Formerly, his love had been for gambling. After their marriage he excuses himself for ten minutes to go to an adjacent room to try his luck at the roulette wheel. There he is induced by an old gambler to win the first battle of their married life or suffer defeat ever after. It results in Tony remaining in the gambling room 75 hours at the roulette wheel. Charlotte remains outside determined not to leave until he is with her, but at the end of that time she decides to leave him. He is called to his father in New York City and she goes to her mother in Paris. A year later he receives word that she has received her final divorce papers and will marry a French count. He speeds to France to prevent the marriage but is too late. He then follows them to the count's estate where he purposely puts his automobile in the ditch. He feigns a broken leg and is taken to home of the count who, not knowing the identity of Tony, asks him to remain in the house. When the count is called to a far corner of the estate by a blaze, Tony confronts Charlotte, telling her that their marriage was never dissolved and that he still loves her. They begin to play a game of cards which lasts all night. His gambling nature is revived and she reviles him, but he promises her that he will never gamble again. The count attempts to prevent the situation from going any further, but his mother enters to say that he does not deserve the young woman. Tony leaves with his bride.

== Cast ==
- Adolphe Menjou as Tony Hamilton
- Greta Nissen as Charlotte Randolph
- Robert Agnew as Dick
- Edgar Norton as Baron Deliguaères
- Mario Carillo as George, Tony's friend
- Genaro Spagnoli as Duke de Val
- Eugenio de Liguoro as Louis, the casino proprietor
- Henrietta Floyd as Mrs. Randolph
- Toby Claude as Baroness, mother of the Baron
- Marcelle Corday as Julie, Charlotte's maid

== Preservation ==
With no prints of Lost: A Wife located in any film archives, it is considered a lost film.
