= The Spaniard (film) =

1925 film

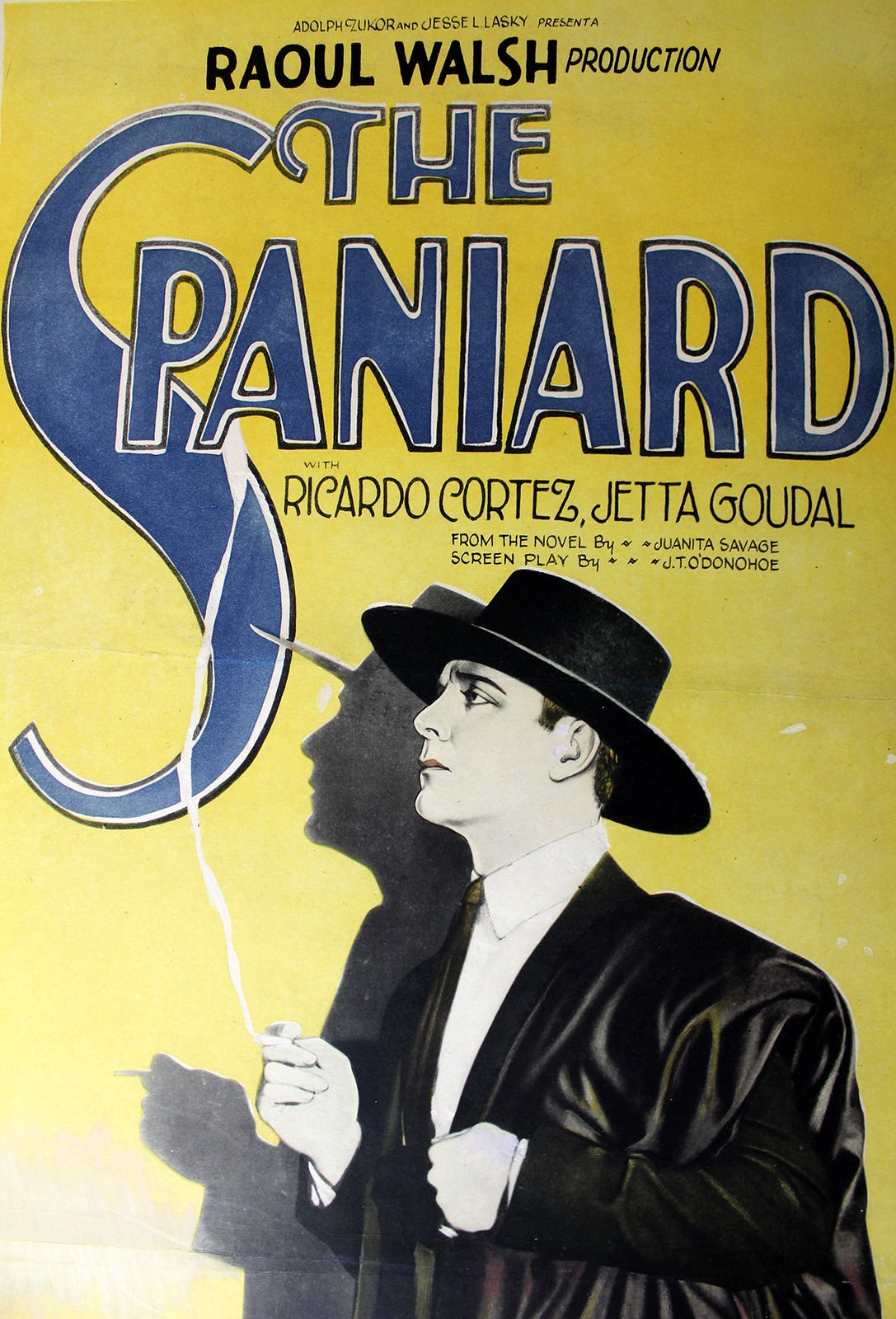
- Directed by: Raoul Walsh
- Screenplay by: Juanita Savage; James T. O'Donohoe
- Produced by: Jesse L. Lasky; Adolph Zukor
- Starring: Ricardo Cortez; Jetta Goudal; Noah Beery, Sr. Mathilde Brundage; Renzo De Gardi; Emily Fitzroy
- Cinematography: Victor Milner
- Production company: Famous Players–Lasky Corporation
- Distributed by: Paramount Pictures
- Release date: May 4, 1925
- Running time: 70 minutes
- Country: United States
- Language: Silent (English intertitles)

The Spaniard is a 1925 American silent drama film directed by Raoul Walsh, written by Juanita Savage and James T. O'Donohoe, and starring Ricardo Cortez, Jetta Goudal, Noah Beery, Sr., Mathilde Brundage, Renzo De Gardi, and Emily Fitzroy. It was released on May 4, 1925, by Paramount Pictures.

== Plot ==
As described in a film magazine review, in England Don Pedro attempts to win the heart of Dolores. She visits a bull fight in Spain and discovers the hero is Don Pedro. Afterwards in a storm, she seeks refuge in a mountain castle, and is then held prisoner by Don Pedro. His valet Gómez tries to win her by aiding her escape. During her escape she is thrown from her horse and is injured. Don Pedro rescues her from Gómez and wins her love. It turns out that he is a grandee of Spain.

== Cast ==
- Ricardo Cortez as Don Pedro de Barrego
- Jetta Goudal as Dolores Annesley
- Noah Beery, Sr. as Gómez
- Mathilde Brundage as Senora de la Carta
- Renzo De Gardi as Count de Albaveque
- Emily Fitzroy as Maria
- Bernard Siegel as Manuel
- Florence Regnart as Consuelo

== Preservation ==
With no prints of The Spaniard located in any film archives, it is a lost film.
