= James T. O'Donohoe =

American screenwriter (1895–1928)

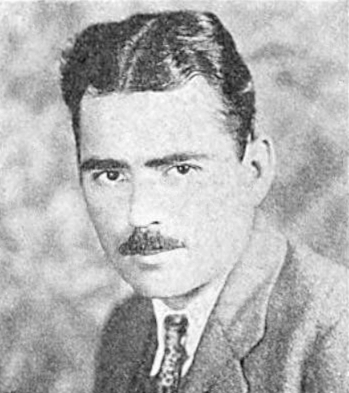
- Born: James Thomas Langton O'Donohoe; March 10, 1895; Manhattan, New York, U.S.
- Died: August 27, 1928 (aged 33); Los Angeles, California, U.S.
- Occupation: Screenwriter
- Years active: 1922–1928
- Spouse: Laska Winter (m. 1924)

James Thomas Langton O'Donohoe (March 10, 1895 – August 27, 1928) was a screenwriter in the early days of Hollywood, during the silent film era.

His films include Kindred of the Dust (1922), The Lucky Lady (1926), What Price Glory? (1926), The Spaniard (1926), Two Arabian Knights (1927), Red Lips (1928), and Show Girl (1928).

== Partial filmography ==
- Serenade (1921)
- Kindred of the Dust (1922)
- The Wanderer (1925)
- The Lucky Lady (1926)
- The Lady of the Harem (1926)
- What Price Glory? (1926)
- The Spaniard (1926)
- The Love Thrill (1927)
- Two Arabian Knights (1927)
- Cheating Cheaters (1927)
- The Noose (1928)
- The Hawk's Nest (1928)
- Show Girl (1928)
