= Sojin (actor) =

Japanese film actor (1884-1954)

Sōjin Kamiyama
- 上山 草人
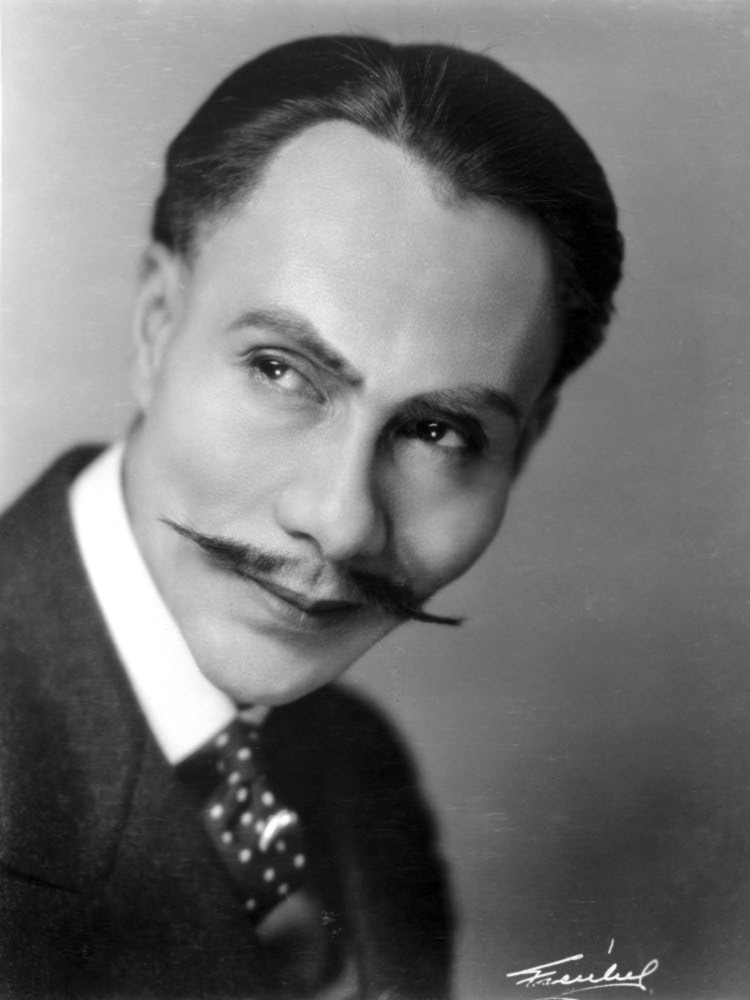
- Born: Mita Tadashi / 三田 貞 30 January 1884; Wakuya, Miyagi, Japan
- Died: 28 July 1954 (aged 70); Setagaya, Tokyo, Japan
- Occupation: Actor
- Years active: 1917–1954
- Spouse: Uraji Yamakawa
- Children: Matsugorō Mita

Several scenes of Sōjin Kamiyama in The Thief of Bagdad

Sōjin Kamiyama (上山 草人, Kamiyama Sōjin) or just Sōjin (草人; 30 January 1884 – 28 July 1954) was a Japanese film actor. He appeared in more than 70 films between 1917 and 1954. He was the subject of a 1995 TV documentary by the Japanese film director Nobuhiro Suwa. He was born in Miyagi, Japan and died in Tokyo, Japan. His wife was actress Uraji Yamakawa.

== Selected filmography ==
- Patria (1917, Serial) - Himself
- The Thief of Bagdad (1924) - The Mongol Prince
- Soft Shoes (1925) - Yet Tzu
- East of Suez (1925) - Lee Tai
- Proud Flesh (1925) - Wong
- The White Desert (1925) - Chinese Cook
- The Wanderer (1925) - Sadyk the Jeweler (uncredited)
- My Lady's Lips (1925)
- The Sea Beast (1926, silent adaptation of Moby Dick) - Fedallah
- The Bat (1926) - Billy - the Butler
- The Lucky Lady (1926) - Secretary to Garletz
- Eve's Leaves (1926) - Le Sing
- The Road to Mandalay (1926) - English Charlie Wing
- Diplomacy (1926) - Chinese Diplomat
- Across the Pacific (1926)
- The Lady of the Harem (1926) - Sultan
- The Sky Pirate (1926)
- Driven from Home (1927)
- All Aboard (1927) - Prince
- The King of Kings (1927) - Prince Of Persia
- The Honorable Mr. Buggs (1927, Short) - The Crook
- Old San Francisco (1927) - Lu Fong (uncredited)
- Foreign Devils (1927) - Lama priest
- The Thirteenth Hour (1927) - Minor Role (uncredited)
- The Chinese Parrot (1927) - Charlie Chan
- The Devil Dancer (1927) - Sadik Lama
- The Haunted Ship (1927) - Bombay Charlie
- Streets of Shanghai (1927) - Fong Kiang
- The Man Without a Face (1928, Serial)
- Something Always Happens (1928) - Chang-Tzo
- The Crimson City (1928) - Sing Yoy
- Chinatown Charlie (1928) - The Mandarin
- The Hawk's Nest (1928) - Himself
- Out with the Tide (1928) - Chee Chee
- Telling the World (1928)
- Ships of the Night (1928) - Yut Sen
- Tropic Madness (1928)
- Manchu Love (1929)
- The Rescue (1929) - Daman
- China Slaver (1929) - Ming Foy / Wing Foy / The Cobra
- Seven Footprints to Satan (1929) - Himself
- Back from Shanghai (1929)
- Careers (1929) - Biwa Player
- Madame X (1929) - Oriental Doctor (uncredited)
- The Unholy Night (1929) - The Mystic
- Painted Faces (1929) - Cafe Owner (uncredited)
- The Show of Shows (1929) - Performer in '$20 Bet' Sketch
- Le spectre vert (1930)
- Golden Dawn (1930) - Piper
- The Dude Wrangler (1930) - Wong
- Way for a Sailor (1930) - Singapore Brothel Proprietor (uncredited)
- Ai yo jinrui to tomo ni are - Zenpen: Nihon hen (1931) - Kôkichi Yamaguchi
- Ai yo jinrui to tomo ni are - Kohen: Beikoku hen (1931)
- Tôjin Okichi (1931)
- Satsueijo romansu, renai annai (1932)
- Riku no wakôdo (1932)
- Chûshingura - Zempen: Akahokyô no maki (1932)
- Chûshingura - Kôhen: Edo no maki (1932) - Kônosuke Kira
- Chûshingura (1932) - Kozukenosuke Kira
- Kanraku no yo wa fukete (1934)
- Yotamono to komachimusume (1935) - Kaheiji
- Maihime no koyomi (1935)
- Dansei tai josei (1936) - Hikoma Okakura
- Hitozuma tsubaki (1936)
- Akanishi Kakita (1936) - Aki
- Hanayome karuta (1937) - Fortuneteller
- Konjiki yasha (1937) - Naoyuki Wanibuchi
- Hitozuma shinju (1938) - Kenzô
- Kokumin no chikai (1938)
- Gonin no kyodai (1939) - Kiyooka
- Utau noriai basha (1939) - Matsuzô
- Mazushiki mono no kofuku (1939) - Sakuzo Nakata
- Musume tazunete sanzen-ri (1940) - Popeye no Genzô
- Kurama Tengu (1942) - Jacob
- Kaizokuki futtobu (1943)
- Kokusai mitsuyu-dan (1944)
- Ôedo no oni (1947)
- Ryûgantô no himitsu (1950)
- Muteki (1952)
- Seven Samurai (1954) - the blind musician
- Samurai I: Musashi Miyamoto (1954)
