= The Crimson City =

1928 film by Archie Mayo

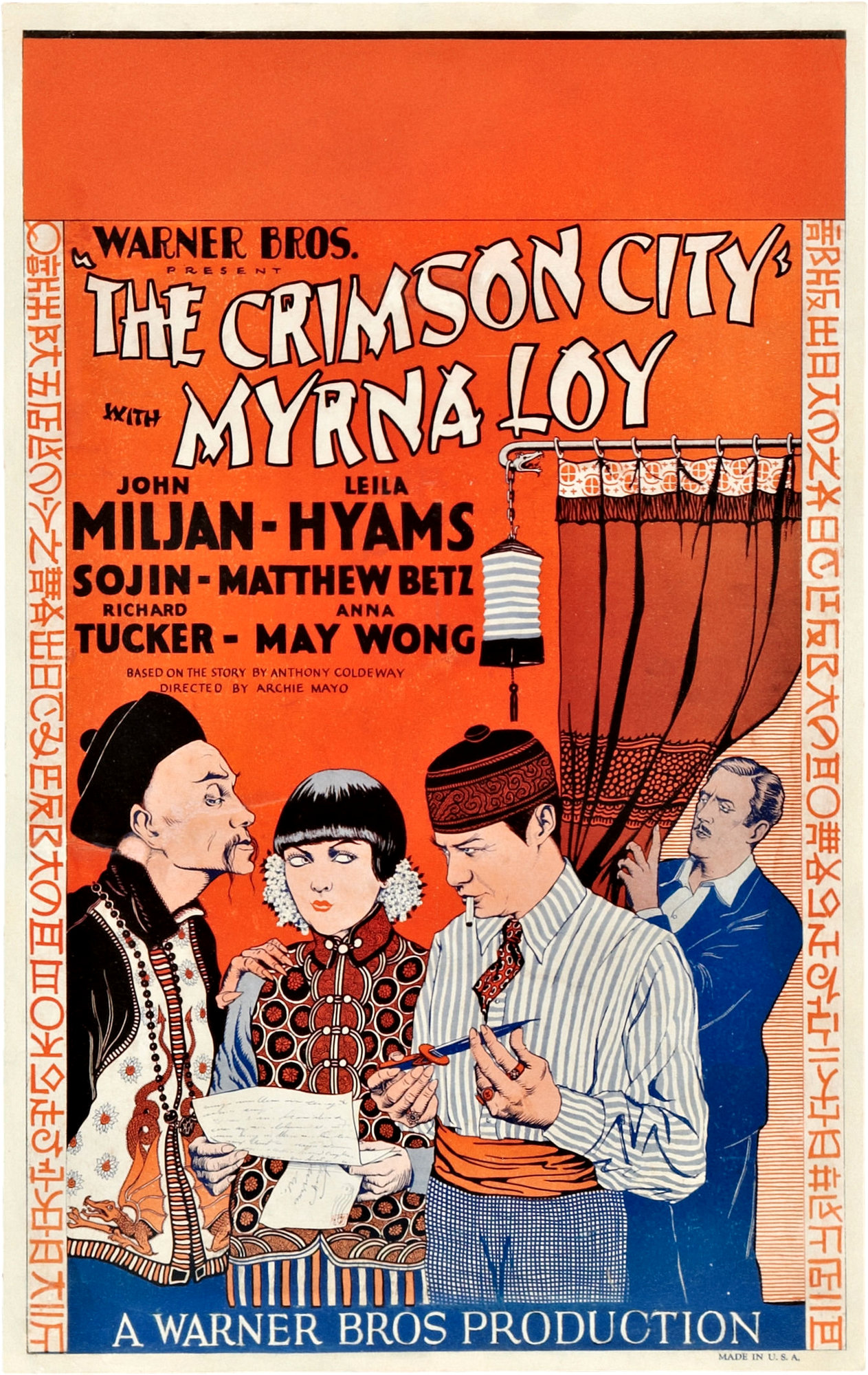
- Theatrical release poster
- Directed by: Archie Mayo
- Written by: Anthony Coldeway (orig. story & scenario); James A. Starr (intertitles)
- Starring: Myrna Loy; John Miljan; Leila Hyams; Anna May Wong
- Cinematography: Barney McGill
- Production company: Warner Bros. Pictures
- Distributed by: Warner Bros. Pictures
- Release date: April 7, 1928
- Running time: 6 reels; at 5,388 feet
- Country: United States
- Languages: Sound (Synchronized) (English Intertitles)

The Crimson City is a 1928 American synchronized sound drama film written by Anthony Coldeway and directed by Archie Mayo. The film stars Myrna Loy, Anna May Wong, Sōjin Kamiyama, John Miljan, Leila Hyams, and Richard Tucker. While the film has no audible dialog, it was released with a synchronized musical score with sound effects using the sound-on-disc Vitaphone process. The film was released by Warner Bros. Pictures on April 7, 1928.

== Plot ==
Richard Brand, manager of the Anglo-Oriental oil fields in China, entertains Major Howells and his daughter Nadine, whom Brand hopes to marry. Nadine's former fiancé, Gregory Kent, a young English aristocrat wrongfully charged with embezzlement, has fled England and found refuge in China. Though innocent, Kent lacks the courage to seek out Nadine, knowing she is now with Brand.

Kent visits the infamous House of a Thousand Daggers, a notorious waterfront resort run by Ronald Foo ("Dagger Foo"). Here, Onoto, a slave girl promised by Foo to the wealthy Chinese magnate Sin Yoy, attempts to escape but is captured and brutally tortured. Kent intervenes, asserting his authority and insisting Onoto be allowed to sit at his table while he orders food.

Tyler Jordan arrives from England bearing documents that prove Kent's innocence. Brand bargains with Foo for the papers, and Kent is sent to steal them, with the agreement that Onoto will be freed as a reward. Onoto discovers that the documents concern Kent. After a fierce struggle with Foo, Kent recovers what he believes to be his pardon and immediately returns to Brand's home. However, the envelope he presents to Nadine's father contains only blank paper.

Onoto then appears before the group, declaring her love for Kent and pleading that they allow him to go with her. Slowly, Kent turns to follow Onoto. Realizing the hopelessness of her love, Onoto hands over the real proof of Kent's innocence—documents she had stolen herself—to Nadine.

With the truth revealed, Nadine joyfully embraces Gregory, while Onoto quietly slips away on sand-silenced feet into the shadows, returning to the House of a Thousand Daggers.

== Cast ==
- Myrna Loy as Onoto
- John Miljan as Gregory Kent
- Leila Hyams as Nadine Howells
- Matthew Betz as "Dagger Foo"
- Anders Randolf as Major Howells
- Sōjin Kamiyama as Sin Yoy
- Anna May Wong as Su
- Richard Tucker as Richard Brand

== Preservation status ==
The only known surviving copy is kept at the Museo del Cine Pablo Ducros Hicken in Buenos Aires, Argentina. A trailer for this film survives among the holdings of the Library of Congress.

== See also ==
- List of early sound feature films (1926–1929)
