= Something Always Happens (1928 film) =

1928 film

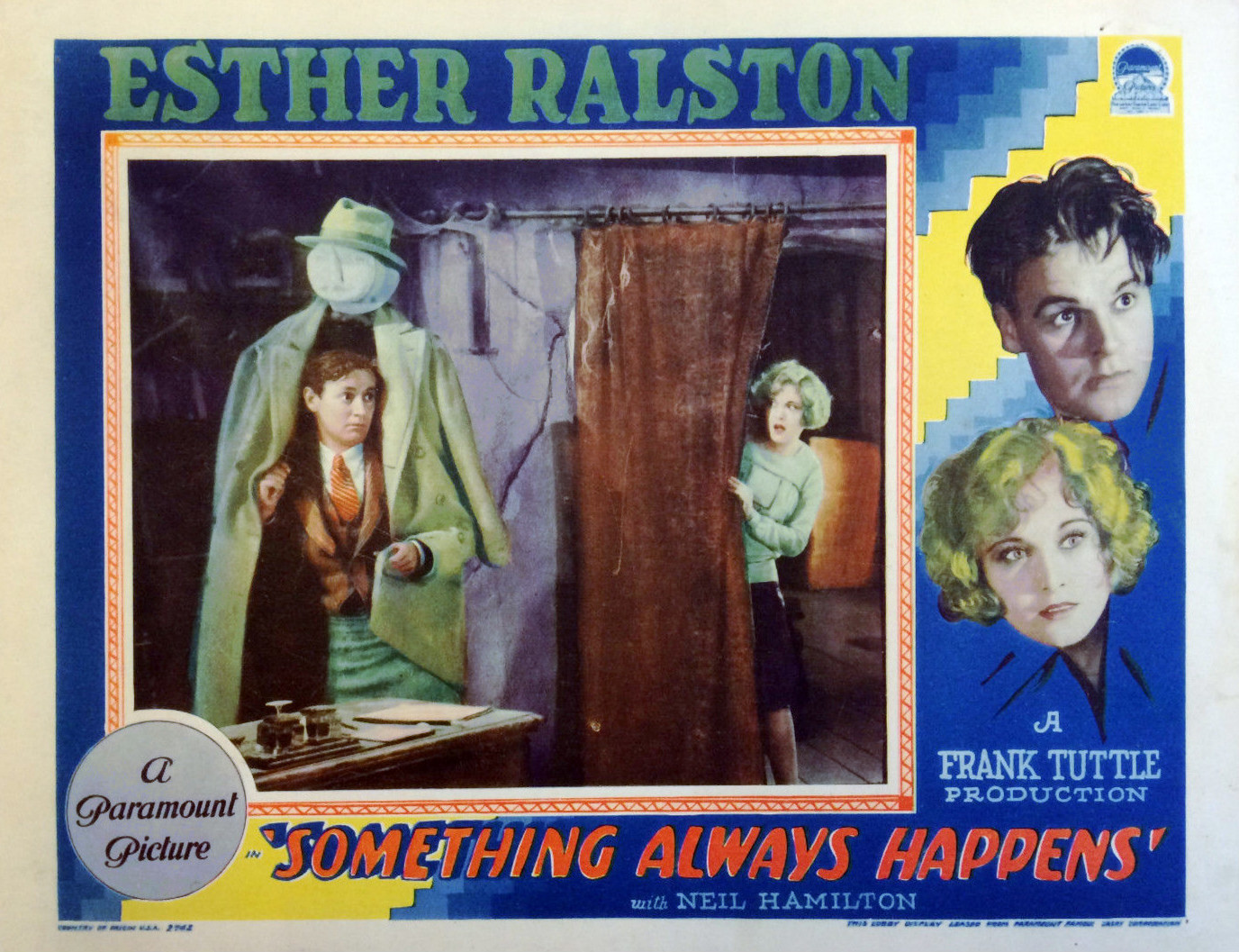
- Lobby card
- Directed by: Frank Tuttle
- Screenplay by: Raymond Cannon; Herman J. Mankiewicz; Florence Ryerson; Frank Tuttle
- Produced by: Jesse L. Lasky; Adolph Zukor
- Starring: Esther Ralston; Neil Hamilton; Sôjin Kamiyama; Charles Sellon
- Cinematography: J. Roy Hunt
- Edited by: Verna Willis
- Production company: Famous Players–Lasky Corporation
- Distributed by: Paramount Pictures
- Release date: March 24, 1928
- Running time: 55 minutes
- Country: United States
- Language: Silent (English intertitles)

Something Always Happens is a 1928 American silent comedy horror film, directed by Frank Tuttle and starring Esther Ralston. The plot was the work of director Frank Tuttle, from which the screenplay was written by Florence Ryerson and Raymond Cannon, and the subtitles were provided by Herman J. Mankiewicz. The supporting cast features Neil Hamilton, Sôjin Kamiyama, Charles Sellon, Roscoe Karns, Lawrence Grant, and Mischa Auer. The picture was released on March 24, 1928, by Paramount Pictures. It is not known whether the film survives, or who holds the rights.

The Oriental character played by Sôjin Kamiyama in the film resembled Fu Manchu, not surprising as Sax Rohmer's Fu Manchu character was very popular among filmgoers in 1928. Japanese actor Sojin played similar horror roles in The Bat (1926), The Unholy Night (1929) and Seven Footprints to Satan (1929). This film should not be confused with the 1934 sound film of the same title.

In the film, an Englishman arranges for his fiancée to spend the night in a haunted house. He hopes to end her thrill-seeking, but he has unwittingly send her to the mansion of a criminal mastermind from the Orient.

== Plot ==
A thrill-seeking socialite named Diana Mallory is engaged to marry a bland, very proper Englishman named Roderick Keswick. Keswick wants to purge Diana of her thrill-seeking ways, so he arranges for her to spend a night in a haunted house in order to frighten the audacity out of her. Unbeknownst to Keswick, the old mansion is being used as a hideout for an Oriental criminal mastermind named Chang-Tzo, and Diana winds up having the adventure of her life. The house sports some weird characters, one of which is referred to in the film as "The Thing" (Noble Johnson).

== Cast ==
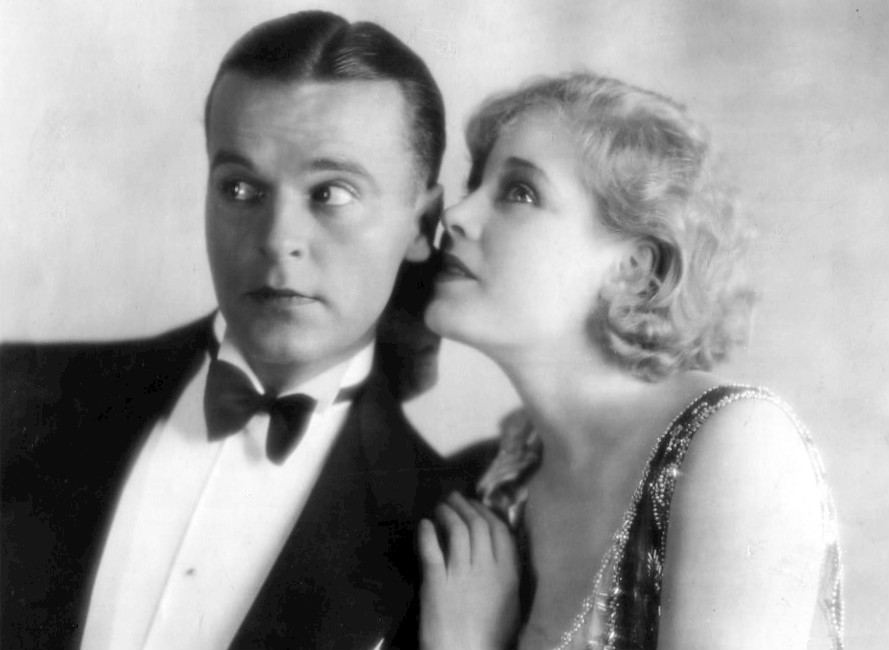
Neil Hamilton and Esther Ralston

- Esther Ralston as Diana Mallory
- Neil Hamilton as Roderick Keswick
- Sôjin Kamiyama as Chang-Tzo
- Charles Sellon as Perkins
- Roscoe Karns as George
- Lawrence Grant as The Earl of Rochester
- Mischa Auer as Clark
- Noble Johnson as The Thing
- Vera Lewis as Gräfin Agathe
- George Y. Harvey as Scotland Yard Inspector (uncredited)
