= Blonde or Brunette =

1927 film by Richard Rosson

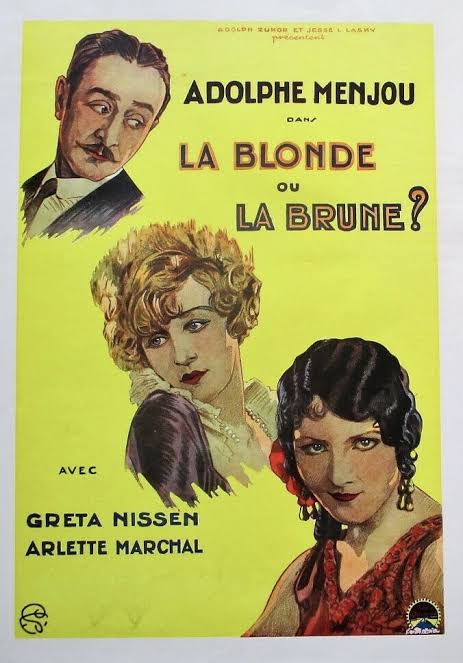
- French release poster
- Directed by: Richard Rosson
- Written by: John McDermott; George Marion Jr. (titles)
- Produced by: B. P. Schulberg
- Starring: Adolphe Menjou
- Cinematography: Victor Milner
- Production company: Famous Players–Lasky
- Distributed by: Paramount Pictures
- Release date: January 8, 1927
- Running time: 60 minutes
- Country: United States
- Language: Silent (English intertitles)

Blonde or Brunette is a surviving 1927 American silent comedy film directed by Richard Rosson, produced by Famous Players–Lasky and released by Paramount Pictures. It stars Adolphe Menjou, Greta Nissen and Arlette Marchal.

== Plot ==
In France, Henri Martel, living in a small town, marries blonde Fanny. A businessman, Henri must travel out of town and, on one occasion, returns to find his young wife drinking, smoking cigarettes, and dancing. Her behavioral shift is due to her befriending a brunette named Blanche. Dissatisfied with her change, the couple are soon divorced and Henri decides to marry Blanche. Henri finds his life with Blanche unsatisfactory but is unable to reconcile with Fanny.

== Legacy ==
In the early years of the 20th century, the public was fascinated by comparing the respective behaviors of blonde and brunette women, particularly with regards to their sexual temperaments. Films such as Blonde or Brunette and Gentlemen Prefer Blondes capitalized on that fascination.

A copy of Blonde or Brunette is held at the Library of Congress.

== Cast ==
- Adolphe Menjou as Henri Martel
- Greta Nissen as Fanny
- Arlette Marchal as Blanche
- Mary Carr as Grandmother
- Evelyn Sherman as Mother-in-Law
- Emile Chautard as Father-in-Law
- Paul Weigel as Butler
- Henry Sedley as Turney
- Andre Lanoy as Hubert
- Henri Menjou as Detective

== See also ==
- Blonde versus brunette rivalry
