= The Devil Dancer =

1927 film

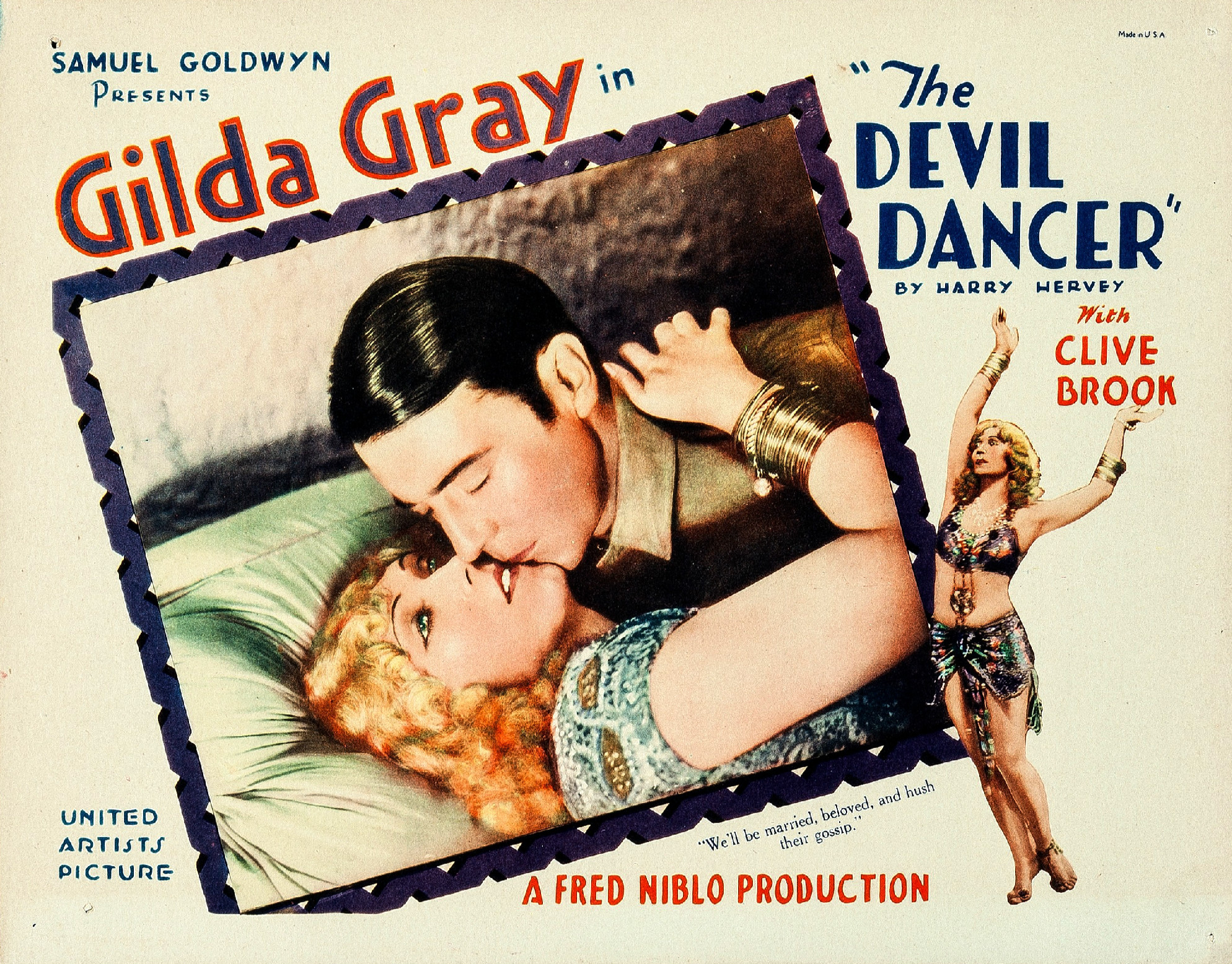
- Lobby card
- Directed by: Fred Niblo
- Written by: Alice D. G. Miller (screenplay); Edwin Justus Mayer (intertitles)
- Story by: Harry Hervey
- Produced by: Samuel Goldwyn
- Starring: Gilda Gray; Clive Brook; Anna May Wong
- Cinematography: George Barnes; Thomas Brannigan
- Production company: Samuel Goldwyn Productions
- Distributed by: United Artists
- Release date: November 19, 1927
- Running time: 73 minutes
- Country: United States
- Language: Silent (English intertitles)

The Devil Dancer is a 1927 American silent romantic drama film directed by Fred Niblo and produced by Samuel Goldwyn. The film stars Gilda Gray.

For his work on this film, The Magic Flame and Sadie Thompson, cinematographer George Barnes was nominated for the first Academy Award for Best Cinematography at the 1st Academy Awards ceremony in 1929.

== Cast ==
- Gilda Gray as Takla (The Devil Dancer)
- Clive Brook as Stephen Athelstan
- Anna May Wong as Sada
- Serge Temoff as Beppo
- Michael Vavitch as Hassim
- Sōjin Kamiyama as Sadik Lama
- Anne Schaefer as Tana
- Albert Conti as Arnold Guthrie
- Martha Mattox as Isabel
- Kalla Pasha as Toy
- James B. Leong as The Grand Lama
- William H. Tooker as Lathrop
- Claire Du Brey as Audrey
- Nora Cecil as Julia
- Barbara Tennant as The White Woman
- Herbert Evans (uncredited minor part)
- Jack Harvey (uncredited minor part)
- Ura Mita (uncredited minor part)
- Clarissa Selwynne (uncredited minor part)

== Preservation ==
The Devil Dancer is now considered a lost film.
