= The Wanderer (1925 film) =

1925 film directed by Raoul Walsh

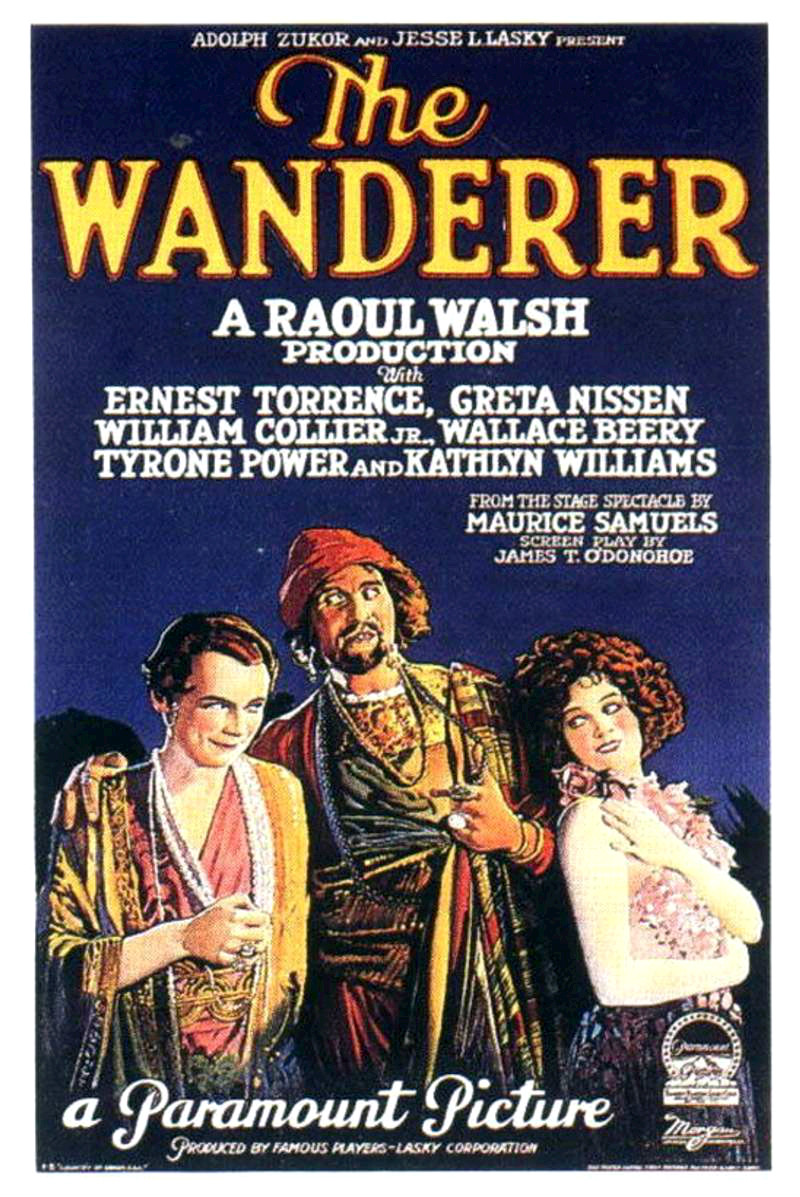
- Film poster
- Directed by: Raoul Walsh
- Written by: James T. O'Donohoe
- Based on: The Wanderer (play) by Maurice Samuel and Wilhelm August Schmidtbonn
- Produced by: Adolph Zukor; Jesse Lasky
- Starring: Greta Nissen; Wallace Beery; Tyrone Power Sr.
- Cinematography: Victor Milner
- Music by: Hugo Riesenfeld
- Distributed by: Paramount Pictures
- Release dates: June 1925 (Germany); August 19, 1925 (USA)
- Running time: 90 minutes
- Country: United States
- Language: Silent (English intertitles)

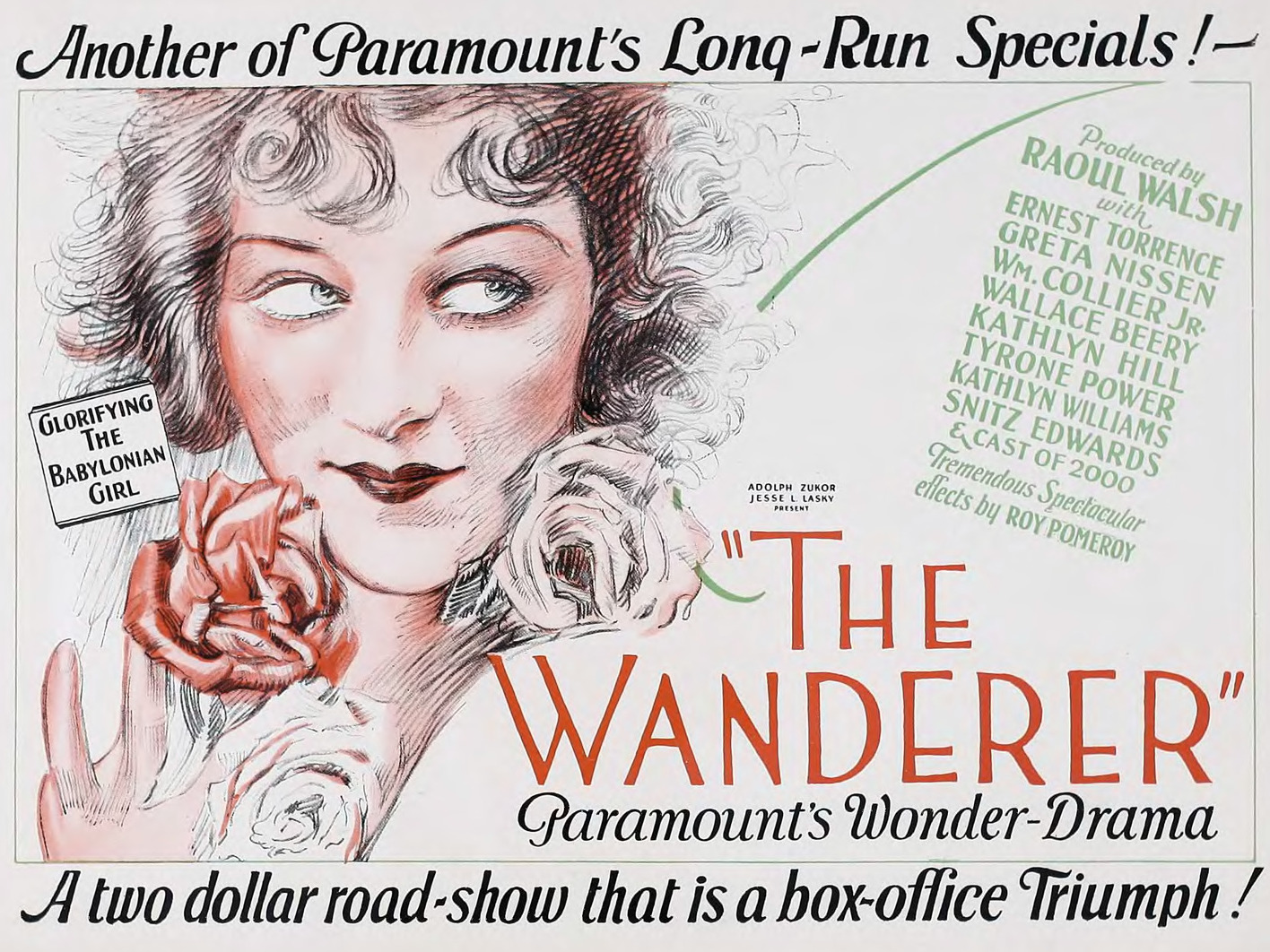
The Wanderer 1925 advertisement

The Wanderer is a 1925 American silent drama film directed by Raoul Walsh and starring Greta Nissen, Wallace Beery, and Tyrone Power Sr. It was distributed by Paramount Pictures.

== Plot ==
As described in a film magazine reviews, Jether is a shepherd living in a rural village with his family somewhere in the ancient MIddle East. They worship one God. Jether is bored with his life and longs for the excitement of the city. After receiving his inheritance from his father, Jether joins a caravan traveling to the city. While in the caravan, he forms a relationship with Tisha, a priestess of the goddess Ishtar.

While in the city, Jether spends his money gambling and buying fine clothes and jewels for Tisha. He receives a divine warning that the city will be destroyed, but he ignores it. However, Jether will not deny his God. When his money runs out, Tisha dumps him. While a grand feast is being held for Tisha, God destroys the city.

Tisha dies in the catastrophe, but Jether escapes with his life. While traveling home, he works as a swineherd for a rich man, subsisting on the leftovers of the pigs' food. When Jether finally reaches his family's home, his father welcomes him back to the family.

== Cast ==
- Greta Nissen as Tisha (credited as Grete Ruzt-Nissen)
- William Collier Jr. as Jether
- Ernest Torrence as Tola
- Wallace Beery as Pharis
- Tyrone Power Sr. as Jesse (credited as Tyrone Power)
- Kathryn Carver as Naomi (credited as Kathryn Hill)
- Kathlyn Williams as Huldah
- George Regas as Gaal (credited as George Rigas)
- Holmes Herbert as Prophet
- Snitz Edwards as Jeweler
- Lillian Butterfield as Girl at Baccanal (uncredited)
- Sôjin Kamiyama as Sadyk the Jeweler (uncredited)
- Melva Lockhart as Girl at Baccanal (uncredited)
- Myrna Loy as Girl at Baccanal (uncredited)
- Helen Virgil as Girl at Baccanal (uncredited)

== Preservation ==
An incomplete print of the film survives.
