= Ships of the Night =

1928 film

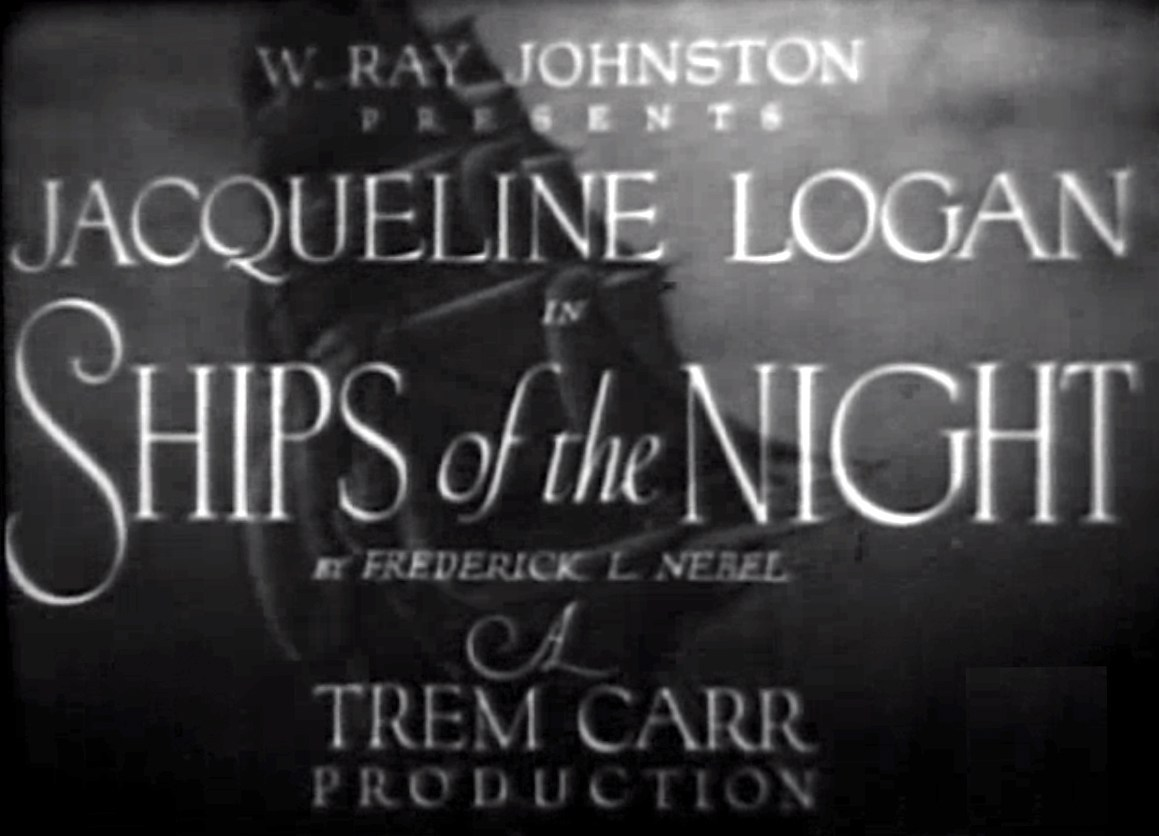
- Directed by: Duke Worne
- Written by: Arthur Hoerl; Frederick Nebel
- Produced by: Trem Carr
- Starring: Jacqueline Logan; Sôjin Kamiyama; Jack Mower
- Cinematography: Hap Depew
- Edited by: J.S. Harrington
- Production company: Trem Carr Pictures
- Distributed by: Rayart Pictures
- Release date: November 27, 1928
- Running time: 62 minutes
- Country: United States
- Languages: Silent; English intertitles

Ships of the Night is a 1928 American silent adventure film directed by Duke Worne and starring Jacqueline Logan, Sôjin Kamiyama and Jack Mower.

== Cast ==
- Jacqueline Logan as Johanna Hearne
- Sôjin Kamiyama as Yut Sen
- Jack Mower as Dan Meloy
- Andy Clyde as Alec
- Arthur Rankin as Donald Hearne
- Glen Cavender as Cramsey
- Thomas A. Curran as Chief of Police
- Frank Lanning as Moja
- J.P. McGowan as Motilla
- Frank Moran as First Mate

== Bibliography ==
- Palmer, Scott. British Film Actors' Credits, 1895-1987. McFarland, 1988.
