= The Lady of the Harem =

1926 film

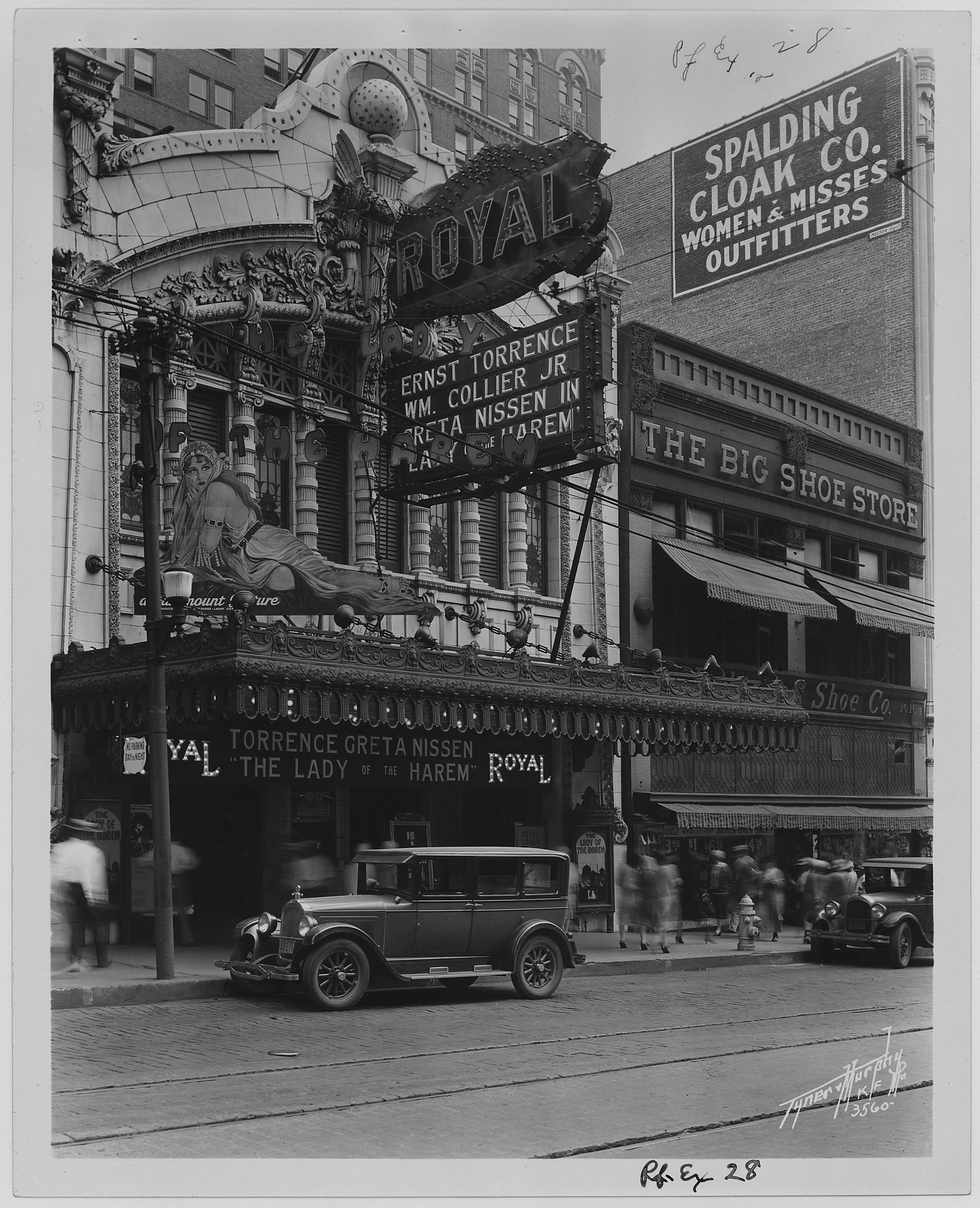
- The Royal Theater in Kansas City showing the film
- Directed by: Raoul Walsh
- Screenplay by: James Elroy Flecker; James T. O'Donohoe
- Produced by: Jesse L. Lasky; Adolph Zukor
- Starring: Ernest Torrence; William Collier Jr. Greta Nissen; Louise Fazenda; George Beranger; Sôjin Kamiyama; Frank Leigh
- Cinematography: Victor Milner
- Production company: Famous Players–Lasky Corporation
- Distributed by: Paramount Pictures
- Release date: November 1, 1926
- Running time: 60 minutes
- Country: United States
- Language: Silent (English intertitles)

The Lady of the Harem is a 1926 American silent adventure film directed by Raoul Walsh and written by James Elroy Flecker and James T. O'Donohoe. The film stars Ernest Torrence, William Collier Jr., Greta Nissen, Louise Fazenda, George Beranger, Sôjin Kamiyama, and Frank Leigh. The film was released on November 1, 1926, by Paramount Pictures. It also had the alternative title The Golden Voyage.

== Plot ==
As described in a film magazine review, the gold-greedy sultan in levying taxes seizes the daughter of one of his subjects in lieu of money and carries her to his harem. The youth she loves is captured while attempting her rescue, but a friend he has made in the royal city rescues him and the girl. In turn, he is elevated to the ruling seat following the death of the tyrant.

== Cast ==
- Ernest Torrence as Hassan
- William Collier Jr. as Rafi
- Greta Nissen as Pervaneh
- Louise Fazenda as Yasmin
- George Beranger as Selim
- Sôjin Kamiyama as Sultan
- Frank Leigh as Jafar
- Noble Johnson as Tax Collector
- Daniel Makarenko as Chief of Police
- Christian J. Frank as Captain of the Military
- Snitz Edwards as Abdu
- Chester Conklin as Ali
- Brandon Hurst as Beggar
- Leo White as Beggar

== Preservation ==
With no prints of The Lady of the Harem located in any film archives, it is a lost film.
