= Toboggan (film) =

1934 film

- Directed by: Henri Decoin
- Written by: Henri Decoin
- Produced by: Pierre Geoffroy
- Starring: Georges Carpentier; Arlette Marchal; Raymond Cordy
- Cinematography: Léonce-Henri Burel
- Edited by: Marguerite Beaugé
- Music by: Philippe Parès
- Production company: Gaumont-Franco Film-Aubert
- Distributed by: Gaumont-Franco Film-Aubert
- Release date: 30 March 1934
- Running time: 90 minutes
- Country: France
- Language: French

Toboggan is a 1934 French sports drama film directed by Henri Decoin and starring Georges Carpentier, Arlette Marchal and Raymond Cordy. It was voted amongst the most popular films of the year by readers of the Pour Vous magazine. The film's sets were designed by the art director Jean Lafitte.

== Cast ==
- Georges Carpentier as Georges Romanet
- Arlette Marchal as Lisa
- Raymond Cordy as Patte de Quinquina
- Paul Amiot as Anderson
- Sophie Duval as Betty
- John Anderson as Billy Sanders
- Marcel Maupi as Le chasseur
- François Descamps as le soigneur

== Bibliography ==
- Bessy, Maurice & Chirat, Raymond. Histoire du cinéma français: 1929-1934. Pygmalion, 1986.
- Crisp, Colin. Genre, Myth and Convention in the French Cinema, 1929-1939. Indiana University Press, 2002.
- Rège, Philippe. Encyclopedia of French Film Directors, Volume 1. Scarecrow Press, 2009.
