= The Lucky Lady =

1926 film by Raoul Walsh

- Still with Greta Nissen
- Directed by: Raoul Walsh
- Written by: James T. O'Donohoe; Robert E. Sherwood
- Story by: Bertram Bloch
- Produced by: Adolph Zukor; Jesse L. Lasky; Raoul Walsh
- Starring: Greta Nissen; Lionel Barrymore
- Cinematography: Victor Milner
- Distributed by: Paramount Pictures
- Release date: April 26, 1926
- Running time: 6 reels
- Country: United States
- Language: Silent (English intertitles)

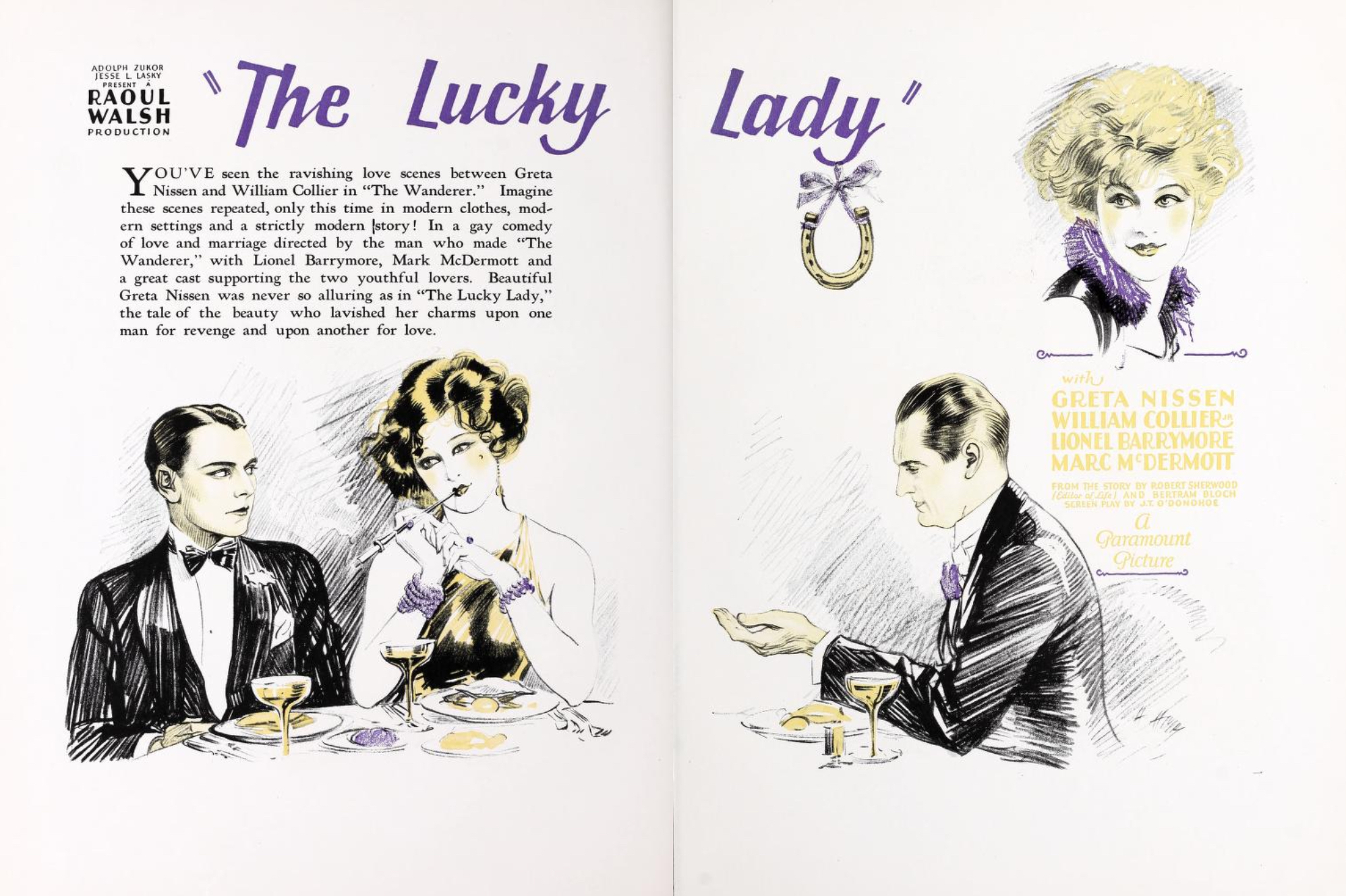
1925 advertisement

The Lucky Lady is a 1926 American silent romance film produced by Famous Players–Lasky, distributed by Paramount Pictures, directed by Raoul Walsh, and starring Greta Nissen, Lionel Barrymore, William Collier Jr., and Marc McDermott.

Walsh and Barrymore and their families knew each other going back to their adolescence in the Victorian era of the 1880s and 1890s.

== Plot ==
As described in a film magazine review, this is a tale of a beauty who lavished her charms upon one man for revenge and upon another for love. It happens in a mythical kingdom where a lovely princess is chafing against the restraint of a convent. She sneaks away, meets a young American man, flirts with him, and falls in love. At the same time, she poses as an alluring vampire and flirts with the wild-living nobleman whom she is supposed to marry but does not love. The prime minister, fearing for the marriage plans of the nobleman and the princess, banishes the young American and the vampire, who is really the princess. The two journey to America and live happily ever afterwards.

== Cast ==
- Greta Nissen as Antoinette
- Lionel Barrymore as Count Ferranzo
- William Collier, Jr. as Clarke
- Marc McDermott as Franz Garletz
- Carrie Daumery as Duchess (credited as Madame Daumery)
- Sōjin Kamiyama as Secretary to Garletz (credited as Sojin)
- Scotty Mattraw as German at Casino Dance (uncredited)

== Preservation ==
Contrary to some sources, The Lucky Lady is not a lost film. A print survives in the Library of Congress.

== See also ==
- Lionel Barrymore filmography
