= The Silent Witness (1932 film) =

American mystery film

- Directed by: Marcel Varnel
- Written by: Jack DeLeon (play); Jack Celestin (play); Douglas Z. Doty
- Starring: Lionel Atwill; Greta Nissen; Helen Mack
- Cinematography: Joseph H. August
- Edited by: Jack Murray
- Production company: Fox Film Corporation
- Distributed by: Fox Film Corporation
- Release date: February 7, 1932
- Running time: 73 minutes
- Country: United States
- Language: English

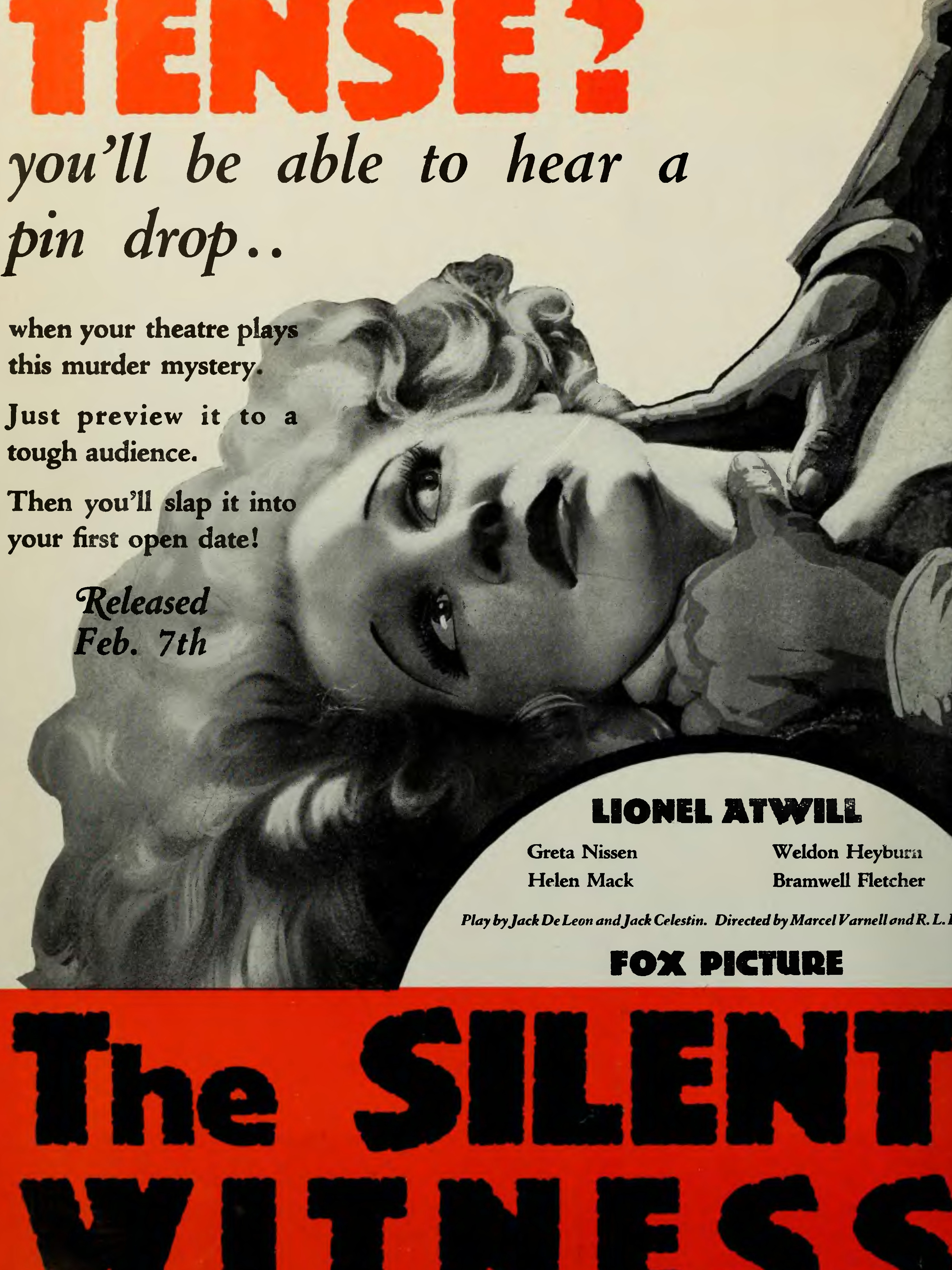
The Silent Witness ad in The Film Daily (1932)

The Silent Witness is a 1932 American mystery film directed by Marcel Varnel and starring Lionel Atwill, Greta Nissen, and Helen Mack. It was adapted from a play by Jack DeLeon and Jack Celestin. The film's sets were designed by the art director Duncan Cramer who worked on many Fox Film productions of the era.

== Plot ==
An Englishman takes the blame for his son who he believes guilty of murdering his lover. The real truth surrounding the case is only revealed by a silent witness.

== Cast ==
- Lionel Atwill as Sir Austin Howard
- Greta Nissen as Nora Selmer
- Weldon Heyburn as Carl Blake
- Helen Mack as Sylvia Pierce
- Bramwell Fletcher as Anthony Howard
- Mary Forbes as Lady Howard
- C. Montague Shaw as Inspector Robbins
- Wyndham Standing as Sir John Lawson, Barrister
- Alan Mowbray as Arthur Drinton
- Herbert Mundin as Henry Hammer
- Billy Bevan as Horace Ward
- Lumsden Hare as Colonel Grayson

== Release ==
International Photographer, which gave the film a good review, posited that Atwill might be a hard sell to movie audiences despite his obvious talent and years of stage experience: "The difficulty of the exhibitor will be to get his patrons to see Atwill. Once he has them started the rest will be easy."

== Critical Response ==
International Photographer described the film as playing more like a stage production than a film but still called it "gripping."

== Bibliography ==
- Goble, Alan. The Complete Index to Literary Sources in Film. Walter de Gruyter, 1999.
- Turim, Maureen. Flashbacks in Film: Memory & History. Routledge, 2013.
