= The Ideal Woman (1934 film) =

1934 film

- Directed by: André Berthomieu
- Written by: André Berthomieu
- Based on: La Meilleure Maîtresse by Georges Oudard
- Produced by: Emile Dereumaux
- Starring: René Lefèvre; Marie Glory; Arlette Marchal
- Cinematography: Jacques Montéran
- Edited by: Marcel Cravenne
- Music by: Georges Van Parys
- Production company: Films de France
- Release date: 19 January 1934
- Running time: 98 minutes
- Country: France
- Language: French

The Ideal Woman (French: La femme idéale) is a 1934 French comedy film directed by André Berthomieu and starring René Lefèvre, Marie Glory and Arlette Marchal. It is based on the novel La Meilleure Maîtresse by Georges Oudard. The film's sets were designed by the art director Jean d'Eaubonne.

== Synopsis ==
The shy librarian Grégoire has to listen to his colleague constantly bragging about what an accomplished womaniser he is. While on holiday, Grégoire encounters the beautiful Madeleine. When he returns, his enraptured description of her leads his colleagues to believe that they have become lovers. In truth, he is really destined to be with Denise, a typist who has secretly loved him.

== Cast ==
- René Lefèvre as Grégoire Vachette
- Marie Glory as Denise
- Arlette Marchal as Madeleine
- André Alerme as Courgéan
- André Lefaur as Monsieur de Pryfontaine
- Robert Le Vigan as Girardin
- Jean Sinoël as Bonin
- Paul Marthès as Mignon
- Henry Prestat as Frudet
- André Siméon as Jules

== Bibliography ==
- Bessy, Maurice & Chirat, Raymond. Histoire du cinéma français: 1929-1934. Pygmalion, 1988.
- Crisp, Colin. Genre, Myth and Convention in the French Cinema, 1929-1939. Indiana University Press, 2002.
- Goble, Alan. The Complete Index to Literary Sources in Film. Walter de Gruyter, 1999.
- Rège, Philippe. Encyclopedia of French Film Directors, Volume 1. Scarecrow Press, 2009.
