= Victor Milner =

American cinematographer

Victor Milner, A.S.C.
- Born: December 15, 1893; New York, New York, U.S.
- Died: October 29, 1972 (aged 78); Los Angeles, California, U.S.
- Occupation: Cinematographer
- Board member of: A.S.C. (President 1937 to 1939)
- Spouse: Margaret Schneider (m. November 1, 1916)
- Children: Victor Milner Jr.
- Awards: Academy Award for Best Cinematography (*Cleopatra*, 1934); 10 nominations

Victor Milner, A.S.C. (December 15, 1893 – October 29, 1972) (sometimes Victor Miller) was an American cinematographer. He was nominated for ten cinematography Academy Awards, winning once for 1934 Cleopatra. Milner worked on more than 130 films, including dramas (Broken Lullaby), comedies (Unfaithfully Yours), film noir (Dark City), and Westerns (The Furies). He worked for large production companies like Metro-Goldwyn-Mayer, Universal, and Paramount during his film career.

== Early life ==
Victor Milner was born on 15 December 1893 in Philadelphia, Pennsylvania. When he was 12, his family moved to New York City. As a teenager, he was sometimes put in charge of operating the projector at movies when the movie projector's girlfriend came to visit. Milner later got his projectioner's license and worked as a projectionist. In 1912, he taught Calvin Coolidge how to use a camera.

== Career ==
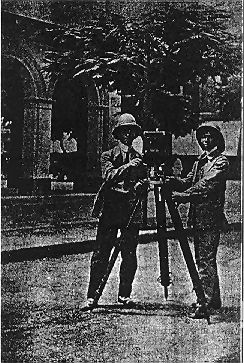
Victor Milner, A.S.C., at Port Said in 1913 with his pioneer camera and African assistant

Milner was hired by Eberhard Schneider, a film equipment manufacturer. He worked as a projectionist and ran supply runs for Schneider. During this time, Milner shot Hiawatha: The Indian Passion Play in 1913 as his first film. In 1914, he managed to photograph a mine strike in Trinidad, Colorado.

Milner was later sent to Galveston, Texas to embark on a destroyer; however, his orders never arrived by mail. Instead, Milner was hired as a private photographer and could travel extensively, even spending nine months in the Belgian Congo taking pictures of the wildlife and people. Milner was later hired by Pathe Freres News Reel, and his first responsibility there was to film marathon races at Union Heights. As part of his job, Milner went on a world tour with the New York Giants and the Chicago White Sox.

Milner was able to go on Woodrow Wilson's first campaign tour, where he became acquainted with Teddy Roosevelt. It was reported that Milner stepped in front of Roosevelt on one occasion to take a photograph. Roosevelt was angered at first but simply requested a copy of the picture.

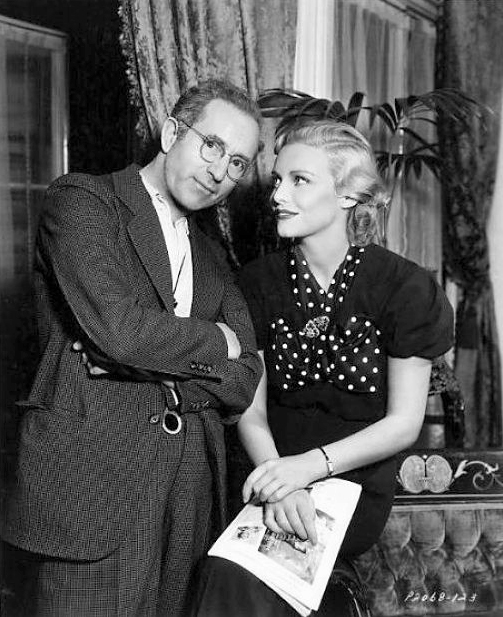
Milner with Madeleine Carroll on the set of The General Died at Dawn (1936).

When Milner returned to the United States, he was married to Margaret Schneider, the daughter of Eberhard Schneider, on November 1, 1916. In 1916 while on his honeymoon, he was hired by the Balboa Amusement Producing Company in Long Beach, California as a cameraman. He worked for Balboa for a year before he went to work for Thomas H. Ince in the William S. Hart unit. Throughout his career, he worked as a second cameraman for 17 films for William S. Hart. He also later worked with the Constance Talmage Company, and at large production companies like Metro-Goldwyn-Mayer, Universal, and he went to Paramount in 1925.

Later Milner became known for the epic look he lent to Cecil B. DeMille film productions. He worked with DeMille for ten years, and helped him direct movies in Technicolor. Milner also worked with other icons in the film industry including Victor Fleming, Raoul Walsh, Preston Sturges, and Ernst Lubitsch.

Milner was captured for three days by Russians with his son, Victor Milner Jr., in 1949. The two were on a trip in Berlin after Milner worked on a film project in Italy, when they were arrested by Soviet officials. They had gotten lost and asked a Russian soldier for directions. They were well-treated, however. Milner retired in 1953 after he completed the film Jeopardy. He died in 1972, having worked on over 130 films throughout his career.

== Awards and accomplishments ==
Milner was nominated for nine Academy Awards during his career, winning one for cinematography in 1934 for the film Cleopatra. Milner received several nominations for in the category of cinematography in the Academy Awards, including The Crusades in 1935, The General Died at Dawn in 1936, and The Buccaneer in the 1938 awards. Milner was also an honorary member of the American Institute of Cinematography. Milner was a founding member of the American Society of Cinematographers and became its president from 1937 to 1939. Milner was featured on the cover of the Who's Who in 1934, and appeared on the cover of American Cinematographer: The Motion Picture Camera Magazine in April 1935.

== Filmography ==
- Hiawatha (1913)
- The Giants-White Sox Tour (1914)
- The Inspirations of Harry Larrabee (1917)
- The Velvet Hand (1918)
- The Cabaret Girl (1918)
- The Sealed Envelope (1919)
- Haunting Shadows (1919)
- Uncharted Channels (1920)
- Out of the Dust (1920)
- One Hour Before Dawn (1920)
- Felix O'Day (1920)
- Half a Chance (1920)
- Her Unwilling Husband (1920)
- Dice of Destiny (1920)
- When We Were 21 (1921)
- Live Wires (1921)
- Play Square (1921)
- What Love Will Do (1921)
- Shadows of Conscience (1921)
- The Cave Girl (1921)
- Her Night of Nights (1922)
- Go Get 'Em, Gates! (1922)
- Unmasked (1922)
- Human Hearts (1922)
- Dead Game (1922)
- Tracked Down (1922)
- The Gypsy Trail (1922)
- The Kentucky Derby (1922)
- The Lavender Bath Lady (1922)
- A Dangerous Game (1922)
- The Love Letter (1923)
- Gossip (1923)
- The Town Scandal (1923)
- What Love Will Do (1923)
- Cause for Divorce (1923)
- Thy Name Is Woman (1924)
- The Red Lily (1924)
- Her Night of Romance (1924)
- On the Stroke of Three (1924)
- The Spaniard (1925)
- East of Suez (1925)
- Learning to Love (1925)
- Brand of Cowardice (1925)
- The Wanderer (1925)
- The Lucky Lady (1926)
- You Never Know Women (1926)
- The Cat's Pajamas (1926)
- Kid Boots (1926)
- The Lady of the Harem (1926)
- Blonde or Brunette (1927)
- Children of Divorce (1927)
- Rolled Stockings (1927)
- The Way of All Flesh (1927)
- The Spotlight (1927)
- The Showdown (1928)
- Three Sinners (1928)
- Half a Bride (1928)
- Loves of an Actress (1928)
- The Woman from Moscow (1928)
- Sins of the Fathers (1928)
- The Wolf of Wall Street (1929)
- The Wild Party (1929)
- The Studio Murder Mystery (1929)
- River of Romance (1929)
- Charming Sinners (1929)
- The Love Parade (1929)
- The Marriage Playground (1929)
- Paramount on Parade (1930)
- True to the Navy (1930)
- The Texan (1930)
- Let's Go Native (1930)
- Monte Carlo (1930)
- Paramount op parade (1930)
- No Limit (1931)
- Ladies' Man (1931)
- Kick In (1931)
- I Take This Woman (1931)
- Daughter of the Dragon (1931)
- Broken Lullaby (1932)
- One Hour with You (1932)
- This is the Night (1932)
- Love Me Tonight (1932)
- Trouble in Paradise (1932)
- Under-Cover Man (1932)
- Luxury Liner (1933)
- The Song of Songs (1933)
- One Sunday Afternoon (1933)
- Design for Living (1933)
- All of Me (1934)
- Wharf Angel (1934)
- Cleopatra (1934)
- The Gilded Lily (1935)
- So Red the Rose (1935)
- The Crusades (1935)
- Desire (1936)
- Give Us This Night (1936)
- Till We Meet Again (1936)
- The General Died at Dawn (1936)
- The Plainsman (1936)
- Bulldog Drummond Escapes (1937)
- High, Wide and Handsome (1937)
- Artists and Models (1937)
- The Buccaneer (1938)
- College Swing (1938)
- Hunted Men (1938)
- Give Me a Sailor (1938)
- Touchdown, Army (1938)
- Say It in French (1938)
- Union Pacific (1939)
- Our Leading Citizen (1939)
- What a Life (1939)
- The Great Victor Herbert (1939)
- Seventeen (1940)
- Those Were the Days! (1940)
- Northwest Mounted Police (1940)
- Christmas in July (1940)
- The Monster and the Girl (1941)
- The Lady Eve (1941)
- The Man Who Lost Himself (1941)
- My Life with Caroline (1941)
- Reap the Wild Wind (1942)
- The Palm Beach Story (1942)
- Hostages (1943)
- The Story of Dr. Wassell (1944)
- The Great Moment (1944)
- The Princess and the Pirate (1944)
- Wonder Man (1945)
- The Strange Love of Martha Ivers (1946)
- It's a Wonderful Life (1946) (uncredited)
- The Other Love (1947)
- You Were Meant For Me (1948)
- Unfaithfully Yours (1948)
- The Furies (1950)
- September Affair (1950) (European scenes)
- Dark City (1950)
- My Favorite Spy (1951)
- Carrie (1952)
- Jeopardy (1953)
