= The Cat's Pajamas =

1926 film

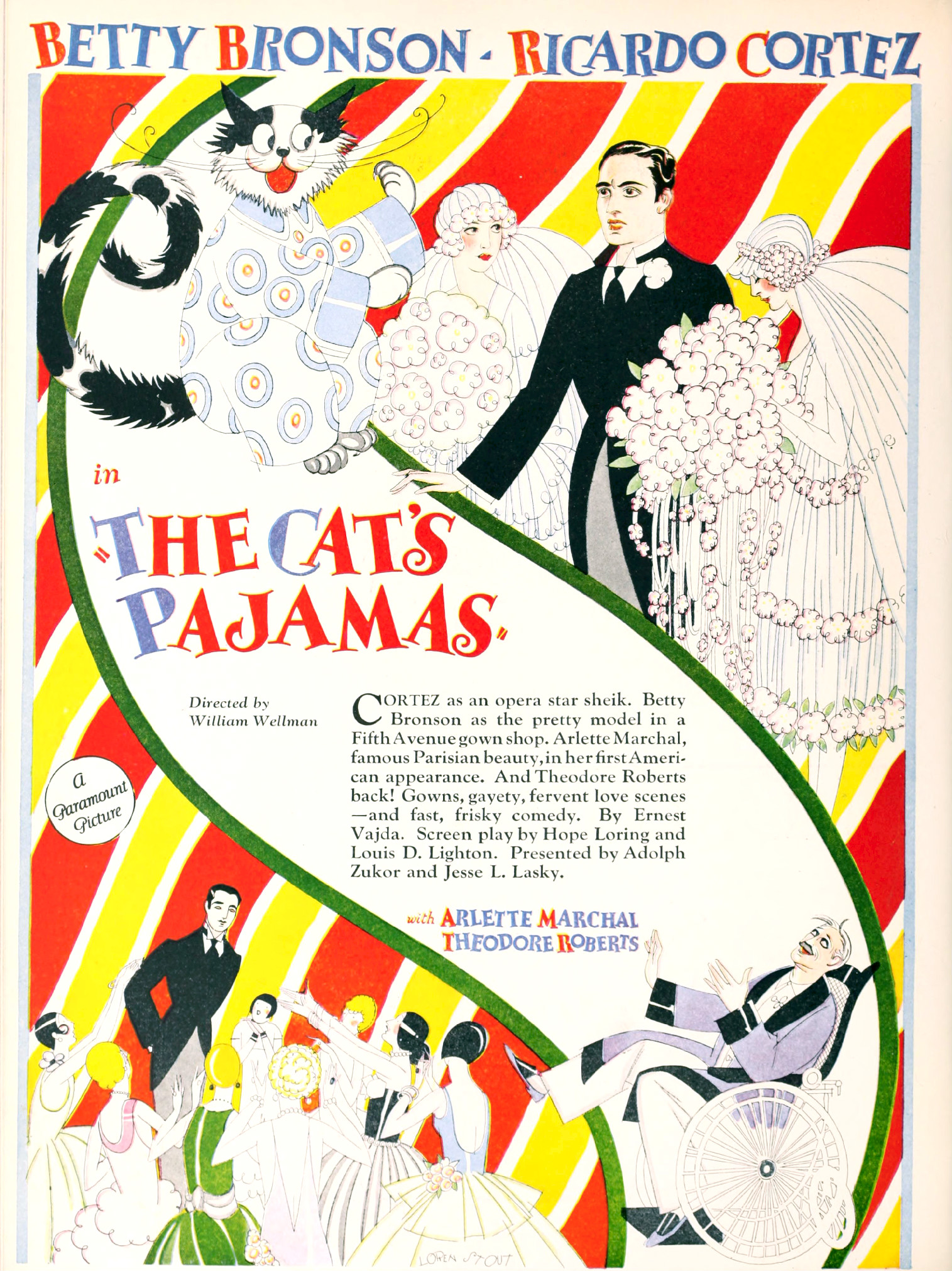
- Advertisement
- Directed by: William A. Wellman
- Screenplay by: Louis D. Lighton; Hope Loring
- Story by: Ernest Vajda
- Produced by: Jesse L. Lasky; Adolph Zukor
- Starring: Betty Bronson; Ricardo Cortez; Arlette Marchal
- Cinematography: Victor Milner
- Production company: Famous Players–Lasky Corporation
- Distributed by: Paramount Pictures
- Release date: August 29, 1926
- Running time: 60 minutes
- Country: United States
- Language: Silent (English intertitles)

The Cat's Pajamas is a 1926 American silent comedy film directed by William A. Wellman and written by Louis D. Lighton, Hope Loring, and Ernest Vajda. The film stars Betty Bronson, Ricardo Cortez, Arlette Marchal, Theodore Roberts, Gordon Griffith, and Tom Ricketts. The film was released on August 29, 1926, by Paramount Pictures.

== Cast ==
- Betty Bronson as Sally Winton
- Ricardo Cortez as Don Cesare Gracco
- Arlette Marchal as Riza Dorina
- Theodore Roberts as Sally's Father
- Gordon Griffith as Jack
- Tom Ricketts as Mr. Briggs

== Preservation status ==
With no prints of The Cat's Pajamas located in any film archives, it is a lost film.
