= Philippe Parès =

French composer (1901–1979)

Philippe Parès (1 January 1901 – 2 February 1979) was a 20th-century French composer of film scores, d'operettas and light music.

== Biography ==
The son of Gabriel Parès, music conductor of the Republican Guard, Philippe Parès met Georges Van Parys at the beginning of the 20s. Georges Van Parys, one year younger, commenced from 1925 to compose little pieces (one-act operettas or musical sketches) and songs. In 1927, they collaborated for the first time on La Petite dame du train bleu, which was created in Lyon. The same year, Lulu was presented in Paris, at the Théâtre Daunou. They worked together until 1931. In particular, they wrote the music for the film The Million by René Clair, in collaboration with Armand Bernard.

Philippe Parès then made a career as a producer of records and music publisher (ambience and film music, education, works for children ...). He produced, particularly around 1928-1929, several important scores of the late silent film era: La Femme et le Pantin by Jacques de Baroncelli and The Passion of Joan of Arc by Carl Dreyer (music by Victor Alix and Léo Pouget), among others.

== Operettas and musical comedies ==
With Georges van Parys :

- 1927: Lulu, three-act operetta, libretto and lyrics by Serge Veber.
- 1927: La Petite dame du train bleu ou Quand y en a pour deux, three-act musical comedy, libretto by Georges Lignereux and Léopold Marchès.
- 1928: L' Eau à la bouche, three-act operetta, libretto by Serge Veber.
- 1929: Louis XIV, operetta in 3 acts and 5 tableaux, libretto by Serge Veber.
- 1930: Le Cœur y est, musical comedy in 3 acts and 4 tableaux, libretto by Raoul Praxy, lyrics by Roger Bernstein.
- 1931: Couss-Couss, extravaganza operetta in 3 acts and 5 tableaux, libretto by Jean Guitton.

Alone:

- 1947: La bride sur le cou, musical comedy, libretto by André Huguet, Henri Lemarchand and Max Eddy.

== Filmography ==
- 1929: Paris-girls by Henry Roussell
- 1929: The Road Is Fine by Robert Florey
- 1931: The Lovers of Midnight by Augusto Genina, Marc Allégret
- 1931: Black and White by Robert Florey, Marc Allégret
- 1931: Le Million by René Clair
- 1931: I'll Be Alone After Midnight by Jacques de Baroncelli
- 1931: Un soir de rafle by Carmine Gallone
- 1932: The Marriage of Mademoiselle Beulemans by Jean Choux
- 1932: Une petite femme dans le train by Karl Anton
- 1934: Toboggan by Henri Decoin
- 1938: Un fichu métier by Pierre-Jean Ducis
- 1941: The Suitors Club by Maurice Gleize
- 1947: Une jeune fille savait by Maurice Lehmann
- 1959: Interpol Against X by Maurice Boutel

=== External links ===
- Phlippe Parès on data.bnf.fr
- Philippe Parès at IMDb
- Georges van Parys et Philippe Parès sur le site de la revue Opérette
