= Uraji Yamakawa =

Japanese actress (1885–1974)

- 山川 浦 路
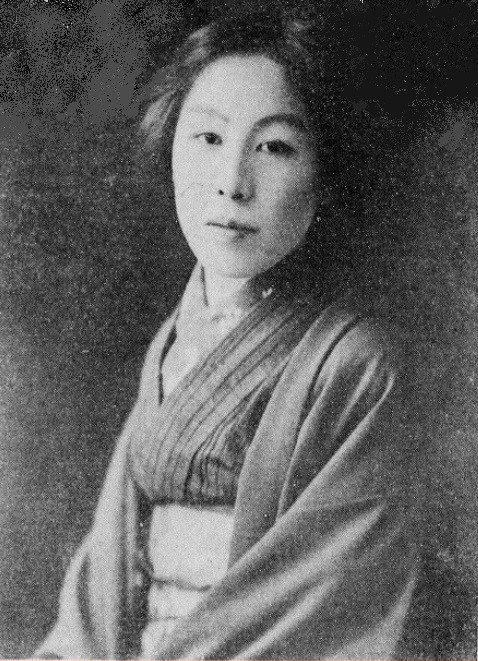
- Yamakawa in 1919
- Born: Uraji Yamakawa / 山川 浦 路 15 November 1885; Japan
- Died: 30 November 1947 (aged 62)
- Other name: Ura Mita
- Occupation: Actress
- Spouse: Sōjin Kamiyama
- Children: 1

Uraji Yamakawa (山川 浦路, Yamakawa Uraji; 15 November 1885 – 30 November 1947) was a Japanese actress, also credited as Ura Mita.

== Career ==
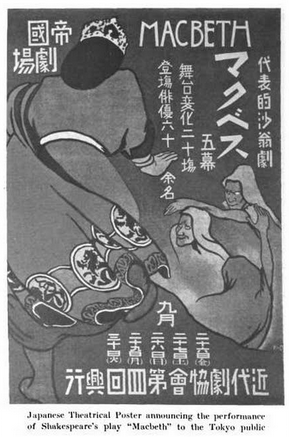
A poster from a 1916 production of Macbeth in Tokyo, featuring Uraji Yamakawa as Lady Macbeth

In 1912, she and her actor husband were co-founders of the Modern Theatre Society (Kindaigeki Kyokai) in Tokyo, formed to bring new Western works to Japanese audiences. In 1914, Yamakawa was considered one of "the foremost interpreters of roles in Western translations" among Japanese actresses. Among her notable roles were Henrik Ibsen's Hedda Gabler, Gretchen in Goethe's Faust, and Lady Macbeth, in which role she gave "a most remarkably untraditional sleep-walking scene". The Modern Theatre Society ended in 1919, when the founders moved to the United States.

She had small roles in two films during her time in America: The Devil Dancer (1927, now lost; a silent film directed by Fred Niblo) and Wu Li Chang (1930, a Spanish-language production).

== Personal life ==
Uraji Yamakawa was married to fellow Japanese actor Sōjin Kamiyama; they lived in California while Sōjin was appearing in American films. After they separated, Yamakawa took bit parts, sold makeup, and cared for her adult son, Edward, who had tuberculosis. During this period, she was friends with novelist Toshiko Tamura. However, during World War II she was relocated along with other Japanese-Americans, while her son was not sent together because of his illness (his subsequent fate is unknown). Yamakawa died in 1947, aged 62 years.
