= The Calendar (play) =

1929 play

- Original language: English
- Written by: Edgar Wallace
- Genre: Crime
- Setting: Ascot, England

Premiere
- Date: 5 August 1929
- Place: Palace Theatre

The Calendar is a 1929 play by the British writer Edgar Wallace. It is a crime thriller set in the world of horse racing world, the sport being among Wallace's interests. The protagonist is a financially struggling racehorse owner with a shady reputation.

It premiered at the Palace Theatre in Manchester before transferring to Wyndham's Theatre in the West End. It was revived for a 42 performance run at the Lyceum Theatre the following year. That year Wallace also adapted it into a novel.

== Film adaptations ==
The tale was adapted for a 1931 film of the same title starring Edna Best and Herbert Marshall. A remake under the same name was released in 1948 with Greta Gynt and John McCallum in the lead roles. Both versions were productions of Gainsborough Pictures.

== Bibliography ==
- Kabatchnik, Amnon. Blood on the Stage, 1975-2000: Milestone Plays of Crime, Mystery, and Detection : an Annotated Repertoire. Rowman & Littlefield, 2012.
- Wearing, J. P. The London Stage 1930–1939: A Calendar of Productions, Performers, and Personnel. Rowman & Littlefield, 2014.
