= The Calendar (novel) =

1930 novel

- First Edition
- Author: Edgar Wallace
- Genre: Thriller
- Publisher: William Collins, Sons
- Publication date: 1930
- Publication place: London, England

The Calendar is a 1930 British thriller novel by Edgar Wallace. A racehorse owner agrees to throw a race and has to deal with the consequences of his decision. It is a novelisation of the 1929 play of the same title by Wallace.

== Publication ==
It was first published by William Collins, Sons, London, in 1930.

== Adaptations ==
The story was made into two films. A 1931 version starring Herbert Marshall and a 1948 version starring John McCallum

There was also a stage version by Wallace, published by Samuel French Ltd. in 1932; the original production being directed by the author.
