= Michael and Mary (play) =

Play by A.A. Milne

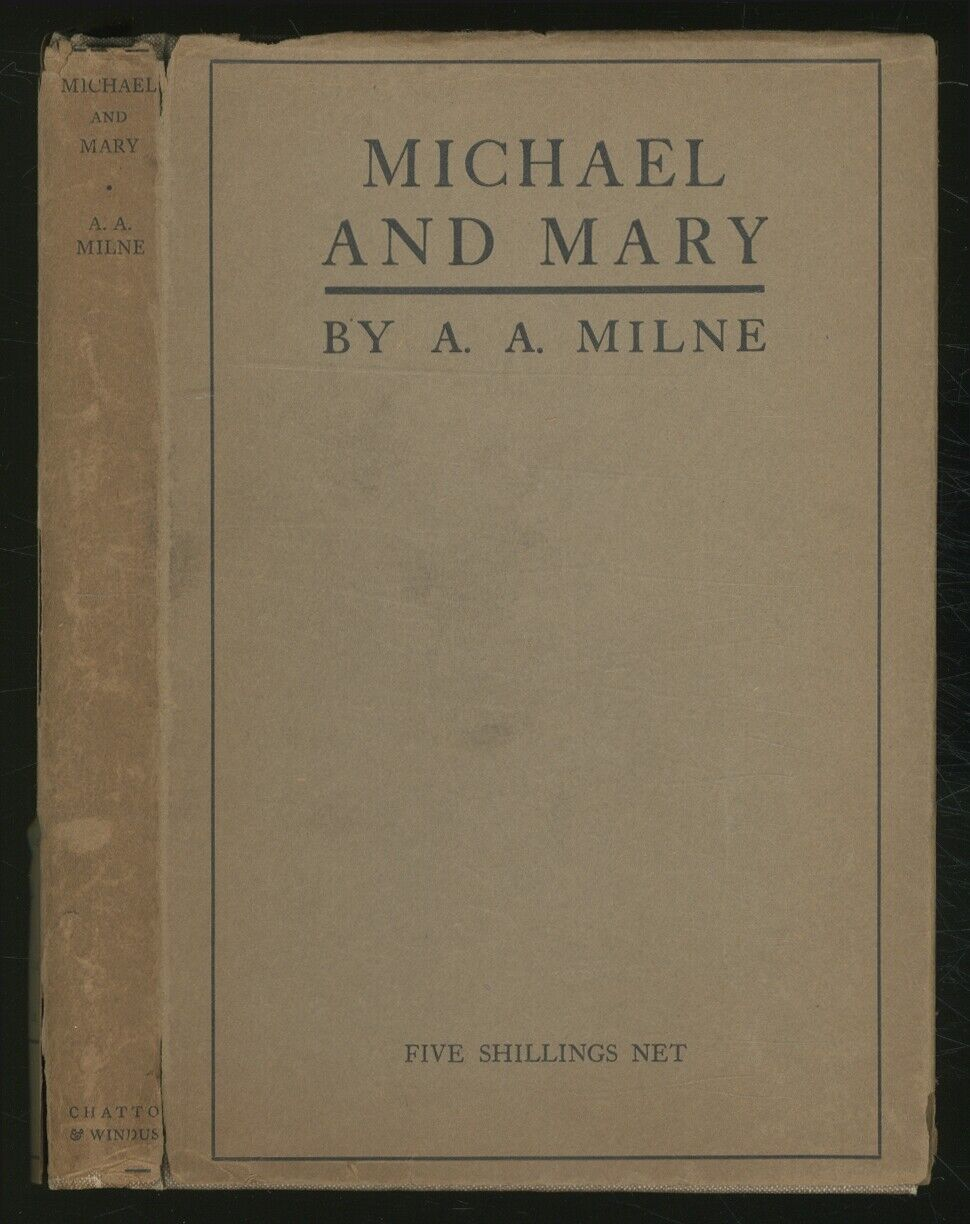
- Original language: English
- Written by: A.A. Milne
- Genre: Drama

Premiere
- Date: 13 December 1929
- Place: Charles Hopkins Theatre, New York

Michael and Mary is a play by the British author A.A. Milne. It was staged at the Charles Hopkins Theatre in New York City, running for 246 performances between December 1929 and July 1930. It had by then transferred to the St James's Theatre in London's West End where it ran for 159 performances between 1 February and 21 June 1930. The original West End cast included Herbert Marshall, Edna Best, Elizabeth Allan, Frank Lawton, D.A. Clarke-Smith, Reginald Bach, Oliver Wakefield, J. Fisher White, Torin Thatcher, Olwen Brookes and Margaret Scudamore.

== Film adaptation ==
In 1931 it was adapted into a British film of the same title directed by Victor Saville and starring Marshall and Best, with many of the other West End performers reprising their role. Produced by Gainsborough Pictures and a commercial success at the British box office, it was released in America the following year by Universal Pictures.

== Bibliography ==
- Goble, Alan. The Complete Index to Literary Sources in Film. Walter de Gruyter, 1999.
- Wearing, J.P. The London Stage 1930-1939: A Calendar of Productions, Performers, and Personnel. Rowman & Littlefield, 2014.
