= Forgotten Faces (1936 film) =

1936 film by Ewald André Dupont

- Directed by: E.A. Dupont
- Written by: Richard Washburn Child; Brian Marlow; Marguerite Roberts; Robert Yost
- Produced by: A.M. Botsford; William T. Lackey; William LeBaron
- Starring: Herbert Marshall; Gertrude Michael; James Burke; Robert Cummings
- Cinematography: Theodor Sparkuhl
- Edited by: Eda Warren
- Music by: Gerard Carbonara; Friedrich Hollaender; John Leipold
- Production company: Paramount Pictures
- Distributed by: Paramount Pictures
- Release date: May 15, 1936
- Running time: 71 minutes
- Country: United States
- Language: English

Forgotten Faces is a 1936 American drama film directed by Ewald André Dupont and starring Herbert Marshall, Gertrude Michael and James Burke. Marshall and Michael had also starred in Till We Meet Again earlier in 1936.

The film was based on a short story by Richard Washburn Child, which had previously been made as a 1928 silent film by Paramount.

== Cast ==
- Herbert Marshall as Harry Ashton
- Gertrude Michael as Cleo Ashton
- James Burke as Sgt. Johnny Donovan
- Robert Cummings as Clinton Faraday
- Betty Jane Rhodes as Sally McBride
- Robert Gleckler as Mike Davidson
- Arthur Hohl as Hi-Jack Eddie
- Alonzo Price as Warden Davis
- Pierre Watkin as Mr. McBride
- Alan Edwards as Steve Deland
- Dora Clement as Mrs. McBride
- Ann Evers as Maid
- Mary Gordon as Mrs. O'Leary
- Andrea Leeds as Salesgirl
- Bess Flowers as Nurse
- Carolyn Ganzer as Baby
- Irving Bacon as Pretty
- Chick Chandler as Chick
- Robert Emmett Keane as Fields
- Jack Norton as Drunk
- Ruth Warren as Nurse
- Paul Newlan as Guard

== Production ==
Dupont made the film as part of a three-picture contract with Paramount Pictures.

Cummings was cast in April 1936.

== Bibliography ==
- St. Pierre, Paul Matthew. E.A. Dupont and His Contribution to British Film. Fairleigh Dickinson University Press, 2010 .
