= The Solitaire Man =

1933 film by Jack Conway

- Herbert Marshall and Elizabeth Allan
- Directed by: Jack Conway
- Based on: The Solitaire Man; 1927 play by Bella and Samuel Spewack
- Produced by: Bernard H. Hyman
- Starring: Herbert Marshall; Mary Boland; Lionel Atwill; May Robson; Elizabeth Allan
- Cinematography: Roy Overbaugh
- Edited by: Frank Sullivan
- Distributed by: Metro-Goldwyn-Mayer
- Release date: September 22, 1933
- Running time: 67 minutes
- Country: United States
- Language: English

The Solitaire Man is a 1933 American pre-Code drama film directed by Jack Conway and starring Herbert Marshall and Mary Boland.

== Plot ==
After a job in Monte Carlo, an English jewel theft ring returns to Paris. Suave cat burglar Oliver Lane, fashioned the "Solitaire Man" in the newspapers after seven years of eluding Scotland Yard, proposes marriage to his lovely accomplice Helen and informs her he has bought a country house in Devonshire to which they can all retire. However, unstable Robert Bascom, drug-addicted after his experiences in the Great War, also loves Helen and wants to continue on his own. He presents Oliver with the "Brewster necklace" that he burgled from the British Embassy while he dined there with his former colonel. Realizing Bascom would be the only suspect and his arrest would lead back to all of them, Oliver returns the Brewster necklace to the safe just as an inspector from Scotland Yard tracking the Solitaire Man arrives at the embassy. Before Oliver can make his escape, a second man sneaks in and steals the necklace but is interrupted by the inspector, who recognizes the thief but is shot and killed by him. Oliver struggles in the dark with the killer during his getaway and grabs the necklace and part of the killer's watch chain.

With Bascom, Helen and the elderly Mrs. Vail, the fourth member of the ring who poses as an impoverished British aristocrat in order to sell the stolen jewels to gullible American tourists, Oliver hastily decides to fly to England. They are joined on the airplane by a garrulous, wealthy American socialite, Mrs. Hopkins, and a last moment arrival in the form of an unknown Englishman. As the airplane is taking off, Mrs. Hopkins demands that the pilot stop to pick up her late-arriving husband Elmer. Although Oliver's group is willing to oblige her, the other man insists that they continue, and the pilots refuse because of a heavy fog. The stranger identifies himself as Inspector Wallace of Scotland Yard and attempts to arrest Oliver for being the Solitaire Man. When he demands at gunpoint to search Oliver's luggage for the Brewster necklace, the group disarms Wallace, revealing their complicity, and Oliver tells Bascom to lock Wallace in his own handcuffs. The passengers become aware that another plane is following them, which Wallace claims is a French Army plane he arranged as an escort in case they tried to land in France. Convinced that Wallace is what he claims to be, Oliver offers to give himself up and turn over the necklace in exchange for the freedom of the others. When Wallace is distracted by the offer, Oliver turns off the plane's cabin lights to throw off the pursuing French plane in the fog.

Noticing that Wallace is not really handcuffed, Oliver asks him about how he knew Oliver would be on the flight and accuses Bascom of tipping off the police. Bascom admits that he intended to betray Oliver in his anger over Helen but denies carrying out the scheme. Oliver, however, realizes that Bascom and Wallace, who now claims to be a fast-thinking burglar himself, were in league to turn in Oliver to collect a £10,000 reward for the Solitaire Man. He searches Wallace and finds the letter Bascom wrote telling the police about Oliver's travel plans. Overwhelmed by guilt, Bascom jumps from the plane to his death. From the Scotland yard-issue pistol Wallace was carrying, Oliver deduces that not only is Wallace a crook, but he covers up his own crimes by being a police informant. Helen notices that Wallace's pocket watch has a broken chain, and Oliver accuses Wallace of being the murderer of the dead inspector. Oliver again turns out the cabin lights and appears to have also jumped from the plane with the necklace, but when the lights are turned back on, he emerges from the cockpit. He agrees to give Wallace the Brewster necklace and confess falsely to the murder, returning the gun unloaded as part of the charade, if Wallace tells Scotland Yard that the others had no part in any of the crimes.

The plane lands in Croydon and is boarded unexpectedly by police constables to detain the passengers for Scotland Yard. The "French Army escort" lands immediately behind them and turns out to be only a plane hired by Mrs. Hopkins' husband Elmer to bring him to England after he missed the flight. When Wallace identifies himself as "Inspector Wallace" to the officers and tries to leave to "file his report," Oliver insists that it is he who is the inspector and Wallace the Solitaire Man to prevent it. The passengers are interrogated by Inspector Harris, who knows Wallace (acidly reminding the informant that he is not a detective) and is the former partner of the murdered inspector. Oliver tricks Wallace into exposing himself as the jewel thief and the murderer. Wallace tries to escape out a window using the gun but is shot by Harris, who does not realize the gun is empty. Oliver then reveals that when he went to the cockpit, he used the plane's radio to summon Scotland Yard to detain the arrivals. Harris accepts Mrs. Hopkins' corroboration of Oliver's explanation that he is only a legitimate jewelry dealer who offered to appraise the necklace when Wallace had tried to sell it to her on the plane. Oliver and Helen head off to start new lives as a quiet, happily married Devonshire couple.

== Reception ==
Mordaunt Hall wrote favorably of the film on the day of its release, describing Herbert Marshall's portrayal of protagonist Oliver Lane as "fine fettle", and especially praising Ralph Forbes as Robert Bascom.

Some reviewers have regarded the film as a follow-up to the popular film Trouble in Paradise, also starring Herbert Marshall as a thief, albeit on a lower budget.

== Cast ==
- Herbert Marshall as Oliver Lane
- Mary Boland as Mrs. Hopkins
- Lionel Atwill as Inspector Wallace
- May Robson as Mrs. Vail
- Elizabeth Allan as Helen Heming
- Ralph Forbes as Robert Bascom
- Lucille Gleason as Mrs. Peabody
- Robert McWade as Arthur Peabody

Unbilled

- Harry Holman as Mrs. Hopkins' husband, Elmer
- Andre Cheron as French creditor
- Leyland Hodgson as Whittaker, the co-pilot
- Jean De Briac as Henri, the headwaiter
- Emile Chautard as French hotel clerk
- Frank Puglia as waiter
- Jameson Thomas as Inspector Kenyon
- Murray Kinnell as Inspector Harris
- Lawrence Grant as Sir Charles Brewster, the British Ambassador
