= These Charming People (play) =

Play by Michael Arlen

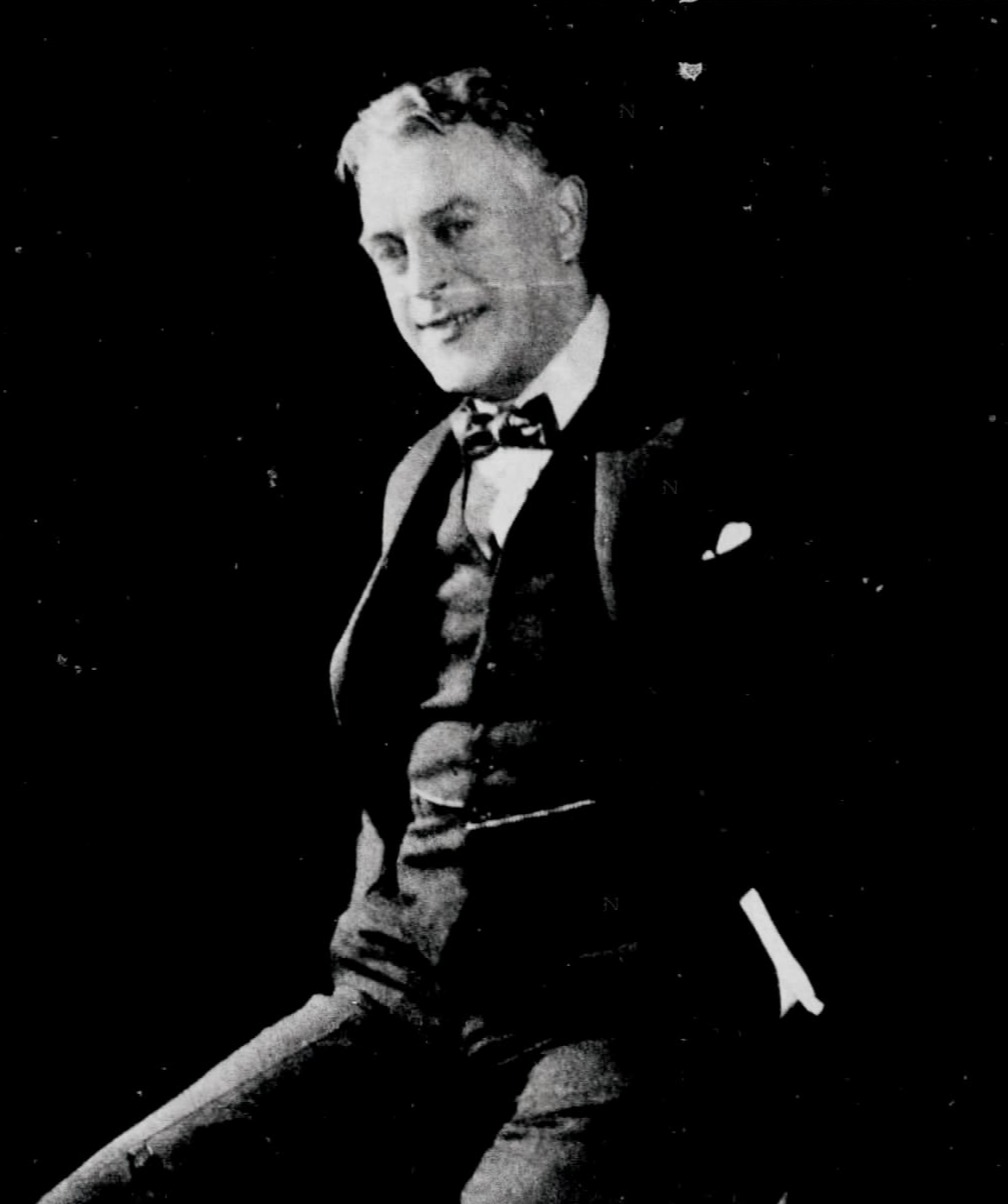
- Cyril Maude in 1925
- Original language: English
- Written by: Michael Arlen
- Based on: Dear Father by Michael Arlen
- Subject: Adultery imperils domicile
- Genre: Comedy
- Setting: A Chester Square townhouse, and hotel sitting room at Guilford

Premiere
- Date: October 6, 1925
- Place: Gaiety Theatre
- Directed by: Winchell Smith

These Charming People is a 1925 play adapted by Michael Arlen from his much earlier work Dear Father. It is a three-act comedy leaning to farce, with two settings, and eight speaking characters. The action of the play occurs within twenty-four hours time. The story concerns an aristocratic spendthrift whose daughter's looming adultery threatens to have his wealthy son-in-law foreclose on the family home. The title was taken from a book of short stories by Arlen published in 1923. There is no connection between those stories and the play.

The original Dear Father had a one-night special production in the UK on November 30, 1924. Arlen then expanded and renamed the play, which A. H. Woods and Charles Dillingham produced in the US. Winchell Smith staged the US version, with scenic design by James Reynolds and sets built by P. Dodd Ackerman. The play starred Cyril Maude, with Herbert Marshall, Alma Tell, and Edna Best making her American debut. It had a brief tryout in Hartford, Connecticut during September 1925, before premiering on Broadway in early October, where it ran until late December 1925.

The play was later adapted for a 1932 British film of the same name.

== Characters ==
Characters are listed in order of appearance within their scope.

Lead

- Sir George Crawford, Bart is a widower and MP, a wastrel who has mortgaged his house to his son-in-law.

Supporting

- James Berridge is a newspaper magnate married to Sir George's elder daughter Julia, a dull unattractive fellow.
- Pamela Crawford is Sir George's boyish younger daughter, a flapper and a bright young thing.
- Julia Berridge is James' wife, who out of boredom is eloping with one of her husband's subordinates.
- Geoffrey Allen is a young handsome editor for one of James Berridge's newspapers, and now Julia's paramour.

Featured

- Minx is the old butler for Sir George, who has a family secret and a decided opinion on misalliances.
- Capt. Miles Winter is a handsome and thick-headed young officer, whom Pamela allows to court her.
- An Old Waiter serves in the sitting room at the Bat and Ball Hotel.

== Synopsis ==
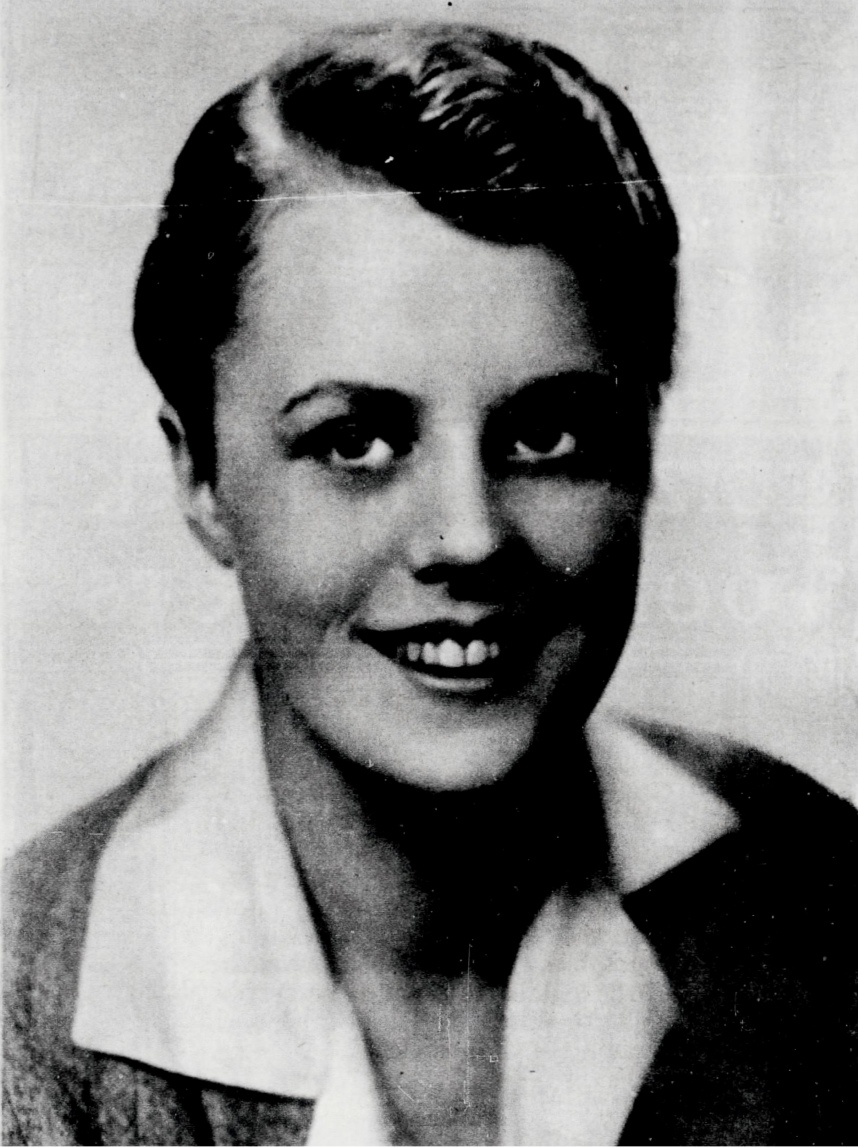
Edna Best 1925

This synopsis was compiled from contemporaneous newspaper reviews.

Scenes: Act I (Sir George's House in Chester Square.) Act II (The same. The next morning.) Act III (Sitting room of Bat and Ball Hotel at Guilford. The same day.)

Sir George, long a sponge on friends and acquaintances, has become an MP by the influence of his son-in-law James Berridge, and obtained a large loan from him, secured by his London townhouse. When Berridge comes to tell Sir George of his daughter Julia's rumored adultery, Sir George is alarmed. Berridge is in line for a peerage, and cannot afford any hint of scandal. He threatens to evict Sir George, for he knows how the two daughters dote on their parasite of a father and will listen to him. Desperate to avoid losing his home and even worse his source of easy loans, Sir George starts a campaign to stop Julia's infidelity. But Julia finds her husband insufferably dull, while she dreads the thought of the attention a peerage will focus on their daily life. She is attracted to Geoffrey Allen, who has an engaging mind. Younger sister Pamela, however, prefers her man to be seen and not heard, which Miles Winter fulfills in his dunderheaded way to Sir George's annoyance. As Julia prepares to take the fatal step, she discovers an unpleasant fact: Geoffrey is the son of a cleaning woman and her father's butler Minx. Even more appalling, Minx is firmly against the illicit romance, not wishing his son to be allied with such disreputable nobs. Julia decides to meet with her husband and make a deal; if he will turn down the peerage, she will return to him. He agrees, and the play ends with Sir George hitting up both Berridge and Winter for loans.

== Original production ==
=== Background ===
Michael Arlen's novel The Green Hat was published in both the UK and the US during 1924. It was a sensation and a best seller; he started to adapt it for the stage in October 1924. Arlen already had another work ready for the theater, a three-act play called Dear Father, which he had written ten years before. A special one-performance production was put together by the Play Actors Society; it was presented on November 30, 1924, at the New Scala Theatre. Dear Father had only five characters: The father, the daughter, the son-in-law, the other man, and the butler, played respectively by Herbert Marshall, Isabel Jeans, H. St. Barbe West, G. H. Mulcaster, and H. R. Hignett.

The UK rights to Dear Father were acquired soon after by Ronald Squire and A. W. Baskcomb, who asked Michael Arlen to do some rewriting. No more is heard of Dear Father, but in April 1925, American producers A. H. Woods and Charles Dillingham announced their purchase of a new Michael Arlen play called These Charming People, said to be based on his 1923 book of the same name. These Charming People was a collection of short stories, barely related other than by the shared social milieu in which the characters existed. (Note: The title of one story from the collection, "When the Nightingale Sang in Berkeley Square" later inspired a popular song in 1939.) Dramatization of it would have been difficult; instead, he simply took the title from that best selling book and applied it to his revised version of Dear Father, justifying it with a statement in the program by saying they both deal with the same sort of people.

=== Cast ===
Cast from the Hartford tryout through the Broadway run.
Role	Actor	Dates	Notes and sources
Sir George Crawford	Cyril Maude	Sep 28, 1925 - Dec 26, 1925	
James Berridge	Alfred Drayton	Sep 28, 1925 - Dec 26, 1925	
Pamela Crawford	Edna Best	Sep 28, 1925 - Dec 26, 1925	Best was married to Herbert Marshall at the time of this production.
Julia Berridge	Alma Tell	Sep 28, 1925 - Dec 26, 1925	
Geoffrey Allen	Herbert Marshall	Sep 28, 1925 - Dec 26, 1925	Marshall acted using a prosthetic limb, having lost a leg in the Great War.
Minx	Robert Vivian	Sep 28, 1925 - Dec 26, 1925	
Capt. Miles Winter	Geoffrey Millar	Sep 28, 1925 - Dec 26, 1925	
An Old Waiter	Frank Ranney	Sep 28, 1925 - Dec 26, 1925	

=== Tryout ===
These Charming People had a three-day tryout at Parsons' Theatre in Hartford, Connecticut starting September 28, 1925. The local reviewer suggested the excellence of Cyril Maude and the cast was largely responsible for the audience's enjoyment, "for the play is one that needs shrewd and sure playing". They said it starts off as a comedy of manners and descends into farce with a twist of reverse classism at the end.

=== Broadway premiere and reception ===
The production had its Broadway premiere at the Gaiety Theatre on Tuesday, October 6, 1925. Arthur Pollock said the playwright and Cyril Maude collaborated in turning the comedy into farce, and was most taken with the vitality of Edna Best. The reviewer for The Brooklyn Daily Times clued readers to the disconnect between the book called These Charming People and the play with that title, which they called "an engaging and deliciously impossible comedy of manners in Mayfair". They also were taken with the performance of Edna Best, calling her a "fine, lucid talent".

Burns Mantle said the play belonged to Cyril Maude, his character dominating the story. Mantle also liked the "daintily aggressive" younger sister played by Edna Best. He noted Winchell Smith staged the play and James Reynolds designed the sets. Another critic found the older daughter, played by Alma Tell, much less credible: "One wondered why two such men found her so irresistible, and, as a matter of fact, they both seemed to be somewhat lukewarm about it themselves". The New York Times reviewer found nothing of lasting worth in the play itself, but thought the actors performed well, though "occasionally they seemed embarrassed by having little to do".

=== Broadway closing ===
These Charming People finished its Broadway run at the Gaiety Theatre on Saturday, December 26, 1925, after either 97 or 107 performances. (Note: Burns Mantle cites the higher figure in his Best Plays of 1925-26,, while the lower figure is from The Billboard.)

== Adaptations ==
=== Film ===
- These Charming People (1931) A joint American-British film, made by Paramount Pictures at Elstree Studios for a cost of £40,000. The story was adapted by Reginald Denham, while Louis Mercanton directed. Cyril Maude reprised his lead role, with Ann Todd, Godfrey Tearle, Nora Swinburne, and Anthony Ireland in support.

== Bibliography ==
- Burns Mantle (ed). The Best Plays of 1925-26 And The Year Book Of The Drama In America. Dodd, Mead and Company, 1926.
