= Make Way for a Lady =

1936 film by David Burton

- Directed by: David Burton
- Screenplay by: Gertrude Purcell
- Based on: Daddy and I 1935 novel by Elizabeth Jordan
- Produced by: Zion Myer
- Starring: Herbert Marshall; Anne Shirley; Gertrude Michael
- Cinematography: David Abel
- Edited by: George Crone
- Music by: Roy Webb
- Production company: RKO Radio Pictures
- Distributed by: RKO Radio Pictures
- Release date: November 13, 1936
- Running time: 65 minutes
- Country: United States
- Language: English

Make Way for a Lady is a 1936 American romantic comedy drama film directed by David Burton and starring Herbert Marshall, Anne Shirley and Gertrude Michael. June Drew (Anne Shirley) is the teenaged "lady" based on Elizabeth Jordan's novel Daddy and I. Marshall and Michael previously starred together in Till We Meet Again, earlier in 1936.

== Plot ==
June Drew is the daughter of widowed Christopher Drew, who suffers in silence as his daughter tries to "match" him with every eligible woman in sight.

== Cast ==
- Herbert Marshall as Christopher 'Chris' Drew
- Anne Shirley as June Drew
- Gertrude Michael as Miss Eleanor Emerson
- Margot Grahame as Valerie Broughton
- Taylor Holmes as George Terry
- Clara Blandick as Mrs. Dell, Drew's Maid
- Frank Coghlan Jr. as Billy Hopkins
- Maxine Jennings as Miss Marian Moore
- Mary Jo Ellis as Mildred Jackson
- Murray Kinnell as Doctor Barnes
