= Riptide (1934 film) =

1934 American romance film directed by Edmund Goulding

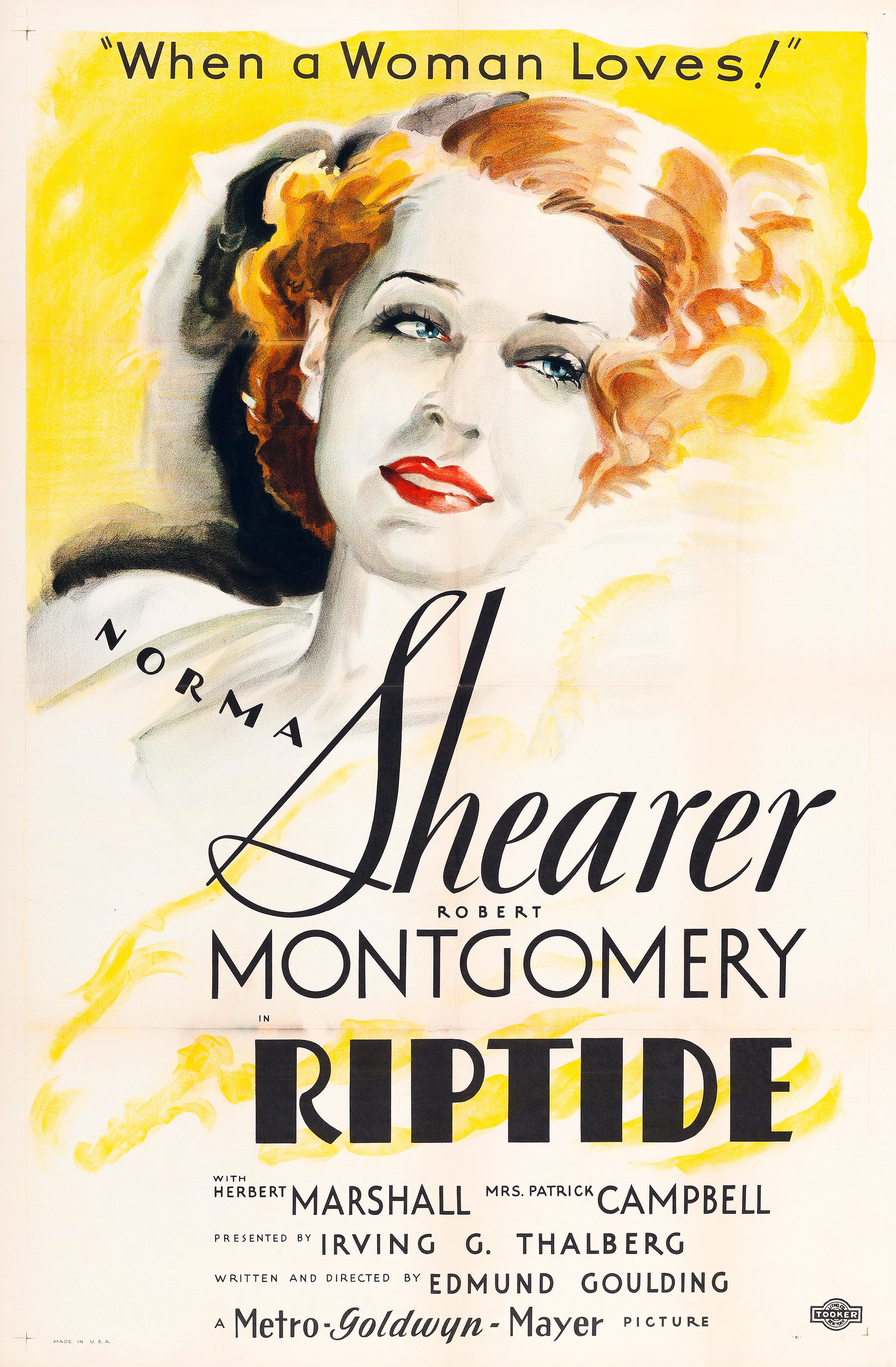
- Theatrical release poster
- Directed by: Edmund Goulding
- Written by: Edmund Goulding; Ben Hecht (uncredited); Charles MacArthur (uncredited)
- Produced by: Irving Thalberg
- Starring: Norma Shearer; Robert Montgomery; Herbert Marshall; Mrs. Patrick Campbell
- Cinematography: Ray June
- Edited by: Margaret Booth
- Music by: Herbert Stothart
- Production company: Metro-Goldwyn-Mayer
- Distributed by: Loew's Inc.
- Release date: March 30, 1934
- Running time: 92 minutes
- Country: United States
- Language: English
- Budget: $769,000
- Box office: $1,741,000

Riptide is a 1934 American pre-Code romantic drama film starring Norma Shearer, Robert Montgomery and Herbert Marshall, written and directed by Edmund Goulding, and released by Metro-Goldwyn-Mayer.

The film was released a few months before the Production Code was enforced. This film had a noteworthy appearance by Mrs. Patrick Campbell, a famous stage actress known for her friendship and correspondence with playwright George Bernard Shaw and her creation of Eliza Doolittle in Shaw's play Pygmalion.

== Plot ==
In a hotel room at the Ritz, Lord Rexford struggles with a bizarre insect man costume provided by his hostess for a ball on Long Island. He goes to pick up another guest, Mary, who is equally unhappy with her outfit, which conceals very little except her face. They agree to skip the party and meet at his place. They are captivated with each other at first sight and soon kiss. The kiss dissolves to their farewells as he prepares to sail to Europe, some time later. Their “beautiful spree”, she says, was “perfect”, something she will cherish all her life. He proposes, she refuses, and they kiss and part. The ship sails, and she prepares to write a message. He steps up behind her, having left everything aboard. He is serious about marriage. She asks if he is sure, after all she has told him about her past. He declares it is all forgiven.

Five years later, Rexford must leave Mary in England while he travels on business to America. His “naughty” Aunt Hetty takes to Mary immediately, declaring that Mary has "vvvvvvvvvv vim", as she did in her youth. She invites Mary to join her at Cannes for “sunshine and laughter.” There Mary runs into an old acquaintance from New York, Tommie, a charming, heavy-drinking playboy. Under the influence of several bottles of champagne, his love for Mary explodes into obsession; ardently pursuing her, he falls from a balcony at her hotel and nearly dies. The mad pursuit, the suggestion of attempted suicide, and the chaste kiss she gives him in his hospital room (caught by a pressman) create an international scandal. A Sunday Supplement wonders if Mary was one of Tommie's many mistresses in New York. Upon his return, Lord Rexford is furious, but conceals it. He refuses to believe Mary's truthful explanation, that Tommie kissed her and she fled, throwing up to her the fact that she became his lover after one kiss.

Rexford remains cool, avoiding Mary, even waiting until she has left the nursery before entering to say goodnight to their young daughter. Seeking to escape the tension and loneliness at home, Mary accepts an invitation from her sister, Sylvia, to a nightspot. Rexford follows her, and, assuming that this is the way she usually spends her time, he tells her he is filing for divorce. Aunt Hetty and her crowd are there, and Tommie approaches Mary.

Cut to Riversleigh Hall late at night, where a fire is being brought under control. Tommie is in Mary's room; several guests see them together. Meanwhile, in St. Moritz, Rexford's lawyer tells him that he thoroughly investigated the incident in Cannes and he has no case. Rexford sends a telegram begging Mary to come to him, signing it “All Love”. Aunt Hetty takes it over the phone, repeating every word. All her guests hear.

Mary leaves for St. Moritz, telling Tommie she must end it with Rexford by telling him the truth. At the hotel, she is about to confess when Rexford gives her a letter of apology that moves her to tears. Their supposed reconciliation makes the papers, although Mary's guilt keeps her from a complete reunion.. Back in London, she is tormented by her efforts to protect Rexford, and Rexford is tormented by his jealousy. Tommie tells Rexford that he wants to marry Mary, and the truth comes out. This time she asks for the divorce, admitting that she still loves him. Mary plans to return to New York, refusing any settlement and sadly renouncing custody of her daughter. After dictating the final agreement, she refuses to say goodbye to her daughter, as a last meeting would be unbearable for her. Mary and Rexford struggle to say goodbye; then he declares they can't be parted. Their daughter bursts into the room and, to a phrase from the Bridal Chorus, Mary sweeps her up in her arms, landing on the sofa with the child in her lap. Rexford kisses Mary while their daughter watches.

== Cast ==
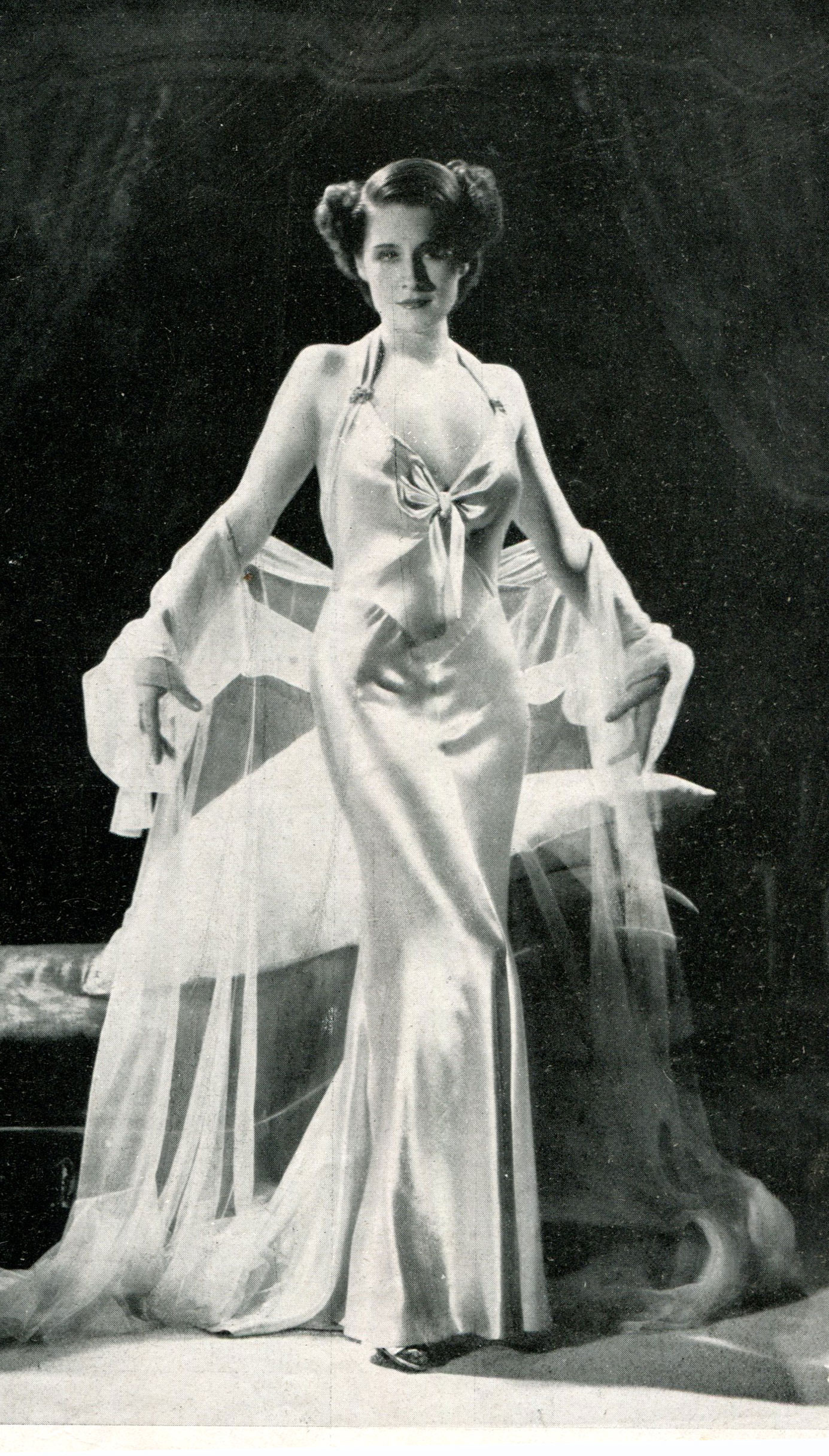
Norma Shearer in Riptide

- Norma Shearer - Lady Mary Rexford
- Robert Montgomery - Tommie Trent
- Herbert Marshall - Lord Philip Rexford
- Mrs. Patrick Campbell - Aunt Hetty Riversleigh
- Richard "Skeets" Gallagher - Erskine (*as Skeets Gallagher)
- Ralph Forbes - David Fenwick
- Lilyan Tashman - Sylvia Wilson
- Arthur L. Jarrett - Percy
- Earl Oxford - Freddie Gray
- Helen Jerome Eddy - Celeste
- George K. Arthur - Bertie Davis
- Halliwell Hobbes - Bollard
- Walter Brennan - Chauffeur (uncredited)

== Box office ==
The film grossed a total (domestic and foreign) of $1,741,000: $1,023,000 from the US and Canada and $718,000 elsewhere. It made a profit of $333,000.

== See also ==
- National Recovery Administration (NRA), the logo displayed at start of film
