= The Calendar (1931 film) =

1931 British film by T. Hayes Hunter

- Directed by: T. Hayes Hunter
- Written by: Angus MacPhail; Robert Stevenson
- Based on: The Calendar by Edgar Wallace
- Produced by: Michael Balcon
- Starring: Herbert Marshall; Edna Best; Anne Grey
- Cinematography: Alex Bryce; Bernard Knowles
- Edited by: Bryan Edgar Wallace
- Music by: Harold V. King
- Production company: Gainsborough Pictures
- Distributed by: Woolf & Freedman Film Service
- Release date: 31 October 1931
- Running time: 80 minutes
- Country: United Kingdom
- Language: English

The Calendar is a 1931 British drama film directed by T. Hayes Hunter and starring Herbert Marshall, Edna Best and Anne Grey. Racehorse owner Anson is swindled by a woman named Wenda and goes up in front of the Jockey Club where he is disqualified on race fixing allegations. He decides to get his own back with the help of Hillcott, an ex-burglar. Jill is the love interest. It was released as Bachelor's Folly in the United States.

The film was made at Beaconsfield Studios. It was based on The Calendar, a 1929 play and subsequent novel by Edgar Wallace. A remake was released in 1948.

== Cast ==
- Herbert Marshall as Gerry Anson
- Edna Best as Jill Panniford
- Anne Grey as Wenda Panniford
- Gordon Harker as Sam Hillcott
- Nigel Bruce as Lord Willie Panniford
- Alfred Drayton as John Dory
- Leslie Perrins as Henry Lascarne
- Allan Aynesworth as Edmund Garth
- Melville Cooper as Mr. Wayne
- John Charlton as Swell
- J.B. Spendlove as Jockey

== See also ==
- List of films about horses
- List of films about horse racing

== Bibliography ==
- Wood, Linda. British Films, 1927–1939. British Film Institute, 1986.
