= The Notorious Sophie Lang =

1934 film by Ralph Murphy

- Directed by: Ralph Murphy
- Produced by: Bayard Veiller
- Starring: Gertrude Michael; Paul Cavanagh; Alison Skipworth
- Cinematography: Alfred Gilks
- Edited by: James Smith
- Distributed by: Paramount Pictures
- Release date: July 20, 1934
- Running time: 64 minutes
- Country: United States
- Language: English

The Notorious Sophie Lang is a 1934 American crime drama film directed by Ralph Murphy and starring Gertrude Michael, Paul Cavanagh and Alison Skipworth. The title character is a beautiful international jewel thief who returns to the United States after five years in Britain, but the American detectives set a trap.

The Notorious Sophie Lang is the first of three Sophie Lang pictures with Gertrude Michael, each with a different director. The others are The Return of Sophie Lang (1936) and Sophie Lang Goes West (1937).

== Cast ==
- Gertrude Michael as Sophie Lang
- Paul Cavanagh as Max Bernard/Sir Nigel Crane
- Arthur Byron as Inspector Stone
- Alison Skipworth as Aunt Nellie
- Leon Errol as Stubbs
- Ben Taggart as Captain Thompson
- Ferdinand Gottschalk as Augustus Telfen
- Dell Henderson as House Detective
- Jack Mulhall as Jewelry Clerk
