= Chester Bailey Fernald =

American writer and playwright

C. B. Fernald
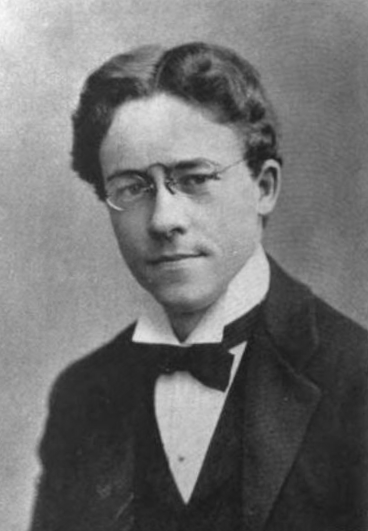
- In The Sketch, September 6, 1899
- Born: Chester Bailey Fernald; March 18, 1869; Boston, Massachusetts, US
- Died: April 10, 1938 (aged 69); Dover, South East England
- Occupations: Writer, playwright

Chester Bailey Fernald (March 18, 1869 – April 10, 1938) also known as C. B. Fernald, was an American writer and playwright.

== History ==
Fernald was born in Boston, Massachusetts. He moved to London, living in Gower Street, W.C. sometime around 1915, to be with his son Van Dyke Fernald, who volunteered for the British army. The son died in the War.

== Career ==
He ventured into the realm of literature and penned several works. His short stories were published in, inter alia and Harper's Magazine.

In August 1918, his play The Cat and the Cherub, about a street in San Francisco Chinatown in 1905, was played at the Forest Theater in Carmel-by-the-Sea, California, a production of the Carmel Arts and Crafts Club.

== Death ==
Fernald died in Dover Harbour, South East England, believed drowned, after being knocked overboard by the boom of his boat, the auxiliary cutter Florence. His son, J. B. Fernald, had thrown out a rope to him, but to no avail. They had just returned from a voyage to France.

== Works ==
Books

- Chinatown Stories
- The Cat and the Cherub and other Stories
- The White Umbrella

Plays

- The Ghetto
- The Love Thief
- The Mask and the Face
- The Princess in the Cage
- The Day Before the Day — "anti-German vitriol"
- The Moonlight Blossom played by Mrs Patrick Campbell
- The Cat and the Cherub
- 98.9
