= The Lady Consents =

1936 film directed by Stephen Roberts

- Directed by: Stephen Roberts
- Screenplay by: P. J. Wolfson; Anthony Veiller
- Story by: P. J. Wolfson
- Produced by: Edward Kaufman
- Starring: Ann Harding; Herbert Marshall; Margaret Lindsay
- Cinematography: J. Roy Hunt
- Music by: Roy Webb
- Production company: RKO Radio Pictures
- Distributed by: RKO Radio Pictures
- Release date: February 7, 1936 (US)
- Running time: 76 minutes
- Country: United States
- Language: English

The Lady Consents is a 1936 American romantic melodrama film directed by Stephen Roberts and starring Ann Harding, Herbert Marshall and Margaret Lindsay. The screenplay was written by P. J. Wolfson and Anthony Veiller, from Wolfson's story "The Indestructible Mrs. Talbot". RKO Radio Pictures released the film on February 7, 1936.

== Synopsis ==
Surgeon Michael Talbot assists sportswoman Geraldine Mannerly after she is injured in a horse-riding incident. She sets out to try and split him off from his loving wife Anne.

== Cast ==
- Ann Harding as Anne Talbot
- Herbert Marshall as Dr. Michael J. Talbot
- Margaret Lindsay as Geraldine "Gerry" Mannerly
- Walter Abel as Stanley Ashton
- Edward Ellis as Jim Talbot
- Hobart Cavanaugh as Mr. Yardley
- Ilka Chase as Susan
- Willie Best as Sam (uncredited)

== Reception ==
Variety described it as "a well made picture" and stated that although the plot "is mechanical at times, the results are a bit above average for this type of story." They credited the quality of the film as being largely due to the direction, and the performances of the cast, specifically noting Ann Harding, Herbert Marshall, Walter Abel, Margaret Lindsay and Edward Ellis.

== Bibliography ==
- Fetrow, Alan G. Sound films, 1927-1939: a United States Filmography. McFarland, 1992.
