= Sophie Lang Goes West =

1937 film by Charles Reisner

- Theatrical release poster
- Directed by: Charles Reisner
- Screenplay by: Frederick Irving Anderson; Doris Anderson; Brian Marlow; Robert Wyler
- Starring: Gertrude Michael; Lee Bowman; Sandra Storme; Buster Crabbe; Barlowe Borland; C. Henry Gordon; Jed Prouty
- Cinematography: Ted Tetzlaff
- Edited by: Chandler House
- Production company: Paramount Pictures
- Distributed by: Paramount Pictures
- Release date: September 10, 1937
- Running time: 62 minutes
- Country: United States
- Language: English

Sophie Lang Goes West is a 1937 American crime film directed by Charles Reisner, written by Frederick Irving Anderson, Doris Anderson, Brian Marlow and Robert Wyler, and starring Gertrude Michael, Lee Bowman, Sandra Storme, Buster Crabbe, Barlowe Borland, C. Henry Gordon and Jed Prouty. It was released on September 10, 1937, by Paramount Pictures.

Sophie Lang Goes West is the third and last film of the Sophie Lang series, after The Notorious Sophie Lang (1934), and The Return of Sophie Lang (1936).

== Cast ==
- Gertrude Michael as Sophie Lang
- Lee Bowman as Eddie Rollyn
- Sandra Storme as Helga Roma
- Buster Crabbe as Steve Clayson
- Barlowe Borland as Archie Banks
- C. Henry Gordon as Sultan of Padaya
- Jed Prouty as J.H. Blaine
- Rafael Storm as Laj
- Fred Miller as Policeman
- Herbert Ransom as Policeman
- Nick Lukats as Taxi Driver
- Guy Usher as Police Inspector Parr
- Archie Twitchell as Clerk
- Robert Cummings as Curley Griffin
- Ralph McCullough as Hotel Clerk
