= The Return of Sophie Lang =

1936 film by George Archainbaud

- Directed by: George Archainbaud
- Screenplay by: Frederick Irving Anderson; Brian Marlow; Patterson McNutt
- Produced by: A.M. Botsford
- Starring: Gertrude Michael; Guy Standing; Ray Milland; Elizabeth Patterson; Colin Tapley; Paul Harvey
- Cinematography: George T. Clemens
- Edited by: Richard C. Currier
- Production company: Paramount Pictures
- Distributed by: Paramount Pictures
- Release date: June 18, 1936
- Running time: 65 minutes
- Country: United States
- Language: English

The Return of Sophie Lang is a 1936 American drama film directed by George Archainbaud and written by Frederick Irving Anderson, Brian Marlow and Patterson McNutt. The film stars Gertrude Michael, Guy Standing, Ray Milland, Elizabeth Patterson, Colin Tapley and Paul Harvey. The film was released on June 18, 1936, by Paramount Pictures.

The Return of Sophie Lang is the second film of the Sophie Lang series, between The Notorious Sophie Lang (1934) and Sophie Lang Goes West (1937).

== Plot ==
The notorious jewel thief Sophie Lang wants to leave her life of crime behind and go straight. To do so, she fakes her own death and retires to London. There, she finds work as a companion to a wealthy elderly woman who is also a jewelry collector. One day, her employer decides to take a sea voyage to the United States and takes Sophie with her. She also takes a $200,000 diamond, which she locks in the ship's safe. The diamond is soon stolen. A journalist on board the ship becomes suspicious of Sophie's true identity. Sophie must find the real thief and recover the jewel before the ship docks in New York, as an investigation could reveal her true identity.

== Cast ==
- Gertrude Michael as Sophie Lang / Ethel Thomas
- Guy Standing as Max Bernard
- Ray Milland as Jimmy Dawson
- Elizabeth Patterson as Araminta Sedley
- Colin Tapley as Larry
- Paul Harvey as Insp. Parr
- Garry Owen as 'Nosey' Schwartz
- Don Rowan as 'Buttons' McDermott
- Purnell Pratt as Thomas Chadwick
- Ellen Drew as Secretary
- Ted Oliver as Detective #1
- James Blaine as Detective #2
