= Mrs Patrick Campbell =

British stage actress (1865–1940)

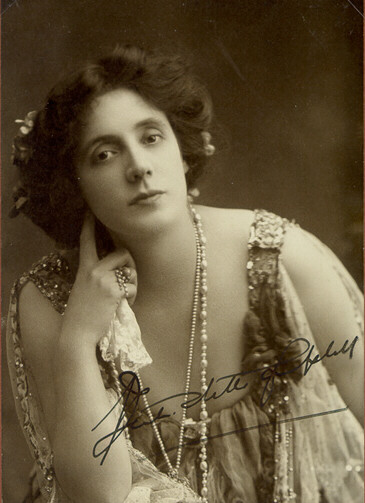
- Born: Beatrice Rose Stella Tanner; 9 February 1865; Kensington, London, England
- Died: 9 April 1940 (age 75); Pau, Pyrénées-Atlantiques, France
- Other name: Mrs Pat
- Occupation: Actress
- Years active: 1888–1935
- Spouses: Patrick Campbell (m. 1884; died 1900) George Cornwallis-West (m. 1914)
- Children: 2

Beatrice Rose Stella Tanner (9 February 1865 – 9 April 1940), better known by her stage name Mrs Patrick Campbell or Mrs Pat, was an English stage actress, best known for appearing in plays by Shakespeare, Shaw and Barrie. These included Shaw's Pygmalion where she originated the role of Cockney flower girl Eliza Doolittle in the West End in 1914. She also toured the United States and appeared briefly in films.

== Early life ==
Campbell was born Beatrice Rose Stella Tanner in Kensington, London, to John Tanner (1829–1895), son and heir of a wealthy British Army contractor to the British East India Company, and Maria Luigia Giovanna ("Louisa Joanna") née Romanini (1836–1908), daughter of "Count" Angelo Romanini, an Italian political exile.

Her father John Tanner, a descendant of Thomas Tanner, Bishop of St Asaph, was a consul and merchant who "managed to get through two large fortunes", in part through losses in the Indian Mutiny. Her mother, Luigia Giovanna Romanini, was one of the eight daughters of Angelo Romanini, a nobleman of Brescia, and his wife Rosa (née Polinelli, of Milan). Angelo had joined the Carbonari and, as a result, had to leave Italy. He and his family travelled over Eastern Europe aided by a firman from the Sultan of Turkey. They finally found political refuge in England. Six of his eight daughters, all under eighteen, married Englishmen.

She studied for a short time at the Guildhall School of Music.

== Stage career ==
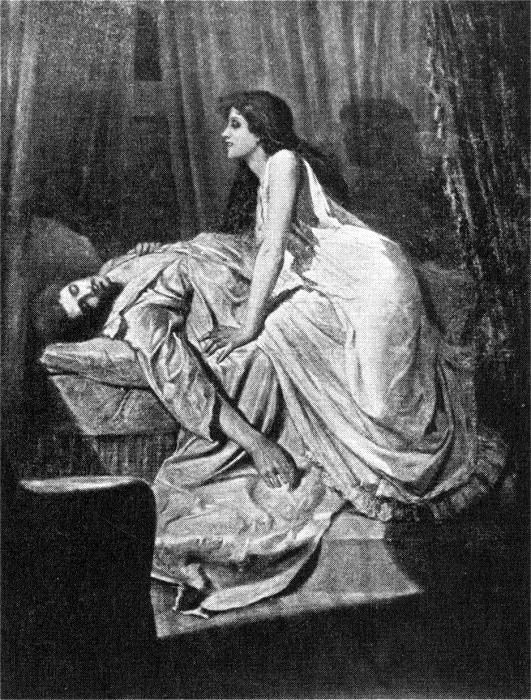
1897 The Vampire, Philip Burne-Jones' most famous work; modeled by Campbell

Campbell made her professional stage debut in 1888 at the Alexandra Theatre, Liverpool, four years after her marriage to Patrick Campbell. In March 1890, she appeared in London at the Adelphi, where she afterward played again in 1891–93. She became successful after starring in Sir Arthur Wing Pinero's play, The Second Mrs Tanqueray (1893) at St. James's Theatre where she also appeared in The Masqueraders (1894). She had another success as Kate Cloud in John-a-Dreams (1894), produced by Beerbohm Tree at the Haymarket, and again as Agnes in The Notorious Mrs. Ebbsmith (1895) at the Garrick.

Among her other performances were those in Fédora (1895), Little Eyolf (1896), and her notable performances with Forbes-Robertson at the Lyceum in London's West End in the roles of Juliet in Romeo and Juliet, Ophelia in Hamlet, and Lady Macbeth (1895–98) in Macbeth. Once established as a major star, Campbell assisted in the early careers of some noted actors, such as Gerald Du Maurier and George Arliss.

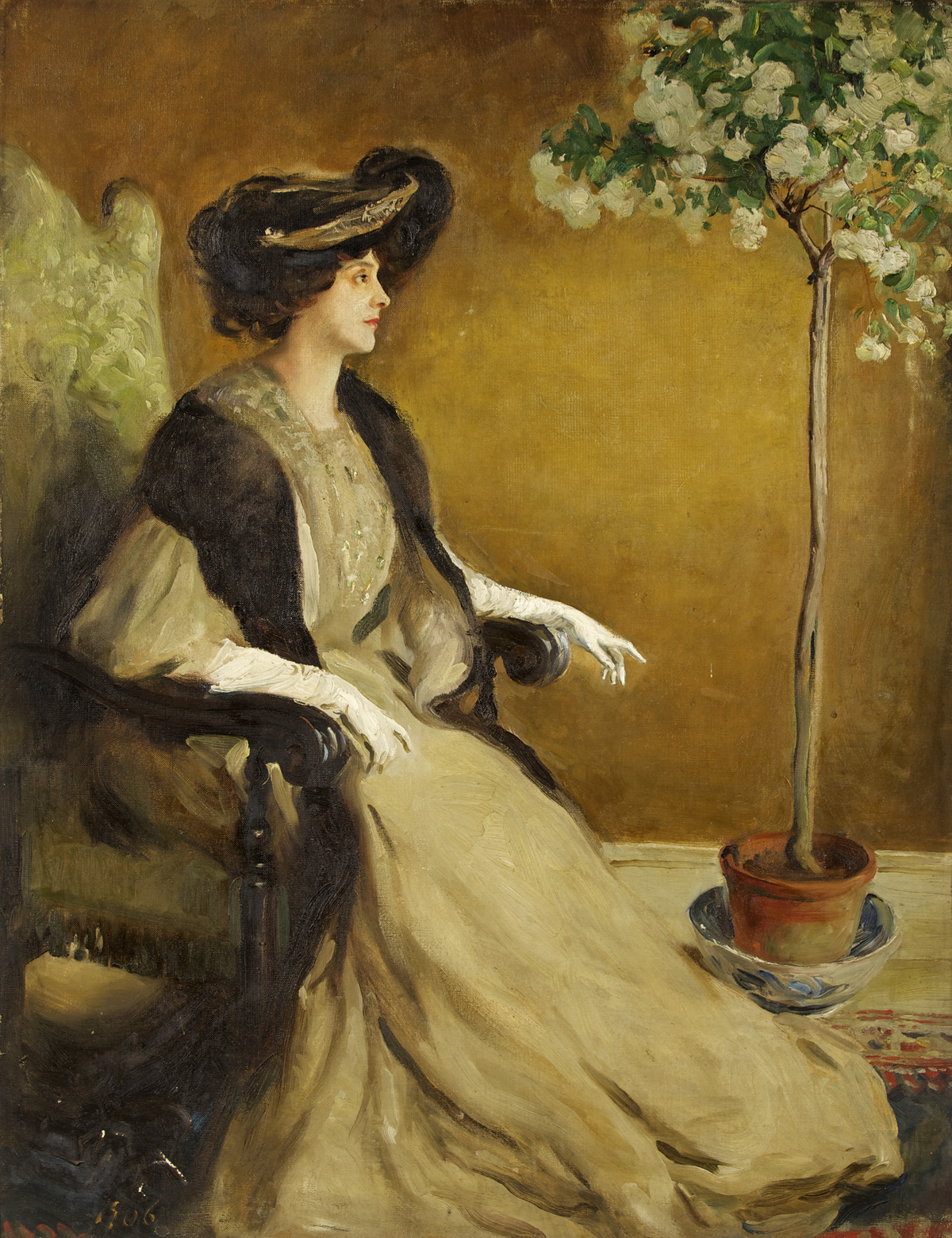
Portrait of Campbell in 1906 by William Bruce Ellis Ranken

In 1900, Campbell, having become her own manager/director, made her debut performance on Broadway in New York City in Heimat by Hermann Sudermann, a marked success. Subsequent appearances in New York and on tour in the U.S. established her as a major theatrical presence there. Campbell would regularly perform on the New York stage until 1933. Other performances included roles in The Joy of Living (1902), Pelléas et Mélisande (1904; as Melisande to the Pelleas of her friend Sarah Bernhardt), Hedda Gabler (1907), Electra, The Thunderbolt (both 1908), and Bella Donna (1911).

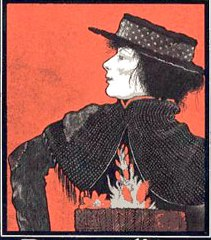
Campbell as Eliza for Pygmalion

In 1914, she played Eliza Doolittle in the original West End production of Pygmalion, which George Bernard Shaw had expressly written for her. Although forty-nine years old when she originated the role opposite the Henry Higgins of Sir Herbert Beerbohm Tree, she triumphed and took the play to New York and on tour in 1915 with the much younger Philip Merivale playing Higgins. She successfully played Eliza again in a 1920 London revival of the play.

A couple of Campbell's later significant performances were as the title role in the 1922 West End production of Henrik Ibsen's play Hedda Gabler and Mrs. Alving in the 1928 Ibsen Centennial staging of Ghosts (with John Gielgud as her son Oswald). Her last major stage role was in the Broadway production of Ivor Novello's play A Party, where she portrayed the cigar-smoking, Pekingese-wielding actress Mrs. MacDonald – a clear takeoff on her own well-known persona – and made off with the best reviews. In her later years, Campbell made notable appearances in films, including One More River, Riptide (both 1934), and Crime and Punishment (1935). Her tendency, however, to reject roles that could have vitally helped her career in later years caused Alexander Woollcott to declare "... she was like a sinking ship firing on the rescuers".

== Relationship with George Bernard Shaw ==
In the late 1890s, Campbell first became aware of George Bernard Shaw – the famous and feared dramatic critic for The Saturday Review – who lavishly praised her better performances and thoroughly criticised her lesser efforts. Shaw had already used her as inspiration for some of his plays before their first meeting in 1897 when he unsuccessfully tried to persuade Campbell to play the role of Judith Anderson in the first production of his play The Devil's Disciple. Not until 1912, when they began negotiations for the London production of Pygmalion, did Shaw develop an infatuation for Campbell that resulted in a passionate, yet unconsummated, love affair of mutual fascination and a legendary exchange of letters. It was Campbell who broke off the relationship, although Shaw was about to direct her in Pygmalion. They remained friends in spite of the break-up and her subsequent marriage to George Cornwallis-West, but Shaw never again allowed her to originate any of the roles he had written with her in mind (e.g. Hesione Hushabye in Heartbreak House, the Serpent in Back to Methuselah, etc.). When Anthony Asquith was preparing to produce the 1938 film of Pygmalion, Shaw suggested Campbell for the role of Mrs. Higgins, but she declined.

In later years, Shaw refused to allow the impoverished Campbell to publish or sell any of their letters except in heavily edited form, for fear of upsetting his wife Charlotte Payne-Townshend and the possible harm that the letters might cause to his public image. Most of the letters were not published until 1952, two years after Shaw's death.

== Famous quotes ==
Campbell was known for her sharp wit. Her best-known remark, uttered upon hearing about a male homosexual relationship, was, “My dear, I don’t care what they do, so long as they don’t do it in the street and frighten the horses” (although this remark has been attributed to others as well).

At a dinner in the United States, she was seated next to a scientist who talked incessantly to her about ants. “They even have their own police force and army”, he enthused. “No navy?” she replied.

== Personal life ==
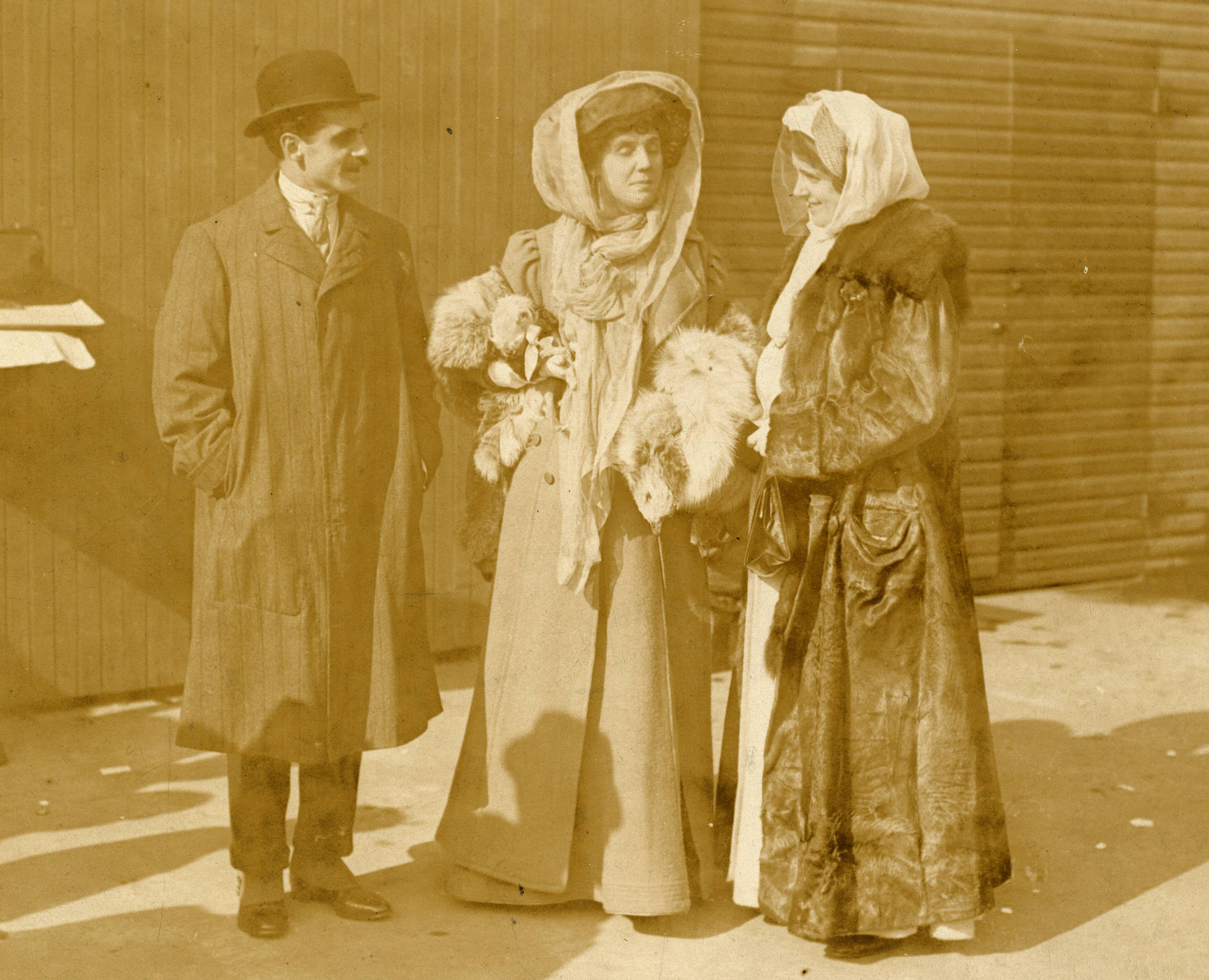
Campbell (centre) with her children Alan and Stella, c. 1909

In 1884, she eloped with Patrick Campbell (1855–1900) to St Helen's Church, Bishopsgate in central London while pregnant with their child, Alan "Beo" Urquhart Campbell. Patrick was the son of Patrick McMicken Campbell, a banker and chief manager of the Oriental Bank Corporation, and Anne Montgomerie (née Kerr). They had first met four months prior at a card party at the house of Mrs. Gifford in Dulwich. Their second child, Stella Campbell, was born in 1886.

Patrick's health was poor, and in 1887 he was ordered by his doctor to take a sea voyage. He went to Australia, and later to South Africa, staying for six-and-a-half years. He found some work but never sent enough back for Beatrice and the children to live on. When he returned in 1893, she saw that "his health and energies were undermined by fever, failure, and the most bitter disappointments". In mid-March 1900, Patrick returned to South Africa to join Lord Chesham's Yeomanry in the Boer War in 1900. He was killed in a charge at Boshof on 5 April, the same action in which Colonel George de Villebois-Mareuil died.

Their son Beo worked as an actor and toured with his mother in 1908. Their daughter Stella (1886–1975) also joined her mother onstage, and toured with her in the United States, but "made up her mind to marry a man [Beatrice] scarcely knew, who had lived in Africa for many years".

In 1909, Campbell produced His Borrowed Plumes by Lady Randolph Churchill, whose husband, George Cornwallis-West, was "seriously attracted to me". They married on 6 April 1914, the day after the decree absolute of his divorce. Notwithstanding her second marriage, she continued to use the stage name Mrs Patrick Campbell.

Campbell died on 9 April 1940 in Pau, France, aged 75, of pneumonia and was buried in the Cimetière urbain de Pau. Her death was one of the few deaths of a personal nature that George Bernard Shaw ever noted in his personal diaries.

== Legacy ==
A note book belonging to Campbell is housed at the University of Birmingham Special Collections Department. Several collections of Campbell's correspondence, including her letters to Shaw (MS Thr 372.1), are part of the Harvard Theatre Collection at Houghton Library, Harvard University. A number of her letters and her annotated script for Chester Bailey Fernald's The Moonlight Blossom are in the theatre manuscripts collection of the Harry Ransom Center, University of Texas at Austin. The Ransom Center's collection of Shaw papers includes letters from Campbell, and the library includes a number of Shaw's published works from Campbell's private library.

== Filmography ==
Year	Title	Role	Notes
1920	The Money Moon		
1930	The Dancers	Aunt Emily	
1934	Riptide	Aunt Hetty	
1934	One More River	Lady Mont	
1934	Outcast Lady	Lady Eve	
1935	Crime and Punishment	Pawnbroker	(final film role)
