= Michael and Mary =

1931 film

- Directed by: Victor Saville
- Written by: Lajos Bíró; Angus MacPhail; Robert Stevenson
- Based on: Michael and Mary by A. A. Milne
- Produced by: Michael Balcon
- Starring: Herbert Marshall; Edna Best; Frank Lawton
- Cinematography: Leslie Rowson
- Edited by: Ian Dalrymple
- Music by: Louis Levy
- Production company: Gainsborough Pictures
- Distributed by: Ideal Films; Universal Pictures (US)
- Release date: 4 November 1931
- Running time: 83 minutes
- Country: United Kingdom
- Language: English

Michael and Mary is a 1931 British drama film directed by Victor Saville and starring Elizabeth Allan, Edna Best, Frank Lawton, and Herbert Marshall. This was the first of the Edna Best and Herbert Marshall co-starring talkies. It was adapted by Lajos Bíró, Robert Stevenson and Angus MacPhail from the play of the same name by A.A. Milne. Produced by Gainsborough Pictures, it was shot at the company's Islington Studios in London with sets designed by the art director Alex Vetchinsky.

== Plot ==
A young bride is deserted by her husband but finds happiness with another man. They contract a bigamous marriage for the sake of their child.

The first husband turns up and starts blackmailing them. During a quarrel with the second husband, he dies. After some complications, their son learns the truth, but stands by them.

== Cast ==
- Herbert Marshall as Michael Rowe
- Edna Best as Mary Rowe
- Frank Lawton as David Rowe
- Elizabeth Allan as Romo
- D.A. Clarke-Smith as Harry Price
- Ben Field as Tullivant
- Margaret Yarde as Mrs. Tullivant
- Sunday Wilshin as Violet Cunliffe

== Reception ==
The film was voted the third best British movie of 1932. With a shortened running time of 76 minutes, it was distributed in America by Universal Pictures.

Film Weekly wrote: "The very strong attraction of Michael and Mary is due to a delightful story, almost perfect acting, and clever and sympathetic direction."

Kine Weekly wrote: "This simple love romance, which is adapted from A. A. Milne's successful play, is told with exquisite charm and tenderness, and carries an irresistible general appeal. The producer, except tor a slight tendency towards slowness in development, handles the theme with sensitiveness and understanding, and cleverly holds the interest as the picture works up to a moving climax, the strength of which lies in its delightful humanity."

== Radio adaptation ==
Michael and Mary was presented on the US radio programme Hollywood Sound Stage on 20 March 1952. The 30-minute adaptation starred Deborah Kerr and Herbert Marshall.
