= The Dead Alive =

1874 novella by Wilkie Collins

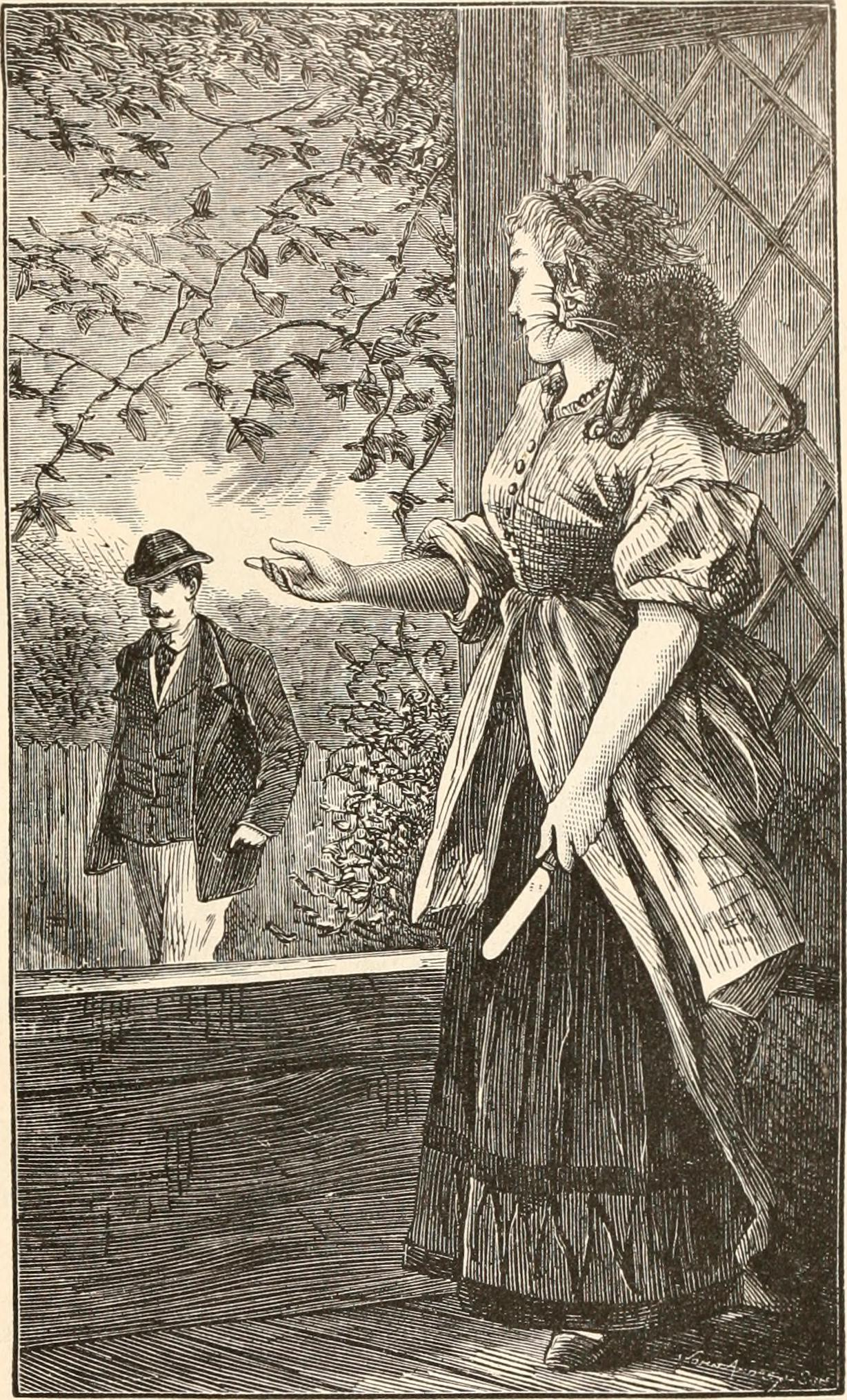
Extract from Tribune popular science (1974) by Louis Agassiz

The Dead Alive, also called John Jago's Ghost, is a novella written in 1874 by Wilkie Collins based on the Boorn Brothers murder case. It was reprinted with a side-by-side examination of the case by Rob Warden in 2005 by the Northwestern University Press.

== Radio adaptation ==
The Dead Alive was presented on Suspense March 9, 1953. The 30-minute adaptation starred Herbert Marshall.
