= Hollywood Star Time (dramatic anthology) =

1946-1947 radio dramatic anthology series

- Genre: Dramatic anthology
- Country of origin: United States
- Language: English
- Syndicates: CBS
- Announcer: Wendell Niles
- Written by: Milton Geiger
- Directed by: Robert Redd; Jack Johnstone
- Original release: January 6, 1946 – March 27, 1947
- Sponsored by: Frigidaire

Hollywood Star Time is a radio dramatic anthology series in the United States. It was broadcast on CBS January 6, 1946 – March 27, 1947.

== Format ==
A newspaper article announcing the debut of Hollywood Star Time described it as "featuring big-name movie talent and hit films." The first episode featured Tyrone Power and Jeanne Crain starring in Seventh Heaven. Other works presented on the program and leading actors in them included the following:

- The Song of Bernadette – Lee J. Cobb and Vanessa Brown
- Riders of the Purple Sage – George Montgomery and Lynn Bari
- The Lodger – Vincent Price
- The Lady Eve - Joan Blondell and John Lund
- Talk of the Town – Cary Grant, Herbert Marshall and Marguerite Chapman
- Hangover Square - Linda Darnell and Price.
- Murder My Sweet - Dick Powell and Joan Bennett

Hollywood Star Time was one of several radio programs classified as "prestige drama". That genre included The Screen Guild Theater, Hollywood Premiere, Academy Award Theater, The Dreft Star Playhouse, and the Screen Directors Playhouse. Radio historian John Dunning evaluated Hollywood Star Time by writing, "Its production was the equal of Screen Guild and a notch or so behind Lux."

== Personnel ==
By its nature, a program like Hollywood Star Time had few people who appeared regularly. The spotlight was on guest stars, who varied from week to week. Nevertheless, a few people did have continuing roles. Beginning October 12, 1946, Herbert Marshall was the program's permanent host. The other person heard regularly on the program was announcer Wendell Niles.

Behind the scenes, Robert Redd and Jack Johnstone were directors, and Alfred Newman was composer-conductor. Milton Geiger wrote the scripts.

== Tie-ins with studios ==
Early on, Hollywood Star Time had a business arrangement with 20th Century Fox whereby the program had exclusive rights to use of the studio's movies in return for free plugs on broadcasts. Fox apparently was not satisfied with the arrangement, however, and dropped it at the end of 13 weeks. Later, the program obtained an agreement with Universal-International for "exclusive rights to a series of U-I properties for consecutive presentation."

== See also ==
- Academy Award Theater
- Brownstone Theater
- The Dreft Star Playhouse
- Screen Directors' Playhouse
- The Screen Guild Theater
