= These Charming People =

1931 film directed by Louis Mercanton

- Directed by: Louis Mercanton
- Written by: Irving Howard; Hugh Perceval
- Based on: These Charming People by Michael Arlen
- Produced by: Walter Morosco
- Starring: Cyril Maude; Godfrey Tearle; Nora Swinburne
- Edited by: David Lean
- Music by: Percival Mackey
- Production company: Paramount British Pictures
- Distributed by: Paramount British Pictures
- Release date: 23 July 1931
- Running time: 82 minutes
- Country: United Kingdom
- Language: English

These Charming People is a 1932 British drama film directed by Louis Mercanton and starring Cyril Maude, Godfrey Tearle and Nora Swinburne. It was produced at Elstree Studios outside London by the British subsidiary of Paramount Pictures. It was based on the 1925 Broadway play of the same name by Michael Arlen.

== Cast ==
- Cyril Maude as Colonel Crawford
- Godfrey Tearle as James Berridge
- Nora Swinburne as Julia Berridge
- Ann Todd as Pamela Crawford
- Anthony Ireland as Geoffrey Allen
- Cyril Raymond as Miles Winter
- C. V. France as Minx
- Bill Shine (actor) as Ulysses Wiggins

== Bibliography ==
- Low, Rachael. Filmmaking in 1930s Britain. George Allen & Unwin, 1985.
- Wood, Linda. British Films, 1927–1939. British Film Institute, 1986.
