= The Calendar (1948 film) =

1948 British film by Arthur Crabtree

- Original pressbook
- Directed by: Arthur Crabtree
- Written by: Geoffrey Kerr
- Based on: The Calendar by Edgar Wallace
- Produced by: Antony Darnborough
- Starring: Greta Gynt; John McCallum
- Cinematography: Cyril J. Knowles; Reginald H. Wyer
- Edited by: Jean Barker
- Music by: Arthur Wilkinson
- Production company: Gainsborough Pictures
- Distributed by: General Film Distributors (UK); Eagle Lion (US)
- Release dates: 26 May 1948 (London, UK)
- Running time: 79 minutes
- Country: United Kingdom
- Language: English
- Box office: £92,000 (by July 1953(

The Calendar is a black and white 1948 British drama film directed by Arthur Crabtree and starring Greta Gynt, John McCallum, Raymond Lovell and Leslie Dwyer. It was written by Geoffery Kerr based on the 1929 play The Calendar and subsequent novel by Edgar Wallace. A previous version had been released in 1931.

== Plot ==
Garry is a racehorse owner. After he loses money at the races, his fiancee Wenda jilts him and marries Lord Willis Panniford, whose sister Molly trains Garry's horses.

Whilst drowning his sorrows, Garry becomes involved in a big-race scandal. The plot is to steal his own prize horse before a race, therefore increasing the odds in another big upcoming race, the Ascot Gold Cup.

Stewards run an inquiry into the running of Garry's horse. Wenda is called as a witness. She denies that Garry's first telegram telling her not to back his horse was cancelled out by another message from him, which was sent before the race.

Molly knows that Garry stopped the dishonest running plan. She gets Garry's second note that he had originally sent to Wenda, and shows it to the stewards just before the running of the Gold Cup race.

Garry is cleared of all charges.

== Cast ==
- Greta Gynt as Wenda Panniford
- John McCallum as Captain Garry Anson
- Raymond Lovell as Lord Willie Panniford
- Sonia Holm as Lady Mollie Panniford
- Leslie Dwyer as Sam Hillcott
- Charles Victor as John Dory
- Felix Aylmer as Lord Forlingham
- Diana Dors as Hawkins
- Cyril Chamberlain as Customs Official
- Sidney King as Tony
- Noel Howlett as lawyer
- Barry Jones as Sir John Garth
- Claude Bailey as Lord Inspond
- Desmond Roberts as Rainby
- Fred Payne as Andy Lynn

== Production ==
The Calendar had been a popular novel and play which was previously filmed in 1931. Sydney Box decided on a remake as part of his slate of movies at Gainsborough Studios.

In June 1947, Gainsborough announced that the film would feature the comedy team of Basil Radford and Naunton Wayne. Neither actor appears in the final film. The film was to be one of two about horse racing made by Gainsborough the other being Becher's Brook. The films were scheduled to be directed by Maurice Elvey but he was fired by Gainsborough's head of production Sydney Box and replaced by Arthur Crabtree.

It was an early lead role for Australian actor John McCallum who had been in The Loves of Joanna Godden (1947). Filming took place in October 1947. It was mostly shot at Gainsborough's Islington studios in London. There was location filming at Ascot and Hurst Park. It was the first time royal permission was given to film on the royal course.

== Reception ==
=== Box office ===
By July 1953, its net revenue was £93,000 a performance regarded by John Davis of Rank as "average".

=== Critical ===
The Monthly Film Bulletin wrote: "Well constructed, the film has plenty of humour supplied mostly by the valet, a typical Wallace character, and some exciting race sequences. Glimpses of famous English racecourses, including genuine newsreel shots of the arrival of the King and Queen at Epsom, should ensure its popularity in America. Greta Gynt and John McCallum are excellently cast as Wenda and Garry, whilst Sonia Holm is attractive as Mollie."

Kine Weekly wrote: "The characterisation is not exactly flawless and much of the humour is forced but the intermittent race thrills and spectacular Gold Cup finale are exceedingly well-handled and enable it to run out a comfortable winner... Director of Photography Reg Wyer is mainly responsible for the not inconsiderable triumph."

David Parkinson, in the Radio Times, wrote, "British cinema was heavily dependent on the mysteries of Edgar Wallace in the early talkie era. Few of these creaky thrillers were ever remade, until someone at Gainsborough Productions felt the need to bring this veritable stage warhorse under starter's orders for a second time. It's all clipped accents and impossibly earnest hamming from the off...fans of Dick Francis may find it amusing."

Halliwell's Film and Video Guide called it a "very average racecourse melodrama."

Britmovie described the film as a "tepid melodrama".
