= Till We Meet Again (1936 film) =

1936 film by Robert Florey

- Directed by: Robert Florey
- Screenplay by: Edwin Justus Mayer; Brian Marlow; Franklin Coen
- Based on: play by Alfred Davis
- Produced by: Albert Lewis; William LeBaron
- Starring: Herbert Marshall; Gertrude Michael; Lionel Atwill; Rod La Rocque
- Cinematography: Victor Milner
- Edited by: Richard C. Currier
- Music by: Friedrich Hollaender
- Production company: Paramount Pictures
- Distributed by: Paramount Pictures
- Release date: April 4, 1936
- Running time: 72 minutes
- Country: United States
- Language: English

Till We Meet Again is a 1936 American romantic drama film directed by Robert Florey and starring Herbert Marshall, Gertrude Michael and Lionel Atwill. Marshall and Michael also starred in Make Way for a Lady, released later in 1936.

== Plot ==
On the eve of World War I, Austrian stage star Elsa Duranyi and her English counterpart Alan Barclay plan to marry. But she disappears and he enters the intelligence service, adopting the identity of a dead man. In Monte Carlo, he encounters his former fiancée only to discover that she is also spying for her country.

== Cast ==
- Herbert Marshall as Alan Barclay
- Gertrude Michael as Elsa Duranyi
- Lionel Atwill as Ludwig
- Rod La Rocque as Carl Schrottle
- Guy Bates Post as Captain Minton
- Vallejo Gantner as Vogel
- Torben Meyer as Kraus
- Julia Faye as Nurse
- Egon Brecher as Schultz
- Frank Reicher as Colonel Von Diegel
