= Herbert Marshall =

English actor (1890–1966)

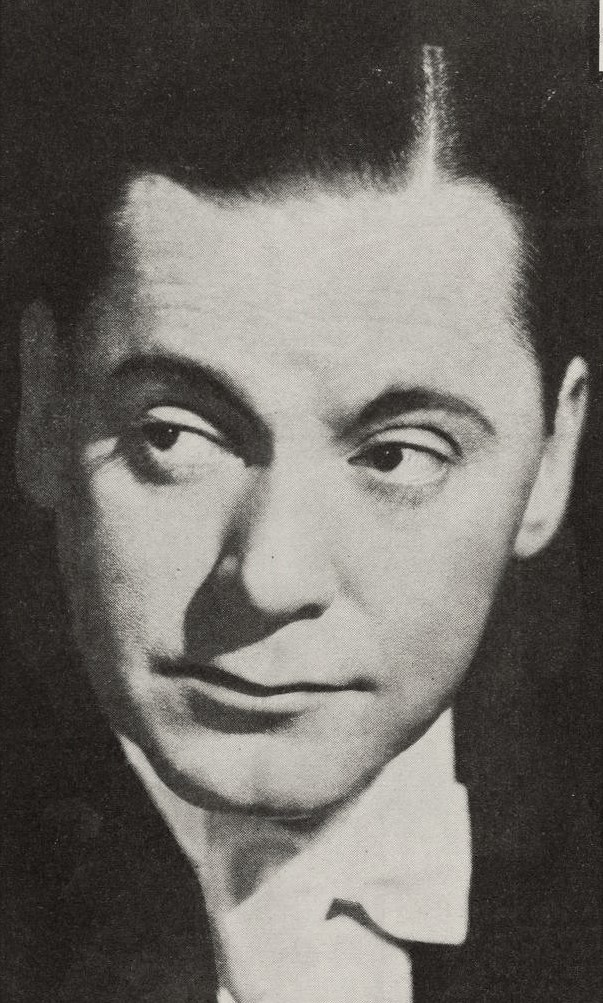
- Marshall in 1934
- Born: Herbert Brough Falcon Marshall; 23 May 1890; London, England
- Died: 22 January 1966 (aged 75); Beverly Hills, California, U.S.
- Occupation: Actor
- Years active: 1911–1965
- Spouses: Mollie Maitland (m. 1915; div. 1928) Edna Best (m. 1928; div. 1940) Lee Russell (m. 1940; div. 1947) Boots Mallory (m. 1947; died 1958) Dee Anne Kahmann (m. 1960)
- Children: 2, including Sarah Marshall

Herbert Brough Falcon Marshall (23 May 1890 – 22 January 1966) was an English actor of stage, screen, and radio. He starred in many popular and well-regarded Hollywood films in the 1930s and 1940s. After a successful theatrical career in the United Kingdom and North America, he became an in-demand Hollywood leading man, frequently appearing in romantic melodramas and occasional comedies. In his later years, Marshall turned to character acting.

The son of actors, Marshall is best known for roles in Ernst Lubitsch's Trouble in Paradise (1932), Alfred Hitchcock's Murder! (1930) and Foreign Correspondent (1940), William Wyler's The Letter (1940) and The Little Foxes (1941), Albert Lewin's The Moon and Sixpence (1942), Edmund Goulding's The Razor's Edge (1946), and Kurt Neumann's The Fly (1958). He appeared onscreen with many of the most prominent leading ladies of Hollywood's Golden Age, including Barbara Stanwyck, Greta Garbo, Marlene Dietrich, Kay Francis, Joan Crawford, Jean Arthur and Bette Davis.

From 1944 to 1952, Marshall starred in the American radio espionage series The Man Called 'X'. Often praised for the quality of his voice, he made numerous radio guest appearances and hosted several shows. He performed on television as well. Known for his charm, Marshall married five times and periodically appeared in gossip columns because of his sometimes turbulent private life. A leg amputee due to injuries sustained during the First World War, he worked for the rehabilitation of injured troops, especially aiding amputees like himself, during the Second World War. Marshall received a star on the Hollywood Walk of Fame in 1960.

== Early years ==
Marshall was born in London in 1890, as the only child of stage actors Percy F. Marshall and Ethel May Turner. Theatrical critics praised his father for his comic flair and "rich voice". In addition to acting, Percy wrote and directed some plays in which he appeared. Most popular in the 1880s and 1890s, Marshall's father retired from acting in 1922 and died on 28 December 1927 at the age of 68. Marshall later recalled: "My father was a grand actor—better than I could ever dream of being." His mother was the sister of journalist and drama critic, Leopold Godfrey-Turner (born Leopold McClintock Turner). Marshall's grandfather, Godfrey Wordsworth Turner, wrote several books and articles on art and travel. In an article about his love of the theatre, he noted that one of his uncles was an actor. Godfrey was also the grandnephew of influential businessman Edward Wollstonecraft, who was the nephew of women's rights activist and author Mary Wollstonecraft and first cousin of Mary Wollstonecraft Shelley, who wrote the horror classic Frankenstein.

As a boy, Herbert's mother gave him the nickname Bart because she feared he would be known as Bertie, "a name then in vogue that she disliked". His family, friends and personal acquaintances continued to call him Bart for the rest of his life. He was also periodically referred to by his nickname in the press. While introduced by his given name, he was usually addressed as Bart on the radio. His parents gave him the middle name Brough (pronounced /ˈbrʌf/ BRUF) after his godfather, comedic Shakespearean actor Lionel Brough.

As a child, Marshall was brought up by his three maternal aunts while his parents toured in theatrical productions. During school vacations, however, they took him with them. These early experiences initially gave him a negative view of the theatre:

I used to tour the provinces in England with my mother and father, you know, when I was a small lad. And I was often tired and cold, there seemed to me to be so much heartache and poverty and disappointment that the glamour and applause and tinsel of the theatre escaped me, quite...No, I had no reason to love the theatre...I spent most of my time trying to forget those tired faces which the footlights served only to illumine, mockingly.

=== Early acting career ===
After education at St Mary's College in Harlow, Essex, Marshall worked for a time as an accounting clerk. After being sacked for the slow speed of his calculations, he took a job as an assistant business manager of a theatre troupe run by a friend of his father's. He later had a series of different backstage jobs at various theatres and acting companies. When a troupe he worked for reformed, he was laid off. He then tried his hand at acting. In a 1935 interview, he claimed that he only became an actor out of necessity because he did not know how to do anything else. To another reporter, he recollected how he had initially vowed never to go on the stage.

Marshall had a long and varied stage career, appearing with Sir Nigel Playfair, Sir Gerald du Maurier, Noël Coward, Gertrude Lawrence, Edna Best (his second wife), Cathleen Nesbitt, Mabel Terry-Lewis, Marie Löhr, Madge Titheradge, Edmund Gwenn (his future film and radio co-star) and others.

While his stage debut is usually listed as The Adventure of Lady Ursula (1911), some sources place it in 1909. Furthermore, Marshall remembered playing a footman alongside Eric Blore in Robert Courtneidge's The Arcadians; his mention of Blore added an appearance in November 1910.

In 1913, Marshall made his London debut in the role of Tommy in Brewster's Millions. Actor-manager Cyril Maude was so impressed with his performance that he recruited Marshall for his U.S. and Canadian tour of Grumpy. When war was declared, the company returned to London, and the 24-year-old enlisted in the London Regiment.

== War injury ==
Marshall served with the 14th (County of London) Battalion, London Regiment (London Scottish). He recalled his time on the Western Front: "I knew terrific boredom. There was no drama lying in the trenches 10 months. I must have felt fear, but I don't remember it. I was too numb to recall any enterprise on my part." On 9 April 1917 he was shot in the left knee by a sniper at the Second Battle of Arras in France. After a succession of operations, doctors were forced to amputate his leg. Marshall remained hospitalised for 13 months. He later recalled in private that after his injury, he had initially over-dramatised his loss and was wrapped up in self-pity and bitterness. Before long, however, he decided he wanted to return to the theatre and learned how to walk well with a prosthetic leg in order to do so. While he was recovering at St Thomas's in London, King George V visited the hospital. When asked to indicate which of Marshall's legs he thought was artificial, the king chose the wrong one. Throughout his career, Marshall largely managed to hide the fact that he had a prosthetic limb, although it was occasionally reported in the press.

Marshall suffered from his war injury for the rest of his life, both from phantom pain common to amputees and from the prosthesis. One friend remembered that he kept holes in his trouser pocket so that he could inconspicuously loosen a strap on his prosthetic leg in order to ease sudden discomfort. The pain in his leg became more pronounced later in life, including bothering him on film shoots in ways noticeable to others and exacerbating his usually very slight limp.

== Return to acting ==
=== Theatre ===
Following the Armistice, Marshall joined Nigel Playfair's repertory troupe, appearing in Make Believe (December 1918), The Younger Generation (1919) and Abraham Lincoln (1919). In 1920, he made his first known appearance opposite Edna Best in Brown Sugar. He also appeared in John Ferguson and the Shakespearean plays The Merchant of Venice and As You Like It. Marshall recalled "Jacques in As You Like It has given me more pleasure than any part I have played". The following year, he toured North America with Australian star Marie Löhr and starred in A Safety Match in London. By 1922, Marshall was making regular appearances on both sides of the Atlantic, debuting on Broadway in The Voice from the Minaret and starring in Coward's The Young Idea (with then-wife Maitland) and The Queen Was in the Parlour. Among his other successes were Aren't We All? (1923), The Pelican (1924–25), Lavender Ladies (1925), Interference (1927–28), S.O.S. (1928) and Tomorrow and Tomorrow (1931). His greatest hits with Edna Best were the aforementioned Brown Sugar, These Charming People (1925–26), The High Road (1928–29), Michael and Mary (1930), The Swan (1930) and There's Always Juliet (1931–1932).

=== Early films ===
In 1927, Marshall debuted onscreen opposite Pauline Frederick in the British silent film Mumsie (1927). He made his first American film appearance as the lover of Jeanne Eagels's character in the first version of The Letter (1929), produced at Paramount Pictures' Astoria studios two years later.

After The Letter, in Britain once again, he notably starred in Alfred Hitchcock's Murder! (1930). The following year, he returned to Paramount to make Secrets of a Secretary.

In Britain he made three films with Edna Best: Michael and Mary (1931), for Victor Saville, The Calendar (1931) and The Faithful Heart (1931) again for Saville.

Marshall returned to Broadway to star in Tomorrow and Tomorrow then There's Always Juliet. He primarily made films in the United States for the remainder of his life.

== Romantic roles ==
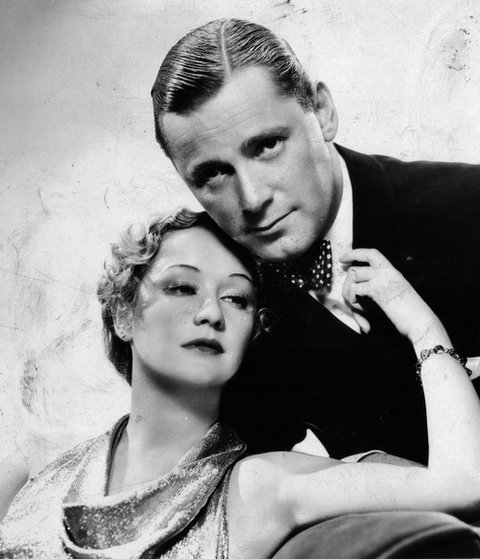
Marshall and Miriam Hopkins in a publicity photo for Trouble in Paradise (1932)

Marshall played romantic roles opposite such stars as Claudette Colbert, Marlene Dietrich, Greta Garbo, Barbara Stanwyck, Katharine Hepburn, Joan Crawford and Bette Davis throughout the 1930s and into the 1940s.

The 1932 film Blonde Venus brought Marshall to fame among the general American public. Later the same year, he played Gaston Monescu, a sophisticated thief involved in a love triangle in Ernst Lubitsch's suggestive, light comedy Trouble in Paradise (1932). In interviews, Marshall expressed a preference for playing this sort of witty comedy role. He discussed his two early films in a 1935 interview:

I am strongly of the belief that if there had been another 'Blond Venus'—my first picture (sic), with the acute direction of von Sternberg—I would have been thrown off the screen! By the grace of God and Lubitsch, against the wishes of his company, I was next cast in a good role in 'Trouble in Paradise' for which Lubitsch seemed to think me peculiarly suited and would have been very unhappy if he had had anyone else.

He was suave in Evenings for Sale (1932) then returned to England briefly to make I Was a Spy (1933) with Saville. He was in a play in London Another Man which flopped.

Back in Hollywood MGM cast him in The Solitaire Man (1933) then for Cecil B. De Mille he appeared opposite Claudette Colbert in Four Frightened People (1934).

MGM used him for Riptide (1934) with Norma Shearer, Outcast Lady (1934) with Constance Bennett and The Painted Veil (1934) with Greta Garbo. Marshall, who often played kind and proper husbands betrayed by their wives, told several reporters that he was tired of such "gentleman" roles. Although another cuckolded husband, he appreciated his part in The Painted Veil (1934) with Garbo because his character was able to show "intestinal fortitude".

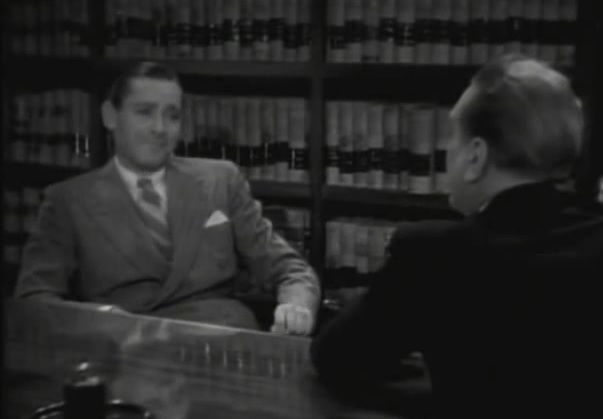
Marshall and Frank Morgan in The Good Fairy (1935)

The Good Fairy (1935) had him as Margaret Sullavan's leading man; he made The Flame Within (1935) with Ann Harding, Accent on Youth (1935) with Sylvia Sidney, The Dark Angel (1935) with Fredric March and Merle Oberon, If You Could Only Cook (1935) with Jean Arthur, and The Lady Consents (1936) with Harding.

He did three films with Gertrude Michael, Till We Meet Again (1936), Forgotten Faces (1936) and Make Way for a Lady (1936), then made Girls' Dormitory (1936) with Ruth Chatterton and A Woman Rebels (1936) with Katharine Hepburn.

Marshall was reunited with Dietrich and Lubtisch in Angel (1937). He made Breakfast for Two (1937), Always Goodbye (1938) with Barbara Stanwyck, and supported Deanna Durbin in Mad About Music (1938).

By mid-decade, the press noted how popular he was as a romantic actor. Syndicated columnist Edwin Schallert wrote: "The demand for Herbert Marshall's talents continues to spread far and wide. Even the newer and younger leading women, it is felt, need to have his proficient romanticism displayed in their pictures." Another reporter referred to him as the current "vogue in leading men" and noted that the top actresses often asked for him to appear with them.

After Woman Against Woman (1938), Marshall was reunited with Colbert in Zaza (1938).

== Second World War ==
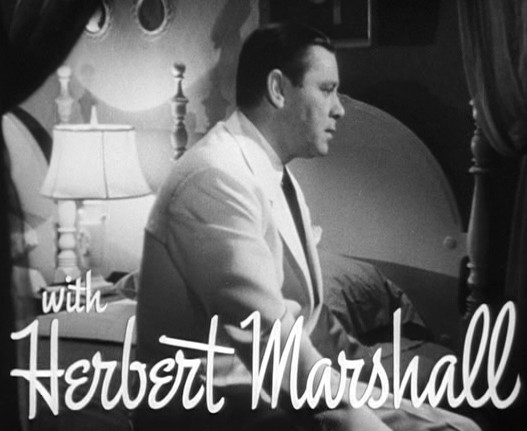
Marshall in the trailer for The Letter (1940)

During the 1940s, Marshall was less associated with romantic leading man parts. He supported Maureen O'Hara in A Bill of Divorcement (1940) and played a villain for Hitchcock in Foreign Correspondent (1940). Marshall had one of his more famous roles when cast as Bette Davis' cuckolded husband in The Letter (1940), directed by William Wyler with Bette Davis; Marshall previously appeared in a silent film version of this play.

After making Adventure in Washington (1941) Marshall starred as maltreated, principled husband Horace Giddens in The Little Foxes, again with Davis and Wyler, which received nine Academy Award nominations including one for Best Picture. The film's review in Variety noted "Marshall turns in one of his top performances in the exacting portrayal of a suffering, dying man."

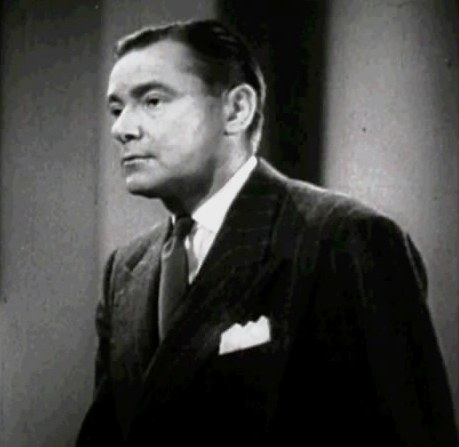
Marshall in the trailer for Foreign Correspondent (1940)

During the Second World War, Marshall made numerous appearances on the Armed Forces Radio Service (AFRS), hosting The Globe Theatre and guest-starring on Command Performance and Mail Call, among other programmes. He was also one of the leaders of a Hollywood British committee that helped organise the community's contributions to British war relief. In 1940, Marshall co-starred with Rosalind Russell in Noël Coward's Still Life (from Tonight at 8.30) at the El Capitan. The proceeds went to the British Red Cross. In 1943, he appeared briefly in the RKO film, Forever and a Day. The profits from the film funded a variety of war charities. The same year, Marshall wrote a public letter of encouragement to his Hollywood colleagues serving overseas. He also performed in the short film, The Shining Future (1944), later condensed and renamed Road to Victory, which was intended to sell Canadian war bonds. Marshall and twenty-five other actors each received a plaque from a representative of the Canadian government for their participation in the film.

Marshall continued to act in films through the war, increasingly as a supporting actor: When Ladies Meet (1941), Kathleen (1941) with Shirley Temple, and The Moon and Sixpence (1942) where he played a character based on W. Somerset Maugham.

He could be seen in Flight for Freedom (1943), Young Ideas (1944), Andy Hardy's Blonde Trouble (1944), The Enchanted Cottage (1945) and The Unseen (1945).

=== Radio ===
In 1936, Marshall began lending his talents to radio, appearing on Lux Radio Theatre (at least 19 appearances), The Screen Guild Theatre (at least 16 appearances), The Jell-O Program (three appearances, including one as host), The Burns and Allen Show (two appearances), Birds Eye Open House, The Pepsodent Show and Hollywood Star Time (taking over as host in October 1946). He made radio history in July 1940 as the narrator of "The Lodger", the first audition show of the Suspense series (making 20 appearances on the program). His most famous role was as globetrotting intelligence agent Ken Thurston in The Man Called 'X' (1944–52). The series, first aired on CBS as a summer replacement for the Lux Radio Theatre, introduced Thurston as an employee of an agency known only as "The Bureau". His boss, dubbed "The Chief", tasked him with dealing with some of the world's most hardened, sophisticated criminals, including smugglers, murderers, black marketeers, saboteurs, kidnappers, various types of thieves, corrupt politicians and rogue scientists. Thurston's sidekick/nemesis Egon Zellschmidt was played by character actor Hans Conried during the first season. From 1945 to 1952, Russian comic and musician Leon Belasco appeared in the same role as Pegon Zellschmidt. The show was broadcast not only for the sake of entertainment but it also "alerted an anxious war-weary world to the inherent dangers of peace after war."

=== Work with amputees ===
Using his own money for travel, Marshall visited many military hospitals during the war. In particular, he focused on encouraging soldiers with amputations to keep a positive attitude and not to think of themselves as handicapped or limited. Despite his usual reluctance to discuss his own injury, he talked freely about his personal experiences in order to give these amputees tips on how to use and adjust to their new artificial limbs. Although mostly kept private, a 1945 article in Motion Picture Magazine reported, against Marshall's wishes, on his work at military hospitals. The author Patty De Roulf insisted that his story needed to be told to help injured veterans and their families and to show that "Marshall is doing one of the finest war jobs any human being can do." She interviewed one young officer, who recalled:

Herbert Marshall gave me back my life. When I found out I had a metal claw instead of a hand, I was completely broken...Then one day, while I was in the hospital, we were told Herbert Marshall, the film star, was coming to talk to us. I was disgusted with the idea. A collar ad, I thought, coming to give us a Pollyanna speech!

It turned out to be anything but that. Mr. Marshall talked real sense into us. He followed it up with demonstrations, actually showing us what he could do. Before he left, we were convinced that if he had been able to lead a normal life, we could do the same.

The article also quoted a veteran with a double amputation (left leg and right foot), who praised Marshall for showing him how to dance with a prosthetic leg. He considered the actor's advice and example to be his Ten Commandments. General Dwight D. Eisenhower, Head of the Allied Forces in Europe, noted in private that, of all the film stars he met in Europe during the war, he was most impressed with Marshall and Madeleine Carroll (who worked as a nurse at field hospitals).

== Postwar career ==
Marshall in Duel in the Sun (1946)

After the war, Marshall worked almost exclusively as a supporting actor in films: Crack-Up (1946), a noir; The Razor's Edge (1946), playing Somerset Maugham; Duel in the Sun (1946), the epic Western; Ivy (1947), with Joan Fontaine; High Wall (1947), another noir; The Secret Garden (1949) with Margaret O'Brien at MGM; The Underworld Story (1950); Black Jack (1950), billed second to George Sanders; and Anne of the Indies (1951).

=== Television ===
Beginning in 1950, Marshall performed periodically on television, starting with a production of An Inspector Calls for Robert Montgomery Presents. He was in The Ford Television Theatre. He appeared as the "mystery guest" on an episode of the popular game show What's My Line? in November 1954.

Marshall continued to appear in films such as Angel Face (1953), a film noir; Riders to the Stars (1954), his first sci fi; Gog (1954), another sci-fi in 3-D; The Black Shield of Falworth (1954) with Tony Curtis; The Virgin Queen (1955) with Davis; Wicked as They Come (1956) with Arlene Dahl; and The Weapon (1956). He received acclaim for his performances in Stage Struck (1958) and The Fly (1958).

However he was more likely to be found on television in The Best of Broadway (a version of The Philadelphia Story), The Elgin Hour, Celebrity Playhouse, Lux Video Theatre (including an adaptation of The Browning Version and Now, Voyager), The Loretta Young Show, Playhouse 90, Studio One in Hollywood, Alfred Hitchcock Presents, and Adventures in Paradise.

=== 1960s ===
Marshall's final performances include the feature films College Confidential (1960), Midnight Lace (1960), A Fever in the Blood (1961), Five Weeks in a Balloon (1962), The List of Adrian Messenger (1963) and The Caretakers (1963). He guest starred on episodes of Hong Kong, Michael Shayne, Zane Grey Theater, and 77 Sunset Strip. "They don't seem to make my kind of pictures any more," he said in 1964.

His last performance was in the film The Third Day (1965).

== Personal life ==
Marshall, a soft-spoken man who was one of the pillars of the Hollywood British community, was widely respected and well-liked due to his talent and professionalism, pleasant and easygoing demeanor, sensitivity, gentlemanly and courteous manner, witty sense of humour, and his "very great personal charm". Among the actor's many friends in the British community were Edmund Goulding, Eric Blore, Ronald Colman, Clive Brook, Merle Oberon, C. Aubrey Smith, David Niven, Basil Rathbone, Sir Cedric Hardwicke and Brian Aherne. Other friends included Raymond Massey, Rod La Rocque, Vilma Bánky, Kay Francis, Mary Astor, Irving Thalberg, Norma Shearer, Joan Crawford, Melvyn Douglas, Bette Davis and Grace Moore. Although popular and likeable, Marshall suffered from bouts of depression through much of his life. In his free time, he especially enjoyed sketching and fishing.

"His first charm is that he is a thoroughly nice, reasonable Englishman. He has a peculiarly easy, unaffected manner. He is tallish and dresses with exceptional taste and discretion. Also he gives an impression of hidden reserves, a sort of enticing withdrawal...And manners. The man has every charming trick of engaging manners known to masculinity".

— Reporter Alma Whitaker describing Marshall in The Los Angeles Times, 1932

=== Marriages and family ===
Marshall was married five times and divorced three. In 1914, he appeared with Mollie Maitland (whose real name was Hilda Lloyd Bosley) in The Headmaster; the following year, they were married. Five years later, he first appeared with Edna Best, who became his most frequent stage co-star; they also made three films together (The Calendar, Michael and Mary and The Faithful Heart). Marshall and Best were married in November 1928, following their respective divorces (they had been cohabiting for the previous three years). In 1931, Best broke a lucrative contract with MGM and walked off the filming of The Phantom of Paris with John Gilbert in order to be with Marshall in New York, where he was performing in a play. In response to a press inquiry, he said: "I'm sorry if Hollywood is annoyed, but Edna and I happen to be in love with each other and we want to be together."

During a return trip to London in late November 1932, Marshall and a pregnant Best gave an interview in which they stated their intention to briefly return to Hollywood the following summer. They would bring a nanny to help look after their daughter. At some point, Best and young Sarah returned to London while Marshall received more film offers. They continued making trips to see each other. In late 1933, actress Phyllis Barry had tea with Marshall and Claudette Colbert after they returned from Hawaii, where they had been filming Four Frightened People. She remembered that Marshall "insisted on my talking all the time because he said I sounded just like his wife". By the time Marshall was filming Riptide in early 1934, he reportedly was drinking heavily due to his problems with Best and increased phantom pain. (Director Goulding and co-star Norma Shearer successfully convinced him to curb his consumption of alcohol.) Not long after, Goulding introduced him to Gloria Swanson.

In 1940, after a long separation from her husband and wanting to marry someone else, Best divorced Marshall on grounds of desertion (he lived in Hollywood, and she lived in Britain). She remarried almost immediately. Twenty days later, he married actress and model Elizabeth Roberta "Lee" Russell, a sister of film star Rosalind Russell. Two years prior to their marriage, Russell's recently divorced ex-husband, songwriter Eddy Brandt, initiated an alienation of affection suit for $250,000 against Marshall, whom he accused of stealing his wife. Brandt later told the press that he and the actor settled out of court for $10,000. Marshall publicly denied this claim. In 1947, Russell divorced him in Mexico. They parted on amiable terms. Instead of explaining the reasons for her divorce, she told the press at the time: "I will never say anything against Bart. He is one of the most charming people I have ever known."

He was married to his fourth wife, former Ziegfeld girl and actress Patricia "Boots" Mallory, from 1947 until her death in 1958. They were wed in August 1947, with Nigel Bruce acting as best man. After a 16-month illness, Mallory died of a throat ailment at age 45. Marshall was deeply troubled by her death and had to be hospitalised for pneumonia and pleurisy less than two months later. He married Dee Anne Kahmann, his final wife, on 25 April 1960 when he was almost 70 years old. She was a twice-divorced, 38-year-old department store buyer. They remained married until his death.

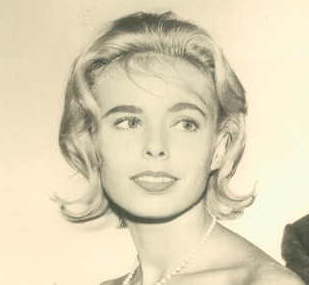
Daughter Sarah Marshall in 1961

Marshall had a daughter Sarah by Edna Best and another daughter Ann by Lee Russell. Sarah Marshall followed her parents and grandparents into the acting profession, appearing in many of the most popular television shows of the 1960s, including Star Trek, The Twilight Zone, Perry Mason, F Troop and Daniel Boone. Herbert and Sarah Marshall acted together in a television version of J.B. Priestley's play An Inspector Calls in 1951. His younger daughter, Ann Marshall (often called Annie), worked for many years as Jack Nicholson's personal assistant. He also had at least four step-children, two from his marriage to Best and two from his marriage to Mallory. His grandson Timothy M. Bourne, Sarah Marshall's only child, is an independent film producer. Bourne was the executive producer of the Academy Award-winning film The Blind Side (2009).

=== Affair with Gloria Swanson ===
In the early 1930s, Marshall was commonly rumoured within Hollywood social circles to have had affairs with both his Trouble in Paradise co-stars Kay Francis and Miriam Hopkins. In January 1934, Marshall, while still married to Best, began a serious affair with actress Gloria Swanson, who recounted their relationship in her memoirs, Swanson on Swanson (1980). She described Marshall at the time of their first meeting as "a handsome man in his early forties with a gentle face and soft brown eyes", who had "one of the most perfect musical voices I had ever heard". Swanson also wrote that the actor was "sweet beyond belief" and "a nice man", who "utterly charmed" her and her children. He constantly wrote her love notes, and when she was out of town, he sent her romantic telegrams almost hourly. (Many of these personal documents now reside at the University of Texas at Austin's Harry Ransom Center archives, as part of the Gloria Swanson Papers.) Newspapers and film fan magazines widely discussed his affair with Swanson at the time, which he made little attempt to keep secret.

In November 1936, Swanson left him once she accepted that he would not divorce Edna Best to marry her. Although insisting they were "madly in love," she believed that he would not demand a divorce because of his typically docile nature, reluctance to deliberately hurt people, and guilt over his separation from his young daughter. "He would always turn to alcohol rather than face a painful scene," she remembered. Despite an emotional parting, near the end of her life Swanson, who was married six times, wrote: "I was never so convincingly and thoroughly loved as I was by Herbert Marshall."

A few months into their relationship, Marshall became a subject of media gossip after a confrontation at El Morocco in New York City. A photographer snapped pictures of the couple dining together. When Marshall saw that Swanson was annoyed by the photographer, he "went into one of the most spectacular rages of all times," according to Modern Screen. In a syndicated column, Ed Sullivan wrote that he watched Marshall "rise violently" from his seat and chase the cameraman down the aisles between the nightclub's tables.

Around two months after this incident, Marshall again received substantial publicity after screenwriter John Monk Saunders (husband of actress Fay Wray) punched him in the face and knocked him to the floor at a dinner party given by director Ernst Lubitsch. According to a wire report, Marshall took exception to something Saunders said about Gloria Swanson. Later that night, after Marshall called Saunders a derogatory name, Saunders hit him while he was, in his own words, "seated...and looking in an opposite direction". Wray later added details unreported at the time. According to her, Marshall referred to Saunders as a "bestial bastard" after the screenwriter ogled Swanson's décolletage. Articles about the incident commonly mentioned Marshall's prosthetic leg, which had only very rarely been talked about in the press up to that point.

== Later years ==
With the increasing public demand for grittier films after the Second World War, the remaining members of the Hollywood British "colony" began to part ways, with some returning to Britain while others stayed in Hollywood. Marshall, like many of his contemporaries who stayed in Hollywood, began to receive far fewer acting offers and, especially toward the end of his life, had to take whatever he could get due to financial reasons. In May 1951, while in the hospital recuperating from corrective surgery, he suffered a "pulmonary embolism around his heart". After NBC aired three episodes of The Man Called 'X' that were previously transcribed, Marshall's friends Van Heflin, John Lund and Joseph Cotten filled in (one episode each) until Marshall's return in June 1951. Marshall appeared in his last significant film role in The Caretakers (1963) with Joan Crawford, who was happy to act with him again 22 years after they made When Ladies Meet together. Noting his poor health and heavy drinking, she worked with the film's director to minimise the time Marshall had to be on the set.

== Death ==
In late 1965, after his final brief film appearance in the thriller The Third Day, Marshall was admitted to the Motion Picture Relief Fund Hospital for severe depression. Eight days after his release, he died on 22 January 1966 in Beverly Hills, California of heart failure at the age of 75.

He was interred at Chapel of the Pines Crematory in Los Angeles.

== Filmography ==
Year	Title	Role	Notes
1927	Mumsie	Colonel Armytage	Lost film
1929	The Letter	Geoffrey Hammond	
1930	Murder!	John Menier	
1931	Secrets of a Secretary	Lord Danforth	
1931	The Calendar	Gerry Anson	Released as Bachelor's Folly in US
1931	Michael and Mary	Michael Rowe	
1932	The Faithful Heart	Waverly Ango	Released as Faithful Hearts in US
1932	Blonde Venus	Edward 'Ned' Faraday	
1932	Trouble in Paradise	Gaston Monescu	
1932	Evenings for Sale	Count Franz von Degenthal	
1933	I Was a Spy	Stephan	
1933	The Solitaire Man	Oliver Lane	
1934	Four Frightened People	Arnold Ainger	
1934	Riptide	Lord Rexford	
1934	Outcast Lady	Napier	
1934	The Painted Veil	Dr. Walter Fane	
1935	The Good Fairy	Dr. Max Sporum	
1935	The Flame Within	Doctor Gordon Philips	
1935	Accent on Youth	Steven Gaye	
1935	The Dark Angel	Gerald Shannon	
1935	If You Could Only Cook	Jim Buchanan	
1936	The Lady Consents	Dr. Michael J. Talbot	
1936	Till We Meet Again	Alan Barclay	
1936	Forgotten Faces	Harry Ashton	
1936	Girls' Dormitory	Doctor Stephen Dominik	
1936	A Woman Rebels	Thomas Lane	
1936	Make Way for a Lady	Christopher 'Chris' Drew	
1937	Angel	Sir Frederick Barker	
1937	Breakfast for Two	Jonathan Blair	
1938	Mad About Music	Richard Todd / Mr Harkinson	
1938	Woman Against Woman	Stephen Holland	
1938	Always Goodbye	Jim Howard	
1938	Zaza	Dufresne	
1940	A Bill of Divorcement	Gray Meredith	
1940	Foreign Correspondent	Stephen Fisher	
1940	The Letter	Robert Crosbie	
1941	Adventure in Washington	John Coleridge	
1941	The Little Foxes	Horace Giddens	
1941	When Ladies Meet	Rogers Woodruff	
1941	Kathleen	John Davis	
1942	The Moon and Sixpence	Geoffrey Wolfe	
1943	Forever and a Day	Curate in Air Raid Shelter	
1943	Flight for Freedom	Paul Turner	
1943	Young Ideas	Michael Kingsley	
1944	Andy Hardy's Blonde Trouble	Doctor M.J. Standish	
1944	The Shining Future	Himself	Short, Uncredited
1945	The Enchanted Cottage	Major John Hillgrove	
1945	The Unseen	Doctor Charles Evans	
1946	Crack-Up	Traybin	
1946	The Razor's Edge	W. Somerset Maugham	
1946	Duel in the Sun	Scott Chavez	
1946	Monuments of the Past	Narrator	Documentary
1947	Ivy	Miles Rushworth	
1947	High Wall	Wilard I. Whitcombe	
1949	The Secret Garden	Archibald Craven	
1950	The Underworld Story	E. J. Stanton	
1950	Black Jack	Doctor James Curtis	Released as Captain Blackjack
1951	Anne of the Indies	Doctor Jameson	
1953	Angel Face	Mr. Charles Tremayne	
1954	Riders to the Stars	Doctor Don Stanton	
1954	Gog	Doctor Van Ness	
1954	The Black Shield of Falworth	William, Earl of Mackworth	
1955	The Virgin Queen	Robert Dudley	
1956	Wicked as They Come	Stephen Collins	
1956	The Weapon	Inspector Mackenzie	
1957	Alfred Hitchcock Presents	Judge Connors	Season 2 Episode 19: "A Bottle of Wine"
1958	Alfred Hitchcock Presents	Colin Bragner	Season 3 Episode 39: "Little White Frock"
1958	Stage Struck	Robert Harley Hedges	
1958	The Fly	Inspector Charas	
1960	College Confidential	Professor Henry Addison	
1960	Midnight Lace	Charles Manning	
1961	A Fever in the Blood	Governor Oliver P. Thornwall	
1962	Five Weeks in a Balloon	The Prime Minister	
1963	The List of Adrian Messenger	Sir Wilfrid Lucas	
1963	The Caretakers	Doctor Jubal Harrington	
1964	The Presidency: A Splendid Misery	George Washington	TV documentary
1965	The Third Day	Austin Parsons	

== Radio credits ==
Year	Programme	Episode/source
1940	Forecast*	The Lodger
1941	The Jell-O Program	2 February episode; substitutes for Jack Benny as master of ceremonies
1946	Hollywood Star Time	Intermezzo
1946	Hollywood Star Time	Bedelia
1951	The Jell-O Program	16 February episode; at surprise birthday party for Jack Benny
1953	Suspense	The Mystery of Edwin Drood
1953	Suspense	The Dead Alive

- Audition program for the Suspense radio program.
