= Gertrude Michael =

American actress (1911–1964)

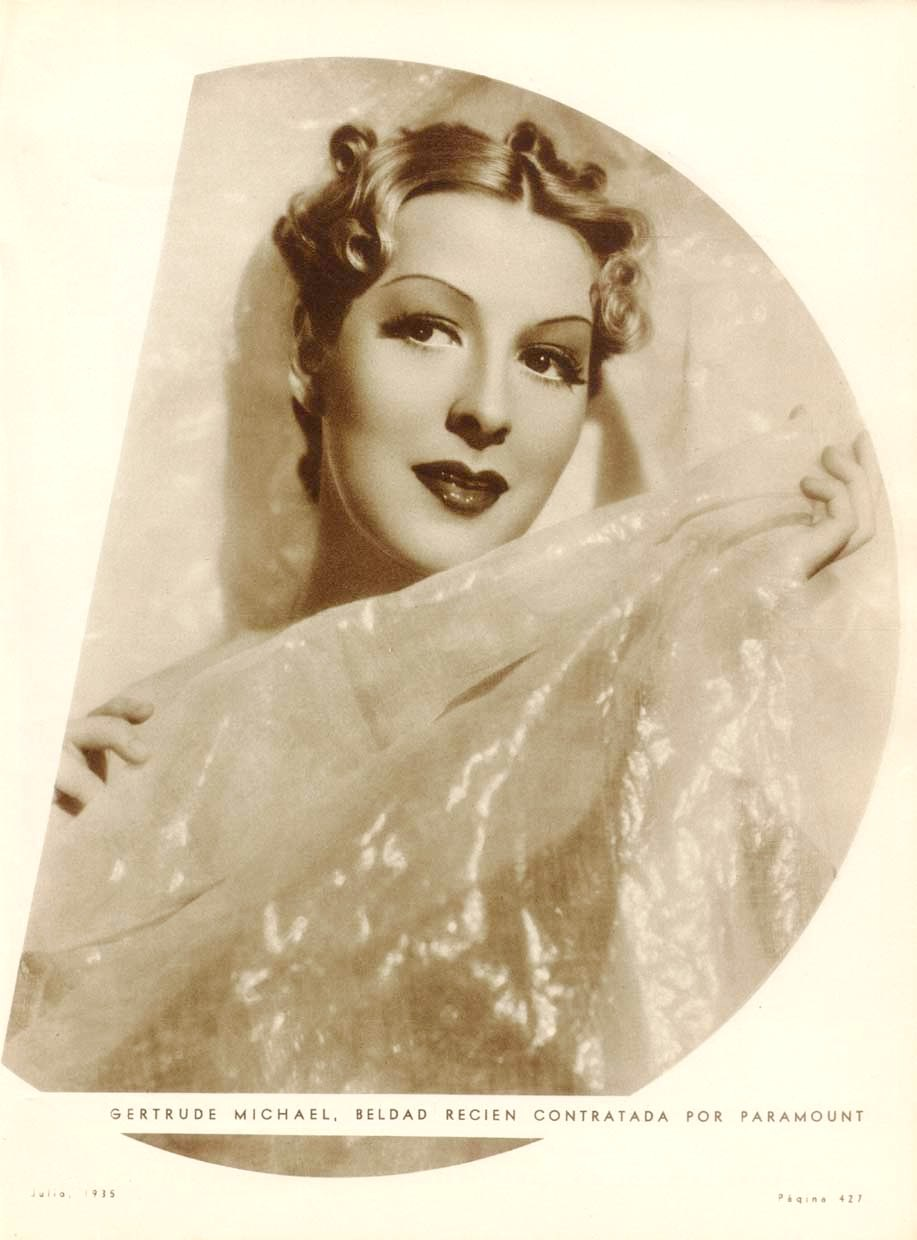
- Gertrude Michael in July 1935
- Born: Lillian Gertrude Michael; June 1, 1911; Talladega, Alabama, U.S.
- Died: December 31, 1964 (aged 53); Hollywood, California, U.S.
- Other name: Beck Michael
- Occupation: actress
- Years active: 1932–1961

Lillian Gertrude Michael (June 1, 1911 – December 31, 1964), sometimes nicknamed Beck Michael, was an American film, stage, and television actress.

== Biography ==
Lillian Gertrude Michael was born in Talladega, Alabama, to Mr. and Mrs. Carl H. Michael. She graduated from Talladega High school at the age of 14. In her youth, she played piano and organ, and she began Little Theatres in two communities. She became a singer on the radio.

Michael attended the University of Alabama, where she studied law, and Converse College in Spartanburg, South Carolina, pursuing a study of music. Then, she went to the Cincinnati Conservatory of Music to continue studying music. Her work there earned her a scholarship for studying five years in Italy. In 1929 in Cincinnati, she made her stage debut in the Stuart Walker stock theater company. She appeared on Broadway in Rachel Crothers' Caught Wet (1931). She entered the movies playing Richard Arlen's fiancée in Wayward (1932), but her best-remembered role is probably either as Rita Ross in Murder at the Vanities (1934), one of the last pre-Code films, in which she sang an ode to marijuana ("Sweet Marijuana"), or as Alicia Hatton, the snooty society girl in the Mae West comedy I'm No Angel (1933). In 1937, Michael returned to the stage at the Cape Play House in Dennis, Massachusetts, with the lead in Damn Deborah. Among her television appearances, Michael was seen on Fireside Theater 11 times from 1950 to 1955 and three times on Schlitz Playhouse. She also made a guest appearance on Perry Mason in 1958 as Helen Rucker in "The Case of the Sun Bather's Diary".

== Personal life ==
Michael had an affair with writer Paul Cain (a.k.a. Peter Ruric). After the relationship ended, Cain, in his novel Fast One, based the character of the alcoholic lover on Michael.

Michael died on December 31, 1964, aged 53, in her Hollywood home.

== Filmography ==
=== Film ===
- Wayward (1932) - Mary Morton
- Unashamed (1932) - Marjorie
- Sailor Be Good (1933) - Kay Whitney
- A Bedtime Story (1933) - Louise
- Night of Terror (1933) - Sarah Rinehart
- Ann Vickers (1933) - Mona Dolphin
- I'm No Angel (1933) - Alicia Hatton
- Cradle Song (1933) - Sister Marcella
- Search for Beauty (1934) - Jean Strange
- Bolero (1934) - Lady D'Argon
- George White's Scandals (1934) - Miss Lee
- Hold That Girl (1934) - Dorothy Lamont
- I Believed in You (1934) - Pamela Banks
- The Witching Hour (1934) - Margaret Price
- Murder at the Vanities (1934) - Rita Ross
- Murder on the Blackboard (1934) - Jane Davis
- The Notorious Sophie Lang (1934) - Sophie Lang
- Cleopatra (1934) - Calpurnia
- Menace (1934) - Helen Chalmers
- Father Brown, Detective (1934) - Evelyn Fischer
- It Happened in New York (1935) - Vania Nardi
- Four Hours to Kill! (1935) - Mrs. Sylvia Temple
- The Last Outpost (1935) - Rosemary
- Woman Trap (1936) - Barbara 'Buff' Andrews
- Till We Meet Again (1936) - Elsa Duranyi
- Forgotten Faces (1936) - Cleo Ashton
- The Return of Sophie Lang (1936) - Sophie Lang aka Ethel Thomas
- Second Wife (1936) - Virginia Howard
- Make Way for a Lady (1936) - Miss Eleanor Emerson
- Mr. Dodd Takes the Air (1937) - Jessica Stafford
- Sophie Lang Goes West (1937) - Sophie Lang
- Just like a Woman (1938) - Ann Heston
- Star of the Circus (1938) - Yester
- Hidden Power (1939) - Virginia Garfield
- Parole Fixer (1940) - Collette Menthe
- The Farmer's Daughter (1940) - Clarice Sheldon
- I Can't Give You Anything But Love, Baby (1940) - Magda Delys
- Slightly Tempted (1940) - Duchess
- Prisoner of Japan (1942) - Toni Chase
- Behind Prison Walls (1943) - Elinor Cantwell
- Women in Bondage (1943) - District Director Schneider
- Faces in the Fog (1944) - Nora Brooks
- Three's a Crowd (1945) - Sophie Whipple
- Allotment Wives (1945) - Gladys Smith
- Club Havana (1945) - Hetty - Powder Room Attendant
- That Wonderful Urge (1948) - Mrs. Whitson (uncredited)
- Flamingo Road (1949) - Millie
- Caged (1950) - Georgia Harrison
- Darling, How Could You! (1951) - Mrs. Rossiter
- Bugles in the Afternoon (1952) - May
- No Escape (1953) - Olga Valerie Lewis
- Women's Prison (1955) - Chief Matron Sturgess
- The Continental Twist (1961) - Letitia Clunker
- The Outsider (1961) - Clubwoman (uncredited) (final film role)

=== Television ===
- Schlitz Playhouse of Stars (3 episodes, 1952–1957) - the Duchess
- Crown Theatre with Gloria Swanson (1 episode, 1954) - Lisa Jenssen
- Cavalcade of America (1 episode, 1953) - Major Pauline Cushman
- Meet Corliss Archer (1 episode, 1954) - Mrs. Wilson
- The Pepsi-Cola Playhouse (1 episode, 1954) - Coralee
- Private Secretary (1 episode, 1954) - Hollywood Star
- The Ford Television Theatre (1 episode, 1954) - Belle
- Four Star Playhouse (1 episode, 1955) - Fanny
- Cameo Theatre (1 episode, 1955)
- The New Adventures of Charlie Chan (1 episode, 1957) - Joyce Fenton
- The 20th Century-Fox Hour (1 episode, 1957) - Kate
- Perry Mason (1 episode, 1958) - Helen Rucker
- Sea Hunt (1 episode, 1961) - Mrs. Friedrich
