= Trouble in Paradise (1932 film) =

1932 film by Ernst Lubitsch

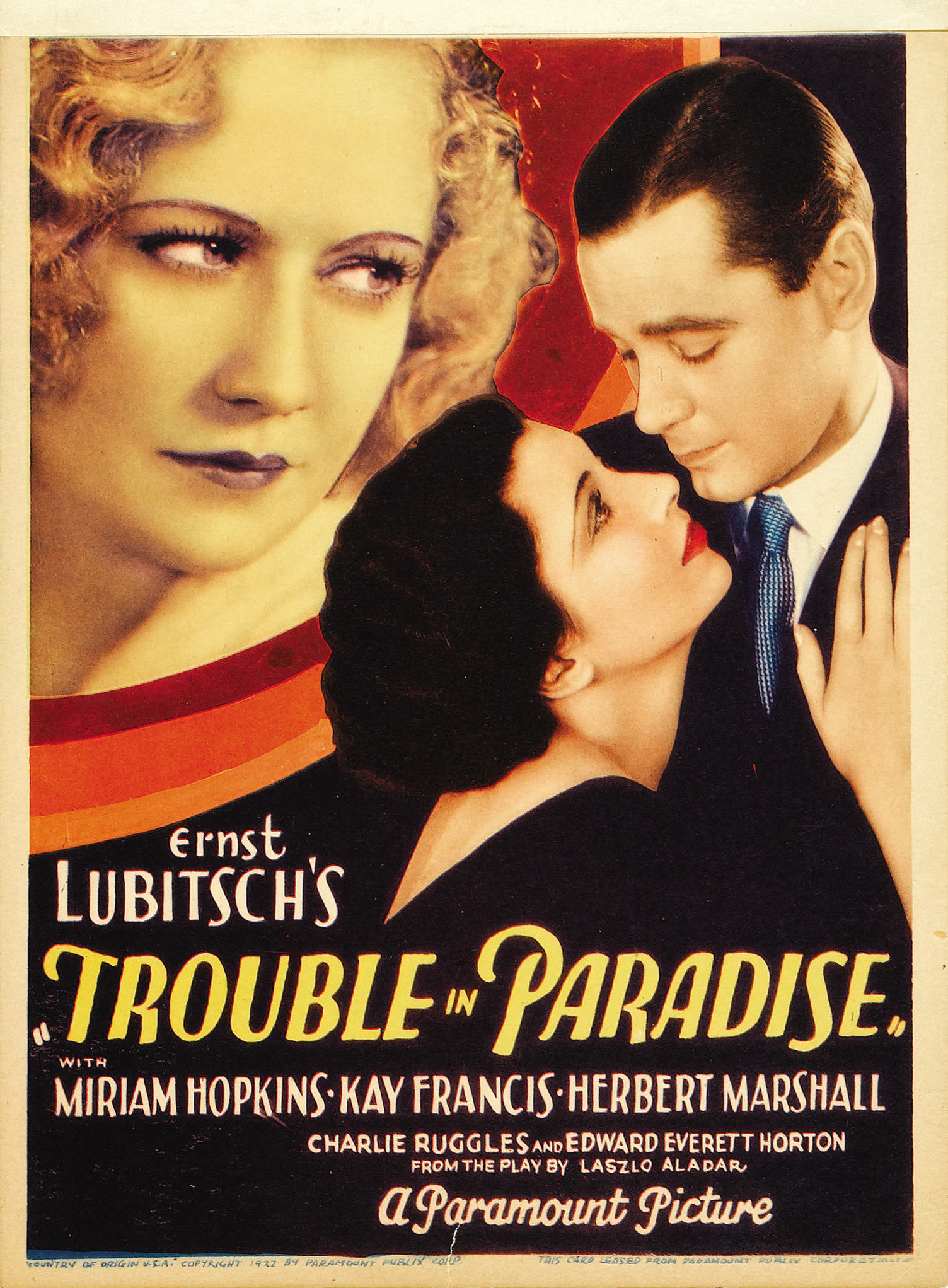
- Theatrical release poster
- Directed by: Ernst Lubitsch
- Screenplay by: Samson Raphaelson
- Adaptation by: Grover Jones
- Based on: A Becsületes Megtaláló (1931 play) by Aladár László
- Produced by: Ernst Lubitsch
- Starring: Miriam Hopkins; Kay Francis; Herbert Marshall; Charlie Ruggles; Edward Everett Horton
- Cinematography: Victor Milner
- Music by: W. Franke Harling
- Production company: Paramount Pictures
- Distributed by: Paramount Pictures
- Release date: October 30, 1932
- Running time: 83 minutes
- Country: United States
- Language: English
- Budget: $519,706
- Box office: $475,000 (US and Canada)

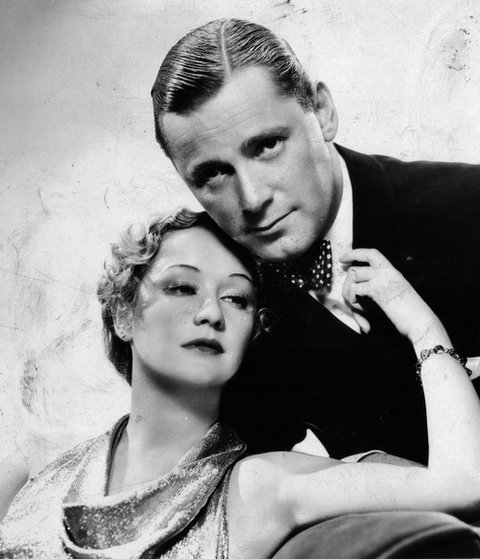
Miriam Hopkins and Herbert Marshall

Trouble in Paradise is a 1932 American pre-Code romantic comedy film produced and directed by Ernst Lubitsch and starring Miriam Hopkins, Kay Francis, and Herbert Marshall. Based on the 1931 play The Honest Finder (A Becsületes Megtaláló) by Hungarian playwright Aladár László, the lead characters are a gentleman thief and a lady pickpocket who join forces to con a beautiful woman who is the owner of a perfume company. In 1991, Trouble in Paradise was selected for preservation by the United States National Film Registry by the Library of Congress as being "culturally, historically, or aesthetically significant".

== Plot ==
In Venice, Gaston Monescu, a notorious thief masquerading as a baron, meets Lily, a pickpocket posing as a countess. The two fall in love and decide to team up. Almost a year later, in Paris, Gaston steals a diamond-encrusted purse worth 125,000 francs from widow Madame Mariette Colet, owner of the famous perfume manufacturer Colet & Cie. When Mariette offers a large reward for its return, Gaston claims it under the alias Monsieur La Valle.

While claiming the reward, Gaston charms Mariette, and admits to being broke. Mariette hires him as her private secretary. He arranges for Lily to be employed in Mariette's office, and stands up to Mariette's board of directors, led by Monsieur Adolphe J. Giron, the chairman, who is openly suspicious of him. Having observed Mariette open her private safe (and memorized the combination), Gaston persuades her that she should keep a large sum there, including half of her next dividend installment. Mariette begins to flirt with Gaston, and he develops feelings for her.

Unfortunately for the thieves, Mariette has two suitors: the Major, and aristocrat François Filiba, who was robbed in Venice by Gaston (posing as a doctor). François spots Gaston at a garden party and, sure they have met before, asks him if he has ever been in Venice, which Gaston denies. Fearing imminent discovery, Gaston and Lily decide to flee that night with what is in the safe, and not wait for the dividend installment. Mariette is invited to a dinner party thrown by the Major. She cannot decide whether to go or to spend the night in bed with Gaston. She eventually goes, but not before Lily realizes that Gaston has fallen for her rival and wants to back out of the plan.

At the party, the Major tells François that he once mistook Gaston for a doctor, prompting François to recall the Venice incident. François tells Mariette that Gaston is the thief Monescu, but she refuses to believe it is true. Lily robs the safe after confronting her partner. Mariette returns home and suggestively probes Gaston, who tells her that Monsieur Giron has embezzled millions from the company over the years. He then admits to being Monescu and to cleaning out the safe.

Lily confronts Mariette and Gaston, admitting that it was she who stole the money from the safe. She hands over the money but then retrieves it, saying it is the price Mariette must pay for Gaston, and leaves. Gaston goes after Lily, then returns to say goodbye to Mariette. He tells her that, as marvelous as their affair would be, it would end with a policeman coming to arrest them both. As he leaves, Gaston reveals that he took Mariette's pearl necklace, describing it as her gift to Lily, and she allows him to take it.

In the taxi, facing a chilly Lily, Gaston reaches for his present, only to realize she has lifted it from his pocket. Lily is at first triumphant, then realizes Gaston has lifted the money from her. This echoes their original meeting, when they first became partners in crime, and she embraces him in delight as the cab rolls away.

== Cast ==
- Miriam Hopkins as Lily
- Kay Francis as Madame Colet
- Herbert Marshall as Gaston Monescu
- Charlie Ruggles as the Major
- Edward Everett Horton as François Filiba
- C. Aubrey Smith as Adolphe J. Giron
- Robert Greig as Jacques, the butler

Luis Alberni, Marion Byron, Louise Carter, Gino Corrado, Leonid Kinskey, Fred Malatesta, Hector Sarno, Rolfe Sedan, and Nella Walker also appear in various uncredited roles.

== Production ==
Working titles for Trouble in Paradise included The Honest Finder, Thieves and Lovers, and The Golden Widow; the latter was publicly announced to be the intended release title. As with all the Lubitsch-Raphaelson collaborations, Lubitsch contributed to the writing and Raphaelson contributed ideas to the directing. Lubitsch did not receive screen credit for his writing, and Grover Jones, who was credited with the adaptation, did not contribute significantly: although he was in the room, his credit was based on a contractual obligation, and he did little more than tell stories. Further, although supposedly based on László Aladár's 1931 play The Honest Finder, Lubitsch suggested that Raphaelson not read the play, and instead the main character, Herbert Marshall's master thief, was based on the exploits of a real person, George Manolescu, a Romanian con man whose memoir was published in 1905, and became the basis for two silent films.

Made before effective enforcement of the Production Code, the film is an example of pre-Code cinema containing adult themes and sexual innuendo that was not permitted under the Code. In 1935, when the Production Code was being enforced, the film was not approved for reissue, and it was not seen again until 1968. Paramount was again rejected in 1943, when the studio wanted to make a musical version of the film.

The Art Deco sets for Trouble in Paradise were designed by the head of Paramount's art department, Hans Dreier, and the gowns were designed by Travis Banton.

== Reception ==
=== Critical response ===
Trouble in Paradise was notable for the film that first had people talking about "the Lubitsch touch", and it was, in fact, one of the director's favorites. Critic Dwight Macdonald said of the film that it was "as close to perfection as anything I have ever seen in the movies." The New York Times named the film as one of the ten best films of 1932. In 1998, Roger Ebert added it to his "Great Movies" collection. Wes Anderson and Ralph Fiennes both said the film was an inspiration for The Grand Budapest Hotel (2014).

On the review aggregator website Rotten Tomatoes, the film holds an approval rating of 90% based on 30 reviews, with an average rating of 9.1/10.

In the 2022 Sight and Sound critic's poll to determine the greatest films of all time, Trouble in Paradise was ranked at 136th place.

=== Accolades ===
Trouble in Paradise was named by the National Board of Review as one of the top 10 films of the year.

== Preservation ==
In 2017, Trouble in Paradise was preserved and restored by the UCLA Film & Television Archive and The Film Foundation from the 35 mm nitrate studio print and a 35 mm acetate dupe negative.
