= Edna Best =

British actress (1900–1974)

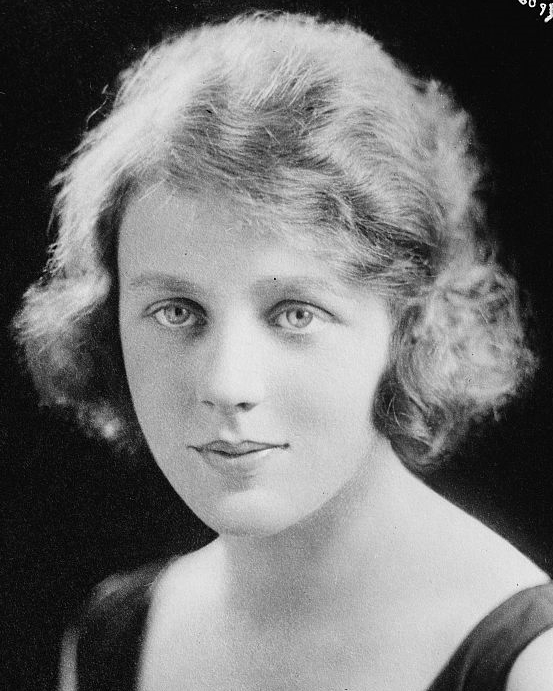
- Born: Edna Clara Best; 3 March 1900; Hove, Sussex, England
- Died: 18 September 1974 (aged 74); Geneva, Switzerland
- Education: Guildhall School of Music and Drama
- Occupation: Actress
- Years active: 1917–1959
- Known for: The Man Who Knew Too Much; Swiss Family Robinson; The Ghost and Mrs. Muir; Intermezzo: A Love Story
- Spouses: Seymour Beard (div. 1928) Herbert Marshall (m. 1928; div. 1940) Nat Wolff (m. 1940; died 1959)
- Children: 3; including Sarah Marshall

Edna Clara Best (3 March 1900 – 18 September 1974) was a British actress.

== Early life ==
Born in Hove, Sussex, England, she was educated in Brighton and later studied dramatic acting under Miss Kate Rorke who was the first professor of Drama at the Guildhall School of Music and Drama, London.

== Career ==
Best was known on the London stage before she entered films in 1921, having made her debut at the Grand Theatre, Southampton, in Charley's Aunt in 1917. She also won a silver swimming cup as the lady swimming champion of Sussex. She appeared with husband Herbert Marshall for her American debut in the 1925 Broadway play These Charming People by Michael Arlen, and later in John Van Druten's 1931 play There's Always Juliet on both Broadway and London.

For Gainsborough Pictures, she starred in the melodramas Michael and Mary and The Faithful Heart alongside her husband. She is best remembered for her role as the mother in the original 1934 film version of Alfred Hitchcock's The Man Who Knew Too Much. Her subsequent roles were a mixture of British and Hollywood productions. Her other film credits include Intermezzo: A Love Story (1939), Swiss Family Robinson (1940), The Late George Apley and The Ghost and Mrs. Muir (both 1947), and The Iron Curtain (1948).

Best received a nomination for an Emmy Award in 1957 for her role in the Ford Star Jubilee adaptation of This Happy Breed. She had appeared on television as early as 1938 in a live production of Love from a Stranger, adapted from the Agatha Christie short story "Philomel Cottage" by Frank Vosper.

== Personal life ==
Best was married three times and divorced twice.

Her first marriage to William Seymour Beard ended in divorce in 1928. The London Divorce Court gave Beard custody of the couple's twins (James and John Beard) in granting the divorce "owing to the misconduct of his wife, Miss Best, with Mr. Marshall." The Mr. Marshall was actor Herbert Marshall, whose divorce from Hilda Lloyd Marshall ("owing to the misconduct of her husband ... with ... Miss Edna Best") was granted in the same court session. Best later was married to Marshall from 28 November 1928 until 1940, and they had a daughter, actress Sarah Marshall. She married talent agent Nat Wolff on 7 February 1940 in Las Vegas. The judge "who granted the divorce [from Marshall] after a five-minute closed hearing, performed the marriage a few minutes later."

Best suffered a stroke in 1959.

== Recognition ==
In 1960, Best was inducted into the Hollywood Walk of Fame with a motion pictures star located at 6124 Hollywood Boulevard.

== Death ==
She died in Geneva, Switzerland in 1974 at age 74.

== Filmography ==
- Tilly of Bloomsbury (1921) as Tilly Welwyn
- A Couple of Down and Outs (1923) as Molly Roarke
- Sleeping Partners (1930) as She
- Loose Ends (1930) as Nina Grant
- Escape (1930) as Shingled Lady
- Beyond the Cities (1930) as Mary Hayes
- The Calendar (1931) as Jill Panniford
- Michael and Mary (1931) as Mary Rowe
- The Faithful Heart (1932) as Blackie Anderway / Blackie's Daughter
- The Key (1934) as Norah Kerr
- The Man Who Knew Too Much (1934) as Jill Lawrence
- South Riding (1938) as Sarah Burton
- Prison Without Bars (1938) as Yvonne Chanel
- Intermezzo (1939) as Margit Brandt
- Swiss Family Robinson (1940) as Elizabeth Robinson
- This Man Reuter (1940) as Ida Magnus
- The Late George Apley (1947) as Catherine Apley
- The Ghost and Mrs. Muir (1947) as Martha Huggins
- The Iron Curtain (1948) as Mrs. Albert Foster

== Radio appearances ==
Year	Programme	Episode/Source
1952	Theatre Guild on the Air	Love from a Stranger
1953	Theatre Guild on the Air	Jane
