= A Bill of Divorcement =

A Bill of Divorcement may refer to:

- A Bill of Divorcement (play), a 1921 play by Clemence Dane, on which the following films are based:
  - A Bill of Divorcement (1922 film)
  - A Bill of Divorcement (1932 film)
  - A Bill of Divorcement (1940 film)

== See also ==
- Divorce, the termination of a marriage or marital union
- Divorce Bill (disambiguation)
