= Allan Pollock =

English actor (1878-1942)

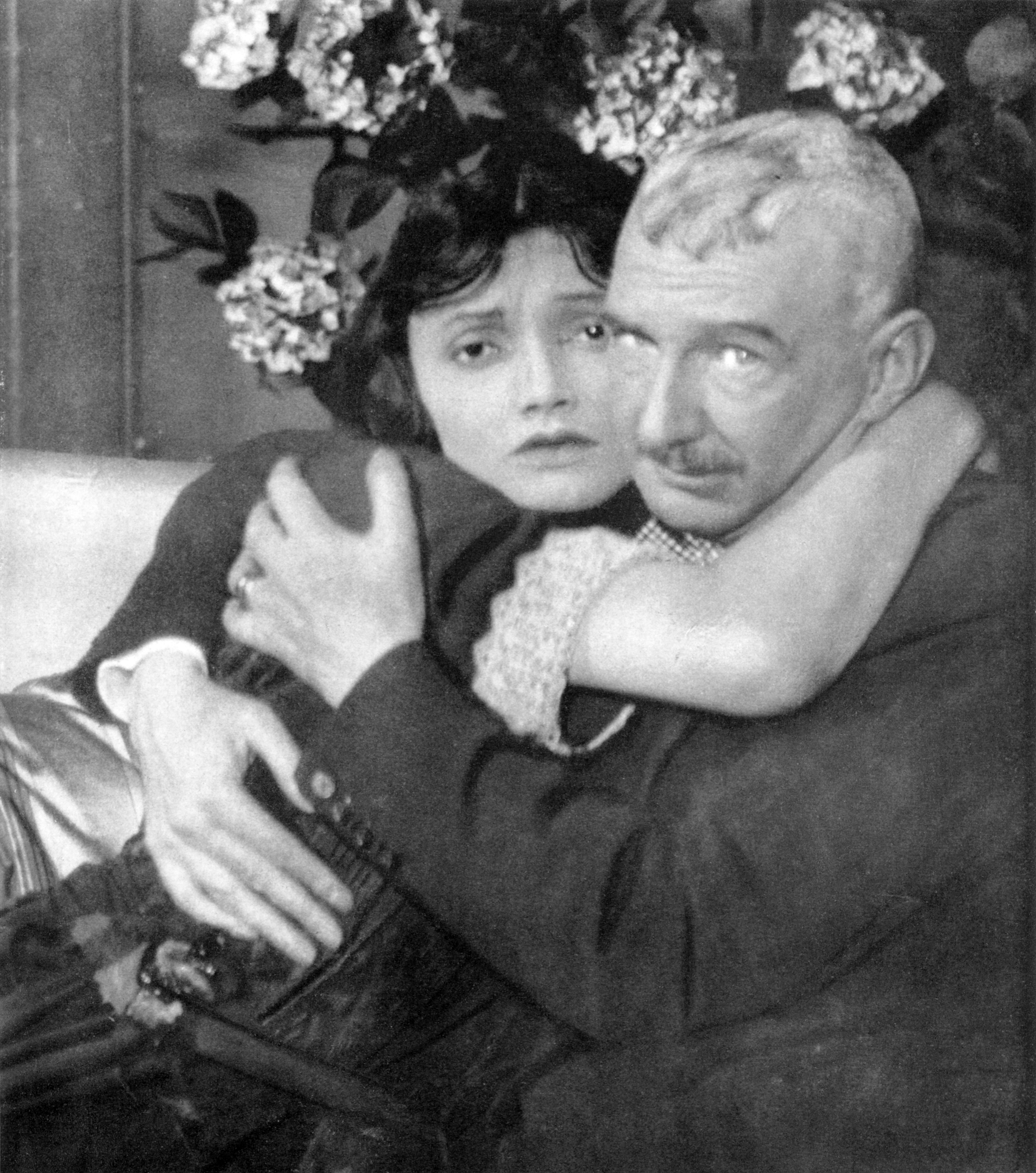
- Pollack and Katharine Cornell on Broadway in A Bill of Divorcement
- Born: c. 1878
- Died: 18 January 1942 (aged 63–64)
- Occupation: Actor
- Military career
- Allegiance: United Kingdom
- Branch: British Army
- Service years: 1914-18
- Rank: Captain
- Conflicts: World War I; Ypres Salient

Allan Pollock (c. 1878 – January 18, 1942) was an English actor. In the United States, he was known for stage appearances in Hawthorne of the U.S.A. (1912) and A Bill of Divorcement (1921). He joined the British armed forces in World War I in 1914, two days after war was declared, and rose to the rank of captain. In 1916 he was seriously wounded in the Ypres Salient and recovered in hospitals for more than three years and had eleven operations.
