= Divorce Bill =

Divorce Bill may refer to:

- An unsuccessful 1837 bill in the U.S. Congress which prefigured the Independent Treasury
- Local and personal Acts of Parliament (United Kingdom) or its predecessors, to grant a divorce
- Brexit divorce bill, a sum of money due to the European Union by the United Kingdom in connection with Brexit

== See also ==
- Divorce Act (disambiguation)
- A Bill of Divorcement (disambiguation)
