= The Wingless Victory =

1936 stage play

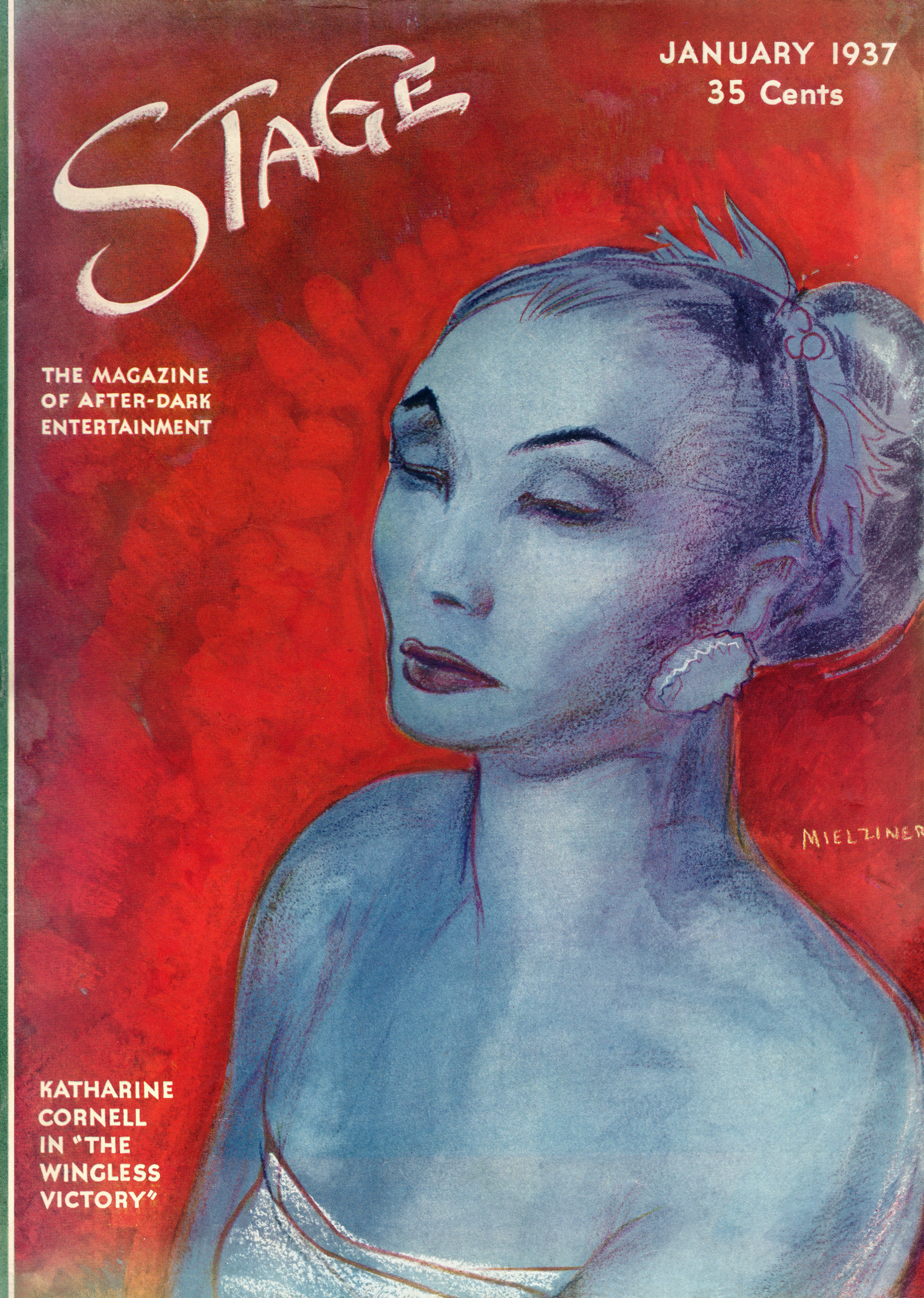
- Jo Mielziner's portrait of Katharine Cornell in The Wingless Victory on the cover of Stage magazine (January 1937)
- Original language: English
- Written by: Maxwell Anderson
- Genre: Tragedy
- Setting: Living room of a house in Salem, Massachusetts, cabin on the ship Wingless Victory

Premiere
- Date: December 23, 1936
- Place: Empire Theatre; New York City

The Wingless Victory is a 1936 three-act tragedy written by Maxwell Anderson, set in the year 1800. It was produced on Broadway by Katharine Cornell and staged by Guthrie McClintic, running for 110 performances from December 23, 1936, to March 1937 at the Empire Theatre. Jo Mielziner created the scenic and costume design.

== Cast ==
- Mary Michael as A Girl
- Kent Smith as Reverend Phineas McQueston
- Arthur Chatterton as Jared Mungo
- John Winthrop as Winston Urquhart and Harry
- Effie Shannon as Mrs. McQueston
- Myron McCormick as Ruel McQueston
- Lois Jameson as Venture
- Ruth Matteson as Faith Ingalls
- Barry Kelley as Happy Penny
- Theodora Pleadwell as Letty
- Walter Abel as Nathaniel McQueston
- Katharine Cornell as Oparre
- Helen Zelinskaya as Toala
- Claire Howard as Durian
- Victor Colton as Van Zandt
- Franklyn Davis as Longshoreman
