= A Bill of Divorcement (1932 film) =

1932 film

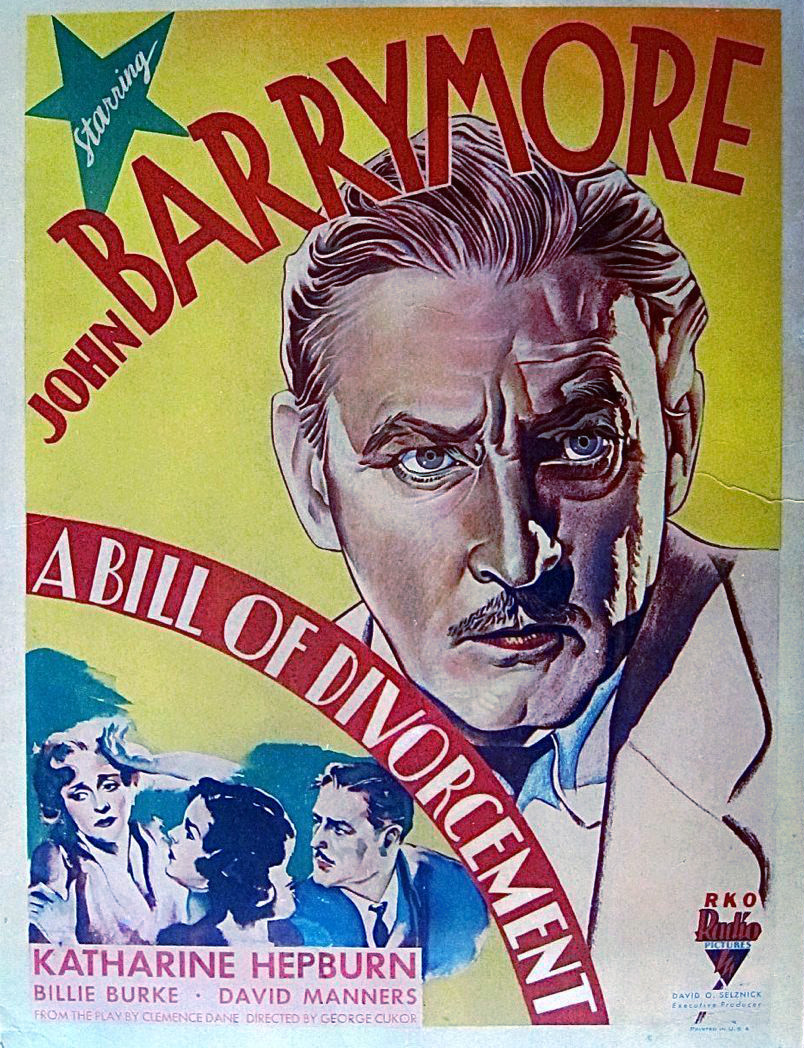
- Window card poster
- Directed by: George Cukor
- Written by: Howard Estabrook; Harry Wagstaff Gribble
- Based on: A Bill of Divorcement by Clemence Dane
- Produced by: David O. Selznick
- Starring: John Barrymore; Katharine Hepburn; Billie Burke; David Manners
- Cinematography: Sidney Hickox
- Edited by: Arthur Roberts
- Music by: Max Steiner
- Distributed by: RKO Radio Pictures
- Release date: September 30, 1932 (U.S.)
- Running time: 70 minutes
- Country: United States
- Language: English
- Budget: $250,000
- Box office: $531,000

A Bill of Divorcement is a 1932 American pre-Code drama film directed by George Cukor and starring John Barrymore and Katharine Hepburn in her film debut. It is based on the 1921 British play of the same name, written by Clemence Dane as a reaction to a law passed in Britain in the early 1920s that allowed insanity as grounds for a woman to divorce her husband. It was the second screen adaptation of the play; the first was a 1922 British silent film also titled A Bill of Divorcement. The film was made again in 1940 by RKO Pictures.

== Plot ==
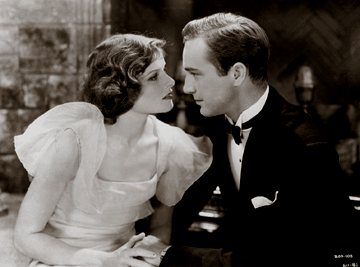
Katharine Hepburn and David Manners in A Bill of Divorcement

Middle-aged Englishwoman Margaret "Meg" Fairfield's family includes her 15-year-old daughter Sydney, Sydney's fiancé Kit Humphreys, fiancé Gray Meredith and ex-husband Hilary, who has been a patient in a mental institution for 15 years. Sydney seems to have inherited Hilary's psychiatric problems.

On Christmas Eve, Meg hosts a party in her English manor. Sydney happily discusses her future with Kit, as do Meg and Gray. When the group dedicate their performance of the song "God Bless the Master of This House" to Gray, Hilary's sister Hester objects because she considers Hilary to be the master of the house even though he is psychotic and institutionalized.

On Christmas morning, while Meg and Gray are at church, the asylum telephones to inform the family that Hilary has gone missing, and Hester unintentionally reveals to Sydney that insanity runs in the family. The family has blamed Hilary's troubles on shell shock from World War I, but another family member had similar problems in the past.

Hester and Sydney discuss Hilary's talent as a composer, and Sydney plays an unfinished sonata on the piano that Hilary had written before going to war. Hilary returns home after having escaped from the asylum. He chats with Sydney but they engage in a heated argument that shows their similarities as sensitive, free-spirited people.

When Meg returns from church, she is shocked to find Hilary. She has not loved him for years, is frightened by him and has been counting on her upcoming marriage to Gray, who helped her obtain a divorce based on Hilary's insanity. However, Hilary assumes that Meg will welcome him back. He cannot accept that the marriage has long since ended until his family doctor arrives and admonishes Hilary, telling him in Sydney's presence that his children should not have been born.

Sydney then begins contemplating her own plans with Kit. After the doctor tells her that her children would be at risk of inheriting Hilary's mental problems, she breaks her engagement to Kit and sends him away. Hilary vacillates between accepting Meg's love for Gray and pleading with her to change her mind. Meg succumbs to his pressure, but when he sees her talking with Gray, Hilary realizes how much she loves Gray and how miserable she feels.

Hilary finally regains his will to do what is best, and he has Sydney send Meg and Gray away. When Sydney returns to Hilary, she tearfully embraces him and they agree that they will live together. They sit together at the piano, cheerfully experimenting with new endings to his sonata, which she had been unable to finish by herself.

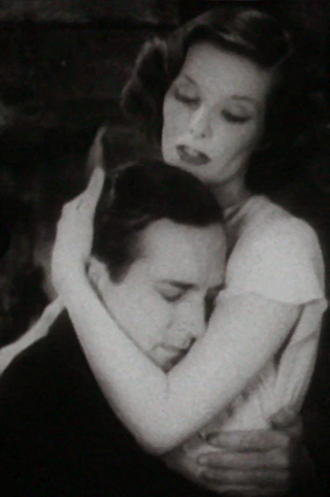
Katharine Hepburn and David Manners in A Bill of Divorcement

== Cast ==
- John Barrymore as Hilary Fairfield
- Billie Burke as Meg Fairfield
- David Manners as Kit Humphreys
- Katharine Hepburn as Sydney Fairfield
- Paul Cavanagh as Gray Meredith
- Henry Stephenson as Dr. Alliot
- Gayle Evers as Bassett
- Elizabeth Patterson as Aunt Hester Fairfield

== Production ==
The film was produced by David O. Selznick and George Cukor, who had disagreed about casting the 24-year-old Katharine Hepburn. Cukor was impressed with Hepburn's screen test, but Selznick did not like her appearance and was afraid that she would not be received well by audiences. However, Cukor cast Hepburn, beginning a lifelong professional and personal relationship with her. Hepburn was declared "a new star on the cinema horizon" by The Hollywood Reporter.

== Reception ==
In a contemporary review for The New York Times, critic Mordaunt Hall called A Bill of Divorcement "an intelligent, restrained and often stirring picture," praising Hepburn's performance as " exceptionally fine ... one of the finest seen on the screen."

According to RKO records, the film earned a profit of $110,000 during its first year of release after cinema circuits deducted their exhibition percentage of box-office ticket sales.

== Home media ==
Kino Lorber released the film on DVD and Blu-ray disc in July 2018.

== See also ==
- List of Christmas films
