= Katharine Cornell =

German-born American actress (1893–1974)

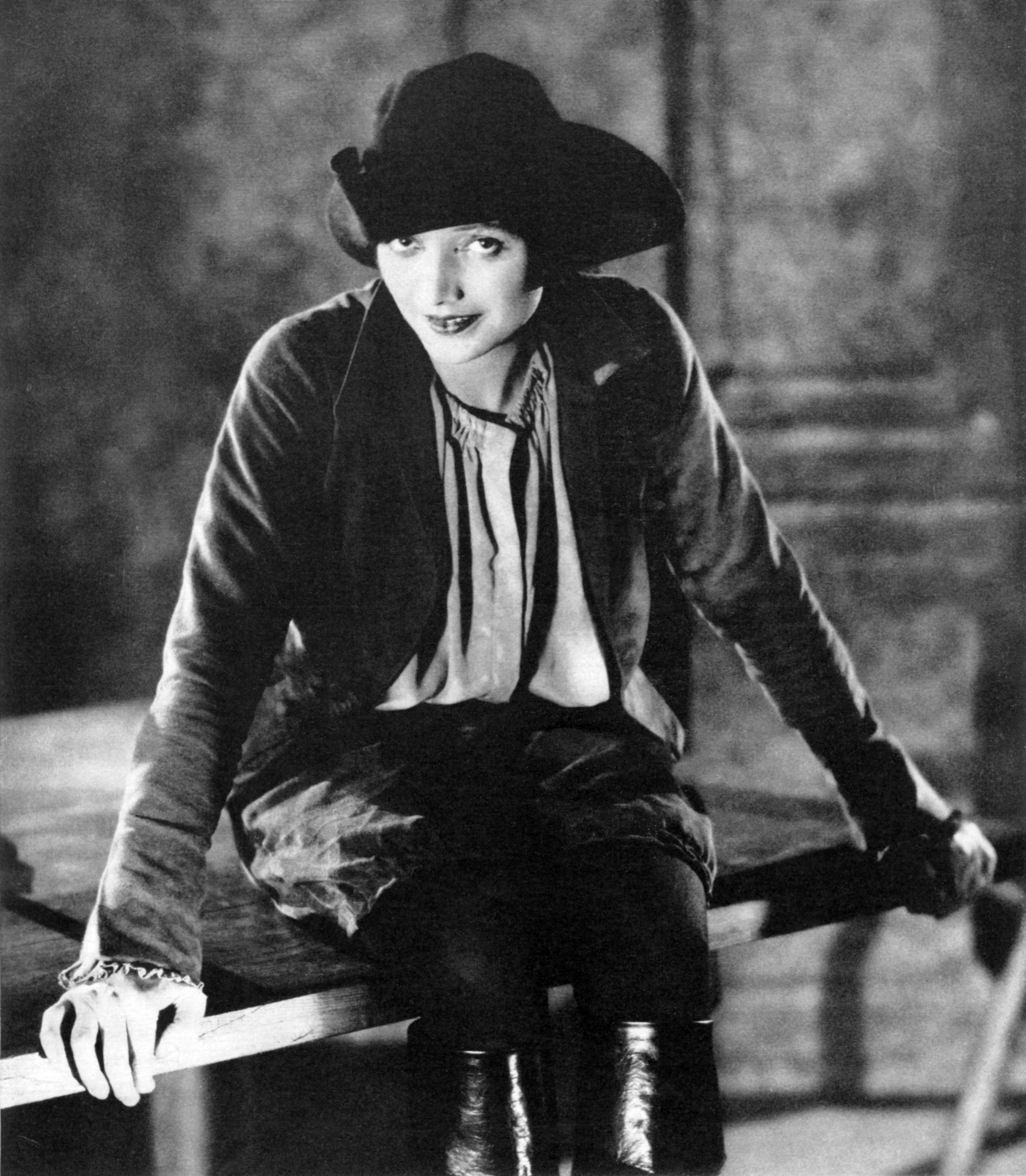
- Cornell as Mary Fitton in the Broadway production of Clemence Dane's Will Shakespeare (1923)
- Born: February 16, 1893; Berlin, German Empire
- Died: June 9, 1974 (aged 81); Tisbury, Massachusetts, U.S.
- Resting place: Tisbury Village Cemetery
- Occupations: Actress; writer; producer
- Years active: 1915–1960
- Spouse: Guthrie McClintic (m. 1921; died 1961)

Katharine Cornell (February 16, 1893 – June 9, 1974) was a German-born American stage actress, writer, theater owner and producer. She was born in Berlin to American parents and raised in Buffalo, New York.

Dubbed "The First Lady of the Theatre" by critic Alexander Woollcott, Cornell was the first performer to receive the Drama League Award, for Romeo and Juliet in 1935. Cornell is noted for her major Broadway roles in serious dramas, often directed by her husband, Guthrie McClintic. The couple formed C. & M.C. Productions, Inc., a company that gave them complete artistic freedom in choosing and producing plays. Their production company gave first or prominent Broadway roles to some of the more notable actors of the 20th century, including many British Shakespearean actors.

Cornell is regarded as one of the great actresses of the American theatre. Her most famous role was that of English poet Elizabeth Barrett Browning in the 1931 Broadway production of The Barretts of Wimpole Street. Other appearances on Broadway included in W. Somerset Maugham's The Letter (1927), Sidney Howard's The Alien Corn (1933), Juliet in Romeo and Juliet (1934), Maxwell Anderson's The Wingless Victory (1936), S. N. Behrman's No Time for Comedy (1939), a Tony Award-winning Cleopatra in Antony and Cleopatra (1947), and a revival of Maugham's The Constant Wife (1951).

Cornell was noted for spurning screen roles, unlike other actresses of her day. She appeared in only one Hollywood film, the World War II morale booster Stage Door Canteen, in which she played herself. She appeared in television adaptations of The Barretts of Wimpole Street and Robert E. Sherwood's There Shall Be No Night. She also narrated the documentary Helen Keller in Her Story, which won an Oscar.

Primarily regarded as a tragedienne, Cornell was admired for her refined, romantic presence. One reviewer wrote "Hers is not a robust romanticism, however. It tends toward dark but delicate tints, and the emotion she conveys most aptly is that of an aspiring girlishness which has always been subject to theatrical influences of a special sort." Her appearances in comedy were infrequent, and praised more widely for their warmth than their wit. When she played in The Constant Wife, critic Brooks Atkinson concluded that she had changed a "hard and metallic" comedy into a romantic drama.

Cornell died in Tisbury, Massachusetts at the age of 81, and her ashes are interred at Martha's Vineyard's Tisbury Village Cemetery.

== Family and childhood ==
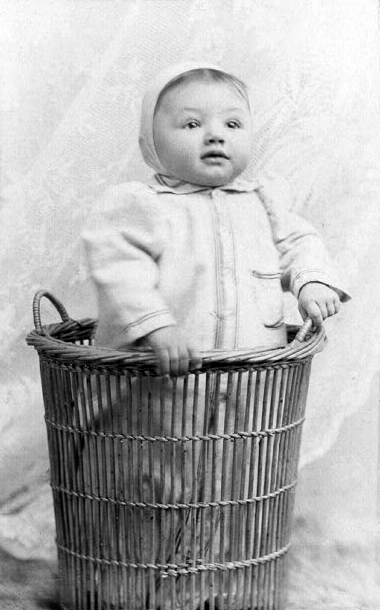
Katharine Cornell at age two

Cornell was born February 16, 1893, into a prominent, wealthy family distantly related to Ezra Cornell, founder of Cornell University. Her great-grandfather Samuel Garretson Cornell, a descendant of pioneer ancestor Thomas Cornell, came to Buffalo in the 1850s, and founded Cornell Lead Works. One of his grandsons, Peter, married Alice Gardner Plimpton. The young couple lived in Berlin when Peter was studying medicine at the University of Berlin. Their first child, Katharine, was born there. Six months later, the family returned to Buffalo, where they lived at 174 Mariner Street. As a child, Katharine had a troubled relationship with her parents due in part to her mother's alcoholism. She play-acted in her backyard with imaginary friends. Soon, she was performing in school pageants and plays, and she watched family productions in her grandfather's attic theater, still standing at 484 Delaware Avenue. Cornell played at the Buffalo Studio Club parlor theater, located at 508 Franklin Street. She loved athletics, and she was a runner-up for city championship at tennis as well as an amateur swimming champion. She attended the University of Buffalo (later the State University of New York at Buffalo).. In 1913, she joined The Garret Club, a woman's only private club in Buffalo, and participated in club theatricals.

After Cornell had become famous, she often brought her productions to her native Buffalo. Although she never returned to Buffalo to live, her enthusiasm for the city and its inhabitants was well known. Biographer Tad Mosel wrote: "To show her affection for her hometown, she always walked slowly when she left her hotel, turning her head to smile on everyone on the street, missing no one, so they could feel close to her and be able to say when they got home that night, 'Katharine Cornell smiled directly at me.'" For the rest of her career, on opening Broadway nights, she was greeted backstage by family and friends from Buffalo. Many of her productions were performed at the Erlanger Theater on Delaware Avenue, across from the Statler Hotel. The Erlanger was demolished in 2007.

== Early career ==
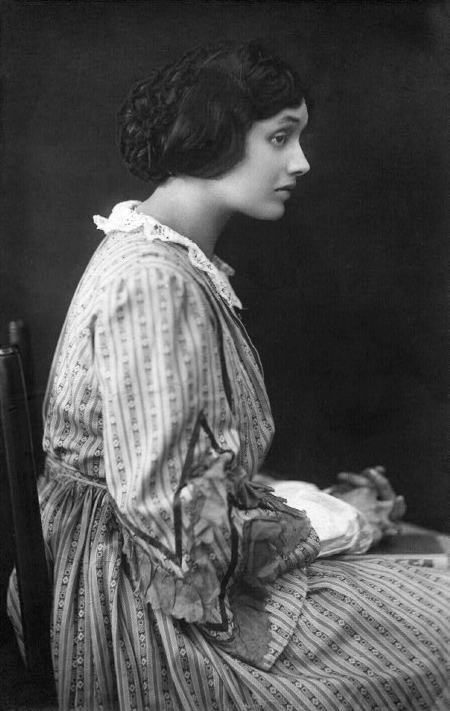
Cornell as Jo March in the 1919 London stage production of Little Women

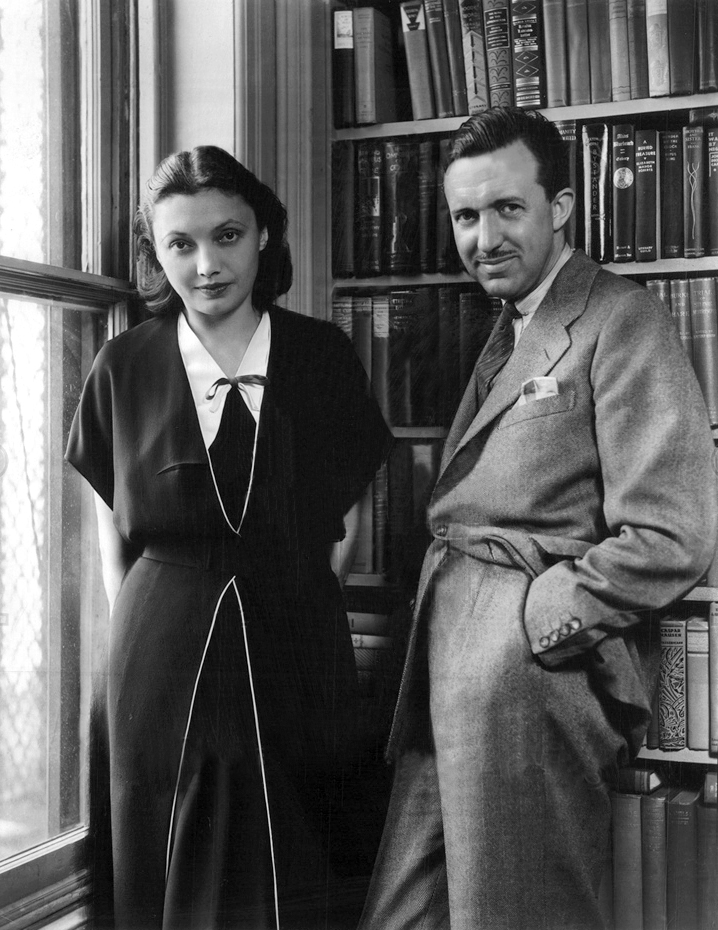
Cornell and Guthrie McClintic in the library of their home at 23 Beekman Place (1933)

In 1915, Cornell's mother died, leaving her enough money to be independent. The young woman moved to New York City to pursue her acting career. There she joined the Washington Square Players and was hailed as one of the most promising actresses of the season. After just two seasons, she joined Jessie Bonstelle's company, a leading New York repertory company that divided its summers between Detroit and Buffalo. Now aged 25, Cornell was consistently receiving glowing reviews. Cornell joined various theater companies, including the Bonstelle, that toured around the East Coast. In 1919, she went with the Bonstelle company to London to play Jo March in Buffalo play-wright Marian de Forest's stage adaptation of Louisa May Alcott's novel Little Women. Although the critics disparaged the play itself, they specifically noted Cornell as the one bright spot of the evening. The paper The Englishwomen wrote of Cornell: "London is unanimous in its praise, and London will flock to see her." Upon her return to New York, she met Guthrie McClintic, a young theater director. She made her Broadway debut in the play Nice People by Rachel Crothers, in a small part with Tallulah Bankhead.

Cornell's first major Broadway role was that of Sydney Fairfield in Clemence Dane's A Bill of Divorcement (1921). The New York Times wrote "[she] has the central and significant role of the play and...gives therein a performance of memorable understanding and beauty." It played for 173 performances, well enough to be considered a hit. Afterward, Cornell played in a succession of now-forgotten plays.

She married McClintic on September 8, 1921, in her aunt's summer home in Cobourg, Ontario. Cornell's family spent summers there among other wealthy Americans. The couple eventually bought a townhouse at 23 Beekman Place in Manhattan. It is generally acknowledged that Cornell was a lesbian and that McClintic was gay, and their union was a lavender marriage. She was a member of the "sewing circles" in New York, and had relationships with Nancy Hamilton, Tallulah Bankhead, Mercedes de Acosta, and others.

== Stardom ==
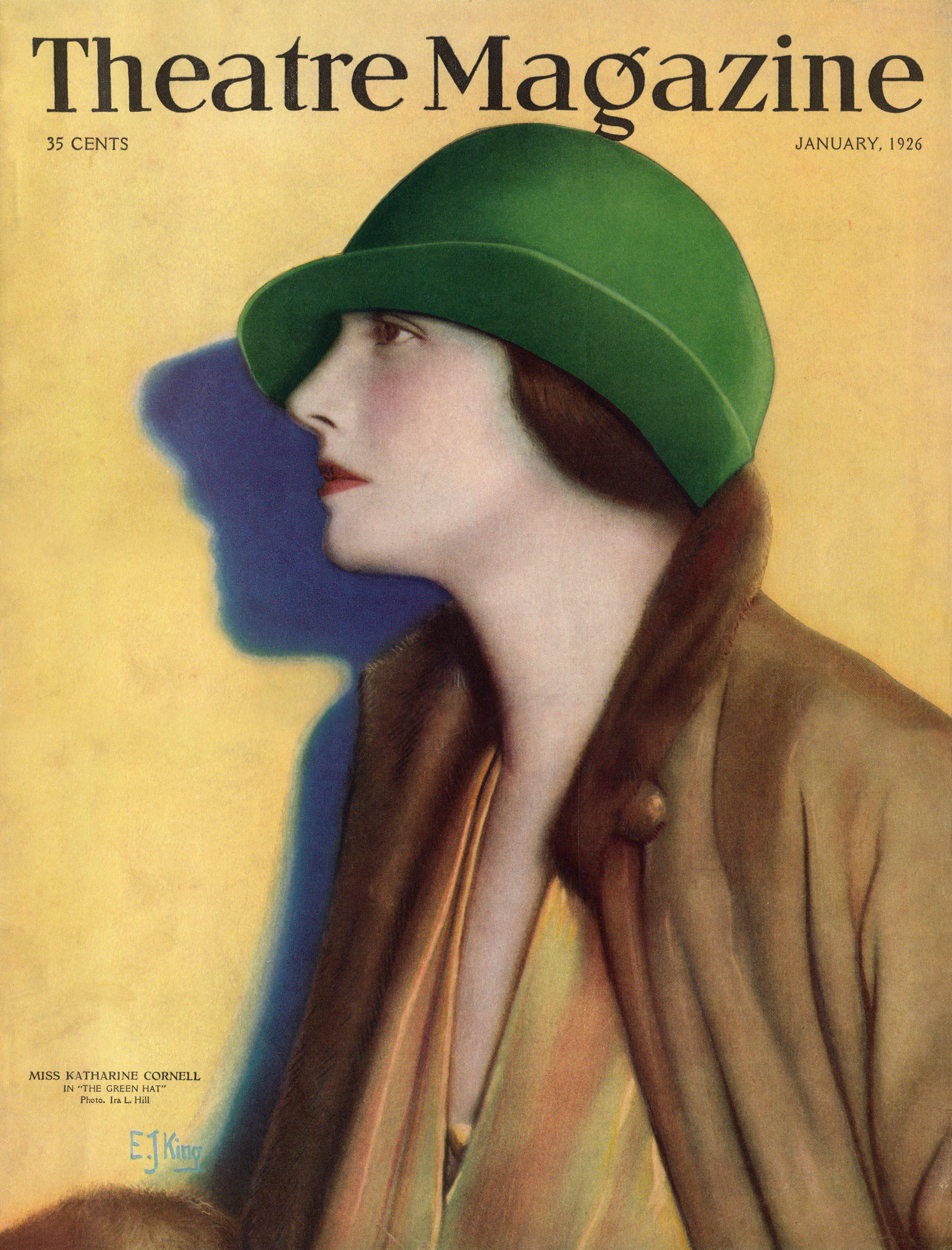
Cornell in The Green Hat (1925)

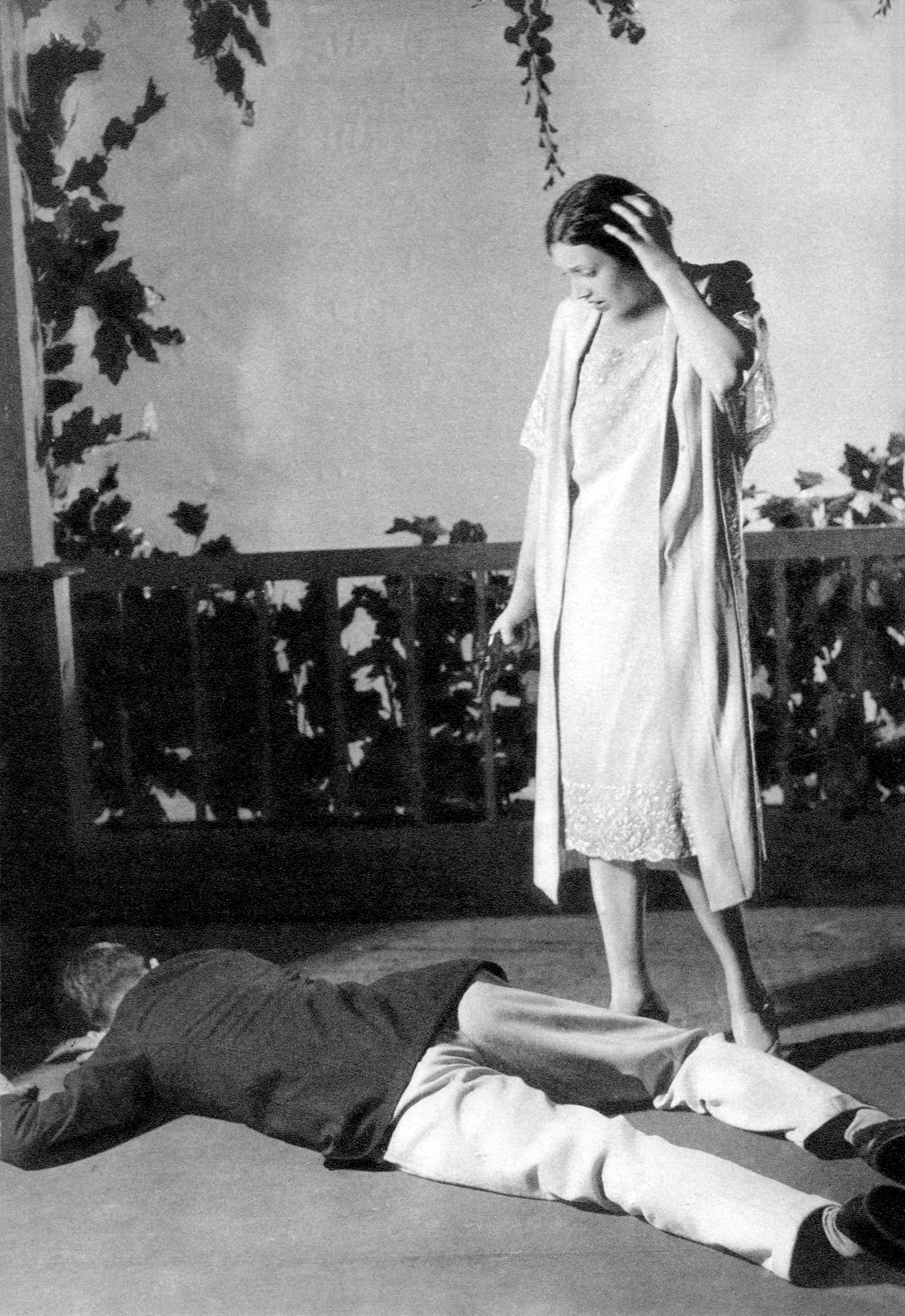
Cornell with Burton McEvilly in the Broadway production of The Letter (1927)

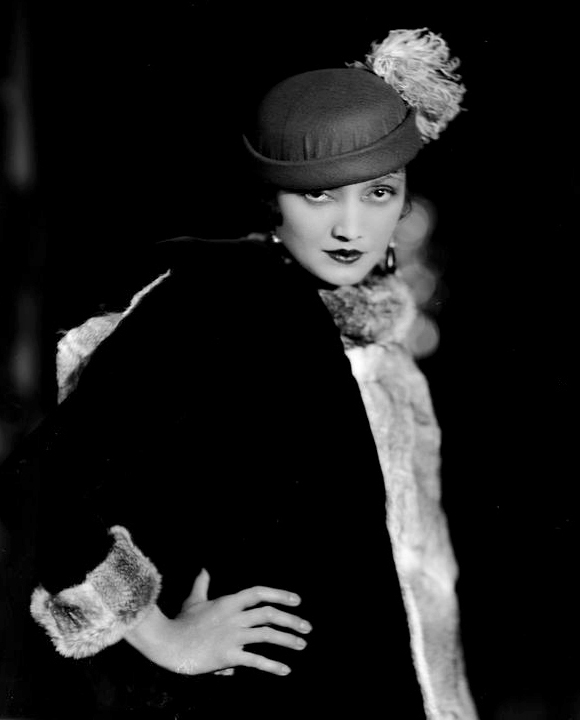
Cornell in the Broadway production of The Age of Innocence (1928)

In 1924, Cornell and McClintic were part of The Actor's Theatre, a successor to the Washington Square Players. This was a group of actors that sought to be a democracy without any stars. As their first production, they selected Candida by George Bernard Shaw. At the time, the play was considered perfect for the group, as none of the characters was considered to outshine the others, because Shaw intended the play to be about ideas. Although the leading protagonist is Candida, she does not really come into her own until the third act. But, Cornell essentially re-envisioned the play. She made Candida the core of the play, a view adopted by directors and critics ever since. Reviews were ecstatic and audiences responded in kind. The Actor's Theatre changed its plans and decided that Cornell's name must appear above the play's title in all future productions of the troupe. Another acting troupe, the Theatre Guild, controlled the rights to all Shaw's plays, and thereafter allowed only Cornell to play the role of Candida so long as she was alive, a role which she reprised several more times in her career. Shaw later wrote her a note stating that she had created "an ideal British Candida in my imagination."

Cornell's next role was to play Iris March in The Green Hat (1925), a romance by Michael Arlen. The play had themes of syphilis and loose morals, and Iris March was a strong sexual creature. Leslie Howard played the role of Napier. While the play was still in Chicago, it became an international hit, known all over the US and Europe. Ashton Stevens, senior drama critic in Chicago, wrote that The Green Hat "should die at every performance of its melodramatics, its rouge and rhinestones, its preposterous third act.... Already, I am beginning to forget its imperfections and remember only its charms." Its chief charm, he conceded, was Cornell, who sent "tiny bells up and down my unpurchasable vertebrae." Most other critics panned the play itself, but nonetheless found it irresistible because of Cornell's ability to mesmerise, despite the garish dialogue. Critic George Jean Nathan wrote that the play was "superbly acted in its leading role by that one young woman who stands head and shoulders above all the other young women of the American theater, Miss Katharine Cornell."

The Green Hat had 231 performances in New York before going to Boston and then a cross-country tour. The play's success spawned a fashion in green hats of the type worn by Cornell in the play. Later, Tallulah Bankhead played the role of Iris March in a less successful London production, and Greta Garbo played the role in a 1928 film adaptation, A Woman of Affairs.

She starred in 1927 in The Letter, by W. Somerset Maugham, as Leslie Crosbie, a woman who kills her lover. Maugham suggested Cornell for the part. Although the critics were not too excited about the play, Cornell by then had developed a loyal following. The opening night was such a sensation that the New York Sun wrote that the sidewalks were packed with people after the performance straining to catch a glimpse of her.

In 1928, Cornell played the lead role of the countess Ellen Olenska in a dramatized version of Edith Wharton's novel The Age of Innocence. Her performance received only positive reviews. After this success, Cornell was offered the lead in The Dishonored Lady. It was intended for Ethel Barrymore, who declined the role. The play is a lurid melodrama about true-life murder in Glasgow, Scotland. Walter Winchell wrote "Never in the history of the theatre has an actress of such distinction permitted such an exciting scene. She [Cornell] actually permits a man to crack her a powerful wallop in the face!" One critic complained about the "fifth rate claptrap" of a play and chastised Cornell for selecting such lowbrow theater as a waste of her talents.

Vogue wrote that Cornell does these types of plays because "she prefers...to be blunt, trash of a violent kind." Biographer and playwright Tad Mosel counters that although this is meant as a reproof, when stripped of its condescension,

it is a simple statement of the truth. There was a part of her that indeed preferred trash of a violent kind. Her integrity as an artist was the only defense such a preference needed. Every performance had to be as much a revelation of herself as it was an interpretation of a role, and therefore her choice of roles and the way she played them offer great insights into her nature, greater perhaps than can be inferred from her gracious, smiling, always agreeable, and increasingly guarded behavior offstage. One must look at her performances as one looks at the output of a writer or a painter.

== The Barretts of Wimpole Street ==
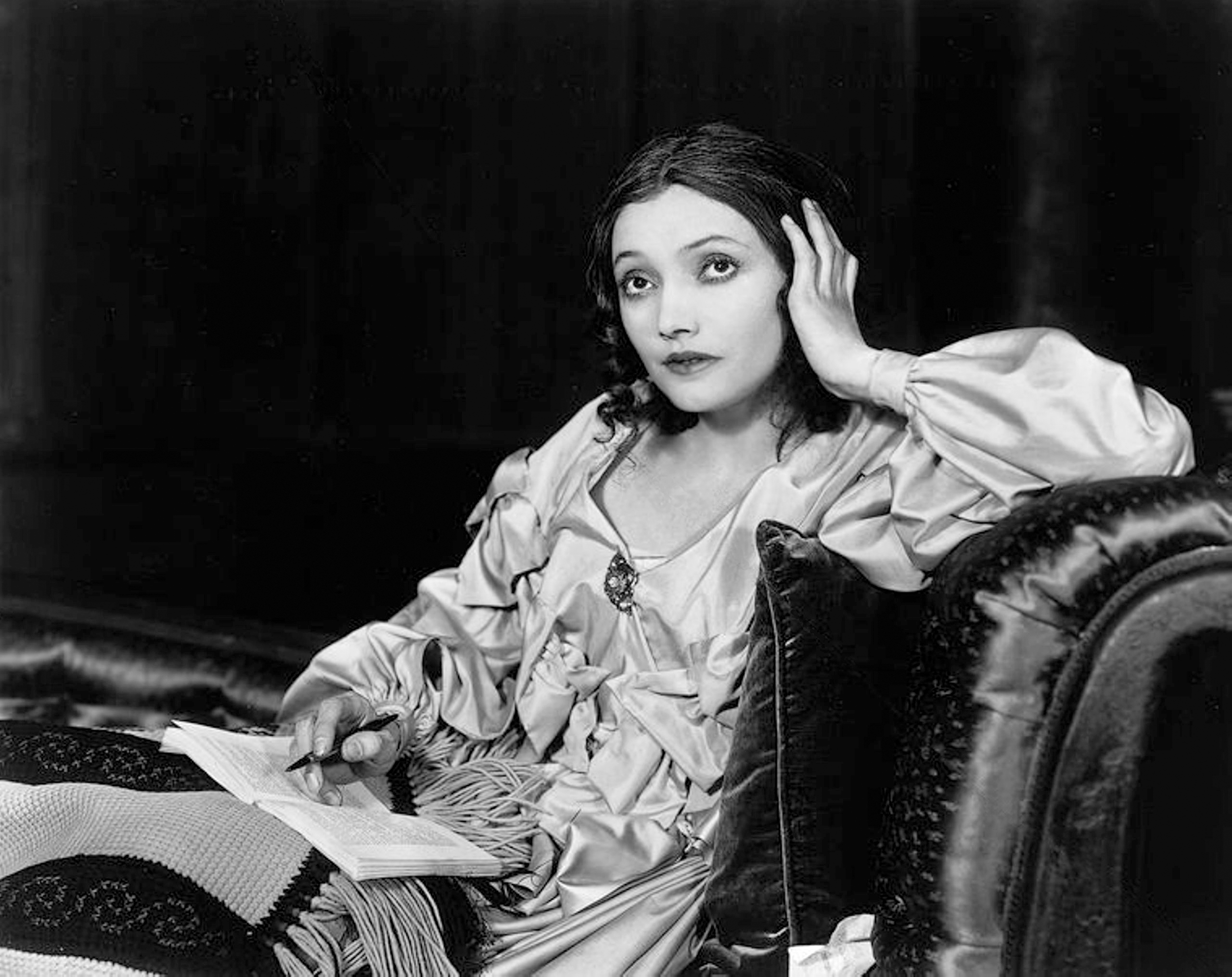
Cornell as Elizabeth Barrett in the original Broadway production of The Barretts of Wimpole Street (1931)

Katharine Cornell is perhaps best known in her role as poet Elizabeth Barrett Browning in Rudolf Besier's play The Barretts of Wimpole Street. The play is based on the life of the poet's family; the Barretts lived on Wimpole Street in London. The play opens with Elizabeth, the oldest child of a large and loving family. Their widowed father has become embittered and determined that none of his children should marry, lest they become slaves to the "brutal tyranny of passion" and "the lowest urge of the body". His smothering concern for his family—particularly for Elizabeth, who is an invalid—takes on a sinister character. Poet Robert Browning has read some of Elizabeth's poetry and comes to meet her, and they immediately are attracted to each other. When he leaves, Elizabeth struggles to her feet to watch him disappear down the lane. Elizabeth and Robert later elope, and when her father finds that she has married without his permission or knowledge, he orders that her beloved dog, Flush, be killed. He is then informed that Elizabeth has taken the dog with her.

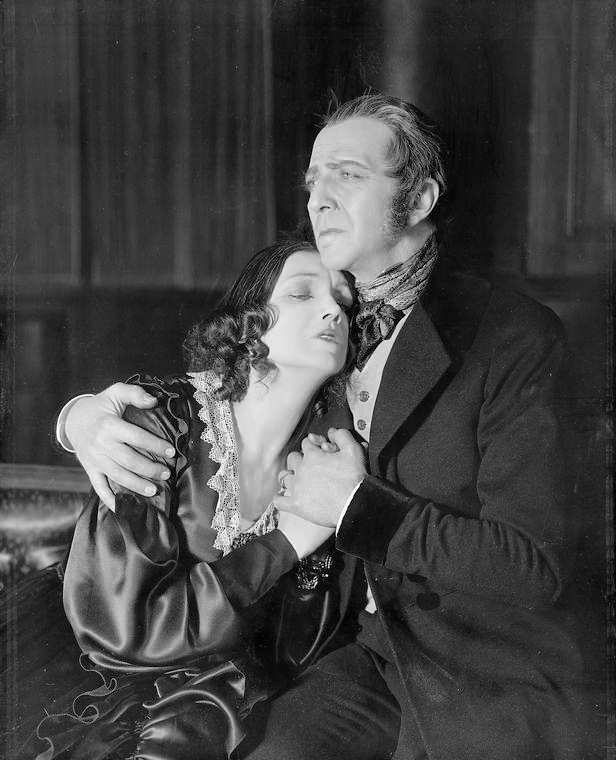
Cornell with Charles Waldron, who portrayed Elizabeth's uncompromising father in The Barretts of Wimpole Street (1931)

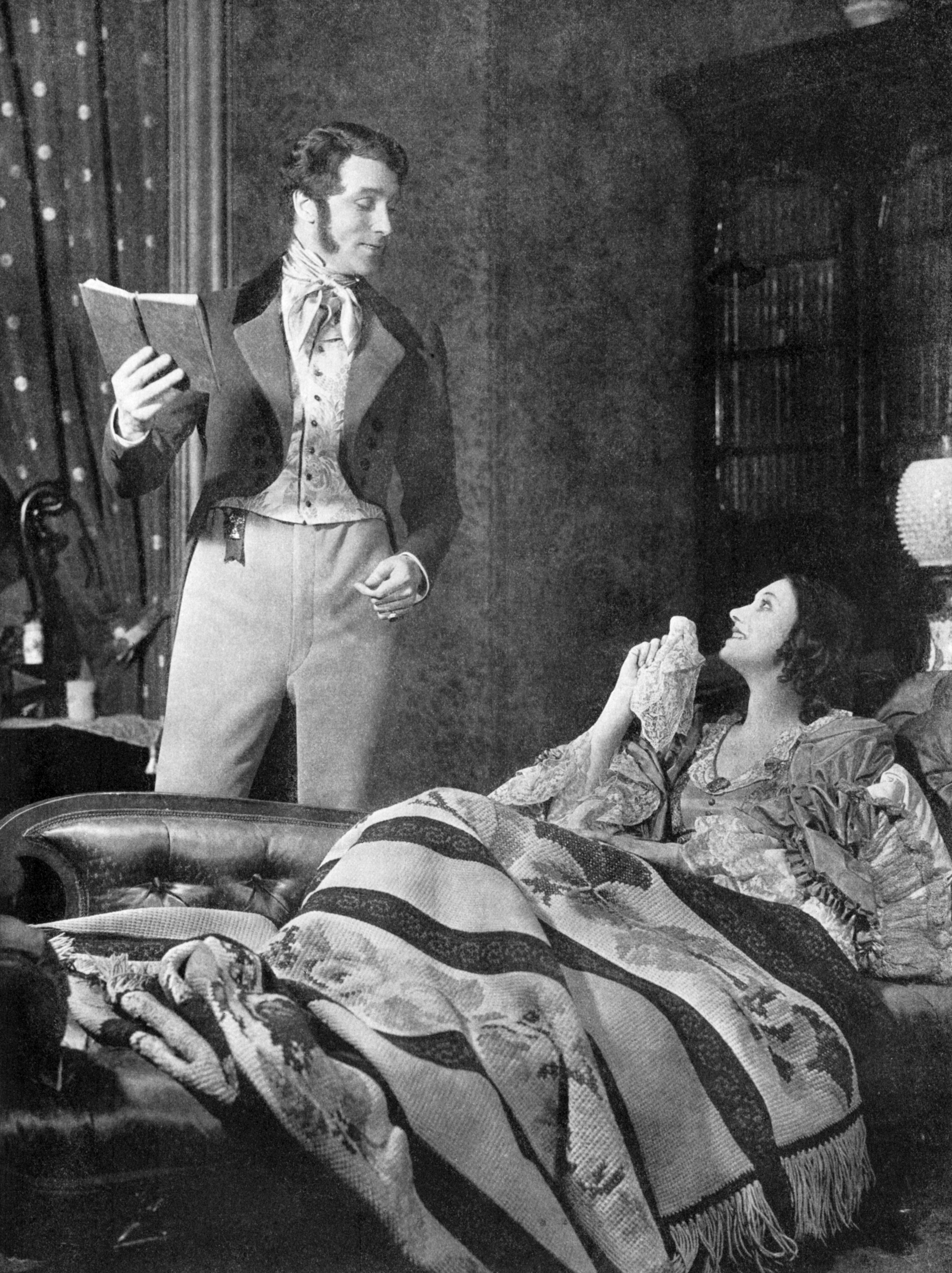
Brian Aherne and Cornell in The Barretts of Wimpole Street (1931)

The play has several difficulties. The lead role of Elizabeth has to be played initially as submissive to her father, yet as the center of attention throughout. Although the ending is happy for Elizabeth and Robert, the rest of the family remains under the domination of the father, who is deranged in his obsession. Elizabeth must be played for the first half lying still on a sofa wearing heavy Victorian costume, and covered with a blanket, befitting an invalid. Many, including Lionel Barrymore, who was asked to play the part of the father, thought it was too melodramatic and past its time. The play was turned down by 27 New York producers before McClintic read it and found it so moving, he cried whenever he read it.

When McClintic was in London, he was able to secure Brian Aherne to play the part of Robert Browning. Afterwards, McClintic immediately went to a London jewelry store and bought a necklace, two bracelets and a garnet ring, all at least 100 years old. For every single performance that Cornell gave as Elizabeth Barrett, she wore this jewelry in the last act, when she leaves the family home for the last time. Katharine Hepburn was selected for the part of Henrietta, but because she was going to play in a summer stock company a few months later, she could not be signed to a contract. Casting the dog was troublesome because it had to lie still in its basket on stage for a great length of time, and then exit when called. McClintic selected an eight-month-old cocker spaniel, which played the role for the full run and many others afterward, to tremendous applause.

Cornell bought The Barretts of Wimpole Street for McClintic in December 1930. The play was the first production of the Cornell-McClintic Corporation (C. & M. C. Productions, Inc.), formed January 5, 1931, with Cornell its producer-manager and McClintic its director. McClintic directed the three-hour play with a meticulous attention to period detail. The play opened first in Cleveland, then played in Buffalo before reaching New York in January 1931. Brooks Atkinson wrote of opening night:

After a long succession of meretricious plays it introduces us to Katharine Cornell as an actress of the first order. Here the disciplined fury that she has been squandering on catch-penny plays becomes the vibrant beauty of finely wrought character.... By the crescendo of her playing, by the wild sensitivity that lurks behind her ardent gestures and her piercing stares across the footlights she charges the drama with a meaning beyond the facts it records. Her acting is quite as remarkable for the carefulness of its design as for the fire of her presence.... The Barretts of Wimpole Street is a triumph for her and the splendid company with which she has surrounded herself.

All other critics were uniform in praise of her acting: using adjectives such as superb, eloquent, exalted, dark, rhythmic, luminous, haunting, lyric, ravishing. Dorothy Parker, known for her caustic wit and unsentimental reviews, wrote that although she did not think it a good play, she "paid it the tribute of tears...Miss Katharine Cornell is a completely lovely Elizabeth Barrett...It is little wonder that Miss Cornell is so worshipped; she has romance, or, if you like better the word of the daily-paper critics, she has glamour." The play ran for 370 performances. When it was announced that it was closing, the remaining performances sold out, and hundreds were turned away.

The play's success engendered a revival of Robert Browning's poetry, and cocker spaniels became the popular dog that year. Irving Thalberg wanted Cornell to play her part in an MGM adaptation, offering that if she was not completely satisfied with the result, the film would be destroyed. She refused. The movie that was released had most of the original cast, and Thalberg's wife, actress Norma Shearer, played the part of Elizabeth.

Cornell refused to act in movies because she had seen audiences laugh at the acting of old movies and did not want that to happen to her. According to biographer Tad Mosel,

"she did not feel that she was acting for historians or nostalgia fans of the future but for audiences of the here and now, people who came into the theatre tonight, sat in their seats and waited for the curtain to go up. Not only were they the ones she wanted to reach, but she wanted to be there when they responded, she did not want to be off in another part of the world while they gazed at a second-hand image on a screen. In fact, she was not sure she could give them anything to respond to without the inducement of their presence." Moreover, the largeness of her facial structure—her bone structure—were so explicit that they could be seen to the last row, but "might have been less than an asset on the screen where the camera enlarges and exaggerates. Her voice and gestures were eloquent theatre props that might have been too much for the screen, necessitating adjustments so basic that she could not make them. And beyond physical equipment...it is possible that the quality she had as an individual, the unique something about her that transcended technique and craft and fifth-rate writing might not have transcended cameras; it would not have come through to an audience without her physical presence."

But other sources say that Hollywood secured Broadway plays for its own actors under contract and that Cornell was never considered for the roles she originated on stage. Additionally, Cornell had apparently written to film director George Cukor, suggesting that she would consider a film if he would direct her. Nothing came of this effort.

She declined many movie roles that earned Academy Awards wins and nominations for the actresses who did play those parts, such as Olan in The Good Earth and Pilar in For Whom the Bell Tolls. Additionally, many of her roles in hit plays were successfully played by other great actresses, or were adapted as movies. As audiences were deserting live theater for the movies, Cornell became determined to stay in the theater in order to help keep it vibrant.

== 1933–1934 transcontinental repertory tour ==
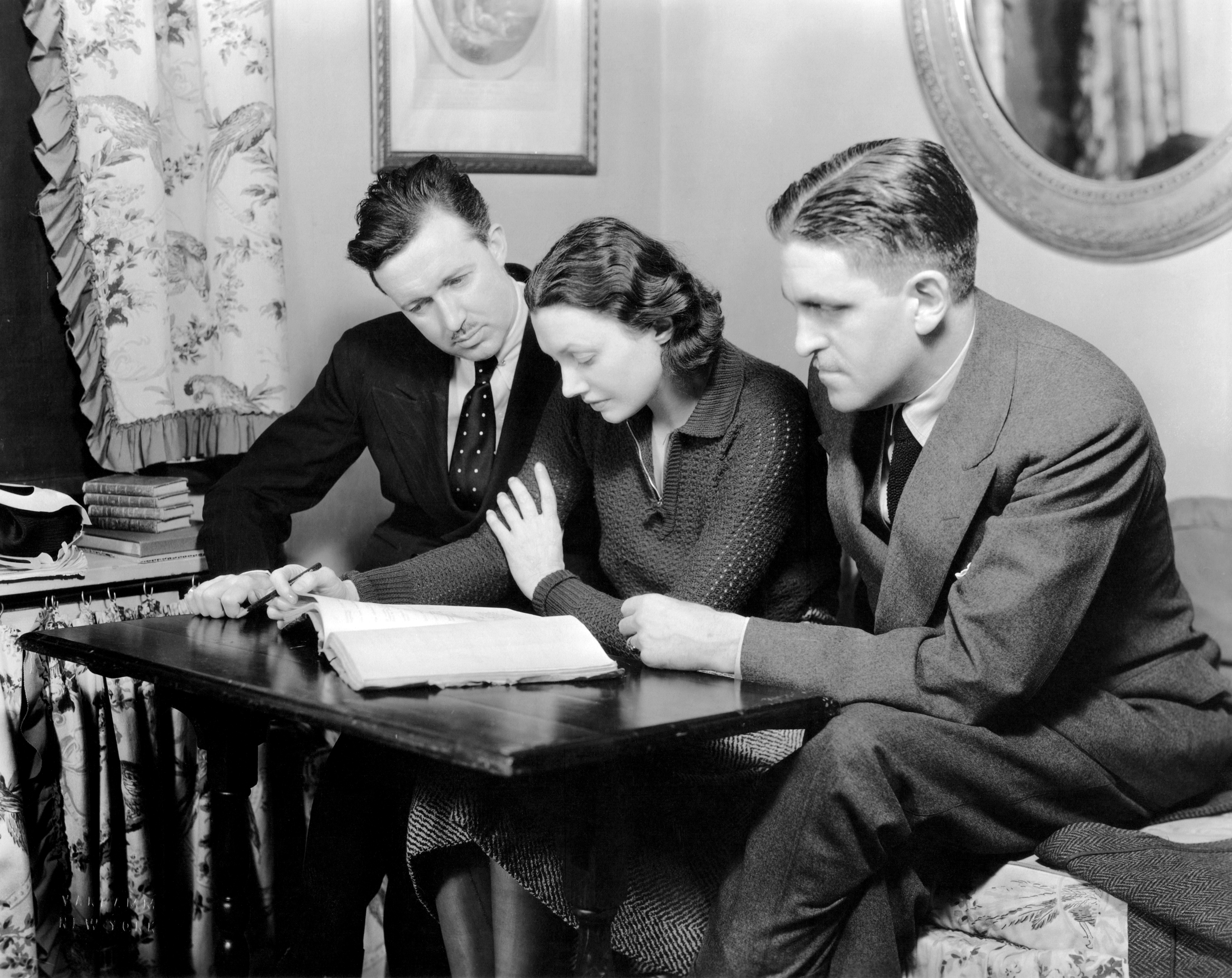
McClintic, Cornell and playwright Sidney Howard at the Belasco Theatre, preparing Cornell's production of Alien Corn (1933)

After Barretts closed, Cornell played leading parts in two plays: Lucrece (1932), Thornton Wilder's translation of the play by André Obey, and Sidney Howard's Alien Corn (1933). Her success in Lucrece put her on the cover of Time on December 26, 1932.

Cornell's next production was Romeo and Juliet, with McClintic directing. It was the first Shakespeare for them both. Romeo was performed by Basil Rathbone, who had played leading roles at the Shakespeare Memorial Theatre and the Royal Court Theatre in England. The production opened in Cornell's native Buffalo on November 29, 1933. Cornell described that day as "a nightmare from start to finish. The sets wouldn't fit, the balcony was impossible, my costumes were wrong, the lighting went haywire." Martha Graham, who choreographed the dance sequences, stepped in and fashioned a flowing robe for Juliet's balcony-scene costume shortly before curtain time.

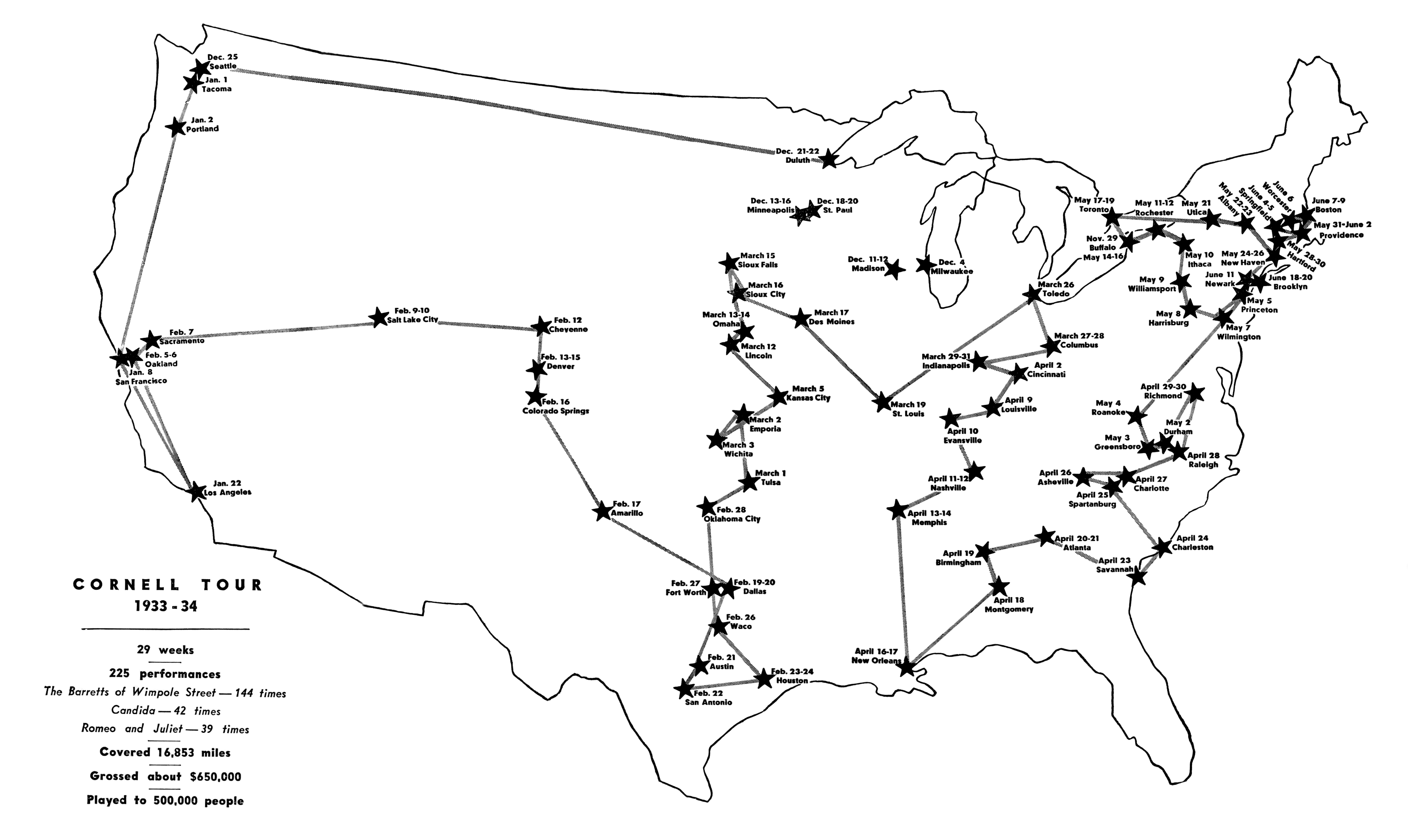
Map of Cornell's 1933–1934 transcontinental repertory tour

The production opened a seven-month transcontinental tour that rotated three plays: Romeo and Juliet, The Barretts of Wimpole Street, and Candida. Many theatre experts advised against such an ambitious endeavor, planned during the height of the Great Depression. It was the first time anyone had attempted a national tour with a legitimate Broadway show, let alone a three-play repertory. The company toured to cities including Milwaukee, Seattle, San Francisco, Los Angeles, Oakland, Sacramento, Salt Lake City, Cheyenne, San Antonio, New Orleans, Houston and Savannah, and up the east coast to New England.

As movies had eclipsed the stage to a large degree, there were major areas of the U.S. closed off to the tour. Many stops at smaller cities had not seen live theater since World War I, if ever. But box office records were set in most cities and towns. In New Orleans, women rioted when they found out that tickets had sold out. Variety reported that the tour gave 225 performances and played to 500,000 people. People in less urban areas traveled from two days away to see a performance, and the presenting towns gained a small but welcome swell in revenues from restaurants and hotels as a result.

The most famous story to arise out of the tour came when the troupe was to play Barretts on Christmas night in Seattle, McClintic's hometown. They planned to arrive in the morning, and as it normally takes six hours to set up the stage, do lighting and blocking checks and distribute costumes, they figured there would be plenty of time. However, it had been raining for 23 days, and roads and railroads were being washed out. The train moved very slowly, often stopping. The theater management telegraphed that the venue was completely sold out for the evening performance and wanted regular updates to assure the public that the production was on its way. The troupe kept up the telegrams, but eventually these lines gave out. By that evening, the troupe was still far from the city and gave up hope of doing any performance that night. The train finally arrived in Seattle at 11:30 pm. There was a lively crowd waiting for them at the train station, and the manager of the Metropolitan Theatre came up to Cornell and informed her that the audience was still waiting. McClintic asked, "how many?" "The entire house," was the reply, "Twelve hundred people." Cornell was shocked and asked, "Do you mean they want a performance at this hour?" "They're expecting it," the manager replied.

All 55 members of the cast and crew drove to the theater. Sets and props had to be protected in the downpour. As soon as the troupe arrived, the audience streamed back into their seats. Cornell decided that the audience could watch the sets for "Barretts" be unpacked and set up, and so raised the curtain. The stage hands, sound checks, and electricians worked to accomplish in one hour what normally took six. By 1 am, they were ready to begin the play. Biographer Tad Mosel writes: "The audience had paid the actors the supreme compliment of having the faith to wait for them, and the actors responded with the kind of performance actors wish they could give every day of their lives. When the final curtain fell at 4 am, they received more curtain calls than they ever had."

Ray Henderson, the troupe's publicist and manager, managed to get this story published the next day in every newspaper in America. Alexander Woollcott established a radio tradition on his program, The Town Crier. For years afterward, every Christmas, Woollcott told the story of the Seattle audience that waited until 1 am to see Katharine Cornell "emerge from the flood" and give the performance of her life.

=== Cast ===
Actor	The Barretts of Wimpole Street	Romeo and Juliet	Candida	Notes
Charles Brokaw	Alfred Moulton-Barrett	Benvolio		
Robert Champlain		Sampson		
Arthur Chatterton		An Old Man		
Katharine Cornell	Elizabeth Barrett Moulton-Barrett	Juliet	Candida	
Julian Edwards		Watchman		
Reynolds Evans	Henry Moulton-Barrett	Escalus		
Brenda Forbes	Wilson	Lady Montague	Miss Prosperine Garnett	
David Glassford	Doctor Chambers	Capulet		
John Hoyt	Henry Bevan	Peter • Apothecary	Alexander Mill	
Alice Johns		Nurse		
A. P. Kaye	Doctor Ford-Waterlow	Montague	Mr. Burgess	
George Macready	George Moulton-Barrett	Paris		
Merle Maddern		Lady Capulet		
Lathrop Mitchell	Charles Moulton-Barrett	Friar John		
Francis Moran	Captain Surtees Cook	Tybalt		
Irving Morrow	Septimus Moulton-Barrett	Balthasar		
Basil Rathbone	Robert Browning	Romeo	James Mavor Morell	
R. Birrell Rawls		Gregory • Officer		
Pamela Simpson	Arabel Moulton-Barrett			
Margot Stevenson	Bella Hedley			
Charles Waldron	Edward Moulton-Barrett	Friar Laurence		
Helen Walpole	Henrietta Moulton-Barrett			
Orson Welles	Octavius Moulton-Barrett	Mercutio • Chorus	Eugene Marchbanks	

== Broadway successes and maturation of style ==
=== Romeo and Juliet ===
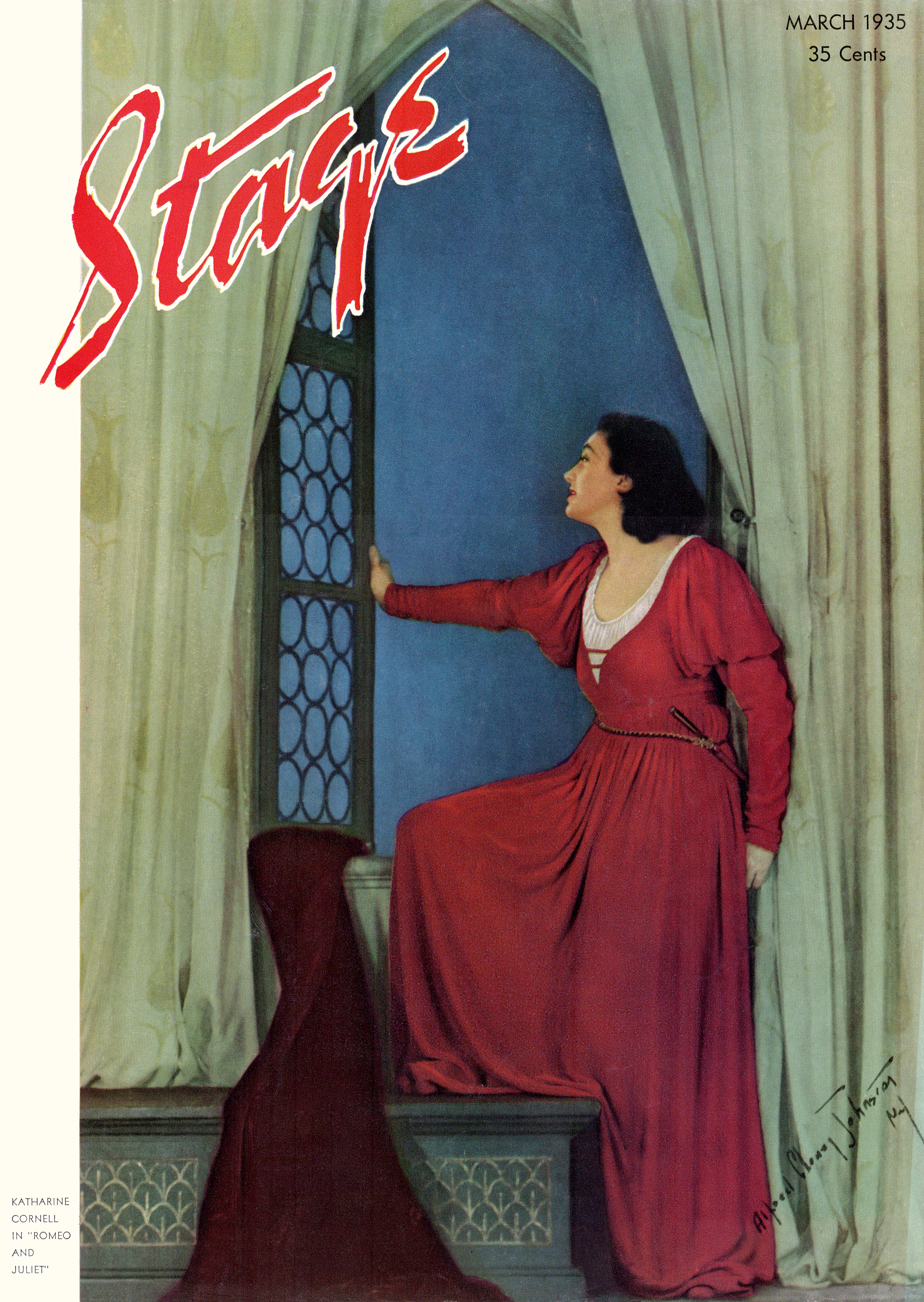
Cornell in the Broadway production of Romeo and Juliet, on the cover of Stage magazine (March 1935)

Although they had toured with this play, Cornell and McClintic decided to open Romeo and Juliet in New York with a completely new production. McClintic started over, with just a handful of the actors from the tour. Orson Welles was kept, but played Tybalt instead of Mercutio, making his Broadway debut. Brian Aherne took the part of Mercutio, Basil Rathbone played Romeo, and Edith Evans played the Nurse. McClintic's idea was to keep the play "light, gay, hot sun, spacious" with no hint of the doom that concluded the play. Also, he coached Cornell to read for meaning, sense and emotion, in place of the poetics of iambic pentameter.

This was a great break with past productions, which up until then had relied upon Victorian prudery and notions of how a classic play should be performed. McClintic reinstated the Prologue and believed that all twenty-three scenes were necessary, cutting only the comedy of the musicians and servants. For the first time, the carnal desires, the youthful romanticism, and the earthiness of language were given equal importance.

The production opened in December 1934, and, as usual, the reviews were glowing. Burns Mantle called Cornell "the greatest Juliet of her time." Taking note of the freshness of approach, Richard Lockridge of the New York Sun wrote that Cornell played Juliet as "an eager child, rushing toward love with arms stretched out." Cornell herself said that her biggest secret of acting is to do away with all excesses and embellishments, to bring an interpretation to its utmost simplicity. Margot Stevenson from the original cast later said that Cornell was "just this big Italian girl in love!" Stark Young wrote in The New Republic: She makes you believe in love, that Juliet loves, and that the diapason and poetry of love are the reward for its torment. Of various [other] Juliets this must have been one of the last things to be said."

John Mason Brown wrote in the New York Post:

It is not often in our lifetime that we are privileged to enjoy the pleasant sensation of feeling that the present and the future have met for a few triumphant hours...Yet it was this very sensation—this uncommon sensation of having the present and future meet; eye-witnessing the kind of event to which we will be looking back with pride in the years to come—that forced its warming way, I suspect, into the consciousness of many of us last night as we sat spellbound. Miss Cornell's Juliet is luscious and charming. It finds her at her mellowest and most glamorous. It burns with the intensity Miss Cornell brings to all her acting. It moves gracefully and lightly; it is endlessly haunting in its pictorial qualities; and reveals a Miss Cornell who equals the beauty of the lyric lines she speaks with a new-found lyric beauty of her own voice...To add that it is by all odds the most lovely and enchanting Juliet our present-day theatre has seen is only to toss it the kind of superlative it honestly deserves.

Later, the same critic determined that this role was a turning point in Cornell's career, as it meant that she could finally leave the "trifling scripts" of her earlier career and could meet the challenging demands of the greatest classic roles.

=== The Barretts revived ===
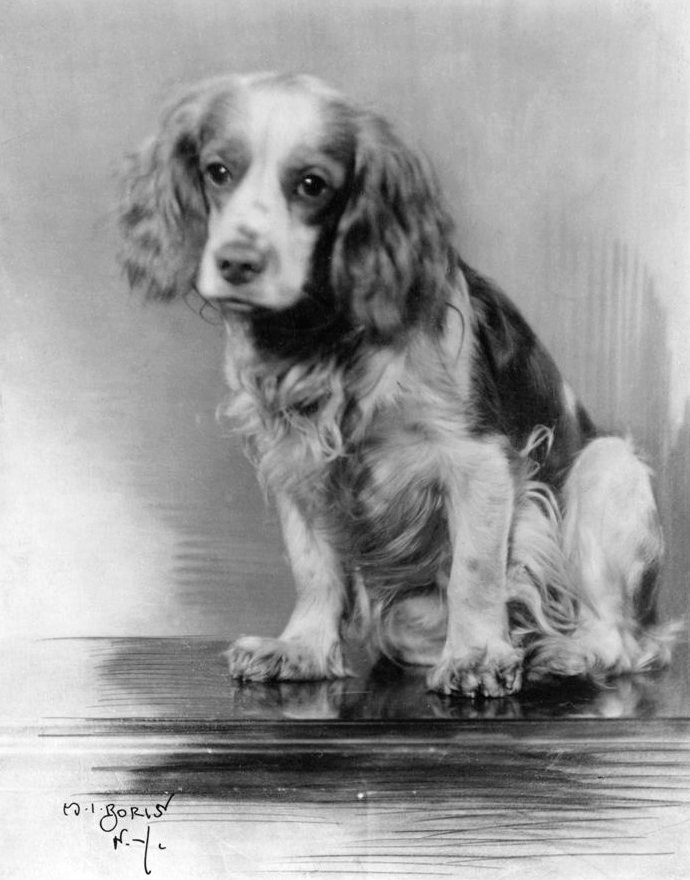
Cornell's dog Flush, the cocker spaniel that played the part of Flush in Barretts, died in July 1937. He had played his role 709 times, and traveled over 25,000 miles on tours. At his death, the Associated Press sent the story out over its entire network worldwide.

Romeo and Juliet closed on February 23, 1935, and two nights later, the production company revived The Barretts of Wimpole Street, with Burgess Meredith in his first prominent Broadway role. Critics found that this production had grown richer and more satisfying, but it closed three weeks later because other plays were contracted.

The next play, also starring Meredith, was Flowers of the Forest, an anti-war play by John van Druten that lasted only 40 performances and counts among Cornell's greatest failures.

=== St. Joan ===
For the next season, Cornell and her husband decided to do St. Joan by George Bernard Shaw. McClintic cast Maurice Evans as the Dauphin, Brian Aherne as Warwick, Tyrone Power as Bertrand de Poulengey, and Arthur Byron as the Inquisitor. The play opened on March 9, 1936, and Burns Mantle wrote that the triumph belonged to two maids, "the Maid of Domrémy, France, and the Maid of Buffalo, N.Y." John Anderson of the New York Journal wrote, "Before there is any haggling, let it be said that it is Shaw's greatest play and that Miss Cornell is superb in it. She is beautiful to look at and her performance is enkindled by the spiritual exaltation of a transcendent heroine."

It was in this play that Cornell's real artistry became apparent. Audience members talked of having been "changed" by her performance, and "mesmerized." Writer S.N. Behrman said "it was something essential in herself, as a person, that the audiences sensed and reached out to." Another said that she was like "radium, flashing its healing rays," while others used an older phrase, "magnetic influence."

The play closed in the spring of 1936 only because the production company had already contracted to produce Maxwell Anderson's The Wingless Victory. Saint Joan finished with a seven-week tour of five major cities.

=== The Wingless Victory ===
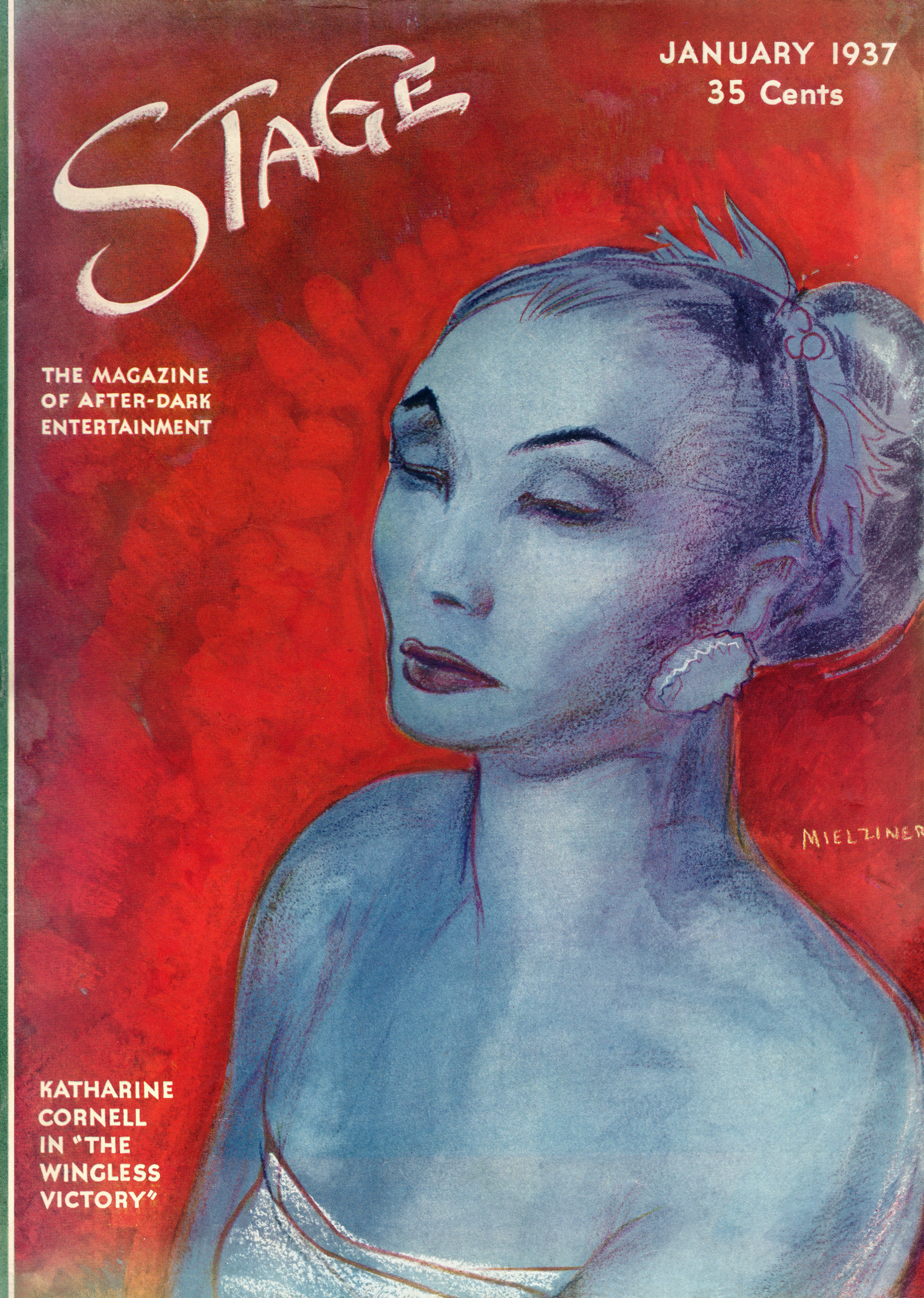
Jo Mielziner portrait of Cornell in The Wingless Victory, on the cover of Stage magazine (January 1937)

In Maxwell Anderson's The Wingless Victory, McClintic decided to avoid the so-called "star entrance," where the audience expects the star of the play to enter grandly to general applause. Instead, he had another character take the star entrance, and only then was it revealed that Cornell was onstage. The effect was startling. Opened in 1936, the play received mixed reviews, and many bad ones, but Cornell was respected for taking any role and twisting it to make it her own. Gently disparaging the play itself, Brooks Atkinson wrote that Cornell is "our queen of tragedy, a thoughtful actress and a great one."

Alternating with Victory, Cornell revived Candida with Mildred Natwick as Prossy. After the conclusion, she took a year off and wrote her memoir (with the help of Ruth Woodbury Sedgewick), titled I Wanted to Be an Actress and published by Random House in 1939.

=== No Time for Comedy ===
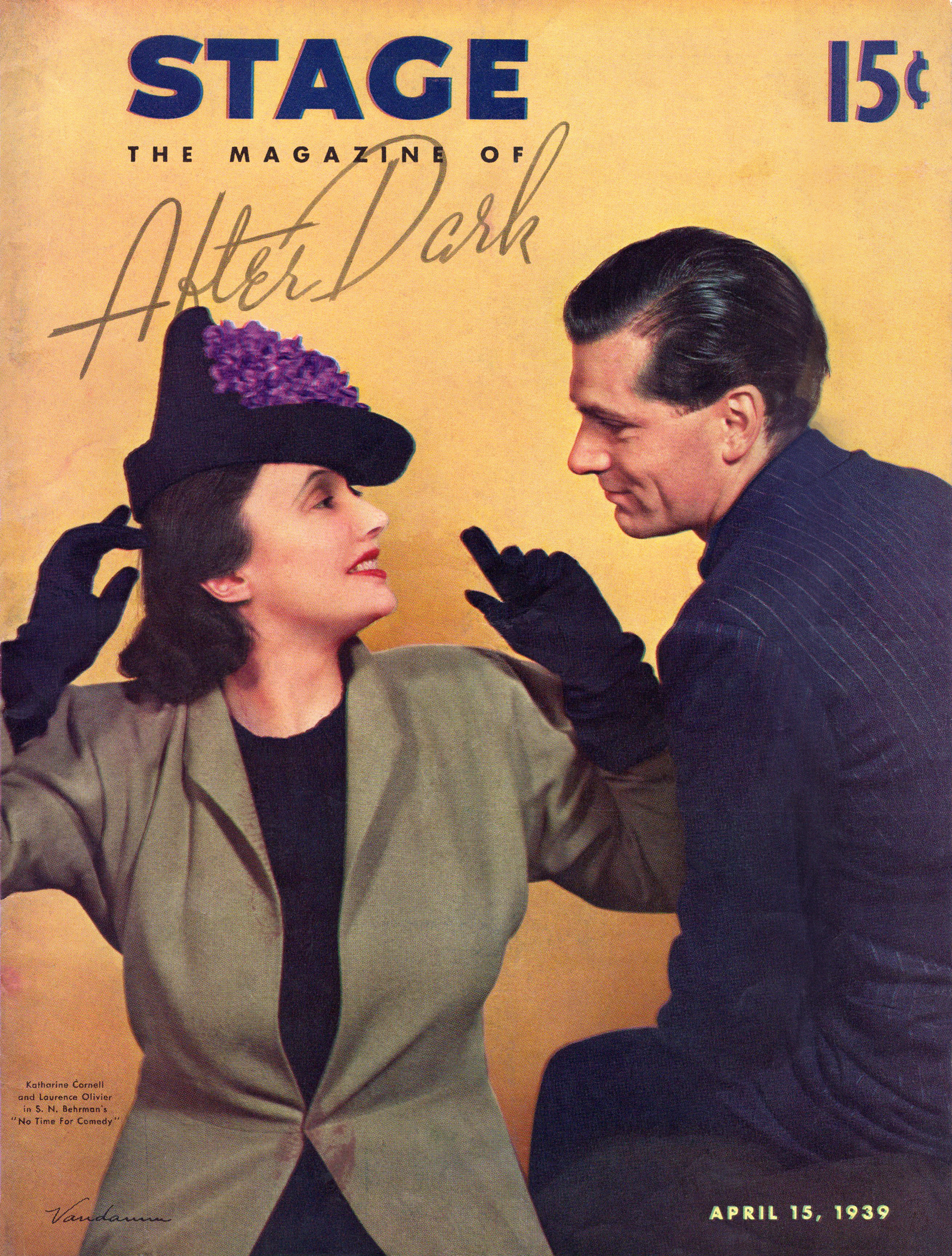
Cornell and Laurence Olivier in No Time for Comedy, on the cover of Stage (April 15, 1939)

Cornell's general manager Gertrude Macy produced a musical revue One for the Money, which starred unknown actors who later achieved fame, including Gene Kelly, Alfred Drake, Keenan Wynn and Nancy Hamilton. Immediately after that closed, Cornell starred in her second comedy, No Time for Comedy by S.N. Behrman. McClintic cast the young Laurence Olivier in the leading role of Gaylord. During rehearsals, Cornell had a difficult time with the comedic timing, and someone shook their head and said, "Poor old Kit!" Olivier shot back, "Poor old Kit is the most successful woman in the American theater! The richest, the most beautiful, the most sought after, the most distinguished, the most loved — Poor old Kit indeed!"

In his memoir, Behrman wrote, "Miss Cornell had less [exhibitionism] than any actress or actor I have ever known. Her position in the theatre transcended technique.... It was something essential in herself, as a person, that the audiences sensed and reached out to.... The whole stage and the other actors took light from the radiance of her personality."

The play opened on April 17, 1939, and became the third-biggest money-maker for Cornell, and the second production to gross over a million dollars. With a few cast changes, including that of Olivier, the play went on a nationwide tour.

=== The Doctor's Dilemma ===
Cornell next played in Shaw's play, The Doctor's Dilemma, and Raymond Massey starred with opposite her. Her production company was running so smoothly that Massey said "Whatever anyone tells you, Kit ran her own show. They will say everything was managed by those people around her, but it is absolutely not true. She knew everything that was going on and she made all the decisions. At the end of the day you could find her poring over the box office receipts. She was a shrewd and intelligent businesswoman."

The play opened in 1941 in San Francisco, just one week before Pearl Harbor, and was the only show not cancelled, despite numerous blackouts. Given the distraction of the war, the play was not well received. Gregory Peck was part of the tour as "the secretary."

== The war years ==
Shortly after the U.S. entered World War II, Cornell decided upon a revival of Candida to benefit the Army Emergency Fund and the Navy Relief Society. Of her five productions of this play, this fourth one is remembered for the star-studded cast of Raymond Massey, Burgess Meredith, Mildred Natwick and Dudley Digges. Cornell was able to convince all actors, Shaw, the theater hands and the Schubert organization to donate their labor, services and venue so that almost all proceeds went directly to the fund.

=== The Three Sisters ===
A year later, Ruth Gordon urged McClintic to produce Anton Chekhov's Three Sisters. Judith Anderson played Olga, Gertrude Musgrove was selected for Irina, and Cornell had the role of Masha. Others included theater legend Edmund Gwenn, Dennis King and Kirk Douglas in his Broadway debut. The play opened in Washington in December 1942, and was not expected to be much of a financial success. The opening was attended by Eleanor Roosevelt and the Soviet ambassador. It played for 122 performances in New York before going on the road, exceeding the low expectations. It had the longest run of any Chekhov play in the U.S. and the longest run of this particular play anywhere up to that point.

Cornell is said to have played Masha with a nobility of spirit without ostentation, and that she found the wit in her role. Time wrote, in anticipation of its opening, "Not for nothing is Katharine Cornell the top-ranking actress in the U.S. theater as well as a successful producer as well as the wife of able Director Guthrie McClintic. Over the years Cornell has performed many near-miracles. She has made the yearning soul as good box office as the fiery body. She has made an invalid lady on a couch the essence of glamor. She has turned Shakespeare and Shaw into rousing hits. And when, next week, she brings her revival of Chekhov's 'The Three Sisters' to Broadway, it will boast a dream production by anybody's reckoning — the most glittering cast the theater has seen, commercially, in this generation."

Cornell was featured for the second time on the cover of Time on December 21, 1942, with Judith Anderson and Ruth Gordon.

=== Wartime service ===
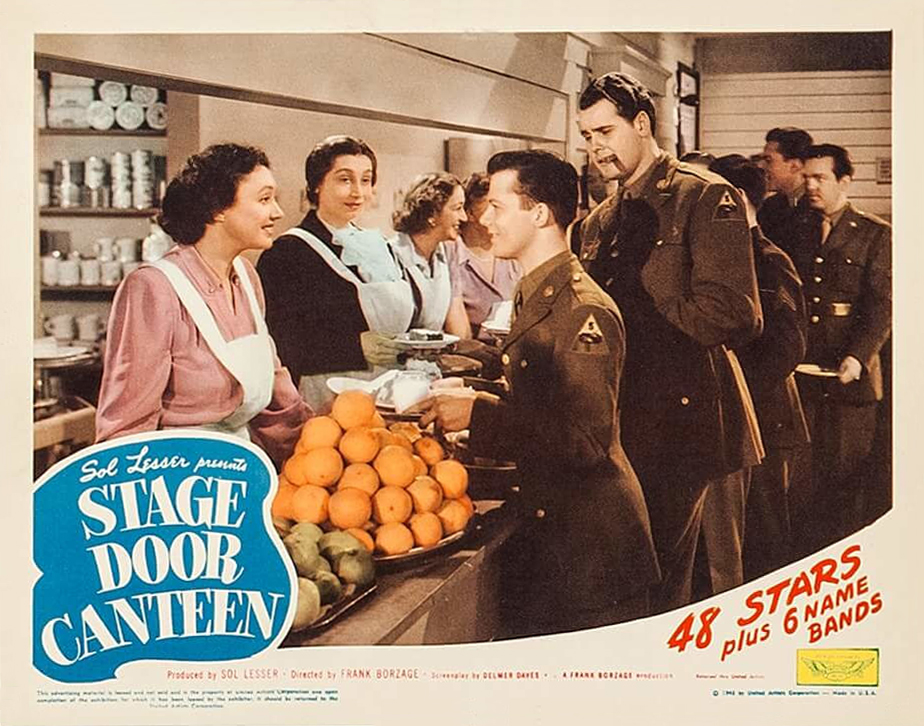
Cornell, Aline MacMahon and Dorothy Fields serve soldiers played by Lon McCallister and Michael Harrison in Stage Door Canteen (1943).

Cornell's only film role was speaking a few lines from Romeo and Juliet in the movie Stage Door Canteen (1943), which starred many of Broadway's best actors, under the auspices of the American Theatre Wing for War Relief. This organization was created by playwright Rachel Crothers, and created the Stage Door Canteen to entertain troops during the war. Cornell donated time to work at the Canteen cleaning tables.

General George C. Marshall asked Cornell to do a play to entertain the troops in Europe. Cornell decided to take The Barretts of Wimpole Street to the troops in Europe as a touring production with the USO and the Special Services Division. However, the USO and the Division stated that no G.I. would sit for a three-hour costume drama about two middle-aged Victorian poets. They suggested an alternative, some sort of "ribald farce" in case Barretts proved a failure. Cornell prepared Blithe Spirit, but nonetheless insisted upon Barretts, saying that if she was going to entertain the soldiers, she must take them her very best, and her very best was Barretts. The Army then asked that they cut the love scenes, as the play was far too long at three hours, wanted someone to "explain" the play to the men beforehand, and prepared her for what they saw as rude, tasteless and ignorant troops. The entire company, backed by Cornell and McClintic, resisted all entreaties and played their roles with every degree of authenticity as the Broadway original.

At the first production, the army's fears seemed to be validated. At the start of the play, which takes place in damp, chilly London, the doctor advises that Elizabeth go to Italy for rest. The audience, G.I.s fighting in war-torn Italy, exploded in laughter, hooting, yelling and stamping. Margalo Gillmore said "It was true, then, we thought, they would go on laughing and it would never stop and the Barretts would go under a tidal wave of derision. But we were wrong. Kit and Guthrie were holding the laugh, just as if they had heard it a hundred times, not showing any alarm, not even seeming to wait for it, but handling it, controlling it, ready to take over at the first sign of its getting out of hand. It rose and fell and before it could rise again, Kit spoke."

The play continued, and outbreaks of an occasional catcall, guffaw or heckling were quickly shushed by others. Gillmore continues: "Kit had a shining light in her. With that strange sixth sense of the actor that functions unexplainably in complete independence of lines spoken and emotions projected, she had been aware of the gradual change out front from a dubious indifference to the complete absorption of interest. At first they hung back, keeping themselves separate from us, a little self-consciously, a little defiantly, and then line by line, scene by scene, she had felt them relax and respond and give themselves up to the play and the story, til at last they were that magic indivisible thing, an audience. 'We must never forget this, never,' said Kit. 'We've seen an audience born.'"

The tour opened in Santa Maria, a small town 15 miles north of Naples, in 1944. G.I.s lined up three hours ahead of time and profusely thanked the cast afterwards. Brian Aherne wrote that after one show in Italy, the manager overheard a tough burly paratrooper say to his buddy, "Well, what I tell ya? Told ya it would be better than going to a cat house." Convinced of its success, the Army brass sanctioned two more weeks. The company eventually played for six months, from August 1944 to January 1945, throughout Italy, including stops in Rome, Florence and Siena. From there, the company was transferred under the aegis of General Dwight D. Eisenhower and played in France, including Dijon, Marseilles and Versailles. In Paris, Gertrude Stein and Alice B. Toklas wanted to see the play, but found that performances were strictly limited to enlisted personnel. They were given disguises and were able to see the play. Additionally, the cast made a point of visiting hospitals every day throughout the entire tour.

Now aged 51, Cornell was then told by the Army that she had done enough for the effort and to remain in Paris. Her response was to be taken as close to the front as possible. The company performed in Maastricht and Heerlen in the Netherlands, just eight miles from the front. The tour concluded in London amid exploding German V-2 bombs.

Upon her return to New York, Cornell found mail piled up from the G.I.s who had seen the show. They thanked her for "the most nerve-soothing remedy for a weary G.I.," for having brought "yearned-for femininity," reminding them that, unlike other USO shows, "a woman is not all leg," and for "the awakening of something that I thought died with the passing of routine military life in the foreign service."

Long after the tour was finished, Cornell continued to receive letters, not just from servicemen who had seen the show, but from wives, mothers and even school teachers from the home front. Their letters say that the first letter they received from their boy came after he had seen her show, or it was the first time they had heard from them in two years. Fellow actors reported that G.I.s in the South Pacific were heard to talk about the show.

After the war, Cornell co-chaired the Community Players, a successor to the American Theatre Wing, to assist war veterans and their families on their return home.

== Post-war changes ==
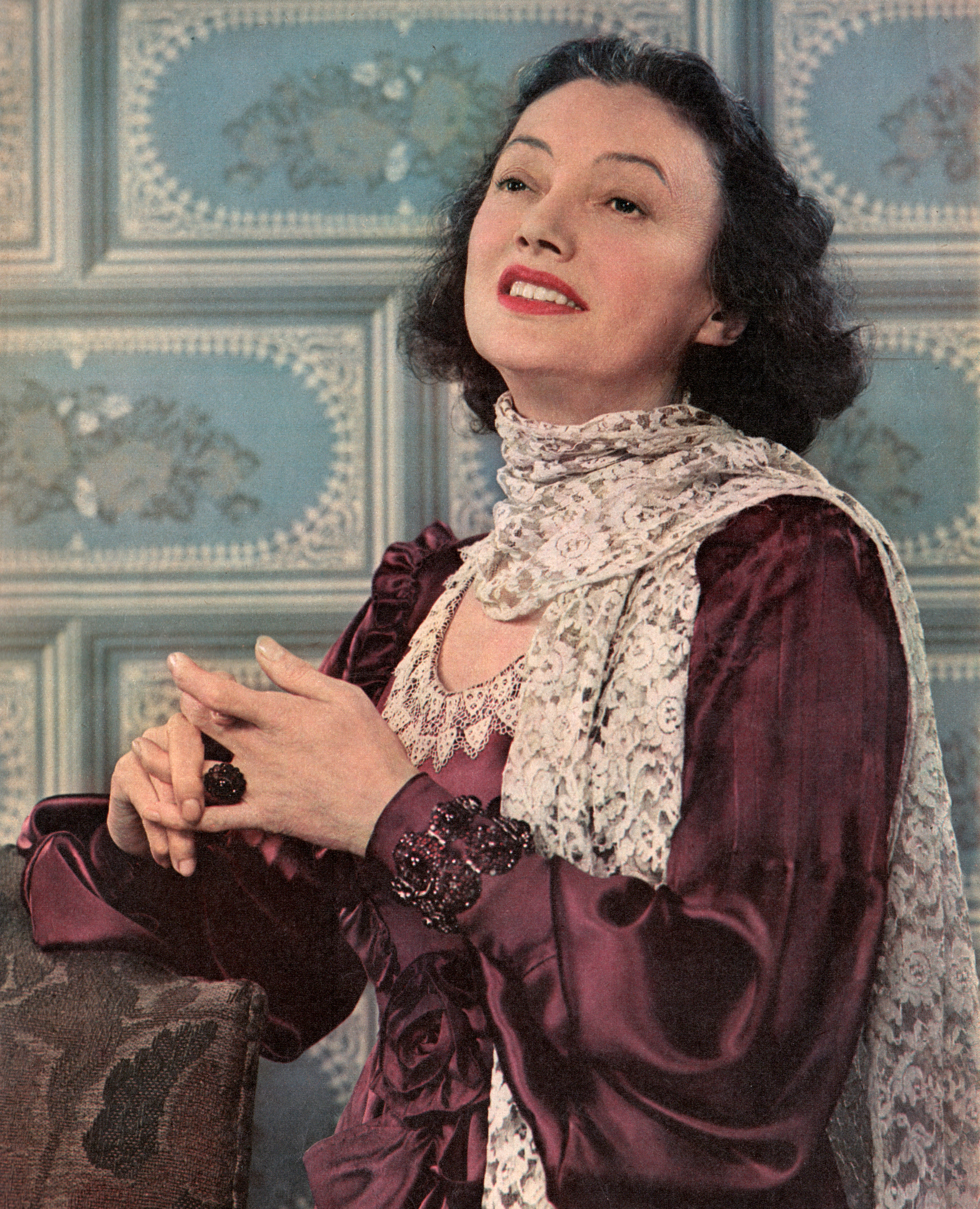
Cornell in 1945

=== Candida, revived ===
After the war, American theater was experiencing a change in style with the new generation. Cornell revived Candida for the fifth and last time in April 1946, with Marlon Brando playing the role of the young Marchbanks. Whereas Cornell represented an older, exuberant romantic style, Brando heralded the newer style of Method Acting, with its reliance upon psychological insights and personal experience. Although reviews were as good as ever, audiences and some critics had difficulty with the play itself, as the Edwardian drama had little relevance to post-war American life.

Now in her mid-50s, age-appropriate roles became harder to find. The plays that had earned her a reputation, playing young Elizabeth Barrett, Juliet, St. Joan, and various sexually charged women, were no longer playable by her.

=== Shakespeare and Anouilh ===
In 1946, Cornell chose Shakespeare's Antony and Cleopatra, which opened at the Hanna Theater in Cleveland, a difficult role for which she was ideally suited. Critic Ward Morrison praised Cornell's "beauty and power and grandeur and I do not hesitate to proclaim it one of the finest achievements of her career." Again, Cornell's presence insured that this play had its longest run ever, at 251 performances.

She followed that with Jean Anouilh's adaptation of the Greek tragedy Antigone. Sir Cedric Hardwicke played King Creon, and Marlon Brando was cast as The Messenger. After the opening, Cornell's friend Helen Keller told her "This play is a parable of humanity. It has no time or space." One critic stated "if the world and the theatre had more courageous spirits like [Cornell], our cumulative dreams would be greater, our thoughts, nobler."

Alternating with Antony, Cornell produced another revival of Barretts of Wimpole Street, for an eight-week tour to the West Coast, with Tony Randall in both plays, and Maureen Stapleton as Iras in Antony.

=== Postwar theatre ===
Finding good roles became increasingly a concern. Kate O'Brien dramatized her historical novel For One Sweet Grape into That Lady, set in the Spain of Philip II. A swashbuckling romance, the play was not well received. In 1951, Cornell played the lead in Somerset Maugham's comedy, The Constant Wife for a summer festival in Colorado. The play, starring her longtime favorite Brian Aherne, was produced again in New York and grossed more money for the production company than any other play.

In 1953, Cornell found a suitable role in The Prescott Proposals, about a United States Delegate to the United Nations. Christopher Fry wrote a verse drama The Dark Is Light Enough, set in 1848 Austria. The cast included Tyrone Power, who played the love interest, Lorne Greene, and Marian Winters. (Christopher Plummer was Power's understudy. In his memoir, Plummer states that Cornell was "the last of the great actress-managers," and that she was his "sponsor.") In 1957, Cornell staged There Shall Be No Night, the Pulitzer Prize winning play by Robert E. Sherwood, adapted to the events of the Hungarian Revolution of 1956. This play was adapted for TV and broadcast on NBC's Hallmark Hall of Fame with Charles Boyer, Bradford Dillman and Ray Walston. The Firstborn, another play by Fry, was set in Biblical Egypt, with Anthony Quayle playing Moses. Leonard Bernstein, recently appointed musical director of the New York Philharmonic, wrote two songs for the production. The play toured in Tel Aviv in 1958. She continued with several other forgettable plays, and her last production was Dear Liar by Jerome Kilty, which opened and closed in 1960.

Although Cornell was constantly performing, she took a three-year absence from 1955 to 1958 while she recovered from a lung operation. Additionally, with the exception of The Constant Wife, box office receipts were lagging even when she received excellent reviews. Tours continued to sell out, but even those began to fail as the decade bore on. By the end of the 1950s, the C. & M.C production company was finished. She did find time in 1954 to be narrator for the film The Unconquered, the life story of her friend Helen Keller.

Starting in the 1940s, however, she began to collect tributes from various theatrical organization and colleges and universities, which bestowed her with honorary degrees and awards.

=== Radio ===
Cornell made her radio debut May 6, 1951, on Theatre Guild on the Air. The program featured the first broadcast of George Bernard Shaw's Candida. On April 13, 1952, she appeared in Florence Nightingale, also on The Theatre Guild on the Air.

=== Retirement ===
McClintic died on October 29, 1961, of a lung haemorrhage, shortly after the couple had celebrated their 40th wedding anniversary. As he had always directed Cornell in every production since their marriage, she decided to retire from the stage altogether. She sold her residences and bought a house on East 51st Street in Manhattan, next door to Brian Aherne and down the street from Margalo Gillmore. Since all three were cast members of Barretts, East 51st Street became known as Wimpole Street. Cornell also bought an old building on Martha's Vineyard known as The Barn and made additions to it as well as restored the 300-year-old Association Hall on the island.

For her 80th birthday party in 1973, an assistant put together a tape of birthday greetings from Laurence Olivier, John Gielgud, and Ralph Richardson. The tape runs for seven and a half hours.

Cornell died of pneumonia on June 9, 1974 at The Barn in Tisbury, Massachusetts. She was cremated.

== On acting and the theatre ==
Cornell served on the Board of Directors of The Rehearsal Club. The club was a place for young actresses to stay while they looked for work, and offered support for their careers. Occasionally, she could be seen serving food to the women, and McClintic often found minor roles in his productions for them.

In her memoir, Cornell states: "I do think that the rapid success achieved by some people in pictures has seriously hurt the chances of a lot of young men and women who are studying for the stage. The success stories that we read in the Hollywood magazines make it all sound too easy. A youngster was a chauffeur yesterday and today he owns four swimming pools! It doesn't work that way on the stage... Some young actresses haven't been inclined to listen to me when I told that there was no royal road to success on the stage. Getting started in the theatre still has a great element of luck in it, of course. Some producer must see the right person at just the right time. To get that kind of break, a girl has got to keep pounding away and tramp the streets from one manager's office to another, no matter how discouraging it may be. At the same time, she must remember that when the break does come, she must have the equipment necessary to capitalise on it. I get the impression that most of the young girls who come to me for parts simply haven't worked hard enough. In New York they have every chance in the world to round out their education in their spare time. At the galleries along 57th Street they can see the best pictures in all the world. They can hear the finest music. They can get the best books in inexpensive editions. Best of all, they can listen to the finest actors and actresses of the day. When they tell me that they can't afford to go to the theatre very often, I usually find they think it beneath their dignity to sit in the top balcony!”

"I think the most important thing for young actresses to do is to learn to use their voices properly. I always found that reading French aloud helped me tremendously. I think that French makes you use your mouth more than any other language I know. I still occasionally read some French book aloud to myself before a performance."

== Legacy ==
Katharine Cornell was a versatile stage actresses of the early-mid 20th century, performing in comedies, melodramas, classical plays and contemporary works.

=== Theatres, media and research centers ===
The Tisbury Town Hall on Martha's Vineyard houses a theatre on its second floor. Originally known as Association Hall, it was renamed "The Katharine Cornell Theater" in her honor and later, her memory. A donation from her estate provided the funds for renovation (lighting, heating, elevator) as well as decoration of four large murals depicting Vineyard life and legend by local artist Stan Murphy. The Katharine Cornell Theater is a popular venue for plays, music, movies and more. Her gravesite and memorial are located next door to the Theater.

There is another theater space at the State University of New York at Buffalo named The Katharine Cornell Theatre in her honor. Many student productions are presented there year-round. Comedian Mark Russell performed many of his PBS shows there during its run between 1975 and 2004.

The Katharine Cornell–Guthrie McClintic Special Collections Reading Room was dedicated in April 1974 at the New York Public Library for the Performing Arts at Lincoln Center. The Billy Rose Theatre Division at the library holds extensive archival and special collections materials related to Cornell and McClintic.

Smith College has a collection of Cornell's papers dating from 1938 to 1960, plus additional materials in the papers of Nancy Hamilton.

The New York Public Library contains correspondence between Russian dance critic Igor Stupnikov and Cornell's assistants Nancy Hamilton and Gertrude Macy in the Billy Rose Theater Archive.

Cornell donated some of her costumes designed by the famed Russian fashion designer Valentina to the Museum of the City of New York. They include costumes for her roles in Cleopatra and Antigone.

Cornell and Quayle also recorded for LP a scene from Barretts, and Cornell recited a selection of poetry by Elizabeth Barrett from Sonnets from the Portuguese. Cornell's short scene in Stage Door Canteen can be viewed on YouTube. In it, she recites some lines from Romeo and Juliet.

Cornell was the narrator for The Unconquered, a 1954 documentary about the life of her friend Helen Keller.

==== The Paley Center for Media ====
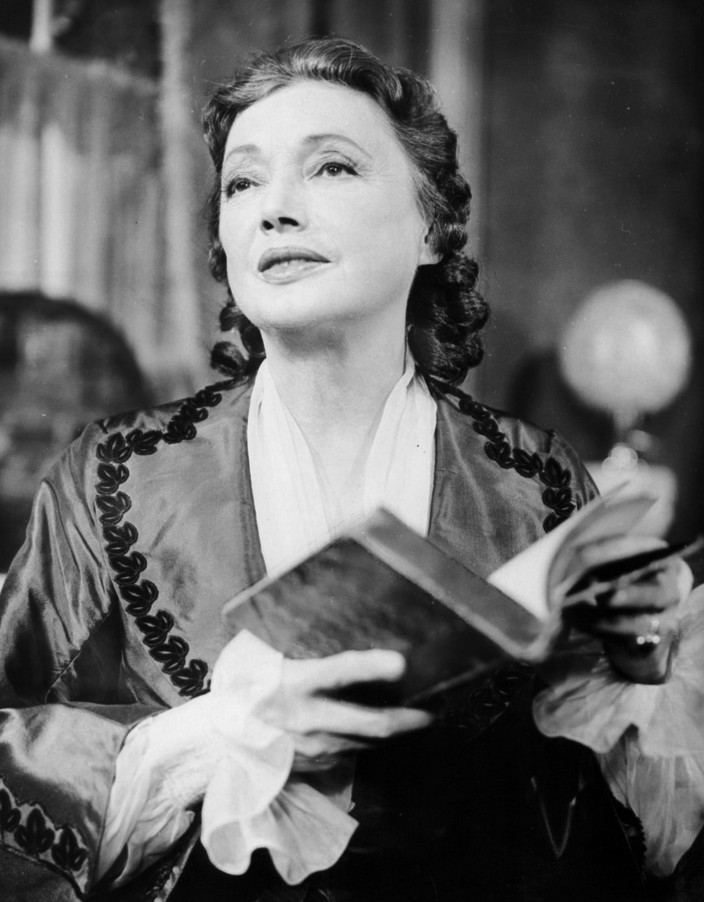
Cornell's TV debut in the Producers' Showcase production of The Barretts of Wimpole Street (1956)

The Paley Center for Media has a collection of Cornell's television appearances:

- On April 2, 1956, NBC broadcast of a production of Barretts with Anthony Quayle as Robert Browning. She was featured in Hallmark Hall of Fame's production of Robert E. Sherwood's play There Shall Be No Night, which was broadcast on NBC on March 17, 1957.
- On January 6, 1957, Dave Garroway interviewed Cornell for Wide Wide World: A Woman's Story.
- She appeared on TV as herself for an NBC Symphony Orchestra broadcast on March 22, 1952. She was also interviewed three times for the radio program Stage Struck, hosted by Mike Wallace.

==== Awards and honors ====
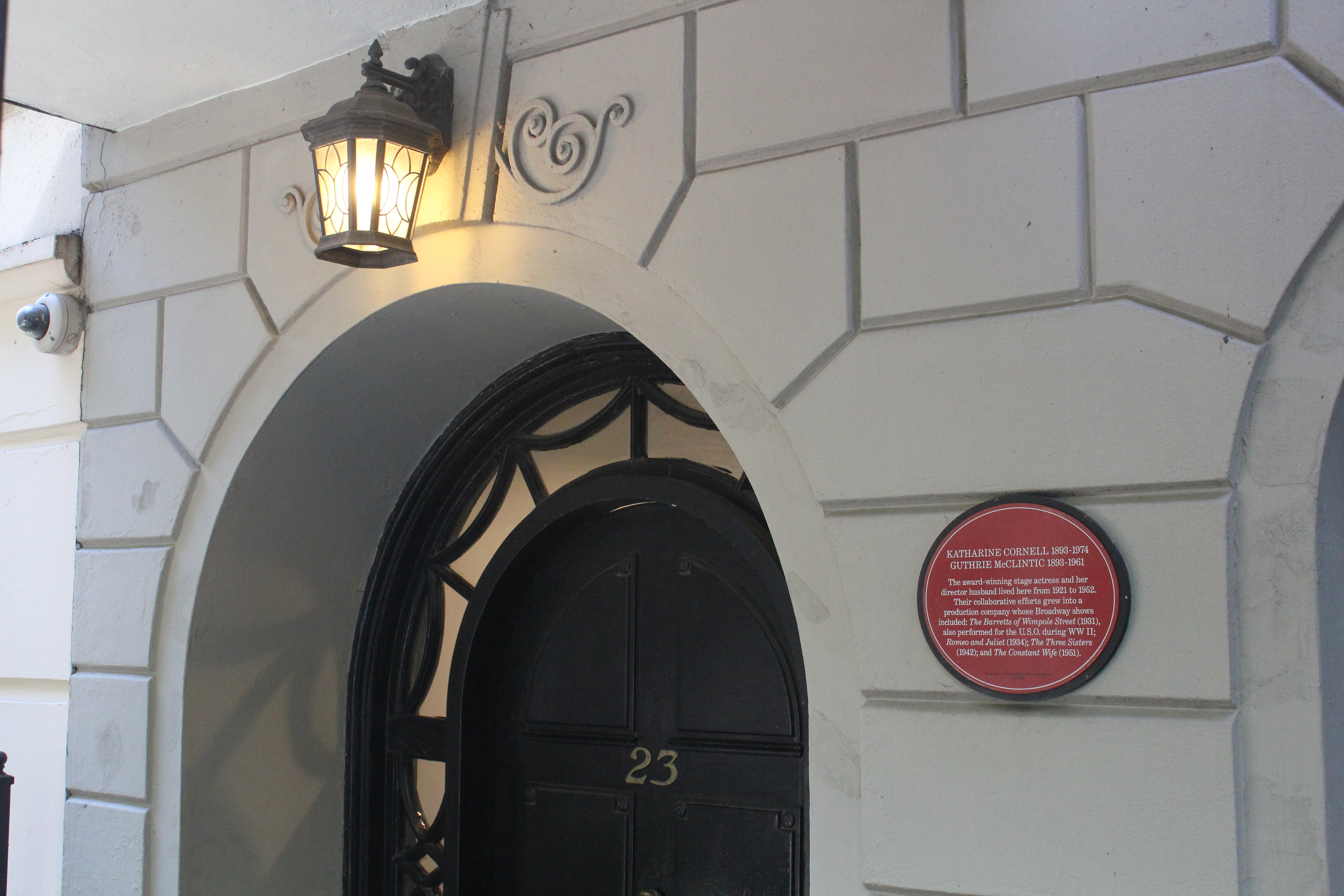
Plaque at 23 Beekman Place honoring Cornell and McClintic

Katharine Cornell one of three actresses awarded in the first Tony Awards (1947, award year 1948); her award was received for her performance in Antony and Cleopatra. She was also honored with the first New York Drama League Award in 1935 for her performance as Juliet. In March 1937, The Chi Omega sorority's National Achievement Award was given to her by Eleanor Roosevelt at a White House reception.

Cornell was awarded a medal "for good speech on the stage" by the American Academy of Arts and Sciences, and received a citation as Woman of the Year by the American Friends of the Hebrew University in 1959. After her role in St. Joan, she was awarded honorary degrees from the University of Wisconsin, Elmira College Smith College, the University of Pennsylvania, and Hobart. Clark University, Ithaca College and Princeton University|Princeton awarded degrees in the 1940s, and Baylor University, Middlebury College and Kenyon College awarded theirs in the 1950s.

On January 10, 1974, she received the American National Theater and Academy's National Artist Award for "her incomparable acting ability" and for "having elevated the theater throughout the world." In 1935, when the University of Buffalo was still a private institution, she was awarded the Chancellor's Medal of the University. The Artvoice, a weekly arts newspaper in Cornell's native Buffalo, each year awards the Katharine Cornell Award to a visiting artist for outstanding contribution to the Buffalo theatrical community.

The townhouse at 23 Beekman Place that Cornell and her husband lived in for many years has a historical marker in honor of their importance to New York City.

Katharine Cornell was one of the original members elected into the American Theatre Hall of Fame upon its establishment in 1972.

=== Biographies ===
- Katharine Cornell I Wanted to Be an Actress, 1939 by Random House.
- Guthrie McClintic Me & Kit, 1955 by the Atlantic Monthly Press/Little Brown Company.
- Lucille M. Pederson Katharine Cornell: A Bio-bibliography, 1994 by the Greenwood Press ISBN 9780313277184
- Tad Mosel with Gertrude Macy Leading Lady: The World and Theatre of Katharine Cornell, with a Foreword by Martha Graham, 1978 by Atlantic Monthly Press/ Little, Brown and Company.
- Gladys Malvern Curtain Up! The Story of Katharine Cornell, 1943 by Julian Messner, Inc., and includes a foreword by Cornell.
- Igor Stupnikov Ketrin Kornell, 1973 by Leningrad, Iskusstvo, Lening
- Inspired by The Barretts of Wimpole Street, Virginia Woolf wrote Flush: A Biography, 1933, by Harcourt, Brace — a fictionalized biography of the original dog owned by Elizabeth Barrett

=== Subject of artworks ===
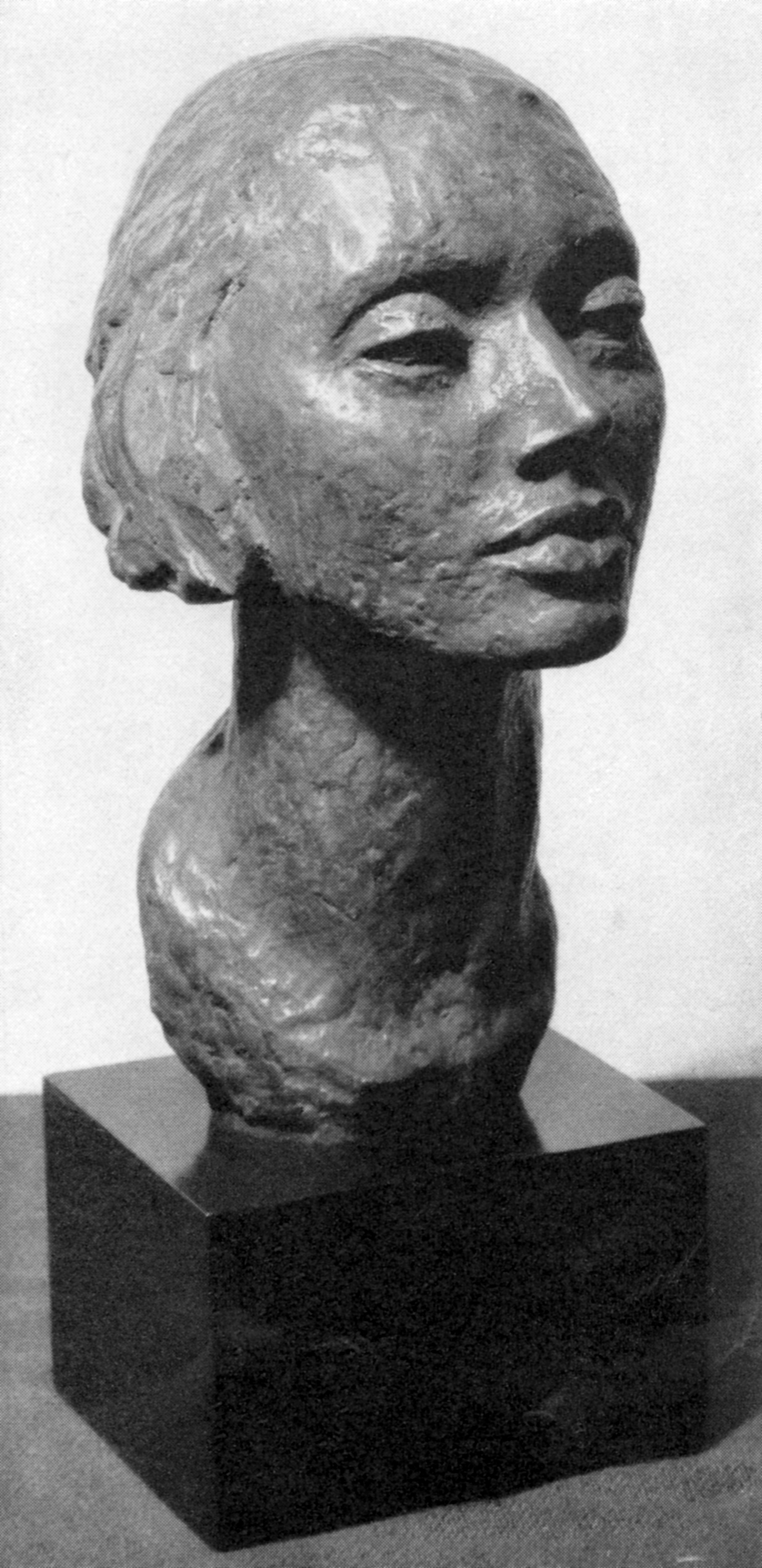
Bronze bust of Katharine Cornell by Anna Glenny (1930), in the collection of the Albright–Knox Art Gallery

The Smithsonian Institution holds a bronze bust of Cornell from 1961 by artist Malvina Hoffman. It also has a pastel portrait by artist and playwright William Cotton from 1933.

The Buffalo AKG Art Museum (formerly the Albright-Knox Art Gallery) in Buffalo, New York, has a 1926 full-length portrait of Cornell by artist Eugene Speicher in her role as Candida. The gallery also possesses a 1930 life mask by Karl Illava, an undated drawing of her as Elizabeth Barrett by Louis Lupas, and two sculptures by Anna Glenny Dunbar from 1930.

The Armstrong Browning Library at Baylor University has a portrait of Cornell in her role as Elizabeth Barrett painted by Alexander Clayton on display. The actress donated the portrait and several items related to Barretts to the library.

The University at Buffalo Libraries' Special Collections in Buffalo, New York, has a 1951 painting by surrealist artist Salvador Dalí titled "Portrait of Katherine Cornell.".

Cartoonist Alex Gard created a caricature of Cornell for Sardi's, the famed New York restaurant. It is currently housed in the Billy Rose Theatre Collection of the New York Public Library.

Although Cornell's ashes are interred in Tisbury, Massachusetts, there is a cenotaph in her memory in the George W. Tifft plot at Forest Lawn Cemetery in her native Buffalo.

=== The Katharine Cornell Foundation ===
The Katharine Cornell Foundation was funded with profits from Barretts. The foundation was dissolved in 1963, distributing its assets to the Museum of Modern Art (to honor her close friend from Buffalo, A. Conger Goodyear, who was a founder of MoMA and its first president), Cornell University's theater department, and the Actor's Fund of America.

=== Cultural references ===
Cornell is featured in a play by Buffalo-born playwright A.R. Gurney titled The Grand Manner. The play is about his encounter with Cornell as a young man when she was in the production of Antony and Cleopatra. The play ran during summer 2010 at Lincoln Center and starred Kate Burton as Cornell. In Buffalo, the play was produced by the Kavinoky Theatre in May 2011.

An allusion to Cornell is used as a plot point in the comedy The Man Who Came to Dinner by Moss Hart and George S. Kaufman. Sheridan Whiteside's personal secretary, Maggie Cutler, has fallen in love with local newspaperman Bert Jefferson. Jefferson has written a play, which Cutler says "just cries out" for Cornell. Whiteside, scheming to hold onto his capable secretary, instead convinces another actress to come seduce Jefferson under the guise of working on the script with him.
