= A Bill of Divorcement (1940 film) =

1940 film by John Farrow

- Directed by: John Farrow
- Screenplay by: Dalton Trumbo
- Based on: A Bill of Divorcement by Clemence Dane
- Produced by: Robert Sisk
- Starring: Maureen O'Hara; Adolphe Menjou; Fay Bainter
- Cinematography: Nicholas Musuraca
- Edited by: Harry Marker
- Music by: Roy Webb
- Production company: RKO Radio Pictures
- Release date: May 31, 1940
- Running time: 74 minutes
- Country: United States
- Language: English

A Bill of Divorcement is a 1940 film drama directed by John Farrow. It was also known as Never to Love and was based on a 1921 British play of the same name written by Clemence Dane that had been filmed in 1932 with John Barrymore and Katharine Hepburn.

== Plot ==
Hilary Fairchild returns home after a long spell in a lunatic asylum. He has regained his sanity but finds that his strong-willed daughter Sydney, now an adult, is planning to marry and that his wife has divorced him.

== Cast ==
- Maureen O'Hara as Sydney Fairchild
- Adolphe Menjou as Hilary Fairchild
- Fay Bainter as Margaret Fairchild
- Herbert Marshall as Gray Meredith
- Dame May Whitty as Hester Fairchild
- Patric Knowles as John Storm
- C. Aubrey Smith as Dr. Alliot
- Ernest Cossart as Rev. Dr. Pumphrey
- Kathryn Collier as Basset
- Lauri Beatty as Susan

== Production ==
The film was announced in November 1939 with the lead roles allocated to Adolphe Menjou and Maureen O'Hara. O'Hara had just moved to Hollywood with Charles Laughton and appeared in The Hunchback of Notre Dame. Producer Robert Sisk and director John Farrow had made a number of films together, including the popular Five Came Back (1939). It was considered an "A" picture, Farrow and Sisk's first such film at RKO.

Filming began on December 2, 1939.

== Reception ==
In a contemporary review for The New York Times, critic Theodore Strauss wrote: "Under the restrained direction of John Farrow, the performances of an ably selected cast are fused into a film that is continuously eloquent and moving. ... Out of a familiar play the producers have again drawn a suspensive drama of courage and despair."

The film recorded a loss of $104,000.
