= A Bill of Divorcement (play) =

Play

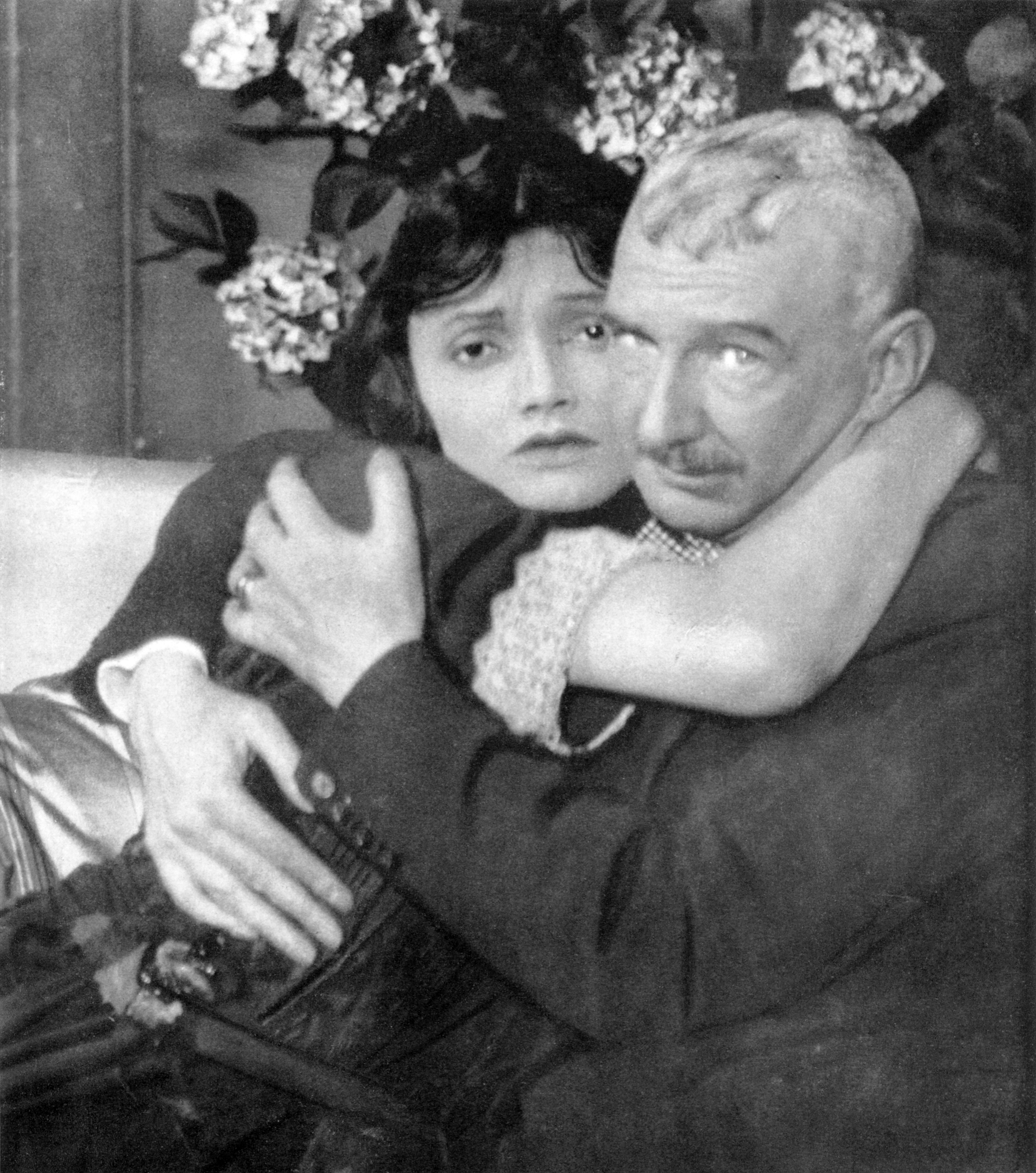
- Katharine Cornell and Allan Pollock in the Broadway production
- Original language: English
- Written by: Clemence Dane

Premiere
- Date: 1921
- Place: (UK) St Martin's Theatre

A Bill of Divorcement is a play by English author Clemence Dane. It was her first play, and her most popular, and was adapted to films of the same name three times, in 1922, 1932, and 1940.

== Synopsis ==
Though it was premiered in 1921, the play is set in the early 1930s. Margaret Fairfield divorces her husband, who has been in a mental hospital for many years, in order to remarry. Their daughter cares for the father and faces the fact that his mental illness may be hereditary. Although not permitted at the time in Britain, the play imagines a future where divorce is permitted where a spouse is incurably insane. Due to evolving cultural views, divorce was a popular subject in novels and drama of the time.

== London production ==
The play was first performed in London on March 14, 1921 at St Martin's Theatre, with Basil Dean as producer, and ran for 402 performances. The cast included Lilian Braithwaite, Malcolm Keen and Meggie Albanesi.

=== London cast ===
- Lilian Braithwaite as Margaret Fairfield
- Agnes Thomas as Miss Hester Fairfield
- Meggie Albanesi as Sydney Fairfield
- Dorothy Martin as Bassett
- C. Aubrey Smith as Grey Meredith (appears in 1940 film by Dr. Alliot)
- Ian Hunter as Kit Pumphrey
- Malcolm Keen as Hilary Fairfield
- Stanley Lathbury as Dr. Alliot
- Fewlass Llewellyn as The Rev. Christopher Pumphrey

== Broadway production ==
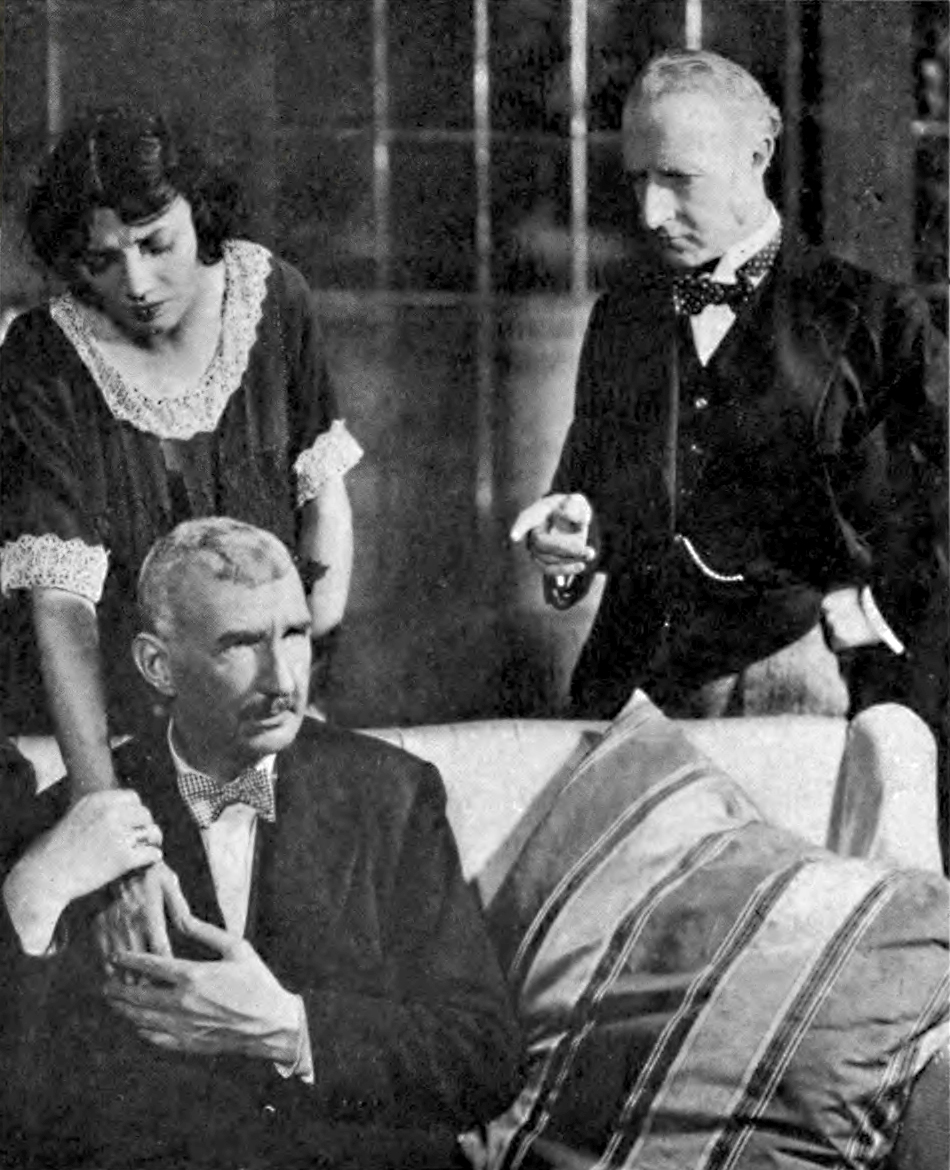
Katharine Cornell, Allan Pollock and Charles Waldron in the Broadway production of A Bill of Divorcement

The English actor Allan Pollock saw the play in London, and intrigued by the character of Hilary Fairfield, bought the American rights. Broadway producer Charles Dillingham had decided to try producing a serious drama in New York for the next season (instead of his customary musical comedies) and agreed to take it on. In America, the play was premiered at George M. Cohan's Theatre on October 10, 1921. Despite good reviews, audiences were slow to grow. The Cohan theatre had already planned to mount a new show when Divorcement began to grow popular, so the show was moved to the Times Square Theatre on November 7. It closed in March 1922, after a total run of 173 performances. After it closed on Broadway, it toured North America, and local revivals on both sides of the Atlantic occurred into the 1940s.

=== Broadway cast ===
- John Astley as Kit Pumphrey
- Janet Beecher as Margaret Fairfield
- Lillian Brennard as Bassett
- Katharine Cornell as Sydney Fairfield
- Fred Graham as The Rev. Christopher Pumphrey
- Ada King as Hester Fairfield
- Arnold Lucy as Dr. Alliot
- Allan Pollock as Hilary Fairfield
- Charles Waldron as Gray Meredith

== Adaptations ==
The play has been adapted into films of the same name three times. The 1922 silent version was a British production. The 1932 film was directed by George Cukor and starred John Barrymore and Katharine Hepburn. The 1940 film was directed by John Farrow.

Radio adaptations were broadcast in Britain during December 1935; in the United States during April 1941; and again in the United States on December 1, 1946.
