= Divorce Act =

The Divorce Act may refer to:

- Divorce Act (Canada)
- Divorce Act, 1869 (India)
- Divorce Act (New Zealand)

== See also ==
- Divorce law
