= A Bill of Divorcement (1922 film) =

1922 British film by Denison Clift

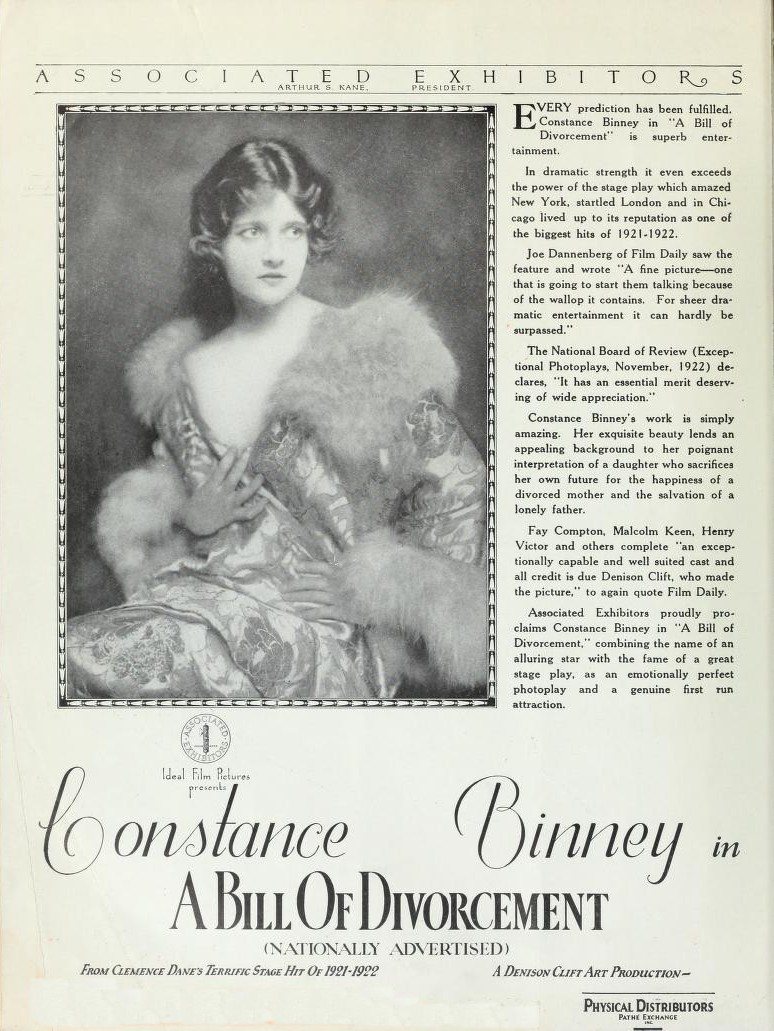
- Advertisement for film featuring Constance Binney
- Directed by: Denison Clift
- Based on: A Bill of Divorcement by Clemence Dane
- Starring: Constance Binney; Fay Compton; Malcolm Keen; Henry Victor
- Production company: Ideal Film Company
- Distributed by: Ideal Film Company
- Release date: 1922
- Running time: 6 reels
- Country: United Kingdom
- Language: Silent (English intertitles)

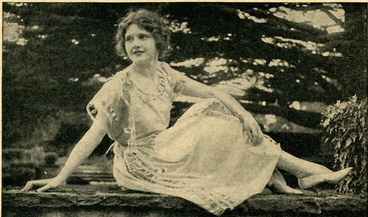
Constance Binney

A Bill of Divorcement is a 1922 British silent drama film based on Clemence Dane's play A Bill of Divorcement. The film was directed by Denison Clift and stars Constance Binney, Fay Compton and Malcolm Keen.

== Synopsis ==
A bill provides that after a certain length of time the wife of a man incurably insane is entitled to a divorce. Meg Fairfield secures a divorce from her husband Hilary, and is about to marry Gray Meredith when Hilary returns cured. Sydney, daughter of Hilary and Meg, is engaged to Kit Pumphrey, son of the parish rector who refuses to permit his son to marry Sydney when he learns her mother is divorced. How Sydney sacrifices everything that her mother may find happiness and remains with her father completes the story.

— The Film Daily, (15 October 1922)

== Cast ==
- Constance Binney as Sidney Fairfield
- Fay Compton as Margaret Fairfield
- Malcolm Keen as Hilary Fairfield (played same role in the play)
- Henry Victor as Grey Meredith
- Henry Vibart as Dr. Aliot
- Martin Walker as Kit Pumphery
- Fewlass Llewellyn as Reverend Christopher Pumphrey (played same role in the play)
- Dora Gregory as Hester Fairfield
- Sylvia Young as Bassett
