= Flying Frenchman (disambiguation) =

Flying Frenchman is a nickname.

(The) Flying Frenchman may also refer to:

- Cosmic Wind Flying Frenchman, an aircraft; see List of aircraft (Co–Cz)
- "The Flying Frenchman", a solo recital performed by Andrew Ling
- The Flying Frenchman, a bronze sculpture by César Baldaccini in Hong Kong

== See also ==
- Flying Dutchman (disambiguation)
