= John Buckler (actor) =

British actor (1906-1936)

- Born: John Henry Clanfergael Buckler; 1 April 1906; Cape Town, South Africa
- Died: 30 October 1936 (aged 30); Malibu, California, U.S.
- Occupations: Stage and film actor
- Years active: 1934–1936
- Children: 1

John Henry Clanfergael Buckler (1 April 1906 – 30 October 1936) was a British actor.

== Biography ==
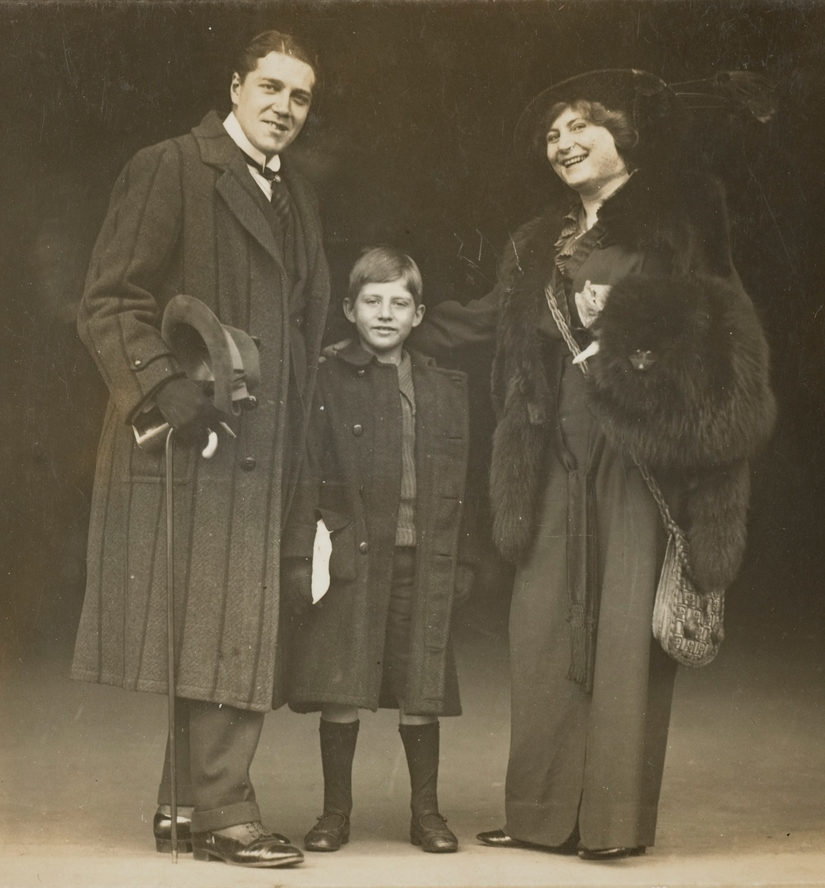
Buckler family 1914

Buckler was the son of the actor Hugh Buckler and his wife, actress Violet Paget. As a child, Buckler spent some years in England, before joining his parents in Australia in 1914.

Buckler made his Broadway debut in 1925 as an English Reporter in The Green Hat that was based on the novel by Michael Arlen. In 1930 he acted in Buffalo, New York, with the Whitehead stock company. He entered Hollywood films in 1934, signing with Columbia, which then loaned him to MGM, and he appeared in two MGM films David Copperfield (1935) and Tarzan Escapes as Captain Fry (1936).

On October 31, 1936, Buckler and his father were driving together in a heavy rain storm when their car skidded off the road into Malibou Lake, California. Both men died.

== Filmography ==
Year	Title	Role	Notes
1934	That's Gratitude	Clayton Lorimer	
1935	David Copperfield	Ham Peggotty	
1935	Eight Bells	Roy Dale	
1935	The Black Room	Beran	
1936	The Unguarded Hour	Defense Counsel	
1936	Tarzan Escapes	Captain Fry	(final film role)
