= Flying Dutchman (disambiguation) =

The Flying Dutchman is a legendary ghost ship.

Flying Dutchman may also refer to:

== Arts and entertainment ==
=== Films ===
- The Flying Dutchman (1923 film), an American silent film
- The Flying Dutchman (1925 film), a Swedish silent film
- Pandora and the Flying Dutchman (1951 film), a British drama film
- The Flying Dutchman (1957 film), a Dutch biographical film
- The Flying Dutchman (1995 film), a Dutch comedy
- The Flying Dutchman (2000 film), an American murder thriller

=== Music ===
- The Flying Dutchman, English translation of the title of Der fliegende Holländer, an 1843 opera based on the legend, by Richard Wagner
- Flying Dutchman Records, a jazz record label
- The Flying Dutchman, a 2005 album by André Rieu
- "Flying Dutchman", a song from Jethro Tull's 1979 album Stormwatch
- "Flying Dutchman", a 1992 song by Tori Amos, B-side to China

=== Other arts and entertainment ===
- The Flying Dutchman (novel), by Michael Arlen
- Flying Dutchman (SpongeBob SquarePants), a character in the animated TV series SpongeBob SquarePants
- Flying Dutchman (Efteling), a roller coaster in the Efteling amusement park, Netherlands

== People ==
- The Flying Dutchman (nickname), a list of people

== School sports ==
- Hofstra University in Hempstead, Long Island, New York, United States, until 2004
- Hope College in Holland, Michigan, United States
- Lebanon Valley College in Annville, Pennsylvania, United States
- Guilderland High School in Guilderland Center, New York, United States

== Transportation ==
- Flying Dutchman (train), a Great Western Railway (GWR) express passenger train service that ran from 1849 until 1892
- Flying Dutchman, a GWR 3031 Class steam locomotive, built in 1892 and withdrawn from service in 1912
- Flying Dutchman Funicular, an inclined railway at Cape Point, Cape of Good Hope, South Africa
- Flying Dutchman (sternwheeler), a 19th-century Canadian trading vessel
- Flying Dutchman (horse-powered locomotive), operated by the South Carolina Canal and Railroad Company in 1830

== Other uses ==
- 90377 Sedna, a trans-Neptunian object discovered in 2003
- Flying Dutchman (dinghy), a high-performance racing sailboat class
- The Flying Dutchman (horse) (1846–1870), English thoroughbred racehorse and sire
- Flying Dutchman (pigeon), a pigeon who received the Dickin Medal in 1945
- Flying Dutchman (tobacco), for pipes distributed by Royal Theodorus Niemeyer Ltd., a Dutch company
- Flying Dutchman, name given to a drift bottle that traveled 16,000 miles (1929–1935)
- Flying Dutchman, KLM frequent flyer program, now merged into the Flying Blue program
- the Flying Dutchmen, an 1868 football team from London
- Flying Dutchman, an off-menu hamburger variation sold at the In-n-Out Burger chain

== See also ==
- Dennis Bergkamp (born 1969), aerophobic Dutch footballer nicknamed the "Non-Flying Dutchman"
- Flying Dutch, 1991 fantasy novel by British author Tom Holt
- Frying Dutchman (disambiguation)
