= Outcast Lady =

1934 film by Robert Zigler Leonard

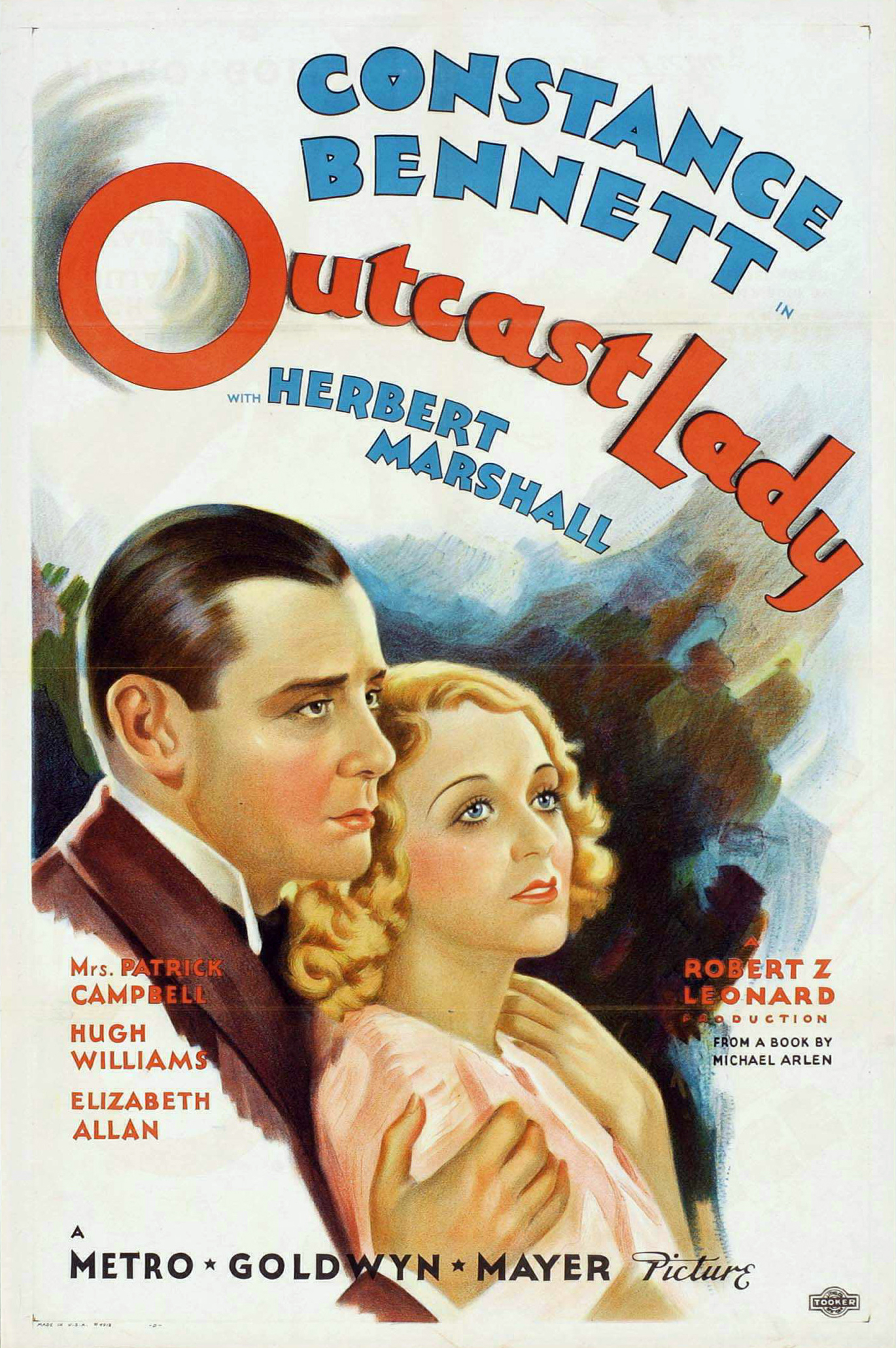
- Theatrical release poster
- Directed by: Robert Z. Leonard
- Written by: Zoe Akins
- Based on: The Green Hat; 1924 novel by Michael Arlen
- Produced by: Irving Thalberg; Robert Z. Leonard
- Starring: Constance Bennett; Herbert Marshall; Hugh Williams
- Cinematography: Charles Rosher
- Edited by: William LeVanway
- Music by: William Axt; Herbert Stothart
- Production company: Metro-Goldwyn-Mayer
- Distributed by: Metro-Goldwyn-Mayer
- Release date: September 28, 1934
- Running time: 77 minutes
- Country: United States
- Language: English

Outcast Lady is a 1934 American romantic drama film directed by Robert Z. Leonard and produced and distributed by Metro Goldwyn Mayer. The film stars Constance Bennett, Herbert Marshall and Mrs. Patrick Campbell. It is a sound version of Michael Arlen's 1924 novel The Green Hat, filmed in 1928 by MGM as A Woman of Affairs with Greta Garbo and John Gilbert.

== Plot ==
Iris March agrees to marry a longtime friend of her brother Gerald, Boy Fenwick, when her true love, Napier Harpenden, spends four years away from her establishing a business in India. However, on their wedding night, a stranger reveals a secret about Boy's past to her that, when he learns that she has been informed of it, drives him to take his own life. When she refuses to disclose that secret to explain his suicide, suspicions about her character grow, and she is alienated from her brother and most of her acquaintances.

== Cast ==
- Constance Bennett as Iris March Fenwick
- Herbert Marshall as Napier Harpenden
- Mrs. Patrick Campbell as Lady Eve
- Hugh Williams as Gerald March
- Ralph Forbes as Boy Fenwick
- Elizabeth Allan as Venice Harpenden
- Henry Stephenson as Sir Maurice Harpenden
- Robert Loraine as Hilary
- Lumsden Hare as Guy
- Leo G. Carroll as Dr. Masters (credited as Leo Carroll)
