= That's Gratitude =

- Still from the film
- Directed by: Frank Craven
- Screenplay by: Frank Craven
- Produced by: Bryan Foy; John Golden
- Starring: Frank Craven; Mary Carlisle; Arthur Byron
- Cinematography: Henry Freulich
- Edited by: Arthur Hilton
- Production company: Foy Productions
- Distributed by: Columbia Pictures
- Release date: October 8, 1934
- Running time: 70 minutes
- Country: United States
- Language: English

That's Gratitude is a 1934 comedy film directed by Frank Craven. The film was based on the stage adaptation of the same name.

== Cast ==
- Frank Craven as Bob Craft
- Mary Carlisle as Dora Maxwell
- Arthur Byron as Thomas Maxwell
- John Buckler as Clayton Lorimer
- Sheila Bromley as Delia Maxwell
- Charles Sabin as William North
- Helen Ware as Mrs. Maxwell
- Blythe Daley as Nora

== Reception ==
Wanda Hale of the New York Daily News rated the film 3.5 stars and recommended that people not familiar with Frank Craven's work see the film.

A contemporary review in The Film Daily was also positive, praising Craven's directing.
