= Tarzan Escapes =

1936 film by William A. Wellman, George B. Seitz, John Farrow, Richard Thorpe

- Theatrical release poster
- Directed by: Richard Thorpe; John Farrow (uncredited); James C. McKay (uncredited); George B. Seitz (uncredited); William A. Wellman (uncredited)
- Screenplay by: Cyril Hume
- Based on: Characters created by Edgar Rice Burroughs
- Produced by: Bernard H. Hyman; Philip Goldstone; Jack Cummings
- Starring: Johnny Weissmuller; Maureen O'Sullivan
- Cinematography: Leonard Smith
- Edited by: W. Donn Hayes
- Music by: William Axt
- Production company: Metro-Goldwyn-Mayer
- Distributed by: Loew's, Inc.
- Release date: November 6, 1936
- Running time: 89 minutes
- Country: United States
- Language: English
- Budget: $1,000,000

Tarzan Escapes is a 1936 Tarzan film based on the character created by Edgar Rice Burroughs. It was the third in the Metro-Goldwyn-Mayer Tarzan series to feature Johnny Weissmuller as the "King of the Apes". Previous films were Tarzan the Ape Man (1932) and Tarzan and His Mate (1934), with Jane's bikini-like attire and the famous skinny-dipping sequence. Weissmuller and O'Sullivan starred together in three more Tarzan films, Tarzan Finds a Son! (1939), Tarzan's Secret Treasure (1941) and Tarzan's New York Adventure (1942).

== Plot ==
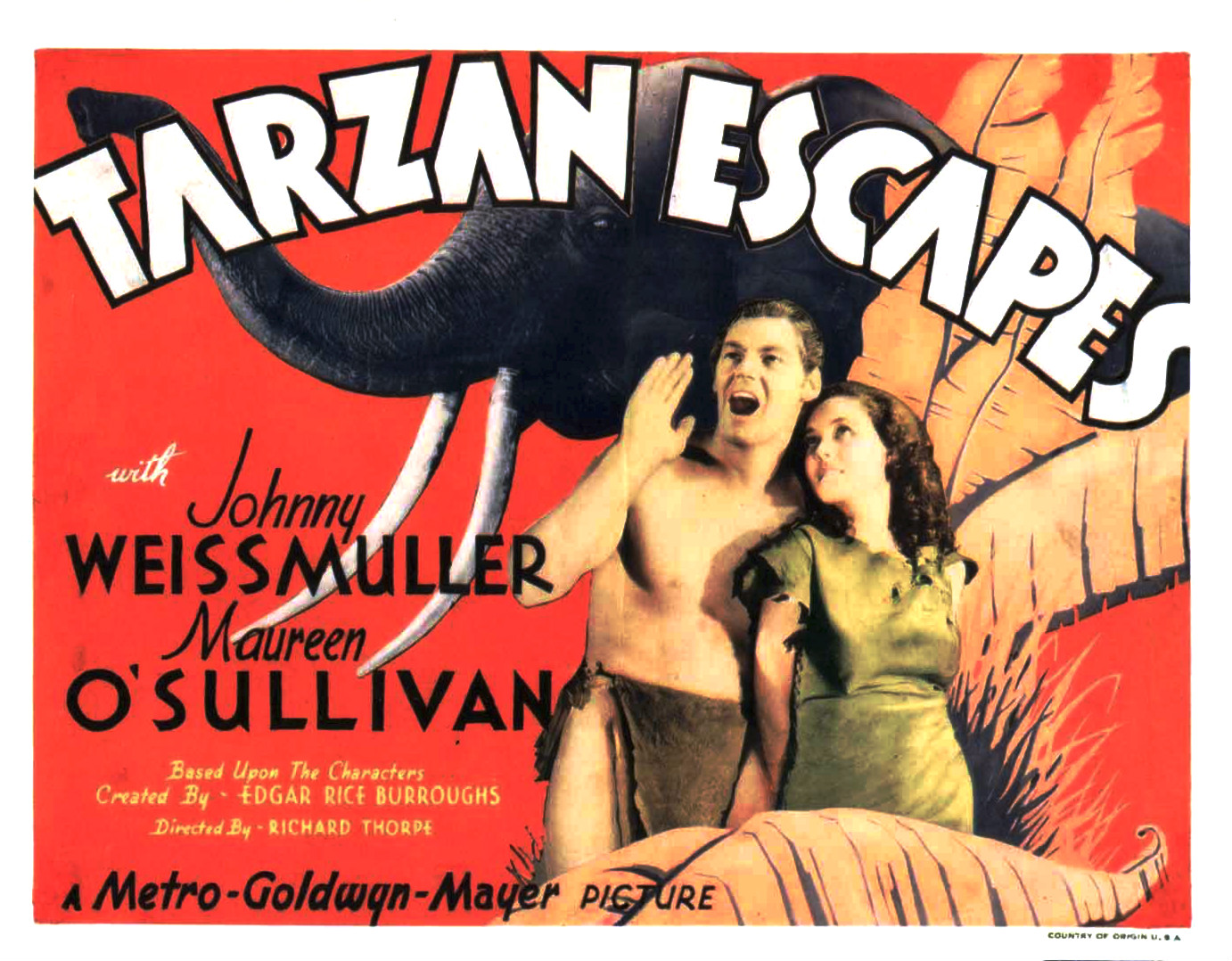
Lobby card

Jane's (Maureen O'Sullivan) two cousins, Eric and Rita, arrive in Africa to tell Jane about a fortune left to her back in their world and to try to convince her to return with them. They are led to Tarzan's escarpment home by Captain Fry (John Buckler), a hunter with an agenda of his own. Jane convinces Tarzan to let her go back with Eric (William Henry) and Rita (Benita Hume), promising that their separation will only be temporary. But Captain Fry (unknown to the others) attempts to capture Tarzan to take him back to civilization so he can be put on public display, and actually succeeds in caging Tarzan. Fry's treachery includes making a deal with an unfriendly native tribe to give him food, canoes and protection for the journey back in exchange for his handing over Jane, Eric and Rita for "ju-ju" and taking away the greatest "ju-ju" – Tarzan.

Fry's plan goes wrong when the natives capture Tarzan in his cage and all four white people are taken prisoner. Tarzan manages to escape with the help of elephants and Cheeta, and guides what's left of Fry's party through a cave passage filled with treacherous quicksands. Just before they exit the caves to safety, Tarzan forces Fry to go back the way they came as punishment for his betrayal. Fry starts to go back, then seizes a heavy branch to attack Tarzan, but before he can exit the cave he falls into a quicksand bog (filled with "poisonous" iguanas) and is swallowed up. Rita and Eric tell Jane that it is not necessary for her to return with them and that she belongs with Tarzan. The film ends with Tarzan and Jane reunited at their tree house.

== Cast ==
- Johnny Weissmuller as Tarzan
- Maureen O'Sullivan as Jane
- John Buckler as Captain John Fry
- Benita Hume as Rita
- William Henry as Eric
- Herbert Mundin as Rawlins
- E. E. Clive as Masters
- Darby Jones as Bomba
- Everett Brown as Hostile Native Chief
- Johnny Eck as Gooney-Bird
- Monte Montague as Riverboat Captain

== Production ==
The previous Tarzan film Tarzan and His Mate had a number of directors. Maureen O’Sullivan has said that James C. McKay actually directed the film. His official credit on that picture was Animal Director. McKay (1894–1971) had a resume full of various credits, and he jumped back and forth between the jobs of director and editor. McKay had received a Production Assistant credit on Trader Horn (1931), directed by W. S. Van Dyke. McKay was initially given the director's chair for the sequel, Tarzan Escapes (1936), indicating that MGM must have been happy with the work he did on Tarzan & His Mate; however, there would be many changes to cast and crew on that film too (including Elmer Sheeley replacing Cedric Gibbons as art director). John Farrow was handed the director's chair; reportedly he then practically re-shot the whole film. Regardless, Richard Thorpe ended up being given director's credit. Farrow (who had a fling with Dolores del Río) married Maureen O'Sullivan before the year was through.

== Deleted scene ==
A scene, which took a week to shoot, featuring Tarzan fighting vampire bats, was cut from the final edit after test audiences found the scenes too intense. The film's first director James C. McKay shot many of the "gruesome" scenes, but he was replaced by John Farrow in 1936 who re-shot much of the film. Richard Thorpe would finally get credit for directing the film.

== Critical reception ==
Describing Tarzan as a "pithecanthrope" and Cheetah as "the Martha Raye of chimpanzees," a review of the film in The New York Times reported that its "wealth of animal sequences [...] slyly propitiated the sentimentalists and zoolaters," that "the film is almost pure circus," and that "the action [is] effectively slow-paced." A review of the film in Variety noted that "Johnny Weissmuller once again looks good as the jungle boy. And O’Sullivan is also okay once more as the loving wife, but considerably more covered up in clothing [compared to her earlier Tarzan films]," but that "Cheetah [...] provides the picture with its most legitimately comical and best moments."

Film review aggregator Rotten Tomatoes reported an approval rating of 71%, based on 7 reviews, with a rating average of 6.1/10.
