= The Green Hat (novel) =

Michael Arlen's novel The Green Hat

- Author: Michael Arlen
- Language: English
- Genre: Fiction
- Publisher: William Collins, Sons
- Publication date: January 1, 1924
- Publication place: United Kingdom
- Media type: Print (Hardback)
- Preceded by: Piracy
- Followed by: Young Men in Love

The Green Hat is a 1924 sentimental novel about the bright young things of London by Michael Arlen. The protagonist of the novel, Iris Storm, is a femme fatale with a Hispano-Suiza automobile who is involved in romantic affairs in Bohemian London in the post-World War One era.

== Background ==
The genesis of the novel was Arlen's relationship with writer Nancy Cunard in 1920, although she was married to Sydney Fairbairn at the time and was also involved with Aldous Huxley.

During the 1920s, Arlen rented rooms opposite 'The Grapes' public house in Shepherd Market, then a bohemian Mayfair address. He used Shepherd Market as the setting for the novel.

== Reception ==
The novel was well-reviewed and became a best-seller. The August 16, 1924 edition of The World's News (Sydney, Australia) carried an anonymous review of the novel, which was positive:

The author calls this particular story "A Romance for a Few People." It should however, on its literary merits alone, be read by quite a large number. It is clever, epigrammatic, and provoking. Iris March is the heroine, and she comes into the story when she is 29 and has already had two husbands. Her further fortunes, with which the story is taken up, are ranged round about yet another man. She arrives one night at the flats where the narrator of the story resides, in a great big motor car, searching for her brother, a neurotic writer, of the peculiar moody temperament which betokens that class of individual. The narrator opens the door for her, directs her to the brother's flat, but he is too inebriated to recognise her, and the narrator and the lady in "The Green Hat" come together in this manner. From this chance acquaintance, the lives of the narrator and the lady are intertwined, and resultant therefrom are keen satirical descriptions of present-day life. It is a novel quite out of the common, not only because of its literary merit, but of its gift of clever dialogue and smart epigram. A story which all must judge for themselves.

== On stage and screen ==
The Green Hat was a best-seller, and Arlen adapted the novel into a four-act stage play in 1925. Both the novel and the play were quite controversial. The play was staged on Broadway by Guthrie McClintic, with Katharine Cornell and Leslie Howard in the cast. Premiering on September 15, 1925, it had a run of 251 performances.

The 1928 Metro-Goldwyn-Mayer drama film A Woman of Affairs directed by Clarence Brown and starring Greta Garbo, John Gilbert, Douglas Fairbanks Jr. and Lewis Stone, is based on it. The Green Hat was considered so daring in the United States that the producers did not allow any associations with it. The film was renamed A Woman of Affairs, and the characters were also renamed to mollify the censors. In particular, the film script eliminated all the references to heroin use, homosexuality and syphilis that were at the core of the tragedies involved.

== Copyright status ==
The novel The Green Hat entered the public domain on January 1, 2020, exactly 96 years after it was first published on New Year's Day 1924 by William Collins, Sons in the United Kingdom.
