= The Black Room (1935 film) =

1935 film by Roy William Neill

- Film poster
- Directed by: Roy William Neill (as R. William Neill)
- Screenplay by: Arthur Strawn; Henry Myers
- Story by: Arthur Strawn
- Produced by: Robert North
- Starring: Boris Karloff
- Cinematography: Allen G. Siegler
- Edited by: Richard Cahoon
- Color process: Black and white
- Production company: Columbia Pictures
- Distributed by: Columbia Pictures
- Release date: July 15, 1935
- Running time: 68 minutes
- Country: United States
- Language: English

The Black Room (released in Great Britain as The Black Room Mystery) is a 1935 American horror film directed by Roy William Neill (as R. William Neill) and starring Boris Karloff. Cinematography was done by Allen G. Siegler.

== Plot ==
In a Tyrolean castle in the late 18th century, twin sons, Gregor and Anton, are born to the de Berghmann baronial family. The baron is concerned: an old prophecy in the family states that the younger brother shall kill the elder in the Black Room of the castle. Prior to dying, the Baron has the Black Room sealed up.

Twenty years later in 1834, it is revealed that the Baron Gregor has become a depraved ruler who murders the wives of local peasants. His brother, Anton, who cannot use his right arm and has spent much of his life traveling Europe, returns to the castle for a visit, but refuses to believe the rumors he hears about Gregor. The kindly Anton becomes popular with the villagers and the castle staff, being the exact opposite of his brother. At the same time, Gregor's attempts to woo Thea, daughter of family advisor Colonel Hassell, fail noticeably before both her admiration for Anton and her true love for young Lieutenant Albert Lussan.

When the castle servant Mashka disappears after being seen with Gregor, the locals form a mob and enter the castle, confronting the baron. Gregor agrees to abdicate, and give power to his brother, who has become popular. After the papers are signed to relinquish his baronetcy to Anton, Gregor lures his unsuspecting brother to the Black Room, kills him, and throws him into the pit where the dead bodies of Mashka and his other victims are kept. Gregor now assumes Anton's identity, and prepares to wed Thea, whose father supports their union. Lt. Lussan angrily and threateningly objects to the Colonel; Gregor kills the Colonel when a game of chess and his signing of a document reflected in a mirror both expose him, and then easily frames the Lieutenant, who is found guilty and sentenced to death.

Following this, only Anton's mastiff recognizes that the baron is not his master, and the dog pursues Gregor when he travels to town for his wedding. Meanwhile, Lussan escapes his cell and meets secretly with Thea, who urges him to flee. He refuses, however, and the wedding ceremony begins in the town cathedral. As the stately ceremony draws to a close, the priest asks for any who object to the union to "speak now or forever hold their peace", and the dog attacks "Anton", who defends himself with his supposedly paralyzed right arm. Standing thus revealed, Gregor flees. The townspeople gathered for the wedding form a mob in a matter of seconds. The dog, followed by the mob, which includes Lussan, pursues Gregor to the castle, where he attempts to hide in the Black Room. The mob discovers where he is and begins to batter open the secret door. Before they can gain passage, however, the dog squeezes through and throws himself on Gregor, who falls backward into the pit and onto the knife still held in his murdered brother's hand. Thus, the prophecy is fulfilled.

== Cast ==
- Boris Karloff as Baron Gregor de Berghmann / Anton de Berghmann
- Marian Marsh as Thea Hassel
- Robert Allen as Lt. Albert Lussan
- Thurston Hall as Col. Paul Hassel
- Katherine DeMille as Maska (as Katherine De Mille)
- John Buckler as Buran
- Henry Kolker as Baron de Bergman
- Colin Tapley as Lt. Paul Hassel
- Torben Meyer as Peter

== Response ==
Writing for The Spectator in 1935, Graham Greene described the film as "absurd and exciting", and "wildly artificial." Greene praised both the acting of Karloff and the direction of Neill, noting that Karloff had been given a long speaking part and "allowed to act at last", and that Neill had "caught the genuine Gothic note" in a manner that displayed more historical sense than any of Alexander Korda's films. Author and film critic Leonard Maltin awarded the film three out of four stars, calling it "[an] Excellent, understated thriller". Maltin also praised Karloff's performance as one of the actor's best.

From retrospective reviews, Tony Rayns reviewed the film in Sight & Sound, finding The Black Room as having "obvious aspirations to be a Paramount movie" noting its setting and "lavish deployment of crowds of extras". Rayns found that Karloff appeared to be relishing his dual role and that he "makes the most of some Hays Code defying hints of blasphemy."

== See also ==
- List of American films of 1935
- Boris Karloff filmography
