= Flying Frenchman =

List of people with the nickname

Flying Frenchman is a nickname.

== List ==
People with this nickname include:

- Tariq Abdul-Wahad (born 1974; fl. 1990s–2000s), French basketball player and coach
- Édouard Carpentier (1926–2010; fl. 1950s–1960s), France-born Canadian pro-wrestler
- Leon Duray (1894–1956; fl. 1920s), U.S. racecar driver
- Claude Gnakpa (born 1983; fl. 2000s–2010s), French soccer player
- Guy Lafleur (1951–2022; fl. 1970s–1980s), Quebecois French-Canadian and Canadiens hockey player
- Leo Lafrance (1902–1993; fl. 1920s–1930s), Quebecois French-Canadian and Canadiens hockey player
- Newsy Lalonde (1887–1970; fl. 1900s–1920s), Franco-Ontarian French-Canadian and Canadiens hockey player
- Manu "Flying Frenchman" Lataste (fl. 2020s), a participant on the Go-Big Show talent show
- Dave McKigney (1932–1988; fl. 1950s), Canadian pro-wrestler with the ringname 'Flying Frenchman' Jacques Dubois
- Raphaël Poirée (born 1974; fl. 1990s–2000s), French biathlete
- Marcel Pronovost (1930–2015; fl. 1950s–1970s), Quebecois French-Canadian hockey player, nicknamed "Detroit's own Flying Frenchman"
- Franky Zapata (born 1978; fl. 2010s), French water powersportsman and inventor of the Flyboard hydroflight device

== See also ==
- The Flying Dutchman (nickname)
