= A Woman of Affairs =

1928 film

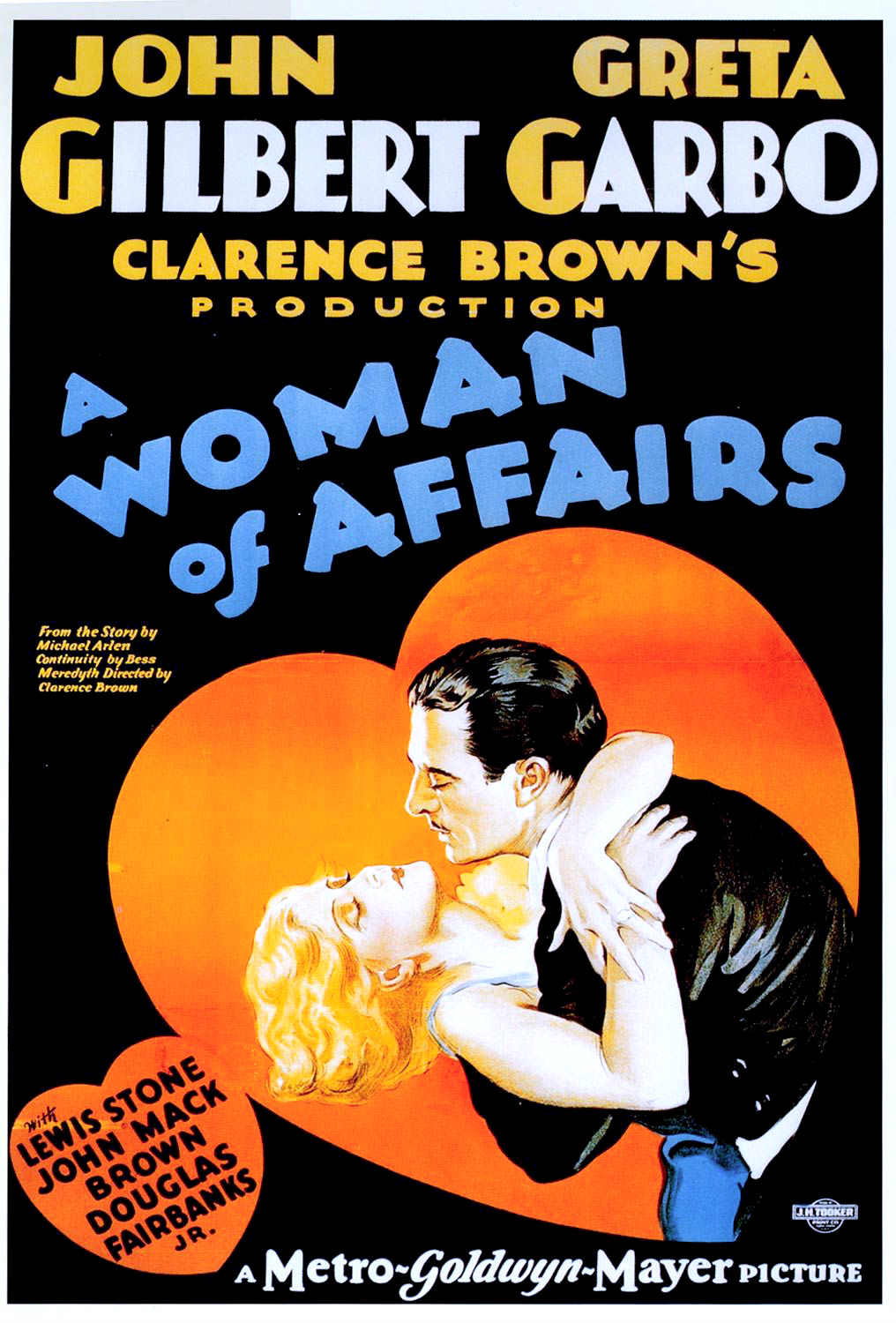
- Film poster
- Directed by: Clarence Brown
- Written by: Bess Meredyth
- Based on: The Green Hat; 1924 novel by Michael Arlen
- Starring: Greta Garbo; John Gilbert; Lewis Stone; Douglas Fairbanks Jr.
- Cinematography: William H. Daniels
- Edited by: Hugh Wynn
- Music by: William Axt (uncredited)
- Distributed by: Metro-Goldwyn-Mayer
- Release date: December 15, 1928
- Running time: 91 minutes (there are indications of 92 and 98 minute copies)
- Country: United States
- Languages: Sound (Synchronized); English Intertitles
- Budget: $328,687.77
- Box office: $1,370,000

A Woman of Affairs is a 1928 Metro-Goldwyn-Mayer synchronized sound drama film directed by Clarence Brown and starring Greta Garbo, John Gilbert, Douglas Fairbanks Jr. and Lewis Stone. While the film has no audible dialog, it was released with a synchronized musical score with sound effects using both the sound-on-disc and sound-on-film process. The film was based on a 1924 best-selling novel by Michael Arlen, The Green Hat, which he adapted as a four-act stage play in 1925. The Green Hat was considered so daring in the United States that the movie did not allow any associations with it and was renamed A Woman of Affairs, with the characters also renamed to mollify the censors. In particular, the film script eliminated all references to heroin use, homosexuality and syphilis that were at the core of the tragedies involved.

Michael Arlen and Bess Meredyth's script was nominated for Best Writing at the 2nd Academy Awards.

In 1934, MGM released a remake of the film titled Outcast Lady starring Constance Bennett.

== Plot ==
A Woman of Affairs (1928)

Diana Merrick, Neville and David were playmates as children, members of the rich British aristocracy. Diana and Neville are in love, but his father opposes the match, disapproving the Merrick family's lifestyle. Neville is sent to Egypt for business purposes and to become wealthy.

Diana, after waiting in vain for two years for Neville's return, finally marries David, who is also in love with her and good friends with her brother Jeffry. During their honeymoon David commits suicide. Diana does not explain the reasons behind her husband's action, except to say, "He died for decency." Jeffry, who was deeply connected to David, blames his sister for his friend's death; he falls deeper into alcohol as his sister starts a reckless life, well-publicized by tabloid-esque publications tracking her numerous affairs.

Years later, Neville returns to England to marry Constance. Jeffry is now gravely ill, and Diana brings Dr. Trevelyan, a family friend, to his bedside and then leaves since Jeffry still refuses to see her. As she starts to drive away, she sees Neville who has followed her and Dr. Trevelyan in a cab. Diana and Neville go to his apartment, realize they are still in love, and spend that one night together. During the night Jeffry dies. Dr. Trevelyan goes to Neville's apartment in the morning to give him the news and discovers that Diana has spent the night there. Three days later, Neville marries Constance.

About nine months go by: Diana falls ill (in the script she is supposed to have suffered a miscarriage, but because of censorship, this couldn't be mentioned) and is visited by Neville. Diana professes her love for him before realizing Constance is in the room. Neville asks Diana for forgiveness and promises that they will be together.

Upon learning of their decision to move to South America Sir Morton sends Diana a letter asking for a meeting so they can talk things over. There he tells her that he's unhappy with the couple because he believes that she is dishonorable and undeserving of his son.

Neville and Constance arrive, mad at his father's rudeness towards Diana he decides to reveal the real reason of David's death, believing that it would sway his father's opinion of Diana. David had been embezzling money for some time, and decided to commit suicide once he realized he was going to be arrested. After that Diana used her own money to reimburse all of his victims, in secrecy, to keep her husband's honor and her brother's memory of him.

Diana is convinced that the only reason Neville decided to be with her isn't because of love but because he finally believes she is honoured. Saddened she decides to break things up by announcing that Constance is pregnant. Amid the furor she leaves.

Constance denies it so they drive out in search for Diana. They find her car overturned after it ran into the tree in front of which she and Neville had fallen in love and sworn eternal fidelity.

== Cast ==
- Greta Garbo as Diana Merrick Furness
- John Gilbert as Neville "Nevs" Holderness
- Lewis Stone as Dr. Hugh Trevelyan
- Johnny Mack Brown as David Furness (as John Mack Brown)
- Douglas Fairbanks Jr. as Jeffry Merrick
- Hobart Bosworth as Sir Morton Holderness
- Dorothy Sebastian as Constance

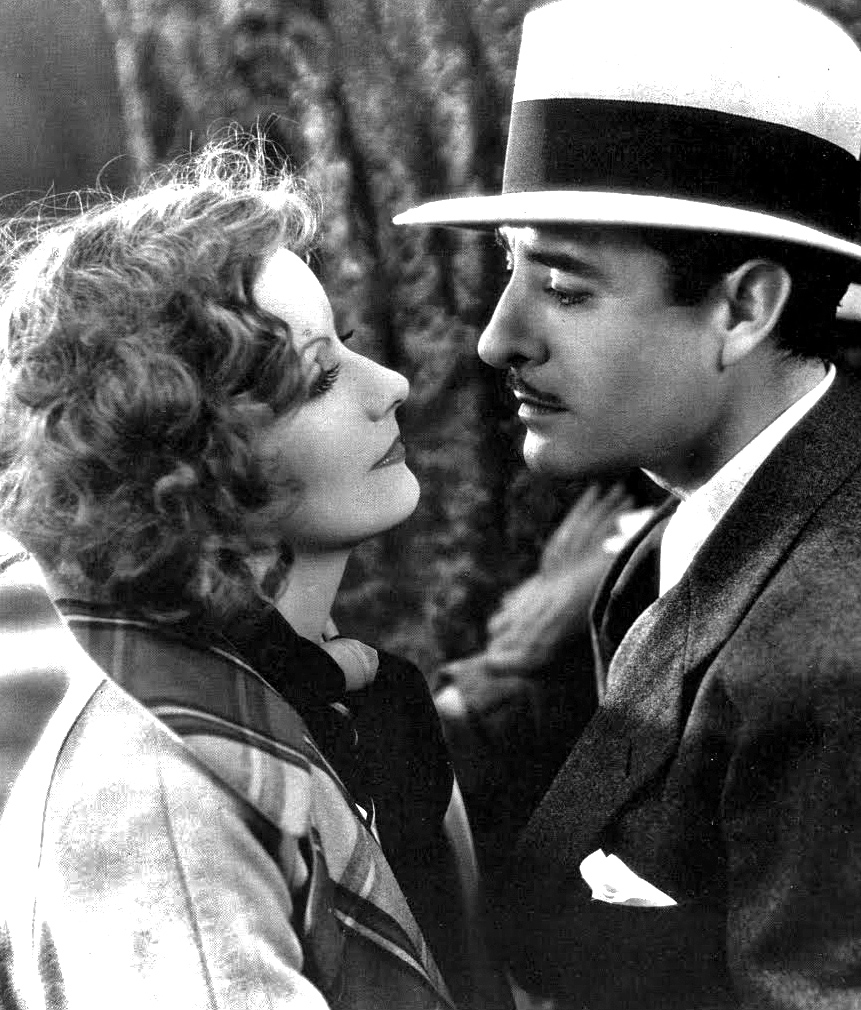
Greta Garbo and John Gilbert in A Woman of Affairs

== Music ==
This film featured a theme song entitled "Love's First Kiss" which was composed by William Axt and David Mendoza.

== Censorship ==
In the popular novel on which the film was based, The Green Hat, David commits suicide because he has syphilis, not because of a criminal background. This critical plot element was excised during scripting by the Hays Commission.

== Reception ==
=== Critical response ===
All Movie Guide provides a rating of three stars.

From Variety, January 23, 1929

A sensational array of screen names, and the intriguing nature of the story (The Green Hat) from which it was made, together with some magnificence in the acting by Greta Garbo, by long odds the best thing she has ever done, will carry through this vague and sterilized version of Michael Arlen's exotic play.... But the kick is out of the material, and, worse yet, John Gilbert, idol of the flappers, has an utterly blah role. Most of the footage he just stands around, rather sheepishly, in fact, while others shape the events. At this performance (the second of the Saturday opening), whole groups of women customers audibly expressed their discontent with the proceedings. ... Miss Garbo saves an unfortunate situation throughout by a subtle something in her playing that suggests just the exotic note that is essential to the whole theme and story. Without her eloquent acting the picture would go to pieces.

From The New York Times, January 21, 1929

Not only is the narrative translated with changes only where it was obviously necessary to circumvent censorial frowns, but Miss Garbo gives a most intelligent and fascinating impersonation of that "sad lady" ... Mr. Gilbert does nicely as the man with whom Diana is madly in love ... Except for his penchant for flashes of symbolism, Clarence Brown has handled this production imaginatively and resourcefully. The story is never confused, and while the reason for all the trouble may at times be somewhat incredible, the scenes are invariably beautifully photographed and admirably constructed.

From Judge (text by Pare Lorentz)

The most interesting feature of A Woman of Affairs is the treatment accorded it by the censors. As is obvious, the story was adapted from Michael Arlen's best seller, The Green Hat, and, as every reader of that Hispano-Suiza advertisement will recollect, the heroine's white feather was borne for the proud fact that her suicide husband suffered from an ailment enjoyed by some of our most popular kings, prelates and prize-fighters. Well, sir, Bishop Hays changes that to "embezzlement". And, for some strange reason, instead of using the word "purity" (the boy died for purity, according to Iris March) they substituted the oft-repeated word "decency". To anyone who can show me why "purity" is a more immoral word than "decency", I'll gladly send an eighty-five cent Paramount ticket, to be used at your own risk. Outside of its purification, the movie is a good dramatization of the novel and for the first time I respected the performance of Greta Garbo. She shuffled through the long, melancholy and sometimes beautiful scenes with more grace and sincerity than I have ever before observed, and the fact that she rode down and practically eliminated John Gilbert's goggling is in itself grounds for recommendation. Another indifferent performer, Douglas Fairbanks, Jr., suddenly snapped to life under the guidance of Director Brown, and gave a splendid performance. Lewis Stone made his usual calm and reserved appearance and, even with its melancholy apathy, you will find A Woman of Affairs worth seeing.

=== Box office ===
The film was a hit, garnering receipts of $1,370,000 ($850,000 in the US and $520,000 abroad), against a budget of $383,000. It was one of the top 20 box office films of 1929. It brought in a profit of $417,000.

== Home media ==
A Laserdisc edition was released on October 12, 1992, by MGM/UA as part of MGM's Silent Classics series and a VHS release of the film was made in the USA on September 1, 1998 (NTSC format). The film was made available on DVD through the Warner Archive Collection on March 5, 2019.

== See also ==
- List of early sound feature films (1926–1929)
