= César Baldaccini =

French sculptor (1921–1998)

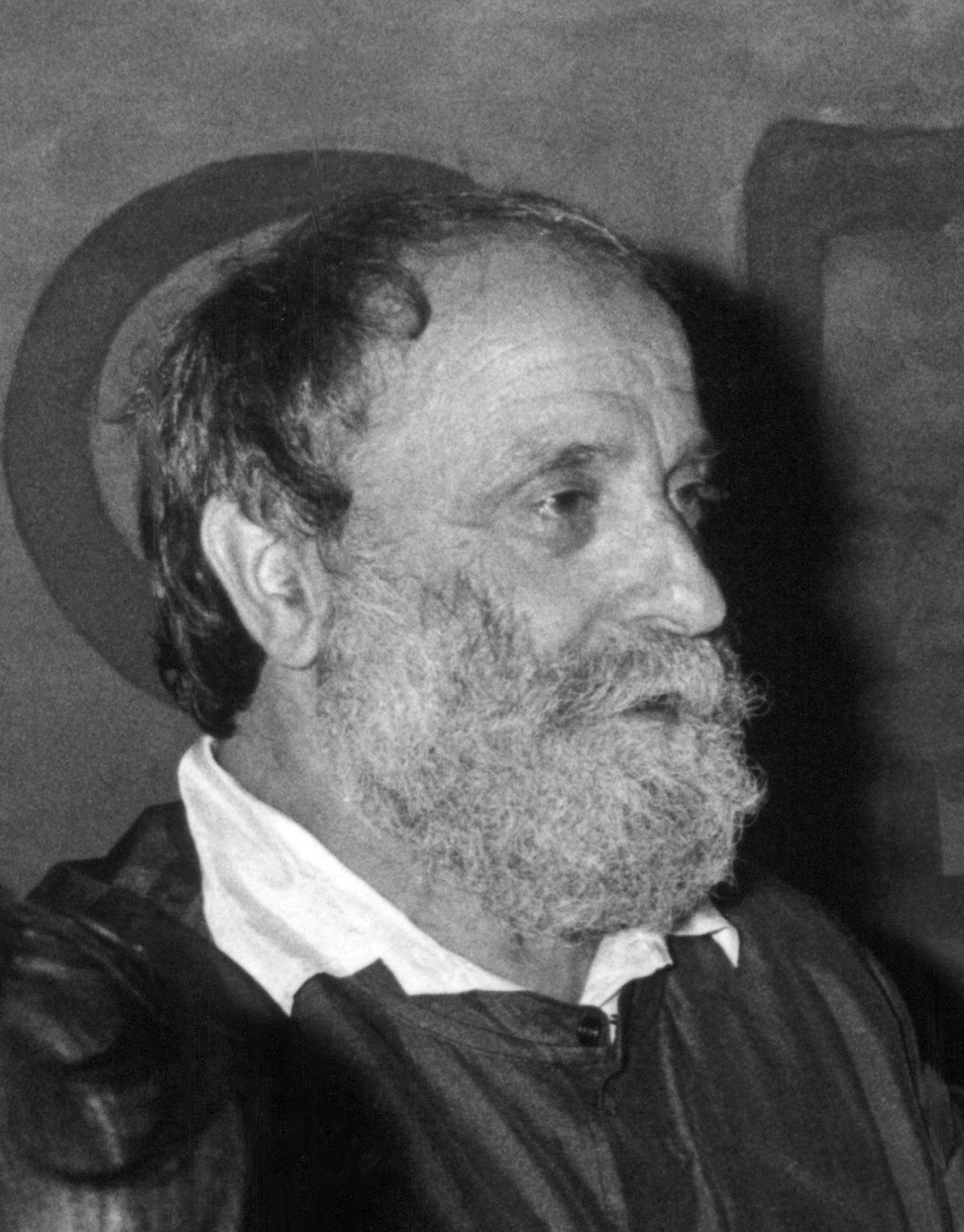
- Born: Cesare Baldaccini; 1 January 1921; Marseille, France
- Died: 6 December 1998 (aged 77); Paris, France
- Known for: Sculpting
- Awards: Praemium Imperiale(1996)

Grave of Baldaccini in Montparnasse cemetery, Paris, incorporating one of his sculptures

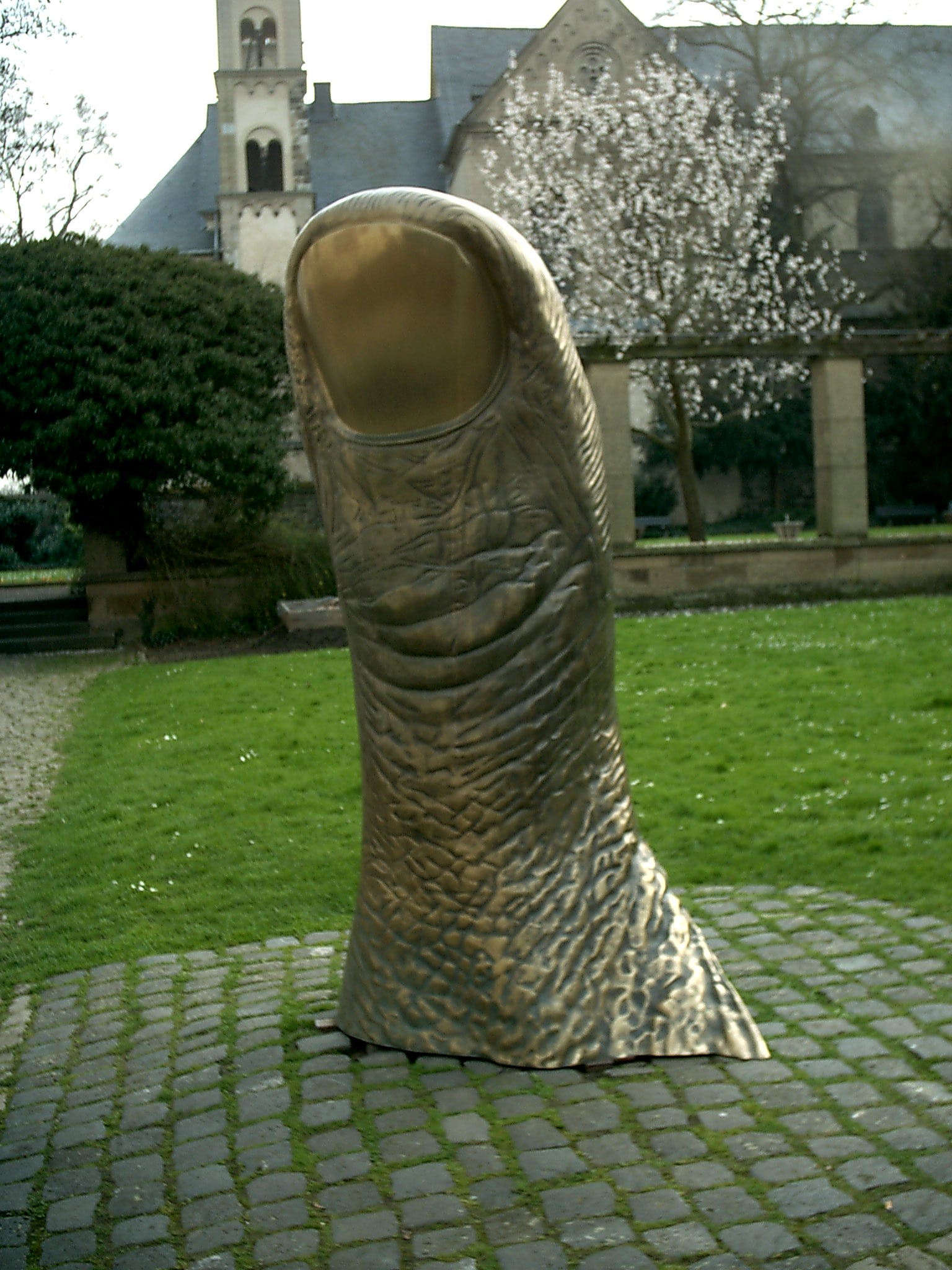
Le pouce

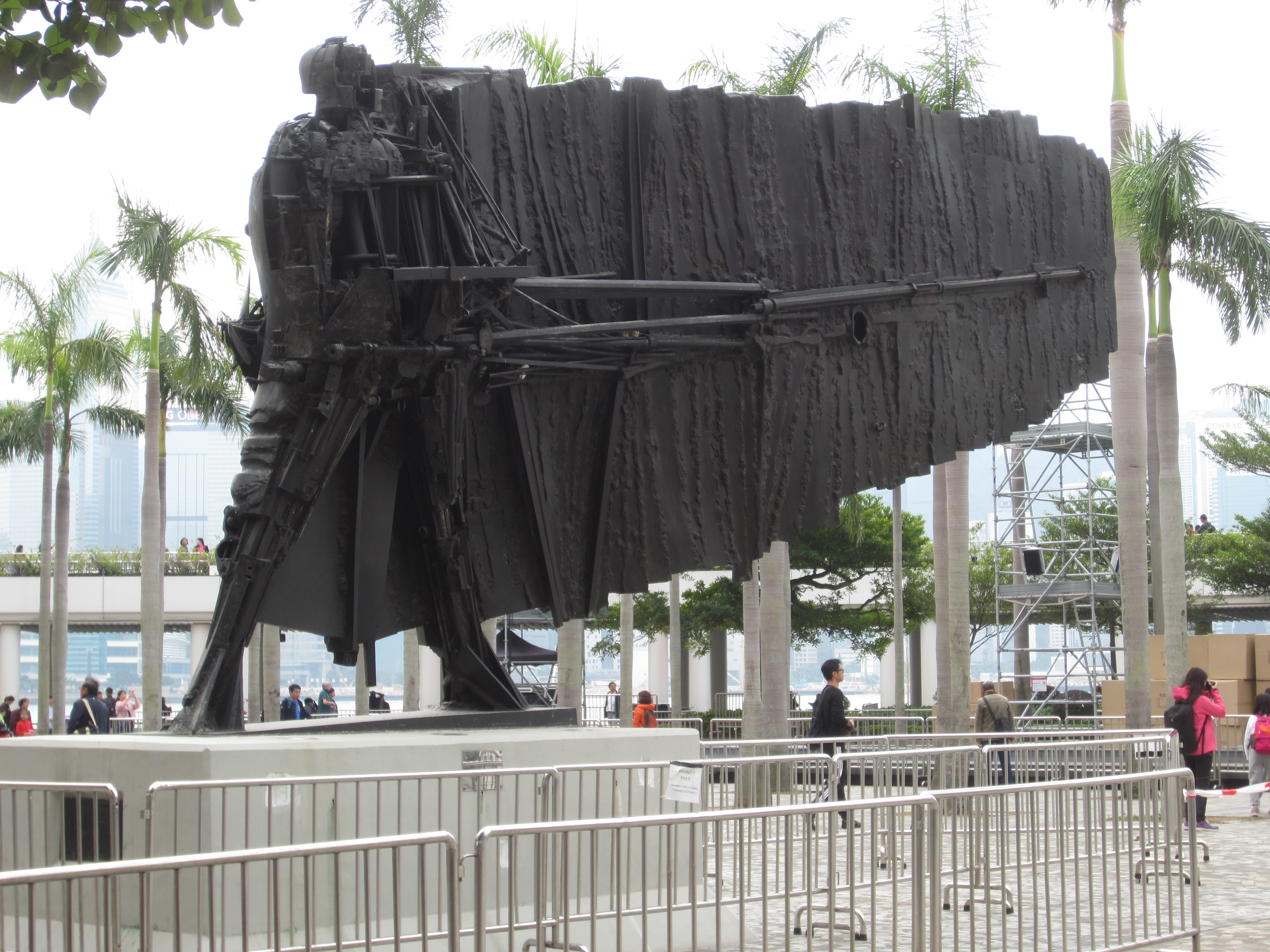
The Flying Frenchman in Hong Kong

César (born Cesare Baldaccini; 1 January 1921 – 6 December 1998), also occasionally referred to as César Baldaccini ([sezaʁ baldatʃini]), was a French sculptor.

César was at the forefront of the Nouveau réalisme movement with his radical compressions (compacted automobiles, discarded metal, or rubbish), expansions (polyurethane foam sculptures), and fantastic representations of animals and insects.

== Biography ==
He was a French sculptor, born in 1921 to Italian parents from Tuscany in the working-class neighbourhood of la Belle-de-Mai in Marseille. His father was a cooper and bar owner. After studying at the Ecole des Beaux-Arts, Marseille (1935–1939) he went on to the Ecole des Beaux-Arts in Paris (1943–1948). He began making sculptures by welding together pieces of scrap metal in 1952 and first made his reputation with solid welded sculptures of insects, various kinds of animals and nudes.

His first one-man exhibition was at the Galerie Lucien Durand, Paris, 1954.

His early work used soldered and welded metal as well as junk materials, and by 1960 César was considered one of France's leading sculptors. In that year, on a visit to a scrap merchant in search of metal, he saw a hydraulic crushing machine in operation, and decided to experiment with it in his sculpture. He astonished his followers by showing three crushed cars at a Paris exhibition. It was for these 'Compressions' that César became renowned. César selected particular cars for crushing, mixing elements from differently coloured vehicles. In this way he could control the surface pattern and colour scheme of the piece.

Later the same year he joined the Nouveaux Réalistes (New Realists) – Arman, Klein, Raysse, Tinguely, Pierre Restany and others who found their inspiration in urban life.

In 1965, he started to work with plastics, first with plastic moulds of human imprints, then from 1966 by pouring expanded polyurethane, which was allowed to expand and solidify. He gave up making welded-metal sculpture in 1966 and organised a series of Happenings from 1967 to 1970, in which he produced expansions in the presence of an audience. His later works also included sculptures made out of molten crystal.

In 1995, he was asked to paint a McLaren F1 GTR that participated in the famous 24 Hours of Le Mans. The car Chassis GTR5 is still in the livery created by César, and represents the only 'Art Car" based on the iconic Mclaren.

He is the creator of the César du cinéma trophy, which is awarded to the best in French cinema.

He was made Chevalier (Knight) of the Légion d'honneur on 22 January 1978 and promoted Officier (Officer) in 1993.

He married Rosine and had one daughter.

He died in Paris in December 1998. Following his death there was an extended dispute over his will between his widow and daughter on the one hand and Stéphanie Busuttil, his companion at the time of his death, on the other.

== Works on public display ==
Examples of César's work can be seen in the permanent collection of le Centre national d'art et de culture Georges-Pompidou (Bas relief, Tortue, le Diable) and the Musée d'art moderne de la Ville de Paris (Facel Véga). He also designed his own grave at the Montparnasse Cemetery, on the esplanade de La Défense (Le Pouce), in Marseille on the avenue de Hambourg near the MAC and the Bonneveine Centre (Le Pouce Géant).

One of his most iconic pieces, Conserve expansion - Martial Raysse (1970-1972), is at the Museo Cantonale d'Arte in Lugano.

The Flying Frenchman was installed in Hong Kong in the early 1990s.

== Sources ==
- Ronald Alley, Catalogue of the Tate Gallery's Collection of Modern Art other than Works by British Artists, Tate Gallery and Sotheby Parke-Bernet, London 1981, p. 99.
- Le Monde, 12 January 2008
