= Frying Dutchman =

Frying Dutchman may refer to:

- The Frying Dutchman, a recurring location in the animated TV series The Simpsons
- Frying Dutchman, an anti-nuclear group in Japan

== See also ==
- Flying Dutchman (disambiguation)
