= The Green Hat (play) =

Play by Michael Arlen

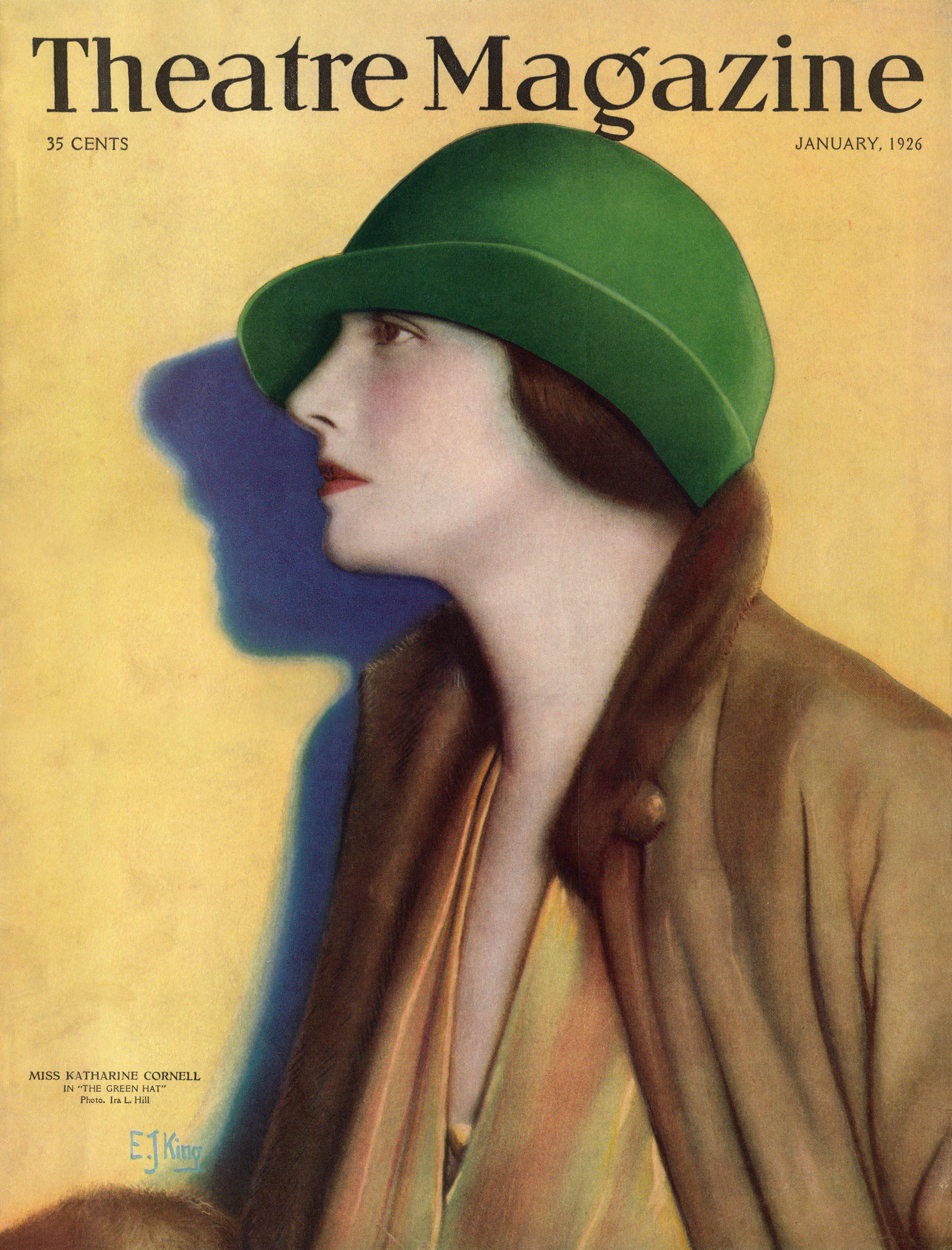
- Katharine Cornell in The Green Hat
- Original language: English
- Written by: Michael Arlen
- Based on: The Green Hat by Michael Arlen
- Subject: "Decency when no one is watching"
- Genre: Drama
- Setting: Hotel Vendome 1913; Mayfair apartment 1923; Nursing home, Paris; Harpenden Country House

Premiere
- Date: September 2, 1925 (UK); September 15, 1925 (US)
- Place: Adelphi Theatre (UK); Broadhurst Theatre (US)
- Directed by: Nigel Playfair (UK); Guthrie McClintic (US)

The Green Hat is a 1925 play adapted by Michael Arlen from his 1924 novel of the same name. It is a four-act drama, with four settings, and seventeen speaking characters. The action of the play spans twelve years time. The story concerns a young woman thwarted of her true love who wreaks havoc on herself by trying to preserve an illusion for someone else's sake.

The play had separate productions in the UK and the US that premiered in the West End and on Broadway within two weeks of each other. A. H. Woods produced and Guthrie McClintic staged the US version, with sets by P. Dodd Ackerman and costumes by Margaret Pemberton. The play starred Katharine Cornell and Leslie Howard. It first opened in Detroit in late March 1925, and played Chicago from April through July 1925. After a brief hiatus, the production had two tryouts in New Jersey, then premiered on Broadway during September 1925, where it ran through to April 1926. Burns Mantle included it with The Best Plays of 1925-26.

For the UK, The Green Hat was produced and staged by Nigel Playfair, with sets by Hamza Abdullah Carr. It premiered in the West End during September 1925, starring Tallulah Bankhead and Leonard Upton. This production ran for fifteen weeks, winding up in December 1925.

== Characters ==
Characters are listed in order of appearance within their scope for the US production.

Lead

- Napier Harpenden is 20 at play's start, handsome and serious, a childhood friend of Iris and Gerald.
- Iris March Fenwick is 20 at play's start, fey and dark-haired, from the family known as the Rotten Marches.

Supporting

- Dr. Conrad Masters is a doctor for English-speaking patients in France.
- Gerald March is Iris' twin brother, a borderline alcoholic who idolized "Boy" Fenwick.
- Sir Maurice Harpenden, Bart is Napier's father, a retired Major General who forbade him to marry Iris.
- Hilary Townshend is an old gray-haired friend of the Harpenden and March families.
- Venice Pollen is a wealthy blonde girl, some years younger than Napier but clear-eyed and knowing.

Featured

- An English Reporter sneaks into the suite at Hotel Vendome, investigating news of Fenwick's death.
- Manager of Hotel Monsieur Cavelle is the anxious proprietor for the Hotel Vendome in Deauville.
- Lord Guy De Travest is a neighbor and friend of Sir Maurice.
- A Lady is a guest at the dinner party in Mayfair.
- Sister Virginia is at the nursing home in Paris.
- Truble is the elderly butler at the Harpenden's country home, a friend to Iris.

Bit players

- A Ladies Maid, Turner (valet), Sister Clothilde, Madelaine (nun).

Discarded after opening engagements

- An American Reporter, Shirley St. George, A French Doctor

== Synopsis ==
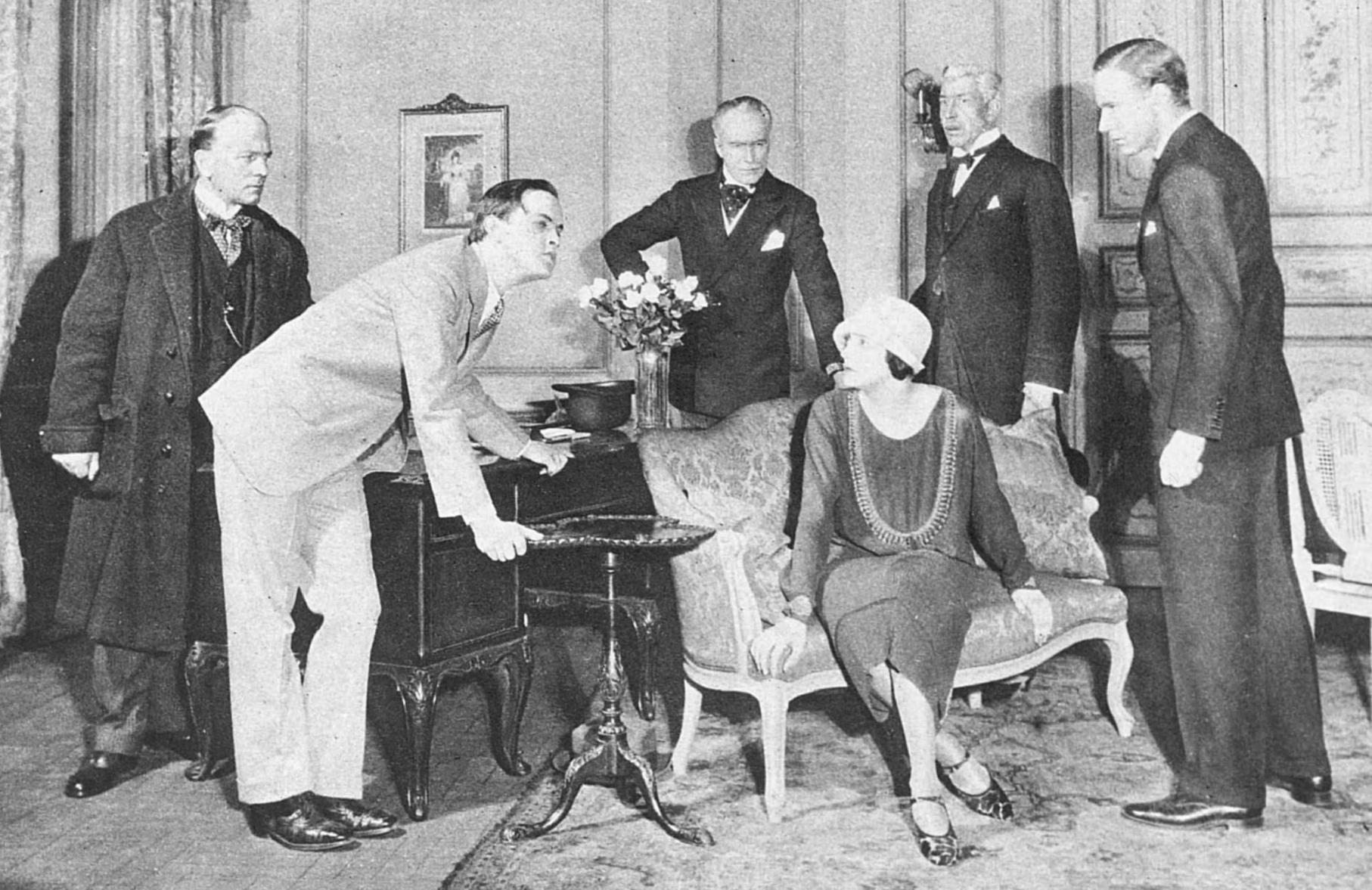

Act I (Third floor suite at Hotel Vendome, Deauville. Summer 1913, late afternoon.) "Boy" Fenwick fell to his death on his wedding night with Iris. The next day, Dr. Conrad Masters remonstrates with Monsieur Cavelle. The doctor was on vacation in the hotel; his practice is in Paris, and he has never seen Fenwick or Iris before. Gerald March bursts in, behaving wildly, full of questions and accusations. He is followed by Napier and Sir Maurice Harpenden, and Hilary Townshend. Dr. Masters tries to paint Fenwick's death as accident, but Iris says it was suicide. When Gerald demands to know why, Iris says he died for purity. Gerald thinks she refers to her own lack, and agrees Fenwick would have died for that principle. Napier is deeply disillusioned with Iris; it is just two years since they sought to marry and were stymied by Sir Maurice, but it appears she has already taken lovers. Gerald accuses his sister of harlotry, but when Dr. Masters, who has examined Fenwick's body tries to speak, she stops him. When the others leave, Napier and Masters remain with Iris. Napier tries to understand Iris' behavior. She explains it is for decency, not the sort he understands, but the "decency when no one is watching". Later, alone with Dr. Masters, she acknowledges his reproach: the marriage was not, could not, have been consummated. When he asks why she has ruined herself by lying, she again repeats for decency. (Curtain)

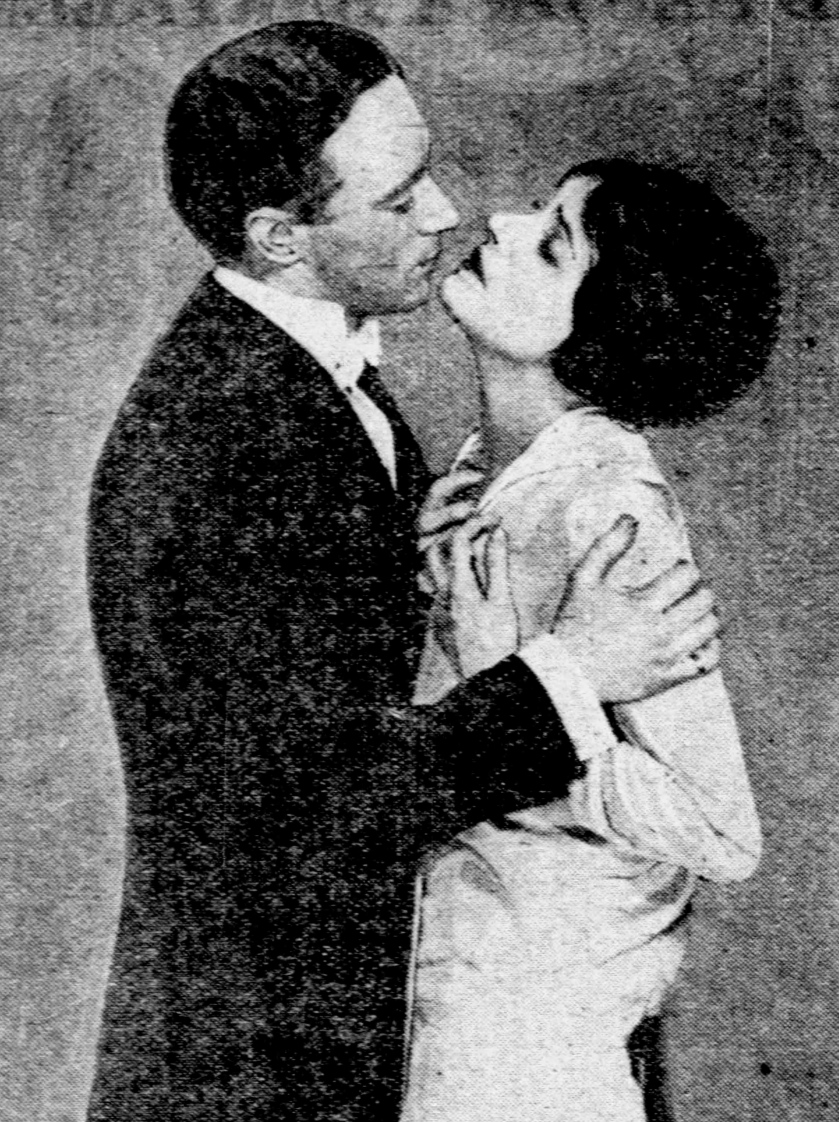

Act II (Napier's Mayfair bachelor apartment. 1923, evening.) Napier earned a DSO during the Great War, and is now at the Foreign Office. A small dinner party to celebrate the engagement of Napier and Venice Pollen is just ending. Hilary Townshend and Sir Maurice are there with others. Venice presses Napier for some assurance of the depth of his love for her. The other guests speak of Gerald March, rumored to be dying of drink in squalid circumstances. Of Iris Fenwick they whisper about her rumored affairs in Paris and on the Riviera, racing about in her yellow Hispano-Suiza. When all have left except Hilary Townshend, Turner announces a lady who gives no name, but came in a yellow car and wears a green hat. Iris has heard of Gerald's illness, but he refuses to see her. Napier too, is banned from Gerald's presence, so Hilary is sent out. He is reluctant to leave them, but goes. Alone, Iris and Napier speak of their love since they were playmates. Napier is ashamed of desiring her still, while Iris confesses her indulgences in desire without love. Unable to resist, they embrace and turn out the light. (Quick curtain, to denote passage of two hours.) Hilary returns and turns on the light. As Napier comes into the room, Hilary tells him of Gerald's death. He sees the green hat lying on the sofa and knows what has happened. He excoriates Napier for his loss of honor in betraying Venice. Iris has heard and comes in, saddened about Gerald but wondering if he has now escaped the family curse. Hilary argues with both of them: they must part and never see each other, for the sake of Venice. Iris sadly goes. (Curtain)

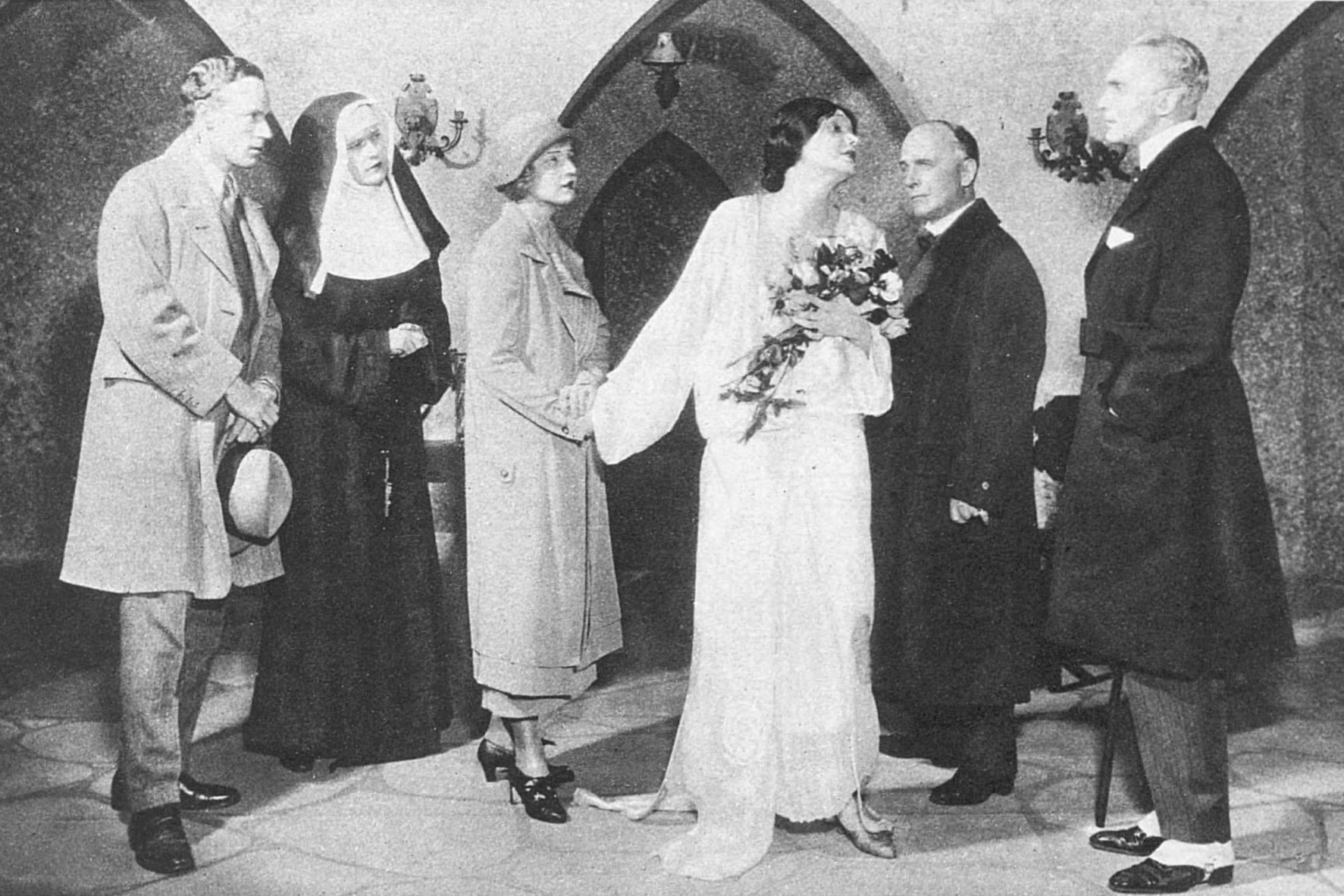

Act III (Convent-nursing home, Paris. Nine months later.) Dr. Masters discusses Iris Fenwick's condition with Sister Virginia. Iris needs sleep, but will not sleep; she waits for someone and hugs a newly-arrived bunch of roses. Dr. Masters tells Hilary he cannot see Iris, who is recovering from septic poisoning following the death of her newborn child. The doctor laments she does not want to live, so he wired Napier in London to come over, for he is all she talks about. Hilary is stunned; he explains Napier has been married for many months, but the doctor is only concerned for his patient. Napier arrives with Venice, who is confused by his concern. "Who is Mrs. Fenwick to him?" she asks Hilary. From Hilary's evasiveness she realizes Napier and Iris are more than old friends. Iris staggers out of her room, dressed in hospital robes. A nun has taken her roses and she wants them back. Seeing Napier she gives a glad cry, but halts when she sees Venice behind him. Despite her disheveled condition, Venice can sense the power of her attraction for Napier. Iris and Napier make a show of being old childhood playmates for Venice. Dr. Masters is complicit with Iris, telling Napier her trouble is ptomaine poisoning. Iris tells Venice she will have children for Napier, but breaks down sobbing. Sister Virginia and Venice help Iris back to her room, with Dr. Masters following. Alone with Napier, Hilary asks him "Why did you bring her?" Napier explains he will not do anything behind her back, to which Hilary says "You're too noble, boy-- at the wrong moment." But Dr. Masters is satisfied; the flare-up has restored Iris' will to live. (Curtain)

Act IV (Library at Sutton-Marle, the Harpenden country house. Four months later.) Sir Maurice has invited Guy De Travest and Hilary to join him in speaking with Iris. Rumor says she is about to run away with Napier, who has confirmed it. They will go to South America the next day. Venice has acquiesced to the scheme, having no desire to keep Napier against his will. Sir Maurice and the other two men, who have known Iris from childhood, will appeal to her to let Napier go. Iris arrives unannounced through the French window of the library, courtesy of Truble. She parries their arguments and tells them of her dead child who was also Napier's. But she does not want Napier out of obligation so she suggests they do not tell him. Sir Maurice appeals to her on their shared family background, an argument she rejects though it frays her nerves. She blames Sir Maurice for her unhappiness, and despises his idea of success for Napier: "The kind of success you respect is like a murky sponge wiping out the lines of a man's character". Sir Maurice hurls Boy Fenwick's death at Iris, but Napier enters to defend her. He reveals Fenwick committed suicide because he suffered from a venereal disease that rendered him impotent, a disease he caught from patronizing whores. Iris is aghast that Napier has revealed the secret, destroying her act of decency, even though Gerald, who adored Fenwick, is already dead. Iris and Napier hurry out to the cars, while Venice, who has come down with Napier enters the library. Napier comes back and tells Venice he will not desert her now. Venice is puzzled until Napier explains Iris has revealed Venice's pregnancy. But she is not pregnant; Iris has lied, to stop Napier from going with her. From the library window they all watch as Iris drives her sports car straight into a large oak tree and dies. Venice and Napier must now reconcile themselves to the shadow that hangs between them. (Curtain)

== Original productions ==
=== Background ===
Michael Arlen's novel The Green Hat was published in both the UK and the US during 1924. It was a sensation and a best seller, prompting him to adapt it for the stage starting in October 1924. Being a well-known figure in Mayfair at the time, he was forced to take alternate lodgings in order to work on the dramatization undisturbed. He later claimed to have spent only three weeks adapting The Green Hat, and by late November 1924 had sold the North American rights to produce it to A. H. Woods. A. H. Woods immediately secured the loan of Katharine Cornell from her manager David Belasco for the lead. Guthrie McClintic was signed to stage the play in January 1925. Settings for the US production were designed by P. Dodd Ackerman, and costumes by Mrs. Margaret Pemberton.

The UK rights for production were initially taken up by Gerald du Maurier in December 1924, with Gladys Cooper, who early on had expressed interest in the character of Iris, as the lead. However, later that same month New York columnist Bernadine Szold reported that Tallulah Bankhead, a frequent companion of Michael Arlen at Mayfair nightclubs, was going to play Iris in the UK production. Not until July 1925 was it announced that the UK production of The Green Hat would be premiered at the Adelphi Theatre in September, with Tallulah Bankhead in the lead. Michael Arlen spent two weeks in August 1925 working with Nigel Playfair in rehearsals before returning to New York.

=== US Cast ===
Principals from the opening engagements through the Broadway run. Production was on hiatus from July 19 through August 30, 1925.
Role	Actor	Dates	Notes and sources
Napier Harpenden	Leslie Howard	Mar 29, 1925 - Apr 03, 1926	
Iris Fenwick	Katharine Cornell	Mar 29, 1925 - Apr 03, 1926	Cornell was under contract to David Belasco, who lent her out for this production.
Dr. Conrad Masters	A. P. Kaye	Mar 29, 1925 - Apr 03, 1926	
Gerald March	Paul Guilfoyle	Mar 29, 1925 - Apr 03, 1926	
Sir Maurice Harpenden	Eugene Powers	Mar 29, 1925 - Apr 03, 1926	
Hilary Townshend	Gordon Ash	Mar 29, 1925 - Apr 03, 1926	Ash was an English actor who had been performing in the US for the past five years.
Venice Pollen	Ann Harding	Mar 29, 1925 - Jun 13, 1925	Producer A. H. Woods shifted Harding to a tryout for The School Mistress. (Note: This was not the farce by Pinero, but a new adaptation of an Italian play.)
Venice Pollen	Selena Royle	Jun 14, 1925 - Jul 18, 1925	Royle relaced Harding, who at the time was expected to return for Broadway.
Venice Pollen	Margalo Gillmore	Aug 31, 1925 - Apr 03, 1926	
An English Reporter	John Buckler	Mar 29, 1925 - Apr 03, 1926	
Manager of Hotel	Gustave Rolland	Mar 29, 1925 - Apr 03, 1926	
Lord Guy De Travest	Wallace Widdicombe	Mar 29, 1925 - Apr 11, 1925	
Lord Guy De Travest	John Redmond	Apr 12, 1925 - Apr 03, 1926	
A Lady	Tonie Bruce	Jul 13, 1925 - Jul 18, 1925	This role was created during the Chicago engagement.
A Lady	Jane Saville	Aug 31, 1925 - Apr 03, 1926	
Sister Virginia	Adi Orane	Mar 29, 1925 - Jul 18, 1925	
Sister Virginia	Gwyneth Gordon	Aug 31, 1925 - Apr 03, 1926	
Truble	Harry Barfoot	Mar 29, 1925 - Apr 03, 1926	
An American Reporter	Worthington Miner	Mar 29, 1925 - Jul 18, 1925	This role was eliminated before the New Jersey engagements.
Shirley St. George	Barbara Allen	Mar 29, 1925 - Jul 11, 1925	This role was eliminated during the Chicago engagement.
A French Doctor	Pierre La Ferte	Mar 29, 1925 - Jul 18, 1925	This role was reduced to a non-speaking walk-on for the New Jersey and Broadway engagements.

=== US opening engagements ===
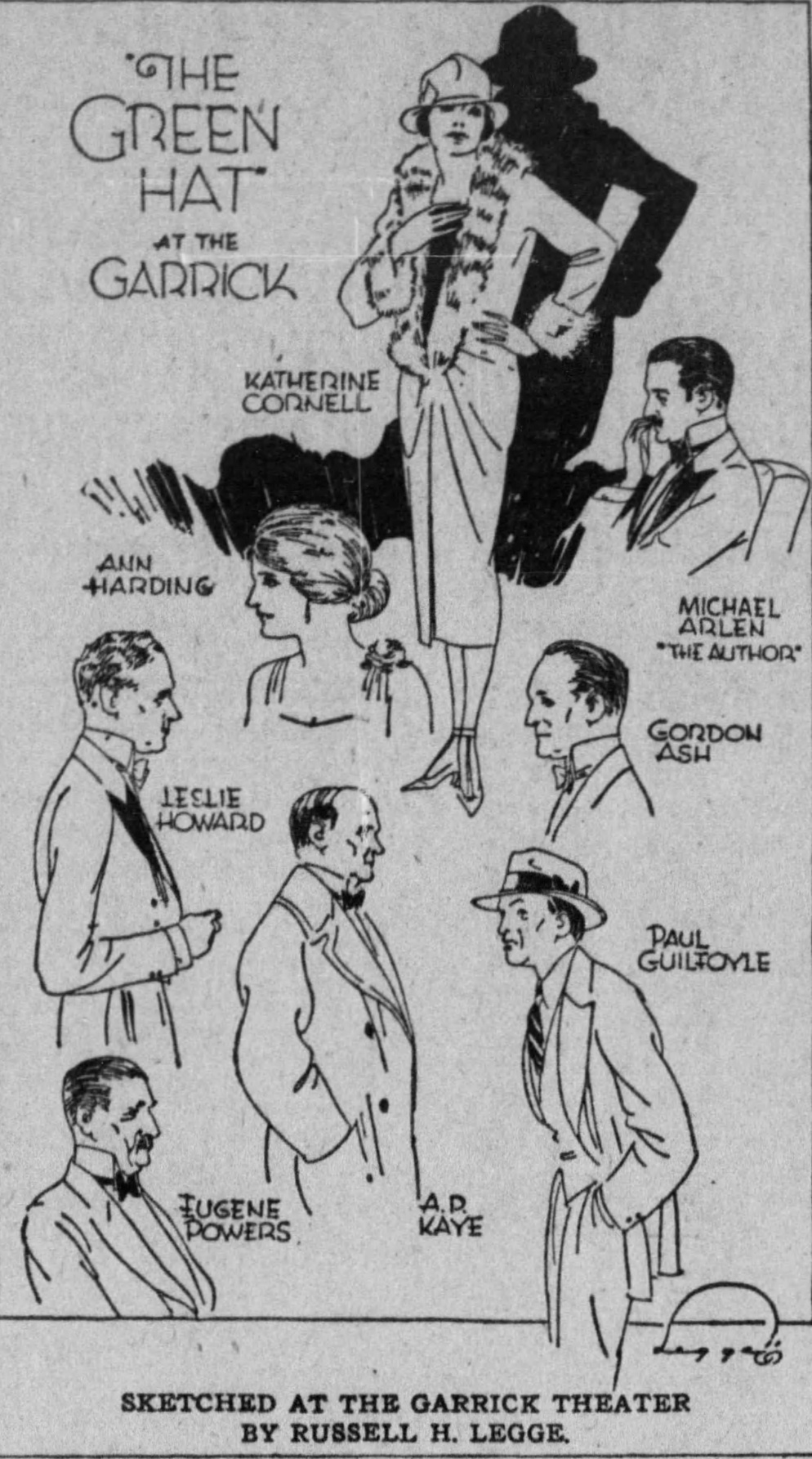

The first performance of The Green Hat came at the Garrick Theatre in Detroit on March 29, 1925. Reviewer Len G. Shaw said the play was "a well knit drama that holds attention from the first moment", and that "There seems to be little need of the cutting that usually follows a premiere". Shaw divided the acting honors between Katharine Cornell, Leslie Howard, and Paul Guilfoyle as Gerald March, and noted that Ann Harding as Venice Pollen really had little to do. Originally scheduled for one week, producer A. H. Woods was persuaded by the Garrick Theatre's management to extend the visit by another week. Woods also asked Michael Arlen to write additional material for the part of Venice Pollen. The Green Hat closed in Detroit on April 11, 1925.

The production moved to the Selwyn Theatre in Chicago, starting Sunday, April 12, 1925. Critic Frederick Donaghey focused on the changes Michael Arlen made to adapt his story to the stage, including starting at Fenwick's suicide, subsuming the book's narrator and Guy De Travest into the character of Hilary Townshend, and having Iris fight back against Sir Maurice. The excision of the "Englishry" that was the book's appeal for him led Donaghey to sour on the play, and even minimize Katharine Cornell's performance. During June 1925, Ann Harding was replaced by Selena Royle as Venice Pollen, so the former could go into another play, while the production itself changed venues from the Selwyn Theatre to the Chicago Adelphi Theatre. Towards the end of the Chicago run, the character of Shirley St. George was dropped from the cast list, to be replaced by a part called simply A Lady. The play closed in Chicago on July 18, 1925.

=== US hiatus and tryouts ===
There followed a seven-week hiatus, during which some rewriting and recasting for The Green Hat occurred. The part of the American Reporter was dropped, the French Doctor was reduced to a non-speaking walk-on, some minor parts were recast, but the major change was bringing in Margalo Gillmore to play Venice Pollen. Producer A. H. Woods had decided to keep Ann Harding in The School Mistress. Amidst reports of a high asking price for the movie rights, the Hays Office ruled in August 1925 there would be no film version of The Green Hat. (Note: MGM got around this prohibition by changing the title and renaming the characters for its 1928 movie A Woman of Affairs. This film adaptation by Bess Meredyth went back to the original novel for its scenario.)

The revised Green Hat had its first tryout on August 31, 1925 at Nixon's Apollo Theatre in Atlantic City, New Jersey. Local reviewer Mort Eiseman warned readers of the play's raw subject matter but predicted a long run in New York. He praised the acting of Katharine Cornell, Leslie Howard, and Paul Guilfoyle, while noting Margalo Gillmore had little to do. After a week, the production moved to Asbury Park, New Jersey for its second tryout, at Walter Reade's Main Street Theatre, for a two-day stand. Max D. Davidson, a local critic, reported "Late comers, the noise of Labor Day trains and automobile horns, humidity and the heat of the crowd all failed to distract a packed house from the stage", though it did distract him from mentioning the theatre's name. He also said that had he not read the novel, he would have been confused by the rapid moving first act, and that the green hat itself played no real part in the play.

=== Broadway premiere and reception ===
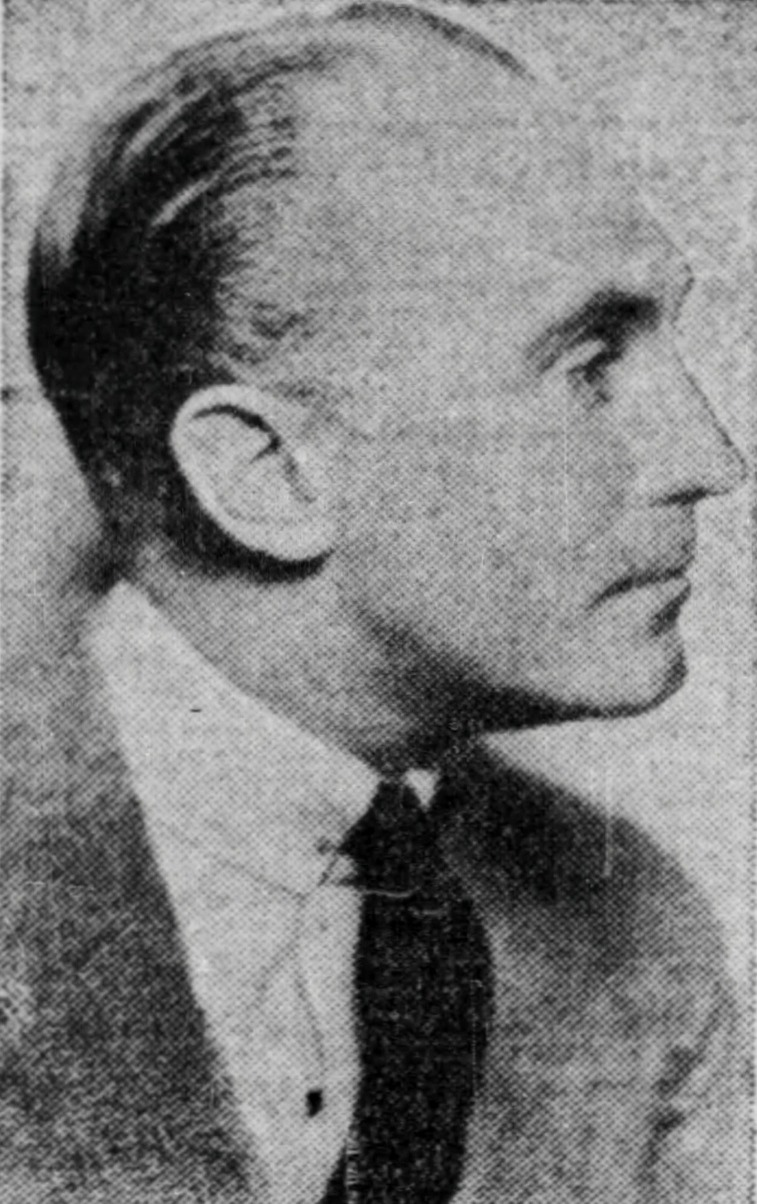
Gordon Ash

The Green Hat had its Broadway premiere on September 15, 1925, at the Broadhurst Theatre. The critic for The New York Times thought the novel had been transferred to the stage "without losing much of the original romance". Katharine Cornell was "perfectly cast" and aroused the audience's sympathy for the character of Iris, while Leslie Howard "ably played" Napier. They also noted the increased emphasis on Gordon Ash's character in the play: "Hilary Townshend... runs through the drama as a sort of moral standard against which the various incidents are measured".

“This Michael Arlen has proved a great joy to his reading contemporaries, who are, most of them, not in a position to sin with grace and charm, but like to see others so conduct their sinning. He is enormously articulate, having the skill to put into words and deeds the day dreams of the rest of us.” – Arthur Pollock on The Green Hat

Burns Mantle said that up to the beginning of the third act, he thought the play would run for years, but the final two acts rendered it a more commonplace theatrical effort. He was prescient in guessing it would last barely a season. He devoted most performing praise to Katharine Cornell, slighting Leslie Howard by misidentifying him as "Sidney". Arthur Pollock, however, felt Leslie Howard was the only cast member who got his part "exactly right", despite the weakness of his fourth act speeches exonerating Iris. Pollock thought Ethel Barrymore could have made more of Iris than Katharine Cornell did, and said Paul Guilfoyle and A. P. Kaye were "satisfactory".

=== Broadway closing ===
The Green Hat finished its Broadway run at the Broadhurst Theatre on Saturday, April 3, 1926, after 231 performances. (Note: This includes 229 performances as listed in the New York Daily News feature "The Golden Dozen", plus the matinee and evening shows for that last day.) Burns Mantle included The Green Hat in his annual The Best Plays of 1925-26, offering an excuse for not including it in the previous year's volume.

== West End premiere and reception ==
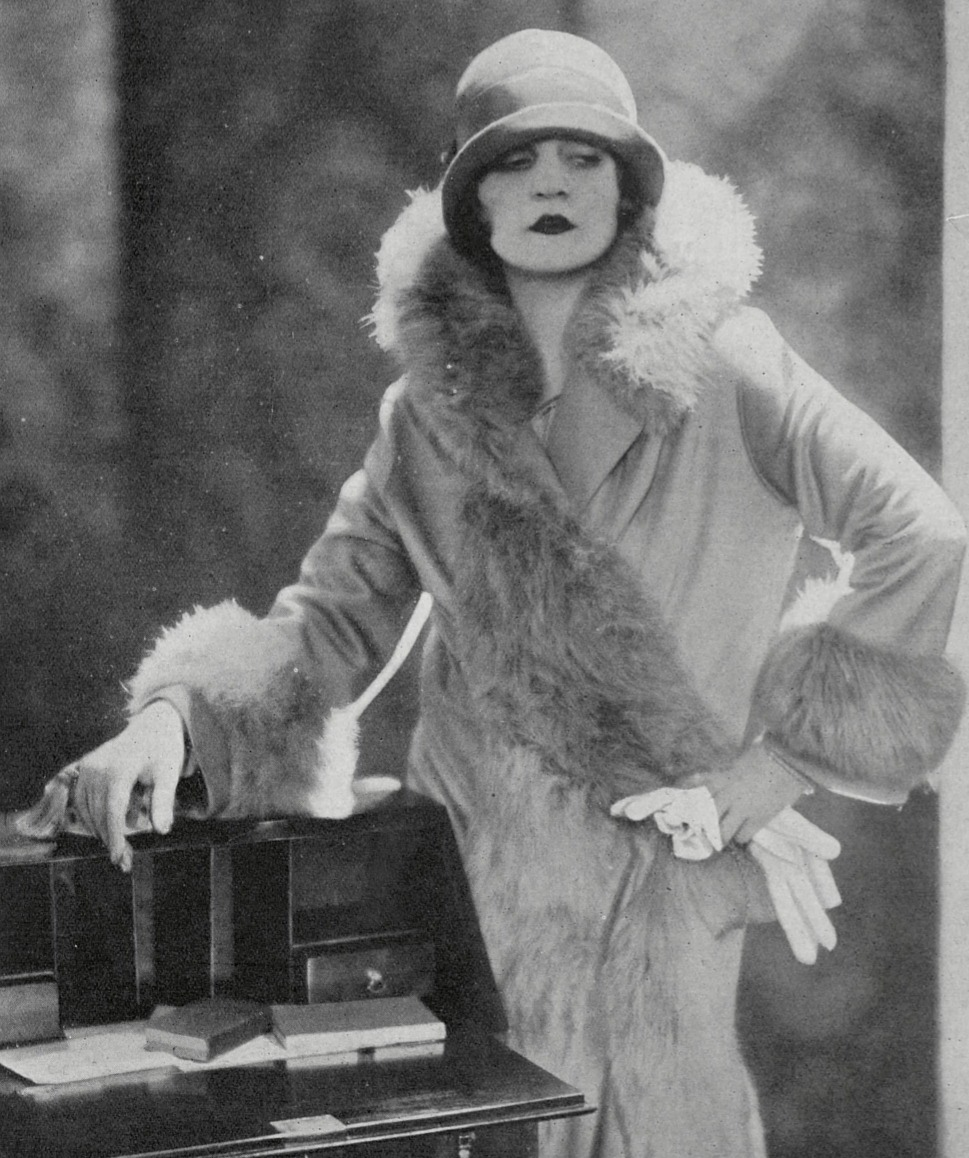

The Green Hat, after engagements in Detroit and Chicago, premiered in the West End two weeks before debuting on Broadway. The play opened at the Adelphi Theatre on September 2, 1925, starring Tallulah Bankhead and Leonard Upton. Nigel Playfair produced and staged it, with the assistance of Michael Arlen. The sets were designed by Hamza Abdullah Carr. Supporting players included Eric Maturin as Gerald March, Julian Royce as Hilary Townshend, Norman McKinnel as Sir Maurice, Frederick Leister as Dr. Masters, and Barbara Dillon as Venice Pollen. The reviewer for The Daily Telegraph thought the playwright had done better than expected in adapting the novel, creating a concise and compact story with, however, some character motivations lost in the process. They praised the acting of Tallulah Bankhead and the other principals, but said the audience responded most to Eric Maturin's performance. The cast list provided by The Daily Telegraph showed three characters not present in the US production; two of these were performed by actors "doubling up" from minor roles.

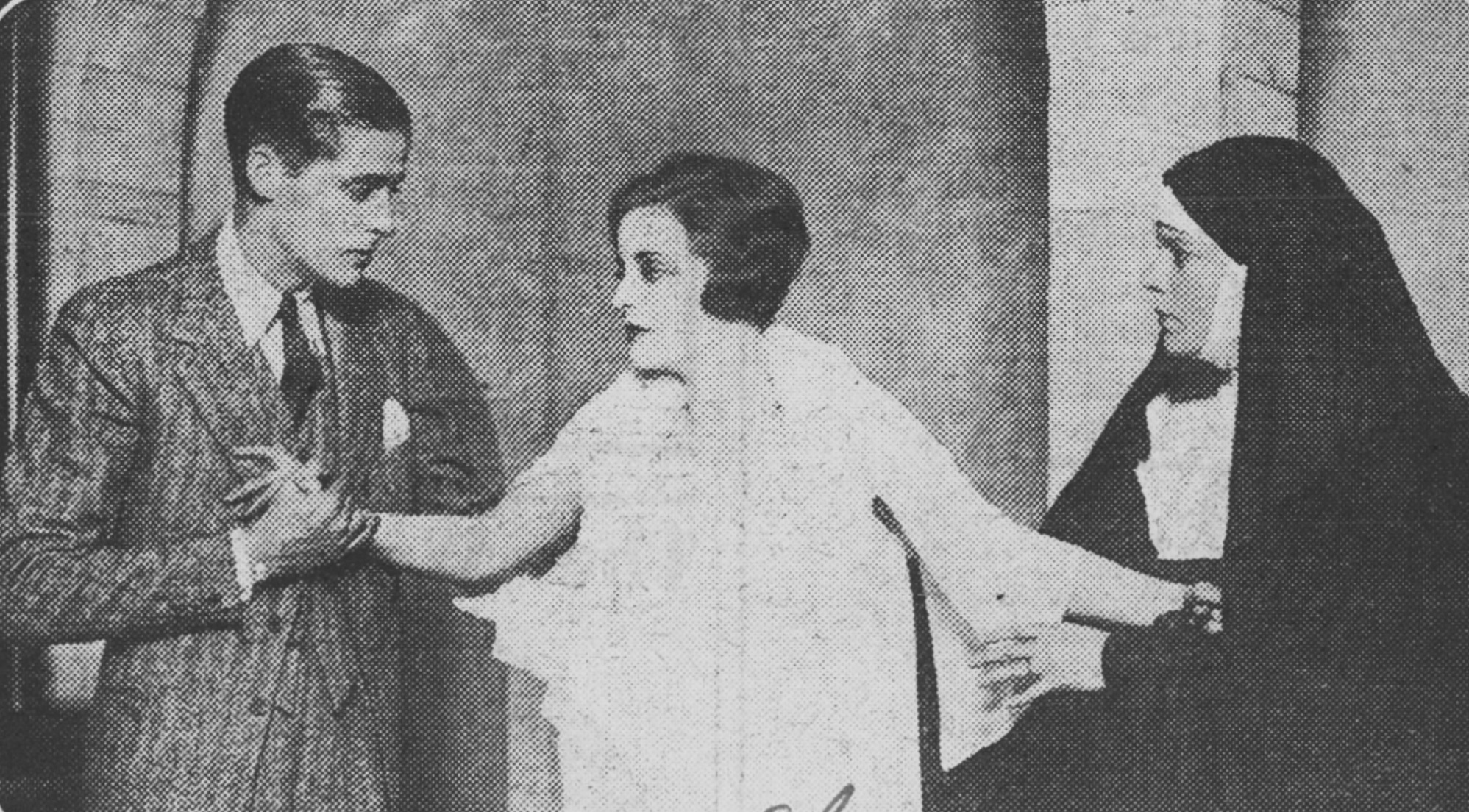

The Evening Standard critic thought the play "a big success", and Tallulah Bankhead captured Iris Fenwick well, though she was inaudible at times. They too saluted the performance of Eric Maturin, but thought Norman McKinnel's big scene in Act IV conveyed more of "Big Business" than the "Army and County". A dissenting view came from The Daily Graphic, which traduced the play "as a rather crude and complicated melodrama relieved by verbal felicities that are faintly reminiscent of Saki".

The production closed at the Adelphi on December 19, 1925, after fifteen weeks. One American newspaper ascribed the closing to the play being "too tragic for the Christmas season", while another said it had received "universally condemnatory notices as a play" and did not attract any business.

== Bibliography ==
- Burns Mantle (ed). The Best Plays of 1925-26 And The Year Book Of The Drama In America. Dodd, Mead and Company, 1926.
