= The Flying Dutchman (nickname) =

As a nickname, The Flying Dutchman may refer to:

- Remy Bonjasky (born 1976), Surinamese-Dutch kickboxer
- Johan Cruyff (1947–2016), Dutch footballer
- Herman Everhardus (1912–1980), American college football player
- Anthony Fokker (1890–1939), Dutch aircraft designer
- Dan Gadzuric (born 1978), Dutch basketball player
- Jurgen van den Goorbergh (born 1969), Dutch motorcycle road racer
- Paul Vander Haar (born 1958), former Australian rules footballer
- Benjamin Hafner (1821–1899), American train driver
- Pieter van den Hoogenband (born 1978), Dutch former swimmer and triple Olympic champion
- Fred Imhoff (born 1942), Dutch sailor
- Johnny Kitzmiller (1904–1986), American college football player, member of the College Football Hall of Fame
- Charles Kurtsinger (1906–1946), American Hall of Fame jockey
- Herman Long (baseball) (1866–1909), American baseball player
- Arie Luyendyk (born 1953), Dutch auto racing driver
- William Moore (steamship captain) (1822–1909), steamship captain, businessman, miner and explorer in British Columbia and Alaska
- Tom Okker (born 1944), Dutch tennis player
- Robin van Persie (born 1983), Dutch footballer
- Arjen Robben (born 1984), Dutch footballer
- Conny van Rietschoten (1926–2013), Dutch yacht skipper
- Roland Scholten (born 1965), Dutch former darts player
- Robin Smeulders (born 1987), German basketball player
- Dick Van Arsdale (born 1943), American National Basketball Association executive and former player and coach
- Honus Wagner (1874–1955), American baseball player
- Robert de Wilde (born 1977), Dutch bicycle motocross (BMX) rider
- Epke Zonderland (born 1986), Dutch gymnast
- Max Verstappen (born 1997), Dutch Formula 1 driver
- Mathieu van der Poel (born 1995), Dutch professional cyclist
- Dutch Clark (1906–1978)

American football player (Portsmouth Spartans, Detroit Lions), First Team All American (Colorado College)

== See also ==
- The Flying Dutchman (disambiguation)
