= The Flying Dutchman (novel) =

1939 novel by Michael Arlen

- First US edition
- Author: Michael Arlen
- Publisher: Heinemann (UK); Doubleday Doran (US)
- Publication date: 1939

The Flying Dutchman is a 1939 novel by a British author Michael Arlen, published by Heinemann in the UK and by Doubleday Doran in the US. It was his last book before he had his first child.

The novel has been characterised as a psychological study of "an unfrightened man exploring the darkness of the mind." Kirkus Reviews described it as an urbane and witty fantasy with topical implications.

== Plot summary ==
Chance Winter, whose self-hatred extends to a searing contempt for all humanity, assembles a clandestine group of anarchist killers.
