= The Flying Dutchman (1957 film) =

De Vliegende Hollander
- Directed by: Gerard Rutten
- Written by: Ed Hoornik
- Starring: Ton Kuyl
- Music by: Henk Badings
- Release date: 5 July 1957
- Running time: 90 minutes
- Country: Netherlands
- Language: Dutch

The Flying Dutchman or De Vliegende Hollander is a 1957 Dutch biographical film directed by Gerard Rutten about the life of famed aviator Anthony Fokker.

== Plot ==
The film centers around Fokker's first years as he starts up his aeroplane factory. With trial and error he eventually manages to make trustworthy planes and set up a company.

== Cast ==
- Ton Kuyl - Anthony Fokker
- Mimi Boesnach - Mother of Anthony Fokker
- Cruys Voorbergh
- Coen Flink
- Bob De Lange
- Guus Oster
- Bernard Droog
- Paul Huf
- Lies Franken
- Sophie van Dijk
