= Guthrie McClintic =

American theatre director, film director, and producer (1893–1974)

- Guthrie McClintic and wife Katharine Cornell in 1954
- Born: August 6, 1893; Seattle, Washington, U.S.
- Died: October 29, 1961 (aged 68); Sneden's Landing, New York, U.S.
- Occupations: Theatre director; film director; film producer
- Spouse: Katharine Cornell (m. 1921)

Guthrie McClintic (August 6, 1893 – October 29, 1961) was an American theatre director, film director, and producer based in New York.

== Life and career ==
McClintic was born in Seattle, attended Washington University in St. Louis and New York's American Academy of Dramatic Arts, and became an actor, but soon became a stage manager and casting director for major Broadway producer Winthrop Ames. His Broadway directorial debut was on A. A. Milne's The Dover Road. McClintic's first major success was on The Barretts of Wimpole Street featuring his wife, the American actress Katharine Cornell, in 1931. He also directed Hamlet featuring John Gielgud in New York in 1936.

Katharine Cornell served on the Board of Directors of The Rehearsal Club, a place where young actresses could stay while looking for work in the theatre. McClintic sometimes found roles for the young women in his plays.

In what may have been a lavender marriage, gay McClintic was married for 40 years to actress Katharine Cornell, herself a lesbian. After they were married, they formed a production team M.C. & C Company, which produced plays for the rest of his life. He directed every play that Cornell starred in, including Romeo and Juliet, Candida, Antony and Cleopatra, No Time for Comedy, Antigone, Saint Joan, The Doctor's Dilemma, Three Sisters, and There Shall Be No Night, and The Constant Wife. Their production company brought over many of the leading Shakespearean actors of the day—including John Gielgud, Ralph Richardson, Maurice Evans, and Laurence Olivier—giving them their first prominent Broadway roles.

McClintic died of cancer on October 29, 1961, at his home in Sneden's Landing, New York. His widow retired from acting shortly after his death, her last role being in Jerome Kilty's dramatization of Dear Liar in 1961.

== Theatre ==
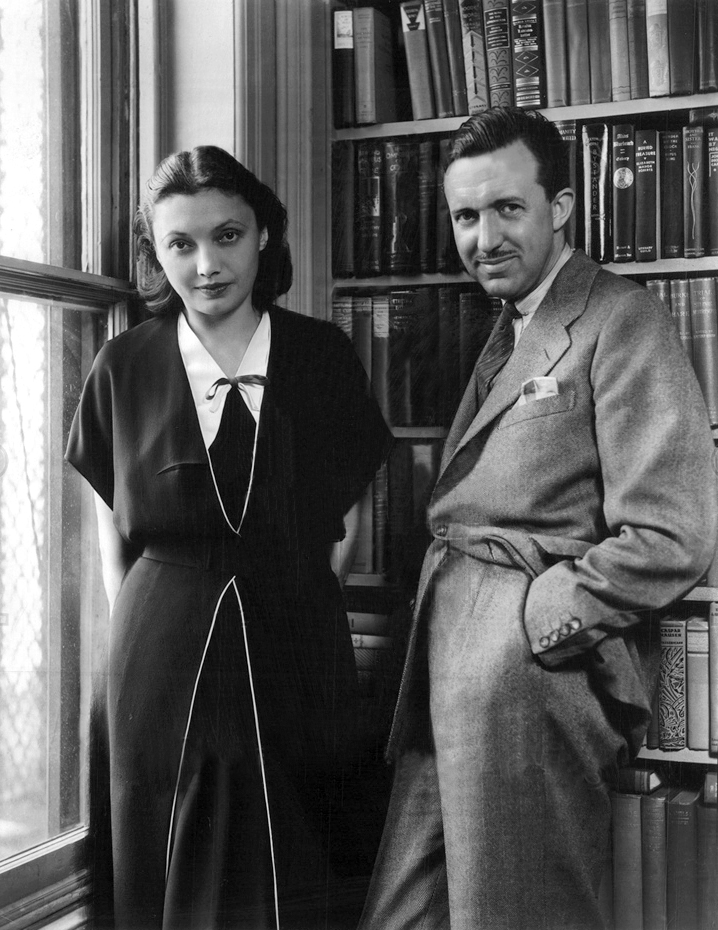
Katharine Cornell and Guthrie McClintic in the library of their home at 23 Beekman Place, New York City (1933)

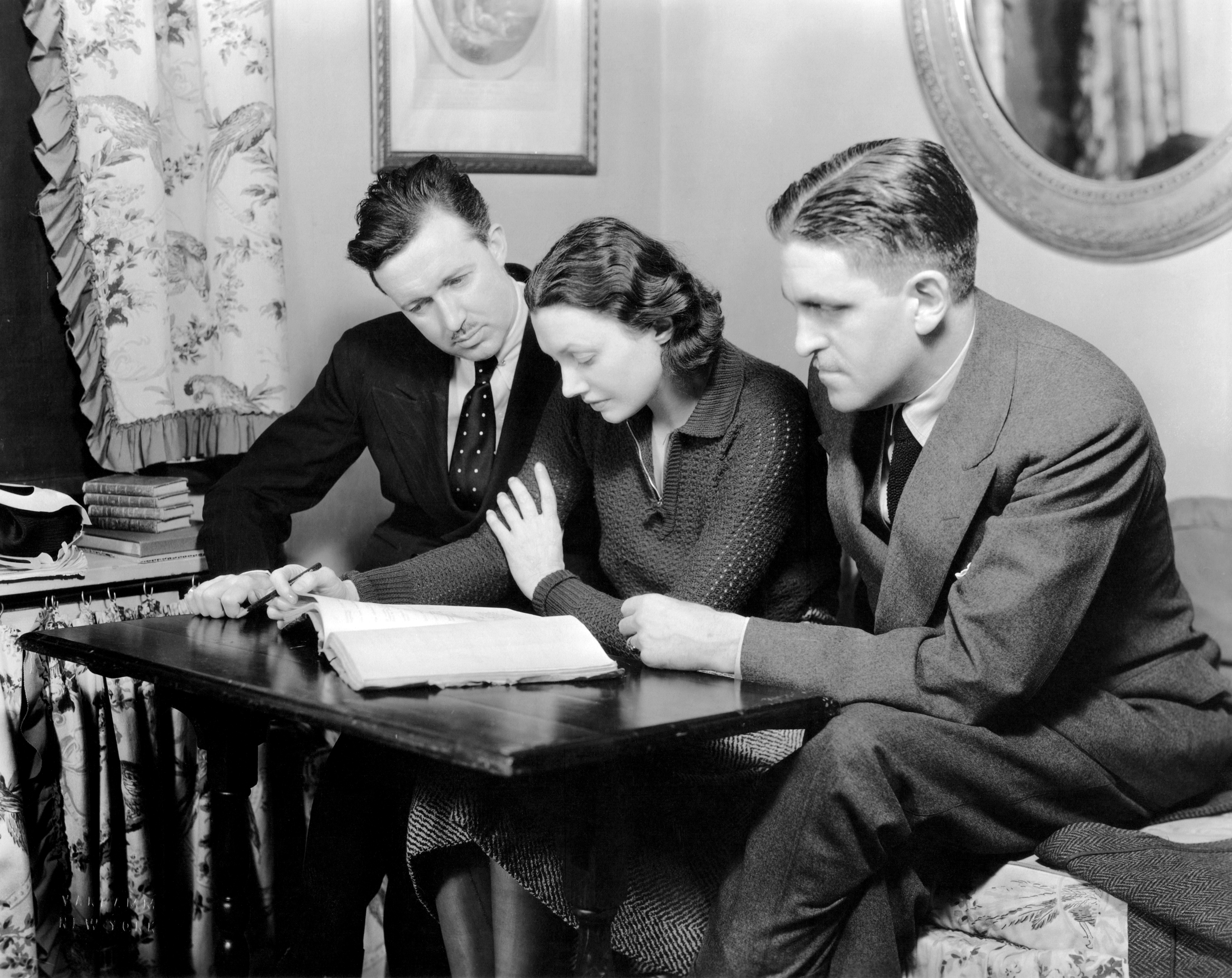
McClintic, Cornell and playwright Sidney Howard at the Belasco Theatre, preparing Cornell's production of Alien Corn (1933)

- The Dover Road (1921)
- The Green Hat (1925)
- The Letter (1927)
- The Barretts of Wimpole Street (1931)
- Alien Corn (1933)
- Romeo and Juliet (1934)
- The Old Maid (1935)
- Winterset (1935)
- Ethan Frome (1936)
- Saint Joan (1936)
- Hamlet (1936)
- Candida (1937)
- High Tor (1937)
- Key Largo (1939)
- No Time for Comedy (1939)
- The Doctor's Dilemma (1941)
- The Playboy of the Western World (1946)
- Dishonored Lady (1947)
- Antony and Cleopatra (1947)
- Medea (1949)
- Dear Liar (1960)

== Films ==
- On Your Back (1930)
- Once a Lady (1931)
- Once a Sinner (1931)
