= The Flying Frenchman =

Sculpture in Hong Kong

Coordinates: 22°17′N 114°10′E

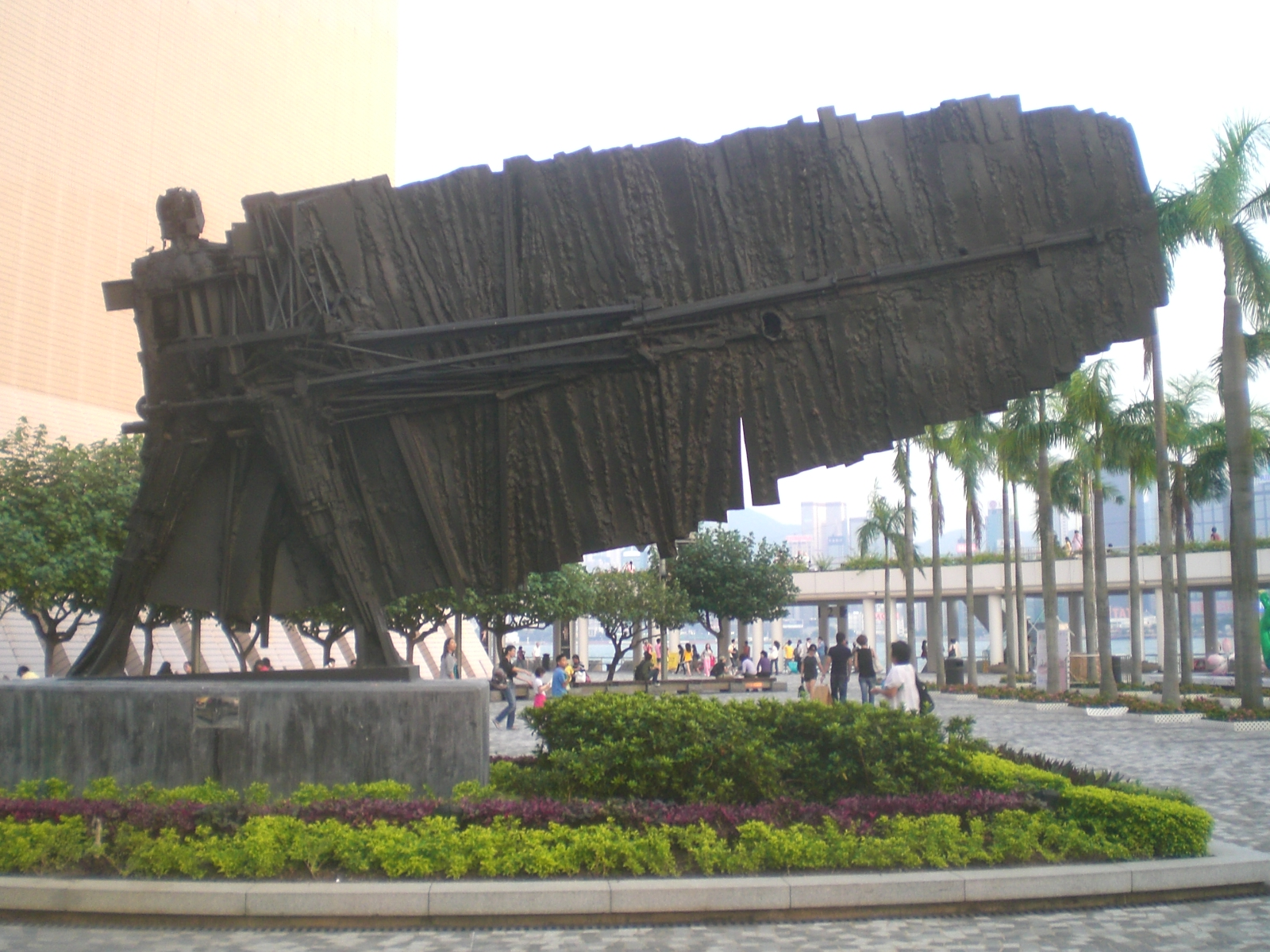
- The sculpture in 2009
- Artist: César Baldaccini
- Medium: Bronze sculpture
- Location: Hong Kong

The Flying Frenchman is a bronze sculpture by César Baldaccini, installed outside the Hong Kong Cultural Centre along Tsim Sha Tsui's waterfront, in Kowloon, Hong Kong. The sculpture was gifted to Hong Kong by the Cartier Foundation in 1992. The name "Freedom Fighter" was rejected by Hong Kong's government, causing the artist not to attend the unveiling ceremony in 1993.
