= Michael Arlen =

Writer (1895–1956)

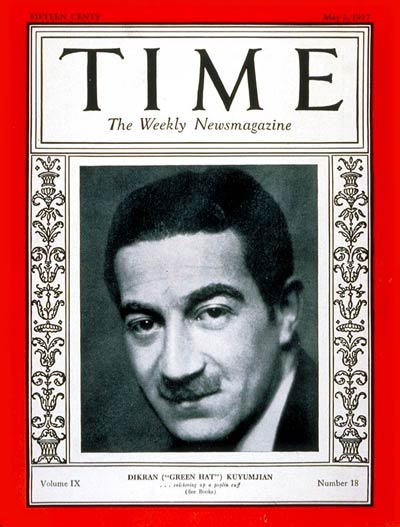
- Arlen on the cover of Time in 1927
- Born: Dikran Sarkis Kouyoumdjian; 16 November 1895; Ruse, Bulgaria
- Died: 23 June 1956 (aged 60); New York City, U.S.
- Citizenship: Bulgarian (1895–1922); British (1922–1953); United States (1953-1956)
- Education: Malvern College; University of Edinburgh
- Occupations: Essayist; short story writer; novelist; playwright; scriptwriter
- Spouse: Atalanta Mercati (m. 1928)
- Children: 2, including Michael

Michael Arlen (born Dikran Sarkis Kouyoumdjian, (Note: Bulgarian: Дикран Саркис Куюмджян) Armenian: Տիգրան Գոյումճեան, 16 November 1895 – 23 June 1956) was an essayist, short story writer, novelist, playwright, and scriptwriter. He had his greatest successes in the 1920s while living and writing in England, publishing the best-selling novel The Green Hat in 1924. Arlen is most famous for his satirical romances set in English smart society, but he also wrote gothic horror and psychological thrillers, for instance "The Gentleman from America", which was filmed in 1948 as The Fatal Night, and again in 1956 as a television episode for Alfred Hitchcock's TV series Alfred Hitchcock Presents. Near the end of his life, Arlen mainly occupied himself with political writing. Arlen's vivid but colloquial style "with unusual inversions and inflections with a heightened exotic pitch" came to be known as 'Arlenesque'.

His works became an inspiration for famous Hollywood movies such as A Woman of Affairs (1928), starring Greta Garbo and John Gilbert; The Golden Arrow (1936), starring Bette Davis; and he was screenwriter of The Heavenly Body (1944), based on a story by Jacques Théry, starring William Powell and Hedy Lamarr.

== Biography ==
=== Early life ===
Michael Arlen was born Dikran Sarkis Kouyoumdjian on 16 November 1895, in Ruse, Bulgaria, to an Armenian merchant family. In 1892, his family moved to Plovdiv, Bulgaria, after fleeing Turkish persecutions of Armenians in the Ottoman Empire. In Plovdiv, Arlen's father, Sarkis Kouyoumdjian, established a successful import business. In 1895, Arlen was born as the youngest child of five, having three brothers, Takvor, Krikor, and Roupen, and one sister, Ahavni. Arlen's family moved once more: this time to the seaside town of Southport in Lancashire, England.

=== Adolescence ===
After studying at Malvern College and spending a brief time in Switzerland, Arlen enrolled as a medical student at the University of Edinburgh, despite his and his family's intention that he attend the University of Oxford. If we are to view Arlen's first published book, The London Venture, as being semi-autobiographical, then we will never know why Arlen made this "silly mistake" of going to Edinburgh instead of Oxford. We know however what led Arlen to London, where he would make his break into a literary career.

In The London Venture, Arlen wrote: "I, up at Edinburgh, was on the high road to general fecklessness. I only stayed there a few months; jumbled months of elementary medicine, political economy, metaphysics, theosophy – I once handed round programmes at an Annie Besant lecture at the Usher Hall – and beer, lots of beer. And then, one night, I emptied my last mug, and with another side-glance at Oxford, came down to London; 'to take up a literary career' my biographer will no doubt write of me." (p. 132)

In 1913, after a few months of university, Arlen moved to London to live by writing. A year later, the First World War broke out and made Arlen's position in England as a Bulgarian national rather difficult. Arlen's nationality was still Bulgarian, but Bulgaria had disowned him because he would not serve in Bulgaria's army. Bulgaria being allies with Germany made England suspicious of Arlen, who could neither be naturalized as a British citizen, nor change his name. In London, Arlen found company in modernist literary circles with others who had been looked upon suspiciously or had been denied military service. Among these were Aldous Huxley, D. H. Lawrence, Nancy Cunard, and George Moore.

=== Young adulthood ===
Arlen began his literary career in 1916, writing under his birth name, Dikran Kouyoumdjian, firstly in a London-based Armenian periodical, Ararat: A Searchlight on Armenia, and soon afterward for The New Age, a British weekly review of politics, arts, and literature. For these two magazines, Arlen wrote essays, book reviews, personal essays, short stories, and even one short play.

His last submissions to The New Age, a series of semi-autobiographical personal essays entitled "The London Papers", were assembled in 1920 and published with slight revisions as The London Venture. From this time onward he began to sign his works as 'Michael Arlen'. In January and April 1920, he had already published two short stories in The English Review signed thus. He became naturalized as a British citizen in 1922, and legally changed from his birth name to Michael Arlen.

Arlen spent some time in France with Nancy Cunard in 1920, although she was married to someone else at the time; the relationship fuelled Aldous Huxley's jealousy. During the 1920s, Arlen rented rooms opposite 'The Grapes' public house in Shepherd Market, then a bohemian Mayfair address. He later used Shepherd Market as the setting for The Green Hat.

==== Fame and fortune ====
After The London Venture, Arlen worked on romances, spicing them with elements of psychological thrills and horror, including The Romantic Lady, These Charming People, and "Piracy": A Romantic Chronicle of These Days. In These Charming People, for instance, Arlen wrote tales which included elements of fantasy and horror, in particular "The Ancient Sin" and "The Loquacious Lady of Lansdowne Passage". The volume also introduced a 'gentleman crook' reminiscent of Raffles. His identity is not entirely clear until the story "Salute the Cavalier". The title of another story, "When a Nightingale Sang in Berkeley Square", was the inspiration for the popular song of the same name.

These works culminated in the book that would launch Arlen's fame and fortune in the 1920s: The Green Hat, published in 1924. The Green Hat narrates the short life and violent death of Iris Storm, a femme fatale and dashing widow, the owner of a yellow Hispano-Suiza as well as the green hat of the title. Arlen adapted the novel for a 1925 Broadway play, starring Katharine Cornell and Leslie Howard in his most successful Broadway appearance to date. An almost simultaneous but less successful adaptation in London's West End starred Tallulah Bankhead. The book figures in A Question of Upbringing by Anthony Powell as representative of life in Shepherd Market.

The novel was adapted for the silent 1928 Hollywood film A Woman of Affairs starring Greta Garbo and John Gilbert. The Green Hat was considered provocative in the United States; hence, the movie was not allowed to make any references to it. The film obscured or altered plot points in the novel concerning homosexuality and venereal disease. It was adapted a second time in 1934, as Outcast Lady, with Constance Bennett and Herbert Marshall in the main roles.

After the publication of The Green Hat, Arlen became almost instantly famous, rich, incessantly in the spotlight and newspapers. During the mid-1920s, Arlen frequently travelled to the United States and worked on plays and films, including Dear Father and These Charming People.

According to Noël Coward's biographer Sheridan Morley, in 1924 Arlen rescued the play The Vortex by writing Coward a cheque for £250 when it seemed that the production would otherwise collapse (according to Coward himself—“Present Indicative,” p. 188–it was for £200). The Vortex made Coward's name.

Naturally, after all this fame and attention, Arlen felt somewhat anxious to write the book that would follow The Green Hat. Arlen wrote Young Men in Love (1927) and received mixed reviews. Arlen continued with Lily Christine (1928), Babes in the Wood (1929), and Men Dislike Women (1931), none of which received the enthusiastic reviews that The Green Hat had received. Arlen also wrote a volume of Ghost Stories (1927), which were influenced by Saki, Oscar Wilde and Arthur Machen.

=== Later life ===
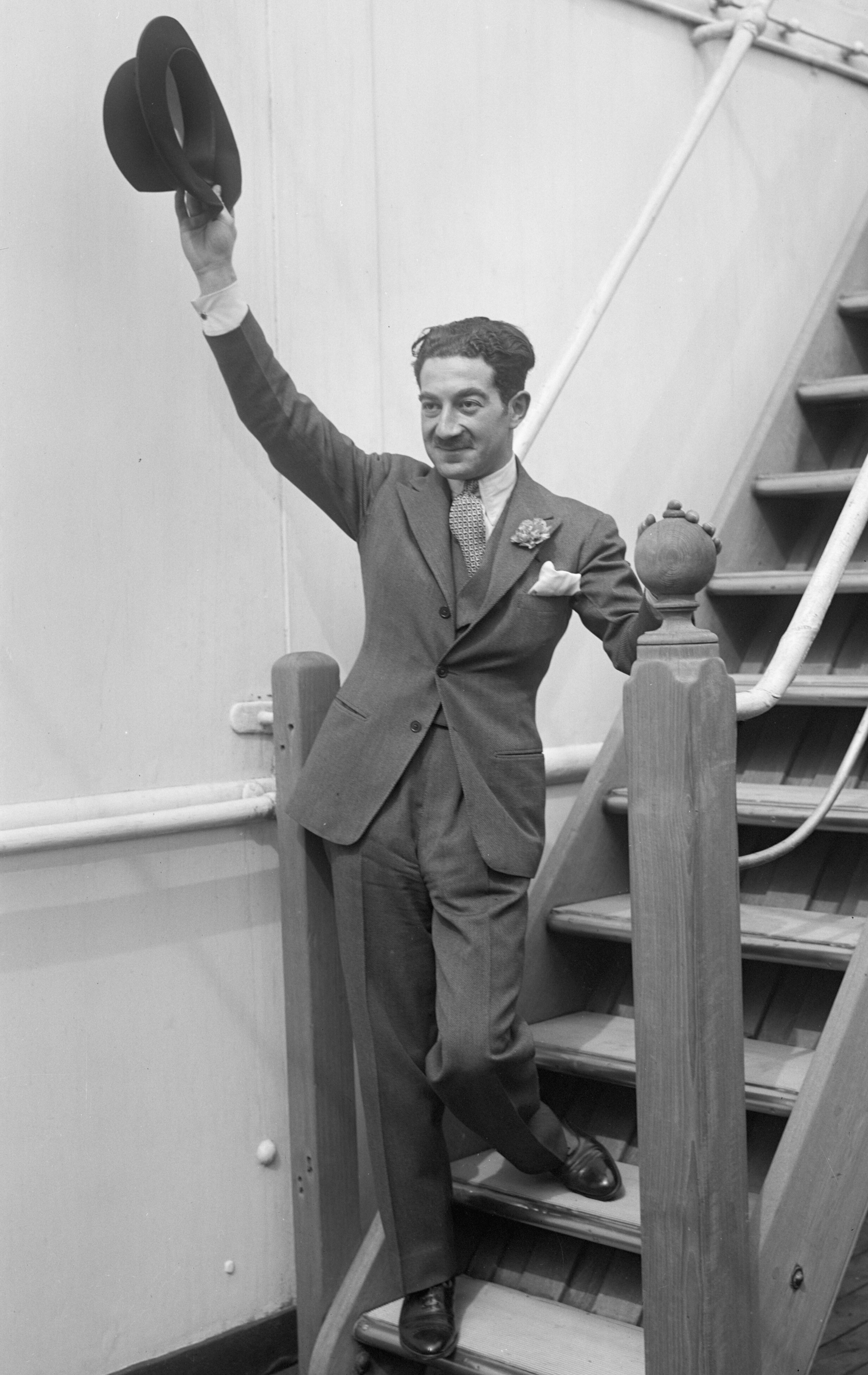
Michael Arlen on ship, 1920s

In 1927, Arlen, feeling ill, joined D. H. Lawrence in Florence, Italy. Lawrence was working on Lady Chatterley's Lover and Arlen served as a model for the character Michaelis.

Arlen then moved to Cannes, France and, in 1928, married Countess Atalanta Mercati. They had two children, a son, Michael John Arlen born in 1930, and a daughter, Venetia Arlen, born in 1933.

With his following novel, Man's Mortality (1933), Arlen turned to political writing and science fiction, brushing aside his earlier, smart society romances. Set fifty years in the future, in 1983, the book can be seen as portraying a Dystopia, whose rulers claim that it is a Utopia. Most critics compared it unfavourably with Huxley's Brave New World, which had been published the previous year.

In the following years, Arlen also returned to gothic horror with Hell! Said the Duchess: A Bed-Time Story (1934). In his final collection of short stories, The Crooked Coronet (1939), Arlen briefly returns to his earlier romantic, but also comic, style. Arlen's claim to fame in the world of crime fiction rests on one short story, "Gay Falcon" (1940), in which he introduced gentleman sleuth Gay Stanhope Falcon. Renamed Gay Lawrence and nicknamed 'the Falcon', the character was taken up by Hollywood in 1941, and expanded into a series of mystery films with George Sanders in the title role. When Sanders left the role, he was succeeded by his brother Tom Conway, who played Gay Lawrence's brother Tom and also used the nickname 'the Falcon'.

In 1939, when the Second World War began, Arlen returned to England. While his wife, Atalanta, joined the Red Cross, Arlen wrote columns for The Tatler. That same year, his final book, The Flying Dutchman (1939), was published, a political novel, commenting harshly on Germany's position in the war.

In 1940, Arlen was appointed Civil Defence Public Relations Officer for the East Midlands, but when his loyalty to England was questioned in the House of Commons in 1941, he resigned and moved to America. Between 1942 and 1945 he lived intermittently in Hollywood, working on film scripts, none of which carried his byline with the exception of The Heavenly Body (1944, starring Hedy Lamarr and William Powell.) He settled permanently in New York in 1946. For the next ten years of his life, Arlen suffered from writer's block.

He died of cancer on June 23, 1956, in New York.

== Critical reception ==
Horror writer Karl Edward Wagner included Hell! Said the Duchess on his list of "The Thirteen Best Supernatural Horror Novels" in the May 1983 issue of The Twilight Zone Magazine. F. Scott Fitzgerald was an admirer of Arlen's work. In A Moveable Feast, Ernest Hemingway recounts how, as he and Fitzgerald were sharing a long car journey to Paris, Fitzgerald told him the plots of all Arlen's books, concluding that the author was "the man you had to watch".

== Selected bibliography ==
=== Novels ===
- The London Venture (Heinemann, 1920)
- The Romantic Lady (George H. Doran Company, 1921)
- Piracy (Collins, 1922)
- The Green Hat (Collins, 1924)
- The Green Hat. A romance for a few people (W. Collins Sons & Co., 1926)
- Young Men in Love (Hutchinson, 1927)
- Lily Christine (Doubleday, Doran, 1929)
- Men Dislike Women (Heinemann, 1931)
- Man's Mortality (Heinemann, 1933)
- Hell! Said the Duchess (Heinemann, 1934)
- The Flying Dutchman (Heinemann, 1939)

=== Plays ===
- Dear Father (1915) Three-act comedy, written when Arlen was 19 years-old.
- The Green Hat (1925) Based on the 1924 novel of the same name.
- These Charming People (1925) Revised and renamed version of Dear Father.

=== Short stories ===
- The Romantic Lady (Collins, 1921)
- These Charming People (Collins, 1923) (15 thematically connected short stories)
- May Fair, In Which Are Told the Last Adventures of These Charming People (Collins, 1925) - contains "The Ghoul of Golders Green"
- Georgian Stories (Putnam's Sons, 1925)
- Ghost Stories (Collins, 1927)
- Babes in the Wood (Hutchinson, 1930)
- The Crooked Coronet. And other misrepresentations of the real facts of life (Heinemann, 1937)
- The Ancient Sin and Other Stories (Collins, 1930) (collection)
- The Short Stories of Michael Arlen (Collins, 1933) (collection)
- The Great Book of Mystery (Odhams, undated circa 1930s)
