= Dead or Alive =

Dead or alive is a phrase on a wanted poster.

Dead or Alive may also refer to:

== Film ==
- Dead or Alive (1921 film), an American silent film directed by Dell Henderson
- Dead or Alive (1944 film), an American film starring Tex Ritter
- Dead or Alive, or A Minute to Pray, a Second to Die, a 1968 film
- Dead or Alive 1918, a 2012 Finnish dramatized documentary about the Battle of Tampere in the Finnish Civil War
- Lupin III: Dead or Alive, a 1996 animated film
- Dead or Alive (1999 film), a Japanese yakuza action film
  - Dead or Alive 2: Birds, 2000
  - Dead or Alive: Final, 2002
- DOA: Dead or Alive, a 2006 film, based on the video game series
- Tere Bin Laden: Dead or Alive, a 2016 Indian comedy film, sequel to Tere Bin Laden (2010)

== Television ==
- Wanted: Dead or Alive, 1958 American western
- "Alive or Dead", The Edison Twins season 2, episode 12 (1985)
- "Anastasia: Dead or Alive?", Nova (American) season 23, episode 1 (1995)
- "Batman: Dead or Alive", Challenge of the Superfriends episode 13a (1978)
- "Dead or Alive", 26 Men season 2, episode 24 (1959)
- "Dead or Alive", Bose: Dead/Alive episode 1 (2017)
- "Dead or Alive", Burn Notice season 4, episode 16 (2010)
- "Dead or Alive", Close to Home (2005) season 1, episode 14 (2006)
- "Dead or Alive", Crossing Jordan season 3, episode 5 (2004)
- "Dead or Alive", Deadliest Catch season 15, episode 20 (2019)
- "Dead or Alive: Part 1", Dr. Quinn, Medicine Woman season 4, episode 17 (1996)
- "Dead or Alive: Part 2", Dr. Quinn, Medicine Woman season 4, season 18 (1996)
- "Dead or Alive", Hunter (1984 American) season 1, episode 9 (1984)
- "Dead or Alive", Icons season 3, episode 11 (2004)
- "Dead or Alive", M Squad season 2, episode 2 (1958)
- "Dead or Alive", My Love from the Star (Philippine) episode 38 (2017)
- "Dead or Alive", Nikita season 4, episode 2 (2013)
- "Dead or Alive?", Secret History series 3, episode 4 (1994)
- "Dead or Alive", Skippy the Bush Kangaroo season 1, episode 7 (1968)
- "Dead or Alive", The Adventures of Robin Hood series 1, episode 3 (1955)
- "Dead or Alive", The Circus: Inside the Greatest Political Show on Earth season 1, episode 9 (2016)
- "Dead or Alive", The Flash (2014) season 3, episode 11 (2017)
- "Dead or Alive", The Following season 3, episode 14 (2015)
- "Dead or Alive", The Lost Pirate Kingdom episode 6 (2021)
- "Dead or Alive", The Streets of San Francisco season 5, episode 3 (1976)
- "Dead or Alive", Tokyo Revengers episode 20 (2021)
- "Dead or Alive", Water Rats season 2, episode 20 (1997)
- "Dead or Alive", Widows' War episode 56 (2024)
- "Dead or Alive", Wonders of the Solar System episode 5 (2010)
- "Dead or Alive", World Trigger episode 55 (2015)
- "Mars Dead or Alive", Nova (American) season 31, episode 9 (2004)
- "Seavers: Dead or Alive", The Fall Guy season 5, episode 7 (1985)

== Games ==
- Dead or Alive (franchise), a video game series
  - Dead or Alive (video game), 1996

== Literature ==
- Dead or Alive (novel), a 2010 book by Tom Clancy with Grant Blackwood
- Dead or Alive, a posthumous novel by Hugh Conway, 1886

== Music ==
- Dead or Alive (band), a British pop band
- Dead or Alive (album), by FURT (Richard Barrett and Paul Obermayer), 2004
- "Dead or Alive" (Bill Anderson song), 1959
- "Dead or Alive" (KAT-TUN song), 2015
- "Dead or Alive" (Lil Tecca song), 2023
- "Dead or Alive", by Deep Purple from the 1987 album The House of Blue Light
- "Dead or Alive", by John Cale from the 1981 album Honi Soit
- "Dead or Alive", by Johnny Thunders, 1978
- "Dead or Alive", by Journey from the 1981 album Escape
- "Dead or Alive", by Oingo Boingo from the 1983 album Good for Your Soul
- "Dead or Alive", by ZZ Ward from the 2023 album Dirty Shine
- "(Wanted) Dead or Alive", by The Manhattan Transfer from the 1981 album Mecca for Moderns
- "D.O.A." (Dead or Alive), by Van Halen from the 1979 album Van Halen II

== See also ==
- Dead Alive (disambiguation)
- Dead and Alive (disambiguation)
- DOA (disambiguation)
- Wanted Dead or Alive (disambiguation)
- Dead on Arrival (disambiguation)
- "Dead or Alive Or", an episode of The Walking Dead
