= David White (actor) =

American actor (1916–1990)

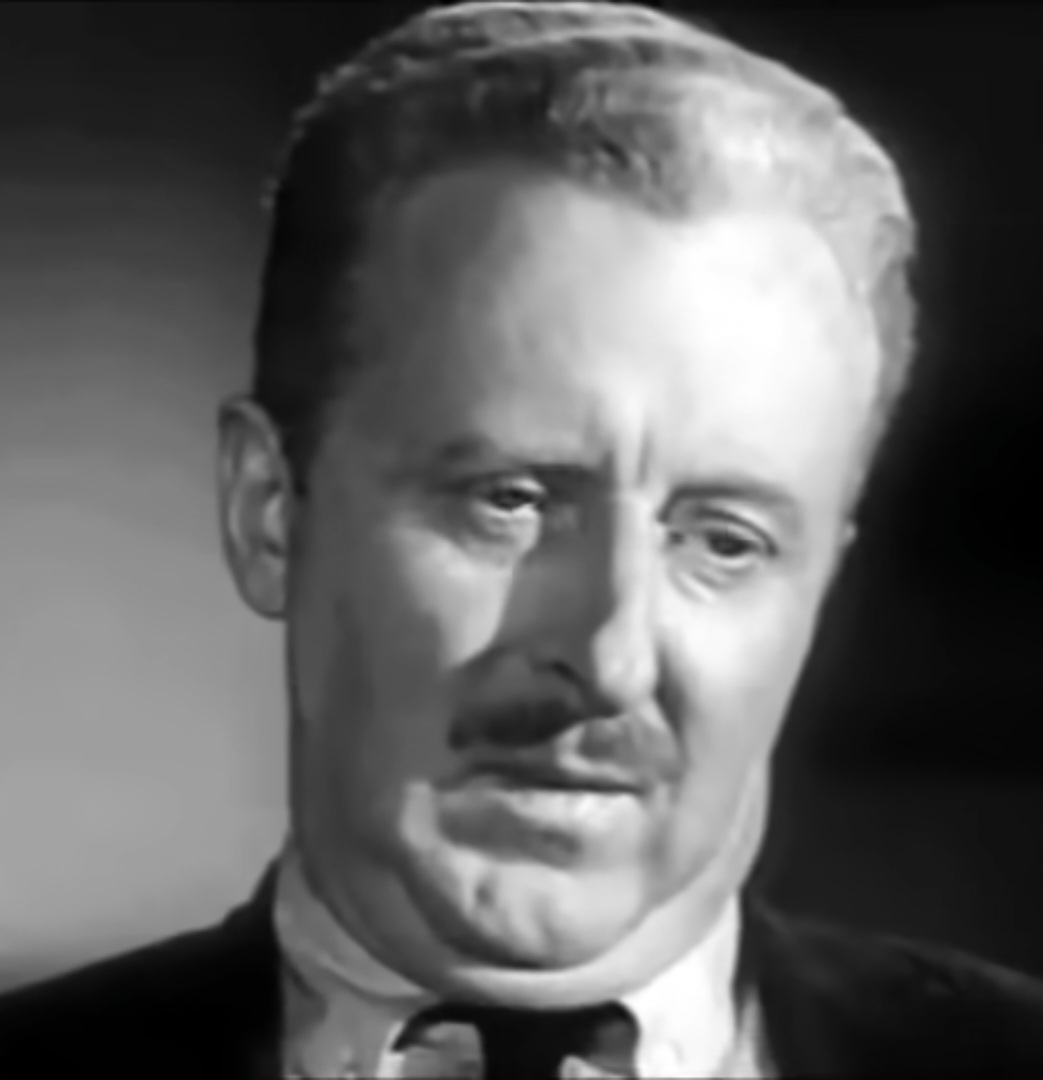
- White in the TV-series One Step Beyond, episode Delusion, 1959
- Born: April 4, 1916; Denver, Colorado, U.S.
- Died: November 27, 1990 (aged 74); North Hollywood, Los Angeles, California, U.S.
- Education: Los Angeles City College
- Occupation: Actor
- Years active: circa 1940–1990
- Known for: Bewitched; The Apartment; Spider-Man; Sweet Smell of Success; Sunrise at Campobello; The Lawbreakers
- Height: 6 ft 2 in (1.88 m)
- Spouses: Mary Welch (m. 1952; died 1958) Elizabeth "Lisa" Gorsuch (1923-2017) (m. 1959, divorced)
- Children: 2

David White (April 4, 1916 – November 27, 1990) was an American stage, film, and television actor best known for playing Darrin Stephens's boss Larry Tate from 1964 to 1972 on the ABC situation comedy Bewitched.

== Early life ==
Born on April 4, 1916, in Denver, Colorado, he later moved with his family to Phoenixville, Pennsylvania. He graduated from Los Angeles City College and began acting at the Pasadena Playhouse and the Cleveland Play House. He enlisted in the United States Marine Corps during World War II, and after his discharge, made his Broadway debut in 1949 in Leaf and Bough.

== Career ==
White appeared on numerous television series in the 1950s and 1960s, including One Step Beyond, where he played a police officer. He made two guest appearances on the CBS courtroom drama Perry Mason. In 1960, he played Henry De Garmo in "The Case of the Madcap Modiste" and in 1963, he played newspaper editor Victor Kendall in "The Case of the Witless Witness". He also appeared in Peter Gunn, Mr. Lucky, The Untouchables, The Fugitive, Mission: Impossible, My Three Sons, Father Knows Best , The Six Million Dollar Man, Bonanza, Have Gun – Will Travel, My Favorite Martian, and Dick Tracy. He appeared in two episodes of The Twilight Zone: "I Sing the Body Electric" and "A World of Difference." Also in 1963, he appeared on Alfred Hitchcock Presents as Detective Burr in "An Out for Oscar", and as Lance Hawthorn in "The Dark Pool". Though primarily known for television work, White had several memorable supporting feature-film roles, including portraying a sleazy columnist in Sweet Smell of Success (1957), The Apartment (1960), in which he played a philandering executive, and Sunrise at Campobello (also 1960) and The Lawbreakers (1961).

In 1964, White was cast as sycophantic advertising executive Larry Tate on Bewitched, a role he played for the show's entire run (1964–1972). The character is president of the McMann & Tate advertising agency, workplace of Dick York's (and later Dick Sargent's) Darrin Stephens character. Many of the show's episodes revolved around Tate's attempts to land lucrative advertising accounts. This is the role for which he would become best-known both during his life and posthumously. Larry Tate's baby boy Jonathan was named after White's son. White also directed one season-six episode of Bewitched, "Sam’s Double Mother Trouble".

Following the end of Bewitched, White was a popular character actor on numerous television series for the next decade, including The Love Boat, Remington Steele, Adam-12, The Rockford Files, Columbo: Identity Crisis, What's Happening!!, Rhoda, Quincy, M.E., The Odd Couple, Cagney & Lacey, Wonder Woman and Dallas. He played the role of J. Jonah Jameson in the pilot episode of the television series The Amazing Spider-Man. His final role came in 1986 on an episode of Dynasty. He also appeared in the movies The Happy Hooker Goes to Washington and Disney's Snowball Express, and had a prominent role as one of the villains in the 1985 version of Brewster's Millions starring Richard Pryor.

== Personal life ==
White's first marriage was to stage actress Mary Welch. On May 31, 1958, Welch died of complications from her second pregnancy. Their son, Jonathan, died on December 21, 1988, at the age of 33, in the bombing of Pan Am Flight 103 over Lockerbie, Scotland.

White married actress Lisa Gorsuch in 1959, with whom he had a daughter, Alexandra. They divorced and Gorsuch remarried, date unknown.

== Death ==
David White died of a heart attack on November 27, 1990, in North Hollywood, California, aged 74. He was survived by his daughter from his second marriage, Alexandra.

== Filmography ==
Year	Title	Role	Notes
1957	Sweet Smell of Success	Otis Elwell	Uncredited
1958	The Goddess	Burt Harris	Uncredited
1960	The Apartment	Mr. Eichelberger	
1960	Sunrise at Campobello	Mr. Lassiter	
1961	The Great Impostor	Dr. Hammond	
1961	Madison Avenue	Stevenson Brock	
1965	The Lollipop Cover	Richard	
1970	The Red, White, and Black	10th Cavalry Trooper #16	
1972	Snowball Express	Mr. Fowler	
1977	The Happy Hooker Goes to Washington	Senator Rawlings	
1985	Fast Forward	Mr. Sabol	
1985	This Wife for Hire	Larry Dunston	
1985	Brewster's Millions	George Granville	

=== Television ===
Year	Title	Role	Notes
1956	The Phil Silvers Show	Major C.W. Friend	Season 1 Episode 21: "The Rest Cure"
1957	Men of Annapolis	Captain Bronte Sr.	Season 1 Episode 7: "The Bronte Brothers"
1959	Alfred Hitchcock Presents	Barberosa	Season 5 Episode 7: "Dry Run"
1959	One Step Beyond	Lieutenant Barry	Season 2 Episode 1: "Delusion"
1959	Have Gun — Will Travel	General Crommer	Season 3 Episode 8: "Unforgiven"
1959	Have Gun — Will Travel	Bud Webster	Season 3 Episode 10: "The Golden Toad"
1960	The Twilight Zone	Brinkley	Season 1 Episode 23: "A World of Difference"
1960	Perry Mason	Henry De Garmo	Season 3 Episode 22: "The Case of the Madcap Modiste"
1960	Bonanza	Alexander Pendleton / Shanghai Pete	Season 1 Episode 28: "San Francisco"
1961	Have Gun — Will Travel	Cus Mincus	Season 4 Episode 27: "Everyman"
1962	The Twilight Zone	Mr. Rogers	Season 3 Episode 35: "I Sing the Body Electric"
1962	Have Gun — Will Travel	Marshal Tom Carey	Season 6 Episode 11: "Marshal of Sweetwater"
1962-1963	McKeever and the Colonel	Mr. Carlson, Board of Education	Season 1 Episode 11: "Hand in Glove", Season 2 Episode 17 "The Neighbor", Episode 19 "The Big Charade", Episode 24 "Project Walkie-Talkie"
1963	Perry Mason	Victor Kendall	Season 6 Episode 28: "The Case of the Witless Witness"
1963	Mr. Novak	Ralph Morrison	Season 1 Episode 7: "Hello, Miss Phipps"
1963	The Alfred Hitchcock Hour	Detective Lieutenant Burr	Season 1 Episode 26: "An Out for Oscar"
1963	The Alfred Hitchcock Hour	Lance Hawthorn	Season 1 Episode 29: "The Dark Pool"
1964	The Alfred Hitchcock Hour	Jack Fowler	Season 2 Episode 15: "Night Caller" (January 31, 1964)
1964–1972	Bewitched	Larry Tate	Recurring in seasons 1–5, starring in seasons 6–8 (191 episodes)
1973	Banacek	W. Crawford Morgan	Season 1 Episode 8: "The Two Million Clams of Cap'n Jack"
1973	Adam-12	J.T. McGrath	Season 5 Episode 21: "A Fool and His Money"
1973	The Odd Couple	Phil Russell	Season 4 Episode 9: "Felix Directs"
1974	Kojak	Ramsey Brewer	Season 1 Episode 17: "Before the Devil Knows"
1974	The Rookies	Storey	Season 3 Episode 7: "Johnny Lost His Gun"
1975	Rhoda	Ted Cummings	Season 2 Episode 12: "Friends and Mothers"
1975	Columbo	Phil Corrigan	Season 5 Episode 3: "Identity Crisis"
1976	The Rockford Files	Martin Eastman	Season 2 Episode 21: "Foul on the First Play"
1976	What's Happening!!	Mr. Reynolds	Season 1 Episode 6: "The Burger Queen"
1977	Mary Tyler Moore Show	Mr. Cobb	Season 7 Episode 18: "Hail the Conquering Gordy"
1977	The Amazing Spider-Man	J. Jonah Jameson	Season 1 Episode 1: "Spider-Man" (pilot episode)
1978	C.P.O. Sharkey	Admiral Holland	Season 2 Episode 19: "Captain's Right Hand Man"
1978	The Love Boat	Greg Beatty	Season 1 Episode 13: "Too Hot to Handle/Family Reunion/Cinderella Story"
1979	Wonder Woman	The General	Season 3 Episode 15: "The Starships Are Coming"
1981	The Incredible Hulk	Archer Hewitt	Season 5 Episode 3: "Veteran"
1981	Quincy, M.E.	Dr. Fulton	Season 6 Episode 17: "Sugar and Spice"
1982	Quincy, M.E.	Drew Castle	Season 7 Episode 20: "Expert in Murder"
1985	Remington Steele	J.W. Kendall	Season 3 Episode 22: "Steele of Approval"
1985	Cagney & Lacey	Mitchell Farnsworth	Season 4 Episode 19: "Two Grand"
1985–1986	Dallas	Marv	Season 8 Episode 30: "Swan Song" (1985); Season 10 Episode 2: "Return to Camelot: Part 2" (1986)
1986	The A-Team	Rudy / Charles Winston	Season 4 Episode 20: "Mission of Peace"
1986	Riptide	Professor Shellbeck	Season 3 Episode 17: "The Play's the Thing"
1986	Dynasty	Dr. Gavin	Season 7 Episode 5: "The Arraignment"
1989	Mergers & Acquisitions	Chairman of the Board	(short)
