= Dead and Alive =

Dead and Alive or Dead & Alive may refer to:

== Literature ==
- Dead and Alive (Koontz novel), 2009 novel by Dean Koontz
- Dead and Alive (Simonov novel), 1959 novel by Konstantin Simonov
- Dead and Alive (Innes novel), 1946 novel by Hammond Innes

== Music ==
- Dead & Alive (Doug Anthony All Stars album) (1993)
- Dead & Alive (The Devil Wears Prada album) (2012)

== Television ==
- Dead and Alive: The Race for Gus Farace, a 1991 television film directed starring Tony Danza
- "Dead and Alive", Blue Heelers season 3, episode 42 (1996)
- "Dead and Alive", Franklin & Bash season 3, episode 2 (2013)
- "Dead and Alive", Quincy, M.E. season 4, episode 7 (1978)
- "Dead and Alive", The Dukes of Hazzard season 6, episode 14 (1984)

== Other uses ==
- Schrödinger's cat, a thought experiment from quantum mechanics with a cat that may be simultaneously both alive and dead

== See also ==
- or
- or
- Dead Alive (disambiguation)
- Dead or Alive (disambiguation)
- The Alive and the Dead a 1964 film
