= Quincy, M.E. season 1 =

Quincy, M.E.
- Season 1
- No. of episodes: 4

Release
- Original network: NBC
- Original release: October 3, 1976 – January 2, 1977

Season chronology
- Next → Season 2

This is a list of episodes for the premiere season (1976–77) of the NBC television series Quincy, M.E..

The first seasons of this series were released on two DVDs together in a single box set by Universal Home Video.

These 75-minute episodes originally aired as part of the NBC Mystery Movie lineup. After the NBC Mystery Movie ended, the series continued on with the balance of season 1 as a one-hour show for the remaining episodes of that first season. When they were added to the syndicated lineup, they edited the four original eps to fit an hour slot and had the closing credits redone to remove the NBC Mystery Movie references, but all four original ones are included in their original versions on the DVDs.

== Episodes ==
No. overall	No. in season	Title	Directed by	Written by	Original release date	Prod. code
1	1	"Go Fight City Hall... to the Death!"	E.W. Swackhamer	Glen A. Larson & Lou Shaw	October 3, 1976	45572
Quincy investigates the murder of a civil servant that turns into a major web of conspiracy, embezzlement, and cover-ups in City Hall. Henry Darrow and George Wyner guest star.
2	2	"Who's Who in Neverland"	Steven H. Stern	Story by : Richard M. Powell; Teleplay by : Michael Kozoll & Richard M. Powell	October 10, 1976	45568
A famous celebrity reporter-turned-author turns up dead from cirrhosis, and Quincy has to determine if her death was caused by her reputed drinking or a murder. Carol Lynley and Dina Merrill guest star.
3	3	"A Star is Dead"	Noel Black	Lou Shaw & Michael Kozoll & Glen A. Larson	November 28, 1976	45570
A movie star is found dead, apparently of an overdose, and a congressman (and friend of Quincy) is suspected in the death. June Lockhart and Donna Mills guest star.
4	4	"Hot Ice, Cold Hearts"	Bruce Kessler	Sean Baine	January 2, 1977	45571
The suspicious death of a man from a deadly stonefish sting (uncommon in California waters) leads Quincy to investigate his death, over the objections of the local sheriff. Stuart Whitman guest stars.

== See also ==
List of The NBC Mystery Movie episodes
