= Quincy, M.E. season 3 =

Quincy, M.E.
- Season 3
- No. of episodes: 20

Release
- Original network: NBC
- Original release: September 16, 1977 – March 10, 1978

Season chronology
- ← Previous; Season 2 Next → Season 4

This is a list of episodes for the third season (1977–78) of the NBC television series Quincy, M.E..

Jack Klugman ended this season two episodes early due to exhaustion. NBC complied and dropped the additional two episodes so Klugman could rest up and return for the fourth season.

== Episodes ==
No. overall	No. in season	Title	Directed by	Written by	Original release date	Prod. code
18	1	"No Deadly Secret"	Jackie Cooper	Wallace Ware	September 16, 1977	48011
A friend of Quincy's, who looks to be badly beaten, collapses and dies beside Quincy's boat. Then the body disappears from the morgue after an autopsy is performed, and Quincy has to piece together what happened without the body. Keene Curtis and Ina Balin guest star.
19	2	"A Blow to the Head... a Blow to the Heart"	Corey Allen	Mann Rubin	September 23, 1977	48004
Quincy investigates the death of a boxer just minutes after a match, and suspects include his trainer and his opponent, who was dating the boxer's sister. Former heavyweight champion Joe Louis appears as himself.
20	3	"A Dead Man's Truth"	Vic Morrow	Adrian Leeds	September 30, 1977	48007
A rookie cop shoots and kills a suspected burglar, but Quincy must investigate when the autopsy results on the suspect don't match the policeman's story. Remakes the 1968 Dragnet episode "The Shooting Board". Dabney Coleman and Howard Hesseman guest star.
21	4	"A Question of Time"	Ray Danton	Irv Pearlberg	October 14, 1977	48005
Quincy investigates the death of a man in a hot tub at an alternative therapy center. Peter Mark Richman guest stars. (Note: This episode contains a disclaimer that "the drama and characters in it are fictional and no real persons are portrayed" just before the opening and closing credits).
22	5	"Death Casts a Vote"	Ron Staff	William Froug	October 21, 1977	48009
Quincy's investigation of the death of a union worker throws him into a fierce political battle when Quincy contends the death was murder, not suicide. James Gregory and Robert F. Simon guest star.
23	6	"Tissue of Truth"	Ray Danton	Max McClellan	October 28, 1977	48013
A young boy is kidnapped, and when the boy's captor is killed in a car accident, Quincy races against time to find the kid.
24	7	"Holding Pattern"	Ron Satlof	Story by : Adam Singer; Teleplay by : Robert Hamner	November 4, 1977	48017
A hijacked airplane with terrorists (and a deadly virus) on board lands at LAX, and Quincy must locate an antidote, as well as gain the trust of the hijackers.
25	8	"Main Man"	Ray Danton	S : Ray Danton; T : Irving Pearlberg	November 11, 1977	48026
When a high school football player dies from a genetic brain tumor, Quincy pleads with his father to prevent his younger brother (Scott Colomby) from playing in the championship game until he is tested for the same condition. Peter Brown guest stars.
26	9	"The Hero Syndrome"	Gerald Mayer	Albert Aley	November 18, 1977	48021
A tough loan shark is found murdered at the dock, and suspicion falls on a young loner (Robert Walker, Jr.) who becomes a hero among his fellow dock workers and refuses to be defended when Quincy determines he is innocent. Carmine Caridi and Maxine Stuart guest star.
27	10	"Touch of Death"	Alexander Singer	Joe Hyams & Pat Strong	December 2, 1977	48024
In an episode inspired by Bruce Lee's mysterious 1973 death, Sam's movie star cousin dies unexpectedly filming a martial-arts movie; however, Buddhist traditions forbid an autopsy, and Quincy's attempts to perform one angers both the local Japanese community as well as Sam. Keye Luke, Richard Narita, Mako, Harold Sakata and Joanna Kerns guest star.
28	11	"The Deadly Connection"	Alex March	Sheldon Stark	December 9, 1977	48003
Quincy is sent to Arizona to isolate the cause of a deadly outbreak in a small rural community, but encounters resistance both at the corporate level and with the local hospital administrators due to a cover-up.
29	12	"Last of the Dinosaurs"	Ray Danton	Leonard Stadd	December 16, 1977	48020
What seems to be an open-and-shut case of the sudden natural death of Quincy's favorite movie star turns into a murder investigation when inconsistencies with the autopsy results, witness statements, and a secret about the actor's health emerge. Carolyn Jones and Cameron Mitchell guest star.
30	13	"Crib Job"	Alex March	Milton S. Gelman	January 6, 1978	48022
When an elderly man is found dead, allegedly at the hands of a teenager who is a member of a support group that brings together teens and elderly and is by football star Rosey Grier, the legend asks Quincy to help the teen and save his organization.
31	14	"Matters of Life and Death"	Paul Krasny	Albert Aley	January 20, 1978	48030
Quincy's hot temper leads to Astin assigning him to relieve a small-town doctor, where he comes across an accident resulting in the death of an alleged drunk driver, and a widow prevented from receiving insurance benefits due to the incompetence of the town police chief, mortician, and doctor. Walter Brooke, John Fiedler, and Louise Latham guest star.
32	15	"Passing"	David Alexander	S : Lois Gibson; T : Samuel D. Shamsharoff; S/T : Mann Rubin	January 27, 1978	48023
In a story drawn from the disappearance of Jimmy Hoffa, Quincy and Sam find a human skull in the desert; after they hire a forensic artist (Zohra Lampert) and determine the skull was from a missing labor leader, his rival attempts to stop the investigation by injuring both the artist and Astin. Frank Maxwell and Michael Strong guest star. (Note: "Passing" refers to African-Americans "passing" as white).
33	16	"Accomplice to Murder"	Paul Krasny	Frank Telford	February 3, 1978	48031
When a woman dies after a mild fall interrupting a burglary, Quincy determines that her abusive husband may have contributed to her death, and that her previous reports of abuse were ignored by the police and her doctors. (Note: This episode reveals that Quincy's first name starts with an "R", but the full name was never revealed on-screen).
34	17	"Ashes to Ashes"	Herb Wallerstein	S : Charles McDaniel; T : Max Hodge	February 10, 1978	48028
In a case of a male "black widow", a young woman dies suddenly from a heart condition, and Quincy's suspicions are aroused when the husband doesn't seem too upset at her death, especially after finding out his previous wife also died suddenly and he is now preparing to marry again and leave the country.
35	18	"Gone But Not Forgotten"	Paul Krasny	Tom Sawyer & Reyn Parke	February 17, 1978	48033
After a suspect is arrested in the death of a prominent CEO, Quincy begins to uncover evidence that all points in the same direction and time frame — eight years in the past! John Colicos and Joan Van Ark guest star.
36	19	"Double Death"	Robert Douglas	Albert Aley	March 3, 1978	48037
Astin resigns after doing an autopsy (during a long night where 12 people perished in a fire) that Quincy determines a different result from, and the coroner has to find out what happened.
37	20	"Requiem for the Living"	Rowe Wallerstein	Story by : Ray Danton; Teleplay by : Irving Pearlberg	March 10, 1978	48039
In a story modeled after the movie D.O.A., Quincy and Sam are interrupted en route to a poker game by a mobster (John Vernon) who claims to be poisoned, has 24 hours to live, and demands a living autopsy to determine if he was poisoned or Quincy and Sam will die.
