= Mary Welch =

American actress

- Born: 1922; Charleston, South Carolina, U.S.
- Died: May 31, 1958 (aged 35–36); New York City, U.S.
- Occupation: Stage actress

Mary Welch (1922 – May 31, 1958) was an American stage actress on Broadway.

== Biography and career ==
Welch was born in Charleston, South Carolina, in 1922, later growing up in San Diego. She attended UCLA, where she won awards as a drama student. At UCLA, she earned degrees in English literature and drama. Welch later moved to New York in 1944, where she starred in her first Broadway play as Jo in an adaptation of Little Women. In 1947, she was a part of the Theatre Guild's play A Moon for the Misbegotten. She starred in the first production of A Streetcar Named Desire in 1947, replacing Kim Hunter. Welch later starred in The Solid Gold Cadillac (1953) and then was a part of Sunrise at Campobello (1957) at the time of her death. Her other roles include the plays The Joyous Season, Joy to the World, and Dream Girl. A clause in Welch's contract, from playwright Eugene O'Neill, for A Moon for the Misbegotten stated that she had to gain at least 50 pounds (23 kg) to reach 180 pounds (82 kg) for the role. O'Neill also originally stated that she looked too normal for the role.

Welch appeared in a few episodes of TV dramas in the 1950s, and in one notable movie role. In Park Row (1952), written and directed by Samuel Fuller, Welch plays the tough newspaper publisher who is the main character's rival... and then romantic interest. In his autobiography, Fuller said of Mary Welch, "She was a beautiful, self-possessed woman with an inner strength that shone through her personality."

== Personal life and death ==
Mary Welch was married to the actor David White. Welch died on May 31, 1958, at Mount Sinai Hospital from an internal hemorrhage that started while she was pregnant with her second child. She was a patient at the hospital for several weeks.

At the time of her death, she was performing in the production Sunrise at Campobello. Regarding Welch's earlier weight gain for A Moon for the Misbegotten, Harold Clurman of The Nation wrote, "This stupid and horrible clause may very well have led to the actress's death shortly after the play's production". In 2005, journalist Laura Shea wrote in The Eugene O'Neill Review, "While a significant, if temporary, weight gain is not beneficial to one's health, it is unlikely that this played a role in her untimely death over ten years after A Moon for the Misbegotten.

After her death, her husband raised their only child, Jonathan, who died on December 21, 1988, at the age of 33, in the bombing of Pan Am Flight 103 over Lockerbie, Scotland.
