= Quincy, M.E. season 4 =

Season of television series

Quincy, M.E.
- Season 4
- No. of episodes: 23

Release
- Original network: NBC
- Original release: September 21, 1978 – April 12, 1979

Season chronology
- ← Previous; Season 3 Next → Season 5

This is a list of episodes for the fourth season (1978–79) of the NBC television series Quincy, M.E..

== Episodes ==
No. overall	No. in season	Title	Directed by	Written by	Original release date	Prod. code
38	1	"The Last Six Hours"	Corey Allen	Steve Greenberg & Aubrey Solomon	September 21, 1978	51009
It's a race against the clock for Quincy when his investigation into the cause of death of a driver after a minor car accident leads to the spread of a deadly contagious infection and endangers Sam's life.
39	2	"Speed Trap"	Ron Satlof	S : Pamela Glasser; T : Steve Greenberg & Aubrey Solomon	October 12, 1978	51013
Life in the fast lane turns into a lap of death for a drug-fueled Grand Prix racing driver, but was his death the accident it seems to be? Quincy investigates a tale of high-stakes murder.
40	3	"A Test for Living"	Ron Satlof	T : Patrick Mathews & James Rosin; S/T : Jack Klugman	October 19, 1978	51002
For Quincy, the crime isn't theft or homicide, it's fighting against the system as he races to save an autistic boy destined for a harrowing existence at a home for the handicapped.
41	4	"Death by Good Intentions"	Ron Satlof	S : Howard Dimsdale & Michael Halperin; T : Robert Crais	October 26, 1978	51004
To save a hospital's affirmative-action program, Quincy must prove that the death of a patient was the result of foul play, not the misdiagnosis of a young doctor. If he can't, a promising career will be ruined. Brock Peters and Pernell Roberts guest star.
42	5	"Images"	Ray Danton	S : Ray Danton; T : Steve Greenberg & Aubrey Solomon	November 2, 1978	51019
Fact and fiction blur in the bizarre case of a television newswoman who is seemingly both dead and alive. Jessica Walter guest stars as both victim and murderer.
43	6	"Even Odds"	Ray Danton	Pamela Glasser	November 9, 1978	51014
During a robbery investigation, the suspect grabs a gun and begins wildly shooting. Quincy is gravely wounded, and while he's unconscious, Monahan, Sam and Astin have to use all their forensic experience to determine if the suspect or someone else shot Quincy.
44	7	"Dead and Alive"	Jim Benson	James Rosin	November 16, 1978	51008
When a van crashes into a gas station and explodes, the driver is assumed dead until his family starts receiving calls, allegedly from the driver, pleading for help. Quincy must determine if the calls are real or a sadistic hoax.
45	8	"No Way to Treat a Body"	Ron Satlof	Robert Crais & Bill Seal	November 30, 1978	51023
Who killed four ladies in a rickety boarding house, storing their mummified remains to cash in on their checks? Ed Begley, Jr., Marj Dusay, and Bibi Osterwald guest star.
46	9	"A Night to Raise the Dead"	Gene Nelson	S : Peter J. Thompson; T : Michael Halperin	December 7, 1978	51015
When the dead are raised during a torrential rainstorm, Quincy must hold back a killer tidal wave when an epidemic of typhoid is discovered, and a candidate for state senate uses his influence to block Quincy's investigation. Greg Morris guest stars.
47	10	"A Question of Death"	Ray Danton	S : Peter J. Thompson & Robert Crais; S/T : Steve Greenberg & Aubrey Solomon	January 4, 1979	51022
In an episode that explores the controversy of when death occurs, Quincy faces a multi-million-dollar lawsuit when he becomes embroiled in the transplant of live organs from a dead patient. He encounters an unscrupulous lawyer who (along with the donor's family) felt Quincy rushed the donor's death to obtain the organs. Logan Ramsey guest stars.
48	11	"House of No Return"	Harvey S. Laidman	S : Deborah Klugman; T : Aubrey Solomon; S/T : Steve Greenberg	January 11, 1979	51025
When a patient at an institute for mentally-disordered criminals ends up beaten to death, Quincy goes undercover to investigate a wave of "human cockfights" at the hands of the administration and the guards. Virginia Capers, Herbie Faye, and James McEachin guest star.
49	12	"A Small Circle of Friends"	Peter J. Thompson	S : Jack Morton; S/T : Steve Greenberg & Aubrey Solomon	January 18, 1979	51021
A penicillin-resistant strain of gonorrhea is discovered in a deceased playboy football player's body, and it's a race to discover the victims before it becomes an epidemic. Jo Ann Pflug guest stars.
50	13	"The Depth of Beauty"	Ray Danton	S : Barbara Evans; S/T : Robert Crais	January 25, 1979	51027
Quincy's attempts to expose a plastic surgeon whose incompetence led to the death of two women and the disfigurement of a prominent actress is thwarted by government red tape, a reluctant district attorney and an injunction from the Federal Trade Commission. Jane Greer guest stars.
51 52	14 15	"Walk Softly Through the Night: Parts 1 & 2"	Paul Krasny	David Moessinger	February 1, 1979	51091 51092
Quincy's old friend loses his 19-year-old son to a drug overdose, and joins up with a young drug counselor (A Martinez) at the college the boy attended to track down the source of the drugs, a Los Angeles physician running a pill shop. When the physician responsible for the death of Quincy's friend's son is found shot to death, suspicion falls on the young drug counselor Quincy has been working with, until a letter written before the son's death reveals a family secret. (NOTE: The episode was originally two hours in length but is cut into two parts for syndication.)
53	16	"Aftermath"	Tony Mordente	S : Peter J. Thompson; T : Steve Greenberg & Aubrey Solomon	February 7, 1979	51018
Quincy's investigation into a deadly airplane crash finds passengers and members of the flight crew stricken with lung cancer due to the effects of materials manufactured at a plant that is about to go nationwide.
54	17	"Dark Angel"	Ray Danton	Robert Crais	February 7, 1979	51029
When a young man dies — apparently at the hands of the police — Quincy has to determine if the cause of death was police brutality or the use of Angel Dust. Neville Brand and William Daniels guest star.
55	18	"Physician, Heal Thyself"	Corey Allen	Steve Greenberg & Aubrey Solomon	February 22, 1979	51031
A doctor (John Dehner) is under suspicion of performing an abortion while drunk, costing the life of the mother. Quincy rushes (while encountering political and professional red tape) to obtain an exhumation of an earlier stillborn baby and to stop another potential death. June Lockhart and Anne Francis guest star.
56	19	"Promises to Keep"	Harvey S. Laidman	S : Jack Klugman; T : Erich Collier	March 1, 1979	51032
Quincy is about to marry his girlfriend Lynne (Sharon Acker), but he is haunted by memories of his beloved wife Helen (Anita Gillette, who would play his second wife, Dr. Emily Hanover, in Season 8) and the circumstances that led to her death.
57	20	"Semper-Fidelis"	Tony Mordente	S : Maurice Klugman; T : Robert Crais	March 15, 1979	51033
When a Marine private dies during an unauthorized night march, Quincy is brought in by his Navy friend to see if a decorated Vietnam Vet Drill Instructor was responsible for his death. James Luisi guest stars.
58	21	"An Ounce of Prevention"	Kenneth Gilbert	S : Larry Tuch & Sol Weisel; S/T : Steve Greenberg & Aubrey Solomon & Robert Crais	March 22, 1979	51035
In an episode drawn from the Love Canal disaster, a healthy construction worker dies in a fall and the cause of death appears to be related to toxins found in the soil of a village. Quincy must go up against a wall of corporate greed to stop the contamination before more lives are in jeopardy.
59	22	"The Death Challenge"	Ron Satlof	Richard M. Bluel & Pat Fielder	March 24, 1979	51007
The death of a man performing Houdini's water escape leads Quincy to investigate his old magician friend (Don Ameche) to determine if he, or someone else, is responsible for the death. Ann Blyth and Jo Ann Pflug guest star.
60	23	"The Eye of the Needle"	Ron Satlof	T : Robert Crais; S/T : A.L. Christopher	April 12, 1979	51005
A doctor practicing holistic medicine is blamed for the death of a patient, and it's up to Quincy to determine if a doctor's career will be ended due to her beliefs.

== Ratings ==
The show ranked 50th out of 114 shows for the 1978-79 season, with a 17.4 rating and a 27 share.
