= Quincy, M.E. season 8 =

Quincy, M.E.
- Season 8
- No. of episodes: 24

Release
- Original network: NBC
- Original release: September 29, 1982 – May 11, 1983

Season chronology
- ← Previous; Season 7

This is a list of episodes for the eighth and final season (1982–83) of the NBC television series Quincy, M.E..

In this season, Anita Gillette joins the cast as Dr. Emily Hanover, and the opening theme is again rearranged to sound more electronic.

== Episodes ==
No. overall	No. in season	Title	Directed by	Written by	Original release date	Prod. code
125	1	"Baby Rattlesnakes"	Georg Fenady	Jeri Taylor	September 29, 1982	57018
A young girl is killed in a drive-by shooting, and a 14-year-old boy (on probation for gang activity) is arrested for the killing, though he denies any involvement. Quincy, Emily, and the boy's probation officer (Gregory Sierra) seek to prove the boy's innocence before the officer's program to get kids out of the gang lifestyle is shut down by a politician up for reelection.
126	2	"Ghost of a Chance"	Ray Danton	Steve Greenberg, Aubrey Solomon	October 6, 1982	57009
The practice of "ghost surgery" (having a young resident do an operation in place of an experienced surgeon) is explored after a man dies from complications during routine bypass surgery, and the man's brother pays for an autopsy to determine who is responsible.
127	3	"Give Me Your Weak"	Georg Fenady	Sam Egan	October 27, 1982	57027
In a sequel to Season 6's "Seldom Silent, Never Heard", a young mother is suffering from myoclonus, and is having problems getting the medication she needs. Quincy and Dr. Arthur Ciotti (Michael Constantine, reprising his role) once again take on the drug companies and the government to get the Orphan Drug Act passed so she can obtain the life-saving medication. Joseph Campanella and Simon Oakland] also star. Note: three months after this episode aired, the Orphan Drug Act of 1983 was signed into law by President Ronald Reagan.
128	4	"Dying for a Drink"	Georg Fenady	Michael Braverman	November 3, 1982	57017
Quincy's friend and fellow medical examiner (Ina Balin) is allowing her alcoholism to interfere with her work, resulting in numerous mistakes in autopsies. She needs assistance from a support group to help pull her out of the cycle of alcohol addiction.
129	5	"Unreasonable Doubt"	Richard Benedict	Lee Sheldon	November 10, 1982	57008
The cause of death of a baby diagnosed with Sturge–Weber syndrome is in dispute with Quincy and an up-and-coming disabled pathologist (John Rubinstein), who Quincy feels is taking the case personally due to his disability.
130	6	"Sleeping Dogs"	Georg Fenady	Preston Wood	November 17, 1982	57013
Quincy is called to testify in the small-town murder trial of a sadistic, ruthless man (Brion James). When he is shot dead, six townspeople all admit to the killing, and Quincy has to go through the town's indifferent police chief (John Anderson) and the group of townspeople to get to the truth.
131	7	"Science for Sale"	Ray Danton	S : Diana Marcus & Chris Abbott & Nancy Faulkner; T : Erich Collier	November 24, 1982	57014
A doctor using a genetically engineered form of the SV40 virus to create a possible cure for cancer may have inadvertently created a deadly virus when a cancer patient and anyone she was in contact with dies. Quincy has to find a cure for the virus while battling the large corporation underwriting the doctor's research.
132	8	"Next Stop, Nowhere"	Ray Danton	Sam Egan	December 1, 1982	57010
The alleged link between music lyrics and anti-social behavior is explored when a teenager dies while dancing in a punk rock club to a band whose lyrics glorify death and violence. Emily and Quincy both feel the boy's death was indirectly related to the music (an ice pick to the neck was the direct cause). Spotlighting the lyrics' content, Quincy looks for evidence as to who really killed the boy.
133	9	"Across the Line"	Georg Fenady	Fred McKnight	December 8, 1982	57007
After a hostage is shot by a police officer (Jack Kehoe) during an attempted robbery, the officer goes to Quincy for his expert forensic skills to defend him at his Board of Rights hearing to determine if the shooting is justified or not.
134	10	"Sword of Honor, Blade of Death"	Ray Danton	Michael Braverman	December 15, 1982	57028
Sam's friend, an LAPD officer working in the Asian Task Force, is killed while undercover trying to get evidence on the Japanese Yakuza, and Sam fears that his friend's father will exact revenge (per the old Japanese Code of Honor) and attempts to stop him before he becomes another Yakuza casualty.
135	11	"The Law Is a Fool"	Georg Fenady	S : Jack Klugman; T : David Karp	January 5, 1983	57016
A man who kidnapped a young girl offers a ransom demand: That he be tried and acquitted of the crime (invoking double jeopardy) and $500,000 in cash in exchange for the girl, all the while thwarting efforts by Quincy and Monahan to find her by not revealing any information.
136	12	"Guilty Until Proven Innocent"	Ray Danton	Allison Hock	January 12, 1983	57023
An overzealous federal prosecutor uses the inherent flaws in the Federal Grand Jury system to prosecute Ted Locke, a friend of Quincy's, for arson, murder, and mail fraud after a fire destroys his furniture warehouse and kills someone inside. Quincy fights back against the prosecutor's tactics (including revealing that Locke is, in reality, the son of a deceased crime boss) and is thrown in jail for his efforts.
137	13	"Cry for Help"	Ray Austin	Jeri Taylor	January 19, 1983	57029
The issue of teenage suicide is explored as a young girl is found dead on a roadside from suicide, and Quincy asks Emily to do a psychological autopsy and finds just how many signals of the girl's suicidal feelings were missed by her teachers, friends, and parents, and the girl's boyfriend (part of a suicide pact but failed to go through with it) may be the next suicide unless Quincy & Emily stop him.
138	14	"A Loss for Words"	Georg Fenady	Sam Egan	January 26, 1983	57036
An industrial accident claims the life of a young boy, which investigation shows was functionally illiterate (and was unable to read the warning signs at the plant). Quincy investigates both the accident and the fact that the boy, as well as the lead investigator on the case, could graduate high school and not be able to read.
139	15	"Beyond the Open Door"	Georg Fenady	David Moessinger	February 2, 1983	57015
The "hit-and-run" strangler kills several young women, and Quincy and the police turn to a psychic to help locate the killer before he strikes again.
140	16	"On Dying High"	Ray Danton	Michael Braverman	February 9, 1983	57037
After a comedian/singer (Roger Miller) is badly burned after freebasing cocaine backstage (an incident loosely based on the 1980 incident involving Richard Pryor), Quincy speaks with a narcotics detective and finds the drug problem in Los Angeles is out of control, and the coroner is determined to do all what can be done to stop it.
141	17	"Quincy's Wedding: Part 1"	David Moessinger	Jeri Taylor	February 16, 1983	57038
Emily hires a no-nonsense wedding planner to get her upcoming wedding to Quincy in order. A bizarre case of an elderly wife confessing to killing her husband, after an autopsy declared his death from natural causes at a rest home, has Quincy so occupied that he misses his and Emily's wedding shower and rehearsal, prompting Emily to call off the wedding.
142	18	"Quincy's Wedding: Part 2"	Jeri Taylor	Jeri Taylor	February 23, 1983	57039
Emily's mother (June Lockhart) arrives to try to save the wedding, but Emily refuses until Quincy decides he wants to remarry and sells his beloved boat. Meanwhile Quincy seems more interested in the case involving the elderly woman and how she thinks her family members are out to get her like they did her husband.
143	19	"Murder on Ice"	Mel Ferber	Lee Sheldon	March 9, 1983	57019
A wedding present from a judge (and friend of Quincy's) brings the newlyweds to his ski lodge for a private honeymoon, but when they arrive Quincy and Emily discover there are other guests already at the lodge who all share a common thread; all were involved in the same case of an embezzler years ago who escaped from jail. When the guests starting disappearing one by one — including the judge, who is found dead in his car — Quincy and Emily fear the fugitive is out to kill them all.
144	20	"Women of Valor"	Georg Fenady	Sebastian Milito, Deborah Klugman	March 16, 1983	57035
The debate over the use of midwives and alternative birth methods is explored when a midwife is called to assist in a difficult birth, when the baby is rushed to a hospital and dies (at the same hospital who turned away a Medicaid mother in labor and that baby died en route to a county hospital), the midwife is prosecuted for murder, and Quincy is brought in to perform an autopsy on the baby the midwife delivered to determine if she truly is responsible for the death.
145	21	"Suffer the Little Children"	William Cairncross	David Karp	March 23, 1983	57025
Quincy's fishing holiday is interrupted when Dr. Astin requests he visit a home for children to assist in the autopsy of a young boy who died there, and finds the home's conditions extremely sub-standard and arrange for its closure. Emily wants to help the boy's brother (who has emotional and behavioral problems caused, as Emily finds out, by his abusive father) by bringing the boy back to his family to work through their issues together to stop the boy's descent into a potentially criminal life. Tony Dow guest-stars.
146	22	"An Act of Violence"	Michael Braverman	Michael Braverman	April 27, 1983	57040
After an elderly woman is killed by a punk trying to rob her, Quincy goes to the crime scene to investigate and is himself attacked and mugged by the same punk, which results in Quincy becoming fearful of any noise or darkness, and Emily has to help her husband overcome his fears and find the killer responsible. Note: This episode marks the final appearance of Danny (Val Bisoglio) in the series.
147	23	"Whatever Happened to Morris Perlmutter?"	Sam Egan	Sam Egan	May 4, 1983	57041
An elderly woman (in the advanced stages of Alzheimer's disease) is shot to death by a burglar in her home. The woman's sister, along with another man, Morris Perlmutter (Keenan Wynn), were vaudeville stars that Quincy saw in his younger days, but Morris feels his advancing age and resulting forgetfulness will prevent him from making a comeback on television, and turns to Emily and Quincy for help. Rosemary DeCamp guest-stars. Note: This episode marks the final appearances of Dr. Astin (John S. Ragin), Sam (Robert Ito), Monahan (Garry Walberg), and Brill (Joseph Roman).
148	24	"The Cutting Edge"	Georg Fenady	Jeri Taylor	May 11, 1983	57044
A young father loses his arm in a serious work accident. The man and his severed arm are taken to an experimental treatment center, Experiment Hope, where the doctor-in-charge (Barry Newman) utilizes revolutionary medical techniques to re-attach the severed limb and help the man return to a normal life with full use of his arm. Note: The series finale was a failed backdoor pilot for a new series that would have featured Anita Gillette in her Emily Hanover character in a new medical series.
