= Wanted Dead or Alive =

Wanted dead or alive is a phrase found on wanted posters which has inspired many works of popular culture.

Wanted dead or alive may also refer to:

== Film and television ==
- Wanted: Dead or Alive (1951 film), an American western film
- Wanted Dead or Alive (TV series), a 1958–1961 TV series starring Steve McQueen
- Wanted: Dead or Alive (1986 film), a sequel to the TV series
- Wanted: Dead or Alive (1984 film), a Hindi-language film
- "Wanted: Dead or Alive" (Pretty Little Liars), a 2016 episode of Pretty Little Liars

== Music ==
=== Albums ===
- Wanted Dead or Alive (EP), a 1997 EP by Altamont
- Wanted Dead or Alive (David Bromberg album) (1974)
- Wanted Dead or Alive (Luni Coleone album) (2002)
- Wanted: Dead or Alive (Kool G Rap & DJ Polo album) (1990)
- Wanted Dead or Alive (Warren Zevon album) (1969)

=== Songs ===
- "Wanted Dead or Alive" (Bon Jovi song) (1986)
- "Wanted Dead or Alive" (Tupac Shakur and Snoop Doggy Dogg song) (1997)

== Other uses ==
- Desperados: Wanted Dead or Alive, a video game
- Spider-Man: Wanted: Dead or Alive, a 1998 novel
- Wanted: Dead, a 2023 cyberpunk video game

== See also ==
- Dead or Alive (disambiguation)
