= Dead Alive (disambiguation) =

Dead Alive (also known as Braindead) is a comedy horror film by Peter Jackson.

Dead Alive may also refer to:

- Dead Alive (album), an album by Soul Embraced
- Dead Alive!, an album by the Misfits
- "Dead Alive", a song by The Shins on Heartworms
- "Deadalive", an episode of The X-Files
- The Dead Alive, an 1874 novella written by Wilkie Collins, also called John Jago's Ghost

== See also ==
- Dead or Alive (disambiguation)
- Dead and Alive (disambiguation)
- 9 Dead Alive, an album by Mexican guitar duo Rodrigo y Gabriela
- Bose: Dead/Alive, an Indian historical drama web television miniseries
- Silent Hill: Dead/Alive, a collected edition from Silent Hills comics
