= Quincy, M.E. season 7 =

Quincy, M.E.
- Season 7
- No. of episodes: 24

Release
- Original network: NBC
- Original release: October 28, 1981 – May 12, 1982

Season chronology
- ← Previous; Season 6 Next → Season 8

This is a list of episodes for the seventh season (1981–82) of the NBC television series Quincy, M.E..

The opening theme is once again rearranged to sound similar to Season 5's opening, and the role is now shown with the regular cast credits (e.g., Garry Walberg as Lt. Monahan and John S. Ragin as Astin)

== Episodes ==
No. overall	No. in season	Title	Directed by	Written by	Original release date	Prod. code
101	1	"Memories of Allison"	Georg Fenady	Sam Egan	October 28, 1981	56805
A woman fleeing from an unknown person falls down an escalator at a high school job fair and suffers from amnesia, which prevents Quincy from determining who was chasing her and why someone wants her dead.
102	2	"The Golden Hour"	Georg Fenady	Sebastian Milito, Deborah Klugman	November 4, 1981	56801
A father and daughter injured in a car accident have very different outcomes; the father survived serious injuries at a trauma center and the daughter died from less serious ones at a closer, but non-trauma, emergency room. When hearing the trauma center may have to close due to red ink, Quincy spurs into action to stop the closing and prove the need for more trauma centers.
103	3	"Slow Boat to Madness: Part 1"	Daniel Haller	Sam Egan, Marc Scott Taylor	November 11, 1981	56803
Quincy and Dr. Janet Carlyle (Diana Muldaur, reprising her role from Season 5's "Deadly Arena") go on a cruise to Tahiti, but the vacation proves to be anything but relaxing as the coroner gets involved in a murder investigation that leads to the discovery of a potentially deadly disease on board. Mimi Rogers guest stars.
104	4	"Slow Boat to Madness: Part 2"	Daniel Haller	Sam Egan, Marc Scott Taylor	November 18, 1981	56804
While Quincy and Dr. Janet Carlyle (Diana Muldaur) work to discover the root cause of the illness that has infected their cruise ship, Sam & Mark land on an island to rescue a couple who swam to shore from the island's military installation.
105	5	"D.U.I."	Georg Fenady	Michael Braverman	December 2, 1981	56807
In an episode that exposes the weakness in DUI laws in the early 1980s, a prominent lawyer (with a blood-alcohol level of 0.21) hits and kills a pedestrian, and when Quincy discovers the driver will only receive probation and a small fine, the coroner is determined to change the law, but later changes gears when his investigation veers from DUI to murder.
106	6	"For Want of a Horse"	Ray Danton	Jeri Taylor	December 9, 1981	56802
The landowner of an equine therapy ranch for handicapped children is murdered by the landowner's nephew, but the murder is observed by a mute child who works at the ranch, and the nephew plots to eliminate the witness. Meanwhile, Dr. Astin's foster son (in a wheelchair after an auto accident that killed his parents) is having trouble adjusting to his new life until the boy is sent to the ranch.
107	7	"Gentle Into That Good Night"	David Moessinger	Jeri Taylor	December 16, 1981	56806
Searching for a way to improve the way he interacts with grief-stricken family members, Quincy seeks advice from Dr. Pendleton (Michael Constantine), a psychiatrist who counsels people with terminal illnesses, and is put to the test when he has to assist a dying cancer patient (Tyne Daly) whose husband is resisting her efforts to die peacefully.
108	8	"Dead Stop"	Ray Danton	Linda Cowgill	December 23, 1981	56812
A truck driver moonlighting in illegally dumping phosphorus trichloride dies after coming in contact with the toxic waste, and Quincy must race to determine where the chemical is dumped before the rains come, and the waste turns into deadly hydrogen chloride gas.
109	9	"Bitter Pill"	Georg Fenady	Sam Egan, David Chomsky	January 2, 1982	56818
The death of a teen-aged basketball player from so-called "look-alike" pep pills (made from OTC ingredients) drives Quincy to organize community action to close a store that sells the highly dangerous, but legal, pills.
110	10	"Guns Don't Die"	Bob Bender	Jeri Taylor	January 13, 1982	56820
A mysterious "Saturday night special" gun is responsible for the deaths of a man, a young boy, and a cop, and Quincy is determined to find the gun to stop the carnage; in a twist ending the stolen gun is returned to its owner but the weapon accidentally causes the death of a young child.
111	11	"When Luck Ran Out"	Georg Fenady	Paul Haggard Jr., Jo Lynne Michael	January 20, 1982	56810
The death of a prized racehorse belonging to a friend of Quincy's puts the coroner at odds with his girlfriend, an insurance investigator assigned to determine if the horse's death was natural or part of a fraud scheme worth $2 million — and a dead horse vet also plays into the mix.
112	12	"Smoke Screen"	Georg Fenady	Michael McGreevey	January 27, 1982	56816
After a deliberately set fire at a hotel kills 12 people (an event loosely based on the 1980 MGM Grand fire), Quincy's investigation of the deaths leads him to a group who tries to cure arsonists of their urge to set fires and an insurance investigator whom Quincy enlists to find the arsonist responsible. Gerald S. O'Loughlin guest stars.
113	13	"For Love of Joshua"	David Moessinger	Michael Braverman	February 3, 1982	56819
A baby with Down's Syndrome is allowed to starve to death by a doctor (Allan Arbus) who feels Down's babies are a drain on medical, emotional, and financial resources, and another doctor (Colleen Dewhurst) feels the baby's intentional lack of treatment is grounds for murder. Quincy's investigation reveals how Down's children are treated in the world, and he visits a family (Tyne Daly and Clu Gulager) who care for six such children in their home.
114	14	"Into the Murdering Mind"	Georg Fenady	Michael Braverman; Linda J. Cowgill	February 10, 1982	56824
A young man diagnosed with schizophrenia brutally murders his father, brother, and sister, but Quincy feels the man is faking his mental illness to get away with murder and sets out to prove it. Conchata Ferrell guest stars as the young man's mother.
115	15	"To Clear the Air"	Lester Wm. Berke	Sam Egan	February 17, 1982	56822
The death of an elderly man walking during a smog alert may be linked to emissions from oil refineries near the sanitarium where the man was staying, and Quincy works to prove the connection to force the refineries to cut back their emissions during periods of high smog.
116	16	"The Shadow of Death"	Georg Fenady	Jeri Taylor	February 24, 1982	56823
A former nurse who served in the Vietnam War (and suffering from PTSD) is found dead. Her best friend, another Vietnam Vet nurse, is also suffering from the effects of PTSD, and Quincy works with her to find her friend's killer and to get her the help she needs to deal with the nightmares of her Vietnam experiences — while learning just how harshly Vietnam Vets were treated by the public and the government after the war ended.
117	17	"The Flight of the Nightingale"	William Cairncross	Gene Church, E. Paul Edwards	March 3, 1982	56815
After a veteran nurse (Georgann Johnson) is accused of and suspended for administering medication without a doctor's order and resulting in the death of a patient, the rest of the nurses go on a sympathy strike to protest the treatment and low wages of the nursing staff. Meanwhile, Quincy and Astin work together to clear the nurse's name and end the strike, all the while dealing with Astin's wife undergoing surgery at the same hospital. David Ruprecht (Supermarket Sweep) guest stars.
118	18	"Stolen Tears"	Georg Fenady	Sam Egan	March 17, 1982	56825
A Holocaust survivor is run down and killed after recognizing his Nazi tormentor, and his friend Hyam (Martin Balsam), who runs a Holocaust museum, tries to convince Quincy that the act was murder, all the while dealing with an influential Holocaust denier (Norman Lloyd).
119	19	"The Face of Fear"	Bob Bender	Michael Braverman	March 24, 1982	56827
While walking her dog along the beach, a woman suffering from agoraphobia witnesses a murder, and Quincy must find her before her affliction forces her back into the solitude of her home that she had not left for seven years and thereby allowing the killer to go free. Dixie Carter and Jonathan Frakes guest star.
120	20	"Expert in Murder"	Michael J. Kane	Sam Egan, Marc Scott Taylor	March 31, 1982	56832
The boss of a major crime family is to go on trial. Quincy and another witness are prepared to testify against him, but the witness is killed and Quincy's reputation is impugned to the point that, unless more evidence is unearthed, the boss will go free.
121	21	"The Unquiet Grave"	Georg Fenady	Jeri Taylor	April 7, 1982	56831
A big-time politician (George Gaynes) is found dead in his home after hosting a party, and the investigation turns to the politician's wife (Ina Balin); she was once Quincy's college sweetheart, but he left her because he felt she was psychotic, and he fears she killed her husband to win Quincy back.
122	22	"The Last of Leadbottom"	Michael Braverman	Michael Braverman	April 28, 1982	56834
Rear Admiral McKenzie, an old colleague of Quincy's, dies while opening a naval museum named after him. A simple autopsy causes confusion for Quincy and Astin when they encounter a naval commander desperately wanting to take possession of the body, three "Mrs. McKenzies," and the presence of a microchip in his stomach. Soon Quincy has his naval reserve status reactivated and finds himself involved in a cat and mouse game of espionage and counter espionage.
123	23	"Deadly Protection"	Paul Krasny	Michael McGreevey, Fred Long	May 5, 1982	56828
A young girl is mauled by her family dog, and Quincy's investigation leads him to a trainer using extreme and abusive methods to train their protection dogs — and during the investigation adopts a dog. Frank Marth guest stars.
124	24	"The Mourning After"	Jeri Taylor	Sam Egan	May 12, 1982	56835
The death of a college student during a hazing stunt leads Quincy to a fraternity who seem more interested in covering up what they did than cooperating, and the revelation that, most likely, none of them will go to jail for the death. Meanwhile, the deceased's family are having trouble handling the enormity of the loss. Steve Antin guest stars.
