= Quincy, M.E. season 2 =

Quincy, M.E.
- Season 2
- No. of episodes: 13

Release
- Original network: NBC
- Original release: February 4 – May 27, 1977

Season chronology
- ← Previous; Season 1 Next → Season 3

This is a list of episodes for the second season (1977) of the NBC television series Quincy, M.E..

The first two seasons of this series were released on DVD together in a single box set by Universal Home Video.

== Episodes ==
No. overall	No. in season	Title	Directed by	Written by	Original release date	Prod. code
5	1	"Snake Eyes"	Joel Oliansky	Story by : Lou Shaw; Teleplay by : Joel Oliansky & Michael Sloan	February 4, 1977	45573/45574
6	2	"Snake Eyes"	Joel Oliansky	Story by : Lou Shaw; Teleplay by : Joel Oliansky & Michael Sloan	February 4, 1977	45573/45574
In a story based on the then-recent outbreak of Legionnaires' disease, a mysterious illness strikes dozens of guests at a Lake Tahoe resort where Quincy and Lee are attending a forensic investigator's convention. Quincy continues to work with the doctors in Lake Tahoe to determine the cause of the mysterious illness that has killed or sickened dozens of guests, and it turns out the murderer was one of their own. Van Johnson, Buddy Hackett, and Jo Ann Pflug guest star. NOTE: This was the first two-hour episode of the series. It was divided into two parts for syndication.
7	3	"...The Thigh Bone's Connected to the Knee Bone..."	Alex March	Story by : Tony Lawrence & Lou Shaw; Teleplay by : Lou Shaw	February 11, 1977	45569
Quincy and a group of medical school students work on a cold murder case after they find a femur bone with a gunshot mark at a construction site. Fred Grandy appears as a student. (Note: This episode marks the final appearance of Lynette Mettey as Lee, Quincy's girlfriend, and the final episode as part of the NBC Mystery Movie series).
8	4	"Visitors in Paradise"	Ivan Dixon	Michael Sloan	February 18, 1977	46906
Quincy's and Danny's fishing trip in the town of Paradise turns into a murder investigation which some members of the town, including the sheriff (Pernell Roberts) tries to prevent Quincy from working on. Jack Kelly guest stars and Jamie Lee Curtis made her acting debut as a girl in a changing room that Quincy opened by mistake looking for someone else.
9	5	"The Two Sides of Truth"	Ron Satlof	Gene Thompson	February 25, 1977	46909
A death investigation in a refinery fire brings Quincy into conflict with his former pathology professor and mentor who now has become a witness-for-hire.
10	6	"Hit and Run at Danny's"	Alvin Ganzer	Gregory S. Dinallo	March 11, 1977	46904
Quincy has to find out who was responsible for a hit-and-run accident at Danny's place, but there are some government officials who would rather keep the person's identity secret.
11	7	"Has Anybody Here Seen Quincy?"	Steven H. Stern	Michael Sloan & Glen A. Larson	March 18, 1977	46916
Quincy is nowhere to be found when a corpse brought into the morgue isn't as dead as believed, Monahan investigates a diamond smuggling case, and a boy with unique symptoms arrives at the hospital. Bob Crane, Yuki Shimoda, and Louise Sorel guest star. NOTE: Jack Klugman does not appear in the episode (for the only time in the series) because he disliked the script, and the incident began the process of Glen A. Larson leaving the show at the end of the season. Guest stars Bob Crane who is well known for his starring role in Hogan's Heroes and this came three episodes after Visitors in Paradise directed by his Hogan's Heroes co-star Ivan Dixon.
12	8	"A Good Smack in the Mouth"	Jackie Cooper	Story by : Glen A. Larson & Jack Klugman; Teleplay by : Gregory S. Dinallo	April 15, 1977	46923
Dr. Asten's wife picks up a hitchhiking child and is involved in an auto accident; however, Quincy determines some of the boy's injuries occurred before the crash, and he immediately suspects the parents of child abuse. NOTE: Barbara Babcock guest stars as Dr Asten's wife Melissa. Despite Dr Asten being a regular character throughout the series, this is the only time that Melissa Asten appears.
13	9	"The Hot Dog Murder"	Alex March	B.W. Sandefur	April 22, 1977	46907
A university medical student uncovers evidence (including a hot dog) that a body donated to the university was actually a murder victim.
14	10	"An Unfriendly Radiance"	Corey Allen	Rudolph Bochert	April 29, 1977	46911
The unusual cause of death of an auto accident victim results in the arrest of an innocent man, and Quincy attempts to clear his name by investigating the source of radiation exposure the victim received before his death.
15	11	"Sullied Be Thy Name"	Jackie Cooper	Story by : Gregory S. Dinallo; Teleplay by : Gregory S. Dinallo & Irving Pearlberg	May 6, 1977	46926
A politically active priest is found dead of natural causes in the bed of a prostitute, and Quincy attempts to find out how he got there. Joseph Campanella and John Saxon guest star.
16	12	"Valleyview"	Ron Satlof	Story by : Susan Woolen; Teleplay by : Susan Woolen & Irving Pearlberg	May 13, 1977	46908
People are dying of heart problems at Valleyview Sanitarium, except the deceased had no heart problems, and this leads Quincy to search for a potential "Angel of Death" inside the well-respected facility. Carolyn Jones guest stars.
17	13	"Let Me Light the Way"	David Moessinger	Story by : David Moessinger & Carole Saraceno; Teleplay by : David Moessinger	May 27, 1977	46925
A series of rapes in Los Angeles results in the death of a nurse. Quincy and Monahan search for the rapist, but the investigation is hindered by an incompetent doctor and nurse. The case becomes personal to Quincy when the rapist attacks a rape counselor the coroner has gotten close to. Adrienne Barbeau and Kim Cattrall guest star.
