= Park Row (film) =

1952 film by Samuel Fuller

- Directed by: Samuel Fuller
- Written by: Samuel Fuller
- Produced by: Samuel Fuller
- Starring: Gene Evans; Mary Welch; Bela Kovacs
- Cinematography: John L. Russell
- Edited by: Philip Cahn
- Music by: Paul Dunlap
- Distributed by: United Artists
- Release date: September 1, 1952 (World première in Los Angeles)
- Running time: 83 min.
- Country: United States
- Language: English
- Budget: $200,000

Park Row is a 1952 American independent drama film starring Gene Evans as a New York City journalist who founds a new type of newspaper in the 1880s and Mary Welch as the established publisher who opposes him. It was written, directed, produced and financed by Samuel Fuller, himself a New York reporter prior to turning to filmmaking. It was his favorite film, though it did not do well at the box office.

The title refers to the street in Manhattan where most of New York City's newspapers were located.

== Plot ==
In 1886, reporter Phineas Mitchell is fired from The Star newspaper for criticizing its methods and philosophy. When his friends stand up for him, they too are discharged. As the newly unemployed men are drowning their sorrows in a bar, Steve Brodie rushes in, claiming to have survived a jump off the Brooklyn Bridge and insisting that Mitchell write an article about it and make him famous. Mitchell tells him he no longer has a newspaper job.

Then acquaintance Charles A. Leach tells Mitchell that he had always dreamed of going into journalism. Leach makes a startling proposition: that they become partners and launch a new newspaper. Leach has a printing press, vacant offices and enough money to get started. Mitchell accepts and hires his friends on the spot, including aged but veteran reporter Josiah Davenport and eager youngster Rusty. He decides to name the newspaper The Globe. When a policeman comes looking for Brodie, Mitchell drags the hiding fugitive out from behind the bar. Now Mitchell has the front-page story for the first issue.

Charity Hackett (Mary Welch), the young, ruthless publisher of The Star, at first dismisses her new rival, but soon becomes concerned. Mitchell has many revolutionary ideas. Despite The Globe's precarious finances (it is printed on cheap materials at hand, including butcher paper), it instantly becomes very popular for the subjects it fearlessly tackles. When she visits its offices, she encounters Ottmar Mergenthaler, who is busy inventing the Linotype machine to automate the slow, laborious process of setting type by hand. She tries to recruit Mergenthaler for The Star, but fails.

Eventually, Hackett visits Mitchell, working late at the office, and proposes a merger. Mitchell takes her in his arms and kisses her, but rejects her offer. She orders the second-in-command at her publication to cut off supplies of ink and paper to The Globe. He goes further than she had intended: men are beaten up, and Rusty is run over by a heavy wagon. Mitchell confronts Hackett and tells her that Rusty may have to have his legs amputated. He does not believe her when she claims she did not mean for things to go this far, and that she has fired the man responsible.

When Mitchell learns that France's gift of the Statue of Liberty has not been erected because of lack of funds to build a pedestal for it, he launches a public campaign to raise the money, promising to print the names of all the donors. However, he later discovers that con men are collecting money in The Globe's name. The government steps in and orders him to return all the funds.

Mitchell finds out that the fraud was concocted by The Star and writes a scathing article, but finds his press room has been vandalized, with all the type spilled from the cases and glue poured over it. But Mergenthaler declares his machine complete and soon the paper is ready to print. However, at this point a bomb is thrown into the office, destroying the printing press. Devastated by the loss of everything he has built, Mitchell drinks himself to sleep.

The next morning, he is puzzled to find his story being read by everyone. Mergenthaler had used his machine to typeset the paper again, and Hackett herself had provided the press and paper to print it while Mitchell's men worked late into the night. Hackett tells him that she has decided to kill The Star so that The Globe can flourish.

Instead of "The End," the film ends with "THIRTY", the newspaper reporter's signal of the end of a story.

== Cast ==
- Gene Evans as Phineas Mitchell
- Mary Welch as Charity Hackett
- Bela Kovacs as Ottmar Mergenthaler real-life inventor of the Linotype machine
- Herbert Heyes as Josiah Davenport (seasoned journalist)
- Tina Pine as Jenny O'Rourke
- George O'Hanlon as Steve Brodie real-life daredevil who claimed to have jumped off Brooklyn Bridge on July 23, 1886 (in the film the event appears The Globe on June 14, 1886)
- J. M. Kerrigan as Dan O'Rourke
- Forrest Taylor as Charles A. Leach (Mitchell's publisher/investing partner)
- Don Orlando as Mr. Angelo (illiterate type-setter)
- Neyle Morrow as Thomas Guest
- Dick Elliott as Jeff Hudson
- Stuart Randall as Mr. Spiro
- Dee Pollock as Rusty
- Hal K. Dawson as Mr. Wiley

== Production ==
Fuller decided to fund the film entirely on his own upon hearing suggestions by 20th Century Fox (the studio that he had made films for in the 1950s) to make it with stars, color or as a musical (Darryl F. Zanuck told him that his period piece would be a loser). He made the film for $200,000, with roughly half the budget being spent on a four-story set that attempted to re-create Park Row in the 19th century.

== Reception ==
Despite Fuller's attempts at garnering good press, the film was a financial failure that nearly bankrupted the director. In 1998, Jonathan Rosenbaum of the Chicago Reader included the film in his unranked list of the best American films not included on the AFI Top 100.
