= Dead on Arrival (disambiguation) =

Dead on arrival is a term used when a patient is found clinically dead.

Dead on Arrival may refer to:

- "Dead on Arrival", a song by Grim Reaper from See You in Hell
- "Dead on Arrival", a song by Fall Out Boy from Take This to Your Grave
- "Dead on Arrival", an episode of CSI: Miami season 7
- "Dead on Arrival", an episode of NCIS: Hawaiʻi season 3

== See also ==
- Dead on Arrivals, an EP by 16volt
- "Dead on a Rival", an episode of Modern Family season 11
- "Dread on Arrival", an episode of Ninjago: Sons of Garmadon
