= Quincy, M.E. season 5 =

Quincy, M.E.
- Season 5
- No. of episodes: 22

Release
- Original network: NBC
- Original release: September 20, 1979 – April 30, 1980

Season chronology
- ← Previous; Season 4 Next → Season 6

This is a list of episodes for the fifth season (1979–80) of the NBC television series Quincy, M.E..

In this season, Donald Bellisario and R. A. Cinader take over as executive producers, and the opening theme is slightly rearranged.

== Episodes ==
No. overall	No. in season	Title	Directed by	Written by	Original release date	Prod. code
61	1	"No Way to Treat a Flower"	Ray Danton	Jeff Freilich & Christopher Trumbo	September 20, 1979	53101
When a young girl and her boyfriend die after smoking marijuana mixed with Colchicine, Quincy works to get the deadly poison off the market while the police and Sam try to stop others from smoking the deadly combination.
62	2	"Dead Last"	Ray Danton	W.T. Zacha & E. Nick Alexander	September 27, 1979	53104
Quincy overhears two jockeys arguing at a racetrack and later they both end up dead, each at the supposed hooves of horses... were they killed by horses gone wild or by humans?
63	3	"By the Death of a Child"	Alan Cooke	Robert Crais	October 4, 1979	53120
Quincy and Sam are sent to a Latin American country to determine the cause of the deaths of numerous babies, which may require use of an experimental drug to save them, all while trying to walk a diplomatic tightrope. Ina Balin and David Opatoshu guest star.
64	4	"Never a Child"	Ray Danton	Sam Egan	October 11, 1979	53103
Quincy's investigation of an alleged suicide by jumping leads the coroner into the murky world of child pornography, where he tries to save another girl from the clutches of a porn producer.
65	5	"Hot Ice"	Ray Danton	S : Ralph Wallace Davenport; T : Robert Crais	October 18, 1979	53109
The discovery of $2,000,000 worth of diamonds inside a dead body sends Quincy to Las Vegas for two reasons: To judge a "Miss Coroner" beauty pageant and going undercover to make contact with a group of diamond smugglers. Elaine Giftos, John Karlen, Elsa Raven, and David Sheiner guest star.
66	6	"Sweet Land of Liberty"	Robert Loggia	Erich Collier	October 25, 1979	53121
Sam's friend, a former Army soldier, suddenly turns violent, kills a policeman, then takes his own life in jail, and it's up to Quincy to help his assistant determine the reason for his friend's sudden change and to clear his name.
67	7	"Mode of Death"	Rod Holcomb	S : Deborah Klugman; T : Steve Greenberg & Aubrey Solomon	November 1, 1979	53124
While researching the alleged suicide of an evangelist whose church is under investigation, Quincy uses his forensic skills in addition to a psychological autopsy to establish if the cause of death was suicide, accidental death, or murder.
68	8	"Nowhere to Run"	Jeffrey Hayden	Linda Elstad & Sam Egan	November 8, 1979	53128
Quincy investigates what appears to be an open-and-shut case of a teenage boyfriend pushing his pregnant girlfriend off a cliff to her death, but his investigation points toward a dark secret in the girl's highly respected family.
69	9	"The Money Plague"	Rod Holcomb	S : Allan Cole & Chris Bunch; T : Sam Egan	November 15, 1979	53131
In a story drawn from the 1971 D. B. Cooper hijacking, a park ranger finds a skyjacker's skeleton in a forest, but he also finds (and dies from) anthrax spores, and it's up to Quincy and Sam to locate the hijacker's accomplice and the contaminated ransom money before it causes an international anthrax epidemic.
70	10	"For the Benefit of My Patients"	Jeremiah Morris	S : Phillip Edelman; S/T : Erich Collier	November 22, 1979	53130
Quincy takes on a private hospital's uncompromising policy of "pay before stay" when two lower-income patients die when being transferred to a public facility for failing to pay upfront.
71	11	"Murder by S.O.P."	Paul Krasny	Robert Crais	November 29, 1979	53133
Quincy's investigation into a deadly fire in a small-town jail which killed four prisoners turns into homicide when one of the victims was stabbed and the town's doctor is killed in a car "accident" after getting too close to identifying the killer.
72	12	"Honor Thy Elders"	Ray Danton	Sam Egan	January 10, 1980	53135
In an episode that delves into the subject of elder abuse, Quincy finds the suicide of an elderly man and the falling death of an elderly woman both resulted from the cruel abuse of their family members, and after visiting a senior center, he learns the abuse is far more widespread than he originally thought. Julie Adams, Susan French, and Estelle Winwood guest star.
73	13	"Diplomatic Immunity"	Ray Danton	Steve Greenberg & Gregory Crossman	January 17, 1980	53141
Quincy must determine the cause of death for several members of a Latin American dictator's staff before the dictator undergoes a life-saving operation amid protests and assassination threats.
74	14	"Riot"	Rod Holcomb	Allan Cole & Chris Bunch	January 31, 1980	53149
The death of a prison inmate, allegedly at the hands of an overzealous guard, results in a prison riot, and Quincy must race to find the answers before Sam becomes the next victim.
75	15	"Cover-up"	Paul Stanley	Michael Halperin	February 7, 1980	53143
The death of a heart attack victim caused by an inexperienced emergency room physician results in a nurse (and friend of Quincy) bringing charges of a cover-up by the clinic's staff.
76	16	"Unhappy Hour"	Ray Danton	Sam Egan	February 14, 1980	53137
The tragedy of teenage alcohol abuse and DUI is explored as Dr. Astin's niece is involved in an auto accident that takes the life of her boyfriend. Quincy has to determine if she was the driver and guilty of manslaughter. Lonny Chapman and Madlyn Rhue guest star.
77	17	"The Winning Edge"	Georg Fenady	William Cairncross & Lester William Berke	February 21, 1980	53152
A young gymnast dies suddenly during practice. After an autopsy finds amphetamines in her body, Quincy has to break through a wall of lies from her coach and teammates to uncover the truth.
78	18	"New Blood"	John Peyser	Jeri Taylor	February 28, 1980	53153
While Quincy is on a "forced vacation", a young fill-in, Dr. McCracken (Beverly Adams) is tasked with a politically-sensitive autopsy on a dead city councilman, and when Quincy returns, she resents his involvement before joining forces to find the killer. Jane Wyatt guest stars; Dennis Haysbert appears in a small role as a lab assistant.
79	19	"T.K.O."	Lawrence Doheny	S : Deborah Klugman; S/T : Sam Egan	March 13, 1980	53151
Quincy determines the deaths of a newly-crowned boxing champion and Danny's chef, Alfredo, are connected to an incompetent surgeon whose facilities lack reliable life-saving equipment and are too remote to an emergency facility. Quincy finds the laws are non-existent in regulating such facilities.
80	20	"The Final Gift"	Georg Fenady	T : R. A. Cinader; S/T : Marjorie Worcester	March 20, 1980	53158
Two of Quincy's old Korean War Buddies, Max and Charlie, are involved in a small plane crash. When Max dies after a blood transfusion from Charlie, Quincy discovers arsenic in Max's blood, and needs to determine if Charlie or someone else may be responsible.
81	21	"Deadly Arena"	Jeffrey Hayden	S : R. A. Cinader; S/T : Sam Egan	March 27, 1980	53156
Quincy teams up with Health Department investigator Dr. Janet Carlyle (Diana Muldaur) to try to stop a World Cup Soccer title game due to an outbreak of botulism that has killed three people and may sicken more than 90,000 soccer fans at the Los Angeles Memorial Coliseum.
82	22	"No Way to Treat a Patient"	Georg Fenady	R. A. Cinader	April 30, 1980	53157
A gunshot victim from a professional hit arrives at an emergency clinic, then dies during transport to a hospital from a second (undetected) gunshot wound. Quincy must decide if a young doctor missed the second wound or if it was the finish of a hit job. Ana Alicia and A Martinez guest star.
