= List of Tokyo Revengers episodes =

Key visual for the series

Tokyo Revengers is an anime television series based on the manga series Tokyo Revengers by Ken Wakui. Produced by Liden Films, it is directed by Koichi Hatsumi for the first three seasons and Maki Kodaira from the fourth onwards. Yasuyuki Mutō, Keiko Ōta, Satoki Iida and Hiroaki Tsutsumi are respectively in charge of series composition, character designs, sound direction and music composition. The 24-episode first season aired from April 11 to September 19, 2021. The series aired on Mainichi Broadcasting System and is licensed by Muse Communication in Southeast Asia and South Asia, with streaming on the Muse Asia YouTube channel and Bilibili. A series of anime shorts featuring chibi versions of the characters, titled ChibiReve (ちびりべ; "Chibi Revengers"), were produced by Studio Puyukai, which began airing on April 12, 2021. Crunchyroll streams the series outside of Asia, including a Russian voice-over and Spanish, Portuguese, French, German, and English dubs. The English dub premiered on its platform on May 29, 2021. In January 2026, it was announced that the English dub would make its broadcast television premiere in the United States on Adult Swim's Toonami programming block beginning on February 8, 2026.

Three pieces of theme music are used for the first season of the series. Official Hige Dandism performed the opening theme song, "Cry Baby", which plays on all 24 episodes of the season, while Eill performed the first ending theme song, "Koko de Iki o Shite" (ここで息をして; lit. 'Take a Breath Here'), which plays for the first 12 episodes. The second ending theme song, which plays on all remaining episodes of the season, is "Tokyo Wonder", performed by Nakimushi.

A second season, subtitled Christmas Showdown Arc, aired from January 8 to April 2, 2023. Official Hige Dandism performed the opening theme song, "White Noise" (ホワイトノイズ), while Tuyu performed the ending theme song, "Kizutsukedo, Aishiteru" (傷つけど、愛してる。; lit. 'It might be painful, but I still love it'). A third season, subtitled Tenjiku Arc, aired from October 4 to December 27, 2023. The opening theme song from the previous season is retained and used alongside updated visuals, while Hey-Smith performed the ending theme song, "Say My Name".

In June 2024, it was announced that the series would receive a fourth season. A mini series, titled Dōwa Revengers (童話リベンジャーズ; lit. 'Fairy Tale Revengers'), was also announced, consisting of a Tokyo Revengers version of various fairy tales, with the first episode being based on Momotarō. The fourth season, subtitled War of the Three Titans Arc, will be directed by Maki Kodaira, replacing Hatsumi from the previous seasons, who is now handling series composition with Mutō. It premiered on October 3, 2026.

== Series overview ==
Season	Episodes	Originally released	
Season	Episodes	First released	Last released
1	24	April 11, 2021	September 19, 2021
2	13	January 8, 2023	April 2, 2023
3	13	October 4, 2023	December 27, 2023
4	13	October 3, 2026	TBA

== Episodes ==
Note: Unless otherwise noted, all multi-word episode titles from the series are stylized in sentence case.

=== Season 1 (2021) ===
No. overall	No. in season	Title	Directed by	Written by	Storyboarded by	Original release date (Note: MBS listed the series premiere on April 10 at 26:08, which is effectively April 11 at 2:08 a.m. JST.)	English air date
1	1	"Reborn"	Makoto Tamagawa	Yasuyuki Mutō	Shinobu Tagashira	April 11, 2021	February 8, 2026
On July 1, 2017, Takemichi Hanagaki learns via the news that internal conflict within the Tokyo Manji gang caused civilian deaths, including his middle school girlfriend, Hinata Tachibana, and her younger brother, Naoto Tachibana. Three days later, Takemichi gets pushed onto active train tracks. As a train approaches him, Takemichi remembers Hinata and awakens twelve years back in the past on July 4, 2005. Reunited with his middle school friends, Takemichi recalls their fight with third-year middle school students in Shibuya, which led to them getting beaten up by upperclassmen led by Masataka "Kiyomasa" Kiyomizu and forced into the Tokyo Manji as lackeys. Remembering this was the start of his downfall, Takemichi seeks out Hinata, overwhelmed by emotion upon seeing her again. Later, Takemichi saves a bullied boy who reveals himself as Naoto. Remembering the present, Takemichi warns Naoto that in 2017, both he and Hinata will die. He tells Naoto to protect his sister and shakes his hand. Takemichi awakens back in the present. Naoto, now alive and a police officer, reveals to Takemichi that he traveled through time. Though Naoto survived thanks to his warning, Hinata still died. Determined to change fate, Naoto asks Takemichi to save her.
2	2	"Resist"	Saori Tachibana	Yasuyuki Mutō	Saori Tachibana	April 18, 2021	February 15, 2026
Takemichi agrees to help Naoto save Hinata. Naoto explains that Takemichi's ability allows him to leap exactly twelve years to the day into the past, triggered by a handshake between them. For two sleepless days, Naoto briefs him on the Tokyo Manji gang's history, including classified details obtained by his murdered investigator predecessor, whose death was recorded during an undercover operation. Naoto believes the gang's current circumstances began when its top leaders, Manjiro "Mikey" Sano and Tetta Kisaki, met back in August 2005. If Takemichi can prevent their meeting, Hinata may not die. After shaking hands, Takemichi goes to July 6, 2005, during his active match inside Kiyomasa's illegal ring. Knocked out instantly, he is beaten up further as punishment for losing. Remembering he was once Kiyomasa's errand boy, Takemichi realizes this humiliation drove him to flee Shibuya, abandoning his friends and Hinata. When Takemichi recklessly mentions Mikey's name, Kiyomasa nearly kills him. Feeling defeated, Takemichi visits Hinata, who worries about his injuries. Seeing her again renews his determination to save her. The next day, learning Takuya is up next to fight, Takemichi steps in before it starts and boldly challenges Kiyomasa himself, declaring he wants a "king versus slave" matchup.
3	3	"Resolve"	Katsuya Asano	Yasuyuki Mutō	Katsuya Asano	April 25, 2021	February 22, 2026
Determined to stop being his lackey, Takemichi challenges Kiyomasa. Though hopelessly outmatched, he refuses to yield, declaring Kiyomasa will have to kill him to win. As Kiyomasa prepares to bring out his bat, the Tokyo Manji gang's leaders arrive: vice-commander Ken "Draken" Ryuguji and commander Manjiro "Mikey" Sano. Mikey casually beats Kiyomasa down for disgracing the gang's reputation with his fighting ring and unexpectedly declares Takemichi his friend, impressed by his resolve. Though Takemichi's friends celebrate his newfound connection with Mikey, he worries he has merely traded one king for another. The next day, Mikey barges into Takemichi's classroom, dragging him out after beating up several upperclassmen with Draken. When Hinata mistakes the situation for bullying, she boldly slaps Mikey. Takemichi stands firm, demanding that he and Draken not harm her. Amused, Mikey respects Takemichi even more for protecting his girlfriend while being outmatched. Later, while riding bikes together, Mikey explains to Takemichi that he reminds him of his deceased older brother, someone reckless yet unwavering. Mikey dreams of creating a new era for honorable delinquents. Takemichi questions whether Mikey could truly become the ruthless leader Naoto described. As Takemichi walks home, he vaguely notices someone who could be Tetta Kisaki.
4	4	"Return"	Takahiro Ono	Yoriko Tomita	Yūichi Abe	May 2, 2021	March 1, 2026
After going out shopping together, Hinata invites Takemichi over to her home for studying. She thanks him for saving Naoto from bullies a week ago, who now dreams of becoming a police officer like their father. While watching fireworks together on the rooftop, Takemichi attempts to hold Hinata's hand but inadvertently grabs Naoto's, triggering his return to the present. Naoto verifies the rules of Takemichi's time leaps—whatever time he spends in the past passes equally in the present and vice versa. Additionally, his body remains dormant in the present during past trips. Learning Takemichi met Manjiro Sano, they decide to investigate why Toman became sinister. Shockingly, records show Atsushi Sendo has risen within Toman's ranks despite previously being a petty criminal in the original timeline. They contact Atsushi and meet at his hostess club. On the rooftop with Takemichi, Atsushi reveals the truth—he was the one who pushed him onto the tracks, acting under Kisaki's orders. Since Draken's death, Mikey disappeared, and Kisaki took control of Toman. Begging Takemichi to save everyone by changing the past, Atsushi commits suicide while Kisaki hides nearby. Grief-stricken but resolute, Takemichi vows to save everyone and stop Kisaki from corrupting Toman.
5	5	"Releap"	Takanori Yano	Yasuyuki Mutō	Takashi Kawabata	May 9, 2021	March 8, 2026
Takemichi discovers he has been fired after disappearing for two weeks during his time leap. Later, Naoto reveals to Takemichi the next crucial event: on August 3, 2005, Draken dies after being stabbed during a massive gang brawl involving the Tokyo Manji gang. Believing Draken's survival will prevent Mikey from changing and corrupting Toman, Takemichi leaps back into the past. Takemichi awakens in a karaoke room with Emma Sano, startling him as he runs away and coincidentally encounters Hinata outside. During their conversation, Draken summons Takemichi to a Toman meeting at Musashi Shrine. There, Takemichi meets several gang captains and learns that the group is preparing to fight another gang called Moebius. The conflict began after Moebius' leader, Nobutaka Osanai, brutally assaulted a friend and his girlfriend of Toman member Haruki "Pah-chin" Hayashida. Mikey declares they will confront Moebius during the Musashi Festival, the same day Draken is fated to die. Later, Takemichi secretly follows Mikey and Draken to a hospital where the victim's girlfriend lies unconscious from her assault. Watching them handle her grieving parents with humility, Takemichi realizes how deeply Draken influences Mikey. Now understanding their bond, Takemichi becomes more determined to protect Draken and change their futures.
6	6	"Regret"	Rion Kujō	Yoriko Tomita	Shinobu Tagashira	May 16, 2021	March 15, 2026
A flashback reveals Ken's harsh childhood in a red-light district, abandoned by his prostitute mother and forced to grow strong alone. Nicknamed "Draken", he gained notoriety in elementary school through constant fighting. One day, a gang orders Draken to bring Mikey to them. Draken expects a formidable-looking opponent, but instead meets a small, carefree kid. Despite his appearance, Mikey effortlessly defeats the local gang's leader, Sameyama, and asks Draken to be his friend, forming the foundation of the Tokyo Manji gang and the pair's unbreakable bond. Back in the present, Takemichi meets up with Naoto to track down the former Moebius leader, Nobutaka Osanai. During their interrogation of him in a restaurant, Osanai denies killing Draken, revealing that the conflict was manipulated by someone else in order to fracture Toman. Takemichi returns to the past and desperately attempts to stop the upcoming brawl between the two gangs, warning Mikey that it is a trap. However, Pah-chin violently shuts him down. Draken briefly considers caution, but Mikey stands firm on fighting Moebius. Suddenly, Osanai arrives with the Moebius gang, surrounding Toman's top brass. With tensions emerging, the confrontation begins, confirming Takemichi's fears that everything is unfolding exactly as the trap intended.
7	7	"Revive"	Yū Harima	Yasuyuki Mutō	Rei Nakahara	May 23, 2021	March 22, 2026
Takemichi is shocked to see how different Osanai is from his present counterpart. Osanai strikes Takemichi for looking down on him before Pah-chin steps in to face the gang leader. Mikey orders everyone to stand back, insisting it is Pah-chin's fight. Despite his determination, Pah-chin is effortlessly overpowered. Before he collapses, Mikey catches Pah-chin, assuring him he has not lost. As Moebius mocks them, Mikey steps forward and knocks Osanai out with a single kick. Draken stops Osanai when he gets up and attempts to retaliate with a broken beer bottle, condemning his actions and declaring Moebius defeated and absorbed into Toman. As the police approach, both gangs scatter. Takemichi believes the conflict ended peacefully, but suddenly Pah-chin stabs Osanai and waits for the cops to arrive. While fleeing, Takemichi passes out and awakens in a hospital, where Emma informs him Mikey and Draken have begun fighting, splitting Toman into factions. Three days later, Draken visits Takemichi at his house, confirming Pah-chin's arrest and Osanai's survival before angrily declaring that Toman is finished. Mikey and Draken confront each other outside, with their argument escalating into a destructive tossing match that destroys Takemichi's belongings until he snaps and demands they stop.
8	8	"Rechange"	Makoto Tamagawa	Yasuyuki Mutō	Shinobu Tagashira	May 30, 2021	March 29, 2026
Takemichi pleads with Mikey and Draken not to tear Toman apart with their actions. However, they begin to laugh at Takemichi after it is discovered he has dog poop in his hair from falling into trash. After cleaning himself up, Takemichi reunites with the pair and learns they have made up. Takemichi deduces it was over Pah-chin, with Mikey wanting to help him evade jail and Draken respecting his decision for wanting to be punished for his actions. Relieved, Takemichi now believes he has changed the future and saved Draken from dying. Hinata and Emma arrive so that Hinata may ask Takemichi to go to the festival with her. On the evening of August 3 at the festival, Hinata teases Takemichi about needing to earn her forgiveness. After it begins raining, the pair share a moment under a nearby tree as Hinata forgives Takemichi, which gets interrupted by a warning call that Draken is in danger. Takemichi rushes off to discover Kiyomasa plotting to murder Draken. Takemichi is beaten and tied up, but Hinata finds and encourages him with a heartfelt kiss. Feeling renewed, Takemichi meets up with Mitsuya, who confirms internal tensions remain. Meanwhile, Peh-yan closes in on Draken.
9	9	"Revolt"	Aimi Yamauchi	Yoriko Tomita	Aimi Yamauchi	June 6, 2021	April 5, 2026
While searching for Draken, Mitsuya explains that Peh-yan believes Toman betrayed Pah-chin and has joined forces with Moebius members to target Draken. As Draken prepares to confront Peh-yan, he is suddenly struck from behind with a bat. Remembering Naoto's newspaper regarding the parking lot incident, Takemichi rushes there and discovers Draken overwhelmed by enemies. Exhausted, Draken entrusts the situation to Mitsuya as Mikey arrives, who deduces he was lured away from the festival to create this opportunity. A high schooler named Hanma reveals himself as Moebius' acting leader and declares their original intention was to dismantle Toman through internal conflict. Hanma summons a large force of around a hundred Moebius members, but Toman members soon arrive to match this, turning it into a full-scale brawl. Amid the chaos, Takemichi desperately searches for Draken to protect him. Meanwhile, Mikey confronts Peh-yan, who lashes out at him for abandoning Pah-chin. Mikey allows Peh-yan to vent his frustrations, insisting he still cares deeply for Pah-chin and does not want to fight his friend. Elsewhere, Takemichi discovers Kiyomasa holding a bloody knife and rambling to himself about getting Draken. Turning in horror, Takemichi discovers Draken collapsed on the ground in a pool of blood.
10	10	"Rerise"	Yū Harima	Yasuyuki Mutō	Saori Tachibana	June 13, 2021	April 12, 2026
Takemichi quickly alerts Mikey that Draken has been stabbed, but Hanma blocks Mikey's path towards them. Unable to reach Draken, Mikey entrusts Takemichi with saving his life. Realizing Draken is still breathing, Takemichi carries him towards safety as Hinata and Emma confirm an ambulance is on its way. Before help arrives, Kiyomasa and his gang confront Takemichi in a nearby alley. Though Draken urges him to flee with the others, Takemichi refuses, determined not to run away again after a lifetime of regret. Facing down Kiyomasa, Takemichi declares that their last fight went unfinished. Despite being stabbed and beaten up by Kiyomasa, Takemichi continues resisting, fueled by memories of his own weakness. Takemichi tackles Kiyomasa, bites him, and ultimately chokes him unconscious, securing a hard-fought victory. However, Kiyomasa's gang moves in to retaliate. As Hinata and Emma escape, an injured Takemichi and Draken prepare for the worst. Suddenly, Atsushi and the gang arrive to defend them, inspired by Takemichi's resolve. Though they are easily outmatched and beaten up, the group refuses to stay down, continuing to fight despite being weak themselves. As this goes down, the sound of sirens begins filling the air. Takemichi smiles, confident that they just won.
11	11	"Respect"	Ryūhei Aoyagi	Seiko Takagi	Shinobu Tagashira	June 20, 2021	April 19, 2026
Kiyomasa's gang flees, leaving him behind. Hinata and Emma guide the medics towards Takemichi and Draken, who are rushed to the hospital. Meanwhile, Toman defeats Moebius, leaving only Mikey and Hanma straggling. Hanma retreats before the police can arrive, ominously announcing the rise of Valhalla. Inside the ambulance, Draken thanks Takemichi but suddenly goes into cardiac arrest, forcing the medics to perform CPR. At the hospital, everyone waits anxiously until the surgery succeeds and Draken survives, sparking celebration among Toman. Peyan, burdened with guilt, learns from Mitsuya how deeply Draken cared for Pah-chin and resolves to apologize. Realizing it is now August 4th, Takemichi affirms he has changed the past and saved Draken. Later, Takemichi discovers Mikey quietly crying in relief. Days pass as Takemichi gains recognition for his bravery. Visiting Draken, Takemichi receives Toman's founding uniform from Mikey as thanks. On the rooftop, Mikey questions Takemichi's foresight but ultimately expresses his gratitude. Deciding his mission is complete, Takemichi returns to the present. Back in his future life, he finds better circumstances, including Atsushi pursuing hairstyling as he suggested. Naoto contacts him, confirming the timeline has changed and Hinata is alive. Takemichi feels optimistic as he prepares to meet her.
12	12	"Revenge"	Ken'ichi Kuhara	Seiko Takagi	Ken'ichi Kuhara	June 27, 2021	April 26, 2026
Riding with Naoto, Takemichi reflects on the despair he felt after learning of Hinata's death. He looks forward to seeing her again as Naoto explains that the Toman dispute never happened now. At Hinata's apartment, Takemichi convinces himself that Hinata has moved on and that he is still a failure. As he leaves, he unexpectedly encounters her—now as an adult—and breaks down upon seeing her alive. With the reunion being awkward, Naoto suggests they go out for a drive to ease tension. During this, Takemichi notices a familiar necklace Hinata is wearing and wonders if she still has feelings for him. When Naoto is called in for police duty, Hinata takes Takemichi to a park and recalls being dumped there. Takemichi realizes she is speaking about him, leaving him determined to change. At a public restroom, Takemichi encounters Hanma and senses danger. Rushing back, he witnesses Akkun crash into Hinata's car under Kisaki's orders. As the vehicle ignites, Akkun pleads for Takemichi to save everyone before it explodes. Takemichi reaches Hinata, but she is critically injured. Confessing his love to her, Takemichi is pushed away by Hinata before the car explodes. Devastated, Takemichi vows to save her again.
13	13	"Odds and Ends" (Note: Originally rendered in title case)	Fumihiro Ueno	Yoriko Tomita	Shinobu Tagashira	July 4, 2021	May 3, 2026
At Hinata's funeral, Takemichi reminisces on their present reunion and her final moments. Hinata's mother bestows Takemichi with the four-leaf clover necklace he gave Hinata, proving how much she treasured him. Naoto reveals that Akkun had a family in this timeline, deducing Kisaki likely manipulated him by threatening to harm them. Realizing Draken's survival alone was not what decided Toman's future, Takemichi concludes that the gang itself must be dismantled from within. Determined, he vows to rise through Toman's ranks to directly stop Kisaki. Some time later, Takemichi and Naoto visit Draken on death row. Though imprisoned for murder, Draken remains spiritually unchanged and reflects fondly on Toman's early days. He admits that, given another chance, he would kill Kisaki—the true source of Toman's corruption. Draken warns Takemichi that Kisaki targets anyone who is close to Mikey. Takemichi learns from Naoto that Kisaki is now Toman's acting leader, affirming he is the key to Hinata's demise. Returning to the past, Takemichi sets his sights on becoming captain of Toman's third division to climb up ranks. Takemichi reunites with Mikey and Draken in a sentō. As the trio leaves, Mikey reveals they are going to welcome the new third division captain.
14	14	"Break Up"	Daiki Handa	Yoriko Tomita	Daiki Handa	July 11, 2021	May 10, 2026
At a Toman gathering, Draken announces the selection of a new third division captain. Takemichi briefly believes it might be him, but is stunned when Kisaki is introduced. Recognized by some as a former Moebius member, Kisaki's appointment sparks outrage, but Mikey insists Toman needs his strength to battle Valhalla. Horrified of Kisaki's future role in Toman's corruption and Hinata's death, Takemichi impulsively punches him, disrupting the ceremony and angering everyone. Before things escalate, former first division captain Keisuke Baji unexpectedly appears and beats up Takemichi. He resigns from Toman and leaves for Valhalla, shocking the gang. Takemichi is approached by Mikey, who explains that Baji was one of Toman's founding members and a close childhood friend. Despite Kisaki's value, Mikey admits he distrusts him and offers Takemichi a deal—bring Baji back before the battle with Valhalla, and he will remove Kisaki from Toman. Takemichi accepts and is officially inducted into Toman's second division under Mitsuya. While cleaning up his injuries, Takemichi reflects on how much more he has become involved. Discovering a charm with a photo of Toman's founders inside, Takemichi notices a mysterious sixth member he does not recognize. Elsewhere, Baji reunites with that member—Kazutora Hanemiya.
15	15	"No Pain, No Gain" (Note: Stylized as "No Pain, no gain")	Kana Kawana	Seiko Takagi	Shinobu Tagashira	July 18, 2021	May 17, 2026
At school, Takemichi worries about how to bring back Baji before Mikey's deadline. His friends congratulate him on joining Toman, but he explains his dilemma to them. Yamagishi gives everyone a crash course on the gangs: Toman has grown to 150 members after absorbing Kisaki's Moebius faction, while the remaining anti-Toman members joined Hanma to form Valhalla, a 300-member gang also known as the "Headless Angel", led by a secret commander. Suddenly, Kazutora barges into Takemichi's classroom looking for him. Recognized as Valhalla's feared third-in-command, Kazutora cheerfully drags Takemichi to Valhalla's hideout. Takemichi is disturbed by Kazutora's violent behavior towards his juniors but continues following, hoping to find Baji. At an abandoned arcade, Takemichi witnesses Baji brutally beating up his former Toman vice-captain as a test of faith to prove his loyalty to Valhalla. Hanma questions Takemichi about what Baji said at Toman's meeting, and Takemichi confirms that Baji openly declared Toman to be his enemy. Satisfied, Valhalla officially accepts Baji. When Takemichi demands to know why Baji betrayed Toman, Baji explains that Kazutora was also one of Toman's founding members and they both harbor a deep grudge. Baji begins recounting Toman's early days—and an event that changed everything.
16	16	"Once Upon a Time"	Rion Kujō	Yasuyuki Mutō	Masayoshi Nishida	July 25, 2021	May 24, 2026
Mikey, Draken, Baji, Kazutora, Mitsuya, and Pah-chin were carefree friends forming Toman in the summer of 2003. During a motorcycle ride, Mikey's slow moped frustrates everyone and attracts the attention of an older gang. When the gang threatens to damage the moped, Mikey fiercely warns them off. Later, after Baji is left behind to refuel the moped, the same gang attacks him and attempts to destroy it. Mikey arrives, revealing that what he truly values is not the moped, but Baji. Together, they fight the gang. Later, on August 13, 2003, shortly before Mikey's birthday and wanting to make him happy, Kazutora convinces Baji to help steal Mikey's dream motorcycle—a CB250T. Baji reluctantly goes along with his plan. During the burglary, the shop owner catches them. Baji is horrified to discover that the owner is Shinichiro Sano, Mikey's older brother. Before Baji can stop him, Kazutora strikes Shinichiro in the head with a bolt cutter, killing him. As panic sets in, Kazutora suffers a mental breakdown, irrationally blaming Mikey for the tragedy because the bike was meant for him. Responding officers arrest both boys. When Mikey arrives, Baji cries and apologizes as a broken Kazutora mutters about murdering Mikey.
17	17	"No Way"	Ryūhei Aoyagi	Yoriko Tomita	Saori Tachibana	August 1, 2021	May 31, 2026
Concluding his flashback, Baji explains he owes his freedom to Kazutora, who took full responsibility to spare him from juvenile detention. Hanma welcomes Baji into Valhalla and declares that the battle against Toman will take place on October 31st. The next morning, Takemichi meets Chifuyu, Baji's battered vice-captain, who reveals that Baji's apparent betrayal is actually a mission to expose Kisaki. Chifuyu believes Kisaki is the true enemy and asks Takemichi to help investigate. Takemichi boldly tells Mikey that he intends to become the head of Toman someday, earning Chifuyu's support despite his doubts. The pair question Osanai, who reveals that Kisaki orchestrated the conflict with Moebius, used him as a pawn, and planned out Draken's murder to become Toman's second-in-command. Osanai informs them that Kisaki now uses Hanma as his new pawn and is far more dangerous than any ordinary delinquent. Chifuyu concludes that Kisaki is the secret leader of Valhalla. Takemichi returns to the present to revisit Draken with Naoto. Expecting confirmation that Kisaki led Valhalla, Takemichi is shocked when Draken reveals Valhalla became the foundation of the new Toman, and that Mikey became its leader. According to Draken, the "Bloody Halloween" changed everything when Mikey killed Kazutora.
18	18	"Open Fire"	Ken'ichi Kuhara	Seiko Takagi	Ken'ichi Kuhara	August 8, 2021	June 14, 2026
Draken reveals that Mikey killed Kazutora after the latter murdered Baji. Kisaki arranged for someone else to take the blame for Kazutora's death, allowing Mikey to avoid punishment. Consumed by guilt, Mikey fell into darkness, and Valhalla became the foundation for a new, corrupted Toman with Kisaki by his side. Realizing Baji's death pushed Mikey to kill Kazutora, Takemichi resolves to save Baji and prevent both tragedies. Returning to the past, he reunites with Hinata, who gives him a matching clover pendant, reminding him of what he is fighting for. Draken unsuccessfully attempts to reconcile with Kazutora, who rejects Toman and vows to destroy them. On the eve of the brawl, Chifuyu and Takemichi meet with Baji, who refuses to abandon Kazutora. Even after Takemichi advises him not to die, Baji declares his intent to kill Mikey. Later, Mikey admits he can not bring himself to hate Baji and asks Toman to help bring back his old friend. On October 31, 2005, delinquent leaders from across Tokyo gather to witness the showdown between Toman and Valhalla. After Kazutora rejects Draken's proposal to give Baji back if Toman wins and knocks out his appointed referee, both gangs charge towards each other.
19	19	"Turn Around"	Noriyuki Nomata	Yasuyuki Mutō	Masayoshi Nishida	August 15, 2021	June 21, 2026
The Bloody Halloween erupts into a massive clash between Toman and Valhalla. As Toman's captains dominate, Takemichi struggles and gets overwhelmed until Mitsuya rescues him and reminds him why they are fighting. Encouraged further by Chifuyu, who promises to watch his back, Takemichi overcomes his fears and earnestly joins the battle. Due to Valhalla's numerical advantage and older members, Draken protects Toman's weaker fighters. Seeing Takemichi recklessly challenge Valhalla motivates the exhausted Toman members to keep fighting, allowing Draken to go on the offensive, overwhelming Valhalla and sending Hanma flying with a powerful punch. Meanwhile, Mikey pursues Kazutora onto a pile of wrecked cars. Anticipating a one-on-one fight, Mikey instead faces Kazutora's powerful allies—Chonbo and Chome. Using the unstable terrain to limit Mikey's kicks, they restrain him as Kazutora repeatedly strikes Mikey with a metal pipe. Battered and bleeding, Mikey rises and asks Kazutora why he sees him as an enemy. Kazutora, twisted by years of abuse and guilt, insists that Mikey is responsible for his suffering and that killing your enemy makes you a hero. Enraged by Kazutora's warped logic and the killing of Shinichiro, Mikey breaks free of Kazutora's allies and delivers a kick that renders Kazutora unconscious.
20	20	"Dead or Alive"	Yū Harima	Yasuyuki Mutō	Masayoshi Nishida	August 22, 2021	June 28, 2026
After defeating Kazutora and his allies, Mikey collapses from exhaustion. Valhalla members rush to finish Mikey off. With no one else able to save him, Takemichi charges toward Mikey despite being repeatedly battered along the way. Before the assailants can strike, Kisaki charges and takes down the leading Valhalla division captain, earning praise from Toman as he appears to have saved Mikey. Takemichi realizes this is exactly what Kisaki wanted—whether Toman wins or loses, Kisaki still gains from it. Baji appears and attacks Kisaki with a metal pipe. Kisaki orders his division to kill Baji. Chifuyu blocks Baji's path, begging him not to ruin the mission. Refusing to fight his captain, Chifuyu reluctantly stands down as Takemichi attempts to restrain Baji. Before Baji can react, Kazutora appears from behind and stabs him in the back. Chifuyu tackles Kazutora as Baji insists that the wound is minor. Takemichi realizes that true danger may have been averted. Ignoring his injury, Baji tells Takemichi to protect Mikey and charges alone to fight Kisaki's entire third division, defeating all the opponents. Just as Baji reaches Kisaki and points his pipe at him, Kazutora's stab wound overwhelms him as he begins coughing up blood.
21	21	"One and Only"	Kana Kawana	Yasuyuki Mutō	Masayoshi Nishida	August 29, 2021	July 5, 2026
Baji collapses from his injury, shocking Takemichi and Chifuyu as they realize the wound is life-threatening. Kisaki observes that Kazutora only brought Baji to Valhalla to personally kill him. Mikey regains consciousness and, being angered over Baji's apparent death, he instantly knocks out Hanma before turning his fury towards Kazutora. As Mikey mercilessly beats Kazutora, Takemichi realizes history is repeating itself. Kazutora reflects on his guilt over killing Shinichiro and how Baji never abandoned him. Before Mikey can finish Kazutora off, Baji struggles to his feet and stops the assault. Refusing to let Mikey become a murderer, Baji stabs himself with Kazutora's knife, making his death a suicide. In his final moments, Baji reveals that Kisaki manipulated the conflict regarding Pah-chin to gain control of Toman and entrusts Takemichi with protecting Mikey and the gang. After a brief exchange with Chifuyu, Baji dies in his vice-captain's arms. Enraged, Mikey still attempts to kill Kazutora. Takemichi stands between them, enduring Mikey's punch while insisting Baji sacrificed himself to save everyone. As Takemichi removes his jacket, Baji's charm falls on the ground. Recognizing it as a symbol from Toman's founding, Mikey is overwhelmed by memories of the bond he shared with his friends.
22	22	"One for All"	Rion Kujō	Yoriko Tomita	Ryōko Nakano	September 5, 2021	July 12, 2026
On June 19, 2003, Mikey gathers his friends at a shrine. Mikey reveals Kazutora has been fighting the older and more dangerous Black Dragons gang alone, and Baji deduces they should form their own gang to protect each other. Baji assigns everyone their roles, and despite the others mocking the name, Mikey declares the gang to be called the Tokyo Manji. Wanting a symbol of their bond, they pool together money to buy a single charm, which Mikey bestows to Baji. Back in the Bloody Halloween, Mikey holds the same charm and remembers that Baji created Toman as a gang where they would risk their lives for one another. As police begin to arrive, Toman leaves as Kazutora stays behind to accept responsibility for Baji's death. Two weeks later, Chifuyu visits Baji's grave with yakisoba, remembering how they first met. He initially dismissed Baji as a nerd, but after Baji saved him from a gang ambush, Chifuyu became his loyal subordinate. Meanwhile, Takemichi and Draken visit Kazutora at juvenile detention. Although Kazutora intends to commit suicide, Draken urges him not to throw his life away and delivers Mikey's message: he forgives Kazutora and still considers him part of Toman.
23	23	"End of War"	Michiru Itabisashi & Rei Nakahara	Seiko Takagi	Yūji Ōya	September 12, 2021	July 19, 2026
After they visit with Kazutora, Draken informs Takemichi that Mikey wants him present at the next Toman meeting. Unsure of what Mikey intends for him, Takemichi ponders whether preventing him from killing Kazutora was enough to stop Kisaki's rise. Draken brings Takemichi to the brothel where he grew up. Draken explains that he was raised there as an orphan and shows Takemichi photos of the people he treasures inside his room. Draken admits he also wanted revenge on Kazutora, and thanks Takemichi for stopping Mikey when he did not. Outside, Takemichi panics after seeing Emma affectionately hugging Mikey, believing she is cheating on Draken. Joined by Hinata and Naoto, he follows them to uncover the truth. Takemichi reacts hysterically after witnessing Draken arriving, but instead he casually reveals that Mikey and Emma are actually half-siblings. Draken also gives Emma a birthday gift. Later, Mitsuya invites Takemichi to his school's sewing club, where he personally presents him with a custom Toman jacket as thanks for everything he has done. Proudly donning it, Takemichi attends the next day's Toman assembly. Draken officially welcomes him into the gang and warns that this meeting is important. Moments later, Mikey arrives alongside Hanma and Chifuyu.
24	24	"A Cry Baby" (Note: Stylized as "A Cry baby")	Kōji Aritomi	Yasuyuki Mutō	Ryōko Nakano	September 19, 2021	July 26, 2026
Mikey announces that Valhalla will merge into Toman under Hanma's directive. Although Toman members celebrate their expanded strength, Takemichi fears Kisaki's influence has just grown. Mikey honors Baji's sacrifice as Chifuyu reveals he has chosen to remain in Toman. Believing Baji entrusted Toman to Takemichi, Chifuyu appoints him as the new first division captain. Takemichi accepts and promptly returns to 2017. He awakens in a dramatically improved present as a wealthy Toman executive, reunited with his middle school friends and escorted into a meeting of the gang's upper echelon. There he meets several new individuals, including former Black Dragon members, as tensions rise over suspicions of a traitor among them. Kisaki arrives and invites Takemichi and Chifuyu to privately speak with him. Kisaki claims to regret orchestrating the Bloody Halloween before admitting this was a lie after successfully drugging their drinks, confessing that he manipulated Kazutora into killing Baji. Kisaki has them both tied up and accuses them of betraying Toman. Chifuyu confesses he has been working against Kisaki alone, insisting Takemichi is innocent. Kisaki shoots Takemichi in the leg before executing Chifuyu. As Takemichi breaks down in grief, Kisaki tearfully points the gun at him before pulling the trigger.

=== Season 2: Christmas Showdown Arc (2023) ===
No. overall	No. in season	Title	Directed by	Storyboarded by	Chief animation directed by	Original release date (Note: MBS listed the second season's premiere on January 7 at 26:08, which is effectively January 8 at 2:08 a.m. JST.)
25	1	"It Is What It Is"	Koji Aritomi	Koichi Hatsumi	Koichi Hatsumi & Atsutoshi Hashimoto	January 8, 2023
Kazutora helps Takemichi escape and tells him that the Tokyo Manji Gang has merged with the Black Dragons, a crime organization currently led by Hakkai Shiba. Although Kazutora and Chifuyu had attempted to defeat Kisaki themselves, Mikey also has lost trust in the founding Tokyo Manji Gang members and had murdered them. Once he brings Takemichi to Naoto, Naoto has him arrested. During interrogation, Naoto interrogates Takemichi on the current timeline and reveals that Chifuyu had secured video footage of Takemichi summoning Akkun to murder Hinata that also would have gotten Kisaki arrested, but he had refused to turn it in to protect Takemichi. Before Takemichi is transferred to prison, Naoto urges him to travel back in time.
26	2	"Gotta Go"	Ken'ichi Kuhara	Kazuhisa Ōno	Kenichi Ōnuki	January 15, 2023
Takemichi impresses Hakkai at a bowling alley, and the latter befriends him, inviting him over to his house. However, his house is surrounded by the Black Dragons, who are welcoming the return of their leader, Taiju Shiba. The Black Dragons attempt to attack Takemichi for invading their territory, while Taiju appears to fight him and pressure Hakkai into leaving the Tokyo Manji Gang for the Black Dragons. Hakkai and his sister, Yuzuha, reveal that Taiju is their older brother.
27	3	"Stand Alone"	Yoshinobu Kasai	Rei Nakahara	Airi Tsuyuki, Minoru Morita & Koichi Hatsumi	January 22, 2023
In exchange for Takemichi's safety, Hakkai promises to quit the Tokyo Manji Gang and join the Black Dragons. At a loss when Chifuyu consoles Takemichi, Takemichi reveals to him that he is a time traveler. Chifuyu then forms a plan to prevent Hakkai from quitting the Tokyo Manji Gang at the next captains' meeting, but it fails. However, Mikey leaves the decision to Mitsuya, who opposes Hakkai's decision.
28	4	"Family Bonds"	Rei Nakahara & Moe Katō	Moe Katō	Miki Urashima	January 29, 2023
Mitsuya hosts a meeting with Taiju and agrees to let Hakkai join the Black Dragons if he promises Yuzuha will no longer work for them, nor is he allowed to hit her. At night, Hakkai declares to Takemichi and Chifuyu that he will kill Taiju. Alarmed, Takemichi and Chifuyu attempt to rally the other Tokyo Manji Gang captains for help, but they all decline to intervene as breaking the agreement would reflect poorly on Mitsuya. However, Takemichi and Chifuyu succeed in getting help from Kisaki and Hanma, who use their connections to learn from Black Dragon member Koko that Taiju will be alone in a church on Christmas Eve. Meanwhile, Mikey is still grief-stricken over Baji's death.
29	5	"Christmas Eve"	Yū Yabuuchi	Kenji Setō	Airi Tsuyuki, Minoru Morita & Masahiro Emoto	February 5, 2023
Takemichi and Chifuyu reluctantly agree to work with Kisaki and Hanma, who want to keep their operation secret from the rest of the Tokyo Manji Gang. While preparing for Christmas Eve, Takemichi learns from Hinata that she and Kisaki used to go to the same cram school, and that they had met Takemichi in Grade 6 when he saved her from bullies. Later that day, Takemichi meets Hinata's father, who pressures him to break up with her due to his gang affiliations. As the day of the fight approaches, Takemichi breaks up with Hinata.
30	6	"Whip Up Morale"	Kenji Kuroda	Kenji Kuroda	Mazumasa Kihara, Airi Tsuyuki & Hiromi Ariga	February 12, 2023
Takemichi is sent inside the church to confront Hakkai and Taiju while Kisaki, Hanma, and Chifuyu stay behind as backup, but Kisaki and Hanma tie up Chifuyu and leave. Takemichi prevents Hakkai from stabbing Taiju, causing Taiju to retaliate and threaten to reveal Hakkai's secret. After being told by Kisaki, Yuzuha attempts to stab Taiju herself, but Takemichi narrowly causes her to miss. Takemichi then realizes that Yuzuha killed Taiju in the original timeline, and Kisaki used this as leverage to control Hakkai.
31	7	"Sibling Rivalry"	Kazuhisa Ōno	Kazuhisa Ōno	Kenichi Ōnuki	February 19, 2023
Enraged at Yuzuha, Taiju vows to kill her. Mitsuya is called in by Chifuyu and intervenes in the fight, but he is heavily wounded once Inui and Koko arrive to assist Taiju. Realizing they are at a disadvantage, Mitsuya forms a plan where Takemichi and Chifuyu will fight Koko and Inui while he and Hakkai will fight Taiju. However, Hakkai still fears Taiju and the Tokyo Manji Gang quickly gets taken down. Powered by his resolve, Takemichi persists against Taiju, declaring he will take over the Black Dragons.
32	8	"Strive Together"	Koji Aritomi	Koichi Hatsumi	Miki Urashima	February 26, 2023
Once Takemichi convinces Hakkai to trust him, Hakkai reveals that Yuzuha had been taking his beatings from Taiju and that she had protected him instead of the opposite. The Tokyo Manji Gang boosts his morale, encouraging him to help them defeat Taiju. However, Taiju, Koko, and Inui still overpower them, and the church is surrounded by 100 members of the Black Dragons. Suddenly, Mikey arrives at the church, raising concern among the Tokyo Manji Gang for breaking their truce with the Black Dragons.
33	9	"Dawning of a New Era"	Yoshifumi Sueda	Yoshifumi Sueda	Hisama Kinoshita	March 5, 2023
Recalling that Mikey had killed his friends in the current timeline, Takemichi worries about his emotionally weak state. Inui reveals he revived the Black Dragons and recruited Taiju as its leader for his strength, but Mikey quickly defeats him and states that his friends keep him strong, reassuring Takemichi that Mikey has changed. Taiju loses his resolve to fight after seeing that Draken has defeated all 100 Black Dragon members. The Tokyo Manji Gang celebrate their victory, while Hakkai and Yuzuha vow to never submit to Taiju again. Mikey then brings Takemichi to Hinata.
34	10	"The Light of My Life"	Shōji Ikeno	Takayuki Tanaka	Asuka Yamaguchi	March 12, 2023
Takemichi and Hinata make up, with Takemichi realizing that his break-up with Hinata had caused Mikey and Draken to come to the church. Mikey tells Takemichi about Shinichiro and discusses their resemblances. Mitsuya and Draken reminisce about their first meeting. The Tokyo Manji Gang go to the shrine to celebrate the New Year and prepare for their next meeting.
35	11	"On My Way Home"	Yoshinobu Kasai	Hideki Fukushima	Mazumasa Kihara & Airi Tsuyuki	March 19, 2023
At the next meeting, Mikey announces that Inui and Koko, who both hold the title of being co-leaders of the Black Dragons, have joined the Tokyo Manji Gang under Takemichi's division. In addition, following Chifuyu's report, Mikey removes Kisaki from the gang, with Hanma and all former members of Moebius and Valhalla leaving. Afterwards, Mikey gives Takemichi a motorbike constructed with an engine that Shinichiro had found in the Philippines. Once Takemichi returns to the present, he suddenly finds himself at Mitsuya's funeral.
36	12	"Last Order"	Takahiro Tanaka	Shūichirō Semura	Airi Tsuyuki	March 26, 2023
Takemichi learns from Naoto that Mikey is suspected of killing all the major members of the Tokyo Manji Gang, as well as Kisaki. He finds a letter from Mikey asking him to meet him in the Philippines. Once there, Mikey confirms that, after Takemichi had left the Tokyo Manji Gang, he became more violent and killed their friends. He gives Takemichi a gun and requests that he kill him. When Takemichi tries to talk him down, Mikey threatens to shoot him instead. Naoto fatally shoots Mikey, and Mikey dies in Takemichi's arms.
37	13	"When It Rains, It Pours"	Moe Katō & Rei Nakahara	Moe Katō	Miki Urashima	April 2, 2023
Once Takemichi returns to the past, he declares to Chifuyu that he will take over the Tokyo Manji Gang in order to stop Mikey from becoming violent. Meanwhile, Tenjiku – a gang from Yokohama – initiates an attack on the Tokyo Manji Gang, beginning with Takemichi and his division. During their escape, Takemichi is eventually cornered by Tenjiku and encounters Kisaki, who has joined the gang.

=== Season 3: Tenjiku Arc (2023) ===
No. overall	No. in season	Title	Directed by	Storyboarded by	Chief animation directed by	Original release date (Note: TV Tokyo listed the third season's premiere on October 3 at 24:00, which is effectively October 4 at midnight JST.)
38	1	"The Longest Day"	Yoshitaka Moshino	Masao Suzuki	Kenichi Ōnuki	October 4, 2023
Fourth division captain Smiley and his twin brother and vice captain, Angry, rescue Takemichi and his friends. They force several Tenjiku members to reveal their hideout, where they encounter Kakucho. Takemichi recognizes Kakucho as his childhood friend. While Kakucho makes his alliances clear, he also tells Takemichi there is a traitor within the Tokyo Manji Gang.
39	2	"Mortal Enemy"	Kayona Yamada	Hayato Sakoda	Airi Tsuyuki & Miki Urashima	October 11, 2023
After returning to the present, Takemichi meets Taiju while investigating. Taiju reveals to him and Naoto that Shinichiro founded the Black Dragons, and Naoto realizes that Kisaki had faked his death. The three are ambushed by several Tokyo Manji Gang members led by Inui and Koko. Taiju fights to allow Takemichi and Naoto to escape, but midway, Takemichi decides to turn back to talk to Inui and Koko. They are stopped by Kisaki, and Naoto is mortally wounded after taking a bullet meant for Takemichi. Izana orders Kakucho to shoot Takemichi as revenge for causing Mikey's death. Before Takemichi and Naoto die, they shake hands.
40	3	"Run Out of Patience"	Yoshinobu Kasai	Yukiko Imai	Asuka Yamaguchi	October 18, 2023
With Naoto dead in the future, Takemichi cannot return to the future, and he loses morale. He mistakes Hinata for Naoto and accidentally reveals that he is time-traveling to her, but she cheers him up. Regaining his resolve, Takemichi visits Mikey's house and learns that Izana is his half-brother. Mucho (Yasuyuki Muto) and Haruchiyo Sanzu, the captain and co-captain of the fourth division who are tasked with punishing traitors, arrive to capture Takemichi. The two take him to a warehouse, where Inui and Koko are also held captive.
41	4	"Come Back to Life"	Yoshifumi Sueda	Yoshifumi Sueda	Airi Tsuyuki	October 25, 2023
Mucho reveals that he was part of the S-62 generation, a group of violent juvenile delinquents consisting of Izana and several top executives of Tenjiku, and announces he will leave the Tokyo Manji Gang for Tenjiku. In doing so, he forces Koko to join him by torturing Takemichi and Inui, as Koko's financial knowledge is a valuable asset in making Tenjiku grow. After Inui brings Takemichi to safety, he shares with him about Shinichiro's life and influence as the leader of the Black Dragons. Inui pledges his loyalty to Takemichi and passes on the title of the leader of the Black Dragons to him.
42	5	"A Bad Hunch"	Koji Aritomi	Kenji Sato	Asuka Yamaguchi & Airi Tsuyuki	November 1, 2023
At the next Tokyo Manji Gang meeting, Takemichi learns that Tenjiku has been targeting the division captains, with Mitsuya and Smiley severely injured and hospitalized. Inui reveals that Tenjiku may be planning an attack on February 22, on the Black Dragons' 11th anniversary, and the Tokyo Manji Gang prepares to fight them on that day. The next morning, Mikey entrusts Takemichi to watch over Emma as he confronts Izana at Shinichiro's grave. Just as Takemichi realizes he's never seen Emma in the future, Kisaki mortally wounds her in a hit-and-run.
43	6	"Rise Against"	Kazuhisa Ōno	Kazuhisa Ōno	Kae Takakura	November 8, 2023
Mikey and Draken are distraught over Emma's death, and at the Tokyo Manji Gang's next meeting, the rest of the members decide to drop out of the fight with Tenjiku, as they are outnumbered by 350 people. However, Takemichi's determination convinces them to continue the fight, and they meet Tenjiku at the docks.
44	7	"Turn the Tide"	Rei Nakahara	Masao Suzuki	Kenji Matsuoka & Airi Tsuyuki	November 15, 2023
Peh-yan wins the opening match against Shion Madarame, giving the Tokyo Manji Gang a morale boost. However, the gang faces trouble when confronted with Tenjiku's top four and when Izana knocks out Peh-yan. Meanwhile, Inui reunites with Koko, but Koko insists on staying with Tenjiku for financial gain.
45	8	"I Know in My Head"	Yukiko Imai	Yukiko Imai	Airi Tsuyuki	November 22, 2023
In a flashback, Koko reveals that his obsession with money was because he was in love with Inui's older sister, Akane, who was gravely injured from a house fire and died as a result of her family not being able to afford her surgery. Mucho replaces Koko in his fight against Inui. Meanwhile, Hakkai and Angry struggle in their match against the Haitani brothers due to their lack of coordination.
46	9	"The Blue Ogre"	Yoshitaka Makino	Yoshitaka Makino	Kenichi Ōnuki	November 29, 2023
When the Haitani brothers are about to brutalize Hakkai, Angry begins crying and defeats them, as well as Mocchi and Mucho. However, Kakucho defeats him, Inui, and Chifuyu. With Takemichi left, he stands up to Kakucho but struggles in their match. Chifuyu attempts to convince Takemichi to withdraw, but he refuses. Kisaki later walks into the match and draws a gun against Takemichi.
47	10	"Brave Heart"	Koji Aritomi	Masao Suzuki	Airi Tsuyuki	December 6, 2023
Takemichi refuses to stand down against Kisaki and knocks him down with one punch, but Izana steps into the fight. Though Takemichi is no match against Izana, he holds him off long enough for Mikey and Draken to arrive. The two also surprisingly bring Hinata to the brawl, who admits that she told them that Takemichi was time traveling to bring back their resolve. Mikey declares his intent to fight Izana, and the two begin to battle.
48	11	"Nothing Is Left"	Yoshinobu Kasai	Kayona Yamada	Kenji Matsuoka, Takayuki Onoda & Airi Tsuyuki	December 13, 2023
Mikey and Izana fight, and although they are evenly matched, Izana begins to panic when Mikey states that he would have accepted him as family. Although Izana loses, he refuses to admit defeat and grabs Kisaki's gun, threatening to shoot Mikey. Kakucho attempts to calm him down, and in the midst of their struggle, Kisaki takes the gun and suddenly shoots him.
49	12	"Paradise Lost"	Kazuhisa Ōno	Kazuhisa Ōno	Kae Takakura, Kenichi Ōnuki & Takayuki Onoda	December 20, 2023
Kisaki attempts to shoot Kakucho again for interfering, but Izana sacrifices himself to protect him and is mortally wounded. As he dies, he confesses to Mikey that he is not related to the Sano family by blood and struggles to find family. When Takemichi confronts Kisaki, Hanma helps him escape on his motorbike, leading to a chase. While Draken fights Hanma, Takemichi continues to pursue Kisaki and corners him in the parking lot where Hinata died in the present.
50	13	"Meet His Fate"	Koji Aritomi	Yoshifumi Sueda	Airi Tsuyuki	December 27, 2023
Takemichi and Kisaki continue to brawl, while Kisaki explains to Takemichi that he plans to turn the Tokyo Manji Gang into a nationwide Yakuza gang to impress to Hinata. When Mikey and Hinata intervene, Kisaki flees with Takemichi in pursuit. Takemichi asks Kisaki if he is also a time traveler, and before Kisaki can answer, he is run over by a truck and dies. Afterwards, the police arrest the top officers in Tenjiku. Takemichi visits Kakucho, who had survived the gunshots, at the hospital, uneasy at Kisaki's death.

=== Season 4: War of the Three Titans Arc (2026) ===
No. overall	No. in season	Title	Directed by	Storyboarded by	Chief animation directed by	Original release date (Note: MBS and TBS listed the fourth season's premiere on October 2 at 25:23, which is effectively October 3 at 1:23 a.m. JST, while CBC retains Animeism's usual timeslot at 25:53 (effectively at 1:53 a.m. JST).)
51	1	"Break Up"	Maki Kodaira	Maki Kodaira	Airi Tsuyuki	October 3, 2026
52	2	"Be Left Behind the Times"	Kim Soo-Rim	Hideyo Yamamoto	Kenichi Ōnuki	October 10, 2026
53	3	"Crack a Smile"	Unknown	TBA	TBA	October 17, 2026
54	4	"Give Me a Hand"	TBA	TBA	TBA	October 24, 2026
55	5	"Turbulent Period"	TBA	TBA	TBA	October 30, 2026
56	6	"Shows Her Color"	TBA	TBA	TBA	November 6, 2026
