= Quincy, M.E. season 6 =

Quincy, M.E.
- Season 6
- No. of episodes: 18

Release
- Original network: NBC
- Original release: September 16, 1980 – May 6, 1981

Season chronology
- ← Previous; Season 5 Next → Season 7

This is a list of episodes for the sixth season (1980–81) of the NBC television series Quincy, M.E..

This season started later than usual due to a writers' strike, and the opening theme is again rearranged.

== Episodes ==
No. overall	No. in season	Title	Directed by	Written by	Original release date	Prod. code
83	1	"Last Rights"	Georg Fenady	Sam Egan	September 16, 1980	55301
A small-town coroner and friend of Quincy's (William Daniels) encounters two politically-charged problems; the death of a prominent citizen's son and the victim of a plant explosion, both of which may be tied into a textile plant with a history of safety violations. Note: This episode was filmed during season five but was aired here due to the writers' strike that delayed the start of Season 6.
84	2	"A Matter of Principle"	Ron Satlof	Steve Greenberg & Aubrey Solomon	November 12, 1980	55312
A rape suspect is cleared by a new technique developed by Sam to measure tooth impressions ... but did his technique accidentally free a guilty man?
85	3	"Last Day, First Day"	Leslie H. Martinson	Preston Wood	November 19, 1980	55304
The son of a veteran pathologist (Harry Townes) is bribed by the mob to force his father to cover up the real cause of death of a lawyer (and a coke dealer), and it's up to Quincy and a young medical student (Sarah Rush) to determine the truth.
86	4	"The Night Killer"	Jeffrey Hayden	Jeri Taylor	November 26, 1980	55317
A new pathologist, Dr. Gage (Jonathan Segal) mistakes a SIDS death of a twin baby for child abuse, which devastates him as well as the deceased baby's parents, and now the parents fear for the life of the surviving twin, who tested at risk for SIDS. Tyne Daly guest stars as the babies' mother.
87	5	"The Hope of Elkwood"	Richard Benedict	S : James Rosin; T : Michael Braverman	December 3, 1980	55316
The death of a young track star is blamed on his coach and his rigorous and exhausting training regimen, but Quincy and a young attorney attempt to determine the young man's death was due to natural causes.
88	6	"Welcome to Paradise Palms"	Georg Fenady	S : Jon Dalke & Ray Danton; T : David Moessinger	December 17, 1980	55307
Quincy's Native American foster son develops symptoms of the bubonic plague on his reservation, and Quincy fights to alert the public of the potential epidemic despite political and business roadblocks.
89	7	"By Their Faith"	Ron Satlof	Erich Collier	January 7, 1981	55313
Quincy and Sam are sent to San Ramos, Mexico (with an international medical team) to determine if a young girl's power to heal comes from the bones of a beloved saint found in a cave or a tragic exploitation by an overzealous tabloid reporter that cost the life of a young boy he befriended.
90	8	"Stain of Guilt"	Ray Danton	Sam Egan	January 14, 1981	55323
Quincy is advising on a movie based on a high-profile murder case, but, while examining the movie's murder scene, he determines the murder didn't occur in the same way both the trial and movie had presented, and that the real killer is still out there. Carolyn Jones and Ed Begley, Jr. guest star.
91	9	"Dear Mummy"	Georg Fenady	Michael Braverman	January 21, 1981	55322
In investigating an ancient mummy, Quincy uncovers an elaborate diamond smuggling operation from Cairo to Los Angeles spearheaded by a former Nazi soldier, who has kidnapped Danny to ensure Quincy's cooperation in recovering the mummy/gems. Ed Grover and John Karlen reprise their roles as Customs Agents Niven & Brice (from Season 5's "Diplomatic Immunity"); Martine Beswick guest stars as an Israeli agent.
92	10	"Headhunter"	Michael Vejar	Fred J. McKnight	February 4, 1981	55308
A stewardess (Lynn Herring) who was a mule for drugs is murdered, and Quincy attempts to determine who is responsible despite Internal Affairs' interference because they suspect a cop who used the dead girl as an informant may have crossed the line and gone dirty.
93	11	"Scream to the Skies"	Ron Satlof	Michael Braverman	February 11, 1981	55309
On Quincy's birthday, an airline crash into Santa Monica Bay results in many survivors who later died of hypothermia, and Quincy has to overcome his feelings of rage and depression over the deaths (especially a young girl) to take on the FAA to require life rafts aboard commercial airliners that fly over open waters.
94	12	"Jury Duty"	Georg Fenady	Preston Wood	February 18, 1981	55331
Quincy is called for jury duty, and proceeds to drive the presiding judge and counsel crazy with questions, but he also finds major flaws in the prosecution's case that may show an innocent man is being wrongly accused of murder.
95	13	"Who Speaks for the Children"	Georg Fenady	Michael Braverman	February 25, 1981	55320
Quincy's investigation of the death of nine-year-old Polly Carmody (found dead and tossed into a trash bin) leads the coroner into the dark world of child sex abuse, and the possibility that the victim of the mother's boyfriend (and a serial child molester) may be the perp — and the girl's sister may be his next target.
96	14	"Seldom Silent, Never Heard"	Jeffrey Hayden	Sam Egan, Maurice Klugman	March 4, 1981	55336
The tragic death of a teenager with Tourette's syndrome spurs Quincy into action in the issue of orphan drugs and ways to treat Tourette's and other so-called "orphan disease" patients.
97	15	"Of All Sad Words"	Bob Bender	Jeri Taylor	March 11, 1981	55324
Quincy becomes romantically involved with a woman who is under suspicion by her husband's life insurance company of killing him in a fire, and is suspected of killing two other men she was involved with.
98	16	"To Kill in Plain Sight"	Ray Austin	S : Chris Bunch & Allan Cole; T : Geoffrey Fischer	March 18, 1981	55328
Quincy rushes to determine who — a senator, a governor, or someone else — is the target of an assassination attempt when a man found dead in an explosion had evidence of a plot to kill a political figure. Fritz Weaver guest stars in a double role as a Senator and actor "Double"
99	17	"Sugar and Spice"	Georg Fenady	Jeri Taylor	April 1, 1981	55339
A model is found dead from dehydration after following the diet in a best-selling book, and Quincy has to prove the book caused her death when the author sues both Quincy and the Coroner's Office for defamation.
100	18	"Vigil of Fear"	Bob Bender	S : Steve Greenberg & Aubrey Solomon; S/T : Leo Garen	May 6, 1981	55330
A neighborhood watch group-turned-vigilante group has a shoot-out that results in the death of an innocent bystander, and Quincy has to determine who is responsible and try to stop the violence.
